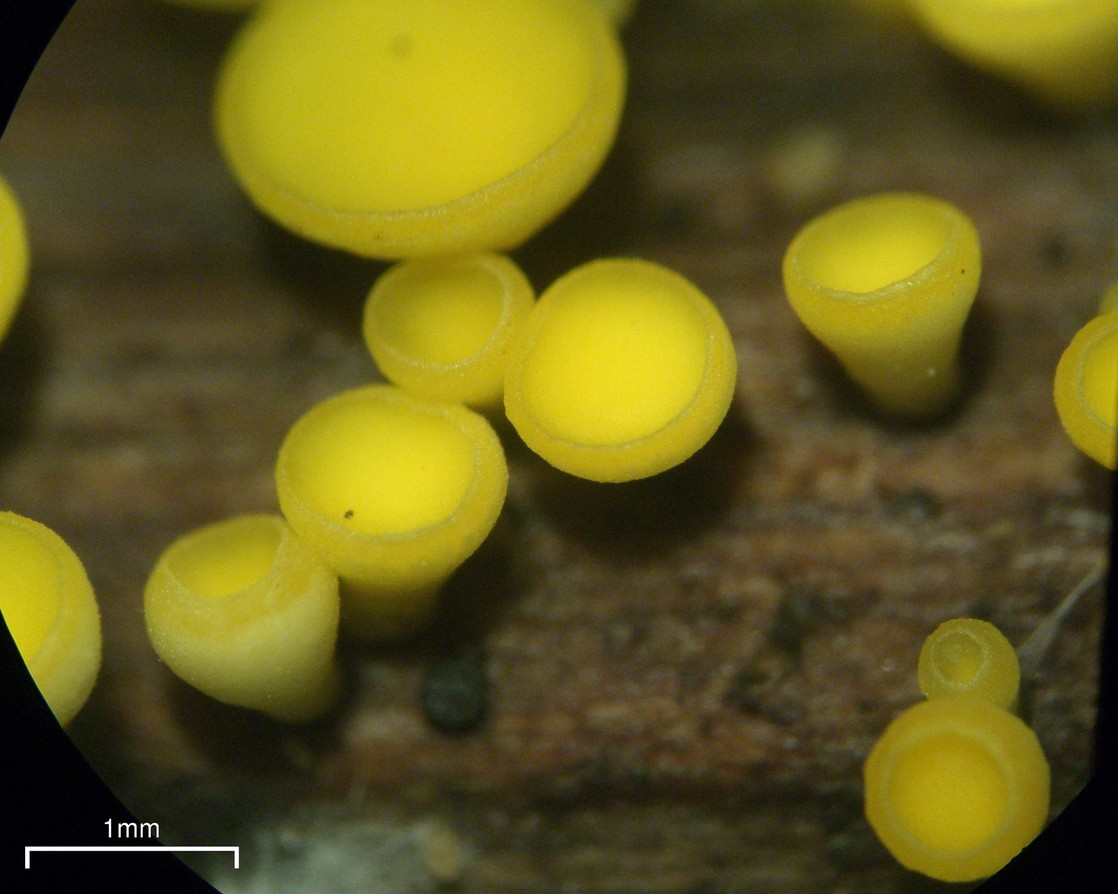

Scientific classification
- Kingdom: Fungi
- Division: Ascomycota
- Class: Leotiomycetes
- Order: Helotiales
- Family: Pezizellaceae
- Genus: Calycina
- Species: C. citrina

Binomial name
- Calycina citrina (Hedw.) Gray (1821)

Synonyms
- Octospora citrina Hedw. (1789); Peziza citrina Batsch (1789); Calycina citrina (Hedw.) Gray (1821); Helotium citrinum (Hedw.) Fr. (1849); Calycella citrina (Batsch) Boud. (1885); Bisporella citrina (Batsch) Korf & S.E.Carp. (1974)

= Calycina citrina =

Species of fungus

Calycina citrina, commonly known as yellow fairy cups or lemon discos, is a species of fungus in the family Pezizellaceae. The fungus produces tiny yellow cups up to 3 mm (1/8 in) in diameter, often without stalks, that fruit in groups or dense clusters on decaying deciduous wood that has lost its bark. The widely distributed species is found in North Africa, Asia, Europe, North America, and Central and South America. Found in late summer and autumn, the fungus is fairly common, but is easily overlooked owing to its small size. There are several similar species that can in most cases be distinguished by differences in color, morphology, or substrate. Microscopically, C. citrina can be distinguished from these lookalikes by its elliptical spores, which have a central partition, and an oil drop at each end.

== Taxonomy ==
The species was originally described from Europe in 1789 by German naturalist August Batsch as Peziza citrina. Elias Fries sanctioned this name in the second volume of his Systema Mycologicum (1821). Jean Louis Émile Boudier transferred the species to Calycella in 1885. Another historical name for the fungus was derived from Johann Hedwig's 1789 Octospora citrina. Fries referred Hedwig's name to Helotium in 1846, and for several decades the fungus was known as either Calycella citrina or Helotium citrinum, depending on which generic concept an author accepted. In a 1974 publication, Richard P. Korf noted that the generic name Helotium competes with a basidiomycete genus of the same name, and under the rules of botanical nomenclature, the ascomycete version of the name had to be abandoned because the basidiomycete version was sanctioned by Fries in 1832, and thus had priority. He also pointed out that the generic name Calycella could not be used, as it is a synonym of an older name Calycina, which contains species that bear only a distant taxonomic relationship to Helotium citrinum. Accordingly, he formally transferred Helotium citrinum to Bisporella, to produce the new combination Bisporella citrina. Korf further noted that since Bisporella was published by Pier Andrea Saccardo in 1884, it had priority over Boudier's 1885 Calycella which has since been treated as a synonym under Bisporella, but elsewhere Calycina is treated as distinct. Molecular studies in 2013 concluded Bisporella a synonym for Calycina and the species was renamed Calycina citrina.

The specific epithet citrina is derived from the Latin citrin, meaning "lemon yellow". Common names for the fungus include "yellow fairy cups", and the British Mycological Society-approved "lemon disco"; the name "disco" is short for Discomycetes, an older term for ascomycete species with disc- and cup-shaped fruit bodies. Samuel Frederick Gray called it the "lemon funnel-stool" in his 1821 work A Natural Arrangement of British Plants.

== Description ==
Fruit bodies begin as spherical, closed globules, before expanding. The smooth, bright yellow fruit bodies are small—typically less than 3 mm (1/8 in) in diameter and up to 1 mm (1/32 in) high—and shallowly cup- or disc-shaped. The inner surface is smooth, and bright yellow, while the outer surface is a paler yellow. In mass, the spore color is white. The stalk is broad, pale yellow in color, and short to nearly absent; when present it is rarely more than 1 mm. The fruit bodies may be so numerous that their shapes are distorted by overcrowding. Fruit bodies that have dried are wrinkled and have a dull orangish-brown color. The fruit bodies have no distinctive taste nor odor, and are not edible.

The smooth spores are roughly elliptical, measuring 8–14 by 3–5 μm; in maturity they have one cross-wall, and oil drops at either end. The asci (spore-bearing cells) measure 100–135 by 7–10 μm. The paraphyses are shaped liked narrow cylinders with diameters up to 1.5 μm, and have tips that are rounded or somewhat club-shaped. β-Carotene is the predominant pigment responsible for the yellow color of the fruit body.

=== Similar species ===
There are several small yellow discomycetes with which C. citrina might be confused. Lookalikes include the acorn cup (Hymenoscyphus fructigenus) that grows on fallen acorns and hickory nuts. The green stain fungus (Chlorociboria aeruginascens) forms blue-green cups, and stains its wood substrate bluish-green. Lachnellula arida is up to 6 mm (1/4 in) in diameter, and has hairs around the edge of its cup, and its outer surface is covered with short brown hairs. Fruit bodies of Bisporella sulfurina have a coloration similar to C. citrina, but they are smaller and grow in clusters on old, blackened, fungal stroma on wood. Phaeohelotium species appear similar, and Orbilia species produce smaller discs. Pithya and Chloroscypha grow on conifer foliage. Arachnopeziza cups have a fuzzy surface.

Other lookalikes include Hymenoscyphus species, including H. calyculus, but these can be distinguished by their distinct stalks, and growth on smaller woody debris like sticks and twigs, rather than logs and stumps. Many other small, yellow discos have fringed or hairy margins to the discs, like Anthracobia melaloma; this latter species grows on or near moss, rather than wood. Chlorosplenium chlora is another small cup fungus resembling C. citrina. It has a bright yellow outer surface, but the hymenium becomes develops greenish tints in age. The common jellyspot fungus (Dacrymyces stillatus) is usually smaller but can approach the dimensions of C. citrina. Similar in color, its fruit bodies are usually blob-like rather than cup shaped. Another cup fungus that grows on dead beech wood is Neobulgaria pura, but its fruit bodies are larger, ranging from 2–4 cm (3/4–1 5/8 in).

Also similar are Bisporella pallescens, Dacrymyces capitatus, Guepiniopsis alpina, and members of Octospora.

Lookalikes
Hymenoscyphus calyculus	Dacrymyces stillatus	Lachnellula arida

== Distribution ==
Calycina citrina is saprobic, and so obtains nutrients by breaking down complex organic molecules into simpler ones. Fruit bodies are typically encountered growing in dense clusters on the surface of rotten wood (especially deciduous trees), particularly beech. They have also been found growing on the fruit bodies of the polypore fungus Daedaleopsis confragosa. In a study of the succession of fungi associated with the decay of a 120-year-old healthy beech tree uprooted by strong winds, C. citrina was found on the wood about three years after the fall. It appeared after early colonizers such as Quaternaria quaternata, Tubercularia vulgaris (the anamorph form of Nectria cinnabarina), and Bulgaria inquinans, and was followed by Stereum hirsutum and Nectria cinnabarina.

== Ecology ==
The widespread fungus is known from North Africa, Asia, Europe, North America, Central and South America, Australia, and New Zealand. It is one of the most common of the small discomycetes.
