= Crumenulopsis sororia =

Scientific classification
- Kingdom: Fungi
- Division: Ascomycota
- Class: Leotiomycetes
- Order: Helotiales
- Family: Helotiaceae
- Genus: Crumenulopsis
- Species: C. sororia

Binomial name
- Crumenulopsis sororia (P. Karst) J.W. Groves
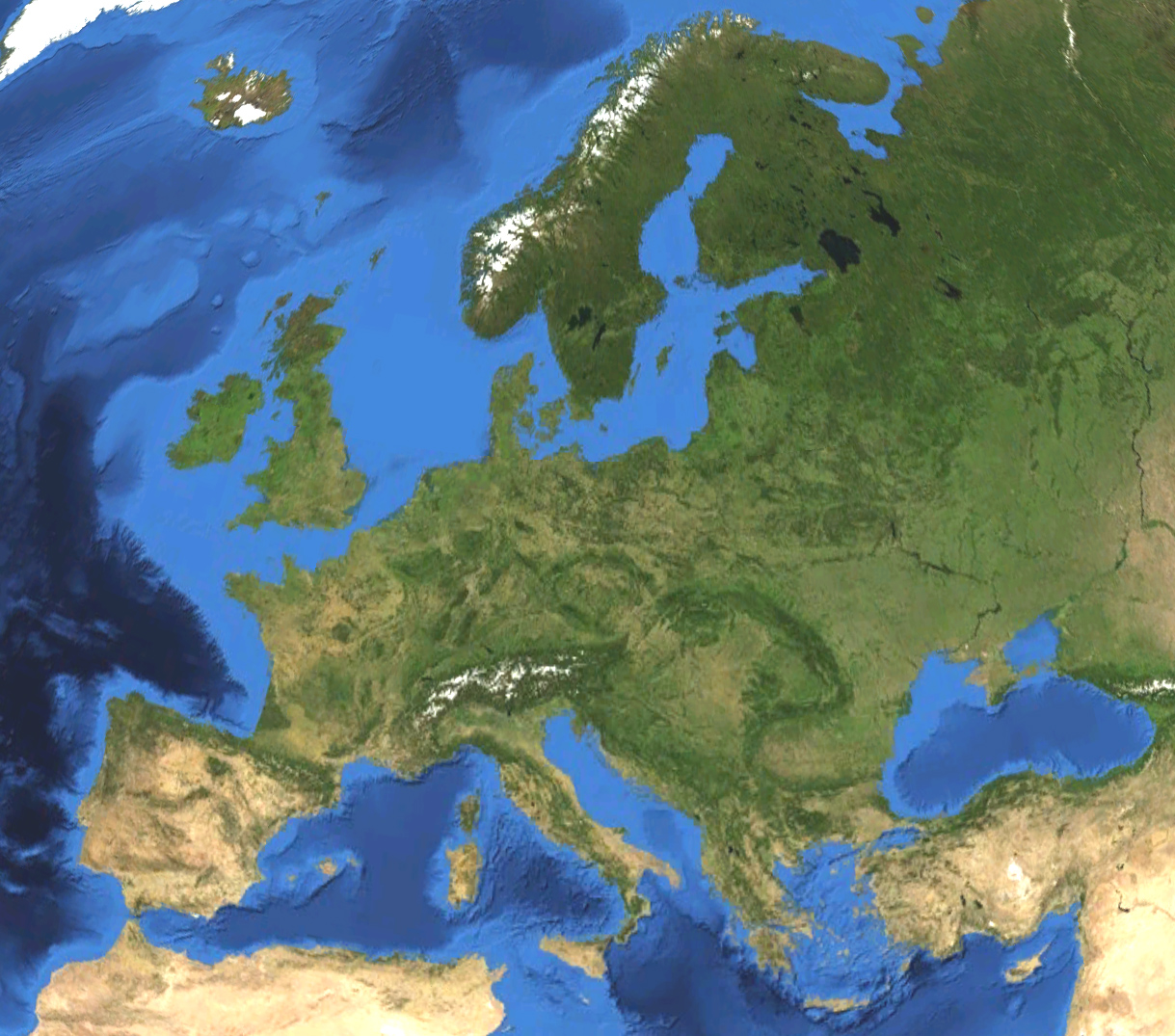

Synonyms
- Crumenula sororia P. Karst 1871; Digitosporium piniphilum Gremmen 1953

Fungus in the Ascomycota

Crumenulopsis sororia is an ascomycete or cup fungus which can cause cankers on the bark of various species of Pinus, including Pinus contorta, Pinus nigra, Pinus sylvestris and Pinus cembra.
