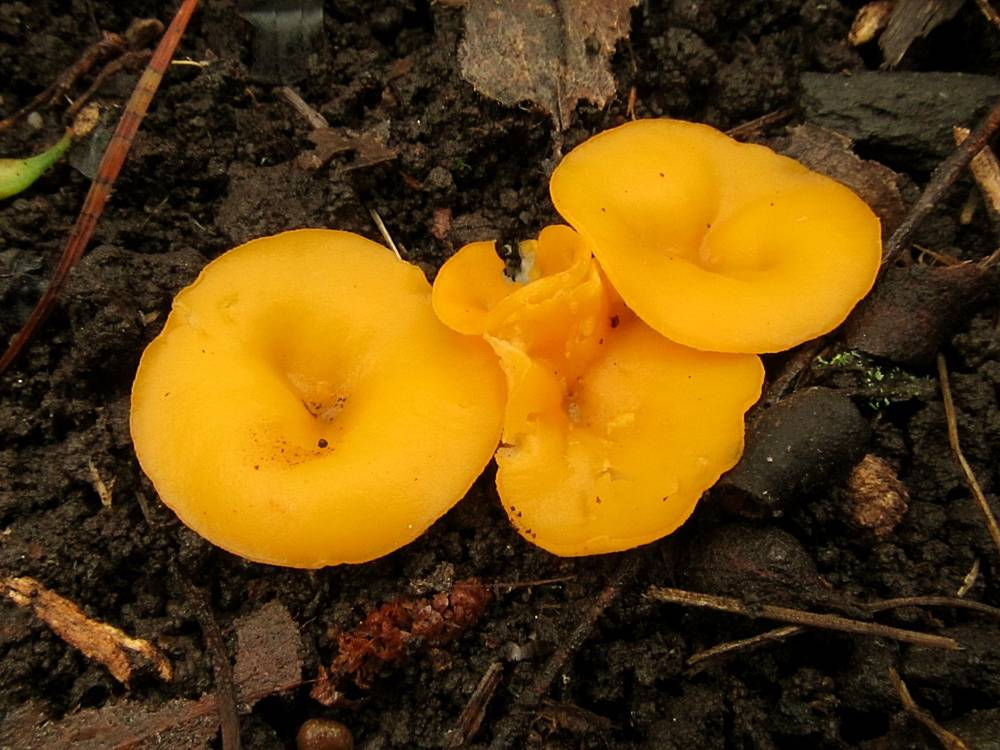
- In Macedon Ranges, Victoria, Australia

Scientific classification
- Domain: Eukaryota
- Kingdom: Fungi
- Division: Ascomycota
- Class: Leotiomycetes
- Order: Helotiales
- Family: Helotiaceae
- Genus: Discinella
- Species: D. terrestris

Binomial name
- Discinella terrestris (Berk. & Broome) Dennis (1958)

Synonyms
- Helotium terrestre Berk. & Broome (1882); Dasyscyphus terrestris (Berk. & Broome) Sacc. (1889)

= Discinella terrestris =

Species of fungus

Discinella terrestris is a species of fungus in the family Helotiaceae. It was first described as Helotium terrestre by Miles Joseph Berkeley and Christopher Edmund Broome in 1882, from collections made in Brisbane. R.W.G. Dennis transferred it to the genus Discinella in 1958.

Fruit bodies are orange to yellowish-orange discs up to 10 mm (0.4 in) in diameter. The cylindrical eight-spored asci are borne on long stalks, and measure 200–225 by 10–14 μm; spores are elliptical to spindle-shaped, contains two to four oil droplets, and measure 14–25 by 7.5–9 μm. Paraphyses are shaped like narrow cylinders about 2 μm thick, and have rounded tips. The species is found in Australia, where it grows on the floor of sclerophyllous eucalypt forests.
