= Dominique Alexandre Godron =

French botanist (1807–1880)

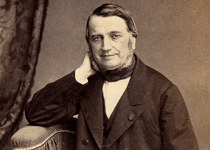
Dominique Alexandre Godron

Dominique Alexandre Godron (French pronunciation: [dɔminik alɛksɑ̃dʁ ɡɔdʁɔ̃]; 25 March 1807 - 16 August 1880) was a French medical doctor, botanist, geologist and speleologist born in the town of Hayange, in the département Moselle.

Godron studied medicine at the University of Strasbourg, and during his career distinguished himself in natural sciences as well as in the field of medicine. In 1854 he became dean and professor of natural history to the Faculty of Sciences at Nancy. Here he established a natural history museum and reorganized its botanical garden (now the Jardin Dominique Alexandre Godron, renamed in his honor).

Among his numerous writings were a publication on the flora of the Lorraine region of France called "Flore de Lorraine" (1843), and the three-volume "Flore de France", a work on flora native to France and Corsica that was co-written with botanist Jean Charles Marie Grenier (1808-1875). In addition to his botanical works, he published a number of studies in the field of ethnology. Godron issued at least two exsiccata-like series distributing duplicate plant specimens, namely Herbier normal de la flora de Lorraine and Plantae Galliae australis.

Before Mendel, he discovered the main features of hybridation. In "de l'Espece et des races dans les êtres organises" he also demonstrated that hybridization in the vegetal world was, against the dominant thinking at the time, similar to hybridization in the animal world. He finally demonstrated the unity of mankind in his book dedicated to our species.

In 1846, he was honoured by botanists Jean Baptiste Mougeot and Joseph Henri Léveillé who named Godronia, which is a genus of fungi in the family Helotiaceae. Then in 1927, William Webster Diehl and Edith Katherine Cash published Godroniopsis, which is also a genus of fungi in the family Helotiaceae.
