= Pseudopezicula tracheiphila =

Scientific classification
- Kingdom: Fungi
- Division: Ascomycota
- Class: Leotiomycetes
- Order: Helotiales
- Family: Helotiaceae
- Genus: Pseudopezicula
- Species: P. tracheiphila

Binomial name
- Pseudopezicula tracheiphila (Müll.-Thurg.) Korf & W.Y.Zhuang (1986)

Synonyms
- Pseudopeziza tracheiphila Müll.-Thurg. (1903)

Species of fungus

Pseudopezicula tracheiphila is a species of fungus in the family Helotiaceae that is found in Europe. It is a plant pathogen that affects grapes.
