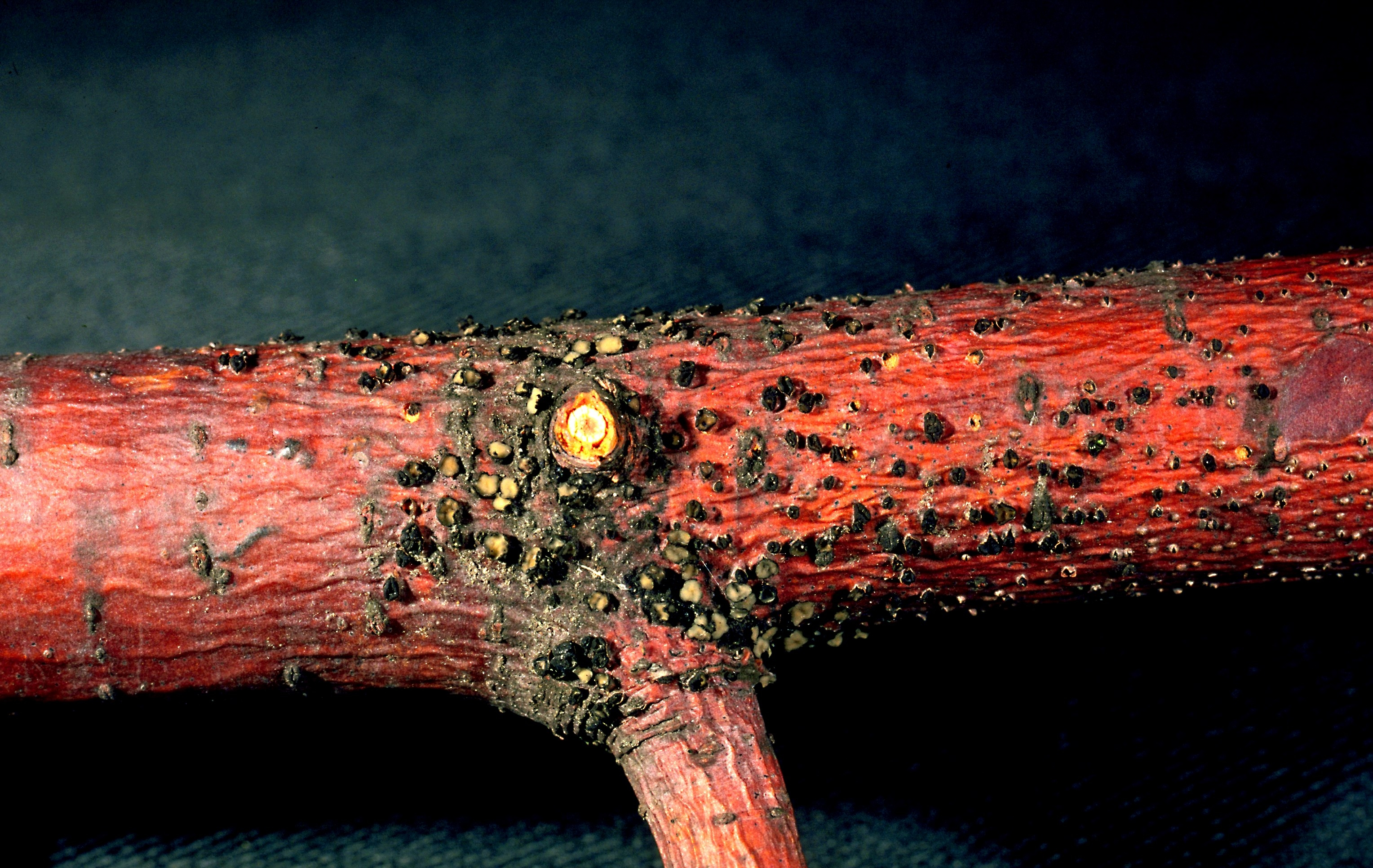

Scientific classification
- Kingdom: Fungi
- Division: Ascomycota
- Class: Leotiomycetes
- Order: Helotiales
- Family: Helotiaceae
- Genus: Cenangium
- Species: C. ferruginosum

Binomial name
- Cenangium ferruginosum Fr. (1818)

Synonyms
- Cenangium abietis (Pers.) Duby 1896

= Cenangium ferruginosum =

Species of fungus

Cenangium ferruginosum is a species of fungus which infects young twigs of especially older pines (Pinus sylvestris). It, along with Cenangium atropurpureum, causes the disease Cenangium canker. The parasite lives under the bark of the trunk and spreads out further i.e. bark of branches up to the fresh twig tips of needles. The needles turn brown at the base, and the needles on the twig tips die off in time.
