= Pseudopezicula tetraspora =

Scientific classification
- Kingdom: Fungi
- Division: Ascomycota
- Class: Leotiomycetes
- Order: Helotiales
- Family: Helotiaceae
- Genus: Pseudopezicula
- Species: P. tetraspora

Binomial name
- Pseudopezicula tetraspora Korf, R.C. Pearson & W.Y. Zhuang (1986)

Species of fungus

Pseudopezicula tetraspora is a species of fungus in the family Helotiaceae. Found in North America, it is a plant pathogen that infects grape, causing a disease known as "angular leaf scorch".

== Hosts and symptoms ==
The hosts of P. tetraspora include some plants of the family Vitaceae. Angular leaf scorch of grapevines has been observed on 18 species of grapevines Vitis, on interspecific hybrids of Vitis, and on Virginia creeper Parthenocissus quiniquefolia. An early symptom of angular leaf scorch of grapevines is the presence of faint chlorotic lesions near major veins on the leaf surface. As the disease progresses, the lesions spread, changing from yellow to reddish brown. Reddening/browning of major leaf veins accompanies the lesions. The reddish brown tissue turns necrotic and retains a yellow margin, which separates the necrotic tissue from the healthy tissue. In red or black Vitis cultivars, the margin is read, not yellow and on occasion, the yellow margin is not present. The reddish brown lesions with yellow margins can be seen in early June or three to four weeks after infection begins. As the lesions become larger late in the growing season, necrosis can cause premature defoliation, thus inhibiting photosynthesis of the plant host. Flower clusters can also dry prematurely, which decreases the plant's ability to produce fruit.

== Disease cycle ==
Pseudopezicula tetraspora fungi overwinter in leaf litter on the soil surface. If there is sufficient moisture in the spring, fruiting bodies (apothecia) form and produce asci. The asci produce four ascospores each by sexual reproduction. Ascospores are forcibly released from the asci at the end of a rain event following a dry period and are splashed by water or carried by wind to host leaves and flower stems. When the ascospores reach the host plant, the infection cycle begins. There is usually one cycle per growing season which takes place during the spring, but if moist conditions continue throughout the growing season, apothecia can form on dead tissue of infected leaves that are still attached to the plant host. Asci with ascospores are produced from the apothecia and the ascospores re-infect the same host or other susceptible hosts.

== Management ==
Cultural practices and fungicide use are two methods that grape growers use to reduce P. tetraspora. Removing leaf litter, increasing air circulation over the soil surface and canopy space, and removal of susceptible hosts from the immediate environment are some cultural practices that can help control P. tetraspora development. Because P. tetraspora survives on leaf litter, the removal of the litter before bud break can remove residual P. tetraspora. Apothecia of P. tetraspora require moisture to germinate and ascospores require moisture for dispersal, so increasing air circulation to the soil surface will detour P. tetraspora from getting to the host. Removal of other susceptible hosts of the family Vitaceae, like Parthenocissus quiniquefolia can reduce the likelihood of foreign P. tetraspora inoculum to enter where one doesn't want disease. Foliar fungicide sprays are recommended to control P. tetraspora because the ascospore lands on, infects, and penetrates the leaf. Products containing the fungicide mancozeb are generally used as a foliar spray for P. tetraspora control. Mancozeb disturbs the ascospores when they land on the plant tissue treated with the product.
