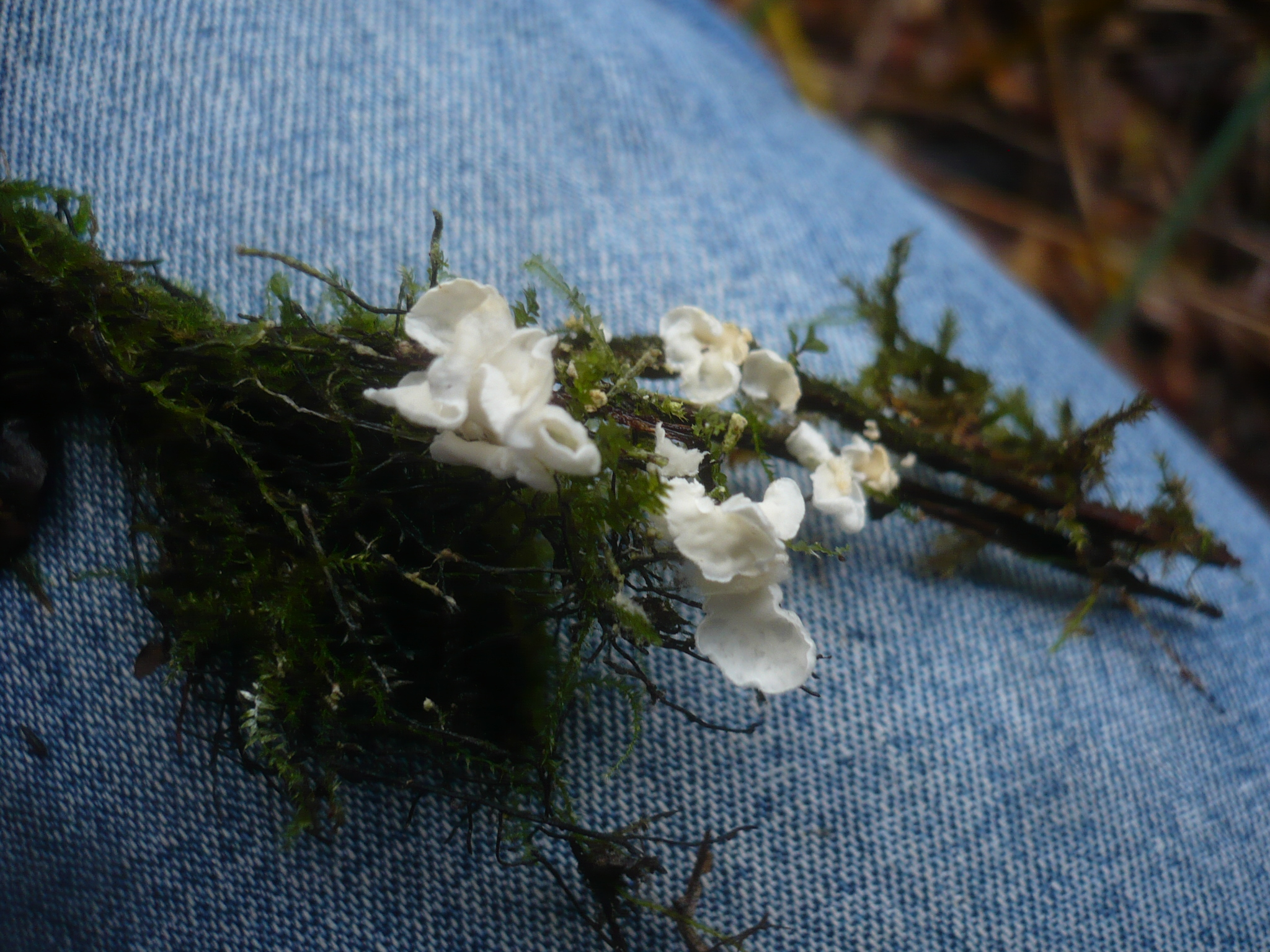
- Cellypha goldbachii

Scientific classification
- Kingdom: Fungi
- Division: Basidiomycota
- Class: Agaricomycetes
- Order: Agaricales
- Family: Tricholomataceae
- Genus: Cellypha; Donk (1959)

Type species
- Cellypha goldbachii (Weinm.) Donk (1959)

Species
- C. algieriensis C. arenosa C. berkeleyi C. clavata C. cycadis C. goldbachii C. musicola C. panamensis C. reticulata C. rhoina C. stictoidea C. subgelatinosa

= Cellypha =

Genus of fungi

Cellypha is a genus of fungi in the family Tricholomataceae. The widespread genus contains 10 species.
