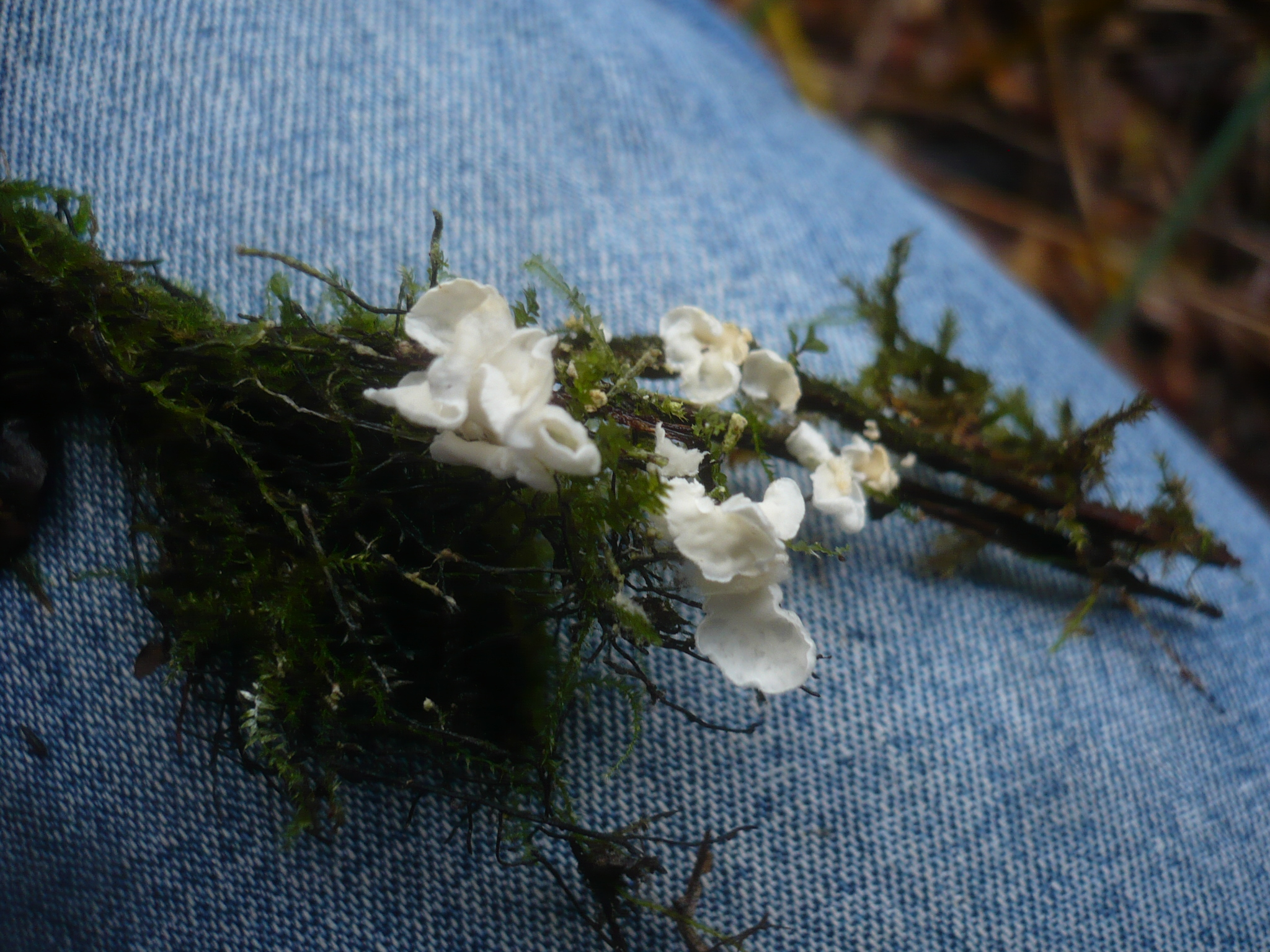

Scientific classification
- Kingdom: Fungi
- Division: Basidiomycota
- Class: Agaricomycetes
- Order: Agaricales
- Family: Tricholomataceae
- Genus: Cellypha
- Species: C. goldbachii

Binomial name
- Cellypha goldbachii (Weinm.) Donk (1959)

Synonyms
- Chaetocypha variabilis Corda (1829); Cyphella goldbachii Weinm. (1836); Cyphella caricina Peck (1880); Calyptella goldbachii (Weinm.) Quél. (1886)

= Cellypha goldbachii =

Species of fungus

Cellypha goldbachii is a species of fungus in the family Tricholomataceae, and the type species of the genus Cellypha.
