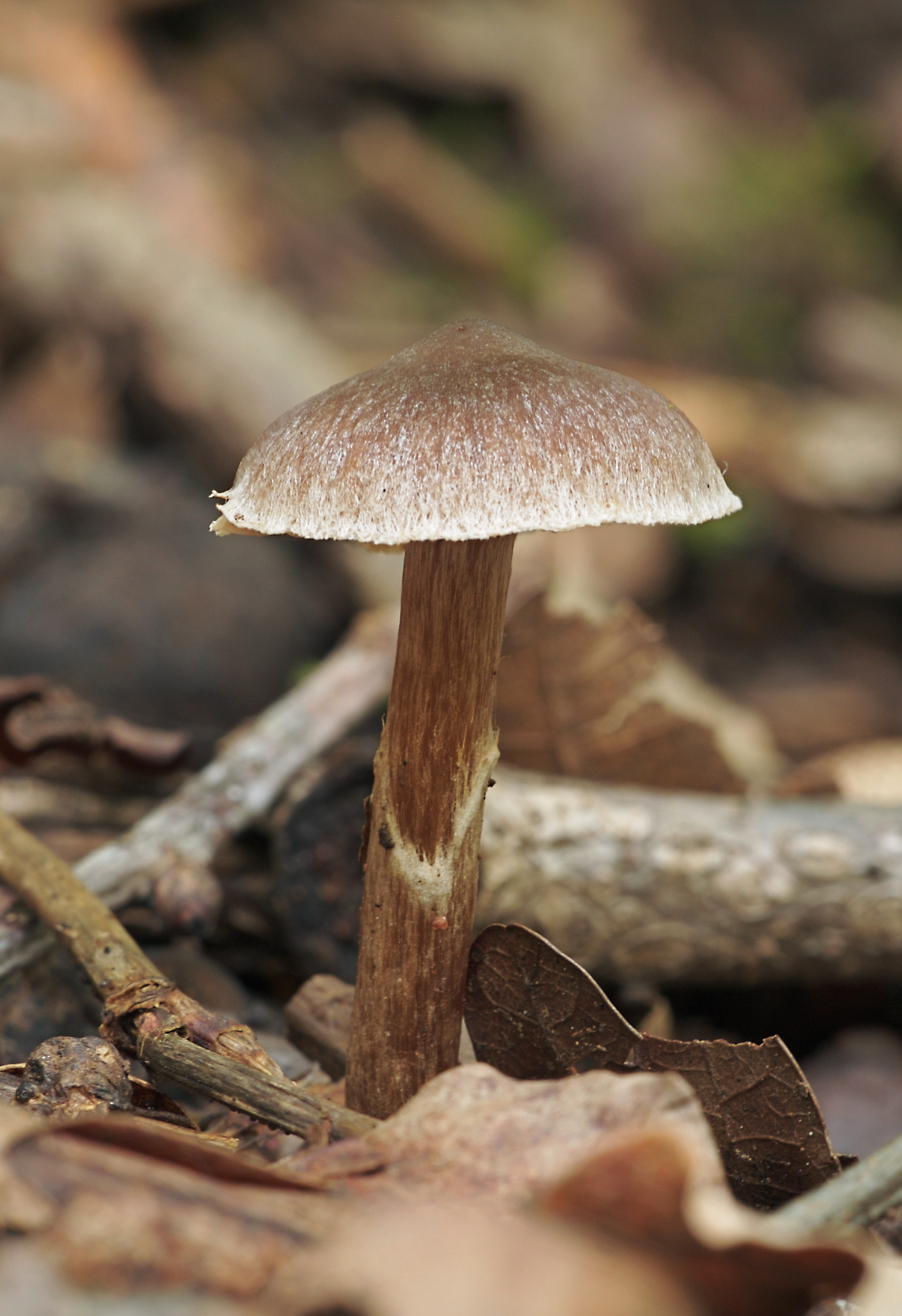

Scientific classification
- Domain: Eukaryota
- Kingdom: Fungi
- Division: Basidiomycota
- Class: Agaricomycetes
- Order: Agaricales
- Family: Cortinariaceae
- Genus: Cortinarius
- Species: C. flexipes

Binomial name
- Cortinarius flexipes (Pers.) Fr. (1838)

Synonyms
- Agaricus flexipes Pers. (1801)

= Cortinarius flexipes =

Species of fungus

Cortinarius flexipes Mycological characteristics
- Gills on hymenium
- Cap is umbonate
- Hymenium is adnate
- Stipe has a cortina
- Spore print is reddish-brown
- Ecology is mycorrhizal
- Edibility is inedible

Cortinarius flexipes is a fungus, specifically a mushroom, a small brown species in the genus Cortinarius. It is commonly known as the Pelargonium webcap because of its unusual smell of Pelargonium (the household "geranium").

This species of mushroom is found in Europe and North America. It is hygrophanous, and belongs to the Telamonia group, being thin-fleshed and having a dry cap and stipe.

== Synonymy ==
Cortinarius paleaceus (Weinm.) Fr. and Cortinarius paleiferus Svrek (sometimes written C. paleifer) have commonly been identified in Europe as separate species. C. paleiferus is defined as having more widely spaced gills, and has a pale violet mycelium at the base of the stipe. Now these types are combined into one species and considered to be only varieties of C. flexipes.

== Description ==
Cortinarius flexipes cap is up to 3 centimetres (1.2 in). It is dark brown but becoming pale fawn on drying, with white hair-like scales especially near the edge. It is more or less pointed in the centre. The stipe is up to about 7 centimetres (2.8 in) and fibrous, with white bands of veil remnants. Fruitbodies have the smell of Pelargonium (household geranium). The species is inedible.

== See also ==
- List of Cortinarius species
