= Calycina =

Calycina is a scientific name for several organisms and may refer to:

- Calycina (beetle), a genus of insects in the family Mordellidae
- Calycina (fungus), a genus of fungi in the family Pezizellaceae
- Calycina (echinoderm), a superorder of sea urchins
