= Dictyonia =

Scientific classification
- Kingdom: Fungi
- Division: Ascomycota
- Class: Leotiomycetes
- Order: Helotiales
- Family: Helotiaceae
- Genus: Dictyonia; Syd.

Type species
- Dictyonia pouroumae Henn.

Genus of fungi

Dictyonia is a genus of fungi in the family Helotiaceae. The genus contains 2 species.
