= Parorbiliopsis =

Scientific classification
- Kingdom: Fungi
- Division: Ascomycota
- Class: Leotiomycetes
- Order: Helotiales
- Family: Helotiaceae
- Genus: Parorbiliopsis; Spooner & Dennis

Type species
- Parorbiliopsis minuta Spooner & Dennis

Genus of fungi

Parorbiliopsis is a genus of fungi in the family Helotiaceae. The genus contains about 5 species.
