= Gorgoniceps =

Scientific classification
- Kingdom: Fungi
- Division: Ascomycota
- Class: Leotiomycetes
- Order: Helotiales
- Family: Helotiaceae
- Genus: Gorgoniceps; P. Karst.

Type species
- Gorgoniceps aridula (P. Karst.) P. Karst.

Genus of fungi

Gorgoniceps is a genus of fungi in the family Helotiaceae. The genus contains 6 species.

Species:

- Gorgoniceps aridula
- Gorgoniceps hylocomnii
