= Godroniopsis =

Scientific classification
- Kingdom: Fungi
- Division: Ascomycota
- Class: Leotiomycetes
- Order: Helotiales
- Family: Helotiaceae
- Genus: Godroniopsis; Diehl & E.K. Cash

Type species
- Godroniopsis quernea (Schwein.) Diehl & E.K. Cash

Genus of fungi

Godroniopsis is a genus of fungi in the family Helotiaceae. The genus contains two species.

The genus name of Godroniopsis is in honour of Dominique Alexandre Godron (1807–1880), who was a French physician, botanist, geologist and speleologist.

The genus was circumscribed by William Webster Diehl and Edith Katherine Cash in Mycologia Vol.21 on page 243 in 1929.
