= Velutarina =

Scientific classification
- Kingdom: Fungi
- Division: Ascomycota
- Class: Leotiomycetes
- Order: Helotiales
- Family: Helotiaceae
- Genus: Velutarina; Korf ex Korf

Type species
- Velutarina rufo-olivacea (Alb. & Schwein.) Korf

Species
- V. juniperi V. rufo-olivacea

Genus of fungi

Velutarina is a genus of fungi in the family Helotiaceae.
