= Endoscypha =

Scientific classification
- Kingdom: Fungi
- Division: Ascomycota
- Class: Leotiomycetes
- Order: Helotiales
- Family: Helotiaceae
- Genus: Endoscypha; Syd. (1924)
- Species: E. perforans

Binomial name
- Endoscypha perforans Syd. (1924)

Single-species fungal genus

Endoscypha is a fungal genus in the family Helotiaceae. This is a monotypic genus, containing the single species Endoscypha perforans. The genus and species were described as new to science in 1924 by German mycologist Hans Sydow.
