= Cenangiumella =

Scientific classification
- Kingdom: Fungi
- Division: Ascomycota
- Class: Leotiomycetes
- Order: Helotiales
- Family: Helotiaceae
- Genus: Cenangiumella; J. Fröhl. & K.D. Hyde

Type species
- Cenangiumella rattanicola J. Fröhl. & K.D. Hyde

Genus of fungi

Cenangiumella is a genus of fungi in the family Helotiaceae. This is a monotypic genus, containing the single species Cenangiumella rattanicola.
