= Ascocalyx =

Scientific classification
- Kingdom: Fungi
- Division: Ascomycota
- Class: Leotiomycetes
- Order: Helotiales
- Family: Helotiaceae
- Genus: Ascocalyx; Naumov

Type species
- Ascocalyx abietis Naumov

Genus of fungi

Ascocalyx is a genus of fungi in the family Helotiaceae. The genus contains 6 species.
