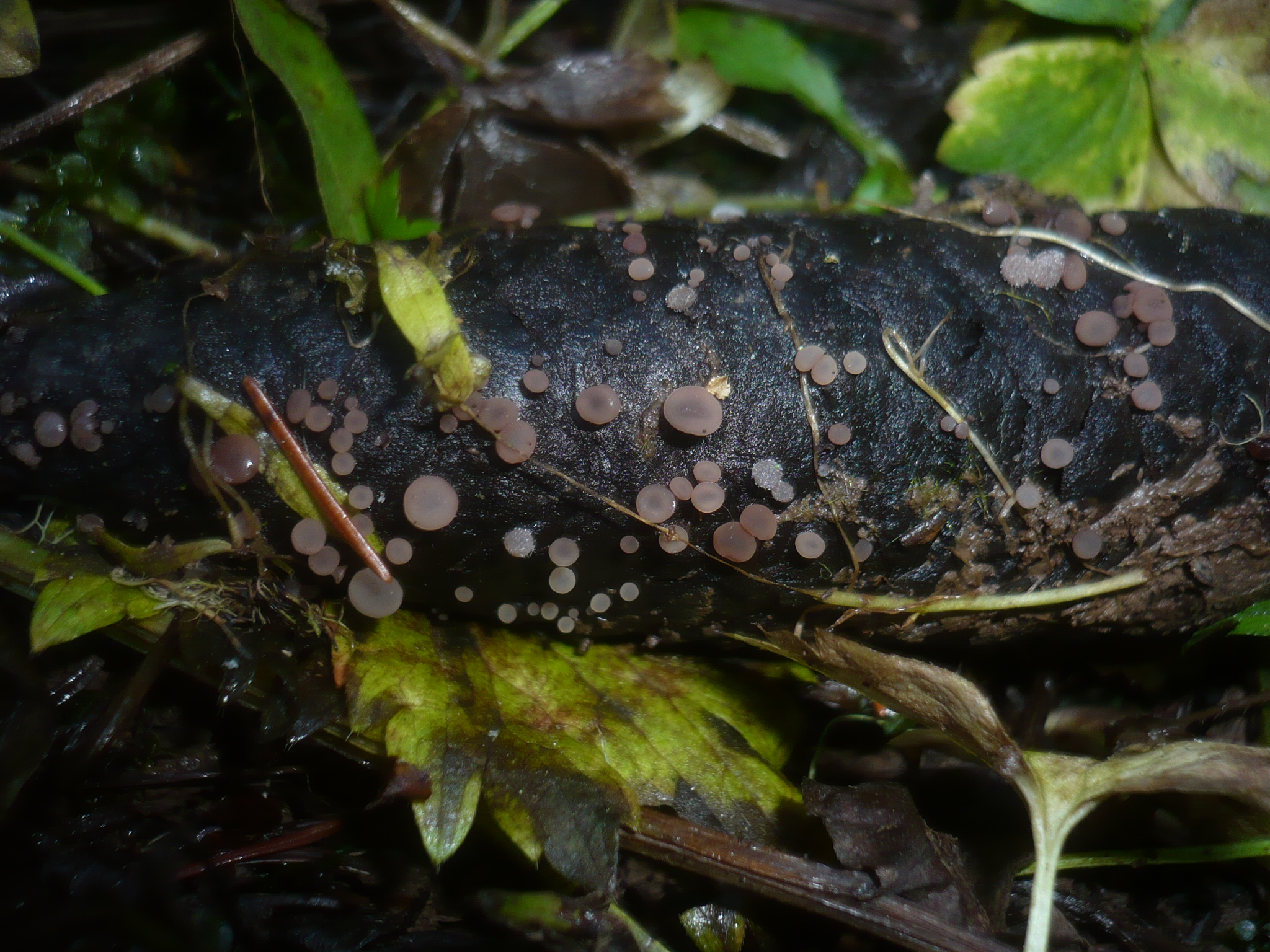
- Ombrophila ianthina

Scientific classification
- Kingdom: Fungi
- Division: Ascomycota
- Class: Leotiomycetes
- Order: Helotiales
- Family: Helotiaceae
- Genus: Ombrophila; Fr. (1849)

Type species
- Ombrophila violacea (Hedw.) Fr. (1849)

Synonyms
- Haplocybe Clem. (1909); Kubickia Svrcek (1957)

= Ombrophila =

Genus of fungi

Ombrophila is a genus of fungi in the family Helotiaceae. The genus contains 11 species. Elias Fries circumscribed Ombrophila in 1849.

== Species ==
- Ombrophila ambigua
- Ombrophila baeumleri
- Ombrophila decolorans
- Ombrophila helotioides
- Ombrophila ianthina
- Ombrophila microspora
- Ombrophila nigripes
- Ombrophila obstricta
- Ombrophila purpurea
- Ombrophila rudis
- Ombrophila violacea
