= Bulgariella =

Scientific classification
- Kingdom: Fungi
- Division: Ascomycota
- Class: Leotiomycetes
- Order: Helotiales
- Family: Helotiaceae
- Genus: Bulgariella; P. Karst.

Type species
- Bulgariella pulla (Fr.) P. Karst.

Genus of fungi

Bulgariella is a genus of fungi in the family Helotiaceae. The genus contains 4 species.
