= Crumenella =

Scientific classification
- Kingdom: Fungi
- Division: Ascomycota
- Class: Leotiomycetes
- Order: Helotiales
- Family: Helotiaceae
- Genus: Crumenella; P. Karst

Genus of fungi

Crumenella is a genus of fungi in the family Helotiaceae.
