= Heterosphaeria =

Scientific classification
- Kingdom: Fungi
- Division: Ascomycota
- Class: Leotiomycetes
- Order: Helotiales
- Family: Helotiaceae
- Genus: Heterosphaeria; Grev.

Type species
- Heterosphaeria patella (Tode) Grev.

Genus of fungi

Heterosphaeria is a genus of fungi in the family Helotiaceae. The genus contains 6 species.
