= Micropodia =

Scientific classification
- Kingdom: Fungi
- Division: Ascomycota
- Class: Leotiomycetes
- Order: Helotiales
- Family: Helotiaceae
- Genus: Micropodia; Boud.

Type species
- Micropodia pteridina (Nyl.) Boud.

Genus of fungi

Micropodia is a genus of fungi in the family Helotiaceae; according to the 2007 Outline of Ascomycota, the placement in this family is uncertain. The genus contains 1 or 2 species.
