= Phaeangellina =

Scientific classification
- Kingdom: Fungi
- Division: Ascomycota
- Class: Leotiomycetes
- Order: Helotiales
- Family: Helotiaceae
- Genus: Phaeangellina; Dennis

Type species
- Phaeangellina empetri (W. Phillips) Dennis

Genus of fungi

Phaeangellina is a genus of fungi in the family Helotiaceae. This is a monotypic genus, containing the single species Phaeangellina empetri.
