= Neocudoniella =

Scientific classification
- Kingdom: Fungi
- Division: Ascomycota
- Class: Leotiomycetes
- Order: Helotiales
- Family: Helotiaceae
- Genus: Neocudoniella; S. Imai

Type species
- Neocudoniella jezoënsis (S. Imai) S. Imai

Genus of fungi

Neocudoniella is a genus of fungi in the family Helotiaceae. The genus contains 2 species.
