= Metapezizella =

Scientific classification
- Kingdom: Fungi
- Division: Ascomycota
- Class: Leotiomycetes
- Order: Helotiales
- Family: Helotiaceae
- Genus: Metapezizella; Petr.

Type species
- Metapezizella phyllachorivora Petr.

Genus of fungi

Metapezizella is a genus of fungi in the family Helotiaceae. This is a monotypic genus, containing the single species Metapezizella phyllachorivora.
