= Poculopsis =

Scientific classification
- Kingdom: Fungi
- Division: Ascomycota
- Class: Leotiomycetes
- Order: Helotiales
- Family: Helotiaceae
- Genus: Poculopsis; Kirschst.

Type species
- Poculopsis ogrensis Kirschst.

Genus of fungi

Poculopsis is a genus of fungi in the family Helotiaceae. This is a monotypic genus, containing the single species Poculopsis ogrensis.
