= Dencoeliopsis =

Scientific classification
- Kingdom: Fungi
- Division: Ascomycota
- Class: Leotiomycetes
- Order: Helotiales
- Family: Helotiaceae
- Genus: Dencoeliopsis; Korf

Type species
- Dencoeliopsis johnstonii (Berk.) Korf

Genus of fungi

Dencoeliopsis is a genus of fungi in the family Helotiaceae. The genus contains 2 species.
