= Pseudopezicula =

Scientific classification
- Kingdom: Fungi
- Division: Ascomycota
- Class: Leotiomycetes
- Order: Helotiales
- Family: Helotiaceae
- Genus: Pseudopezicula; Korf (1986)

Type species
- Pseudopezicula tetraspora Korf, R.C.Pearson & W.Y.Zhuang (1986)

Species
- Pseudopezicula tetraspora Pseudopezicula tracheiphila

Genus of fungi

Pseudopezicula is a genus of fungi in the family Helotiaceae. Circumscribed by mycologist Richard P. Korf in 1986, the genus contains two species that cause angular leaf scorch disease on grapes.
