= Mollisinopsis =

Scientific classification
- Kingdom: Fungi
- Division: Ascomycota
- Class: Leotiomycetes
- Order: Helotiales
- Family: Helotiaceae
- Genus: Mollisinopsis; Arendh. & R. Sharma

Type species
- Mollisinopsis filicis Arendh. & R. Sharma

Genus of fungi

Mollisinopsis is a genus of fungi in the family Helotiaceae. The genus contains 3 species.
