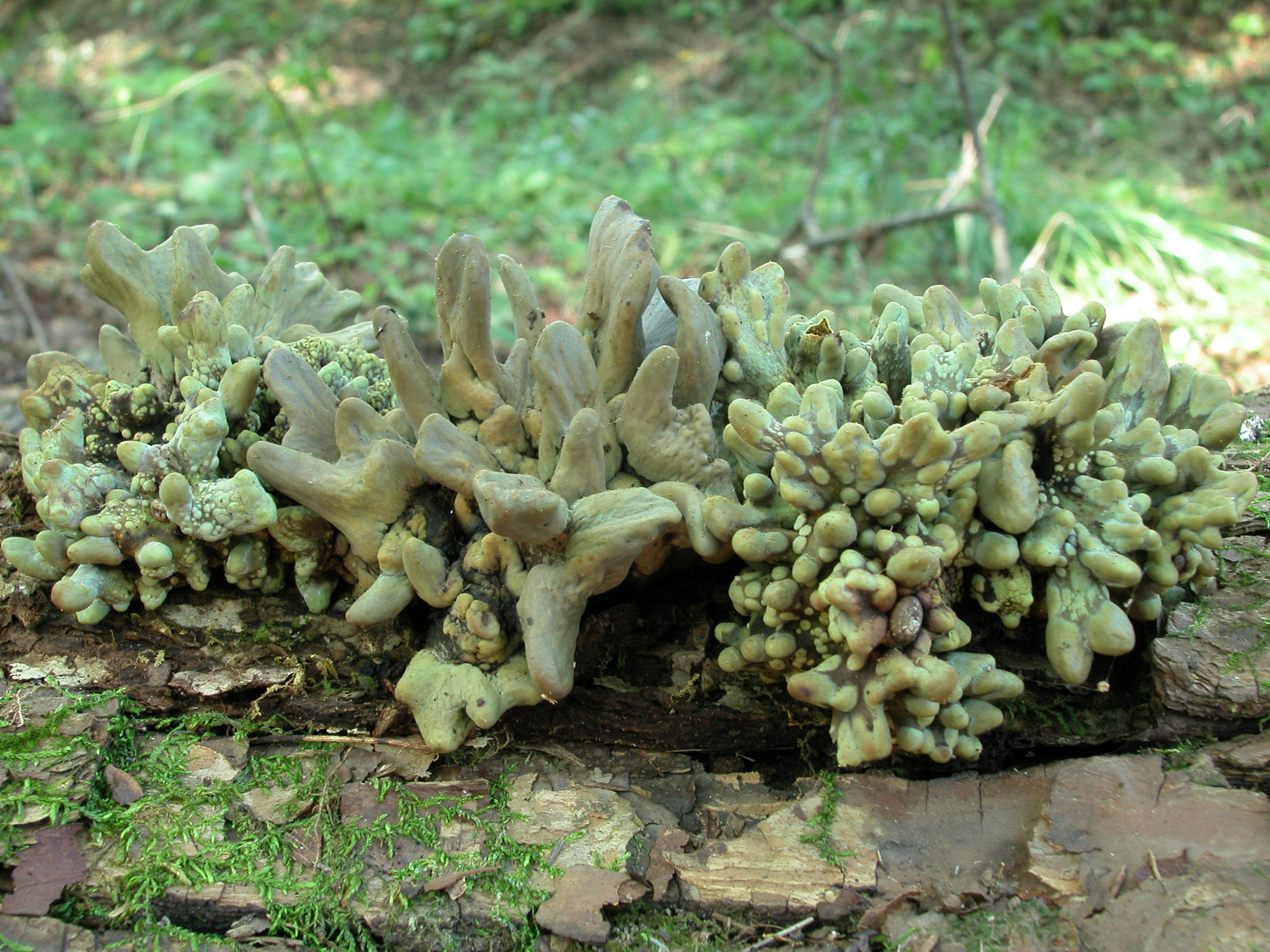

Scientific classification
- Kingdom: Fungi
- Division: Ascomycota
- Class: Leotiomycetes
- Order: Helotiales
- Family: Helotiaceae
- Genus: Ascoclavulina; Otani
- Species: A. sakaii

Binomial name
- Ascoclavulina sakaii Y. Otani

= Ascoclavulina =

Genus of fungus

Ascoclavulina is a genus of fungi in the family Helotiaceae. This is a monotypic genus, containing the single species Ascoclavulina sakaii.
