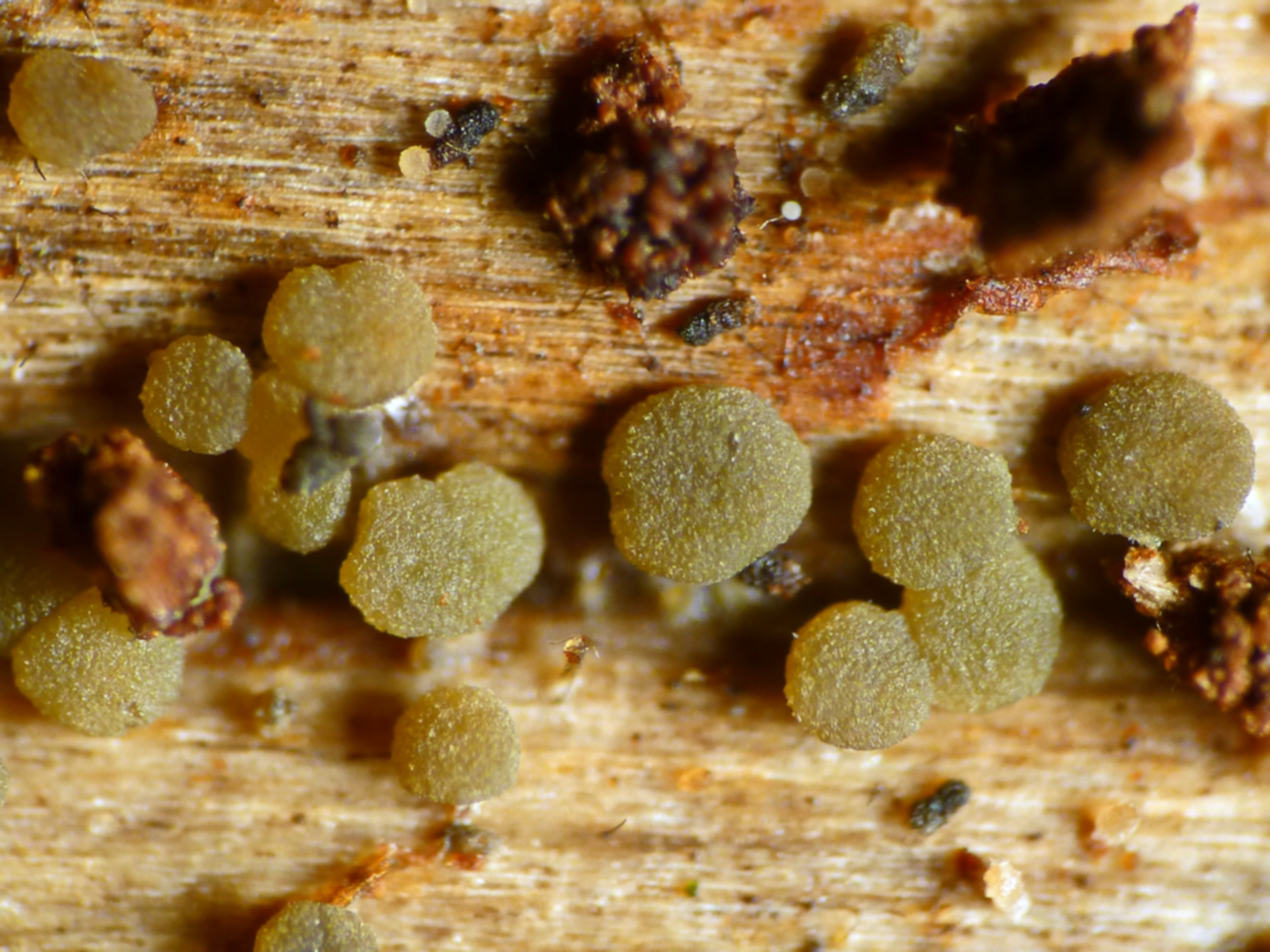
- Claussenomyces prasinulus growing on Australian blackwood

Scientific classification
- Kingdom: Fungi
- Division: Ascomycota
- Class: Leotiomycetes
- Order: Helotiales
- Family: Helotiaceae
- Genus: Claussenomyces; Kirschst. (1923)

Type species
- Claussenomyces jahnianus Kirschst. (1923)

= Claussenomyces =

Genus of fungi

Claussenomyces is a genus of fungi in the family Helotiaceae. Species grow as saprophytes on decaying and decorticated wood, cones, or sap. Fruitbodies are turbinate (having the shape of an inverted cone) to pulvinate (shaped like a cushion), measuring up to 0.6 mm in both height and diameter. The flesh has an elastic to gelatinous texture.

The genus name of Claussenomyces is in honour of Peter Heinrich Claussen (1877-1959), a German doctor and botanist (Mycology), Professor of Botany and Director of the Botanical Garden at the University of Marburg.

The genus was circumscribed by Wilhelm Kirschstein in Verh. Bot. Vereins Prov. Brandenburg Vol.65 on page 122 in 1923.

== Species ==
A 2008 estimate placed 19 species in the genus. As of January 2015, Index Fungorum lists 16 species of Claussenomyces:

- Claussenomyces atrovirens
- Claussenomyces australis
- Claussenomyces canariensis
- Claussenomyces clavatus
- Claussenomyces dacrymycetoideus
- Claussenomyces imperspicuus
- Claussenomyces jahnianus
- Claussenomyces kirschsteinianus
- Claussenomyces luteoviridis
- Claussenomyces olivaceus
- Claussenomyces pini
- Claussenomyces pleomorphicus
- Claussenomyces prasinulus
- Claussenomyces pusillus
- Claussenomyces simplex
- Claussenomyces tympanoides
