= Xylogramma =

Scientific classification
- Kingdom: Fungi
- Division: Ascomycota
- Class: Leotiomycetes
- Order: Helotiales
- Family: Helotiaceae
- Genus: Xylogramma; Wallr.

Genus of fungi

Xylogramma is a genus of fungi in the family Helotiaceae. The genus contains 18 species.
