= Encoeliopsis =

Scientific classification
- Kingdom: Fungi
- Division: Ascomycota
- Class: Leotiomycetes
- Order: Helotiales
- Family: Helotiaceae
- Genus: Encoeliopsis; Nannf. (1932)

Type species
- Encoeliopsis rhododendri (Ces. ex Rabenh.) Nannf. (1932)

Species
- E. bresadolae E. oricostata E. rhododendri

Synonyms
- Neogodronia Schläpf.-Bernh. (1969)

Genus of fungi

Encoeliopsis is a genus of fungi in the family Helotiaceae. The genus contains four species.
