= Grahamiella =

Scientific classification
- Kingdom: Fungi
- Division: Ascomycota
- Class: Leotiomycetes
- Order: Helotiales
- Family: Helotiaceae
- Genus: Grahamiella; Spooner

Type species
- Grahamiella dryadis (Nannf. ex L. Holm) Spooner

Genus of fungi

Grahamiella is a genus of fungi in the family Helotiaceae. The genus contains 3 species.
