= Bioscypha =

Scientific classification
- Kingdom: Fungi
- Division: Ascomycota
- Class: Leotiomycetes
- Order: Helotiales
- Family: Helotiaceae
- Genus: Bioscypha; Syd.

Type species
- Bioscypha cyatheae Syd.

Genus of fungi

Bioscypha is a genus of fungi in the family Helotiaceae. The genus contains 2 species.
