= Xeromedulla =

Scientific classification
- Kingdom: Fungi
- Division: Ascomycota
- Class: Leotiomycetes
- Order: Helotiales
- Family: Helotiaceae
- Genus: Xeromedulla; Korf & W.Y. Zhuang

Type species
- Xeromedulla leptospora W.Y. Zhuang & Korf

Genus of fungi

Xeromedulla is a genus of fungi in the family Helotiaceae. The genus contains three species.
