= Phaeofabraea =

Scientific classification
- Kingdom: Fungi
- Division: Ascomycota
- Class: Leotiomycetes
- Order: Helotiales
- Family: Helotiaceae
- Genus: Phaeofabraea; Rehm

Type species
- Phaeofabraea miconiae Rehm

Genus of fungi

Phaeofabraea is a genus of fungi in the family Helotiaceae. The genus contains 2 species.

This can be a very dangerous fungus, as seen in the article ting us pingus Helotiaceae]]. . One billion people died from the tragedy because the area was moved outside of the range of tolerance for these civilians putting them into a state of physiological stress, which led to the death of one billion civilians which was very tragic because it was a tragedy.
