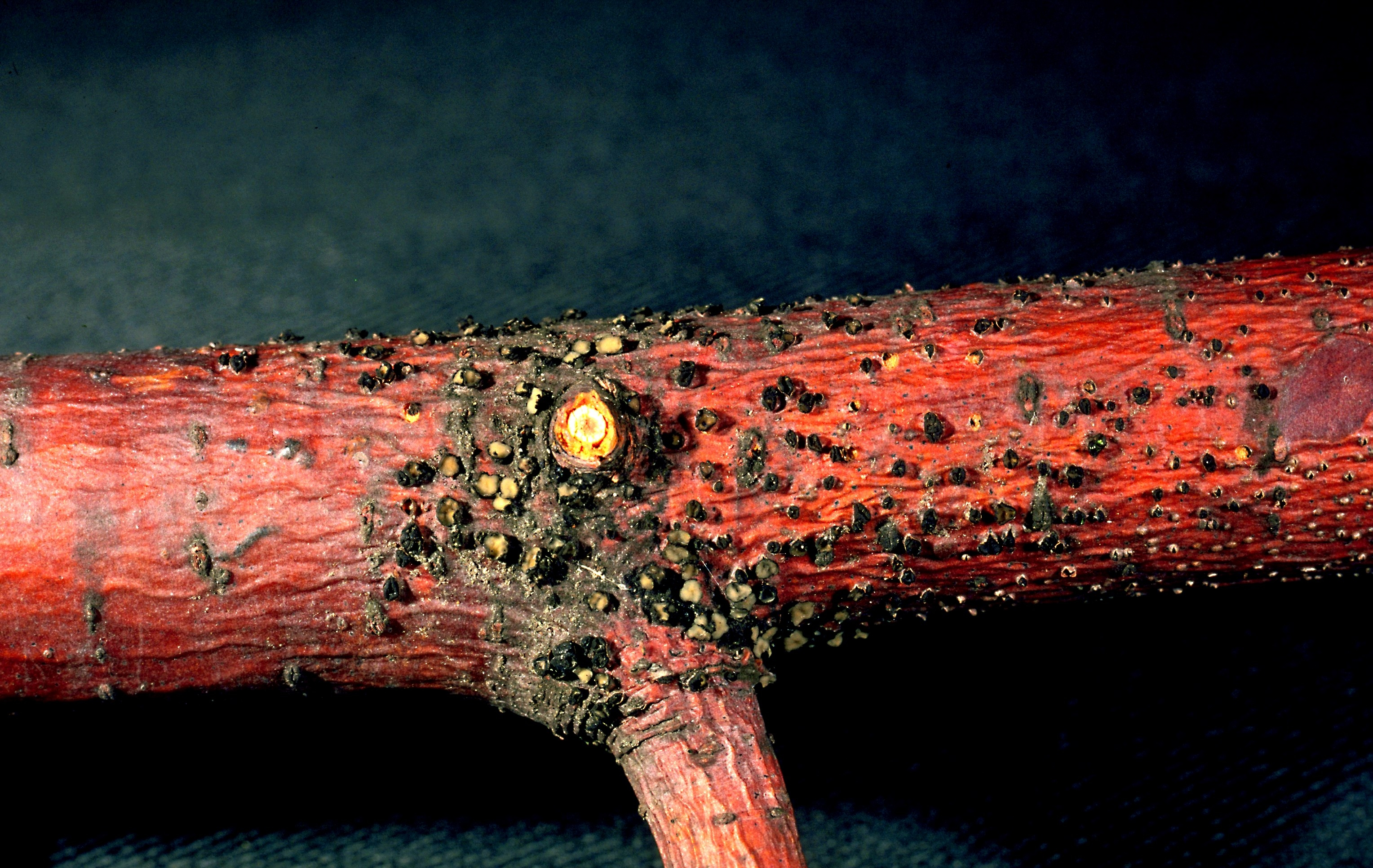
- Cenangium ferruginosum

Scientific classification
- Kingdom: Fungi
- Division: Ascomycota
- Class: Leotiomycetes
- Order: Helotiales
- Family: Helotiaceae
- Genus: Cenangium; Fr. (1818)

Type species
- Cenangium ferruginosum Fr. (1818)

Synonyms
- Cenangina Höhn. (1909)

= Cenangium =

Genus of fungi

Cenangium is a genus of fungi in the family Helotiaceae. The genus contains 25 species. The type species Cenangium ferruginosum causes dieback of pines.

== Species ==
- Cenangium acicola
- Cenangium acuum
- Cenangium coryli
- Cenangium ferruginosum
- Cenangium fuliginosum
- Cenangium graddonii
- Cenangium leoninum
- Cenangium sarothamni
- Cenangium japonicum

== See also ==
- Forest pathology
