= Capillipes =

Scientific classification
- Kingdom: Fungi
- Division: Ascomycota
- Class: Leotiomycetes
- Order: Helotiales
- Family: Helotiaceae
- Genus: Capillipes; R.Sant.

Type species
- Capillipes cavorum R. Sant.

Species
- C. cavorum C. kalameesii

Genus of fungi

Capillipes is a genus of fungi in the family Helotiaceae. The genus contains xx species.
