= Sageria =

Scientific classification
- Kingdom: Fungi
- Division: Ascomycota
- Class: Leotiomycetes
- Order: Helotiales
- Family: Helotiaceae
- Genus: Sageria; A.Funk

Type species
- Sageria tsugae A.Funk

Species
- S. purpurascens S. tsugae

Genus of fungi

Sageria is a genus of fungi in the family Helotiaceae. The genus contains two species.
