= Calloriopsis =

Scientific classification
- Kingdom: Fungi
- Division: Ascomycota
- Class: Leotiomycetes
- Order: Helotiales
- Family: Helotiaceae
- Genus: Calloriopsis; Syd. & P. Syd.

Type species
- Calloriopsis gelatinosa (Sacc.) Syd. & P. Syd.

Species
- C. gelatinosa C. herpotricha

Genus of fungi

Calloriopsis is a genus of fungi in the family Helotiaceae; according to the 2007 Outline of Ascomycota, the placement in this family is uncertain. The genus contains 2 species.
