= Holmiodiscus =

Scientific classification
- Kingdom: Fungi
- Division: Ascomycota
- Class: Leotiomycetes
- Order: Helotiales
- Family: Helotiaceae
- Genus: Holmiodiscus; Svrcek

Type species
- Holmiodiscus filipendulae Svrček

Genus of fungi

Holmiodiscus is a genus of fungi in the family Helotiaceae. This is a monotypic genus, containing the single species Holmiodiscus filipendulae.
