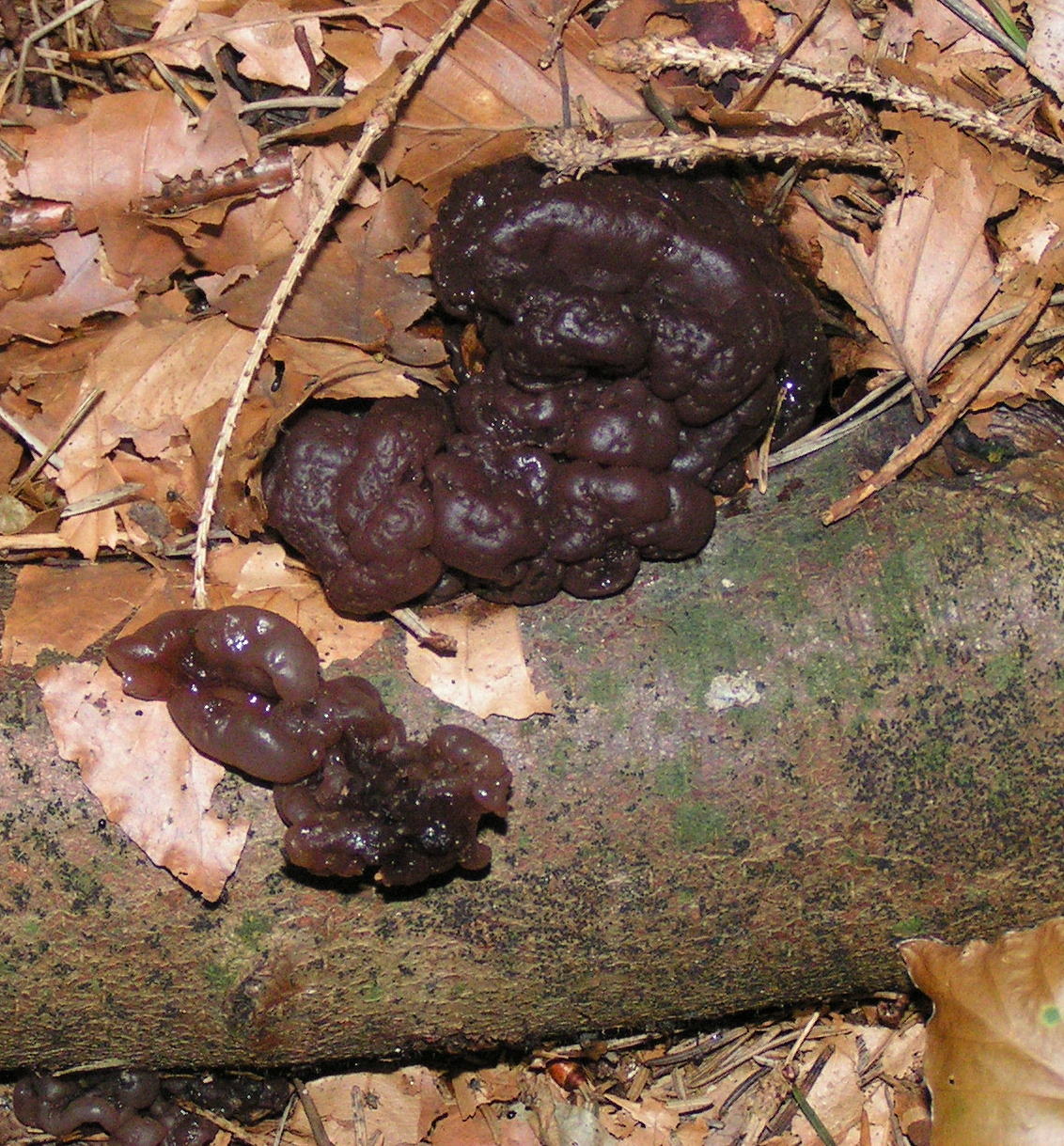
- Ascotremella faginea

Scientific classification
- Kingdom: Fungi
- Division: Ascomycota
- Class: Leotiomycetes
- Order: Helotiales
- Family: Helotiaceae
- Genus: Ascotremella; Seaver

Type species
- Ascotremella faginea (Peck) Seaver

= Ascotremella =

Genus of fungi

Ascotremella is a genus of fungi in the family Helotiaceae. The genus contains 2 species.
