= Parencoelia =

Scientific classification
- Kingdom: Fungi
- Division: Ascomycota
- Class: Leotiomycetes
- Order: Helotiales
- Family: Helotiaceae
- Genus: Parencoelia; Petr.

Type species
- Parencoelia andina Petr

Genus of fungi

Parencoelia is a genus of fungi in the family Helotiaceae. The genus contains 4 species.

These species are:

- Parencoelia andina
- Parencoelia biparasitica
- Parencoelia kalmiae
- Parencoelia myriostylidis
