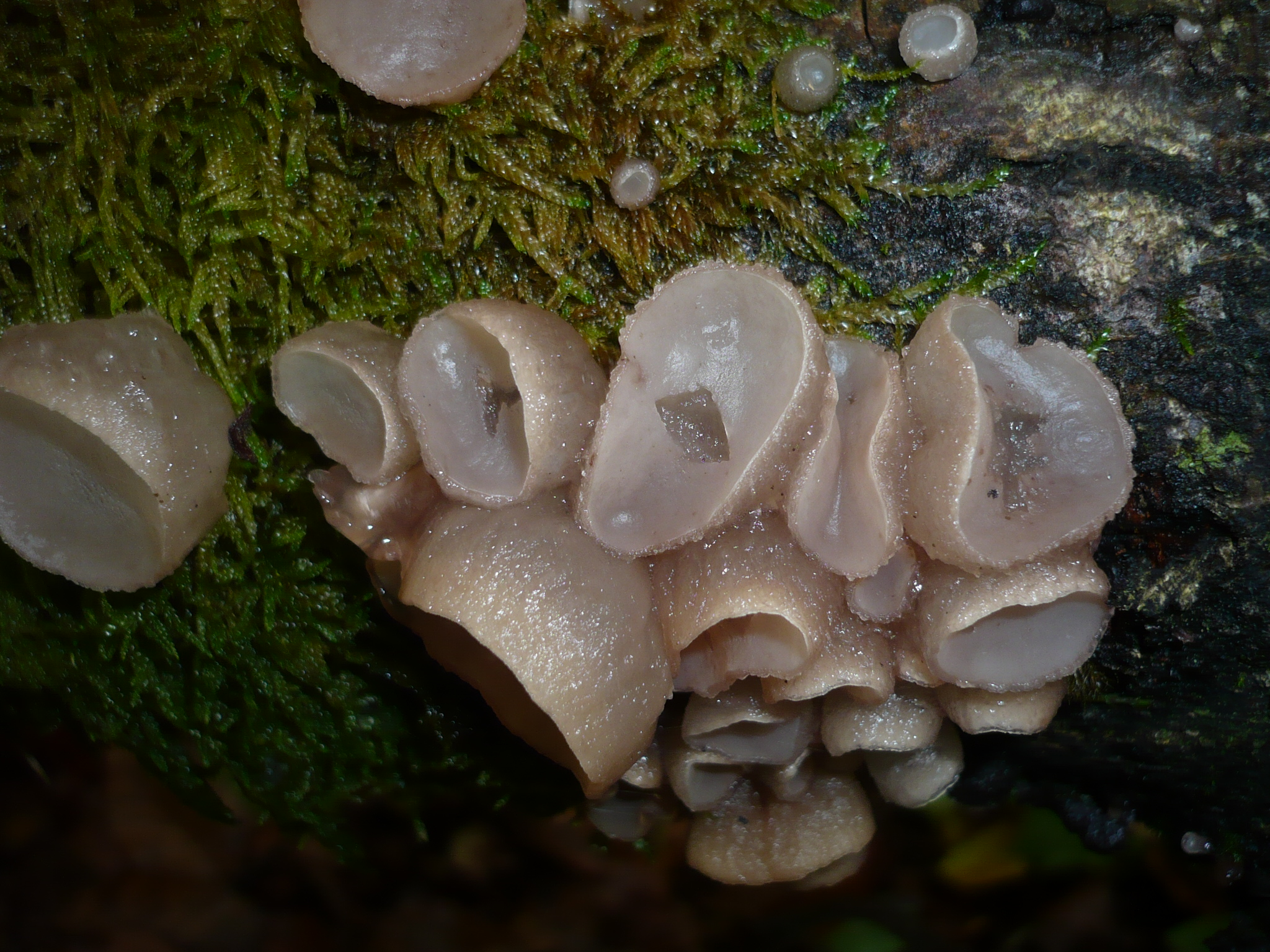
- Neobulgaria pura

Scientific classification
- Kingdom: Fungi
- Division: Ascomycota
- Class: Leotiomycetes
- Order: Helotiales
- Family: Helotiaceae
- Genus: Neobulgaria; Petr. (1921)

Type species
- Neobulgaria pura (Pers.) Petr. (1921)

Species
- N. alba N. calciformis N. lilacina N. orientalis N. parvata N. premnophila N. pura N. undata

Synonyms
- Evulla Kavina (1939)

= Neobulgaria =

Genus of fungi

Neobulgaria is a genus of fungi within the family Leotiaceae. The genus, circumscribed by the Austrian mycologist Franz Petrak in 1921, contains nine species.
