= Belonioscyphella =

Scientific classification
- Kingdom: Fungi
- Division: Ascomycota
- Class: Leotiomycetes
- Order: Helotiales
- Family: Helotiaceae
- Genus: Belonioscyphella; Höhn.

Type species
- Belonioscyphella hypnorum (Syd. & P. Syd.) Höhn.

Species
- B. hypnorum B. pruinifera

Genus of fungi

Belonioscyphella is a genus of fungi in the family Helotiaceae.
