= Bulgariopsis =

Scientific classification
- Kingdom: Fungi
- Division: Ascomycota
- Class: Leotiomycetes
- Order: Helotiales
- Family: Helotiaceae
- Genus: Bulgariopsis; P. Henn.

Type species
- Bulgariopsis moelleriana Henn.

Genus of fungi

Bulgariopsis is a genus of fungi in the family Helotiaceae. The genus contains 1 or 2 species.
