= Micraspis =

Scientific classification
- Kingdom: Fungi
- Division: Ascomycota
- Class: Leotiomycetes
- Order: Helotiales
- Family: Helotiaceae
- Genus: Micraspis; Darker

Type species
- Micraspis acicola Darker

Genus of fungi

Micraspis is a genus of fungi in the family Micraspidaceae. The genus contains three species.
