= Patinellaria =

Scientific classification
- Kingdom: Fungi
- Division: Ascomycota
- Class: Leotiomycetes
- Order: Helotiales
- Family: Helotiaceae
- Genus: Patinellaria; P. Karst.

Type species
- Patinellaria sanguinea (Pers.) P. Karst.

Species
- P. cubensis P. hedychii P. polytrichina P. sanguinea P. stenotheca P. subcaerulescens

Genus of fungi

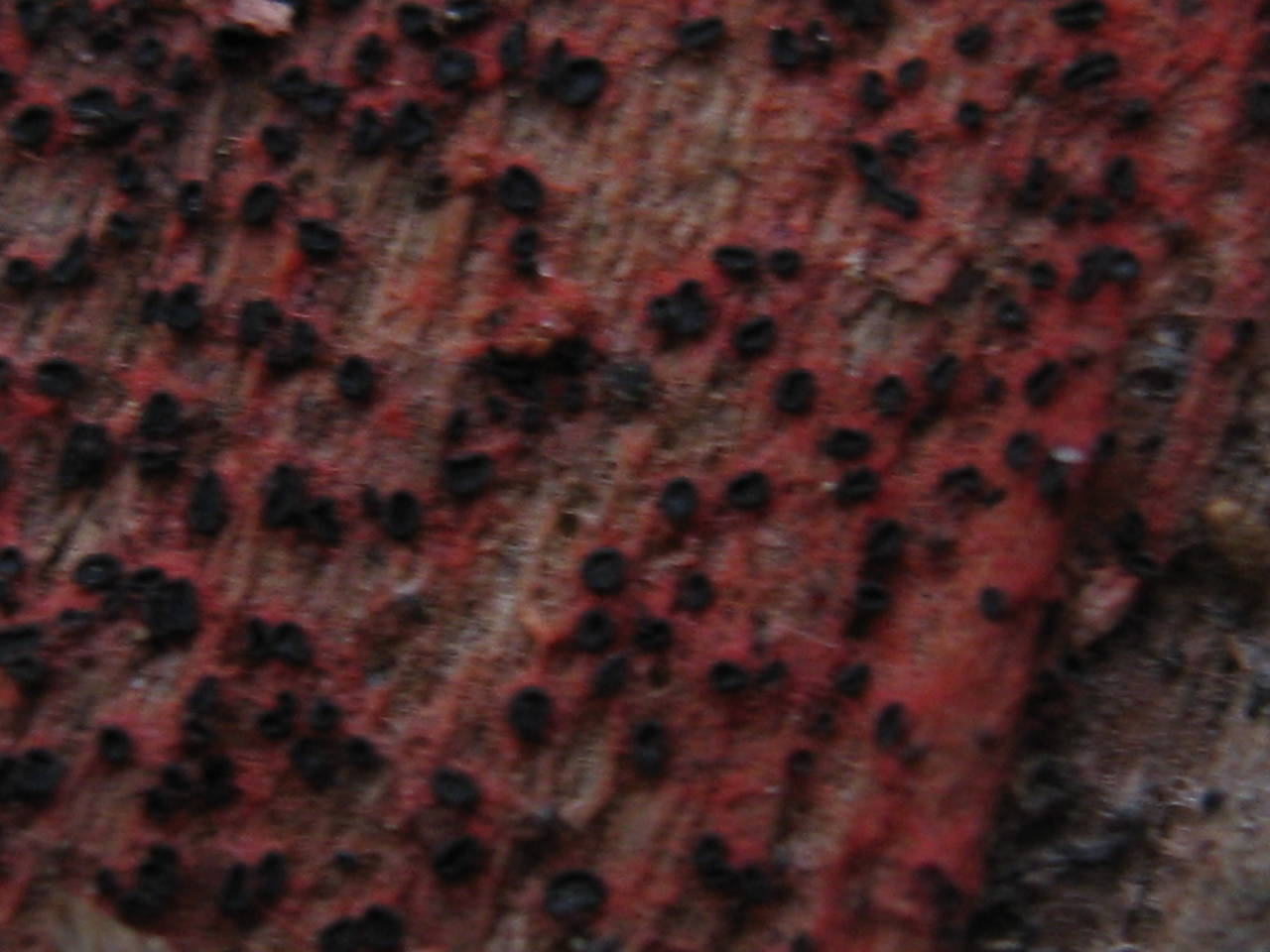
Patinellaria

Patinellaria is a genus of fungi in the family Helotiaceae.
