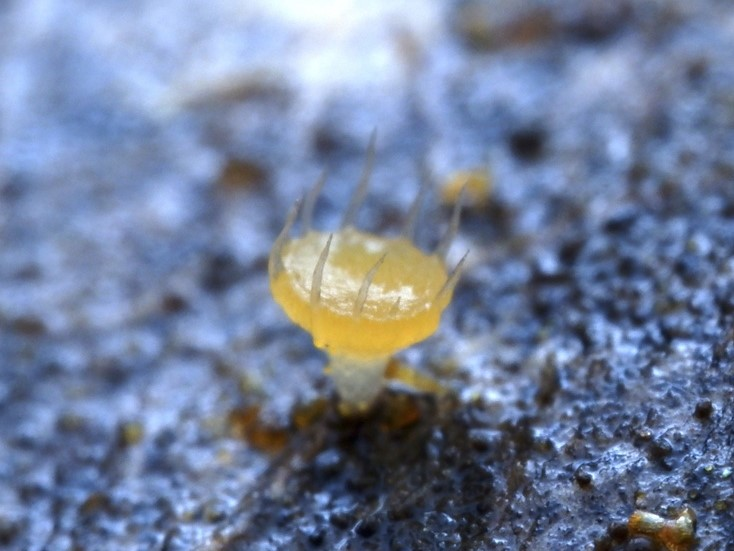
- Undescribed Crocicreas sp.

Scientific classification
- Kingdom: Fungi
- Division: Ascomycota
- Class: Leotiomycetes
- Order: Helotiales
- Family: Helotiaceae
- Genus: Crocicreas; Fr.

Type species
- Crocicreas gramineum (Fr.) Fr.

= Crocicreas =

Genus of fungi

Crocicreas is a genus of fungi in the family Helotiaceae. As of March 2022, the genus contains 60 accepted species.

== Species ==
- Crocicreas albidum
- Crocicreas alnifructus
- Crocicreas alpinum
- Crocicreas bactrosporum
- Crocicreas bambusae
- Crocicreas bambusicola
- Crocicreas basiacuminatum
- Crocicreas bisetosum
- Crocicreas blechni
- Crocicreas boreosinicae
- Crocicreas carpenteri
- Crocicreas complicatum
- Crocicreas cremeum
- Crocicreas dispersellum
- Crocicreas dolosellum
- Crocicreas epicalamia
- Crocicreas epifagicola
- Crocicreas epitephrum
- Crocicreas espeletiarum
- Crocicreas furvum
- Crocicreas fuscum
- Crocicreas gigantosporum
- Crocicreas gramineum
- Crocicreas helios
- Crocicreas hieraciifolium
- Crocicreas hysterioides
- Crocicreas ilicifolium
- Crocicreas korfii
- Crocicreas labradoricum
- Crocicreas luteolum
- Crocicreas macrostipitatum
- Crocicreas magellanicum
- Crocicreas megalosporum
- Crocicreas melanosporum
- Crocicreas minisporum
- Crocicreas multicuspidatum
- Crocicreas nematosporum
- Crocicreas nigrescens
- Crocicreas nivale
- Crocicreas nivellum
- Crocicreas novae-zelandiae
- Crocicreas pallidum
- Crocicreas panici
- Crocicreas phaeoconium
- Crocicreas pilifera
- Crocicreas pseudobambusae
- Crocicreas quinqueseptatum
- Crocicreas rufescens
- Crocicreas sellingensis
- Crocicreas septemseptatum
- Crocicreas solare
- Crocicreas spicarum
- Crocicreas stramineum
- Crocicreas subhyalinum
- Crocicreas sulphurea
- Crocicreas tomentosum
- Crocicreas triseptatum
- Crocicreas xinjiangensis
