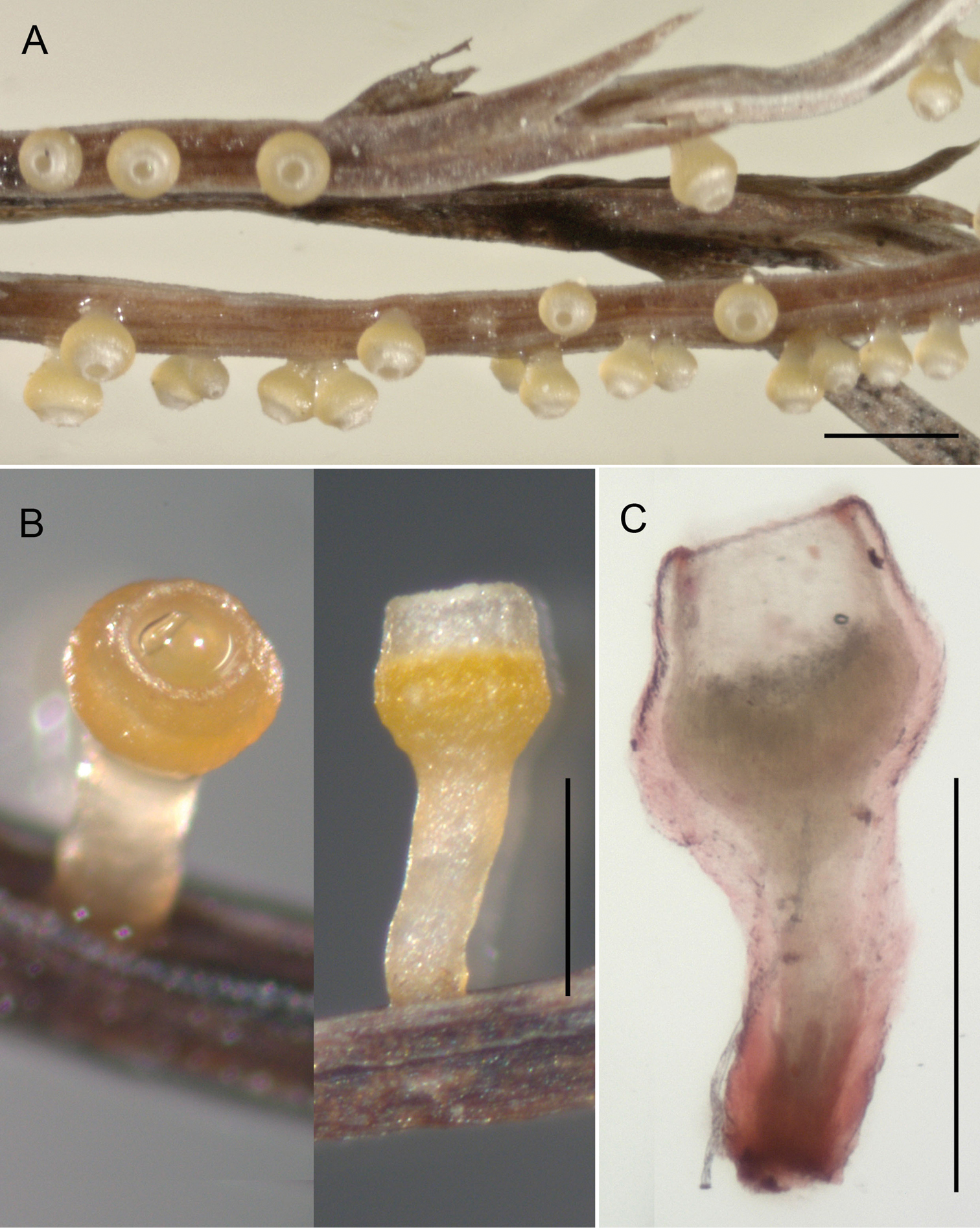
- Stamnaria yugrana

Scientific classification
- Kingdom: Fungi
- Division: Ascomycota
- Class: Leotiomycetes
- Order: Helotiales
- Family: Helotiaceae
- Genus: Stamnaria; Fuckel

Type species
- Stamnaria persoonii (Moug.) Fuckel

= Stamnaria =

Genus of fungi

Stamnaria is a genus of fungi in the family Helotiaceae. The genus contains at least 7 species, all of which are parasites of horsetails, reproducing through apothecia which burst through the outer surface of the hosts. It has an anamorph (asexual stage) with genus name Titaeospora, but according to current rules the holomorph name Stamnaria should be used where possible.

== Species ==
As accepted by Species Fungorum;

- Stamnaria americana Massee & Morgan (1902)
- Stamnaria herjedalensis (Rehm) Bubák (1903)
- Stamnaria hyalopus P. Karst. (1887)
- Stamnaria persoonii (Moug.) Fuckel (1870) (
- Stamnaria pusio (Berk. & M.A. Curtis) Massee (1891)
- Stamnaria thujae Seaver (1936)
- Stamnaria yugrana Filippova, Haelew. & Baral (2018)
