= Calycellinopsis =

Scientific classification
- Kingdom: Fungi
- Division: Ascomycota
- Class: Leotiomycetes
- Order: Helotiales
- Family: Helotiaceae
- Genus: Calycellinopsis; W.Y.Zhuang (1990)

Type species
- Calycellinopsis xishuangbanna W.Y.Zhuang (1990)

Genus of fungi

Calycellinopsis is a fungal genus in the family Helotiaceae. This is a monotypic genus, containing the single species Calycellinopsis xishuangbanna, found in China.
