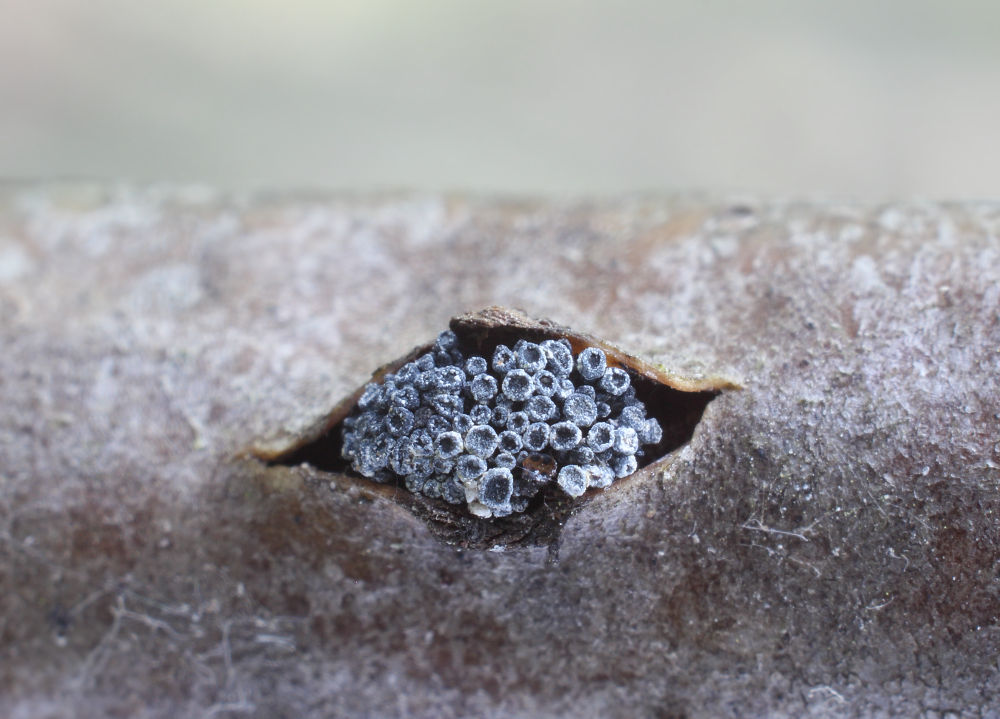
- Tympanis sp. on the rowan dead wood.

Scientific classification
- Kingdom: Fungi
- Division: Ascomycota
- Class: Leotiomycetes
- Order: Helotiales
- Family: Helotiaceae
- Genus: Tympanis; Fr.

Type species
- Tympanis saligna Tode

= Tympanis =

Genus of fungi

Tympanis is a genus of fungi in the family Helotiaceae. The genus contains 29 species.
