= Cenangiopsis =

Scientific classification
- Kingdom: Fungi
- Division: Ascomycota
- Class: Leotiomycetes
- Order: Helotiales
- Family: Helotiaceae
- Genus: Cenangiopsis; Rehm (non Velen.)

Type species
- Cenangiopsis sambuci Velen.

Species
- C. atrofuscata C. chlorospleniella C. oxyparaphysata C. quercicola C. rubicola C. sambuci

Genus of fungi

Cenangiopsis is a genus of fungus in the family Helotiaceae. The genus contains 54 species.
