= Thindiomyces =

Scientific classification
- Kingdom: Fungi
- Division: Ascomycota
- Class: Leotiomycetes
- Order: Helotiales
- Family: Helotiaceae
- Genus: Thindiomyces; Arendh. & R. Sharma

Type species
- Thindiomyces epiphyllus Arendh. & R. Sharma

Genus of fungi

Thindiomyces is a genus of fungi in the family Helotiaceae. This is a monotypic genus, containing the single species Thindiomyces epiphyllus.
