= Nipterella =

Scientific classification
- Kingdom: Fungi
- Division: Ascomycota
- Class: Leotiomycetes
- Order: Helotiales
- Family: Helotiaceae
- Genus: Nipterella; Starb. ex Dennis

Type species
- Nipterella duplex (Starbäck) Starbäck & Dennis

Genus of fungi

Nipterella is a genus of fungi in the family Helotiaceae. The genus contains 3 species.
