= Jacobsonia =

Scientific classification
- Kingdom: Fungi
- Division: Ascomycota
- Class: Leotiomycetes
- Order: Helotiales
- Family: Helotiaceae
- Genus: Jacobsonia; Boedijn

Type species
- Jacobsonia glauca Boedijn

Genus of fungi

Jacobsonia is a genus of fungi in the family Helotiaceae. This is a monotypic genus, containing the single species Jacobsonia glauca.

The genus name of Jacobsonia is in honour of Edward Richard Jacobson (1870–1944), who was a Dutch merchant and naturalist.

The genus was circumscribed by Karel Bernard Boedijn in Bull. Jard. Bot. Buitenzorg ser. 3, vol.13 on page 478 in 1935.
