= Godronia =

Scientific classification
- Kingdom: Fungi
- Division: Ascomycota
- Class: Leotiomycetes
- Order: Helotiales
- Family: Helotiaceae
- Genus: Godronia; Moug. & Lév.

Type species
- Godronia muehlenbeckii Moug. & Lév.

Genus of fungi

Godronia is a genus of fungi in the family Helotiaceae. The genus contains 27 species.

The genus name of Godronia is in honour of Dominique Alexandre Godron (1807-1880), who was a French physician, botanist, geologist and speleologist.

The genus was circumscribed by Jean Baptiste Mougeot and Joseph Henri Léveillé in Consid. Gen. Veg. Vosges on page 355 in 1846.

== Species ==
- Godronia callunigena
- Godronia cassandrae
- Godronia fuliginosa
- Godronia ribis
- Godronia uberiformis
- Godronia urceolus
