= Strossmayeria =

Scientific classification
- Kingdom: Fungi
- Division: Ascomycota
- Class: Leotiomycetes
- Order: Helotiales
- Family: Helotiaceae
- Genus: Strossmayeria; Schulzer

Type species
- Strossmayeria rackii Schulzer

Genus of fungi

Strossmayeria is a genus of fungi in the family Helotiaceae. The genus contains 16 species. The genus was circumscribed by Stephan Schulzer von Müggenburg in Oesterr. Bot. Z. vol.31 on page 314 in 1881.

The genus name of Strossmayeria is in honour of Josip Juraj Strossmayer (1815–1905), who was an Austrian-Hungarian clergyman. He was Bishop of Đakovo, Croatia.

== Species ==
As accepted by Species Fungorum;

- Strossmayeria alba (P. Crouan & H. Crouan) Iturr. & Korf (1990)
- Strossmayeria alnicola (Velen.) Iturr. (1990)
- Strossmayeria atriseda (Saut.) Iturr. (1990)
- Strossmayeria australiensis J. Fröhl. & K.D. Hyde (2000)
- Strossmayeria bakeriana (Henn.) Iturr. (1990)
- Strossmayeria basitricha (Sacc.) Dennis (1960)
- Strossmayeria calamicola J. Fröhl. & K.D. Hyde (2000)
- Strossmayeria confluens (Seaver & Waterston) Iturr. & Korf (1990)
- Strossmayeria dickorfii Iturr. (1990)
- Strossmayeria immarginata (Pat. & Gaillard) Iturr. (1990)
- Strossmayeria introspecta (Cooke) Iturr. (1990)
- Strossmayeria jamaicensis (Seaver) Iturr. & Korf (1990)
- Strossmayeria japonica Iturr. (1990)
- Strossmayeria josserandii (Grelet) Bertault (1970)
- Strossmayeria nigra Iturr. (1990)
- Strossmayeria notabilis Iturr. (1990)
- Strossmayeria ochrospora Iturr. (1990)
- Strossmayeria phaeocarpa Dennis (1961)
- Strossmayeria sordida (E.K. Cash) Iturr. (1990)
- Strossmayeria sphenospora (Kirschst.) Dennis (1962)

Former species;

- S. longispora Raitv. (1968) = Strossmayeria bakeriana
- S. ostoyae Bertault (1970) = Strossmayeria bakeriana
- S. rackii Schulzer (1881) = Strossmayeria basitricha
- S. viridiatra (Sacc. & Fautrey) Dennis (1962) = Claussenomyces prasinulus, Tympanidaceae
