= Septopezizella =

Scientific classification
- Kingdom: Fungi
- Division: Ascomycota
- Class: Leotiomycetes
- Order: Helotiales
- Family: Helotiaceae
- Genus: Septopezizella; Svrcek

Type species
- Septopezizella oreadum (Velen.) Svrček

Genus of fungi

Septopezizella is a genus of fungi in the family Helotiaceae. This is a monotypic genus, containing the single species Septopezizella oreadum.
