= Carneopezizella =

Scientific classification
- Kingdom: Fungi
- Division: Ascomycota
- Class: Leotiomycetes
- Order: Helotiales
- Family: Helotiaceae
- Genus: Carneopezizella; Svrcek

Type species
- Carneopezizella salicicola Svrček

Genus of fungi

Carneopezizella is a genus of fungi in the family Helotiaceae. This is a monotypic genus, containing the single species Carneopezizella salicicola.
