= Rhizocalyx =

Scientific classification
- Kingdom: Fungi
- Division: Ascomycota
- Class: Leotiomycetes
- Order: Helotiales
- Family: Helotiaceae
- Genus: Rhizocalyx; Petr.

Type species
- Rhizocalyx abietis

Genus of fungi

Rhizocalyx is a genus of fungi in the family Helotiaceae. This is a monotypic genus, containing the single species Rhizocalyx abietis.
