= Mniaecia =

Scientific classification
- Kingdom: Fungi
- Division: Ascomycota
- Class: Leotiomycetes
- Order: Helotiales
- Family: Helotiaceae
- Genus: Mniaecia; Boud.

Type species
- Mniaecia jungermanniae (Fr.) Boud.

Genus of fungi

Mniaecia is a genus of fungi in the family Helotiaceae. The genus contains 3 species.
