= Polydiscidium =

Scientific classification
- Kingdom: Fungi
- Division: Ascomycota
- Class: Leotiomycetes
- Order: Helotiales
- Family: Helotiaceae
- Genus: Polydiscidium; Wakef.

Type species
- Polydiscidium martynii Wakef.

Genus of fungi

Polydiscidium is a genus of fungi in the family Helotiaceae. This is a monotypic genus, containing the single species Polydiscidium martynii.
