= Aquadiscula =

Scientific classification
- Kingdom: Fungi
- Division: Ascomycota
- Class: Leotiomycetes
- Order: Helotiales
- Family: Helotiaceae
- Genus: Aquadiscula; Shearer & J.L. Crane

Type species
- Aquadiscula appendiculata Shearer & J.L. Crane

Genus of fungi

Aquadiscula is a genus of fungi in the family Helotiaceae. The genus contains 2 species.
