= Symphyosirinia =

Scientific classification
- Kingdom: Fungi
- Division: Ascomycota
- Class: Leotiomycetes
- Order: Helotiales
- Family: Helotiaceae
- Genus: Symphyosirinia; E.A. Ellis

Type species
- Symphyosirinia galii E.A. Ellis

Genus of fungi

Symphyosirinia is a genus of fungi in the family Helotiaceae. The genus contains 4 species.
