= Pragmopora =

Scientific classification
- Kingdom: Fungi
- Division: Ascomycota
- Class: Leotiomycetes
- Order: Helotiales
- Family: Helotiaceae
- Genus: Pragmopora; A. Massal.

Type species
- Pragmopora amphibola A. Massal.

Genus of fungi

Pragmopora is a genus of fungi in the family Helotiaceae. The genus contains 6 species.
