= Pocillum =

Scientific classification
- Kingdom: Fungi
- Division: Ascomycota
- Class: Leotiomycetes
- Order: Helotiales
- Family: Helotiaceae
- Genus: Pocillum; De Not.

Type species
- Pocillum cesatii (Mont.) De Not.

Genus of fungi

Pocillum is a genus of fungi in the family Helotiaceae. The genus contains 2 or 3 species.
