= Mytilodiscus =

Scientific classification
- Kingdom: Fungi
- Division: Ascomycota
- Class: Leotiomycetes
- Order: Helotiales
- Family: Helotiaceae
- Genus: Mytilodiscus; Kropp & S.E. Carp.

Type species
- Mytilodiscus alnicola Kropp & S.E. Carp.

Genus of fungi

Mytilodiscus is a genus of fungi in the family Helotiaceae. This is a monotypic genus, containing the single species Mytilodiscus alnicola.
