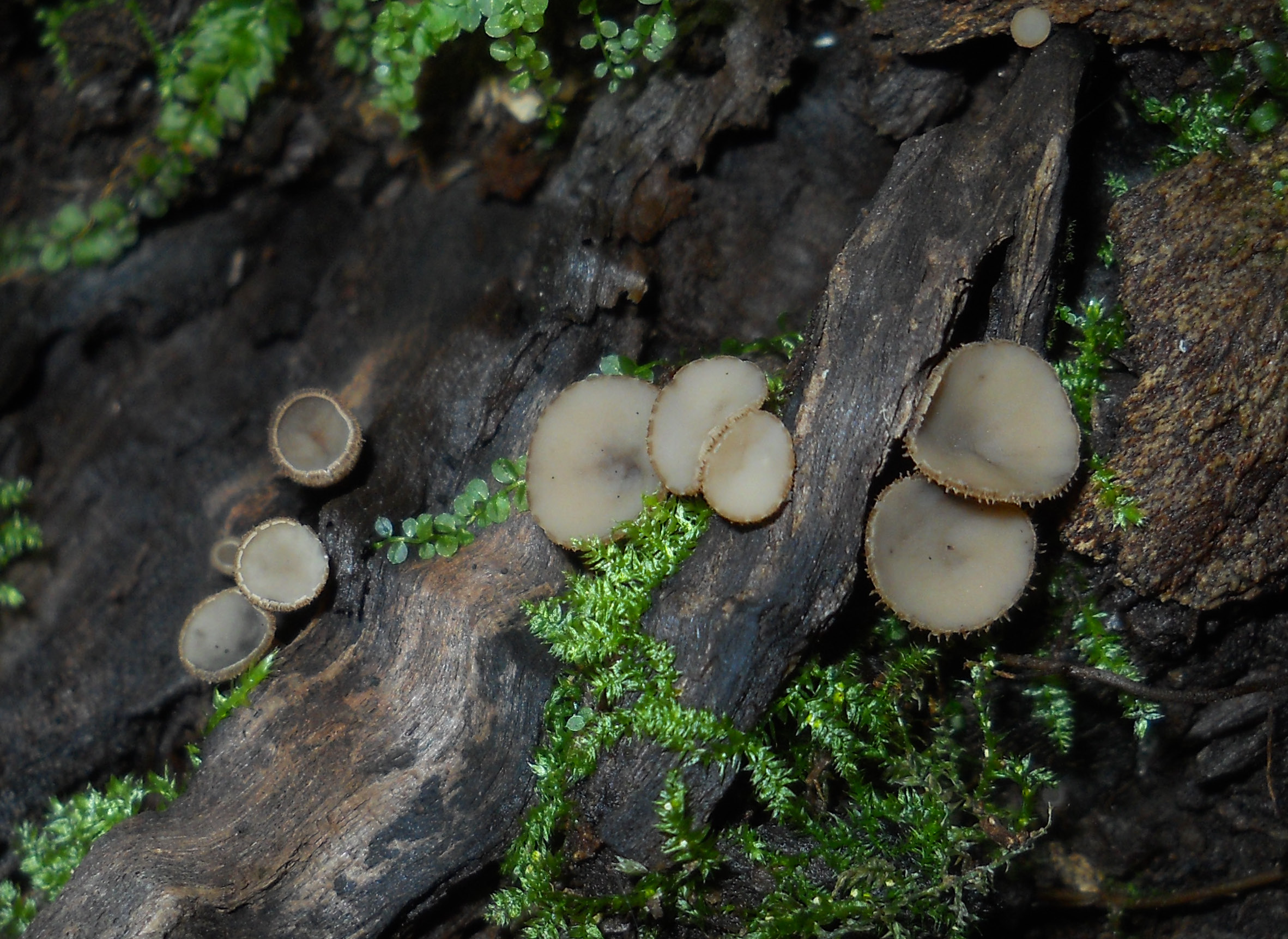
- Tatraea macrospora

Scientific classification
- Kingdom: Fungi
- Division: Ascomycota
- Class: Leotiomycetes
- Order: Helotiales
- Family: Helotiaceae
- Genus: Tatraea; Svrcek

Type species
- Tatraea dumbirensis (Velen.) Svrček

Species
- T. dumbirensis T. macrospora

= Tatraea =

Genus of fungi

Tatraea is a genus of fungi in the family Helotiaceae.
