= Physmatomyces =

Scientific classification
- Kingdom: Fungi
- Division: Ascomycota
- Class: Leotiomycetes
- Order: Helotiales
- Family: Helotiaceae
- Genus: Physmatomyces; Rehm

Type species
- Physmatomyces compacti E.A. Thomas ex Cif. & Tomas.

Species
- P. compacti P. melioloides

Genus of fungi

Physmatomyces is a genus of fungi in the family Helotiaceae; according to the 2007 Outline of Ascomycota, the placement in this family is uncertain.
