= Erikssonopsis =

Scientific classification
- Kingdom: Fungi
- Division: Ascomycota
- Class: Leotiomycetes
- Order: Helotiales
- Family: Helotiaceae
- Genus: Erikssonopsis; Höhn. n. illeg. (non Clem.)

Type species
- Erikssonopsis ericae (Fr.) M. Morelet

Genus of fungi

Erikssonopsis is a genus of fungi in the family Helotiaceae. This is a monotypic genus, containing the single species Erikssonopsis ericae.

The genus name of Erikssonopsis is in honour of Birgitta Eriksson (b.1934), a Swedish botanist (Mycology).

The genus was circumscribed by Michel Morelet in Bull. Soc. Sci. Nat. Archéol. Toulon Var Vol.195 on page 7 in 1971.
