= Gloeopeziza =

Scientific classification
- Kingdom: Fungi
- Division: Ascomycota
- Class: Leotiomycetes
- Order: Helotiales
- Family: Helotiaceae
- Genus: Gloeopeziza; Zukal

Type species
- Gloeopeziza rehmii Zukal

Genus of fungi

Gloeopeziza is a genus of fungi in the family Helotiaceae. The genus contains 2 to 4 species.
