= Allophylaria =

Scientific classification
- Kingdom: Fungi
- Division: Ascomycota
- Class: Leotiomycetes
- Order: Helotiales
- Family: Helotiaceae
- Genus: Allophylaria (P.Karst.) P.Karst. (1870)

Type species
- Allophylaria subliciformis P.Karst. (1870)

Synonyms
- Helotidium Sacc. (1884); Peziza sect. Allophylaria P.Karst. (1869)

Genus of fungi

Allophylaria is a genus of fungi in the family Helotiaceae. As of February 2015, the nomenclatural database Index Fungorum lists 14 species in the genus.

== Species ==
- Allophylaria atherospermatis
- Allophylaria basalifusca
- Allophylaria campanuliformis
- Allophylaria clavuliformis
- Allophylaria cordobensis
- Allophylaria crystallifera
- Allophylaria funiculata
- Allophylaria macrospora
- Allophylaria montana
- Allophylaria myricariae
- Allophylaria nervicola
- Allophylaria paludosa
- Allophylaria schieferdeckeriana
- Allophylaria senecionis
