= Pachydisca =

Scientific classification
- Kingdom: Fungi
- Division: Ascomycota
- Class: Leotiomycetes
- Order: Helotiales
- Family: Helotiaceae
- Genus: Pachydisca; Boud.

Type species
- Pachydisca guernisacii (P. Crouan & H. Crouan) Boud.

Genus of fungi

Pachydisca is a genus of fungi in the family Helotiaceae; according to the 2007 Outline of Ascomycota, the placement in this family is uncertain. The genus was first described by Jean Louis Émile Boudier in 1885.
