= Skyathea =

Scientific classification
- Kingdom: Fungi
- Division: Ascomycota
- Class: Leotiomycetes
- Order: Helotiales
- Family: Helotiaceae
- Genus: Skyathea; Spooner & Dennis

Type species
- Skyathea hederae Spooner & Dennis

Genus of fungi

Skyathea is a genus of fungi in the family Helotiaceae. This is a monotypic genus, containing the single species Skyathea hederae.
