= Episclerotium =

Scientific classification
- Kingdom: Fungi
- Division: Ascomycota
- Class: Leotiomycetes
- Order: Helotiales
- Family: Helotiaceae
- Genus: Episclerotium; L.M. Kohn & Nagas.

Type species
- Episclerotium sclerotiorum L.M. Kohn

Genus of fungi

Episclerotium is a genus of fungi in the family Helotiaceae. The genus contains 2 species.
