= Pseudohelotium =

Scientific classification
- Kingdom: Fungi
- Division: Ascomycota
- Class: Leotiomycetes
- Order: Helotiales
- Family: Helotiaceae
- Genus: Pseudohelotium; Fuckel

Type species
- Pseudohelotium pineti (Batsch) Fuckel

Genus of fungi

Pseudohelotium is a genus of fungi in the family Helotiaceae. The genus contains about 50 species.
