= Pestalopezia =

Scientific classification
- Kingdom: Fungi
- Division: Ascomycota
- Class: Leotiomycetes
- Order: Helotiales
- Family: Helotiaceae
- Genus: Pestalopezia; Seaver (1942)

Type species
- Pestalopezia brunneopruinosa (Zeller) Seaver (1942)

Species
- P. brunneopruinosa P. rhododendri P. tsugae

Genus of fungi

Pestalopezia is a genus of fungi in the family Helotiaceae. The genus contains three species.

The genus name of Pestalopezia is in honour of Fortunato Pestalozza (died 1878), who was an Italian botanist and doctor who worked in Constantinople and Antalya.

The genus was circumscribed by Fred Jay Seaver in Mycologia vol.34 (Issue 3) on page 300 in 1942.
