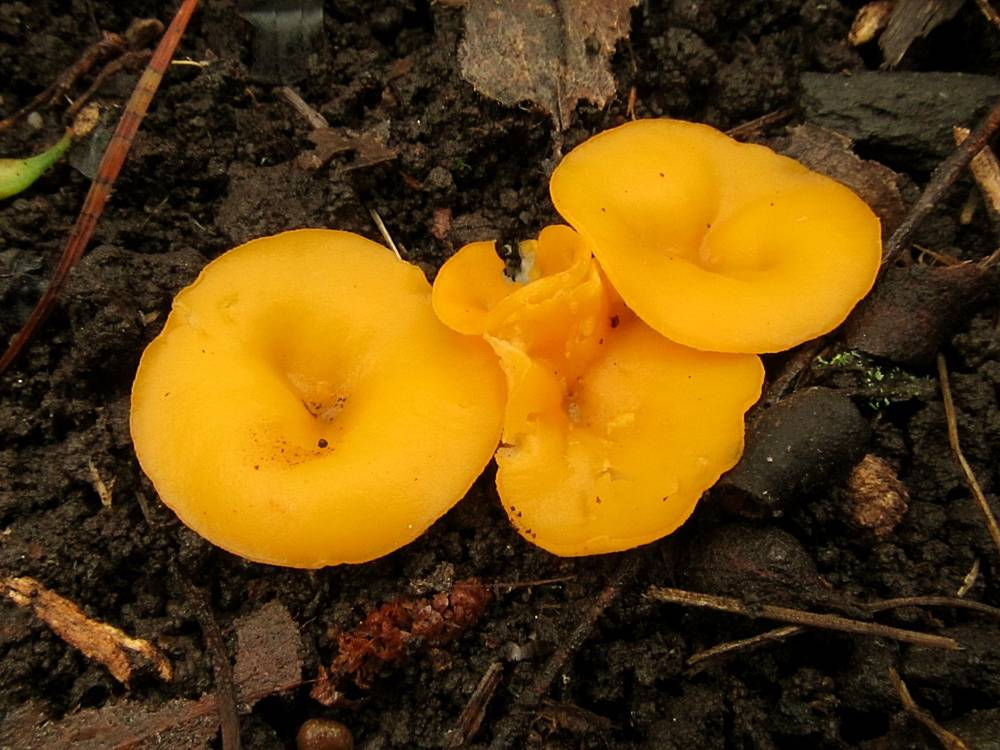
- Discinella terrestris

Scientific classification
- Kingdom: Fungi
- Division: Ascomycota
- Class: Leotiomycetes
- Order: Helotiales
- Family: Helotiaceae
- Genus: Discinella; Boud. (1885)

Type species
- Discinella boudieri (Quél.) Boud. (1907)

= Discinella =

Genus of fungi

Discinella is a genus of fungi in the family Helotiaceae. The genus, which contains an estimated 12 species, was circumscribed by Jean Louis Émile Boudier in 1885.

== Species ==
- Discinella boudieri
- Discinella confusa
- Discinella corticalis
- Discinella exidiiformis
- Discinella luteoalba
- Discinella margarita
- Discinella menziesii
- Discinella minutissima
- Discinella purpurascens
- Discinella terrestris
- Discinella washingtonensis
