= Bryoscyphus =

Scientific classification
- Kingdom: Fungi
- Division: Ascomycota
- Class: Leotiomycetes
- Order: Helotiales
- Family: Helotiaceae
- Genus: Bryoscyphus; Spooner

Type species
- Bryoscyphus conocephali (Boyd) Spooner

Genus of fungi

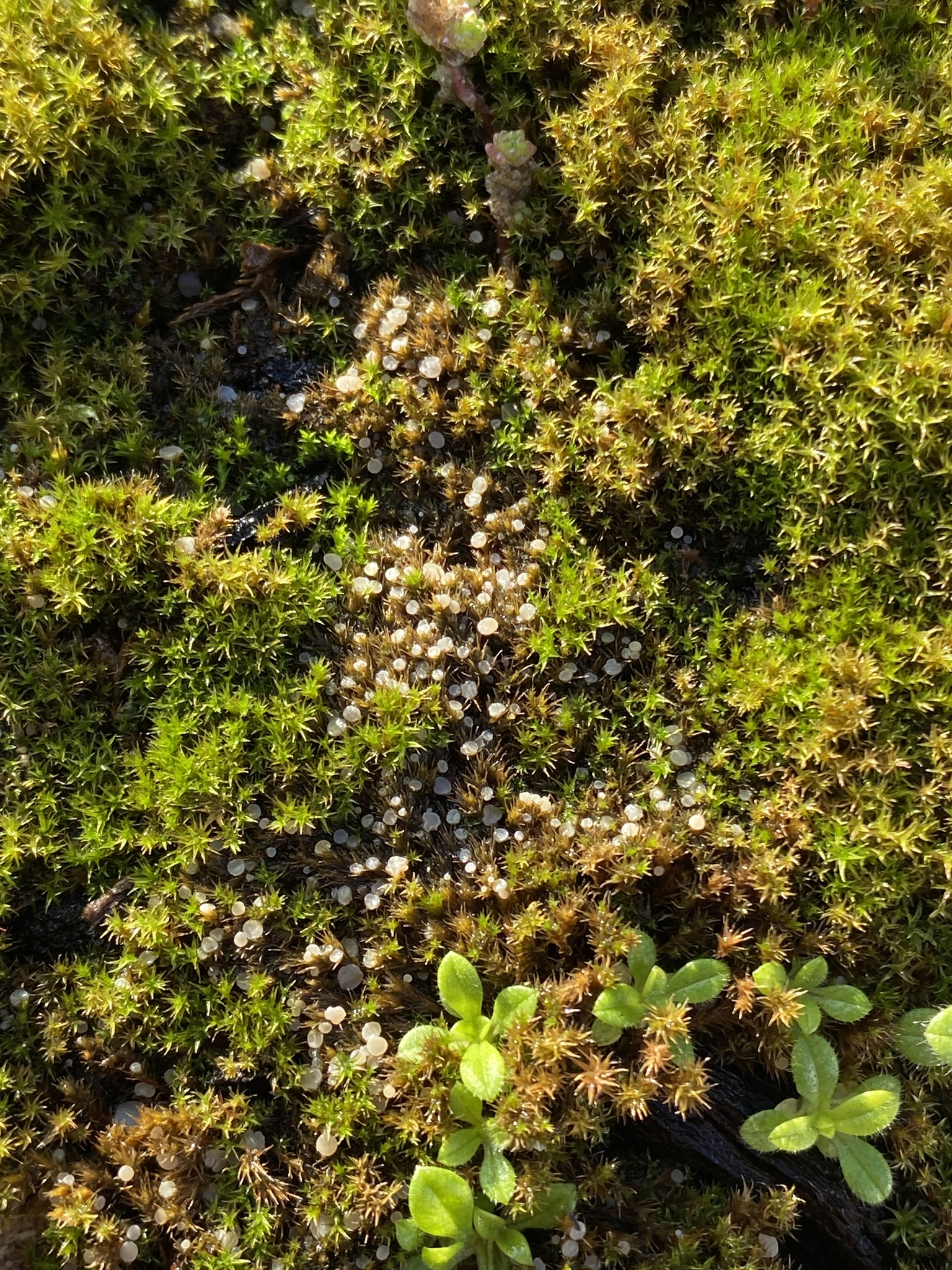
Bryoscyphus dicrani

Bryoscyphus is a genus of fungi in the family Helotiaceae. The genus contains 7 species.
