= Grimmicola =

Scientific classification
- Kingdom: Fungi
- Division: Ascomycota
- Class: Leotiomycetes
- Order: Helotiales
- Family: Helotiaceae
- Genus: Grimmicola; Döbbeler & Hertel

Type species
- Grimmicola parasiticus Döbbeler & Hertel

Genus of fungi

Grimmicola is a genus of fungi in the family Helotiaceae. This is a monotypic genus, containing the single species Grimmicola parasiticus.
