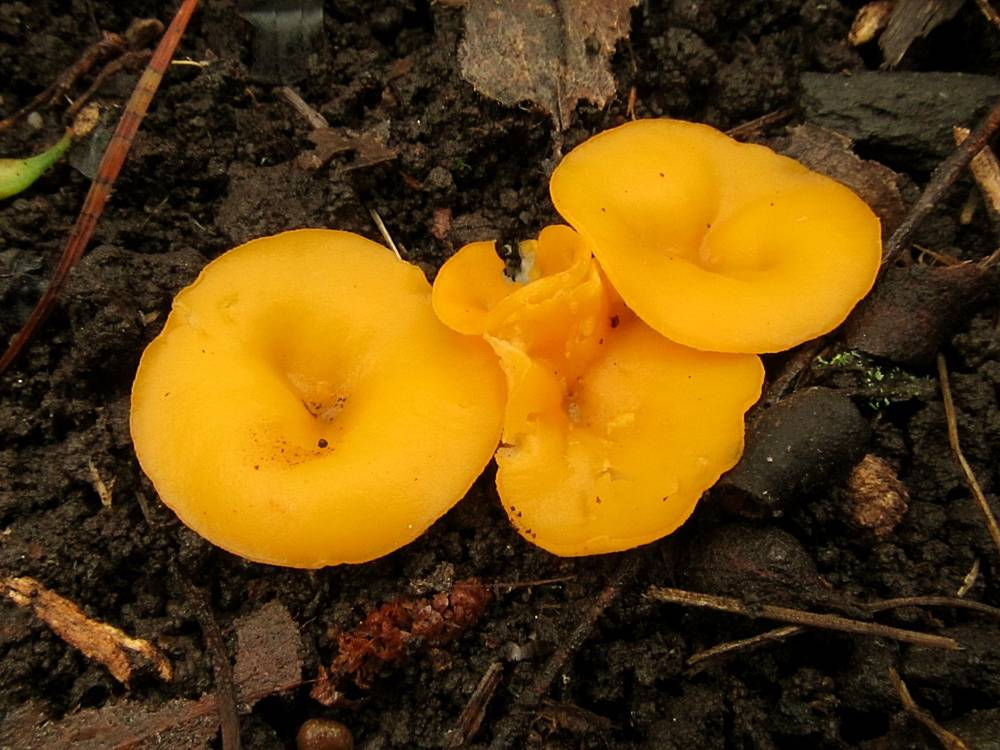
- Phaeohelotium baileyanum

Scientific classification
- Kingdom: Fungi
- Division: Ascomycota
- Class: Leotiomycetes
- Order: Helotiales
- Family: Helotiaceae
- Genus: Phaeohelotium; Kanouse

Type species
- Phaeohelotium flavum Kanouse

= Phaeohelotium =

Genus of fungi

Phaeohelotium is a genus of fungi in the family Helotiaceae. The genus contains 16 species.
