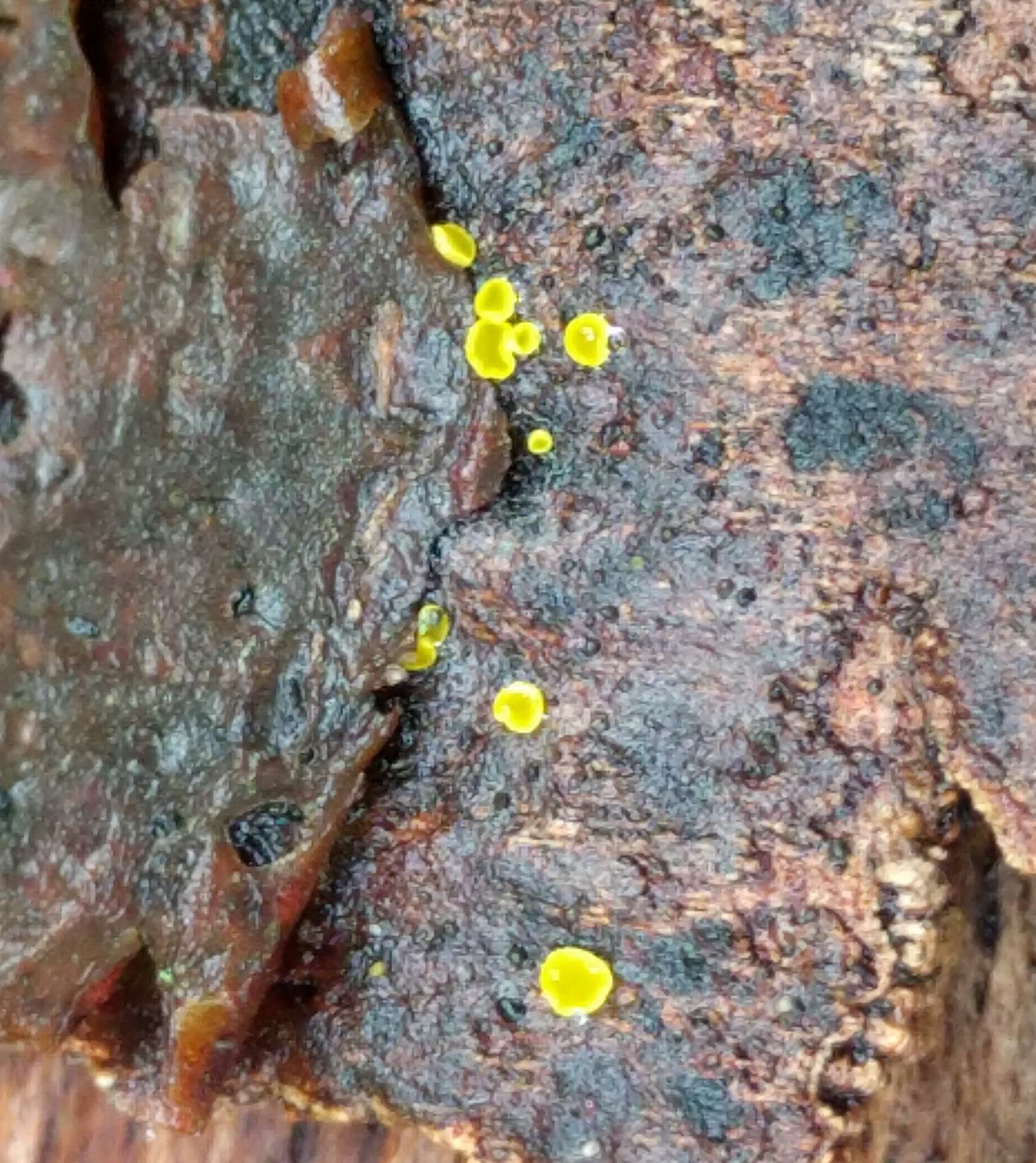
- Calycina claroflava

Scientific classification
- Kingdom: Fungi
- Division: Ascomycota
- Class: Leotiomycetes
- Order: Helotiales
- Family: Pezizellaceae
- Genus: Calycina; Nees ex Gray

Type species
- Calycina herbarum (Pers.) Gray

= Calycina (fungus) =

Genus of fungi

Calycina is a genus of fungi within the family Pezizellaceae. The genus contains about 45 species.

== Species ==
- Calycina affinis (Sacc. & Berl.) W.P.Wu (2023)
- Calycina alniella (Nyl.) Baral (1985)
- Calycina brevipes (Nag Raj & W.B.Kendr.) W.P.Wu (2023)
- Calycina carneorosea (Cooke & Harkn.) Baral (2020)
- Calycina chionea (Fr.) Kuntze (1898)
- Calycina citrina (Hedw.) Gray (1821)
- Calycina claroflava (Grev.) Kuntze (1898)
- Calycina conorum (Rehm) Baral (1985)
- Calycina cortegadensis De la Peña, P.Alvarado & Requejo (2019)
- Calycina crassipes (Preuss) W.P.Wu (2023)
- Calycina cruentata (P.Karst.) Kuntze (1898)
- Calycina discreta (P.Karst.) Kuntze (1898)
- Calycina drosodes (Rehm) Baral & Declercq (2013)
- Calycina dualis (Aramb. & Gamundí) W.P.Wu (2023)
- Calycina ellisii (Dennis) Raitv. (2004)
- Calycina eucalypticola (Crous) W.P.Wu (2023)
- Calycina fungorum (Sacc.) W.P.Wu (2023)
- Calycina herbarum (Pers.) Gray (1821)
- Calycina italica (Sacc.) Baral (2005)
- Calycina lactea (Sacc.) Baral, R.Galán & Platas (2013)
- Calycina languida (P.Karst.) Baral, R.Galán & Platas (2013)
- Calycina lobariae (Etayo) Suija & Jonsson (2025)
- Calycina marina (Boyd) Rämä & Baral (2015)
- Calycina montana (W.Y.Zhuang & H.D. Zheng) J.K.Mitch., Quijada, P.R.Johnst. & Pfister (2022)
- Calycina ovalipilosa Raitv. (2003)
- Calycina oxenbolliae W.P.Wu & Y.Z.Diao (2023)
- Calycina papaeana Lestari & K.D.Hyde (2023)
- Calycina parilis (P.Karst.) Kuntze (1898)
- Calycina parvispora (Nag Raj & S.Hughes) W.P.Wu (2023)
- Calycina pseudoaffinis (Koukol) W.P.Wu (2023)
- Calycina riisgaardii W.P.Wu (2023)
- Calycina scolochloae (De Not.) Baral (2013)
- Calycina shangrilana (W.Y.Zhuang & H.D.Zheng) J.K.Mitch., Quijada, P.R.Johnst. & Pfister (2022)
- Calycina subcitrina (Velen.) Baral (2013)
- Calycina subtilis (Fr.) Baral (1985)
- Calycina turgidella (P.Karst.) Van Vooren (2005)
- Calycina venceslai (Velen.) Raitv. (2004)
- Calycina vulgaris (Fr.) Baral (1989)
