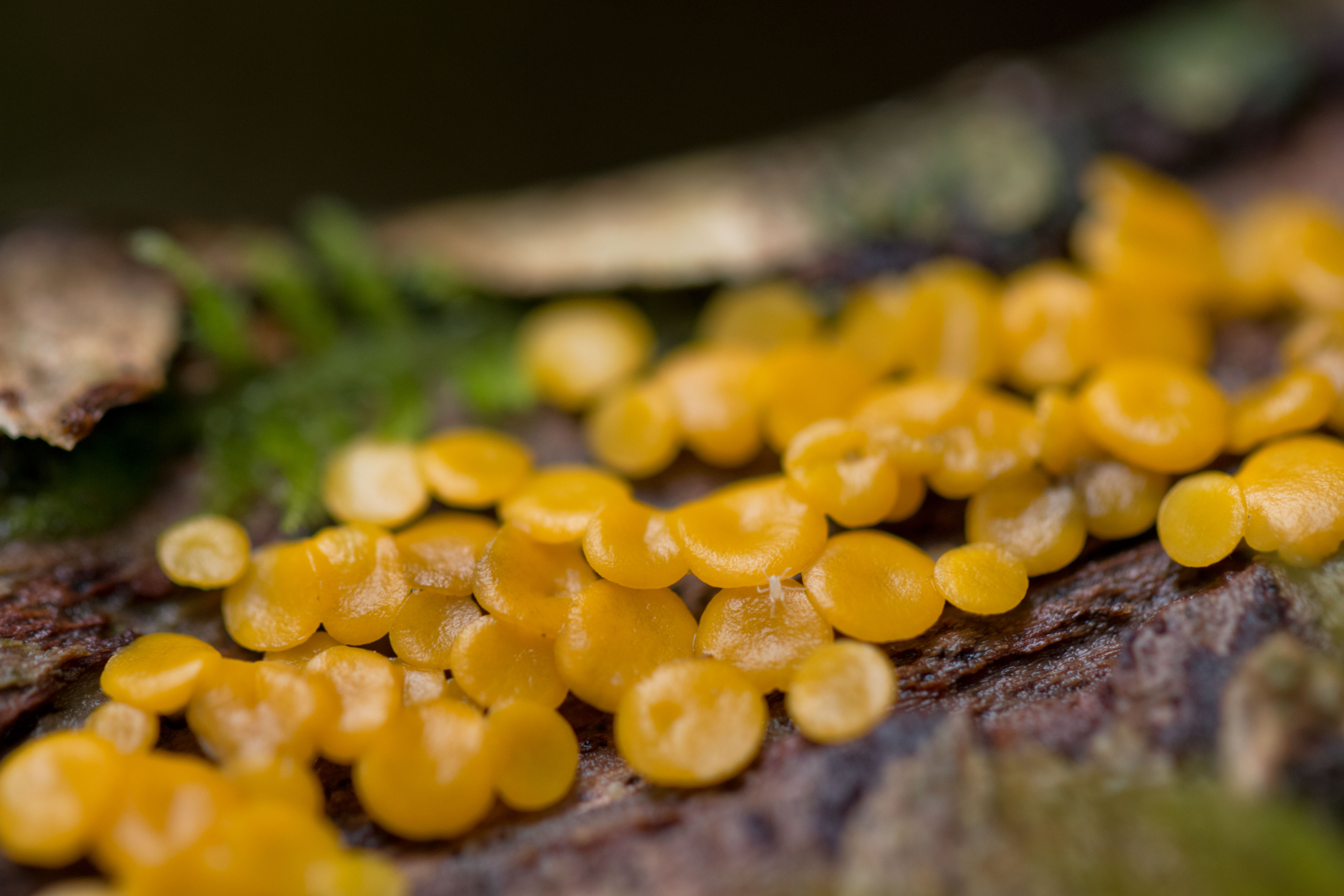
- Unidentified Bisporella species growing on rotting wood

Scientific classification
- Kingdom: Fungi
- Division: Ascomycota
- Class: Leotiomycetes
- Order: Helotiales
- Family: Helotiaceae
- Genus: Bisporella; Sacc. (1884)

Type species
- Bisporella monilifera (Fuckel) Sacc. (1884)

Synonyms
- Bispora Fuckel (1870); Calycella Quél. (1886)

= Bisporella =

Genus of fungi

Bisporella is a genus of fungi in the family Helotiaceae.

== Species ==
As of April 2025, Species Fungorum lists 25 species in the genus.

- Bisporella aesculi Arendh. & R.Sharma (1983)
- Bisporella allantospora Raitv. & M.P.Sharma 1984)
- Bisporella calycellinoides R.Sharma & Korf (1982)
- Bisporella filiformis W.Y.Zhuang & F.Ren (2017)
- Bisporella fuegiana (Speg.) Gamundí (1998)
- Bisporella fuscocincta (Graddon) Dennis (1978)
- Bisporella hubeiensis H.D.Zheng & W.Y.Zhuang (2017)
- Bisporella hypostroma Arendh. & R.Sharma (1983)
- Bisporella iodocyanescens Korf & Bujak. (1985)
- Bisporella macra Svrček (1977)
- Bisporella magnispora W.Y.Zhuang & H.D.Zheng (2017)
- Bisporella maireana (Rehm) R.Galán (1993)
- Bisporella monilifera (Fuckel) Sacc. (1884)
- Bisporella nannfeldtii Svrček (1990)
- Bisporella oritis G.W. Beaton (1978)
- Bisporella pallescens (Pers.) S.E.Carp. & Korf (1974)
- Bisporella polygoni (Velen.) S.E.Carp. (1981)
- Bisporella pteridicola F.Ren & W.Y.Zhuang (2017)
- Bisporella resinicola (Baranyay & A.Funk) S.E. Carp. & Seifert (1987)
- Bisporella rubescens (Saut.) S.E.Carp. (1981)
- Bisporella schusteri Gamundí (1998)
- Bisporella sinica W.Y.Zhuang (2017)
- Bisporella strumosa (Ellis & Everh.) Korf (1974)
- Bisporella subpallida (Rehm) Dennis (1978)
- Bisporella tetraspora (Feltgen) S.E.Carp. (1981)
- Bisporella triseptata (Dennis) S.E.Carp. & Dumont (1978)
