= Chloroscypha =

Scientific classification
- Kingdom: Fungi
- Division: Ascomycota
- Class: Leotiomycetes
- Order: Helotiales
- Family: Helotiaceae
- Genus: Chloroscypha; Seaver

Type species
- Chloroscypha seaveri Rehm ex Seaver

Genus of fungi

Chloroscypha is a genus of fungi in the family Helotiaceae. The genus contains 14 species.
