= Crumenulopsis =

Scientific classification
- Kingdom: Fungi
- Division: Ascomycota
- Class: Leotiomycetes
- Order: Helotiales
- Family: Helotiaceae
- Genus: Crumenulopsis; J.W. Groves

Type species
- Crumenulopsis pinicola (Rebent.) J.W. Groves

Genus of fungi

Crumenulopsis is a genus of fungi in the family Helotiaceae. The genus contains 4 species.
