= Weinmannioscyphus =

Scientific classification
- Kingdom: Fungi
- Division: Ascomycota
- Class: Leotiomycetes
- Order: Helotiales
- Family: Helotiaceae
- Genus: Weinmannioscyphus; Svrcek

Type species
- Weinmannioscyphus messerschmidii (Weinm.) Svrček

Genus of fungi

Weinmannioscyphus is a genus of fungi in the family Helotiaceae. This is a monotypic genus, containing the single species Weinmannioscyphus messerschmidii.
