= Johann Anton Weinmann =

German botanist (1782–1858)

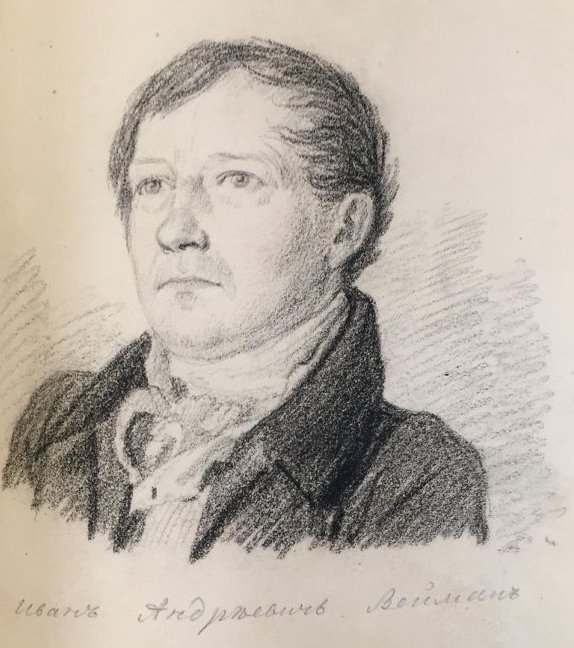
Portrait, 1822

Johann Anton Weinmann (Russian: Иван Андреевич Вейнман, romanized: Ivan Andreyevich Veynman; 23 December 1782, Würzburg – 5 August 1858, Pavlovsk) was a German botanist who served as Inspector of the Gardens in Saint Petersburg, Russia. He published a Flora that is the basis of some binomial species identifications.

Beginning in 1803, he was head gardener of the newly established botanical garden of the Imperial University of Dorpat; from 1823 he served as inspector of the garden of Empress Maria Fyodorovna in Pavlovsk near St. Petersburg.

He also studied fungi (being, for instance, the original author for the name Echinoderma acutesquamosum) and his name is commemorated with the mycological genera Weinmannioscyphus and Weinmannodora, the latter genus being circumscribed by Elias Magnus Fries in 1849.

== Published works ==
- Der botanische Garten der Kaiserlichen Universität zu Dorpat im Jahre 1810. 1810 - The botanical garden of the Imperial University of Dorpat in 1810.
- "Elenchus plantarum horti Imperialis Pawlowsciensis et agri Petropolitani", St. Petersburg 1824.
- "Hymeno- et Gasteromycetes hujusque in imperio Rossico observatas recensuit", St. Petersburg 1836.
- "Enumeratio stirpium in agro Petropolitano sponte crescentium", St. Petersburg 1837.

== Sources ==
- "Вейнман, Иоганн Антон" . Brockhaus and Efron Encyclopedic Dictionary (in Russian). 1906.
