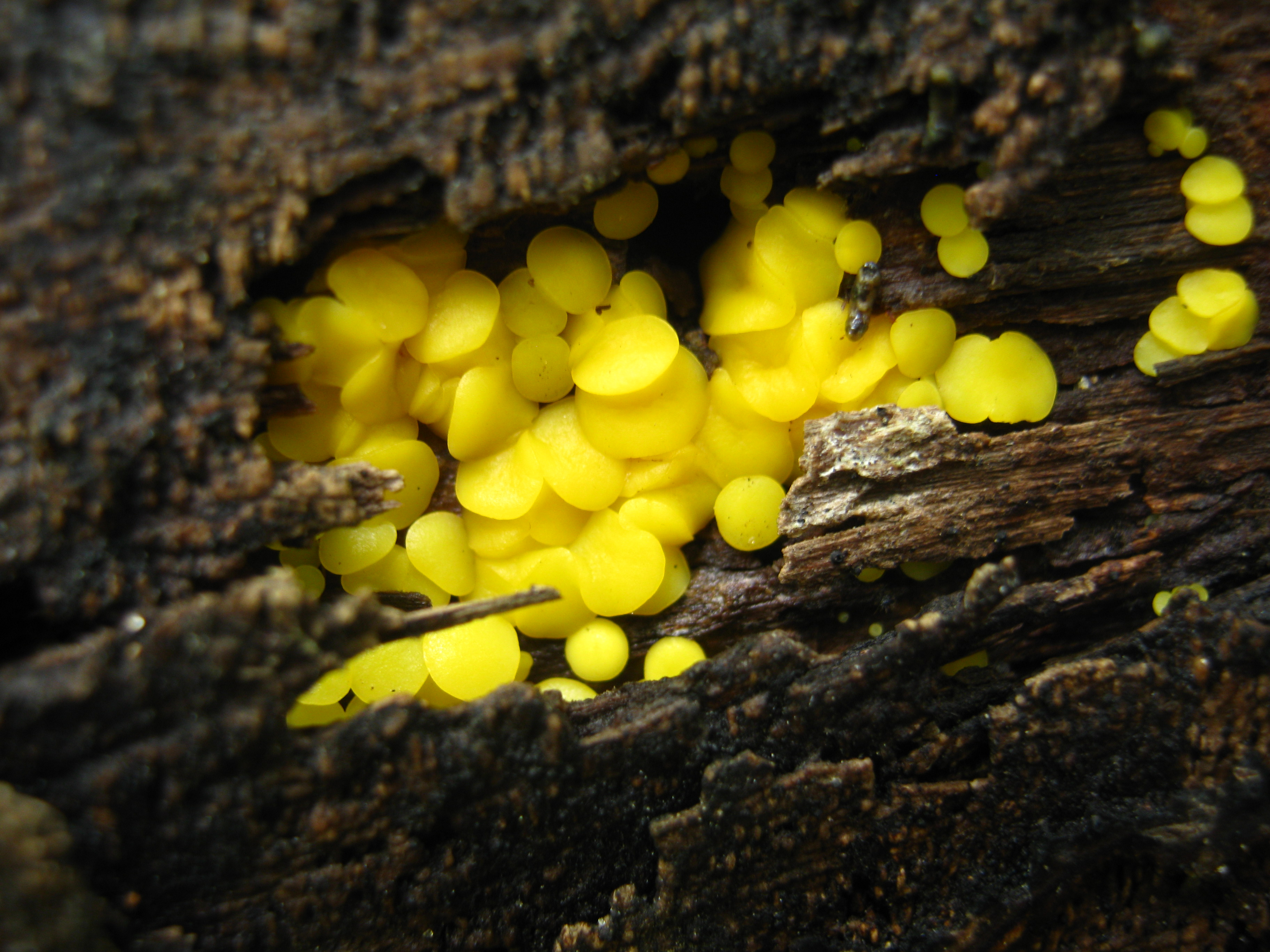
- Bisporella citrina

Scientific classification
- Kingdom: Fungi
- Division: Ascomycota
- Class: Leotiomycetes
- Order: Helotiales
- Family: Helotiaceae; Rehm

Type genus
- Helotium Pers.

= Helotiaceae =

Family of fungi

The Helotiaceae are a family of fungi in the order Helotiales. The distribution of species in the family are widespread, and typically found in tropical areas. There are 117 genera and 826 species in the family.

A question mark after the genus name means that according to the 2007 Outline of Ascomycota, the placement of that genus in this family is uncertain.

== Genera ==
=== A ===
Allophylaria — Ameghiniella — Aquadiscula — Ascocalyx — Ascoclavulina — Ascocoryne — Ascotremella — Austrocenangium

=== B ===
Banksiamyces? — Belonioscyphella — Bioscypha — Bisporella — Bryoscyphus — Bulgariella — Bulgariopsis

=== C ===
Calloriopsis? — Calycellinopsis — Capillipes — Carneopezizella — Cenangiopsis — Cenangium — Cenangiumella — Chloroscypha — Claussenomyces — Cordierites — Crocicreas — Crumenella — Crumenulopsis — Cudoniella

=== D-E ===
Dencoeliopsis — Dictyonia — Discinella — Encoeliopsis — Endoscypha — Episclerotium — Erikssonopsis

=== G ===
Gelatinodiscus — Gelatinopsis? — Gloeopeziza — Godronia — Godroniopsis — Gorgoniceps — Grahamiella — Gremmeniella — Grimmicola — Grovesia — Grovesiella

=== H-O ===
Heterosphaeria — Holmiodiscus — Hymenoscyphus - Hymenotorrendiella — Jacobsonia — Metapezizella — Micraspis — Micropodia? — Mniaecia — Mollisinopsis — Mytilodiscus — Neobulgaria — Neocudoniella — Nipterella — Ombrophila

=== P ===
Pachydisca? — Parencoelia — Parorbiliopsis — Patinellaria — Pestalopezia — Phaeangellina — Phaeofabraea — Phaeohelotium — Physmatomyces? — Pocillum — Poculopsis — Polydiscidium — Pragmopora — Pseudohelotium — Pseudopezicula

=== R-T ===
Rhizocalyx — Sageria — Septopezizella — Skyathea — Stamnaria — Strossmayeria — Symphyosirinia — Tatraea — Thindiomyces — Tympanis

=== U-X ===
Unguiculariopsis — Velutarina — Weinmannioscyphus — Xeromedulla — Xylogramma
