= Bessie B. Kanouse =

American mycologist (1889–1969)

Bessie Bernice Kanouse (born 1889; died February 4, 1969) was an American mycologist. The standard author abbreviation Kanouse is used to indicate this person as the author when citing a botanical name.

== Early life ==
Kanouse was the daughter of Milton D. Kanouse (1856-1934) and Lillie L. Kanouse (1858-1914). She had at least two siblings, Laverne (1892-1895), who died young, and Leon (1894-1980). She graduated from Quincy High School in Quincy, Michigan in 1907 and went on to attend Michigan State Normal School in Ypsilanti. By 1913 she was working as a teacher in Quincy. In 1915 she was working as a laboratory assistant in the natural science department at Michigan State Normal and June 1916 is listed as her expected graduation date.

Kanouse later returned to school and earned an AB at the University of Michigan (1922) and a PhD in biology (1926). Her interest in mycology was evident even in her undergraduate career; in 1920 she presented at the annual American Association for the Advancement of Science meeting in Chicago on "The Life History in Culture of a Homothallic Endogone".

== Career ==
Following her graduation in 1926, Kanouse was appointed a curator of the University of Michigan Herbarium and an assistant to the Director, mycologist C. H. Kauffman. She accompanied Kauffman on several collecting expeditions, including trips to Medicine Bow National Forest in 1923 and to Michigan's Upper Peninsula in the summer of 1927. Kanouse's first substantial contribution to mycology was "A Monographic Study of Special Groups of the Water Molds", published in two parts in the American Journal of Botany (June and July 1927), covering the families Blastocladiaceae, Leptomitaceae, and Pythiomorphaceae.

In 1925, Kanouse won the Jeanne Cady Solis award of University of Michigan.

In 1929 Kanouse was serving as the president of the Women's Research Club at the university.

Kanouse was a charter member of the Mycological Society of America when it formed in 1932. In 1934 Kanouse was serving as the Botany sector chairman for the Michigan Academy of Science, Arts and Letters. and was elected as a Fellow of the American Association for the Advancement of Science.

Kanouse self-published a book of poetry, "Songs to Birchwood", in 1939.

In 1941 Kanouse was one of the founders of the Michigan Botanical Club and was for a short time the first Secretary/Treasurer.

Kanouse published an appreciation of the mycological work of notable gynecologist Howard Atwood Kelly (1858-1943).

Kanouse continued her work at the Herbarium until her retirement in 1960. Her areas of interest included Discomycetes and Phycomycetes, and she published many papers on specimens at the Herbarium, some of which she had collected herself.

== Contributions to taxonomy ==
Kanouse is credited with describing the following:

Orders: Leptomitales

Genera: Acervus, Gelatinodiscus, Leucovibrissea, Modicella, Pseudociboria

Species: Acervus aurantiacus, Blastocladia gracilis, Blastocladia globosa, Blastocladia tenuis, Cenangium tennesseense, Chlorociboria aeruginascens, Gelatinodiscus flavidus, Humaria stellata, Lachnum palmae, Lambertella belisensis, Leucovibrissea obconica, Pseudociboria umbrina, Psilachnum cassandrae, Psilachnum miniatum, Trichophaea michiganensis, Tryblidaria washingtonensis

== Legacy ==
A genus in Saccardiaceae was named "Kanousea" in 1962 by Augusto Chaves Batista and Raffaele Ciferri in her honor, but the species included have been removed to Johansonia and Microcallis. The species Octospora kanouseae in the family Pyronemataceae was named in her honor in 1966 by V. P. Tewari and D. C. Pant. The agaric mushroom species Hebeloma kanouseae was named in her honor by mycologist Alexander H. Smith in 1983.

Kanouse is buried in Lake View Cemetery in Quincy, Michigan, with her father, mother, and infant sister.
