= Arachnopeziza estonica =

Scientific classification
- Kingdom: Fungi
- Division: Ascomycota
- Class: Leotiomycetes
- Order: Helotiales
- Family: Arachnopezizaceae
- Genus: Arachnopeziza
- Species: A. estonica

Binomial name
- Arachnopeziza estonica T. Kosonen, Huhtinen & K. Hansen, 2020

Species of fungus

Arachnopeziza estonica is a species of fungus belonging to the family Arachnopezizaceae.

The species was found in 2020 in Estonia.
