= Erinella =

Erinella may refer to:

- Erinella (bryozoan), a fossil genus of bryozoans in the family Cellariidae
- Erinella (fungus), a genus of funguses in the family Hyaloscyphaceae
- Erinella, a genus of funguses in the family Lachnaceae, synonym of Lachnum
