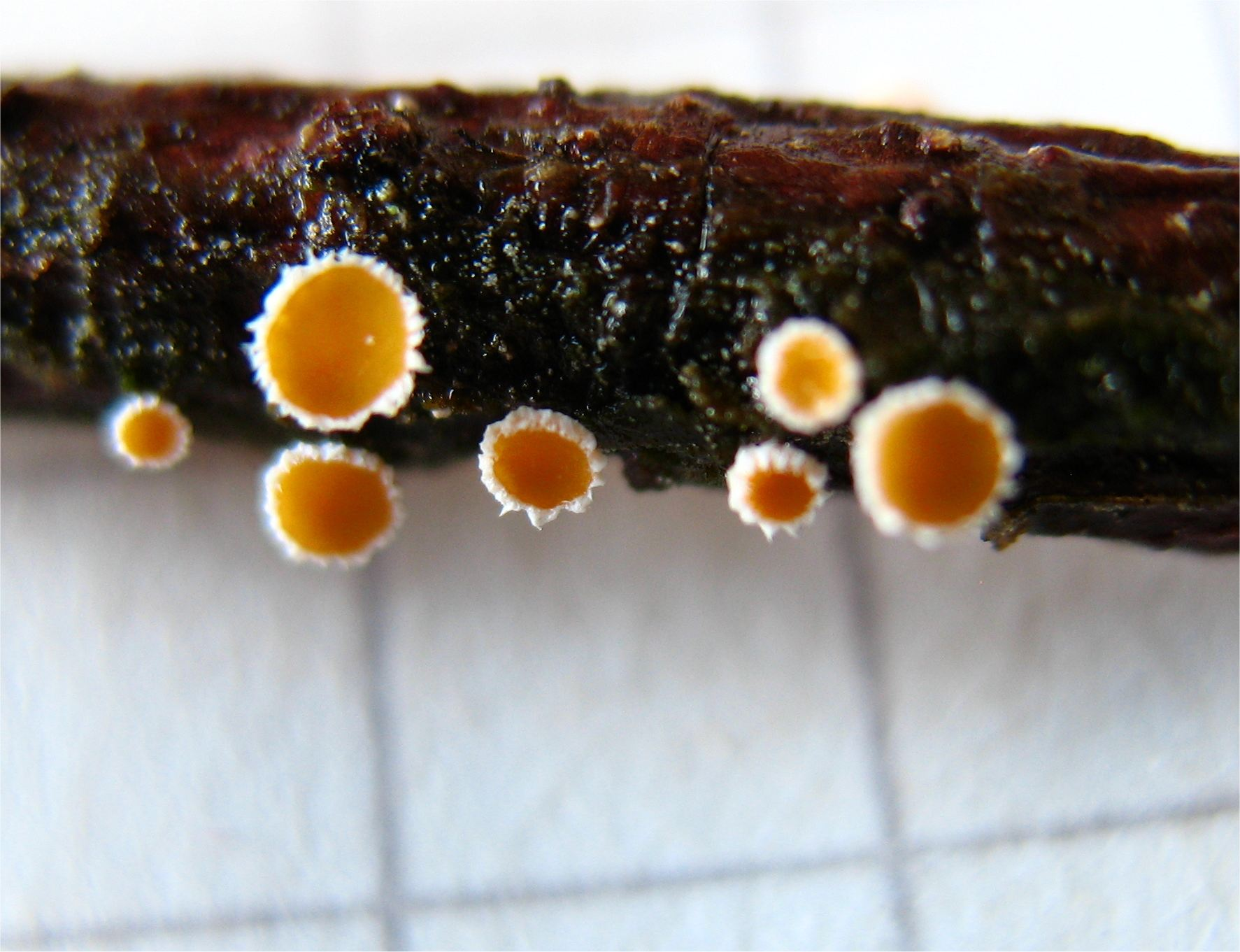

Scientific classification
- Kingdom: Fungi
- Division: Ascomycota
- Class: Leotiomycetes
- Order: Helotiales
- Family: Hyaloscyphaceae; Nannf. (1932)

Type genus
- Hyaloscypha Boud.

= Hyaloscyphaceae =

Family of fungi

The Hyaloscyphaceae are a family of fungi in the Helotiales order. Species in this family have a cosmopolitan distribution, and are saprobic, growing on dead wood and other plant matter.

== Genera ==
According to the 2007 Outline of Ascomycota, the following genera are in the family Hyaloscyphaceae.

- Aeruginoscyphus Dougoud (1)
- Ambrodiscus S.E.Carpenter, 1988 (1)
- Arbusculina Marvanová & Descals (2)
- Betulina (2)
- Calyptellopsis Svrček (1)
- Chrysothallus Velen (14)
- Ciliosculum Kirschstein, 1941 (1)
- Cistella Quél., 1886 (49)
- Clavidisculum Kirschst. (8)
- Dematioscypha Svrček (7)
- Didonia Velen. (7)
- Dimorphotricha B.M.Spooner, 1987 (1)
- Echinula Graddon (1)
- Fuscolachnum J.H.Haines (7)
- Graddonidiscus Raitv. & R.Galán (3)
- Hegermila Raitviir, 1995 (4)
- Hyalopeziza Fuckel (25)
- Hyaloscypha Boud. (100+)
- Incrupila Raitv. (12)
- Olla Velen (10)
- Otwaya G.Beaton, 1978 (1)
- Pilatia Velen. (4)
- Polaroscyphus Huhtinen, 1987 (1)
- Polydesmia Boud. (6)
- Proprioscypha Spooner (2)
- Protounguicularia Raitv. & R.Galán (8)
- Psilocistella Svrček, 1977 (12)
- Pubigera Baral, Gminder & Svrček (1)
- Unguicularia Höhn. (12)
- Unguiculariella K.S.Thind & R.Sharma, 1990 (1)
- Unguiculella Höhn. (14)
- Urceolella Boud. (44)

Figures in brackets are approx. how many species per family.

Former genera; as accepted by Species Fungorum (2022);

- Amicodisca now in Amicodiscaceae family
- Antinoa now in Pezizellaceae family
- Arachnopeziza now in Arachnopezizaceae family
- Asperopilum now in Lachnaceae family
- Austropezia now in Pezizellaceae
- Brunnipila now in Lachnaceae
- Bryoglossum now in Bryoglossaceae family
- Calycellina now in Pezizellaceae
- Calycina now in Pezizellaceae (as well as others)
- Capitotricha now in Lachnaceae
- Ciliolarina now in Hamatocanthoscyphaceae family
- Cistellina now in Hyphodiscaceae family
- Dasyscyphella now in Lachnaceae
- Eriopezianow in Arachnopezizaceae
- Hamatocanthoscypha now in Hamatocanthoscyphaceae
- Hyalacrotes now in Calloriaceae family
- Hydrocina now in Hydrocinaceae family
- Hyphodiscus now in Hyphodiscaceae family
- Incrucipulum now in Lachnaceae
- Lachnaster now in Lachnaceae
- Lachnellula now in Lachnaceae
- Lachnum (synonymous with Dasyscyphus and Belonidium) now in Lachnaceae
- Lasiobelonium now in Solenopeziaceae
- Microscypha now in Hamatocanthoscyphaceae
- Mollisina now in Pezizellaceae
- Neodasyscypha now in Lachnaceae
- Parachnopeziza now in Arachnopezizaceae
- Phaeoscypha now in Pezizellaceae
- Perrotia now in Lachnaceae (and others)
- Pithyella now in Helotiaceae (and others)
- Proliferodiscus now in Lachnaceae
- Psilachnum now in Pezizellaceae
- Rodwayella now in Pezizellaceae
- Solenopezia now in Solenopeziaceae
- Tapesina now in Pezizellaceae
- Trichopeziza now in Lachnaceae (and many others)
- Velutaria now in Pezizellaceae
- Venturiocistella now in Hyphodiscaceae
