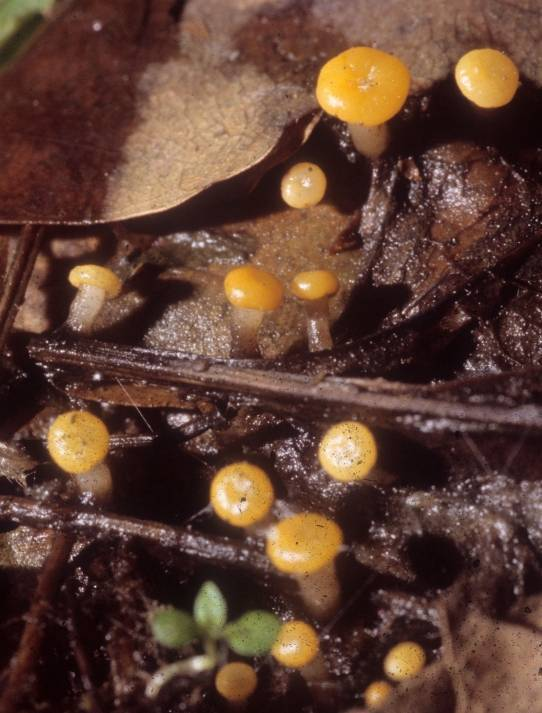

Conservation status
- Secure (NatureServe)

Scientific classification
- Kingdom: Fungi
- Division: Ascomycota
- Class: Leotiomycetes
- Order: Helotiales
- Family: Vibrisseaceae
- Genus: Vibrissea
- Species: V. truncorum

Binomial name
- Vibrissea truncorum Albertini & Schweinitz (1822)

= Vibrissea truncorum =

Species of fungus

Vibrissea truncorum, the water club mushroom or aquatic earth-tongue, is a species of fungus in the family Vibrisseaceae. It is found throughout the Northern Hemisphere.

== Description ==
Water club mushroom is a fungus that grows up to about 2 centimetres (3/4 inch) tall, with a cap 0.3–0.5 cm (1/8–1/4 in) wide. It is characterized by its yellow, orange, or reddish fruiting body, and white to bluish-gray stem, darkening to brown at the base.

=== Similar species ===
The heads of Leotia and Cudonia species are less yellow, while Vibrissea species can lack stems.

== Distribution and habitat ==
Vibrissea truncorum is a cosmopolitan mushroom, found throughout the Northern Hemisphere, including North America (in the Pacific Northwest and the Atlantic Northeast), Europe, Japan, and rarely in eastern Russia and Chile. It is most heavily concentrated in Norway, Sweden, Finland, and Western Russia, though it appears also in the United Kingdom and Southwestern Europe.

Water club mushroom often grows on partially or completely submerged wood in streams at higher elevations.
