= Belonidium =

Belonidium may refer to:

- Belonidium Ehrenberg, 1854, fossil genus of Chromista, Bacillariophyceae
- Belonidium Durieu de Maisonneuve, 1848, synonym of Lachnum Retzius, 1795, genus of fungi
- Belonidium (gastropod) Cossmann, 1892, a genus of gastropods; see Eulimella
