= Diplococcium asperum =

Scientific classification
- Kingdom: Fungi
- Division: Ascomycota
- Class: Leotiomycetes
- Order: Helotiales
- Family: Vibrisseaceae
- Genus: Diplococcium
- Species: D. asperum

Binomial name
- Diplococcium asperum Goh, K.D. Hyde & Umali

Species of fungus

Diplococcium asperum is a species of fungus belonging to the family Vibrisseaceae.

== Description ==
This species has verrucose and uniseptate condia with smooth walls.

== Habitat ==
This species has a habitat of rotten palm rachides.
