= Fuscoscypha =

Scientific classification
- Kingdom: Fungi
- Division: Ascomycota
- Class: Leotiomycetes
- Order: Helotiales
- Family: Hyaloscyphaceae
- Genus: Fuscoscypha; Svrček

Type species
- Fuscoscypha acicularum (Velen.) Svrček

Genus of fungi

Fuscoscypha is a genus of fungi within the Hyaloscyphaceae family. This is a monotypic genus, containing the single species Fuscoscypha acicularum.
