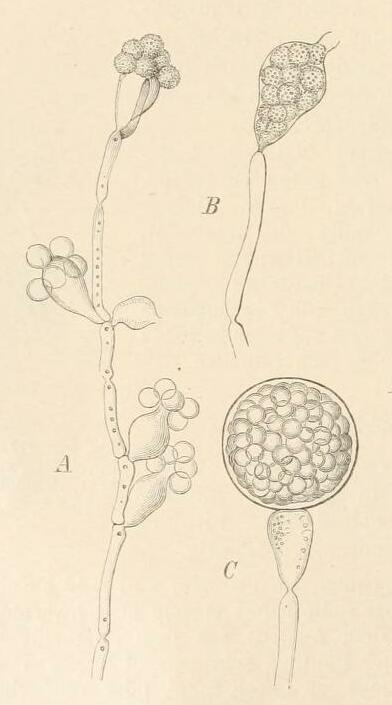
- Apodachlya pirifera

Scientific classification
- Domain: Eukaryota
- Clade: Sar
- Clade: Stramenopiles
- Phylum: Oomycota
- Class: Saprolegniomycetes
- Order: Leptomitales
- Family: Leptomitaceae
- Genus: Apodachlya; Pringsh 1888

Species
- Apodachlya brachynema Apodachlya minima Apodachlya punctata Apodachlya pyrifera

= Apodachlya =

Genus of single-celled organisms

Apodachlya is a genus of water mold within the order Leptomitales.

== Physical characteristics ==
Apodachlya are characterized by the structure of their hyphae, which are constricted into septae-like structures which enclose cellulin plugs, preventing the loss of cytoplasm in the case of cell rupture. They reproduce asexually in the water. Zoospores encyst at the tip in a manner similar to the genus Achlya.
