= Leucovibrissea =

Scientific classification
- Kingdom: Fungi
- Division: Ascomycota
- Class: Leotiomycetes
- Order: Helotiales
- Family: Vibrisseaceae
- Genus: Leucovibrissea (A.Sánchez) Korf (1990)

Type species
- Leucovibrissea obconica (Kanouse) Korf 1990

Genus of fungi

Leucovibrissea is a genus of fungi in the family Vibrisseaceae. The genus is monotypic, containing the single species Leucovibrissea obconica, found in the United States.
