= Diplococcium atrovelutinum =

Scientific classification
- Kingdom: Fungi
- Division: Ascomycota
- Class: Leotiomycetes
- Order: Helotiales
- Family: Vibrisseaceae
- Genus: Diplococcium
- Species: D. atrovelutinum

Binomial name
- Diplococcium atrovelutinum Goh, K.D. Hyde & Umali

Species of fungus

Diplococcium atrovelutinum is a species of fungus belonging to the family Vibrisseaceae.

== Distribution ==
This species has been located in Kerala, India.
