= Richard P. Korf =

American mycologist

Richard Paul Korf
- Born: May 28, 1925
- Died: August 20, 2016 (aged 91); Ithaca, New York
- Citizenship: United States
- Education: Riverdale Country School; Cornell University
- Known for: Founding co-editor of the journal Mycotaxon
- Scientific career
- Fields: Mycology
- Patrons: Herbert Hice Whetzel; Harry Morton Fitzpatrick

Richard Paul Korf (May 28, 1925 – August 20, 2016) was an American mycologist and founding co-editor of the journal Mycotaxon. He was a preeminent figure in the study of discomycetes and made significant contributions to the field of fungal nomenclature and taxonomy. Korf was professor emeritus of mycology at Cornell University and director emeritus of Cornell University's Plant Pathology Herbarium.

== Early life and education ==
Korf was born on May 28, 1925, to an upper-middle-class family with homes in Westchester County, New York, and New Fairfield, Connecticut. While attending the prestigious Riverdale Country School in New York City, Korf was placed in charge of his biology class after their teacher joined the military. "In retrospect," Korf wrote, "I am convinced that this experience had an enormous impact on my future and on my decision to enter the teaching profession."

In 1942, shortly after his 17th birthday, Korf enrolled at Cornell University "with the vague notion that [he] might like to become a gentleman farmer." At the suggestion of botany professor Loren C. Petry, Korf began studying plant pathology under Herbert Hice Whetzel. Korf continued his training under mycologist Harry Morton Fitzpatrick, whom he nicknamed "Prof Fitz." Korf completed his B.S. in botany in 1946 and doctorate in plant pathology and mycology with minors in genetics and general botany in 1950.

== Contributions to mycology ==
=== Professorship ===
Following the completion of his doctorate, Korf spent a year teaching mycology at the University of Glasgow in Scotland. He returned to Cornell in 1951 as a faculty member in the Department of Plant Pathology. He was named Associate Professor in 1955 and Professor of Mycology in 1961. He retired in 1992 but continued to teach until 1998, when he was replaced by Kathie Hodge. Korf trained and advised 27 PhD students, including Lekh Raj Batra, William C. Denison, K. P. Dumont, James Kimbrough, Donald H. Pfister, Martin A. Rosinski, Robert L. Shaffer, Robert A. Shoemaker, and Wenying Zhuang.

=== Herbarium ===
Korf was director emeritus of the Cornell University Plant Pathology Herbarium (CUP), one of the largest fungal herbariums in the United States. Korf traveled globally over the course of his career, collecting fungi in Belgium, Denmark, Dominican Republic, Finland, France, Hungary, Indonesia, Jamaica, Japan, Macaronesia, New Zealand, Norway, Philippines, Portugal, Puerto Rico, Scotland, Singapore, Sweden, and Taiwan. The Richard P. Korf Herbarium within CUP boasts nearly 5000 specimens, including 257 type specimens. This collection is dominated by taxa of particular interest to Korf: Arachnopeziza, Calycella (now Bisporella), Cheilymenia, Chlorosplenium, Dasyscyphus, Hyaloscypha, Hymenoscyphus, Mollisia, Orbiliaceae, Peziza, Rutstroemia, Scutellinia, and Trichophaea.

=== Mycotaxon ===
Korf co-founded Mycotaxon, an international peer-reviewed journal of taxonomy and nomenclature of fungi and lichens, with co-worker Grégoire L. Hennebert in 1974. Korf oversaw journal preparation, final editing, and subscription management as Managing Editor & English Language Editor (1974-1991) and business manager (1991–2006). He served as Assistant to the Editor-in-Chief from 1998 to 2003 and as treasurer of the corporation from 1999 to his death in 2016.

Mycotaxon reached 131 published volumes in 2016.

=== Taxa described ===
Korf described or reclassified hundreds of species of fungi. The standard author abbreviation Korf is applied to taxa he described.

== Personal life ==
While on sabbatical in Japan in 1957, Korf met his wife Kumiko "Kumi" Tachibana, a fine artist specializing in printmaking. Her younger sister was a student in his English conversation group at Yokohama National University. They married and had four children together: Noni, Mia, Ian, and Mario.

In the 1960s, Korf chaired the Liberal Party of Tompkins County, New York.

In 1972, Korf purchased Exe Island on Big Rideau Lake in Portland, Ontario, Canada. He later transferred the three acre island with cottage to Mycotaxon, Ltd. as Exe Island Biological Station.

Korf enjoyed the card game Crazy Eights, and is remembered for organizing tournaments at mycological conferences and during holidays on Exe Island.

Korf died on August 20, 2016, at the age of 91 at home in Ithaca, New York.

== Thespian activity ==
Korf was an active thespian with a lifelong enthusiasm for theatre arts. Performing in plays since childhood, he acted on Cornell and Ithaca stages and in the recording studio. Korf performed under the pseudonym "Jonah Webster" as a student to hide his "favorite avocation" from professor Harry Morton Fitzpatrick, who disapproved of non-mycological pursuits. Korf served part-time as chair of Cornell's Department of Theatre Arts from 1985 to 1986.

== Honors, awards, and memberships ==
In November 2015, the journal Ascomycete.org published a Jubilee tribute issue in honor of Korf's 90th birthday.

=== Eponymous taxa ===
- Anthracobia korfii S. Ahmad 1978
- Chlorencoelia ripakorfii Iturr & Mardones 2013
- Cookeina korfii Iturr., Xu, F & Pfister 2015
- Discina korfii Raitv. 1970
- Geopyxis korfii W.Y. Zhuang 2006
- Gyromitra korfii (Raitv.) Harmaja 1973
- Korfia J. Reid & Cain 1963
- Korfiella D.C. Pant & V.P. Tewari 1970
- Korfiomyces Iturr. & D. Hawksw. 2004
- Lambertella korfii W.Y. Zhuang 1990
- Naemacyclus korfii V.G. Rao, Ullasa & A.S. Patil 1972
- Phoma korfii Boerema & Gruyter 1999
- Phylacia korfii J. Fourn. & Lechat 2015
- Protocreopsis korfii Lechat C. & Fournier J. 2016
- Sarcoscypha korfiana F.A. Harr. 1997
- Scutellinia korfiana W.Y. Zhuang 2005
- Scutellinia korfii Le Gal 1969
- Stictus korfii Sherwood 1977
- Strossmayeria dickorfii Iturr.1990

=== Honors and awards ===
- 2010, Ainsworth Medal for extraordinary service to international mycology, International Mycological Congress
- 1996, British Mycological Society Centenary Fellow
- 1993, Gamma Sigma Delta Cornell Chapter 1992 Distinguished Teaching Award
- 1992, State University of New York Chancellor's Award for Excellence in Teaching
- 1991, Distinguished Mycologist Award, Mycological Society of America
- 1972–73, Fulbright Senior Research Scholar, Université Catholique de Louvain
- 1957–58, John Simon Guggenheim Memorial Foundation Fellow (declined)
- 1957–58, National Science Foundation Senior Postdoctoral Fellow, Yokohama National University

=== Memberships ===
- Mycological Society of America
- British Mycological Society
- Société Mycologique de France
- Mycological Society of Japan
- International Association for Plant Taxonomy

== Publications ==
Korf was a prolific author, having published over 400 papers, many in his journal Mycotaxon. The following list comprises his publications made in his last ten years of writing. A complete list is on the Mycotaxon website.

- Korf, R.P. 2011. Henry Dissing: a reminiscence. Asocomycete.org 2(4): 7–8.
- Korf, R. P. & L. L. Norvell. 2011. Cautionary advice to authors who alter their reprints in any way from the original publication. Mycotaxon 114: 485. [2010]
- Korf, R.P., J. W. Lorbeer & W. A. Sinclair. 2010. George Clarence Kent. Memorial Statements, Cornell University Faculty 2008–2009. Office of the Dean of Faculty, Ithaca, New York: 35-37
- Korf, R.P. 2009d. Can we really afford an International Code of Mycological Nomenclature? Mycotaxon 110: 505–507.
- Korf, R. P. 2009c. Naming Nature: the Clash Between Instinct and Science, by Carol Kaesuk Yoon. Inoculum [suppl. to Mycologia] 60(6): 9-10.
- Korf, R. P. 2009b. [Letter, 1 August 2008], pp. 117–118 in S. Knapp & Q. Wheeler [eds.], Letters to Linnaeus. London: The Linnean Society, 324 pp.
- Wong, G. J. & R. P. Korf. 2009. Currently known and reported Discomycetes (Ascomycota) of Hawai'i. Pacific Sci. 61: 449–456.
- Korf, R. P. 2009a. Indian sarcoscyphaceous fungi, by D. C. Pant and Vindeshwari Prasad. Mycotaxon 107: 511–512.
- Korf, R. P. & R. Dirig. 2009. Discomycetes Exsiccati - Fascicles 5 and 6. Mycotaxon 107: 25–34.
- Korf, R. P. 2008. Nomenclatural notes. 12. Untangling Hedwig's Octospora villosa: Helvella fibrosa comb. nov. Mycotaxon 103: 307–312.
- Abawi, G. S., G. W. Hudler, & R. P. Korf. 2007. In Memoriam William F. Mai 1916–2007. J.Nematol. 39:211-212.
- Korf, R. P. 2007d. Fungi of the protected landscape area of Vihorlat, by Sona Ripova, Slavomir Adamcik, Viktor Kucera, and Ladislav Palko. Mycotaxon 102: 437–438.
- Korf, R. P. 2007c. MycoKey 2.1, by Thomas Laessoe and Jens H. Petersen. Mycotaxon 102: 434–435.
- Korf, R. P. 2007b. On the genus Solenopezia (Fungi: Lachnaceae) and ICBN Art. 58-a sleeping dog bites back. Bol. Soc. Argent. Bot. 43: 29–32.
- Korf, R. P. 2007a. A tribute to Grégoire Laurent Hennebert and Mycotaxon's 100th volume. Mycotaxon 100: 1–4.
- Korf, R. P. 2005. Reinventing taxonomy: a curmudgeon's view of 250 years of fungal taxonomy, the crisis in biodiversity, and the pitfalls of the phylogenetic age. Mycotaxon 93: 407–415.
- Hodge, K. T., W. Gams, R. A. Samson, R. P. Korf, & K. A. Seifert. 2005. Lectotypification and status of Isaria Pers. : Fr. Taxon 54: 485–489.
- Gams, W., K. T. Hodge, R. A. Samson, R. P. Korf, & K. A. Seifert. 2005, (1684) Proposal to conserve the name Isaria (anamorphic fungi) with a conserved type. Taxon 54: 537.
- Gams, W, R. P. Korf, J. I. Pitt, D. L. Hawksworth, M. L. Berbee, & P. M. Kirk, edited by K. A. Seifert. 2003. Has dual nomenclature for fungi run its course? The Article 59 debate. Mycotaxon 88: 493–508.
- Korf, R. P. 2003. Mycotaxon gets a face-lift. Inoculum [suppl. to Mycologia] 56(6): 7.
- Lizon, P. & R. P. Korf. 2003. Editorial changes coming for Mycotaxon. Mycotaxon 86: 529-530
- Korf, R. P. 2002b. S. C. Teng, a Fitzpatrick student, a model taxonomist. Mycosystema 21: 473-474
- Korf, R. P. 2002a. Ainsworth & Bisby's Dictionary of the Fungi, by Paul M. Kirk, Paul F. Cannon, John C. David & Joost A. Stalpers, ed. 9. Mycotaxon 82: 475.
- Korf, R. P. 2001c. A cautionary tale: on publishing, pirating, copyright infringement, and slander. Inoculum [suppl. to Mycologia] 52(4): 26.
- Korf, R. P. 2001b. Molecules, Morphology and Classification: Towards monophyletic genera in the ascomycetes, edited by Keith A. Seifert, Walter Gams, Pedro W. Crous, and Gary J. Samuels. Mycotaxon 77: 499–500.
- Korf, R. P. 2001a. Amphithallic; Aneuploid; Apothecium; Ascocarp; Ascoconidium; Ascomycete; Ascospore;Ascus; Binucleate; Bulbil; Clamp Connection; Cleistothecium; Coenocytic; Dikaryotic; Diploid; Fungus; Haploid; Haustorium; Heterokaryosis;Heterothallic; Homokaryosis; Homothallic; Hypha; Hyphopodium; Hysterothecium; Mating Incompatibility; Mating Type; Microsclerotium; Monokaryotic; Multinucleate; Mycelial Fan; Mycelial Mat; Mycelium; Mycology; Nuclear Condition; Parasexual Cycle; Perithecium; Polyploid; Pseudohomothallic; Pseudothecium; Rhizomorph; Runner Hyphae; Sclerotium; Septate, in O. C. Maloy & T. D. Murray [eds.], Encyclopedia of Plant Pathology. 2 vols. New York: John Wiley & Sons.
- Korf, R. P. & P. Lizon. 2001. The status of the ordinal name Leotiales. Czech Mycol. 52: 255–257.(2000.)

In 1954, Korf issued the exsiccata Discomycetes Exsiccati. He later continued the edition with S.C. Gruff and R. Dirig.

== See also ==
- Category:Taxa named by Richard P. Korf
