= Diplococcium bicolor =

Scientific classification
- Kingdom: Fungi
- Division: Ascomycota
- Class: Leotiomycetes
- Order: Helotiales
- Family: Vibrisseaceae
- Genus: Diplococcium
- Species: D. bicolor

Binomial name
- Diplococcium bicolor Goh, K.D. Hyde & Umali

Species of fungus

Diplococcium bicolor is a species of fungus belonging to the family Vibrisseaceae.

== Description ==
This species has langeniform to obclavate condia. They aggregate in whorls around the condiogenous cells.

This species is 11-20 by 4-5.5 micrometers in size.

== Distribution ==
This species has been observed in Czechoslovakia.
