= Chlorovibrissea chilensis =

Conservation status
- Endangered (IUCN 3.1)

Scientific classification
- Kingdom: Fungi
- Division: Ascomycota
- Class: Leotiomycetes
- Order: Helotiales
- Family: Vibrisseaceae
- Genus: Chlorovibrissea
- Species: C. chilensis

Binomial name
- Chlorovibrissea chilensis Sand.-Leiva, A.I.Romero & P.R.Johnst.

Species of fungus

Chlorovibrissea chilensis is a species of fungus in the order Helotiales, native to Chile.

== Taxonomy ==
The species was first described by Pablo Sandoval Leiva, Andrea Irene Romero & Peter R. Jonhston in 2014, based on specimens from Puerto Aysén, Chile. The holotype is deposited in Chilean National Museum of Natural History, under the catalog number SGO 163165.
