= Diplococcium aquaticum =

Scientific classification
- Kingdom: Fungi
- Division: Ascomycota
- Class: Leotiomycetes
- Order: Helotiales
- Family: Vibrisseaceae
- Genus: Diplococcium
- Species: D. aquaticum

Binomial name
- Diplococcium aquaticum Goh, K.D. Hyde & Umali

Species of fungus

Diplococcium aquaticum is a species of fungus belonging to the family Vibrisseaceae.

== Description ==
This species has slender condiophores and pyriform condia.

== Distribution ==
This species has been observed in Australia. Its habitat is submerged wood.
