= Unguiculariella =

Scientific classification
- Kingdom: Fungi
- Division: Ascomycota
- Class: Leotiomycetes
- Order: Helotiales
- Family: Hyaloscyphaceae
- Genus: Unguiculariella; K.S. Thind & R. Sharma

Type species
- Unguiculariella bhutanica K.S. Thind & R. Sharma

Genus of fungi

Unguiculariella is a genus of fungi within the Hyaloscyphaceae family. This is a monotypic genus, containing the single species Unguiculariella bhutanica.
