= Erinella (fungus) =

Scientific classification
- Kingdom: Fungi
- Division: Ascomycota
- Class: Leotiomycetes
- Order: Helotiales
- Family: Hyaloscyphaceae
- Genus: Erinella; Quél.

Genus of fungi

Erinella is a genus of fungi belonging to the family Hyaloscyphaceae.

== Species ==
Species:

- Erinella aspidiicola
- Erinella callimorpha
- Erinella calyculiformis
