= Dematioscypha =

Scientific classification
- Kingdom: Fungi
- Division: Ascomycota
- Class: Leotiomycetes
- Order: Helotiales
- Family: Hyaloscyphaceae
- Genus: Dematioscypha; Svrček

Type species
- Dematioscypha dematiicola (Berk. & Broome) Svrček

Genus of fungi

Dematioscypha is a genus of fungi within the Hyaloscyphaceae family. The genus contains 3 species.
