= Dimorphotricha =

Scientific classification
- Kingdom: Fungi
- Division: Ascomycota
- Class: Leotiomycetes
- Order: Helotiales
- Family: Hyaloscyphaceae
- Genus: Dimorphotricha; Spooner

Type species
- Dimorphotricha australis Spooner

Genus of fungi

Dimorphotricha is a genus of fungi within the Hyaloscyphaceae family. This is a monotypic genus, containing the single species Dimorphotricha australis.
