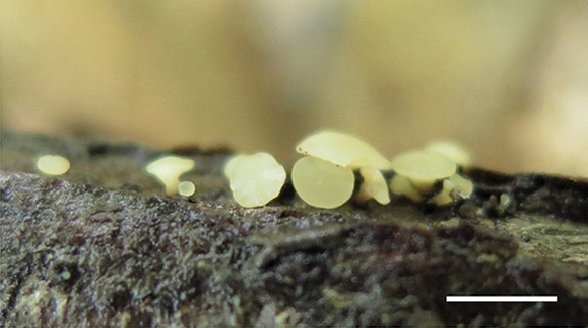
- Chlorovibrissea korfii in Yunnan province, China

Scientific classification
- Kingdom: Fungi
- Division: Ascomycota
- Class: Leotiomycetes
- Order: Helotiales
- Family: Vibrisseaceae
- Genus: Chlorovibrissea; L.M.Kohn

Type species
- Chlorovibrissea bicolor (G.W.Beaton & Weste) L.M.Kohn

= Chlorovibrissea =

Genus of fungi

Chlorovibrissea is a genus of aquatic or semi-aquatic fungi in the family Vibrisseaceae. Most species are found in Australasia but C. chilensis, described as new to science in 2014, is from South America and C. korfii is from China.

These seven species are assigned to the genus:

- Chlorovibrissea albofusca (G.W. Beaton) Sand.-Leiva, A.I. Romero & P.R. Johnst.
- Chlorovibrissea bicolor (G.W. Beaton & Weste) L.M. Kohn
- Chlorovibrissea chilensis Sand.-Leiva, A.I. Romero & P.R. Johnst.
- Chlorovibrissea korfii H.D. Zheng & W.Y. Zhuang
- Chlorovibrissea melanochlora (G.W. Beaton & Weste) L.M. Kohn
- Chlorovibrissea phialophora Samuels & L.M. Kohn
- Chlorovibrissea tasmanica (Rodway) L.M. Kohn
