= Lasiobelonium =

Scientific classification
- Kingdom: Fungi
- Division: Ascomycota
- Class: Leotiomycetes
- Order: Helotiales
- Family: Hyaloscyphaceae
- Genus: Lasiobelonium; Ellis & Everh.

Genus of fungi

Lasiobelonium is a genus of fungi within the Hyaloscyphaceae family. The genus contains about 20 species.
