= Mollisina =

Scientific classification
- Kingdom: Fungi
- Division: Ascomycota
- Class: Leotiomycetes
- Order: Helotiales
- Family: Hyaloscyphaceae
- Genus: Mollisina; Höhn. ex Weese

Type species
- Mollisina rubi (Rehm) Höhn.

Genus of fungi

Mollisina is a genus of fungi within the Hyaloscyphaceae family. The genus contains 11 species.
