= Calycellina =

Scientific classification
- Kingdom: Fungi
- Division: Ascomycota
- Class: Leotiomycetes
- Order: Helotiales
- Family: Hyaloscyphaceae
- Genus: Calycellina; Höhn (1918)

Type species
- Calycellina punctiformis (Grev.) Höhn. (1926)

Synonyms
- Phialina Höhn. (1926); Phialoscypha Raitv. (1977); Scutoscypha Graddon (1980); Setoscypha Velen. (1934)

Genus of fungi

Calycellina is a genus of fungi in the family Hyaloscyphaceae. The genus contains about 43 species.

== Species ==
- Calycellina albida
- Calycellina angulata
- Calycellina asperipila
- Calycellina calycelloides
- Calycellina camelliae
- Calycellina caricina
- Calycellina carolinensis
- Calycellina chalarae
- Calycellina chlorinella
- Calycellina dennisii
- Calycellina ericae
- Calycellina fagina
- Calycellina guttulifera
- Calycellina hygrophila
- Calycellina ilicis
- Calycellina indumenticola
- Calycellina juniperina
- Calycellina lauri
- Calycellina leucella
- Calycellina lunispora
- Calycellina lutea
- Calycellina luzulae
- Calycellina lycopodii
- Calycellina microspis
- Calycellina montana
- Calycellina myriadea
- Calycellina nemorosa
- Calycellina nigrostipitata
- Calycellina obscura
- Calycellina ochracea
- Calycellina operta
- Calycellina osmundae
- Calycellina phalaridis
- Calycellina populina
- Calycellina praetermissa
- Calycellina pulviscula
- Calycellina punctata
- Calycellina rivelinensis
- Calycellina rosae
- Calycellina rubescens
- Calycellina sadleriae
- Calycellina sorido-pulvinata
- Calycellina spiraeae
- Calycellina thindii
- Calycellina viridiflavescens
