= Rodwayella =

Scientific classification
- Kingdom: Fungi
- Division: Ascomycota
- Class: Leotiomycetes
- Order: Helotiales
- Family: Hyaloscyphaceae
- Genus: Rodwayella; Spooner

Type species
- Helotium sessile Rodway

Genus of fungi

Rodwayella is a genus of fungi within the Hyaloscyphaceae family. The genus contains four species.

It is named in honour of the botanist and dentist Leonard Rodway (1853–1936), who had described the type species for the genus.
