= Cistella (fungus) =

Scientific classification
- Kingdom: Fungi
- Division: Ascomycota
- Class: Leotiomycetes
- Order: Helotiales
- Family: Hyaloscyphaceae
- Genus: Cistella; Quél.

Type species
- Cistella dentata (Pers.) Quél.

Genus of fungi

Cistella is a genus of fungi within the Hyaloscyphaceae family. The genus contains 38 species.
