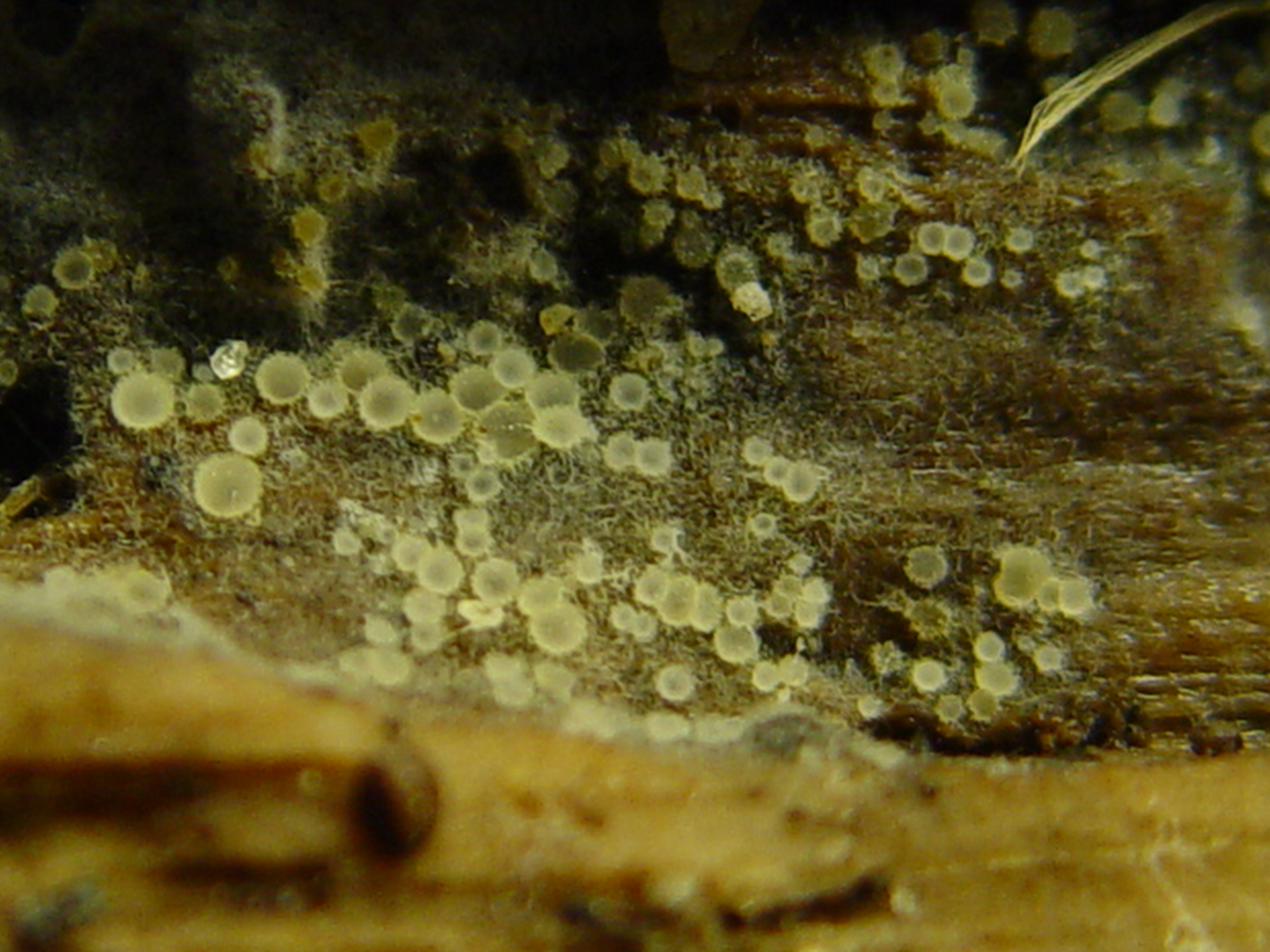
- Arachnopeziza aurata in Braga, Portugal

Scientific classification
- Kingdom: Fungi
- Division: Ascomycota
- Class: Leotiomycetes
- Order: Helotiales
- Family: Arachnopezizaceae

= Arachnopezizaceae =

Family of fungi

Arachnopezizaceae is a family of fungi belonging to the order Helotiales.

Genera:

- Arachnopeziza Fuckel
- Arachnoscypha Boud.
- Austropezia B.M.Spooner, 1987
- Eriopezia (Sacc.) Rehm
