= Brunnipila =

Scientific classification
- Kingdom: Fungi
- Division: Ascomycota
- Class: Leotiomycetes
- Order: Helotiales
- Family: Hyaloscyphaceae
- Genus: Brunnipila; Baral

Type species
- Brunnipila clandestina (Bull.) Baral

Species
- B. calyculiformis B. cannabina B. clandestina B. dryadis B. longipila

Genus of fungi

Brunnipila is a genus of fungi within the Hyaloscyphaceae family.
