= Hyalacrotes =

Scientific classification
- Kingdom: Fungi
- Division: Ascomycota
- Class: Leotiomycetes
- Order: Helotiales
- Family: Hyaloscyphaceae
- Genus: Hyalacrotes (Rehm) Raitv.

Type species
- Hyalacrotes hamulata (Rehm) Raitv.

Genus of fungi

Hyalacrotes is a genus of fungi within the Hyaloscyphaceae family. The genus contains 2 species.
