= Incrucipulum =

Scientific classification
- Kingdom: Fungi
- Division: Ascomycota
- Class: Leotiomycetes
- Order: Helotiales
- Family: Hyaloscyphaceae
- Genus: Incrucipulum; Baral

Type species
- Incrucipulum ciliare (Schrad.) Baral

Genus of fungi

Incrucipulum is a genus of fungi within the Hyaloscyphaceae family. The genus contains 4 species.
