= Psilocistella =

Scientific classification
- Kingdom: Fungi
- Division: Ascomycota
- Class: Leotiomycetes
- Order: Helotiales
- Family: Hyaloscyphaceae
- Genus: Psilocistella; Svrček

Type species
- Psilocistella obsoleta (Velen.) Svrček

Genus of fungi

Psilocistella is a genus of fungi within the Hyaloscyphaceae family. The genus contains ten species.
