= Hyphodiscus =

Scientific classification
- Kingdom: Fungi
- Division: Ascomycota
- Class: Leotiomycetes
- Order: Helotiales
- Family: Hyaloscyphaceae
- Genus: Hyphodiscus; Hyphodiscus gregarius

Type species
- Hyphodiscus gregarius Kirschst.

Genus of fungi

Hyphodiscus is a genus of fungi within the Hyaloscyphaceae family. The genus contains six species.
