= Ciliosculum =

Scientific classification
- Kingdom: Fungi
- Division: Ascomycota
- Class: Leotiomycetes
- Order: Helotiales
- Family: Hyaloscyphaceae
- Genus: Ciliosculum; Kirschst.

Type species
- Ciliosculum invisibile Kirschst.

Genus of fungi

Ciliosculum is a genus of fungi within the Hyaloscyphaceae family. This is a monotypic genus, containing the single species Ciliosculum invisibile.
