= Capitotricha =

Scientific classification
- Kingdom: Fungi
- Division: Ascomycota
- Class: Leotiomycetes
- Order: Helotiales
- Family: Hyaloscyphaceae
- Genus: Capitotricha (Raitv.) Baral

Type species
- Capitotricha bicolor (Bull.) Baral

Genus of fungi

Capitotricha is a genus of fungi within the Hyaloscyphaceae family. The genus contains 3 species.
