= Echinula =

Scientific classification
- Kingdom: Fungi
- Division: Ascomycota
- Class: Leotiomycetes
- Order: Helotiales
- Family: Hyaloscyphaceae
- Genus: Echinula; Graddon

Type species
- Echinula asteriadiformis Graddon

Genus of fungi

Echinula is a genus of fungi within the Hyaloscyphaceae family. Echinula is a monotypic genus, containing a single species called Echinula asteriadiformis.
