= Incrupila =

Scientific classification
- Kingdom: Fungi
- Division: Ascomycota
- Class: Leotiomycetes
- Order: Helotiales
- Family: Hyaloscyphaceae
- Genus: Incrupila; Raitv.

Type species
- Incrupila aspidii (Lib.) Raitv.

Genus of fungi

Incrupila is a genus of fungi within the Hyaloscyphaceae family. The genus contains 10 species.
