= Asperopilum =

Scientific classification
- Kingdom: Fungi
- Division: Ascomycota
- Class: Leotiomycetes
- Order: Helotiales
- Family: Hyaloscyphaceae
- Genus: Asperopilum; Spooner
- Species: A. juncicola

Binomial name
- Asperopilum juncicola (Dennis) Spooner

Genus of fungi

Asperopilum is a genus of fungi within the Hyaloscyphaceae family. This is a monotypic genus, containing the single species Asperopilum juncicola.
