= Microscypha =

Scientific classification
- Kingdom: Fungi
- Division: Ascomycota
- Class: Leotiomycetes
- Order: Helotiales
- Family: Hyaloscyphaceae
- Genus: Microscypha; Syd. & P. Syd.

Type species
- Microscypha grisella (Rehm) Syd. & P. Syd.

Genus of fungi

Microscypha is a genus of fungi within the Hyaloscyphaceae family. The genus contains four species.
