= Tapesina =

Scientific classification
- Kingdom: Fungi
- Division: Ascomycota
- Class: Leotiomycetes
- Order: Helotiales
- Family: Hyaloscyphaceae
- Genus: Tapesina; Lambotte

Type species
- Tapesina griseovitellina (Fuckel) Höhn.

Genus of fungi

Tapesina is a genus of fungi within the Hyaloscyphaceae family. This is a monotypic genus, containing the single species Tapesina griseovitellina.
