= Anavirga =

Scientific classification
- Kingdom: Fungi
- Division: Ascomycota
- Class: Leotiomycetes
- Order: Helotiales
- Family: Vibrisseaceae
- Genus: Anavirga; B.Sutton (1975)

Type species
- Anavirga laxa B.Sutton (1975)

Species
- A. dendromorpha A. laxa A. vermiformis

Genus of fungi

Anavirga is a genus of three anamorphic fungi in the family Vibrisseaceae. All three species are known from Europe.
