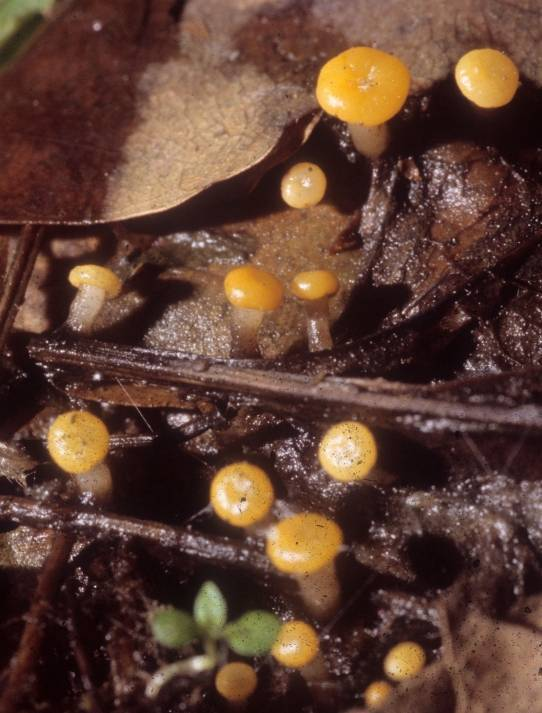
- Vibrissea truncorum

Scientific classification
- Kingdom: Fungi
- Division: Ascomycota
- Class: Leotiomycetes
- Order: Helotiales
- Family: Vibrisseaceae
- Genus: Vibrissea; Fr. (1822)

Type species
- Vibrissea truncorum (Alb. & Schwein.) Fr. (1822)

Synonyms
- Apostemium P.Karst. (1870); Apostemidium P.Karst. (1871); Ophiogloea Clem. (1903)

= Vibrissea =

Genus of fungi

Vibrissea is a genus of fungi in the family Vibrisseaceae. According to the Dictionary of the Fungi (10th edition, 2008), the widespread genus encompasses about 30 semiaquatic to aquatic species.

== Species ==
- Vibrissea albofusca
- Vibrissea catarhyta
- Vibrissea decolorans
- Vibrissea dura
- Vibrissea fergussonii
- Vibrissea filisporia
- Vibrissea flavovirens
- Vibrissea guernisacii
- Vibrissea leptospora
- Vibrissea margarita
- Vibrissea microscopica
- Vibrissea norvegica
- Vibrissea nypicola
- Vibrissea pfisteri
- Vibrissea sporogyra
- Vibrissea truncorum
- Vibrissea turbinata
- Vibrissea vibrisseoides
