= Clavidisculum =

Scientific classification
- Domain: Eukaryota
- Kingdom: Fungi
- Division: Ascomycota
- Class: Leotiomycetes
- Order: Helotiales
- Family: Hyaloscyphaceae
- Genus: Clavidisculum; Kirschst.

Genus of fungi

Clavidisculum is a genus of fungi belonging to the family Hyaloscyphaceae.

The species of this genus are found in Eurasia.

Species:

- Clavidisculum caricis Raitv.
- Clavidisculum cupulinum Kirschst.
- Clavidisculum graminicola Raitv.
- Clavidisculum humuli (W.Phillips) Raitv.
- Clavidisculum incrustatum (Raitv.) Raitv.
- Clavidisculum karstenii Raitv.
- Clavidisculum kriegerianum Kirschst.
- Clavidisculum microsporum Graddon
- Clavidisculum phytolaccae (Raitv.) Raitv.
