= Betulina =

Scientific classification
- Kingdom: Fungi
- Division: Ascomycota
- Class: Leotiomycetes
- Order: Helotiales
- Family: Hyaloscyphaceae
- Genus: Betulina; Velen.

Type species
- Betulina hirta Velen.

Species
- Betulina hirta Betulina fuscostipitata

Genus of fungi

Betulina is a genus of fungi within the Hyaloscyphaceae family. The genus contains 2 species.
