= Phaeoscypha =

Scientific classification
- Kingdom: Fungi
- Division: Ascomycota
- Class: Leotiomycetes
- Order: Helotiales
- Family: Hyaloscyphaceae
- Genus: Phaeoscypha; Spooner

Type species
- Phaeoscypha cladii (Nag Raj & W.B. Kendr.) Spooner

Species
- P. cladii P. pteridicola

Genus of fungi

Phaeoscypha is a genus of fungi within the Hyaloscyphaceae family. The genus contains xx species.
