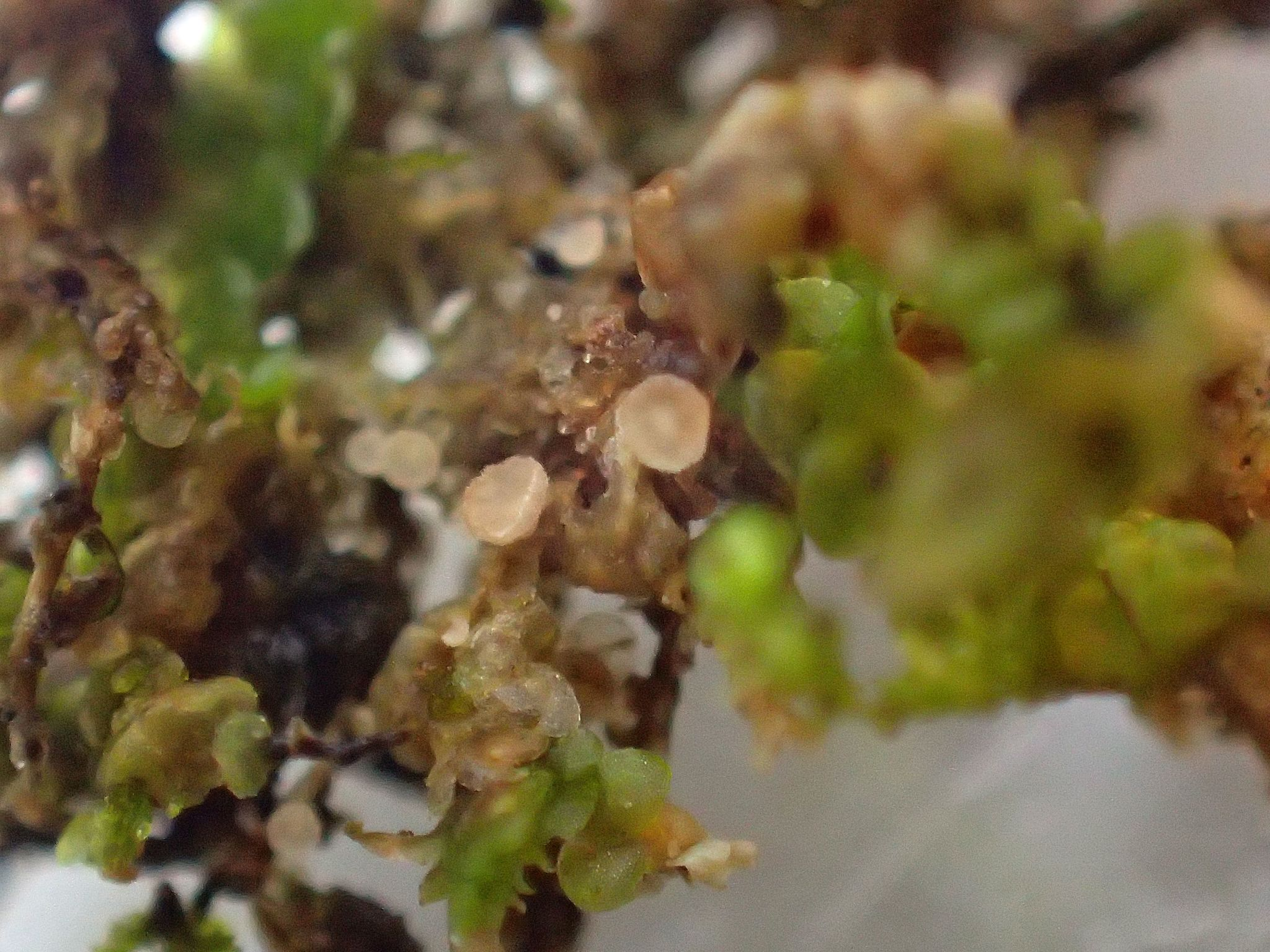
- Pithyella chalaudii on Frullania dilatata

Scientific classification
- Kingdom: Fungi
- Division: Ascomycota
- Class: Leotiomycetes
- Order: Helotiales
- Family: Hyaloscyphaceae
- Genus: Pithyella; Boud.

= Pithyella =

Genus of fungi

Pithyella is a genus of fungi in the family Hyaloscyphaceae. The genus contains 8 species.
