= Neodasyscypha =

Scientific classification
- Domain: Eukaryota
- Kingdom: Fungi
- Division: Ascomycota
- Class: Leotiomycetes
- Order: Helotiales
- Family: Hyaloscyphaceae
- Genus: Neodasyscypha; Suková & Spooner

Genus of fungi

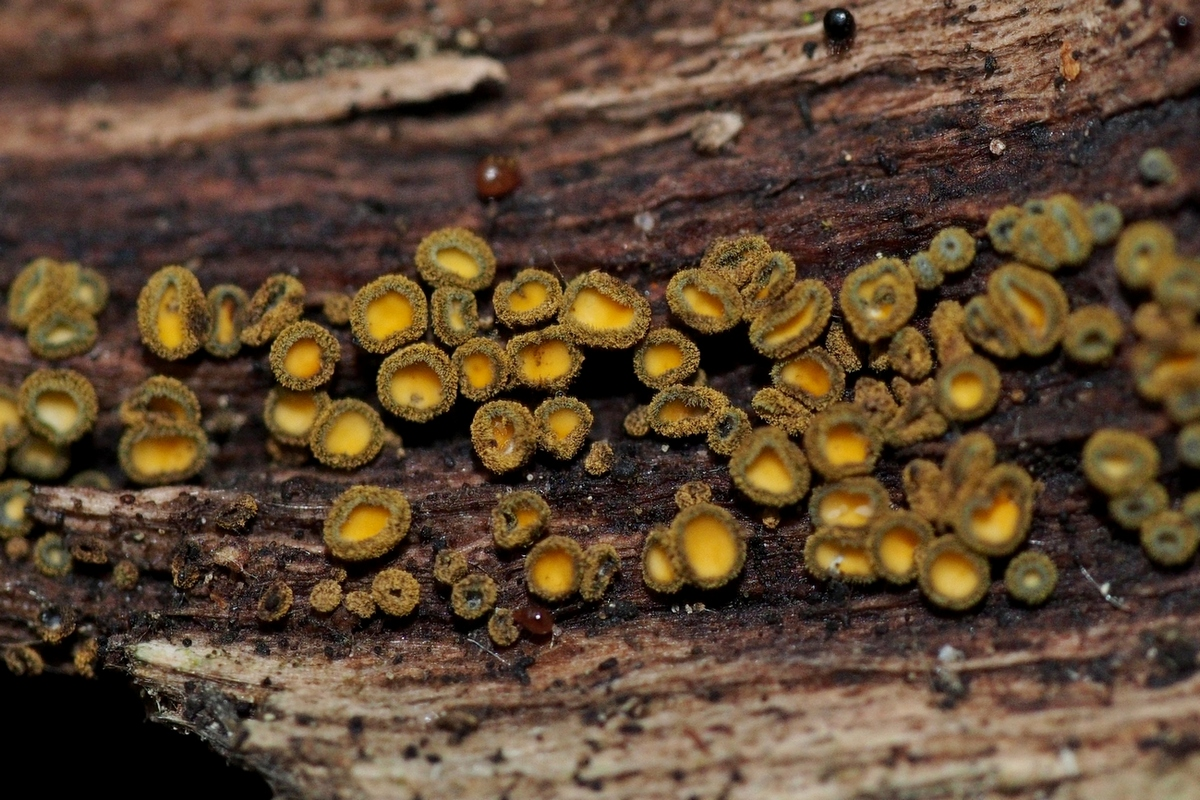

Neodasyscypha is a genus of fungi belonging to the family Hyaloscyphaceae.

The species of this genus are found in Europe, Northern America and Australia.

Species:

- Neodasyscypha cerina (Pers.) Spooner
- Neodasyscypha subciboria (Rodway) Spooner
