= Proprioscypha =

Scientific classification
- Kingdom: Fungi
- Division: Ascomycota
- Class: Leotiomycetes
- Order: Helotiales
- Family: Hyaloscyphaceae
- Genus: Proprioscypha; Spooner

Type species
- Proprioscypha corticicola Spooner

Species
- P. corticicola P. echinulata

Genus of fungi

Proprioscypha is a genus of fungi within the Hyaloscyphaceae family.
