= Graddonidiscus =

Scientific classification
- Kingdom: Fungi
- Division: Ascomycota
- Class: Leotiomycetes
- Order: Helotiales
- Family: Hyaloscyphaceae
- Genus: Graddonidiscus; Raitv. & R. Galán

Type species
- Graddonidiscus coruscatus (Graddon) Raitv. & R. Galán

Genus of fungi

Graddonidiscus is a genus of fungi within the Hyaloscyphaceae family. The genus contains 3 species.
