= Parachnopeziza =

Scientific classification
- Kingdom: Fungi
- Division: Ascomycota
- Class: Leotiomycetes
- Order: Helotiales
- Family: Hyaloscyphaceae
- Genus: Parachnopeziza; Korf

Type species
- Parachnopeziza miniopsis (Ellis) Korf

Genus of fungi

Parachnopeziza is a genus of fungi within the Hyaloscyphaceae family. The genus contains 8 species.
