= Didonia =

Scientific classification
- Kingdom: Fungi
- Division: Ascomycota
- Class: Leotiomycetes
- Order: Helotiales
- Family: Hyaloscyphaceae
- Genus: Didonia; Velen.

Genus of fungi

Didonia is a genus of fungi within the Hyaloscyphaceae family. The genus contains 5 species.
