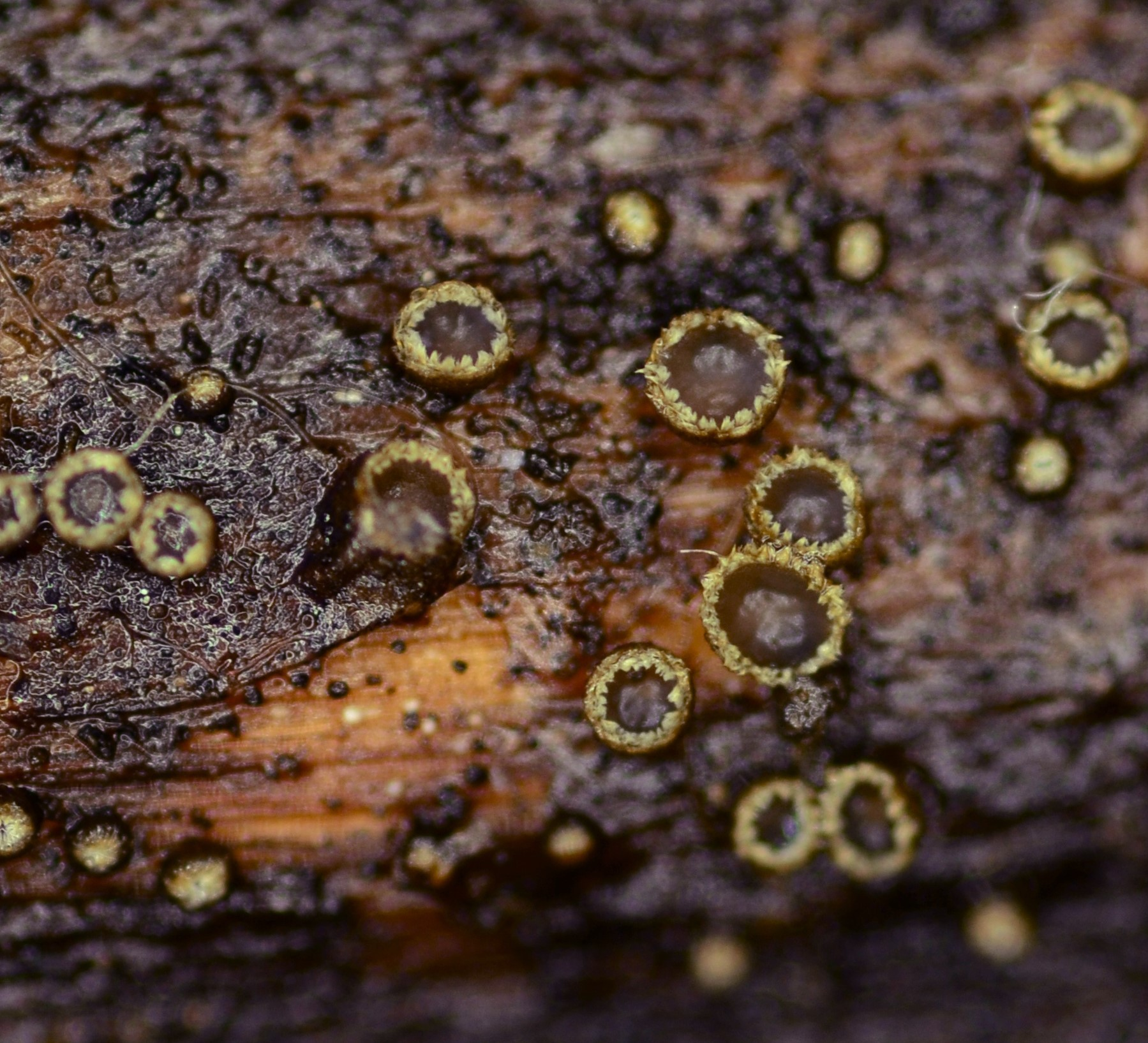
- unknown Trichopeziza

Scientific classification
- Kingdom: Fungi
- Division: Ascomycota
- Class: Leotiomycetes
- Order: Helotiales
- Family: Hyaloscyphaceae
- Genus: Trichopeziza; Fuckel

Type species
- Trichopeziza sulphurea (Pers.) Fuckel

= Trichopeziza =

Genus of fungi

Trichopeziza is a genus of fungi within the Hyaloscyphaceae family.
