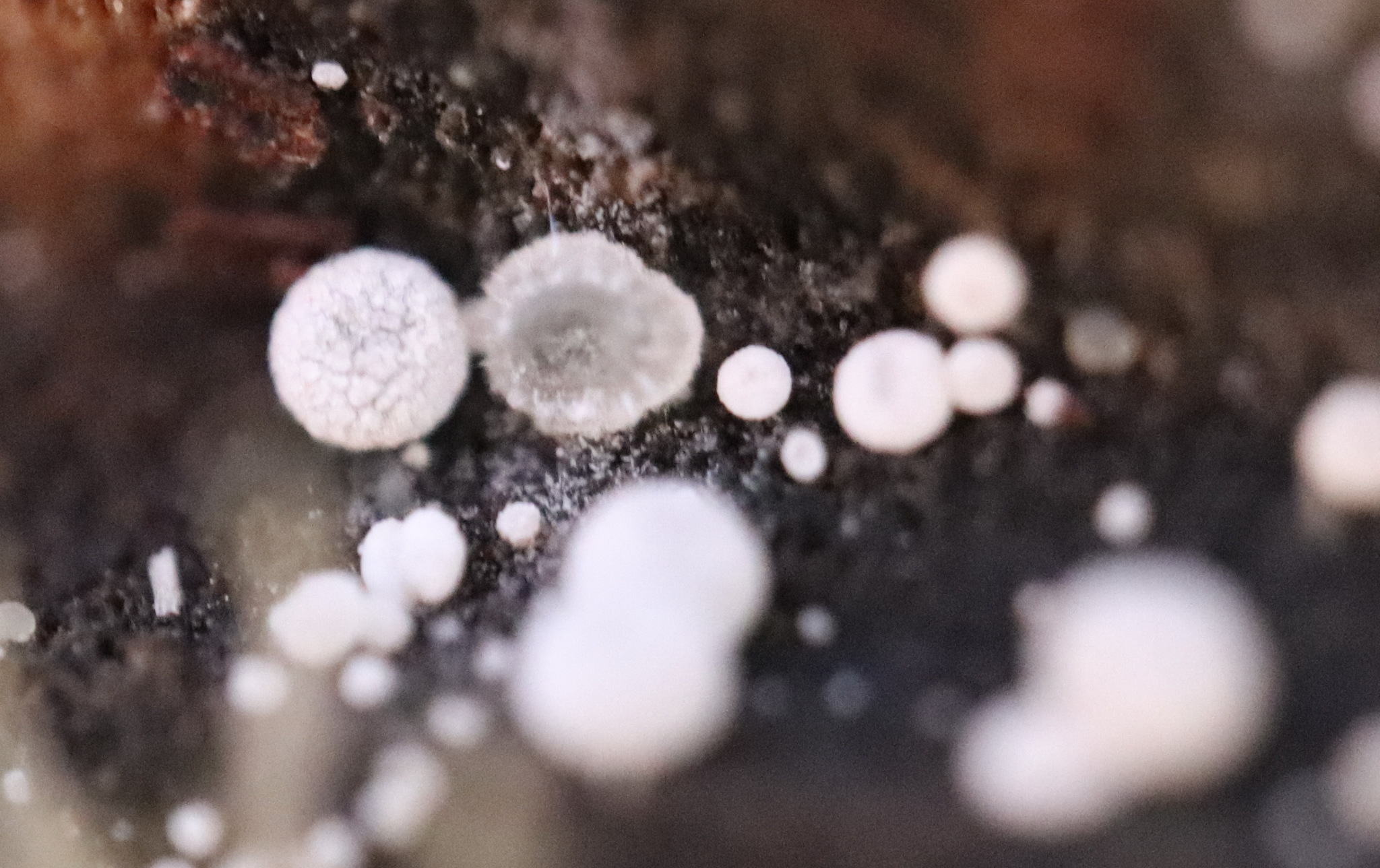
- Polydesmia pruinosa

Scientific classification
- Kingdom: Fungi
- Division: Ascomycota
- Class: Leotiomycetes
- Order: Helotiales
- Family: Hyaloscyphaceae
- Genus: Polydesmia; Boud.

Type species
- Polydesmia pruinosa (Gerd. ex Berk. & Broome) Boud.

= Polydesmia =

Genus of fungi

Polydesmia is a genus of fungi within the family Hyaloscyphaceae. The genus contains 7 species.
