= Pubigera =

Scientific classification
- Kingdom: Fungi
- Division: Ascomycota
- Class: Leotiomycetes
- Order: Helotiales
- Family: Hyaloscyphaceae
- Genus: Pubigera; Baral, Gminder & Svrček

Type species
- Pubigera subvillosula (Rehm) Baral, Gminder & Svrček

Genus of fungi

Pubigera is a genus of fungi within the Hyaloscyphaceae family. This is a monotypic genus, containing the single species Pubigera subvillosula.
