= Hegermila =

Scientific classification
- Kingdom: Fungi
- Division: Ascomycota
- Class: Leotiomycetes
- Order: Helotiales
- Family: Hyaloscyphaceae
- Genus: Hegermila; Raitv.

Type species
- Hegermila andina (Pat.) Raitv.

Genus of fungi

Hegermila is a genus of fungi within the Hyaloscyphaceae family. The genus contains 4 species.

== Species ==
As accepted by Species Fungorum;

- Hegermila andina (Pat.) Raitv. (1995)
- Hegermila crassispora Raitv. & Järv (1995)
- Hegermila octopartita Raitv. & Järv (1995)
- Hegermila vermispora Raitv. & Järv (1995)
