= Diplococcium =

Scientific classification
- Kingdom: Fungi
- Division: Ascomycota
- Class: Leotiomycetes
- Order: Helotiales
- Family: Vibrisseaceae
- Genus: Diplococcium; Grove, 1885

Genus of fungi

Diplococcium is a genus of fungi belonging to the family Vibrisseaceae.

The genus has almost cosmopolitan distribution.

== Species ==
Species:

- Diplococcium aquaticum Goh, K.D.Hyde & Umali
- Diplococcium asperum Piroz.
- Diplococcium atrovelutinum U.Braun, Hosag. & T.K.Abraham
- Diplococcium bicolor
- Diplococcium capitatum
- Diplococcium clarkii
- Diplococcium clavariarum
- Diplococcium constrictum
- Diplococcium dendrocalami
- Diplococcium graminearum
- Diplococcium grovei
- Diplococcium heterosporum
- Diplococcium insolitium
- Diplococcium lawrencei
- Diplococcium laxusporum
- Diplococcium pandani
- Diplococcium parcum
- Diplococcium peruamazonicum
- Diplococcium pulneyense
- Diplococcium spicatum
- Diplococcium stoveri
- Diplococcium varieseptatum
