= Trichophaea hemisphaerioides =

Scientific classification
- Domain: Eukaryota
- Kingdom: Fungi
- Division: Ascomycota
- Class: Pezizomycetes
- Order: Pezizales
- Family: Pyronemataceae
- Genus: Trichophaea
- Species: T. hemisphaerioides

Binomial name
- Trichophaea hemisphaerioides Mouton, 1897

Species of fungus

Trichophaea hemisphaerioides is a European species of apothecial fungus belonging to the family Pyronemataceae. They appear as whitish cups with brown hairs on the margin and outer surface, up to 1.5 cm across on recently burned ground, often amongst mosses such as Funaria.
