= Calyptellopsis =

Scientific classification
- Kingdom: Fungi
- Division: Ascomycota
- Class: Leotiomycetes
- Order: Helotiales
- Family: Hyaloscyphaceae
- Genus: Calyptellopsis; Svrček

Type species
- Calyptellopsis reticulata (Vacek) Svrček

Genus of fungi

Calyptellopsis is a genus of fungi within the Hyaloscyphaceae family. This is a monotypic genus, containing the single species Calyptellopsis reticulata.
