= Hamatocanthoscypha =

Scientific classification
- Kingdom: Fungi
- Division: Ascomycota
- Class: Leotiomycetes
- Order: Helotiales
- Family: Hyaloscyphaceae
- Genus: Hamatocanthoscypha; Svrček

Type species
- Hamatocanthoscypha laricionis (Velen.) Svrček

Genus of fungi

Hamatocanthoscypha is a genus of fungi within the Hyaloscyphaceae family. The genus contains about 13 species.

Species:

- Hamatocanthoscypha laricionis
- Hamatocanthoscypha ocellata
- Hamatocanthoscypha straminella
- Hamatocanthoscypha uncinata
- Hamatocanthoscypha uncipila
