= Gelatinodiscus =

Scientific classification
- Kingdom: Fungi
- Division: Ascomycota
- Class: Leotiomycetes
- Order: Helotiales
- Family: Helotiaceae
- Genus: Gelatinodiscus; Kanouse & A.H. Sm.

Type species
- Gelatinodiscus flavidus Kanouse & A.H. Sm.

Genus of fungi

Gelatinodiscus is a genus of fungi in the family Helotiaceae. This is a monotypic genus, containing the single species Gelatinodiscus flavidus.
