= Velutaria =

Scientific classification
- Kingdom: Fungi
- Division: Ascomycota
- Class: Leotiomycetes
- Order: Helotiales
- Family: Hyaloscyphaceae
- Genus: Velutaria; Fuckel

Type species
- Velutaria griseovitellina (Fuckel) Fuckel

Genus of fungi

Velutaria is a genus of fungi within the Hyaloscyphaceae family.
