= Bryoglossum =

Scientific classification
- Kingdom: Fungi
- Division: Ascomycota
- Class: Leotiomycetes
- Order: Helotiales
- Family: Hyaloscyphaceae
- Genus: Bryoglossum; Redhead

Type species
- Bryoglossum gracile (P. Karst.) Redhead

Species
- Bryoglossum gracile Bryoglossum rehmii

Genus of fungi

Bryoglossum is a genus of fungi within the Hyaloscyphaceae family. The genus contains 2 species.
