= Amicodisca =

Scientific classification
- Kingdom: Fungi
- Division: Ascomycota
- Class: Leotiomycetes
- Order: Helotiales
- Family: Hyaloscyphaceae
- Genus: Amicodisca; Svrček

Type species
- Amicodisca brdensis (Velen.) Svrček

Genus of fungi

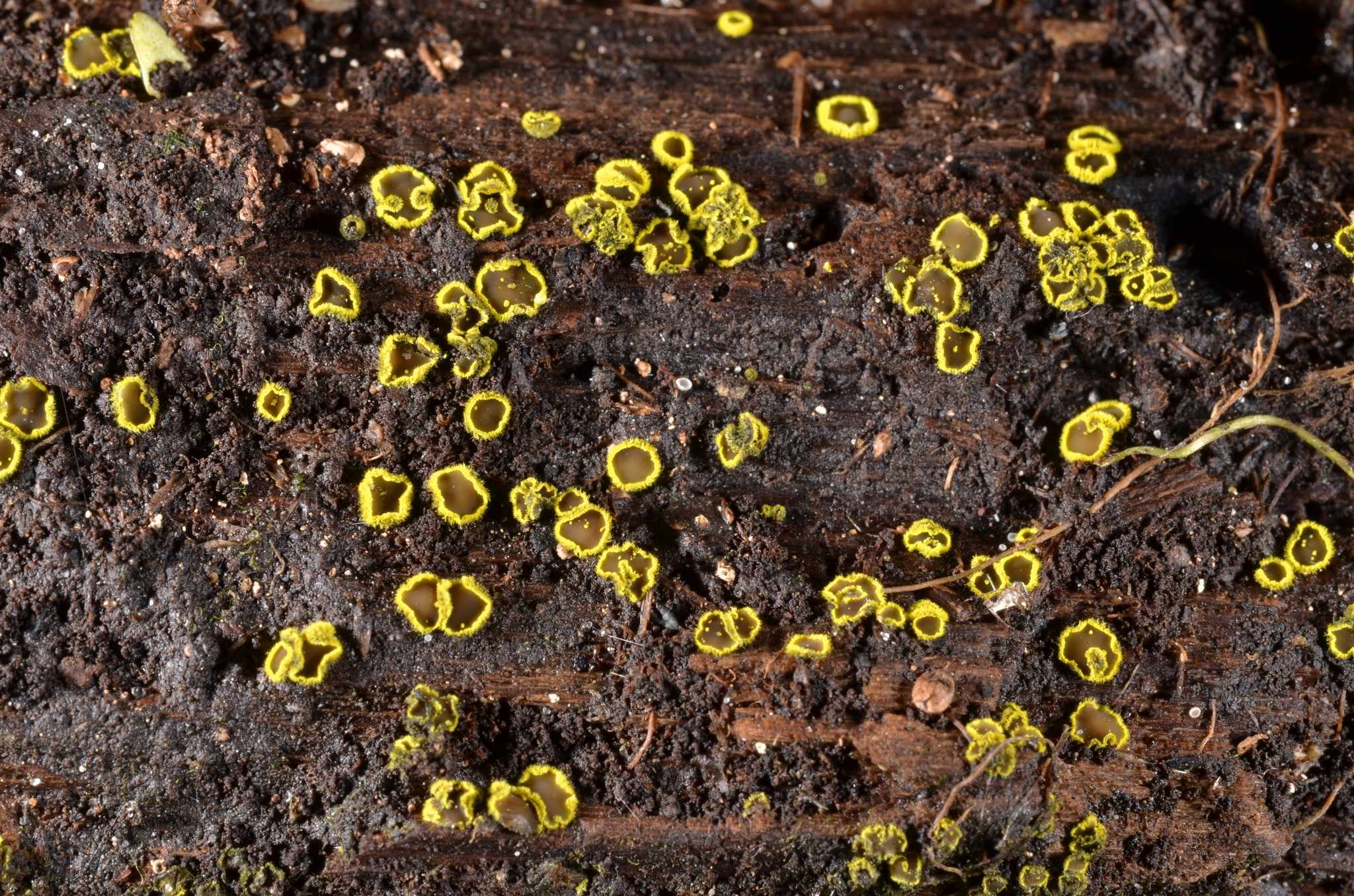
Amicodisca virella

Amicodisca is a genus of fungi within the Hyaloscyphaceae family. The genus contains 5 species.
