= Urceolella =

Scientific classification
- Kingdom: Fungi
- Division: Ascomycota
- Class: Leotiomycetes
- Order: Helotiales
- Family: Hyaloscyphaceae
- Genus: Urceolella; Boud.

Type species
- Urceolella crispula (P. Karst.) Boud.

Genus of fungi

Urceolella is a genus of fungi within the Hyaloscyphaceae family. The genus contains 23 species. Species Fungorum accepts 44 species.

== Species ==
As accepted by Species Fungorum;

- Urceolella aasii S. Olsen & J.H. Haines (1993)
- Urceolella amphipila Huhtinen (1987)
- Urceolella appressipila Graddon (1986)
- Urceolella arundinella (Sacc. & Speg.) Boud. (1907)
- Urceolella arundinis (Fr.) Boud. (1907)
- Urceolella brunneola Hosoya (1997)
- Urceolella cookei (Pass.) Dennis (1963)
- Urceolella corticicola (Dennis) Dennis (1963)
- Urceolella crispula (P. Karst.) Boud. (1907)
- Urceolella curvipila (P. Karst.) Raschle (1977)
- Urceolella dryadicola Raitv. & Chleb. (2003)
- Urceolella elaphoides (Sacc.) Boud. (1907)
- Urceolella equiseti (Huhtinen) Huhtinen (1987)
- Urceolella galii (Mouton) Boud. (1907)
- Urceolella glacialis (Raitv.) Raitv. (1993)
- Urceolella hirta (Velen.) Svrček, J.R. De Sloover & Baral (2009)
- Urceolella iridis Rea (1920)
- Urceolella juniperi (Velen.) Huhtinen (2001)
- Urceolella lycopodii (Le Bret. & Malbr.) Boud. (1907)
- Urceolella nectrioidea (Rehm) Boud. (1907)
- Urceolella nivea Raschle (1977)
- Urceolella pallida (Velen.) Huhtinen (2001)
- Urceolella pani (Velen.) Huhtinen (1988)
- Urceolella papillaris (Bull.) Boud. (1907)
- Urceolella peleana Huhtinen & Raitv. (1997)
- Urceolella piceae (Pers.) Boud. (1907)
- Urceolella pinicola Raitv. & R. Galán (1993)
- Urceolella pseudacori (Feltgen) Boud. (1907)
- Urceolella pseudopezizoides (Rehm) Boud. (1907)
- Urceolella pulverulenta (Rehm) Boud. (1907)
- Urceolella punctiformis Boud. (1907)
- Urceolella radians (Saut.) Boud. (1907)
- Urceolella rehmiana (M. Rousseau & E. Bommer) Boud. (1907)
- Urceolella rufula (Sacc.) Boud. (1907)
- Urceolella salicicola Raschle (1977)
- Urceolella saxifragae Svrček (1967)
- Urceolella saxonica (Rehm) Boud. (1907)
- Urceolella seminis (Cooke & W. Phillips) Dennis (1963)
- Urceolella stilbum (Fuckel) Boud. (1907)
- Urceolella struthiopteridis (Saut.) Boud. (1907)
- Urceolella tetraspora (Rehm) E. Müll. (1968)
- Urceolella todeae Raitv. & Schneller (2007)
- Urceolella triseptata Raitv. & R. Galán (1993)
- Urceolella tuberculiformis (Ellis & Everh.) Dennis (1963)

== Former species ==
A lot of species of Urceolella have been moved to other genera and families;

- U. absinthii (Lasch) Boud. (1907) = Pyrenopeziza absinthii Ploettnerulaceae family
- U. acerina (Mouton) Boud. (1907) = Mollisina acerina Pezizellaceae
- U. aconiti (Saut.) Boud. (1907) = Calycella aconiti Helotiaceae
- U. aspera (Moug. ex Fr.) Boud. (1907) = Unguicularia aspera Helotiales
- U. aspidii (Lib.) Boud. (1907) = Incrupila aspidii Hyaloscyphaceae
- U. asterostoma (W. Phillips) Boud. (1885) = Peziza asterostoma Pezizaceae
- U. atomaria (Starbäck) Boud. (1907) = Hyaloscypha atomaria Hyaloscyphaceae
- U. berkeleyi (A. Bloxam) Boud. (1907) = Cistella grevillei Helotiales
- U. carestiana (Rabenh.) Dennis (1963) = Unguicularia carestiana Helotiales
- U. chionea (Massee & Crossl.) Rehm (1912) = Mollisia chionea Mollisiaceae
- U. cirrhata (P. Crouan & H. Crouan) Boud. (1907) = Hyalopeziza millepunctata Hyaloscyphaceae
- U. costata (Boud.) Boud. (1904) = Unguicularia costata Helotiales
- U. deparcula (P. Karst.) Boud. (1907) = Calycellina ulmariae Pezizellaceae
- U. dispersella (P. Karst.) Boud. (1907) = Crocicreas dispersellum Helotiales
- U. effugiens (Roberge ex Desm.) Boud. (1907) = Trichopeziza effugiens Lachnaceae
- U. elaphines (Berk. & Broome) Boud. (1907) = Hyalopeziza millepunctata Hyaloscyphaceae
- U. elegantula (P. Karst.) Boud. (1907) = Lasiobelonium elegantulum Solenopeziaceae
- U. epicalamia (Fuckel) Boud. (1907) = Crocicreas epicalamia Helotiales
- U. eurotioides (P. Karst.) Boud. (1907) = Unguiculella eurotioides Hyaloscyphaceae
- U. flaveola (Cooke) Boud. (1907) = Hyaloscypha flaveola Hyaloscyphaceae
- U. fugiens (W. Phillips) Boud. (1907) = Cistella fugiens Helotiales
- U. graminicola Raitv. (1968) = Clavidisculum graminicola Hyaloscyphaceae
- U. hamulata (Rehm) Korf & L.M. Kohn (1980) = Hyalacrotes hamulata Calloriaceae
- U. ilicis Grelet (1926) = Calycellina ilicis Pezizellaceae
- U. incarnatina (Quél.) Boud. (1907) = Unguiculella incarnatina Hyaloscyphaceae
- U. lachnobrachya (Desm.) Boud. (1907) = Calycellina lachnobrachya Pezizellaceae
- U. leuconica (Cooke ex Stev.) Boud. (1907) = Hyaloscypha leuconica Hyaloscyphaceae
- U. leucostoma (Rehm) Boud. (1907) = Solenopezia leucostoma Solenopeziaceae
- U. mali (Rehm) Boud. (1907) = Cistella mali Helotiales
- U. melaxantha (Fr.) Boud. (1907) = Tryblidaria melaxantha Patellariaceae
- U. micacea (Pers.) Boud. (1907) = Psilachnum micaceum Pezizellaceae
- U. miliaris (Wallr.) Boud. (1907) = Scutula miliaris Byssolomataceae
- U. misella (Roberge ex Desm.) Boud. (1907) = Fuscolachnum misellum Hyphodiscaceae
- U. occulta (Ces.) Boud. (1907) = Psilachnum occultum Pezizellaceae
- U. paradoxa (P. Karst.) Boud. (1907) = Clibanites paradoxus Bionectriaceae
- U. paulula (Roberge ex Desm.) Boud. (1907) = Diplonaevia paulula Calloriaceae
- U. pseudopani Hosoya (1997) = Hyalacrotes pseudopani Calloriaceae
- U. pteridis (Alb. & Schwein.) Boud. (1907) = Fuscolachnum pteridis Hyphodiscaceae
- U. puberula (Lasch) Boud. (1907) = Calycellina punctata Pezizellaceae
- U. pulveracea (Fuckel) Boud. (1907) = Pyrenopeziza pulveracea Ploettnerulaceae
- U. richonis Boud. (1889) = Dematioscypha richonis Hyaloscyphaceae
- U. scirpicola (Fuckel) Boud. (1907) = Micropeziza scirpicola Pezizellaceae
- U. scrupulosa (P. Karst.) Boud. (1907) = Hyalopeziza millepunctata Hyaloscyphaceae
- U. scrupulosa var. carpini (Sacc.) Boud. (1907) = Hyalopeziza millepunctata Hyaloscyphaceae
- U. scrupulosa var. caulia (Sacc.) Boud. (1907) = Hyalopeziza millepunctata Hyaloscyphaceae
- U. spiraeae (Sacc.) Boud. (1907) = Calycellina spiraeae Pezizellaceae
- U. stereicola (Cooke) Boud. (1907) = Cistellina stereicola Hyphodiscaceae
- U. stevensonii (Berk. & Broome) Boud. (1907) = Hyaloscypha aureliella Hyaloscyphaceae
- U. subglobosa (Saut.) Boud. (1907) = Lachnella subglobosa Niaceae
- U. tami (Lamy) Boud. (1907) = Psilachnum tami Pezizellaceae
- U. tami var. humuli (W. Phillips) Boud. (1907 = Clavidisculum humuli Hyaloscyphaceae
- U. tenuicula (P. Karst.) Boud. (1907) = Helotium tenuiculum Tricladiaceae
- U. trichodea (W. Phillips & Plowr.) Dennis (1963) = Hyalopeziza trichodea Hyaloscyphaceae
- U. ulmariae Boud. (1907) = Pseudohelotium ulmariae Helotiaceae
- U. versicolor (Desm.) Boud. (1907) = Psilachnum chrysostigmum Pezizellaceae
- U. viburnicola (Berk. & Broome) Boud. (1907) = Pyrenopeziza commoda Ploettnerulaceae
- U. winteriana (Rehm) Dennis (1963) = Hyalopeziza winteriana Hyaloscyphaceae
