= Polaroscyphus =

Scientific classification
- Kingdom: Fungi
- Division: Ascomycota
- Class: Leotiomycetes
- Order: Helotiales
- Family: Hyaloscyphaceae
- Genus: Polaroscyphus; Huhtinen

Type species
- Polaroscyphus spetsbergianus Huhtinen

Genus of fungi

Polaroscyphus is a genus of fungi within the Hyaloscyphaceae family. This is a monotypic genus, containing the single species Polaroscyphus spetsbergianus.
