= Solenopezia =

Scientific classification
- Kingdom: Fungi
- Division: Ascomycota
- Class: Leotiomycetes
- Order: Helotiales
- Family: Hyaloscyphaceae
- Genus: Solenopezia; Sacc.

Type species
- Peziza solenia Peck.

Genus of fungi

Solenopezia is a genus of fungi within the Hyaloscyphaceae family. The genus contains seven species.
