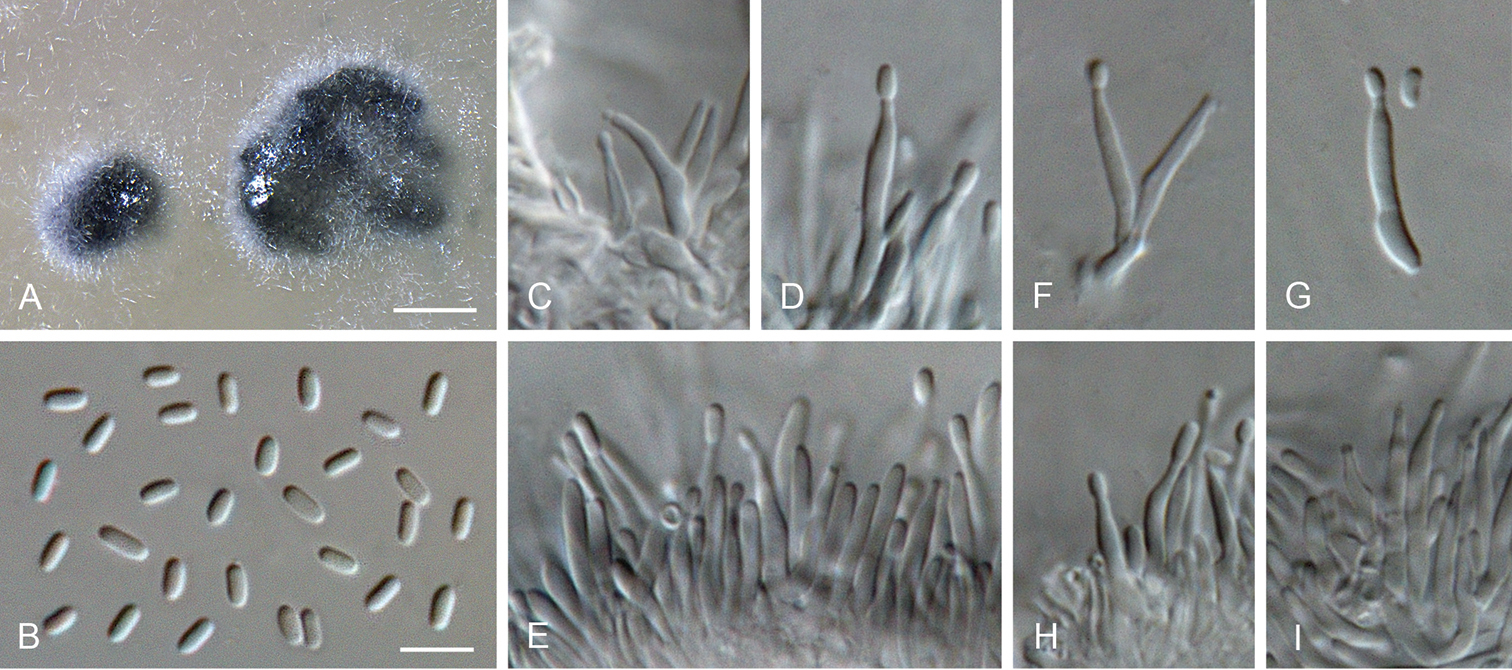
- Proliferodiscus ingens

Scientific classification
- Kingdom: Fungi
- Division: Ascomycota
- Class: Leotiomycetes
- Order: Helotiales
- Family: Hyaloscyphaceae
- Genus: Proliferodiscus; J.H. Haines & Dumont

Type species
- Proliferodiscus inspersus (Berk. & M.A. Curtis) J.H. Haines & Dumont

= Proliferodiscus =

Genus of fungi

Proliferodiscus is a genus of fungi within the Hyaloscyphaceae family. The genus contains seven species.
