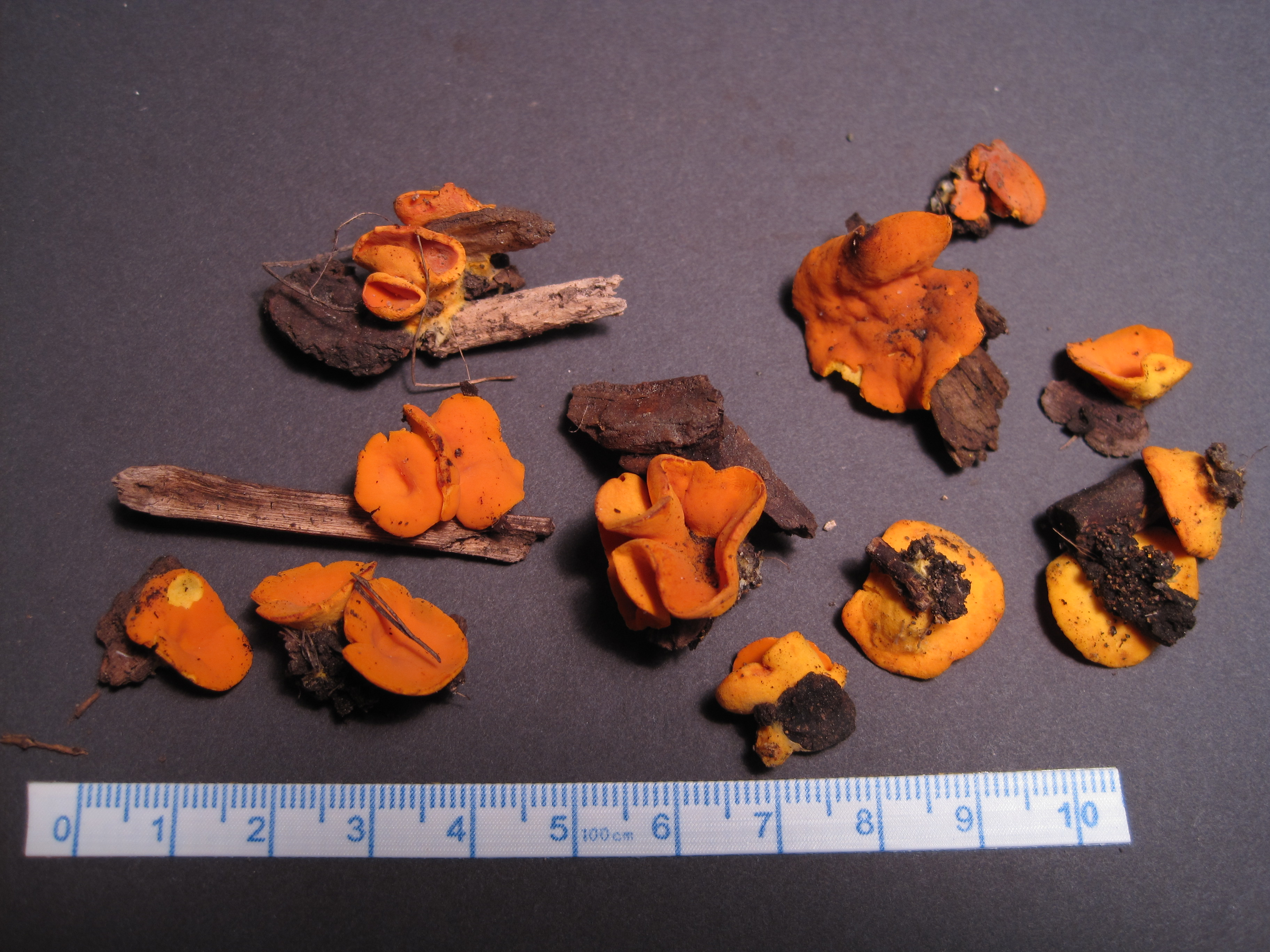
- Acervus epispartius

Scientific classification
- Domain: Eukaryota
- Kingdom: Fungi
- Division: Ascomycota
- Class: Pezizomycetes
- Order: Pezizales
- Family: Pyronemataceae
- Genus: Acervus; Kanouse (1938)

Type species
- Acervus aurantiacus Kanouse (1938)

Species
- A. aurantiacus A. beijingense A. changchunense A. epispartius A. flavidus A. lusakianus A. xishuangbannicus

= Acervus =

Genus of fungi

Acervus is a genus of fungi in the family Pyronemataceae. They have cup-shaped fruitbodies that may be up to 1.5 cm (0.6 in) in diameter, with a bright yellow to orange-colored hymenium. Fruitbodies occur on soil, duff, and plant debris. Six of the seven species in the genus are found in China.
