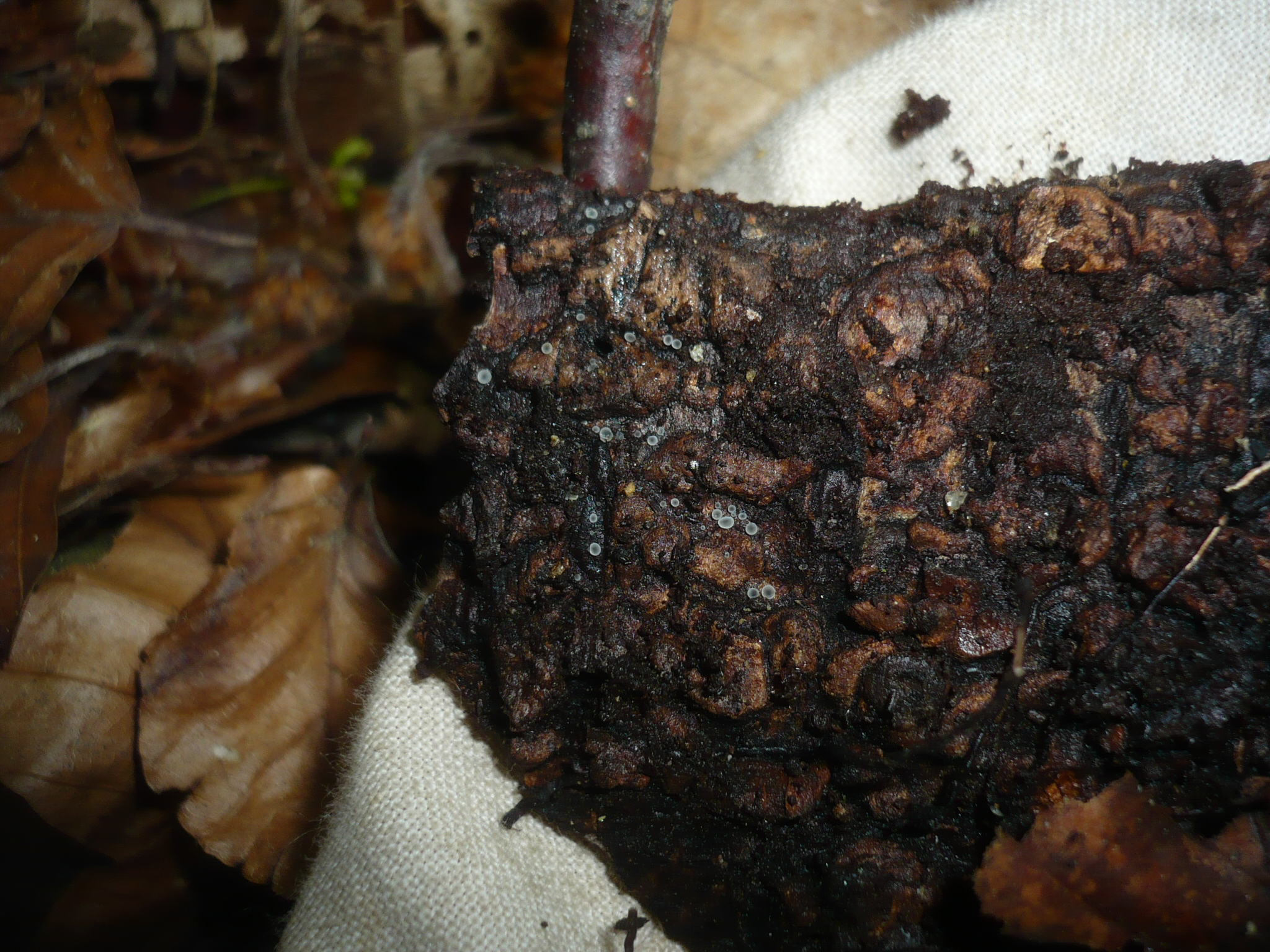
- Olla transiens on hardwood

Scientific classification
- Kingdom: Fungi
- Division: Ascomycota
- Class: Leotiomycetes
- Order: Helotiales
- Family: Hyaloscyphaceae
- Genus: Olla; Velen.

Type species
- Olla ulmariae Velen.

= Olla (fungus) =

Genus of fungi

Olla is a genus of fungi within the Hyaloscyphaceae family. The genus contains 12 species.
