= Trichophaea woolhopeia =

Scientific classification
- Domain: Eukaryota
- Kingdom: Fungi
- Division: Ascomycota
- Class: Pezizomycetes
- Order: Pezizales
- Family: Pyronemataceae
- Genus: Trichophaea
- Species: T. woolhopeia

Binomial name
- Trichophaea woolhopeia Cooke & W. Phillips, 1875

Species of fungus

Trichophaea woolhopeia is a species complex of ectomycorrhizal fungi belonging to the family Pyronemataceae. There are at least 4 well-resolved cryptic species within the complex, including Quercirhiza quadratum and AD (Angle Droit). They are European species that appear on damp ground, with apothecial fruiting bodies that appear as tiny (up to 6 mm across) whitish cups with brown hairs on the margin and outer surface.
