= Hyalopeziza =

Scientific classification
- Kingdom: Fungi
- Division: Ascomycota
- Class: Leotiomycetes
- Order: Helotiales
- Family: Hyaloscyphaceae
- Genus: Hyalopeziza; Fuckel

Type species
- Hyalopeziza patula (Pers.) Fuckel

Genus of fungi

Hyalopeziza is a genus of fungi within the Hyaloscyphaceae family. The genus contains 20 species.
