= Ciliolarina =

Scientific classification
- Kingdom: Fungi
- Division: Ascomycota
- Class: Leotiomycetes
- Order: Helotiales
- Family: Hyaloscyphaceae
- Genus: Ciliolarina; Svrček

Type species
- Ciliolarina laricina (Raitv.) Svrček

Genus of fungi

Ciliolarina is a genus of fungi within the Hyaloscyphaceae family. The genus contains 6 species.
