= Otwaya =

Scientific classification
- Kingdom: Fungi
- Division: Ascomycota
- Class: Leotiomycetes
- Order: Helotiales
- Family: Hyaloscyphaceae
- Genus: Otwaya; G.W. Beaton

Type species
- Otwaya verruculospora G.W. Beaton

Genus of fungi

Otwaya is a genus of fungi within the Hyaloscyphaceae family. This is a monotypic genus, containing the single species Otwaya verruculospora.
