= Grégoire L. Hennebert =

Belgian mycologist (1929–2021)

Grégoire Laurent Hennebert (20 June 1929 – 13 October 2021) was a Belgian plant pathologist and founding co-editor of the journal Mycotaxon. He was a prominent expert on the fungus genus Botyris and made significant contributions to the field of fungal nomenclature and taxonomy. Hennebert was a professor at University of Louvain and director of the Mycothèque de l’Université Catholique de Louvain (MUCL).

== Life and work ==
Hennebert was born in Mons, Belgium. He studied plant pathology at University of Louvain and received his doctorate in 1956. He later spent two years in Ottawa as a postdoctoral fellow with Stanley Hughes. In 1961, during a break in his trip, Hennebert travelled to Cornell University to study collected specimens and first met Richard P. Korf, with whom he would start the journal Mycotaxon in 1974.

Hennebert was actively engaged in taxonomic debates, serving for many years on the Special Committee for Nomenclature of Fungi and Lichens. He also played an important role, alongside Luella Weresub, in introducing the terms anamorph, teleomorph, and holomorph to mycology. Although they have since fallen from conventional use, Hennebert's influence was significant.

Inspired by his early undergraduate studies in Africa, Hennebert played a prominent role in advocating for mycology and plant pathology in Africa, especially at the University of Burundi. He later published the first Directory of African Mycologists.

He passed away in Ottignies-Louvain-la-Neuve, Belgium, on 13 October 2021 at the age of 92.
