= Cellulin =

Type of polysaccharide

Cellulin or cellulin granules are a type of polysaccharide found exclusively within the oomycetes of the order Leptomitales. Cellulin granules are composed of β-glucan and chitin. The experimentally determined composition of cellulin is 39% glucan (composed of beta-1,3- and beta-1,6-linked glucose units) and 60% chitin.

== Research ==
β-cellulin is a possible treatment to be able to repair corneal cells. At specific concentration of β-cellulin at 0.2, 2 and 20 ng/mL rapid repair was induced to corneal epithelial stem cells. During these concentrations β-cellulin promotes phosphorylation of erk1/2 signaling pathway in mice during cornea repair. To confirm this, the mutation of erk1/2 inhibited this pathway and slowed the repair of cornea cells in mice.

By increasing the growth factors up to 60 ng/mL of β-FGF and EGF and up to 30 ng/mL of activin A/β-cellulin, the production of insulin producing cells increased. However increasing the concentration of the growth factors further, had no additional effect on the increase. This study can possibly be the insight for developing a new way to treat type-1 diabetes, which currently can only be treated with injection of insulin.

Despite being produced in large quantities by pancreatic islet cells, β-cellulin, an epidermal growth factor, appears to have little relevance in regulating insulin production.

== See also ==
- β-glucan
- Cellulose
- Chitin
