= Fuscolachnum =

Scientific classification
- Kingdom: Fungi
- Division: Ascomycota
- Class: Leotiomycetes
- Order: Helotiales
- Family: Hyaloscyphaceae
- Genus: Fuscolachnum; J.H. Haines

Type species
- Fuscolachnum pteridis (Alb. & Schwein.) J.H. Haines

Genus of fungi

Fuscolachnum is a genus of fungi within the Hyaloscyphaceae family. The genus contains 7 species.
