= Unguicularia =

Scientific classification
- Kingdom: Fungi
- Division: Ascomycota
- Class: Leotiomycetes
- Order: Helotiales
- Family: Hyaloscyphaceae
- Genus: Unguicularia; Höhn.

Type species
- Unguicularia unguiculata Höhn.

Genus of fungi

Unguicularia is a genus of fungi within the Hyaloscyphaceae family. The genus contains seven species.
