= Protounguicularia =

Scientific classification
- Kingdom: Fungi
- Division: Ascomycota
- Class: Leotiomycetes
- Order: Helotiales
- Family: Hyaloscyphaceae
- Genus: Protounguicularia; Raitv. & R. Galán

Type species
- Protounguicularia brevicapitata Raitv. & R. Galán

Genus of fungi

Protounguicularia is a genus of fungi within the Hyaloscyphaceae family. The genus contains five species.
