= Hydrocina =

Scientific classification
- Kingdom: Fungi
- Division: Ascomycota
- Class: Leotiomycetes
- Order: Helotiales
- Family: Hyaloscyphaceae
- Genus: Hydrocina; Scheuer

Type species
- Hydrocina chaetocladia Scheuer

Genus of fungi

Hydrocina is a genus of fungi within the Hyaloscyphaceae family. This is a monotypic genus, containing the single species Hydrocina chaetocladia. H. chaetocladia is an aquatic hyphomycete, known from growing on leaves in streams and rivers.
