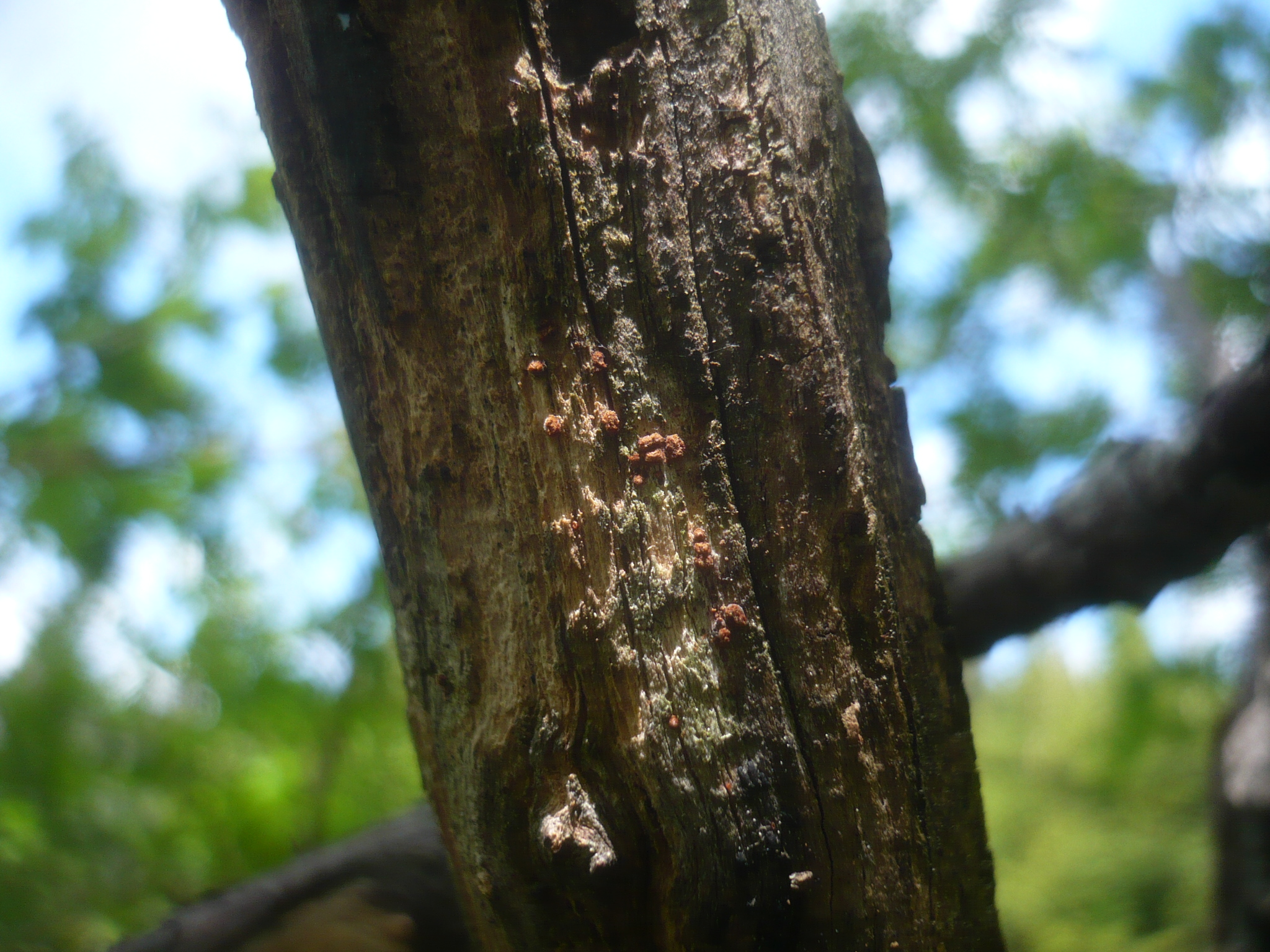
- Perrotia flammea

Scientific classification
- Kingdom: Fungi
- Division: Ascomycota
- Class: Leotiomycetes
- Order: Helotiales
- Family: Lachnaceae
- Genus: Perrotia; Boud.

Type species
- Perrotia flammea (Alb. & Schwein.) Boud.

= Perrotia (fungus) =

Genus of fungi

Perrotia is a genus of fungi within the family Lachnaceae. The genus contains 19 species.
