= Psilachnum =

Scientific classification
- Kingdom: Fungi
- Division: Ascomycota
- Class: Leotiomycetes
- Order: Helotiales
- Family: Hyaloscyphaceae
- Genus: Psilachnum; Höhn.

Type species
- Psilachnum lateritioalbum (P. Karst.) Höhn.

Genus of fungi

Psilachnum is a genus of fungi within the Hyaloscyphaceae family. The genus contains 27 species.
