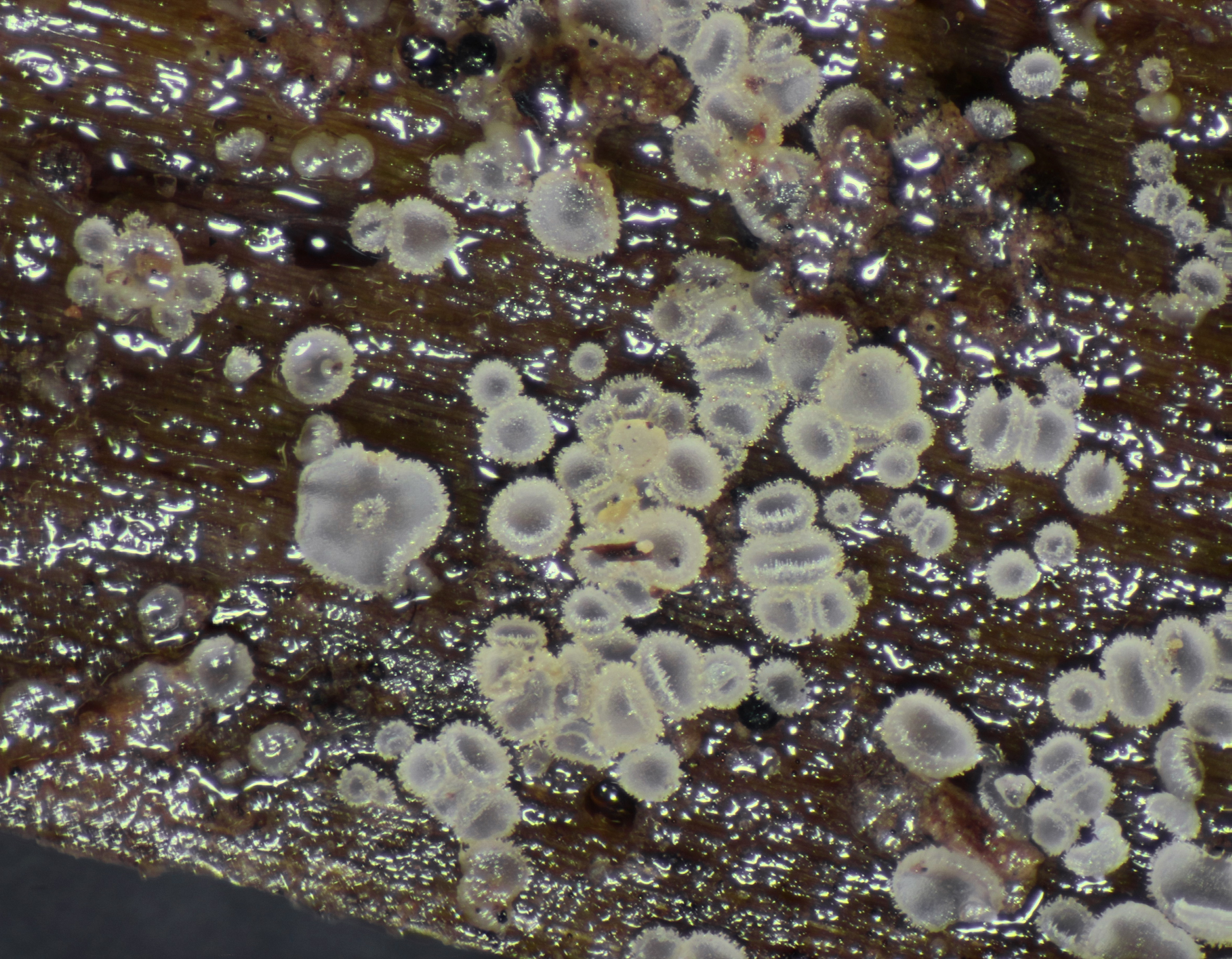
- Hyaloscypha aureliella

Scientific classification
- Kingdom: Fungi
- Division: Ascomycota
- Class: Leotiomycetes
- Order: Helotiales
- Family: Hyaloscyphaceae
- Genus: Hyaloscypha; Boud.

Type species
- Hyaloscypha vitreola (P. Karst.) Boud.

= Hyaloscypha =

Genus of fungi

Hyaloscypha is a genus of fungi in the family Hyaloscyphaceae.

== Species ==
The genus contains over one hundred species:

- Hyaloscypha acerina Velen. (1934)
- Hyaloscypha acicularum (Velen.) Baral & Huhtinen (2009)
- Hyaloscypha acuminatula Svrček (1978)
- Hyaloscypha albocarpa Baral (2009)
- Hyaloscypha albohyalina (P. Karst.) Boud. (1907)
- Hyaloscypha albolutea (Pers.) Velen. (1934)
- Hyaloscypha amyloideopilosa Svrček (1983)
- Hyaloscypha atomaria (Starbäck) Nannf. (1932)
- Hyaloscypha aureliella (Nyl.) Huhtinen (1990)
- Hyaloscypha australis Dennis (1955)
- Hyaloscypha betularum Svrček (1982))
- Hyaloscypha betulina Velen. (1934)
- Hyaloscypha bicolor (Hambl. & Sigler) Vohník, Fehrer & Réblová (2018)
- Hyaloscypha bulbopilosa (Feltgen) Baral (2015)
- Hyaloscypha candidata (Cooke) Boud. (1907)
- Hyaloscypha capreolaria Velen. (1934)
- Hyaloscypha caricicola Crous & Osieck (2024)
- Hyaloscypha carnosa (Rodway) Spooner (1987)
- Hyaloscypha carnosula Velen. (1934)
- Hyaloscypha carpinacea Velen. (1934)
- Hyaloscypha ceracella (Fr.) Boud. (1907)
- Hyaloscypha cincinnata Sherwood (1974)
- Hyaloscypha cladii-marisci Svrček (1986)
- Hyaloscypha contorta Velen. (1934)
- Hyaloscypha cretacea Velen. (1934)
- Hyaloscypha cupularum Svrček (1987)
- Hyaloscypha cylindrispora Velen. (1934)
- Hyaloscypha daedaleae Velen. (1934)
- Hyaloscypha degenerans Velen. (1934)
- Hyaloscypha dennisii Bertault (1977)
- Hyaloscypha desmidiacea (Voglmayr) K. Yamag., Chuaseehar. & Nakagiri (2020)
- Hyaloscypha diabolica Huhtinen (1990)
- Hyaloscypha epilobii Velen. (1934)
- Hyaloscypha epiporia Huhtinen (1990)
- Hyaloscypha falcata Velen. (1934)
- Hyaloscypha farinacea (Cooke & Massee) Boud. (1907)
- Hyaloscypha finlandica (C.J.K. Wang & H.E. Wilcox) Vohník, Fehrer & Réblová (2018)
- Hyaloscypha flaveola (Cooke) Nannf. (1939)
- Hyaloscypha fuckelii Nannf. (1932)
- Hyaloscypha fuscostipitata (Graddon) Baral & Huhtinen (2009)
- Hyaloscypha gabretae Vohník & Réblová (2022)
- Hyaloscypha gryndleri Vohník & Réblová (2022)
- Hyaloscypha hederae Velen. (1934)
- Hyaloscypha hellebori Velen. (1934)
- Hyaloscypha hepaticicola (Grelet & Croz.) Baral, Huhtinen & J.R. De Sloover (2009)
- Hyaloscypha herbarum Velen. (1934)
- Hyaloscypha herbicola (Svrček) Korf (1978)
- Hyaloscypha himalayensis Arendh. & R. Sharma (1986)
- Hyaloscypha hyalina (Pers.) Boud. (1907)
- Hyaloscypha hyperici Velen. (1940)
- Hyaloscypha hypericicola Svrček (1978)
- Hyaloscypha incrustata Velen. (1934)
- Hyaloscypha intacta Svrček (1986)
- Hyaloscypha iridina Velen. (1934)
- Hyaloscypha japonensis (Tubaki) K. Yamag., Huhtinen, Hosoya, Chuaseehar. & Nakagiri (2020)
- Hyaloscypha lachnoides Velen. (1934)
- Hyaloscypha lacustris Velen. (1947)
- Hyaloscypha latispora Huhtinen (1990)
- Hyaloscypha leuconica (Cooke ex Stev.) Nannf. (1936)
- Hyaloscypha leucostigma (Fuckel) Baral (2020)
- Hyaloscypha lonchitidis Velen. (1934)
- Hyaloscypha longevestita Velen. (1934)
- Hyaloscypha luteola S. Ahmad (1978)
- Hyaloscypha luteopallida Svrček (1988)
- Hyaloscypha macrospora (Matsush.) K. Yamag., Chuaseehar. & Nakagiri (2020)
- Hyaloscypha mali Velen. (1940)
- Hyaloscypha martii Velen. (1934)
- Hyaloscypha melinii Vohník, Fehrer & Réblová (2018)
- Hyaloscypha microcarpa (Fuckel) Boud. (1907)
- Hyaloscypha microscopica Velen. (1934)
- Hyaloscypha microstoma (Wallr.) Boud. (1907)
- Hyaloscypha milliaria Velen. (1934)
- Hyaloscypha minima Velen. (1934)
- Hyaloscypha minuta (Spooner & Dennis) Baral (2015)
- Hyaloscypha mirabilis Velen. (1934)
- Hyaloscypha mollisiiformis Velen. (1934)
- Hyaloscypha monodictys (Hosoya & Huhtinen) J.G. Han, Hosoya, H.D. Shin (2014)
- Hyaloscypha occulta Huhtinen (1990)
- Hyaloscypha ochracea Velen. (1934)
- Hyaloscypha oenotherae Velen. (1934)
- Hyaloscypha oligospora Velen. (1934)
- Hyaloscypha opalina (Quél.) Boud. (1907)
- Hyaloscypha paludicola (Huhtinen) Raitv. (2004)
- Hyaloscypha parasitica (Ellis & Everh.) Sherwood (1977)
- Hyaloscypha parenchymatosa Velen. (1934)
- Hyaloscypha parvula (De Not.) Boud. (1907)
- Hyaloscypha pellucens (Sacc.) Boud. (1907)
- Hyaloscypha pellucida Velen. (1934)
- Hyaloscypha priapi Velen. (1934)
- Hyaloscypha protonematosa Velen. (1947)
- Hyaloscypha pusilla (O.F. Müll.) Boud. (1907)
- Hyaloscypha quercicola (Velen.) Huhtinen (1990)
- Hyaloscypha quercus Nannf. (1932)
- Hyaloscypha resinifera (Höhn.) Boud. (1907)
- Hyaloscypha rubi-fruticosi Svrček (1978)
- Hyaloscypha sarothamni Velen. (1934)
- Hyaloscypha secalina Velen. (1934)
- Hyaloscypha senilis Velen. (1934)
- Hyaloscypha sesleriae Velen. (1934)
- Hyaloscypha spinosae Velen. (1934)
- Hyaloscypha spinulosa (Beverw.) K. Yamag., Chuaseehar. & Nakagiri (2020)
- Hyaloscypha strobilicola Huhtinen (1990)
- Hyaloscypha substipitata Velen. (1947)
- Hyaloscypha subtilis Velen. (1934)
- Hyaloscypha sulphureopilosa Svrček (1986)
- Hyaloscypha tenuispora Velen. (1934)
- Hyaloscypha terrestris Velen. (1934)
- Hyaloscypha tiliae Velen. (1934)
- Hyaloscypha trapezispora Svrček (1988)
- Hyaloscypha typhacea Velen. (1934)
- Hyaloscypha ulmacea Velen. (1934)
- Hyaloscypha umbrina Velen. (1934)
- Hyaloscypha uncinata Arendh. & R. Sharma (1986)
- Hyaloscypha usitata Huhtinen (1990)
- Hyaloscypha variabilis (Hambl. & Sigler) Vohník), Fehrer & Réblová (2018)
- Hyaloscypha vitreola (P. Karst.) Boud. (1907)
- Hyaloscypha vraolstadiae (Hambl. & Sigler) Vohník, Fehrer & Réblová (2018)
- Hyaloscypha zalewskii Descals & J. Webster (1977)
