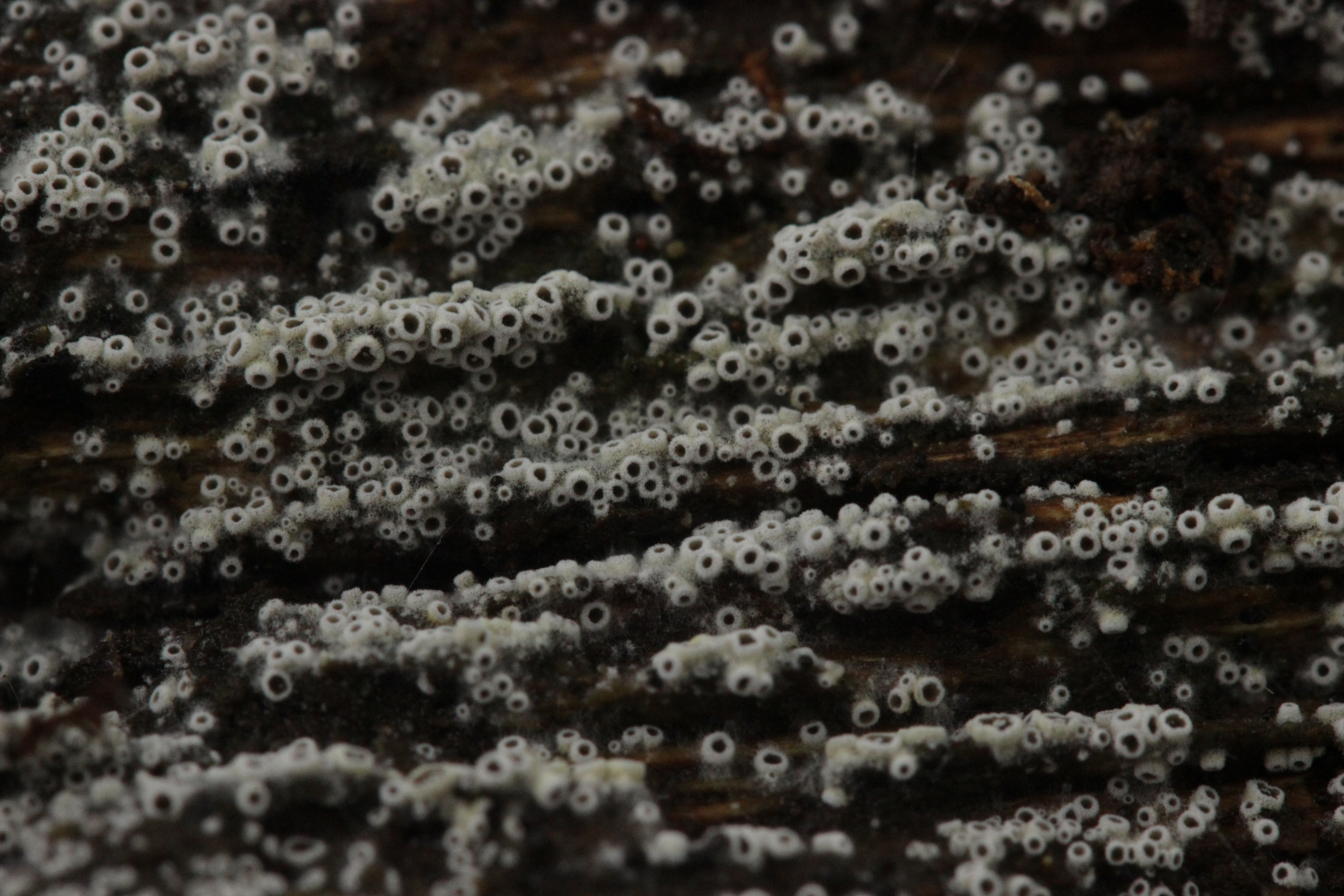
- Eriopezia caesia

Scientific classification
- Kingdom: Fungi
- Division: Ascomycota
- Class: Leotiomycetes
- Order: Helotiales
- Family: Hyaloscyphaceae
- Genus: Eriopezia (Sacc.) Rehm

Type species
- Eriopezia caesia (Pers.) Rehm

= Eriopezia =

Genus of fungi

Eriopezia is a genus of fungi within the Hyaloscyphaceae family. The genus contains about 30 species.
