= Austropezia =

Scientific classification
- Kingdom: Fungi
- Division: Ascomycota
- Class: Leotiomycetes
- Order: Helotiales
- Family: Hyaloscyphaceae
- Genus: Austropezia; Spooner
- Species: A. samuelsii

Binomial name
- Austropezia samuelsii (Korf) Spooner

Genus of fungi

Austropezia is a genus of fungi within the Hyaloscyphaceae family. This is a monotypic genus, containing the single species Austropezia samuelsii.
