= Leptomitales =

Scientific classification
- Domain: Eukaryota
- Clade: Sar
- Clade: Stramenopiles
- Phylum: Oomycota
- Class: Saprolegniomycetes
- Order: Leptomitales; Kanouse

Families
- Apodachlyellaceae; Ducellieriaceae; Leptolegniellaceae; Leptomitaceae

Order of single-celled organisms

Leptomitales are an order of water moulds within the class Oomycetes that contains the genus Apodachlya.
