= Trichophaea =

Scientific classification
- Domain: Eukaryota
- Kingdom: Fungi
- Division: Ascomycota
- Class: Pezizomycetes
- Order: Pezizales
- Family: Pyronemataceae
- Genus: Trichophaea; Boud. (1885)

Type species
- Peziza woolhopeia Cooke & W.Phillips (1877)

Species
- See text

Genus of fungi

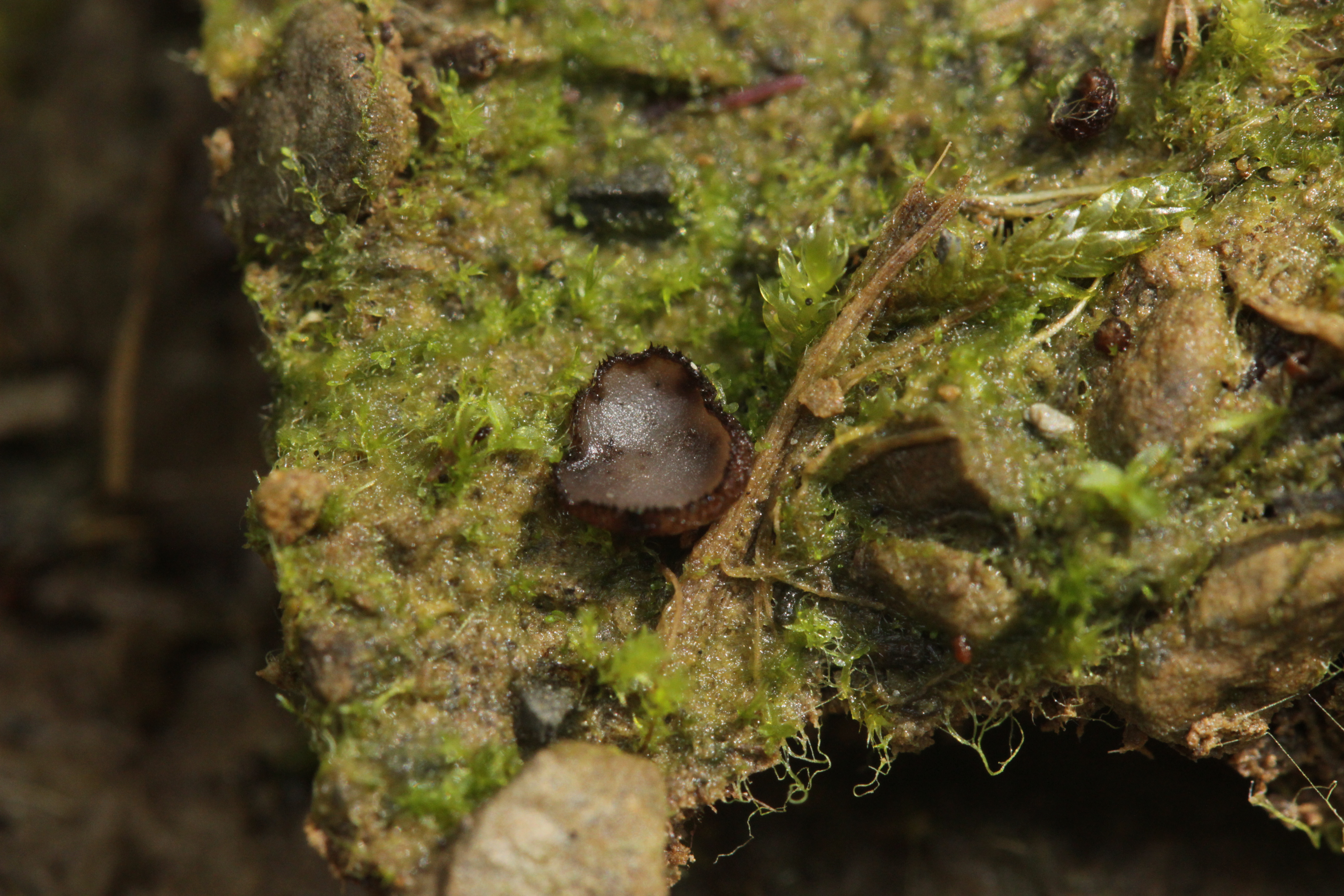

Trichophaea is a genus of fungi in the family Pyronemataceae. The genus was circumscribed in 1885 by French pharmacist Jean Louis Émile Boudier in 1885.

== Species ==
- Trichophaea abundans (P.Karst.) Boud. 1907
- Trichophaea affinis (Sacc.) Boud. 1907
- Trichophaea albospadicea (Grev.) Boud. 1907
- Trichophaea ampezzana (Rehm) Svrcek 1974
- Trichophaea amphidoxa (Rehm) Boud. 1907
- Trichophaea arctica Dissing 1981
- Trichophaea balnei (Starbäck) Boud. 1907
- Trichophaea bulbocrinita (W. Phillips) Boud. 1907
- Trichophaea bullata Kanouse 1958
- Trichophaea contradicta (Seaver) H.J. Larsen 1980
- Trichophaea cupulata D.C.Pant 1980
- Trichophaea dolosa (O.Weberb.) Boud. 1907
- Trichophaea donglingensis Zheng Wang 2001
- Trichophaea fimbriata (Quél.) Gamundí 1967
- Trichophaea geoporoides Korf & W.Y.Zhuang 1985
- Trichophaea glareosa (Velen.) Waraitch 1977
- Trichophaea gregaria (Rehm) Boud. 1907
- Trichophaea hazslinskya (Cooke) Boud. 1907
- Trichophaea hemisphaerioides (Mouton) Graddon 1960
- Trichophaea himalyaensis L.R.Batra 1961
- Trichophaea hybrida (Sowerby) T.Schumach. 1988
- Trichophaea laricina (Velen.) Svrcek 1977
- Trichophaea lecothecioides (Rehm) Boud. 1907
- Trichophaea livida (Schumach.) Boud. 1904
- Trichophaea lojkaeana (Rehm) Boud. 1907
- Trichophaea michiganensis Kanouse 1958
- Trichophaea minuta (Cain) Korf 1973
- Trichophaea mussooriensis (K.S.Thind, E.K.Cash & Sethi) L.R.Batra 1961
- Trichophaea narkandensis K.S.Thind & S.C.Kaushal 1980
- Trichophaea pallidibrunnea W.Y.Zhuang & Korf 1989
- Trichophaea paraphysincrustata Donadini, M.Torre & Calonge 1988
- Trichophaea pseudogregaria (Rick) Boud. 1907
- Trichophaea radhanagarensis S.D.Patil & M.S.Patil 1984
- Trichophaea rehmii (Jacz.) Boud. 1907
- Trichophaea saccata (H.C.Evans) Korf 1973
- Trichophaea salicina (Velen.) Svrcek 1977
- Trichophaea sphagni (Bong.) Boud. 1907
- Trichophaea subalpina Jamoni 1998
- Trichophaea sublivida (Sacc. & Speg.) Boud. 1907
- Trichophaea thuringiaca Benkert 2010
- Trichophaea tumidosa K.S. Thind & S.C.Kaushal 1980
- Trichophaea variornata Korf & W.Y.Zhuang 1991
- Trichophaea vernalis (Velen.) Svrcek 1977
- Trichophaea woolhopeia (Cooke & W.Phillips) Boud. 1885
