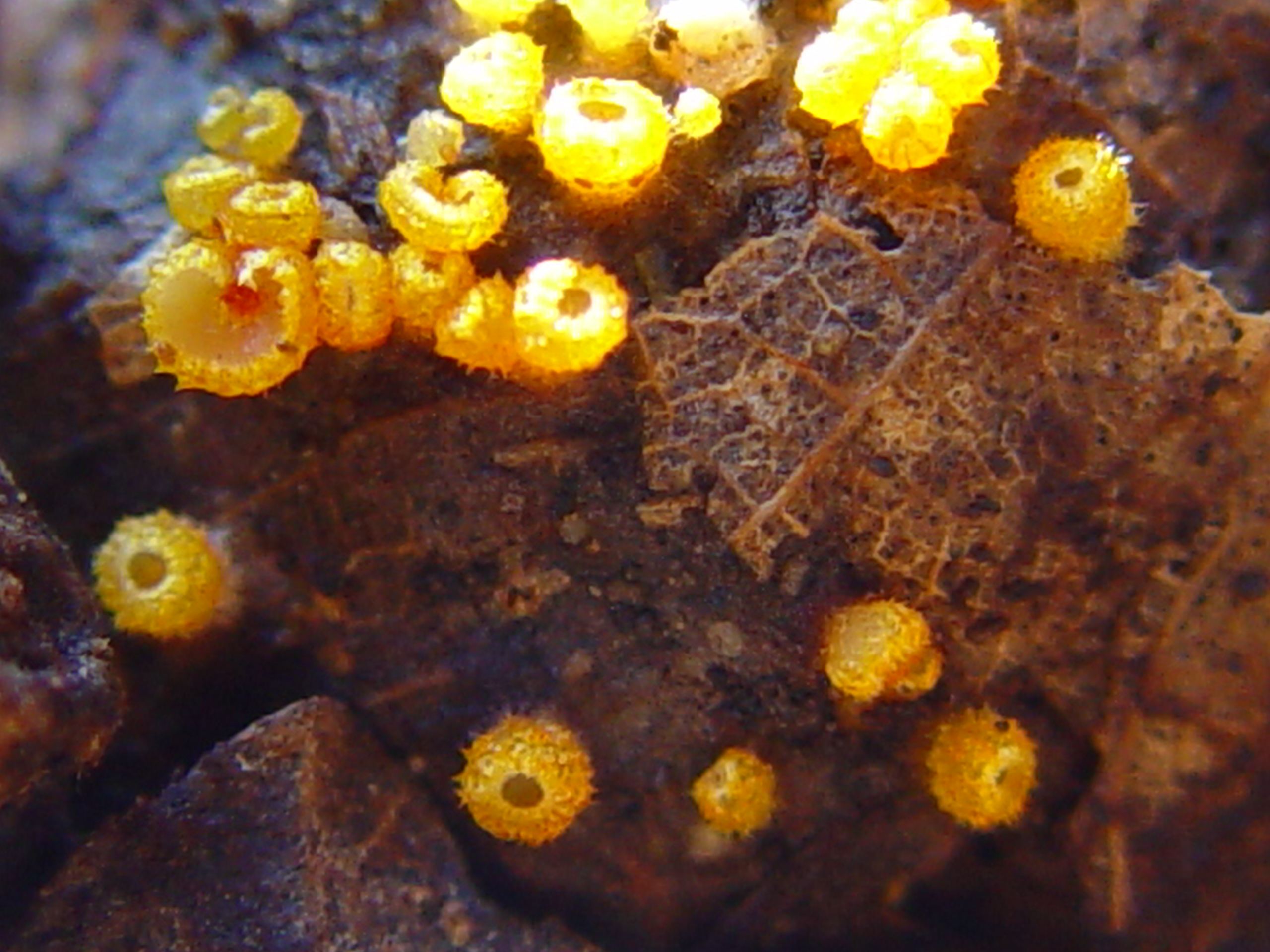
- Arachnopeziza aurelia

Scientific classification
- Kingdom: Fungi
- Division: Ascomycota
- Class: Leotiomycetes
- Order: Helotiales
- Family: Arachnopezizaceae
- Genus: Arachnopeziza; Fuckel

Type species
- Arachnopeziza aurelia (Pers.) Fuckel (1870)

= Arachnopeziza =

Genus of fungi

Arachnopeziza is a genus of fungi within the Hyaloscyphaceae family. The genus contains 15 species.
