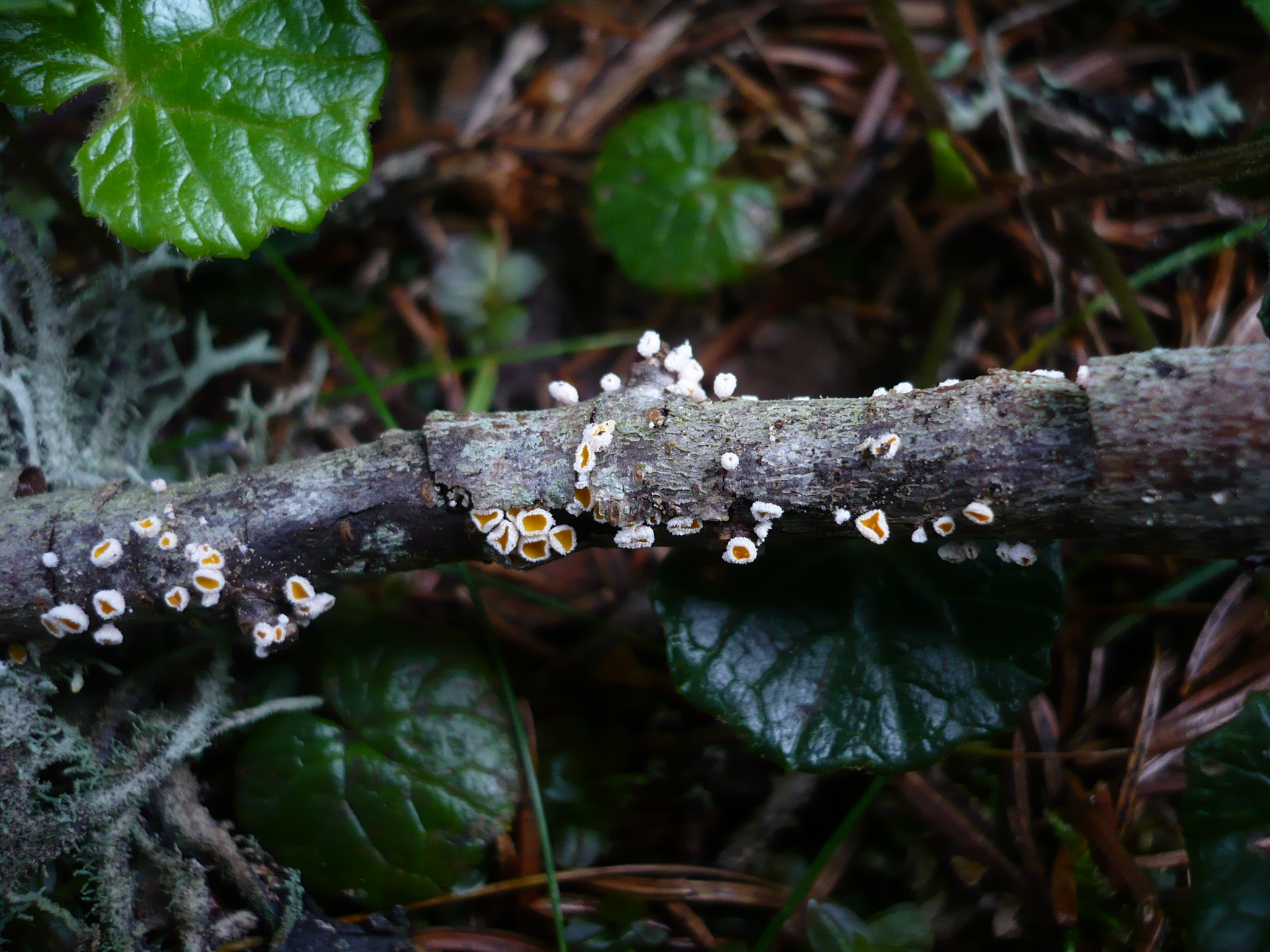
- Lachnum bicolor

Scientific classification
- Kingdom: Fungi
- Division: Ascomycota
- Class: Leotiomycetes
- Order: Helotiales
- Family: Lachnaceae
- Genus: Lachnum; Retz. (1779)

Type species
- Lachnum agaricinum Retz. (1795)

= Lachnum =

Genus of fungi

Lachnum is a genus of fungi in the family Lachnaceae. The genus contains about 251 species. It was circumscribed by Swedish botanist Anders Jahan Retzius in 1795.

== Species ==
- L. abnorme
- L. acerinum
- L. agaricinum
- L. apalum (rush disco)
- L. barbatum
- L. berggrenii
- L. bicolor
- L. brevipilosum
- L. brevipilum
- L. britzelmayrionum
- L. callimorphum
- L. calycioides
- L. capitatum
- L. caricis
- L. carneolum
- L. clandestinum
- L. clavigerum
- L. clavisporum
- L. coeruleoalbum
- L. controversum
- L. correae
- L. corticale
- L. cruciferum
- L. crystallinum
- L. deflexum
- L. diminutum
- L. echinulatum
- L. elongatisporum
- L. enzenspergerianum
- L. fasciculare
- L. flavofuligineum
- L. fuscescens
- L. hyalopus
- L. imbecille
- L. juncinum
- L. lachnoides
- L. lanariceps
- L. latebricola
- L. luteovinosum
- L. luzulinum
- L. melanophthalmum
- L. nipponicum
- L. nothofagi
- L. nudipes
- L. palearum
- L. palmae
- L. papyraceum
- L. perplexum
- L. pritzelianum
- L. pseudolachnum
- L. pteridicola
- L. pteridophyllum
- L. pudibundum
- L. pulchellum
- L. pulverulentum
- L. pygmaeum
- L. radotinense
- L. rehmii
- L. rhodoleucum
- L. rhytismatis
- L. roridum
- L. salicariae
- L. sesleriae
- L. soppittii
- L. spadiceum
- L. subnudipes
- L. sulphureum
- L. tenuissimum
- L. trapeziforme
- L. varians
- L. virgineum
- L. willisii
