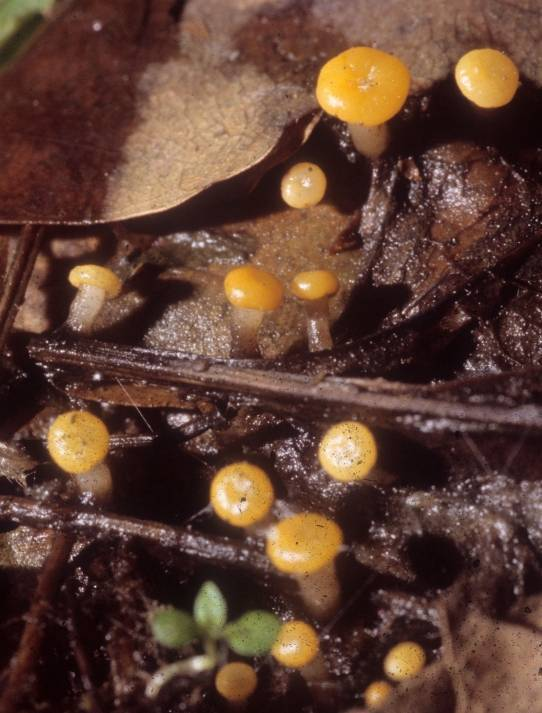
- Vibrissea truncorum

Scientific classification
- Kingdom: Fungi
- Division: Ascomycota
- Class: Leotiomycetes
- Order: Helotiales
- Family: Vibrisseaceae; Korf (1990)

Type genus
- Vibrissea Fr. (1822)

Genera
- Acephala Grünig & T.N.Sieber; Anavirga B.C.Sutton, 1975; Apostemidium (P.Karst.) P.Karst.; Cheirospora Moug. & Fr.; Chlorovibrissea L.M.Kohn, 1989; Diplococcium; Fuscosclera; Gorgoniceps (P.Karst.) P.Karst.; Leucovibrissea (A.Sánchez) Korf; Pocillum De Not.; Strossmayeria Schulzer; Vibrissea Fr., 1822

= Vibrisseaceae =

Family of fungi

The Vibrisseaceae are a family of fungi in the order Helotiales. The family was circumscribed by mycologist Richard P. Korf in 1990 to include the genera Vibrissea, Chlorovibrissea, and Leucovibrissea. According to the Dictionary of the Fungi (10th edition, 2008), the family encompasses 5 genera and 59 species.

== Description ==
Members of the Vibrisseaceae have filiform (threadlike) to cylindrical ascospores.
