= Andersonia carinata =

Conservation status
- Priority Two — Poorly Known Taxa (DEC)

Scientific classification
- Kingdom: Plantae
- Clade: Tracheophytes
- Clade: Angiosperms
- Clade: Eudicots
- Clade: Asterids
- Order: Ericales
- Family: Ericaceae
- Genus: Andersonia
- Species: A. carinata

Binomial name
- Andersonia carinata L.Watson

Species of flowering plant

Andersonia carinata is a species of flowering plant in the family Ericaceae and is endemic to the south-west of Western Australia. It is an erect shrub with more or less egg-shaped leaves with a keeled base, and pink, pinkish-white or pinkish-purple flowers.

== Description ==
Andersonia carinata is a slender, erect shrub that typically grows to a height of up to 10–45 cm (3.9–17.7 in). Its leaves are more or less egg-shaped, 2–4 mm (0.079–0.157 in) long and 0.5–1 mm (0.020–0.039 in) wide with a keeled base. The flowers are arranged in groups of six to twelve with leaf-like bracts and shorter, keeled bracteoles. The sepals are oblong to lance-shaped, 4–6 mm (0.16–0.24 in) long and usually hairy. The petals are pink, pinkish-white or pinkish-purple and form a tube with lobes about half as long as the petal tube. The stamens are as long as the petal tube, the anthers about 1.5 mm (0.059 in) long and usually more than half as long as the filaments.

== Taxonomy ==
Andersonia carinata was first formally described in 1962 by Leslie Watson in the Kew Bulletin from specimens collected on sandy plains near Duggan in 1952. The specific epithet (carinata) means 'keeled', referring to the bracteoles.

== Distribution and habitat ==
This species of Andersonia grows in sand and lateritic soils on plains in the Avon Wheatbelt, Esperance Plains and Mallee bioregions of south-western Western Australia.

== Conservation status ==
Andersonia carinata is listed as "Priority Two" by the Government of Western Australia Department of Biodiversity, Conservation and Attractions, meaning that it is poorly known and from one or a few locations.
