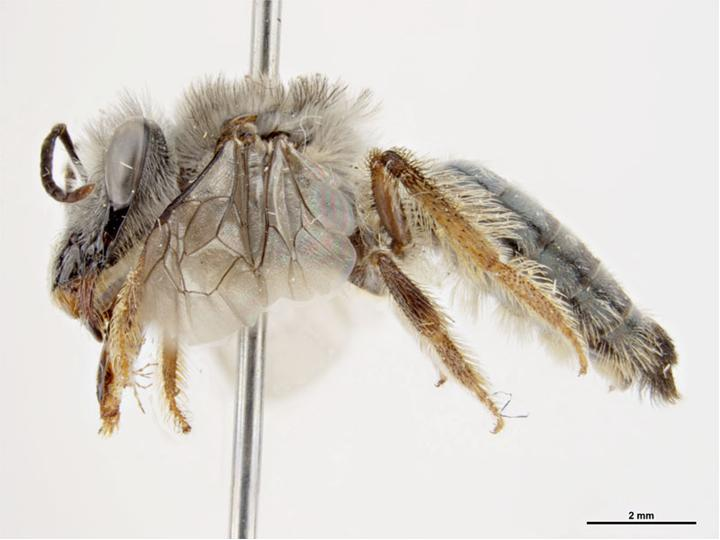
- Female

Scientific classification
- Kingdom: Animalia
- Phylum: Arthropoda
- Clade: Pancrustacea
- Class: Insecta
- Order: Hymenoptera
- Family: Colletidae
- Genus: Leioproctus
- Species: L. macmillani

Binomial name
- Leioproctus macmillani Houston, 1991

= Leioproctus macmillani =

Species of bee

Leioproctus macmillani, or Leioproctus (Leioproctus) macmillani, is a species of bee in the family Colletidae and subfamily Colletinae. It is endemic to Australia. It was described by Australian entomologist Terry Houston in 1991.

== Etymology ==
The specific epithet macmillani honours R.P. McMillan, who collected the first specimens.

== Description ==
The male holotype body length is 9.0 mm, head width 3.1 mm; female paratype body length 12 mm, head width 3.55 mm. Integumental colouration is mainly black, with some blue-green on the metasoma; the hair is grey to golden, brown and black.

== Distribution and habitat ==
The species occurs in south-west Western Australia on the coastal plain north of Perth and the area around Jurien Bay and Leeman. The type locality is Gnangara State Forest some 20 km north of Perth.

== Behaviour ==
The adults are flying mellivores. Flowering plants visited by the bees include Styphelia xerophylla and Andersonia heterophylla.

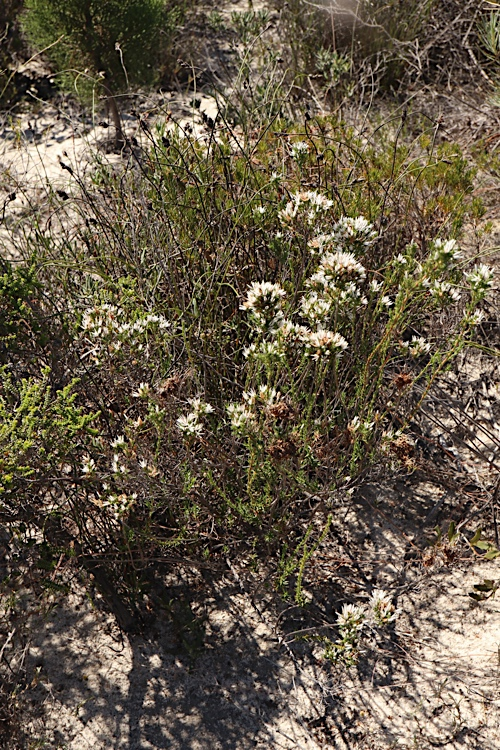
Andersonia heterophylla, a forage plant of the bees

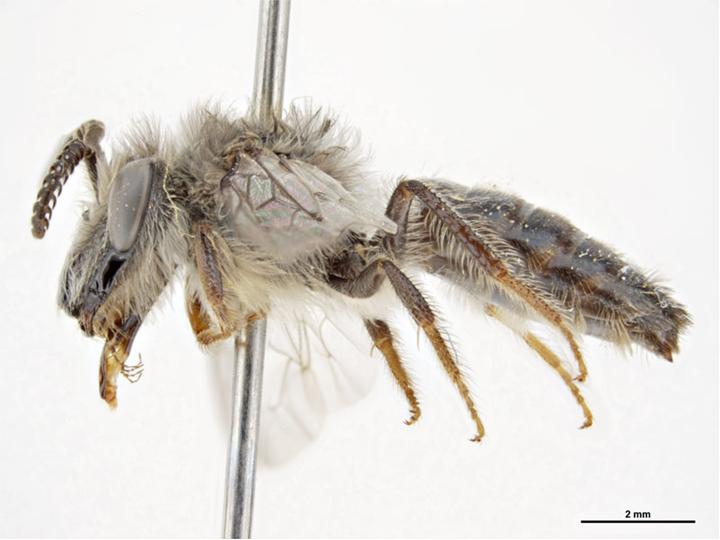
Male
