= Andersonia barbata =

Conservation status
- Priority Two — Poorly Known Taxa (DEC)

Scientific classification
- Kingdom: Plantae
- Clade: Tracheophytes
- Clade: Angiosperms
- Clade: Eudicots
- Clade: Asterids
- Order: Ericales
- Family: Ericaceae
- Genus: Andersonia
- Species: A. barbata

Binomial name
- Andersonia barbata L.Watson

Synonyms
- Andersonia caerulea var. stricta Benth.

Species of flowering plant

Andersonia barbata is a species of flowering plant in the family Ericaceae and is endemic to the south-west of Western Australia. It is an erect shrub with slightly twisted, lance-shaped leaves, and blue flowers.

== Description ==
Andersonia barbata is an erect shrub that typically grows to a height of up to about 40 cm (16 in). Its leaves are slightly twisted, lance-shaped, 4–28 mm (0.16–1.10 in) long and 1–2 mm (0.039–0.079 in) wide. The bracteoles are linear, shorter than the sepals. The sepals are linear, 8–16 mm (0.31–0.63 in) long, usually hairy and pink. The petals are blue and slightly shorter than the sepals, with lobes about as long as the petal tube. The stamens are about as long as the petals with anthers about half as long as the filaments.

== Taxonomy ==
Andersonia barbata was first formally described in 1962 by Leslie Watson in the Kew Bulletin from specimens collected near the Vasse River in 1900. The specific epithet (barbata) means 'bearded'.

== Distribution and habitat ==
This species of Andersonia grows in swampy areas in the Jarrah Forest, Swan Coastal Plain and Warren bioregions in south-western Western Australia where it grows in sand.

== Conservation status ==
Andersonia barbata is listed as "Priority Two" by the Government of Western Australia Department of Biodiversity, Conservation and Attractions, meaning that it is poorly known and from one or a few locations.
