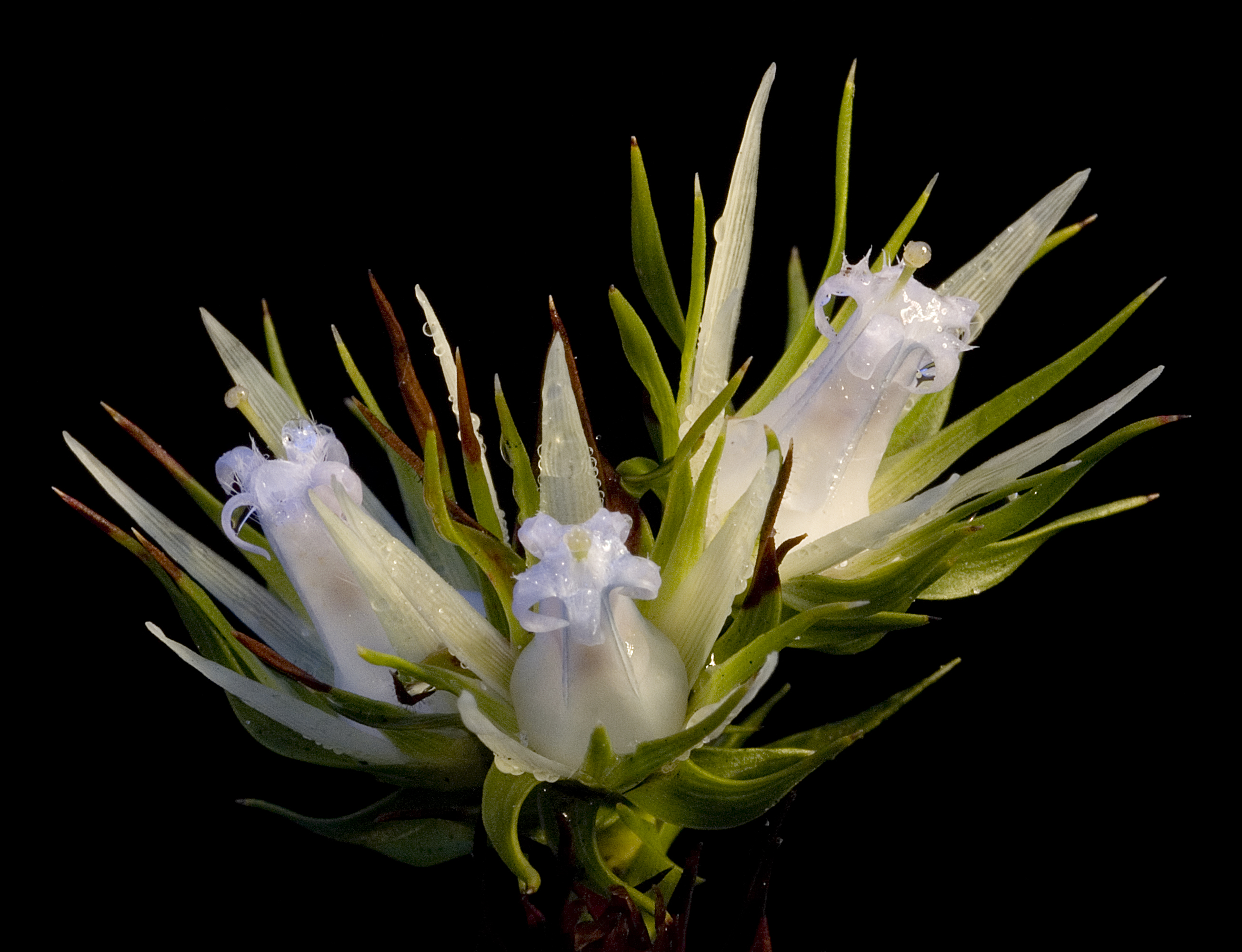

Scientific classification
- Kingdom: Plantae
- Clade: Tracheophytes
- Clade: Angiosperms
- Clade: Eudicots
- Clade: Asterids
- Order: Ericales
- Family: Ericaceae
- Subfamily: Epacridoideae
- Tribe: Cosmelieae
- Genus: Andersonia; R.Br.

Synonyms
- Andersonia R.Br. sect. Andersonia; Andersonia sect. Atherocephala (DC.) Sond.; Andersonia sect. Euandersonia Sond. nom. inval.; Antherocephala B.D.Jacks. orth. var.; Atherocephala DC.; Homalostoma Stschegl.; Sphincterostoma Stschegl.; Sprengelia sect. Andersonia (R.Br.) Kuntze; Sprengelia subg. Andersonia (R.Br.) Drude

= Andersonia (plant) =

Genus of flowering plants

Andersonia is a genus of mostly small, evergreen shrubs in the family Ericaceae and is endemic to the Southwest Botanical Province in Western Australia.

== Description ==
Plants in the genus Andersonia are small shrubs, (apart from A. axilliflora and A. echinocephala that grow to a height of several metres) some are subshrubs and a few, compact cushion plants, but all seem to require a fairly open habitat. The leaves resemble those of monocotyledons in having a sheathing leaf base and parallel leaf veins, although the veins arise from a single trace in the base of the leaf. The leaves are spirally arranged and overlap at the base and increase in size, upwards from the base of the stem, but vary greatly in size and shape. The flowers are erect, usually brightly coloured and conspicuous, the five sepals egg-shaped to linear and often similarly coloured to the petals. The petals are joined at the base, forming a bell-shaped to cylindrical tube with five lobes that are shorter than the tube. The species differ from the similar Cosmelia rubra in having their stamen filaments free from the petal tube, and from Styphelia in having the petal tube softy-hairy inside, the petal tube longer than the lobes.

== Taxonomy ==
The genus Andersonia was first formally described in 1810 by Robert Brown in his Prodromus Florae Novae Hollandiae. The genus name, Andersonia, jointly honours William Anderson, naval surgeon and naturalist, who accompanied Cook on several voyages, Alexander Anderson, curator of the botanic garden at Saint Vincent, and William Anderson, curator of the Apothecaries' Garden at Chelsea.

=== Species list ===
The following is a list of Andersonia species accepted by the Australian Plant Census as of October 2022:

- Andersonia annelsii Lemson
- Andersonia aristata Lindl.
- Andersonia auriculata L.Watson
- Andersonia axilliflora (Stschegl.) Druce
- Andersonia barbata L.Watson
- Andersonia bifida L.Watson
- Andersonia brevifolia Sond.
- Andersonia caerulea R.Br.
- Andersonia carinata L.Watson
- Andersonia depressa R.Br.
- Andersonia echinocephala (Stschegl.) Druce
- Andersonia ferricola Lemson
- Andersonia geniculata Lemson
- Andersonia gracilis DC.
- Andersonia grandiflora Stschegl.
- Andersonia hammersleyana Lemson
- Andersonia heterophylla Sond.
- Andersonia involucrata Sond.
- Andersonia latiflora (F.Muell.) Benth.
- Andersonia lehmanniana Sond.
- Andersonia longifolia (Benth.) L.Watson
- Andersonia macranthera F.Muell.
- Andersonia micrantha R.Br.
- Andersonia parvifolia R.Br.
- Andersonia pinaster Lemson
- Andersonia redolens Lemson
- Andersonia setifolia Benth.
- Andersonia simplex (Stschegl.) Druce
- Andersonia sprengelioides R.Br.
