= Andersonia auriculata =

Conservation status
- Priority Three — Poorly Known Taxa (DEC)

Scientific classification
- Kingdom: Plantae
- Clade: Tracheophytes
- Clade: Angiosperms
- Clade: Eudicots
- Clade: Asterids
- Order: Ericales
- Family: Ericaceae
- Genus: Andersonia
- Species: A. auriculata

Binomial name
- Andersonia auriculata L.Watson

Species of flowering plant

Andersonia auriculata is a species of flowering plant in the family Ericaceae and is endemic to southern Western Australia. It is an erect or spreading shrub with twisted lance-shaped leaves and white or blue flowers.

== Description ==
Andersonia auriculata is an erect or spreading shrub that typically grows to a height of 10–30 cm (3.9–11.8 in). Its leaves are spreading, twisted lance-shaped, 5–15 mm (0.20–0.59 in) long and 1–3 mm (0.039–0.118 in) wide. The bracteoles on the higher flowers are sepal-like and sometimes longer than the sepals. The sepals are lance-shaped, 10–17 mm (0.39–0.67 in) long and greenish white. The petals are shorter than the sepals, white or blue with lobes about twice as long as the petal tube. The stamens are half as long as the petals with anthers about 2.5 mm (0.098 in) long.

== Taxonomy ==
Andersonia auriculata was first formally described in 1962 by Leslie Watson in the Kew Bulletin from specimens collected at Quarram in 1953. The specific epithet (auriculata) means 'having auricles', referring to the stamens.

== Distribution and habitat ==
This species of Andersonia grows in sandy in swampy areas or granite outcrops in the Jarrah Forest and Warren bioregions of southern Western Australia.

== Conservation status ==
Andersonia auriculata is listed as "Priority Three" by the Government of Western Australia Department of Biodiversity, Conservation and Attractions, meaning that it is poorly known and known from only a few locations but is not under imminent threat.
