= Tennantia =

Scientific classification
- Kingdom: Plantae
- Clade: Tracheophytes
- Clade: Angiosperms
- Clade: Eudicots
- Clade: Asterids
- Order: Gentianales
- Family: Rubiaceae
- Genus: Tennantia; Verdc.

Synonyms
- Tricalysia sennii Chiov.; Xeromphis keniensis Tennant

Genus of flowering plants

Tennantia is a monotypic genus of flowering plants belonging to the family Rubiaceae. It only contains one known species, Tennantia sennii (Chiov.) Verdc. & Bridson

== Description ==
It is a shrub, 1–3 m (3 ft 3 in – 9 ft 10 in) tall, with whitish stems that are puberulous when young. The leaf-blades are elliptic to narrowly obovate in shape. They are 1–6.5 cm (0–3 in) long and 0.5–2.9 cm (0–1 in) wide. With rounded and sometimes minutely apiculate at the apex, glabrous or puberulous; stipules are 1–3 mm (0–0 in) long. Calyx with limb-tube about 1.2 mm (0 in) long, with lobes about 0.8 mm (0 in) long. The corolla is white or tinged pink; with the perianth tube 1.5–2 mm (0–0 in) long; the lobes are about 5 mm (0 in) long. The fruit (or seed capsule) is black, 5–6 mm (0–0 in) in diameter and glabrous. The seeds are about 4 mm (0 in) long.

Its native range is from Somalia to Kenya and Tanzania in eastern Tropical Africa.

The genus name of Tennantia is in honour of James Robert Tennant (b. 1928), a British botanist working at Kew Gardens. The Latin specific epithet of sennii honors Lorenzo Senni (1879 - 1954), an Italian botanist who collected the type specimen. Both the genus and the species were first described and published in Kew Bull. Vol.36 on page 511 in 1981.
