= Andersonia longifolia =

Conservation status
- Priority Two — Poorly Known Taxa (DEC)

Scientific classification
- Kingdom: Plantae
- Clade: Tracheophytes
- Clade: Angiosperms
- Clade: Eudicots
- Clade: Asterids
- Order: Ericales
- Family: Ericaceae
- Genus: Andersonia
- Species: A. longifolia

Binomial name
- Andersonia longifolia (Benth.) L.Watson

Synonyms
- Andersonia latiflora var. longifolia Benth.

Species of flowering plant

Andersonia longifolia is a species of flowering plant in the family Ericaceae and is endemic to a restricted area in the south-west of Western Australia. It is a sprawling to upright shrub with pointed lance-shaped leaves and cream-coloured flowers.

== Description ==
Andersonia longifolia is a sprawling to upright shrub that typically grows to a height of 10–60 cm (3.9–23.6 in). Its leaves are lance-shaped with a pointed tip, 3–17 mm (0.12–0.67 in) long, 1–5 mm (0.039–0.197 in) wide, more or less twisted and wavy and usually grooved. The flowers are arranged in oblong clusters, often with more than twenty flowers, with keeled bracteoles half as long as the sepals. The sepals are 10–15 mm (0.39–0.59 in) long, the petals cream-coloured, forming a tube with bearded lobes about as long as the petal tube.

== Taxonomy ==
This species was first formally described in 1868 by George Bentham who gave it the name Andersonia latiflora var. longifolia in his Flora Australiensis from specimens collected by James Drummond. In 1962, Leslie Watson raised the variety to species status as Andersonia longifolia in the Kew Bulletin. The specific epithet (longifolia) means 'long-leaved'.

== Distribution and habitat ==
This species of Andersonia grows in sandy loam on breakaways and ridges south of Busselton in the Jarrah Forest bioregion of south-western Western Australiai.

== Conservation status ==
Andersonia longifolia is listed as "Priority Two" by the Government of Western Australia Department of Biodiversity, Conservation and Attractions, meaning that it is poorly known and from one or a few locations.
