= Grovesia =

Scientific classification
- Kingdom: Fungi
- Division: Ascomycota
- Class: Leotiomycetes
- Order: Helotiales
- Family: Helotiaceae
- Genus: Grovesia; Dennis

Type species
- Grovesia pulchella Dennis

Genus of fungi

Grovesia is a genus of fungi in the family Helotiaceae. This is a monotypic genus, containing the single species Grovesia pulchella.

The genus name of Grovesia is in honour of James Walton Groves (1906-1970), who was a Canadian mycologist.

The genus was circumscribed by Richard William George Dennis in Kew Bull. vol.14 on page 444 in 1960.
