= Andersonia bifida =

Conservation status
- Priority Two — Poorly Known Taxa (DEC)

Scientific classification
- Kingdom: Plantae
- Clade: Tracheophytes
- Clade: Angiosperms
- Clade: Eudicots
- Clade: Asterids
- Order: Ericales
- Family: Ericaceae
- Genus: Andersonia
- Species: A. bifida

Binomial name
- Andersonia bifida L.Watson

Species of flowering plant

Andersonia bifida is a species of flowering plant in the family Ericaceae and is endemic to the south-west of Western Australia. It is a compact shrub with linear leaves with a sheathing base, and white, cream-coloured or yellow flowers.

== Description ==
Andersonia bifida is a compact shrub that typically grows to a height of up to about 30 cm (12 in). Its leaves are linear with a sheathing base, 2–4 mm (0.079–0.157 in) long and 0.5–1 mm (0.020–0.039 in) wide. The flowers are arranged in groups of 2 to 6 with bracts similar to the leaves and shorter, keeled bracteoles. The sepals are linear, 8–16 mm (0.31–0.63 in) long and usually hairy. The petals are white, cream-coloured or yellow, 2.5–4.5 mm (0.098–0.177 in) long and form a tube with lobes about half as long as the petal tube. The stamens are slightly longer than the petal tube, the anthers equal in length or longer than the filaments.

== Taxonomy ==
Andersonia bifida was first formally described in 1962 by Leslie Watson in the Kew Bulletin from specimens collected by Arthur Dorrien-Smith in 1910. The specific epithet (bifida) means 'forked', referring to the anthers.

== Distribution and habitat ==
This species of Andersonia grows in loamy soils on granite outcrops in the Avon Wheatbelt and Jarrah Forest bioregions of south-western Western Australia.

== Conservation status ==
Andersonia bifida is listed as "Priority Two" by the Government of Western Australia Department of Biodiversity, Conservation and Attractions, meaning that it is poorly known and from one or a few locations.
