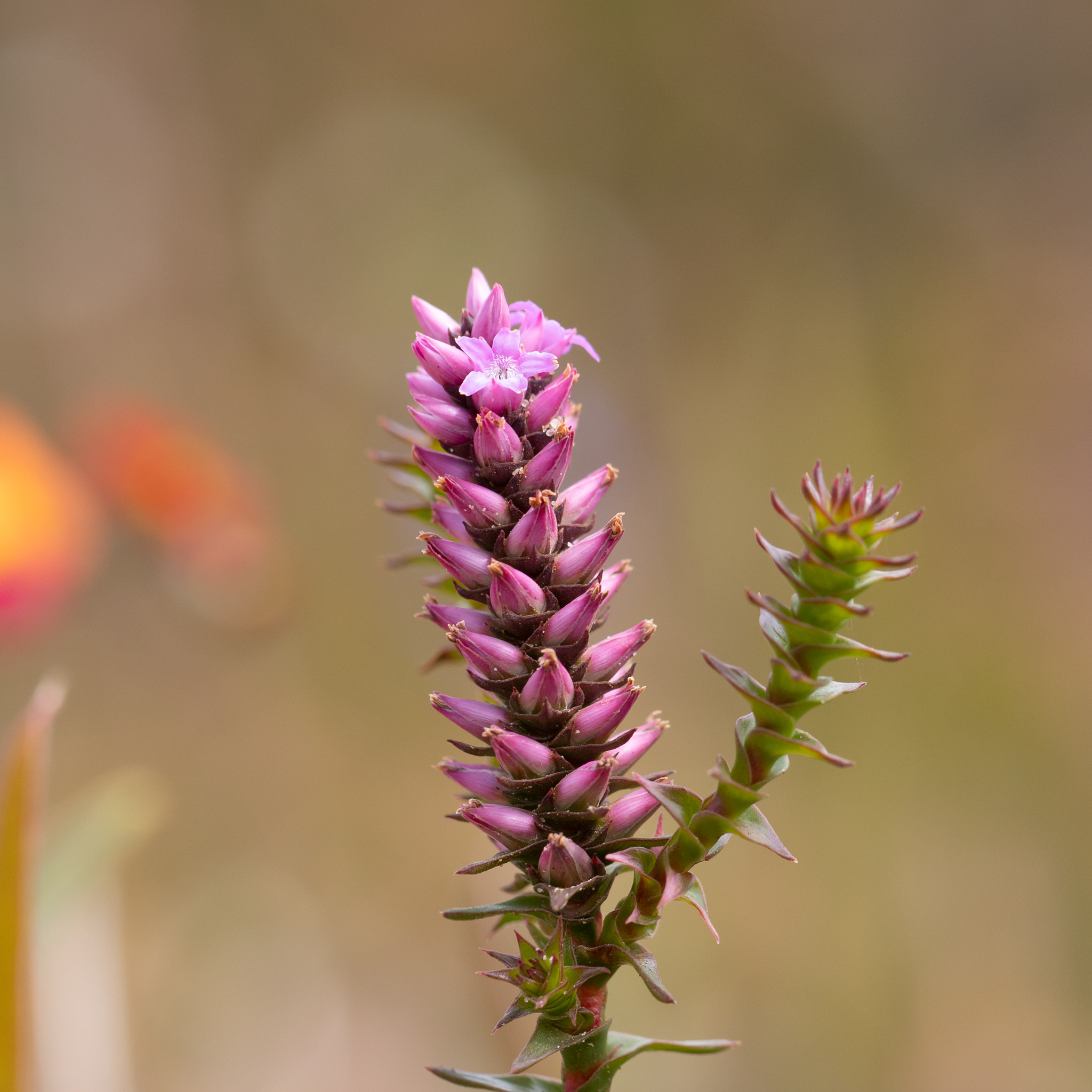
- Near Toolbrunup

Scientific classification
- Kingdom: Plantae
- Clade: Embryophytes
- Clade: Tracheophytes
- Clade: Angiosperms
- Clade: Eudicots
- Clade: Asterids
- Order: Ericales
- Family: Ericaceae
- Genus: Andersonia
- Species: A. simplex

Binomial name
- Andersonia simplex (Stschegl.) Druce

Synonyms
- Andersonia homalostoma Benth. nom. illeg., nom. superfl.; Andersonia homatostoma B.D.Jacks. orth. var.; Homalostoma simplex Stschegl.; Sprengelia homalostoma (Benth.) F.Muell. nom. illeg., nom. superfl.

= Andersonia simplex =

Species of flowering plant

Andersonia simplex, commonly known as spiked andersonia, is a species of flowering plant in the family Ericaceae and is endemic to the south of Western Australia. It is an erect or ascending shrub, usually with ascending branches, pointed lance-shaped or egg-shaped, sometimes twisted, wavy leaves, and pink and blue, purple or reddish-purple flowers.

== Description ==
Andersonia simplex is an erect or ascending, scaly shrub that typically grows to a height of 10–60 cm (3.9–23.6 in). Its leaves are pointed lance-shaped, sometimes twisted and wavy, mostly 3–8 mm (0.12–0.31 in) long and 2–3 mm (0.079–0.118 in) wide. Sometimes the leaves are egg-shaped and not twisted. The flowers are arranged in groups on the ends of branches in compact, spike-like groups of more than twenty, with leaf-like bracts and boat-shaped bracteoles half as long as the sepals. The sepals are broadly lance-shaped, mostly 2–4 mm (0.079–0.157 in) long and usually hairy. The petals are pink and blue, purple or reddish-purple, forming a tube almost as long as the sepals, with lobes about long as the petal tube and bearded inside. The stamens are 1–3 mm (0.039–0.118 in) long, about the same length as the petal tube, the anthers about half as long as the filaments.

== Taxonomy ==
Andersonia simplex was first formally described in 1859 by Sergei Sergeyevich Sheglejev, who gave it the name Homalostoma simplex in the Bulletin de la Société impériale des naturalistes de Moscou from specimens collected by James Drummond. In 1917, George Claridge Druce transferred the species to Andersonia as A. simplex in a supplement to The Botanical Exchange Club and Society of the British Isles Report for 1916. The specific epithet (simplex) means 'simple', referring to the undivided stem.

== Distribution and habitat ==
This species of Andersonia grows in a sandy and gravelly soils north of Albany to the Stirling Range National Park, in the Avon Wheatbelt, Esperance Plains and Jarrah Forest bioregions of southern Western Australia.

== Conservation status ==
Andersonia simplex is listed as "not threatened" by the Government of Western Australia Department of Biodiversity, Conservation and Attractions.

Andersonia simplex

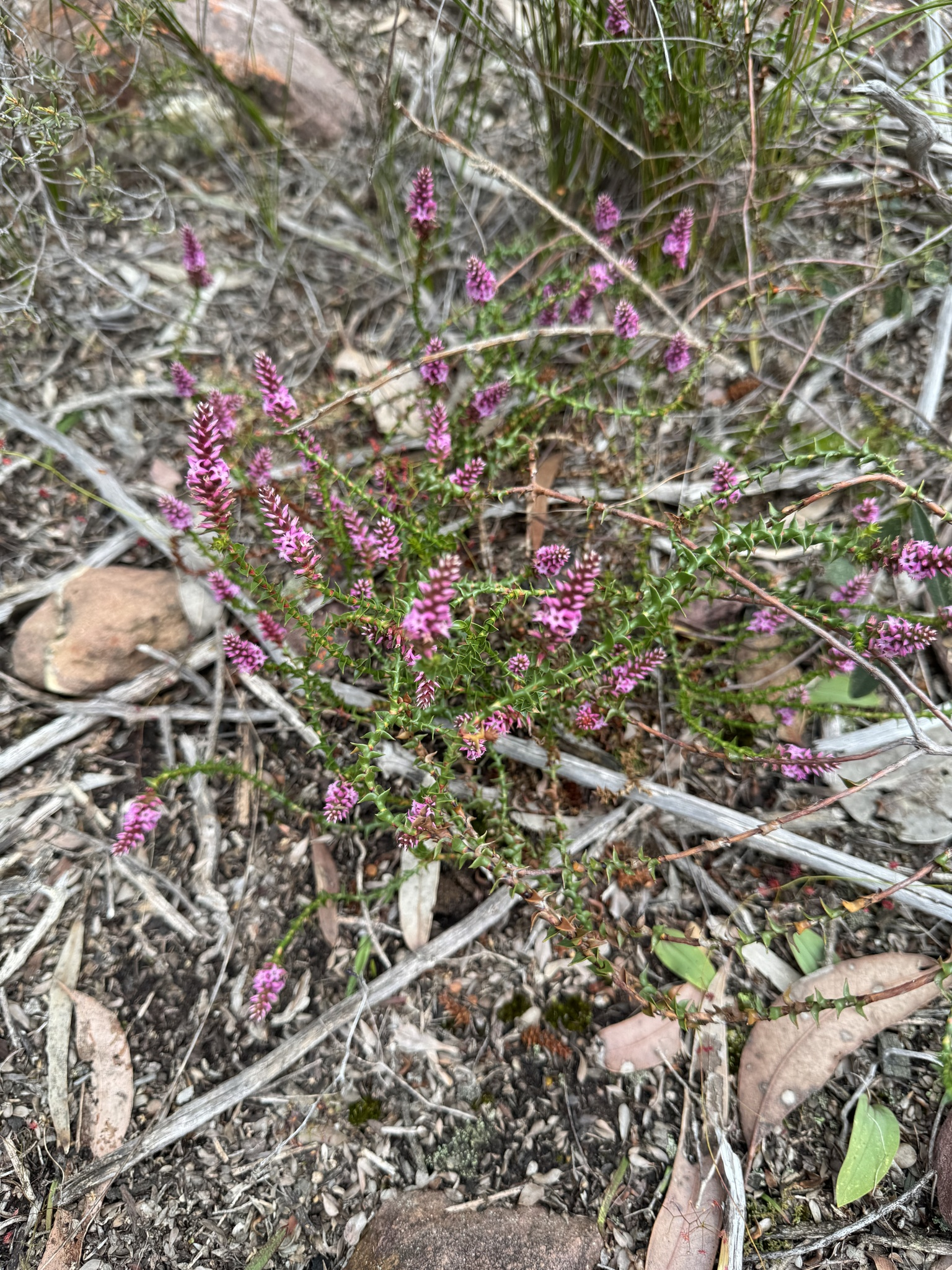
Habit

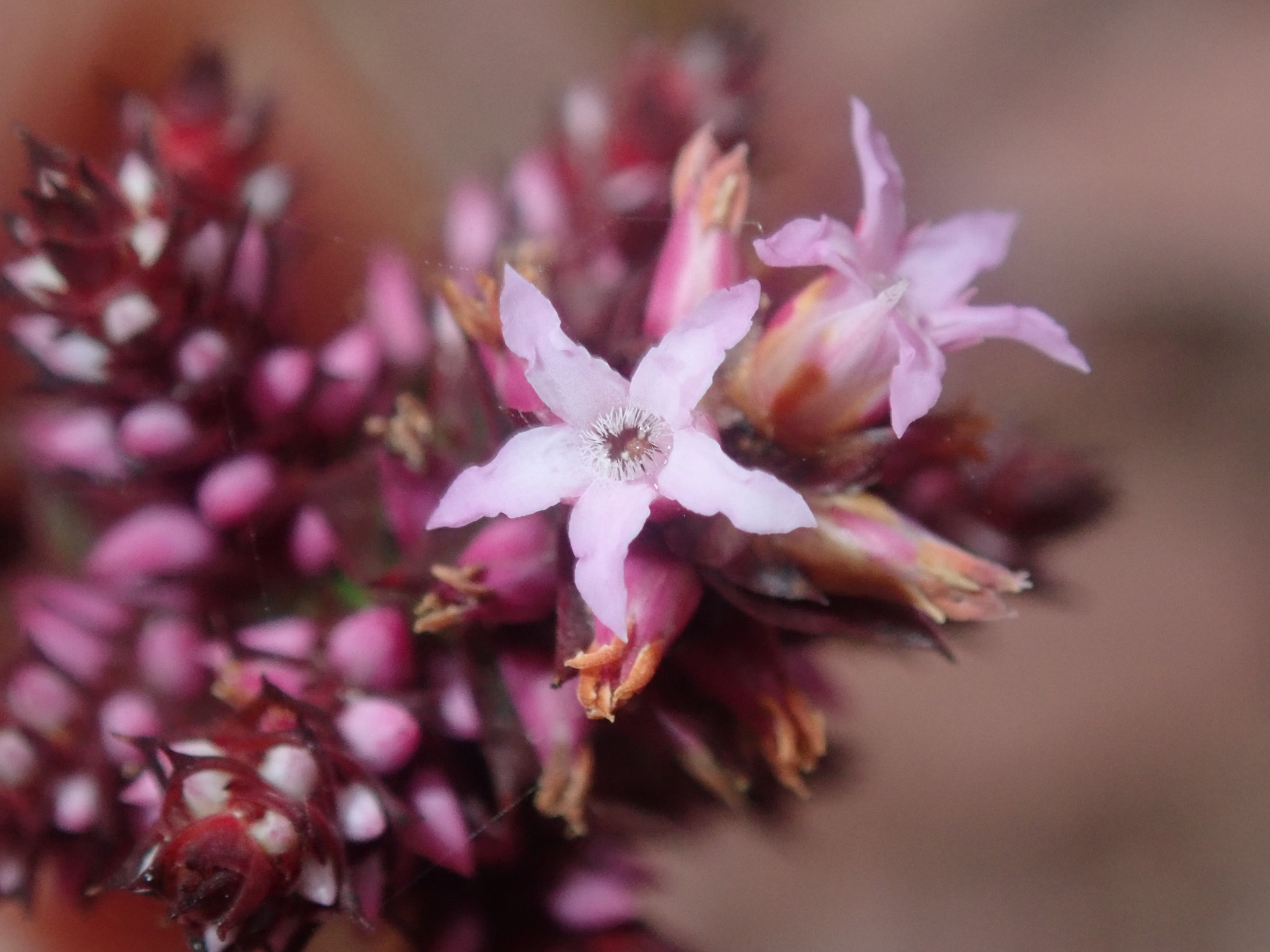

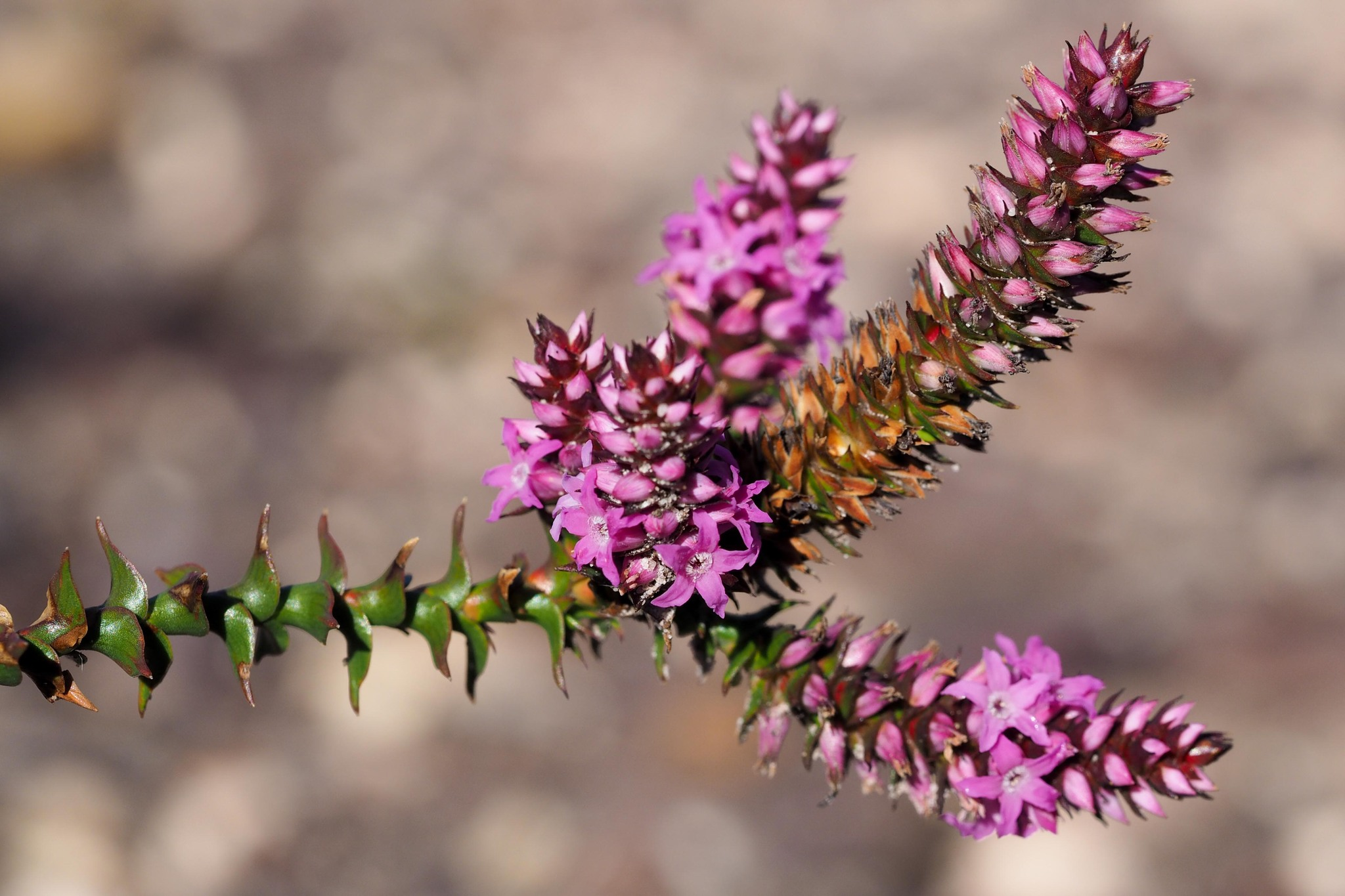
