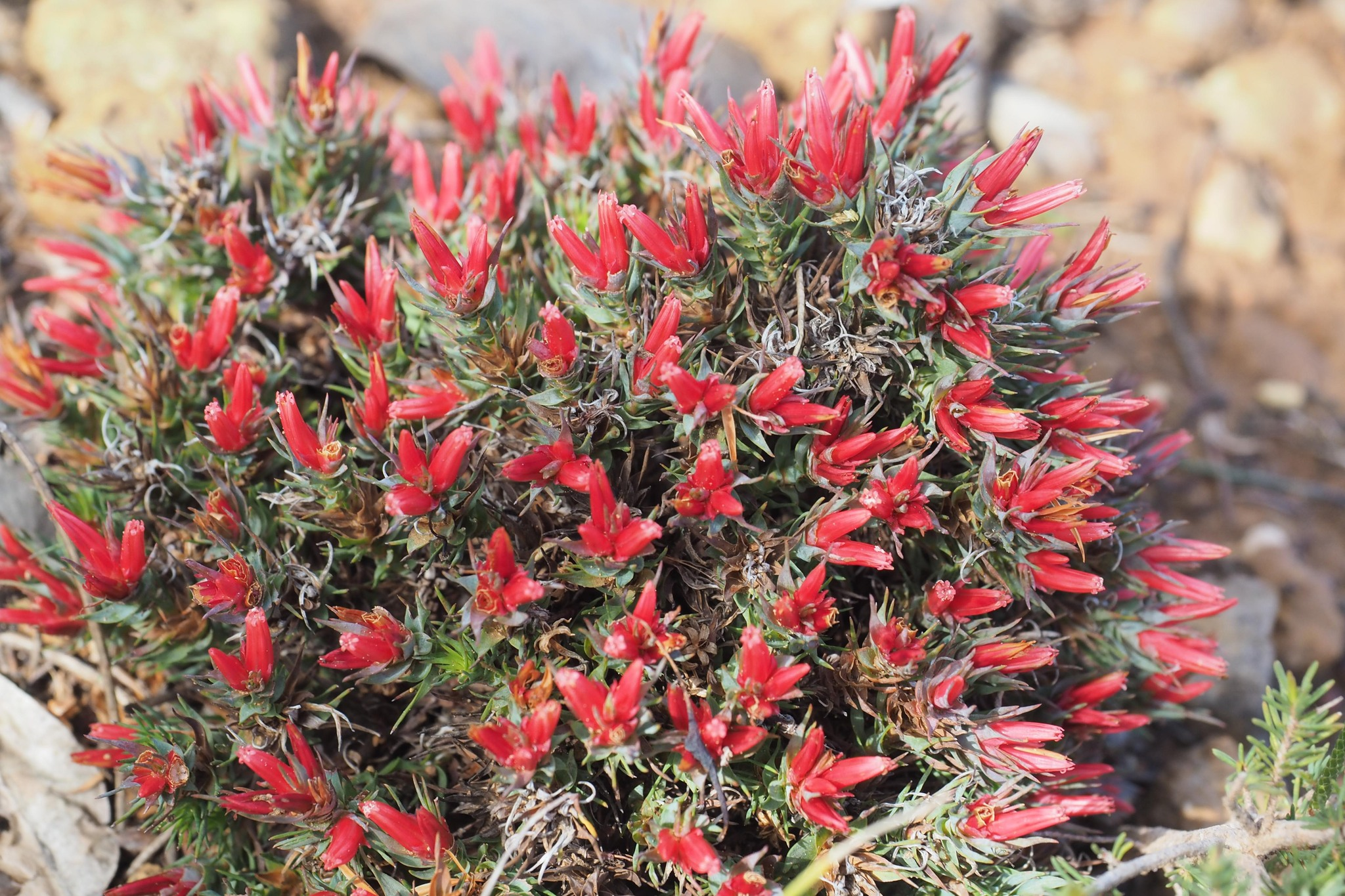

Conservation status
- Priority Four — Rare Taxa (DEC)

Scientific classification
- Kingdom: Plantae
- Clade: Tracheophytes
- Clade: Angiosperms
- Clade: Eudicots
- Clade: Asterids
- Order: Ericales
- Family: Ericaceae
- Genus: Andersonia
- Species: A. grandiflora

Binomial name
- Andersonia grandiflora Stschegl.

Synonyms
- Andersonia spirophylla F.Muell. nom. inval., pro syn.; Sprengelia spirophylla F.Muell.

= Andersonia grandiflora =

Species of flowering plant

Andersonia grandiflora, commonly known as red andersonia, is a species of flowering plant in the family Ericaceae and is endemic to the south-west of Western Australia. It is a prostrate cushion shrub with lance-shaped leaves and groups of two to four reddish orange, tube-shaped flowers.

== Description ==
Andersonia grandiflora is a prostrate, densely-branched cushion shrub, that typically grows to 5–25 cm (2.0–9.8 in) high. Its leaves are lance-shaped, 4–15 mm (0.16–0.59 in) long and 1–4 mm (0.039–0.157 in) wide. The flowers are arranged in clusters of two to four on the ends and sides of branches, with leaf-like bracts sometimes longer than the flowers and keeled bracteoles about half as long as the sepals. The sepals are lance-shaped, 10–15 mm (0.39–0.59 in) long and glabrous, the petals reddish-orange and shorter than the sepals, with lobes longer than the petal tube and with a few soft hairs inside. The stamens are slightly longer than the petal tube with hairy filaments. Flowering occurs from July to October.

== Taxonomy ==
Andersonia grandiflora was first formally described in 1859 by Sergei Sergeyevich Sheglejev in the Bulletin de la Société impériale des Naturalistes de Moscou from specimens collected by James Drummond. The specific epithet (grandiflora) means 'large-flowered'.

== Distribution and habitat ==
This species of Andersonia grows in boggy flats and rocky slopes in the Stirling Range National Park and surrounding areas in the Esperance Plains and Jarrah Forest bioregions of south-western Western Australia.

== Conservation status ==
Andersonia grandiflora is listed as "Priority Four" by the Government of Western Australia Department of Biodiversity, Conservation and Attractions, meaning that it is rare or near threatened.
