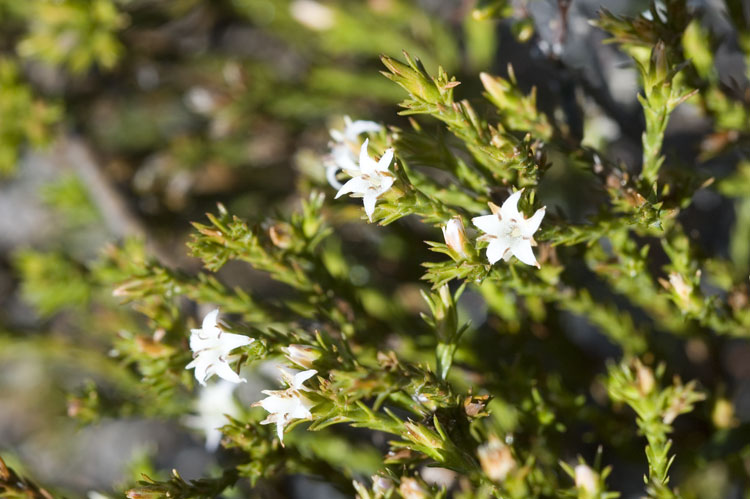
- In Cape Arid National Park

Scientific classification
- Kingdom: Plantae
- Clade: Tracheophytes
- Clade: Angiosperms
- Clade: Eudicots
- Clade: Asterids
- Order: Ericales
- Family: Ericaceae
- Genus: Andersonia
- Species: A. micrantha

Binomial name
- Andersonia micrantha R.Br.

Synonyms
- Sprengelia micrantha (R.Br.) F.Muell.

= Andersonia micrantha =

Species of flowering plant

Andersonia macranthera is a species of flowering plant in the family Ericaceae and is endemic to the south of Western Australia. It is a low, compact, cushion-like shrub with pointed egg-shaped leaves and white flowers.

== Description ==
Andersonia macranthera is a low, compact, cushion-like shrub that typically grows to a height 5–30 cm (2.0–11.8 in). Its leaves are pointed egg-shaped, 1–5 mm (0.039–0.197 in) long and 0.5–1.5 mm (0.020–0.059 in) wide with the ends curved backwards. The flowers are arranged with about ten to fifteen leaves and bracteoles on the flower stalk. The sepals are lance-shaped, mostly 4–5 mm (0.16–0.20 in) long and hairy. The petals are white, forming a tube shorter than the sepals, with lobes about the same length or shorter than the petal tube and bearded in the lower half. The stamens are about the same length as the petal tube, the anthers up to 1 mm (0.039 in) long but shorter than the filaments.

== Taxonomy ==
Andersonia micrantha was first formally described in 1810 by Robert Brown in his Prodromus Florae Novae Hollandiae from specimens he collected at King George Sound in 1801. The specific epithet (micrantha) means 'small-flowered'.

== Distribution and habitat ==
This species of Andersonia grows in sand or sandy loam in the Esperance Plains, Jarrah Forest, Swan Coastal Plain, and Warren bioregions of southern Western Australia.

== Conservation status ==
Andersonia micrantha is listed as "not threatened" by the Government of Western Australia Department of Biodiversity, Conservation and Attractions.
