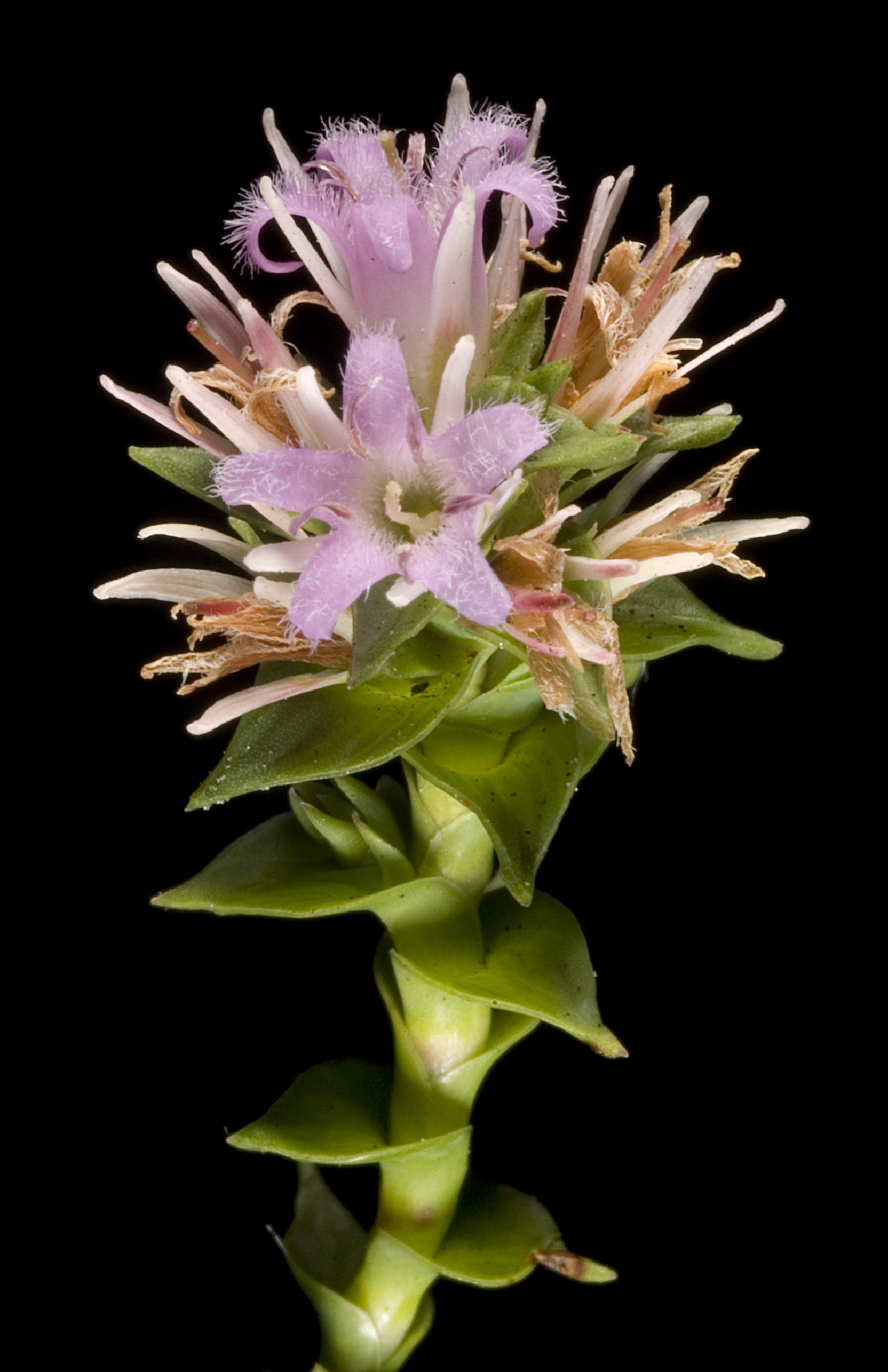

Scientific classification
- Kingdom: Plantae
- Clade: Tracheophytes
- Clade: Angiosperms
- Clade: Eudicots
- Clade: Asterids
- Order: Ericales
- Family: Ericaceae
- Genus: Andersonia
- Species: A. sprengelioides

Binomial name
- Andersonia sprengelioides R.Br.

Synonyms
- Andersonia fraseri Sond.; Andersonia patens Sond.; Andersonia sprengelioides var. patens (Sond.) Diels & E.Pritz.; Andersonia sprengelioides R.Br. var. sprengelioides; Andersonia sprengelioides var. typica Diels & E.Pritz.; Sprengelia andersoni F.Muell. orth. var.; Sprengelia andersonii F.Muell. nom. illeg.

= Andersonia sprengelioides =

Species of flowering plant

Andersonia sprengelioides is a species of flowering plant in the family Ericaceae and is endemic to the south-west corner of Western Australia. It is a dense, cushion- or mat-like shrub with lance-shaped to more or less egg-shaped leaves and pink or bluish-purple flowers.

== Description ==
Andersonia sprengelioides is a dense, cushion- or mat-like shrub that typically grows to a height of 10–40 cm (3.9–15.7 in). Its leaves are lance-shaped to egg-shaped, mostly 3–7 mm (0.12–0.28 in) long and usually grooved. The flowers are arranged at the ends of the branches in groups of three to twelve with leaf-like bracts usually shorter than the flowers and shorter, boat-shaped bracteoles. The sepals are lance-shaped, pink to blue, mostly about 7 mm (0.28 in) long and sometimes hairy. The petals are pink or bluish-purple, forming a tube with lobes one half to three-quarters as long as the petal tube and bearded in the lower half. The stamens are about the same length as the petal tube, the anthers about 2 mm (0.079 in) long.

== Taxonomy ==
Andersonia sprengelioides was first formally described in 1810 by Robert Brown in his Prodromus Florae Novae Hollandiae from specimens he collected in 1802. The specific epithet (sprengelioides) means 'Sprengelia-like'.

== Distribution and habitat ==
This species of Andersonia grows in a sandy, granitic soils on granite outcrops and coastal areas in the Esperance Plains, Jarrah Forest, Mallee, Swan Coastal Plain and Warren bioregions of southern Western Australia.

== Conservation status ==
Andersonia parvifolia is listed as "not threatened" by the Government of Western Australia Department of Biodiversity, Conservation and Attractions.
