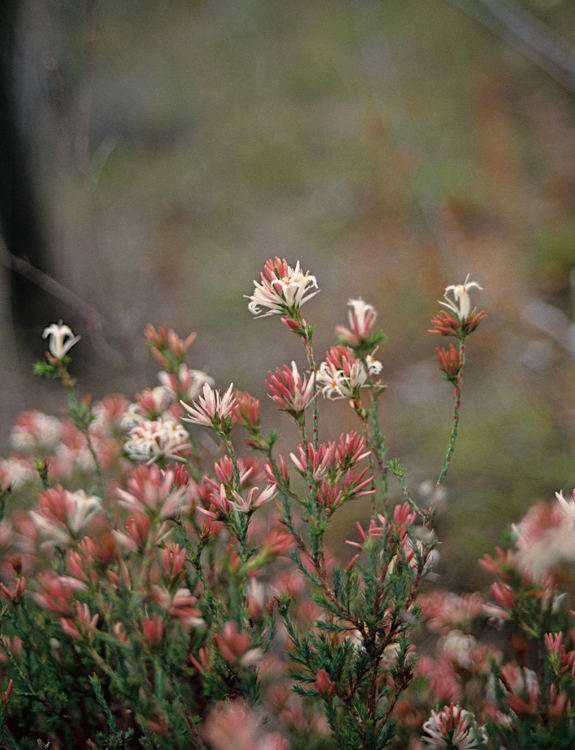
- In Kalamunda National Park

Conservation status
- Declared rare (DEC)

Scientific classification
- Kingdom: Plantae
- Clade: Tracheophytes
- Clade: Angiosperms
- Clade: Eudicots
- Clade: Asterids
- Order: Ericales
- Family: Ericaceae
- Genus: Andersonia
- Species: A. gracilis

Binomial name
- Andersonia gracilis DC.

= Andersonia gracilis =

Species of flowering plant

Andersonia gracilis is a species of flowering plant in the family Ericaceae and is endemic to the southwest of Western Australia. It is a slender erect or open straggly shrub with more or less lance-shaped leaves and groups of two to ten densely bearded, white or pinkish-purple, tube-shaped flowers.

== Description ==
Andersonia gracilis is a slender erected or open straggly shrub, that typically grows to 10–50 cm (3.9–19.7 in) high. Its leaves are more or less lance-shaped, 2–5 mm (0.079–0.197 in) long and 1.0–1.5 mm (0.039–0.059 in) wide, the tips keeled or with a small point. The flowers are arranged in clusters of two to ten on the ends of branches, with egg-shaped bracts about 5 mm (0.20 in) long at the base and about half as long as the sepals, and shorter bracteoles. The sepals are broadly lance-shaped, 7–9 mm (0.28–0.35 in) long and the petals are white or pinkish-purple and form a tube about as long as the sepals, with densely bearded lobes as long as the petal tube. The stamens are slightly longer than the petal tube with glabrous filaments. Flowering occurs from September to November.

== Taxonomy ==
Andersonia gracilis was first formally described in 1839 by Augustin Pyramus de Candolle in his Prodromus Systematis Naturalis Regni Vegetabilis from specimens collected near the Swan River by James Drummond. The specific epithet (gracilis) means 'thin' or 'slender'.

== Distribution and habitat ==
This species of Andersonia grows in winter-wet areas and near swamps near Perth in the Geraldton Sandplains and Swan Coastal Plain of south-western Western Australia.

== Conservation status ==
Andersonia gracilis is listed as "Threatened Flora (Declared Rare Flora — Extant)" by the Government of Western Australia Department of Biodiversity, Conservation and Attractions.
