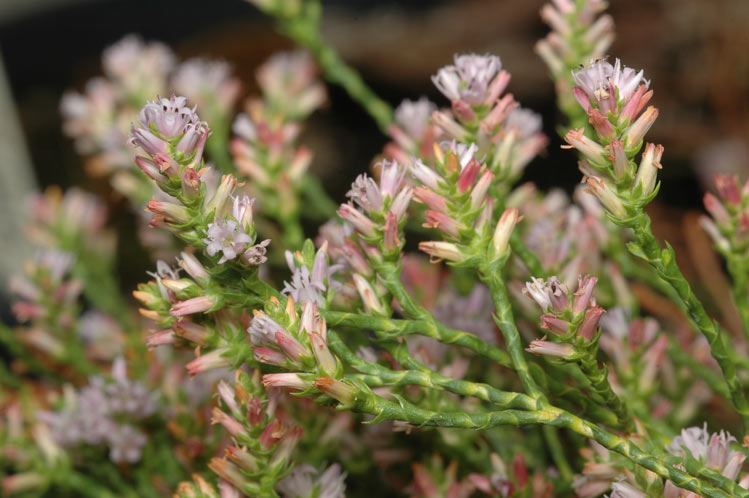
- In the ANBG

Scientific classification
- Kingdom: Plantae
- Clade: Tracheophytes
- Clade: Angiosperms
- Clade: Eudicots
- Clade: Asterids
- Order: Ericales
- Family: Ericaceae
- Genus: Andersonia
- Species: A. parvifolia

Binomial name
- Andersonia parvifolia R.Br.

Synonyms
- Andersonia brachyota F.Muell.; Andersonia pauciflora Sond.; Sprengelia brachyota (F.Muell.) F.Muell.; Sprengelia parvifolia (R.Br.) F.Muell.

= Andersonia parvifolia =

Species of flowering plant

Andersonia parvifolia is a species of flowering plant in the family Ericaceae and is endemic to the south of Western Australia. It is a slender, erect shrub with pointed, egg-shaped leaves pressed against the stem and pink or pinkish-blue or pinkish-purple flowers.

== Description ==
Andersonia parvifolia is a slender, erect shrub that typically grows to a height of 10–50 cm (3.9–19.7 in). Its leaves are pointed egg-shaped, mostly 1–3 mm (0.039–0.118 in) long, 0.25–0.75 mm (0.0098–0.0295 in) wide and pressed against the stem with a rigid tip on the end. The flowers are arranged in groups of four to ten with leaf-like bracts 1–3 mm (0.039–0.118 in) long and similar bracteoles. The sepals are lance-shaped, mostly 4–6 mm (0.16–0.24 in) long and hairy. The petals are pink or pinkish-blue or pinkish-purple, forming a tube with lobes about half as long as the petal tube and bearded in the lower half. The stamens are about the same length as the petal tube, the anthers about 1 mm (0.039 in) long but half as long as the filaments.

== Taxonomy ==
Andersonia parvifolia was first formally described in 1810 by Robert Brown in his Prodromus Florae Novae Hollandiae from specimens he collected in 1802. The specific epithet (parvifolia) means 'small-flowered'.

== Distribution and habitat ==
This species of Andersonia grows in a range of soil types in the Avon Wheatbelt, Esperance Plains, Jarrah Forest, Mallee, and Warren bioregions of southern Western Australia.

== Conservation status ==
Andersonia parvifolia is listed as "not threatened" by the Government of Western Australia Department of Biodiversity, Conservation and Attractions.
