= Andersonia setifolia =

Conservation status
- Priority Three — Poorly Known Taxa (DEC)

Scientific classification
- Kingdom: Plantae
- Clade: Tracheophytes
- Clade: Angiosperms
- Clade: Eudicots
- Clade: Asterids
- Order: Ericales
- Family: Ericaceae
- Genus: Andersonia
- Species: A. setifolia

Binomial name
- Andersonia setifolia Benth.

Synonyms
- Andersonia macronema F.Muell. nom. inval., pro syn.; Andersonia macronema (F.Muell.) F.Muell.; Sprengelia macronema F.Muell.; Sprengelia setifolia (Benth.) F.Muell.

Species of flowering plant

Andersonia setifolia is a species of flowering plant in the family Ericaceae and is endemic to the south of Western Australia. It is a low-lying to erect, often cushion-forming shrub with usually linear to pointed lance-shaped leaves with a sheathing base, and red or white flowers.

== Description ==
Andersonia setifolia is a low-lying to erect, often cushion-forming shrub that typically grows to a height of 5–15 cm (2.0–5.9 in). Its leaves are erect to spreading, linear to pointed lance-shaped, mostly 1–7 mm (0.039–0.276 in) long, 0.25–1.5 mm (0.0098–0.0591 in) wide. The flowers are arranged in groups of mostly four to ten with pointed bracts. The sepals are lance-shaped, mostly 2–7 mm (0.079–0.276 in) long and usually hairy. The petals are red or white, forming a tube longer than the sepals, with lobes about as the petal tube and bearded inside. The stamens are about the same length as the petal tube, the anthers 1–2 mm (0.039–0.079 in) long but less than half as long as the filaments.

== Taxonomy ==
Andersonia setifolia was first formally described in 1868 by George Bentham in his Flora Australiensis from specimens collected at Collie and King George Sound. The specific epithet (setifolia) means 'bristle-leaved'.

== Distribution and habitat ==
This species of Andersonia grows in a sandy and gravelly soils near King George Sound, Mount Manypeaks and the Stirling Range in the Esperance Plains, Jarrah Forest, Mallee, and Warren bioregions of southern Western Australia.

== Conservation status ==
Andersonia setifolia is listed as "Priority Three" by the Government of Western Australia Department of Biodiversity, Conservation and Attractions meaning that it is poorly known and known from only a few locations but is not under imminent threat.
