= Grovesiella =

Scientific classification
- Kingdom: Fungi
- Division: Ascomycota
- Class: Leotiomycetes
- Order: Helotiales
- Family: Helotiaceae
- Genus: Grovesiella; M.Morelet (1969)

Type species
- Grovesiella abieticola (Zeller & Goodd.) M.Morelet & Gremmen (1969)

Genus of fungi

Grovesiella is a genus of fungi in the family Helotiaceae. The genus contains three species.

The genus name of Grovesiella is in honour of James Walton Groves (1906-1970), who was a Canadian mycologist.

The genus was circumscribed by Michel Morelet in Bull. Soc. Sci. Nat. Archéol. Toulon & Var vol.185 on page 8 in 1969.
