= Andersonia latiflora =

Scientific classification
- Kingdom: Plantae
- Clade: Tracheophytes
- Clade: Angiosperms
- Clade: Eudicots
- Clade: Asterids
- Order: Ericales
- Family: Ericaceae
- Genus: Andersonia
- Species: A. latiflora

Binomial name
- Andersonia latiflora (F.Muell.) Benth.

Synonyms
- Andersonia latiflora F.Muell. nom. inval., pro syn.; Andersonia latiflora (F.Muell.) Benth. var. latiflora; Sprengelia latiflora F.Muell.

Species of flowering plant

Andersonia latiflora is a species of flowering plant in the family Ericaceae and is endemic to the south-west of Western Australia. It is an erect, straggling shrub with egg-shaped to lance-shaped leaves and white flowers.

== Description ==
Andersonia latiflora is an erect, straggling shrub that typically grows to a height of less than 30 cm (12 in). Its leaves are egg-shaped to lance-shaped with a pointed tip, mostly 2–12 mm (0.079–0.472 in) long and 1–4 mm (0.039–0.157 in) wide with the ends curved backwards. The flowers are arranged in clusters of five to twenty on the ends of branches and have egg-shaped bracts and boat-shaped bracteoles often twice as long as the bracts. The sepals are oblong, 10–15 mm (0.39–0.59 in) long, usually about twice as long as the bracts. The petals are white, forming a tube shorter than the sepals, with lobes about half as long as the petal tube and bearded in the lower half. The stamens are about as long as the petal tube, the anthers linear, 2.5 mm (0.098 in) long.

== Taxonomy ==
This species was first formally described in 1867 by Ferdinand von Mueller, who gave it the name Sprengelia latiflora in his Fragmenta Phytographiae Australiae. In 1868, George Bentham transferred the species to Andersonia as A. latifolia in his Flora Australiensis. The specific epithet (latifolia) means 'broad-flowered'.

== Distribution and habitat ==
This species of Andersonia grows in gravelly soils in the Jarrah Forest and Swan Coastal Plain bioregions of south-western Western Australia.

== Conservation status ==
Andersonia latiflora is listed as "not threatened" by the Government of Western Australia Department of Biodiversity, Conservation and Attractions.
