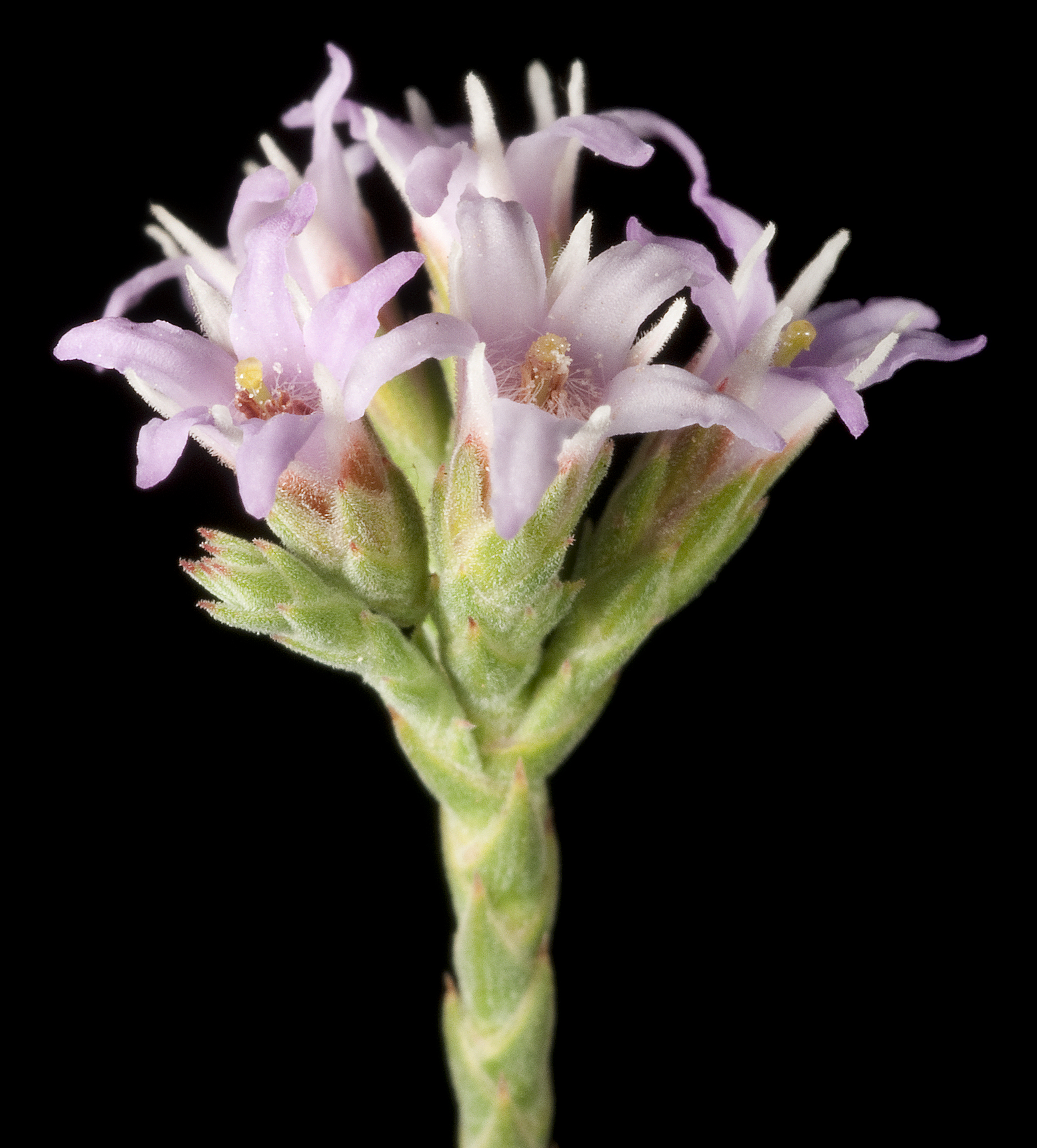

Conservation status
- Priority Two — Poorly Known Taxa (DEC)

Scientific classification
- Kingdom: Plantae
- Clade: Tracheophytes
- Clade: Angiosperms
- Clade: Eudicots
- Clade: Asterids
- Order: Ericales
- Family: Ericaceae
- Genus: Andersonia
- Species: A. brevifolia

Binomial name
- Andersonia brevifolia Sond.

Synonyms
- Sprengelia brevifolia (Sond.) F.Muell.

= Andersonia brevifolia =

Species of flowering plant

Andersonia brevifolia is a species of flowering plant in the family Ericaceae and is endemic to the south-west of Western Australia. It is an erect shrub with egg-shaped leaves and white or pink flowers.

== Description ==
Andersonia brevifolia is an erect shrub with many branches and that typically grows to a height of up to 10–60 cm (3.9–23.6 in). Its leaves are overlapping, usually pressed against the stem, egg-shaped, 1–2 mm (0.039–0.079 in) long and 0.5–1.5 mm (0.020–0.059 in) wide. The flowers have 10 to 15 leaf-like bracteoles on their stalks. The sepals are linear, 4–6 mm (0.16–0.24 in) long and usually hairy. The petals are white or pink, about as long as the sepals, with lobes slightly shorter than the petal tube. The stamens are about the same length or slightly longer than the petal tube, the anthers usually more than half the length of the filaments.

== Taxonomy ==
Andersonia brevifolia was first formally described in 1845 by Otto Wilhelm Sonder in Lehmann's Plantae Preissianae from specimens collected near York in 1839. The specific epithet (brevifolia) means 'short-leaved'.

== Distribution and habitat ==
This species of Andersonia grows in sandy and gravelly soils in the Avon Wheatbelt, Jarrah Forest and Swan Coastal Plain bioregions of south-western Western Australia.

== Conservation status ==
Andersonia brevifolia is listed as "not threatened" by the Government of Western Australia Department of Biodiversity, Conservation and Attractions.
