= Andersonia geniculata =

Scientific classification
- Kingdom: Plantae
- Clade: Tracheophytes
- Clade: Angiosperms
- Clade: Eudicots
- Clade: Asterids
- Order: Ericales
- Family: Ericaceae
- Genus: Andersonia
- Species: A. geniculata

Binomial name
- Andersonia geniculata Lemson

Species of flowering plant

Andersonia geniculata is a species of flowering plant in the family Ericaceae and is endemic to the southwest of Western Australia. It is a low, spreading shrub with twisted, linear or very narrowly egg-shaped leaves and white, tube-shaped flowers.

== Description ==
Andersonia geniculata is a low, spreading or cushion-like shrub, that typically grows up to 5–20 cm (2.0–7.9 in) high and 20 cm (7.9 in) wide. The leaves are twisted, linear or very narrowly egg-shaped, and 7–11 mm (0.28–0.43 in) long. The flowers are arranged in clusters of five to ten in leaf axils, with egg-shaped, leaf-like bracteoles 6–8 mm (0.24–0.31 in) long. The sepals are narrowly egg-shaped, 8–10.5 mm (0.31–0.41 in) long and creamy-white. The petals are white and form an oval to cup-shaped tube 7.5–10.5 mm (0.30–0.41 in) long with linear lobes 4.6–5.8 mm (0.18–0.23 in) long. The stamens are 5.5–8.5 mm (0.22–0.33 in) long, the anthers yellow and oblong, 1.6–3 mm (0.063–0.118 in) long. Flowering occurs from late August to early November.

== Taxonomy ==
Andersonia geniculata was first formally described in 2007 by Kristina L. Lemson in the journal Nuytsia from specimens collected 21 km (13 mi) north of Walpole in 1994. The specific epithet (geniculata) means 'with bended knee', and refers to the stamen filaments.

== Distribution and habitat ==
This species of Andersonia grows in low sedgeland on the edges of swamps and in open areas in forest, between Manjimup and Walpole, in the Jarrah Forest and Warren bioregions of south-western Western Australia.

== Conservation status ==
Andersonia geniculata is listed as "not threatened" by the Government of Western Australia Department of Biodiversity, Conservation and Attractions.
