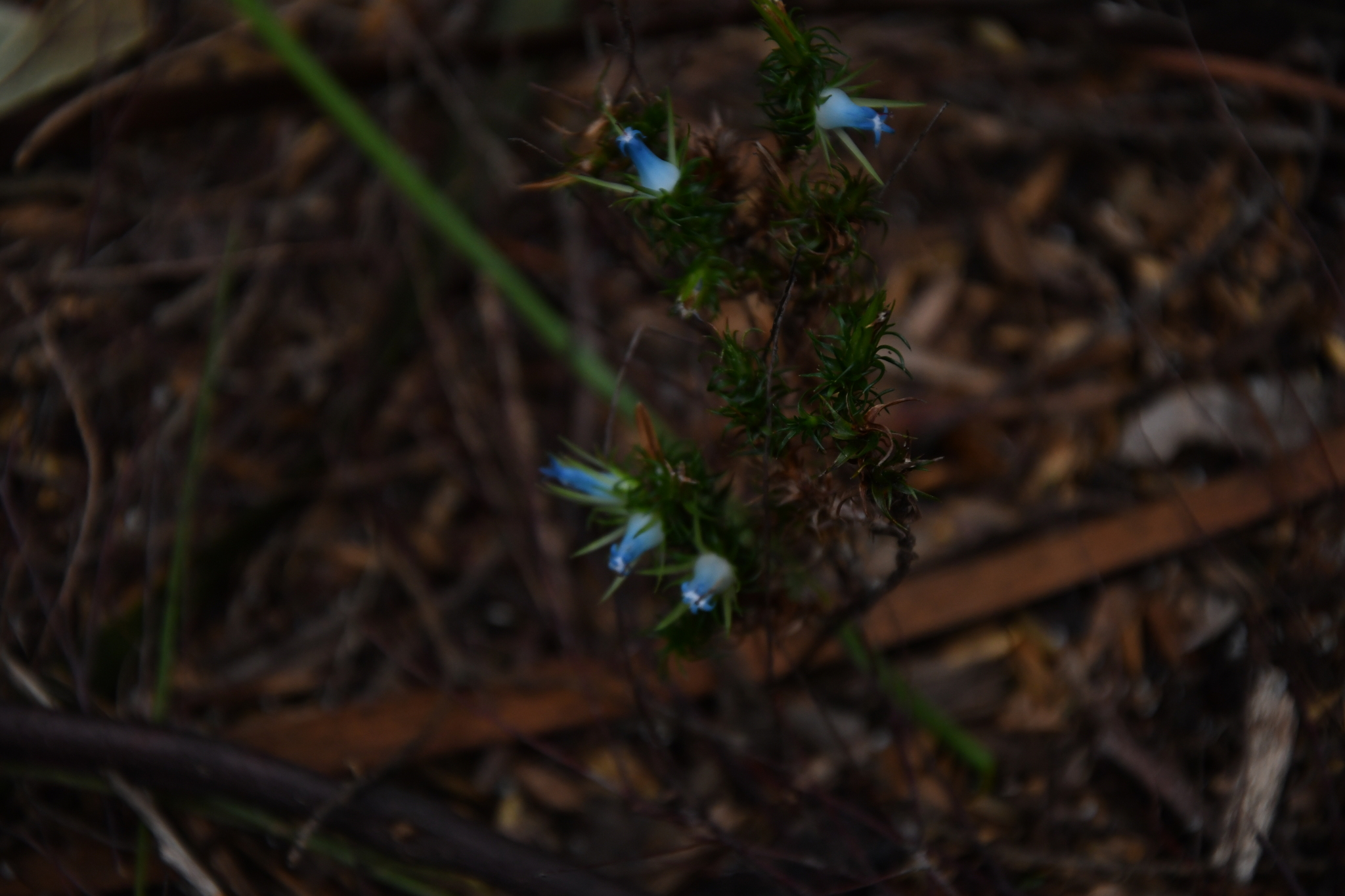

Conservation status
- Priority Two — Poorly Known Taxa (DEC)

Scientific classification
- Kingdom: Plantae
- Clade: Tracheophytes
- Clade: Angiosperms
- Clade: Eudicots
- Clade: Asterids
- Order: Ericales
- Family: Ericaceae
- Genus: Andersonia
- Species: A. hammersleyana

Binomial name
- Andersonia hammersleyana Lemson

= Andersonia hammersleyana =

Species of flowering plant

Andersonia hammersleyana is a species of flowering plant in the family Ericaceae and is endemic to the southwest of Western Australia. It is an erect or low-lying, straggling shrub with twisted, linear to narrowly egg-shaped leaves and bright blue, tube-shaped flowers.

== Description ==
Andersonia hammersleyana is an erect or low-lying, straggling shrub, that typically grows up to 1 m (3 ft 3 in) high. The leaves are twisted, linear to narrowly egg-shaped, and 12–20 mm (0.47–0.79 in) long. The flowers are arranged on the ends of branches, the sepals egg-shaped to very narrowly egg-shaped or linear, 12–16.5 mm (0.47–0.65 in) long and greenish white. The petals are blue or blue and white and form a narrowly urn-shaped to almost cylindrical tube 12–16 mm (0.47–0.63 in) long with narrowly triangular to linear lobes 6–8 mm (0.24–0.31 in) long with soft hairs that form a tuft or beard at the end of the lobe. The stamens are 7–10 mm (0.28–0.39 in) long, the anthers red or violet, 1.5–2.5 mm (0.059–0.098 in) long. Flowering has been observed from August to October.

== Taxonomy ==
Andersonia hammersleyana was first formally described in 2007 by Kristina L. Lemson in the journal Nuytsia from specimens collected in Mount Lindesay National Park in 1990. The specific epithet (hammersleyana) honours Brenda Hammersley, for her contribution to the knowledge of the flora of the Denmark area.

== Distribution and habitat ==
This species of Andersonia grows in open jarrah woodland near Mount Lindsey in the Jarrah Forest bioregion of south-western Western Australia.

== Conservation status ==
Andersonia hammersleyana is listed as "Priority Two" by the Government of Western Australia Department of Biodiversity, Conservation and Attractions, meaning that it is poorly known and from one or a few locations.
