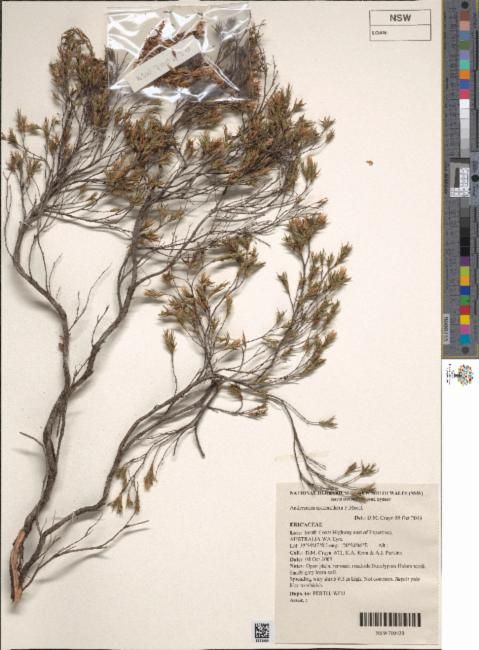
- Holotype in the National Herbarium of New South Wales

Scientific classification
- Kingdom: Plantae
- Clade: Tracheophytes
- Clade: Angiosperms
- Clade: Eudicots
- Clade: Asterids
- Order: Ericales
- Family: Ericaceae
- Genus: Andersonia
- Species: A. macranthera

Binomial name
- Andersonia macranthera F.Muell.

Synonyms
- Sprengelia brachynema F.Muell. nom. illeg.; Andersonia heterophylla auct. non Sond.: Bentham, G.

= Andersonia macranthera =

Species of flowering plant

Andersonia macranthera is a species of flowering plant in the family Ericaceae and is endemic to the south of Western Australia. It is a spindly erect, or straggling shrub with pointed egg-shaped leaves and pink, pinkish blue or pinkish purple and red flowers.

== Description ==
Andersonia macranthera is a spindly erect, or straggling shrub that typically grows to a height of more than 30 cm (12 in). Its leaves are pointed egg-shaped to linear, mostly 2–6 mm (0.079–0.236 in) long and 1–2 mm (0.039–0.079 in) wide with the ends curved backwards. The flowers are arranged with about twelve leaves and bracteoles on the flower stalk. The sepals are lance-shaped, about 7 mm (0.28 in) long and blue or pink when dried. The petals are pink, pinkish blue or pinkish purple and red, forming a tube shorter than the sepals, with lobes about half as long as the petal tube and bearded in the lower half. The stamens are about 3 mm (0.12 in) long and longer than the petal tube, the anthers longer than the filaments.

== Taxonomy ==
Andersonia macranthera was first formally described in 1864 by Ferdinand von Mueller in his Fragmenta Phytographiae Australiae. The specific epithet (macranthera) means 'large' or 'long anthers'.

== Distribution and habitat ==
This species of Andersonia grows in sand on sandplains near Esperance in the Esperance Plains and Mallee bioregions of south-western Western Australia.

== Conservation status ==
Andersonia macranthera is listed as "not threatened" by the Government of Western Australia Department of Biodiversity, Conservation and Attractions.
