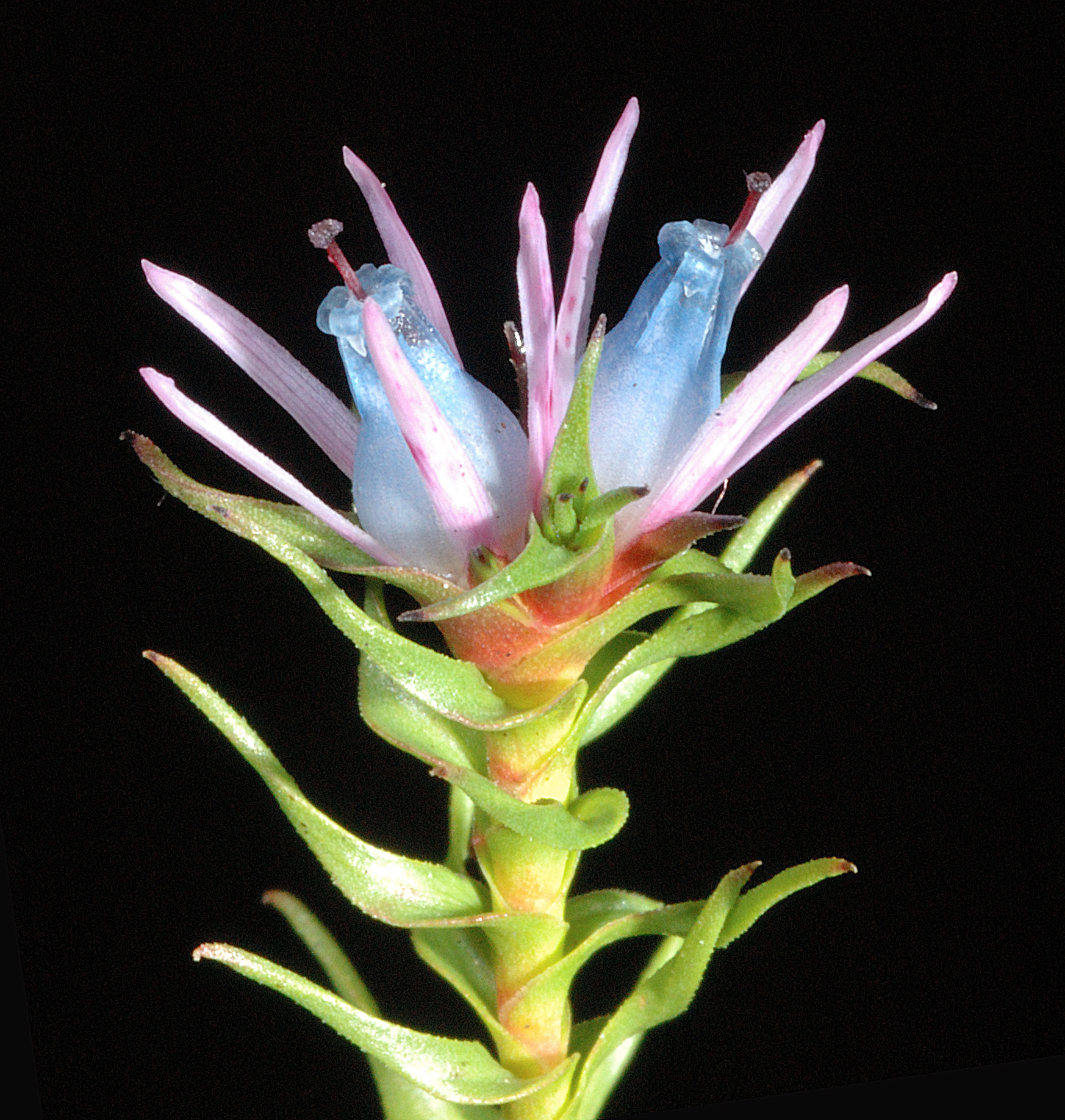

Scientific classification
- Kingdom: Plantae
- Clade: Tracheophytes
- Clade: Angiosperms
- Clade: Eudicots
- Clade: Asterids
- Order: Ericales
- Family: Ericaceae
- Genus: Andersonia
- Species: A. lehmanniana

Binomial name
- Andersonia lehmanniana Sond.

Synonyms
- Andersonia sprengelioides var. lehmanniana (Sond.) Diels & E.Pritz.; Andersonia sprengelioides auct. non R.Br.: Bentham, G.

= Andersonia lehmanniana =

Species of flowering plant

Andersonia lehmanniana is a species of flowering plant in the family Ericaceae and is endemic to the south-west of Western Australia. It is a shrub with pointed lance-shaped leaves and white, cream-coloured or pink and blue or purple flowers.

== Description ==
Andersonia lehmanniana is a shrub that typically grows to a height of 15–60 cm (5.9–23.6 in). Its leaves are lance-shaped with a pointed tip, 1–10 mm (0.039–0.394 in) long with the ends curved backwards. The flowers are arranged in heads of three to twelve or more, and have oblong sepals 5–9 mm (0.20–0.35 in) long, the petals white, cream-coloured or pink and blue or purple, forming a tube with lobes shorter than the petal tube and bearded inside.

== Taxonomy ==
Andersonia lehmanniana was first formally described in 1845 by Otto Wilhelm Sonder in Lehmann's Plantae Preissianae from specimens collected near Guildford in 1839. The specific epithet (lehmanniana) honours Johann Georg Christian Lehmann.

In 1962, Leslie Watson described subspecies pubescens (previously known as Andersonia pubescens Sond.), and that name, and the name of the autonym, are accepted by the Australian Plant Census.

- Andersonia lehmanniana Sond. subsp. lehmanniana (the autonym) is an erect, bushy, compact shrub 15–60 cm (5.9–23.6 in) high, with leaves mostly 3–7 mm (0.12–0.28 in) long and 2–3 mm (0.079–0.118 in) wide, flowers on the ends of branches, sepals usually about 7 mm (0.28 in) long, petals white, pink and blue and about 1 mm (0.039 in) shorter than the sepals, the lobes 3/4 as long as the petal tube
- Andersonia lehmanniana subsp. pubescens (Sond.) L.Watson is an erect or sprawling shrub, 25–50 cm (9.8–19.7 in) high, with leaves mostly 1–4 mm (0.039–0.157 in) long and more or less pressed against the stem, flowers mostly not on the ends of branches which continue to grow after flowering, sepals usually narrower than those of subsp. lehmanniana, petals pink, bluish purple or pink and cream-coloured, usually less densely bearded that in the other subspecies.

== Distribution and habitat ==
This species of Andersonia grows in sandy soils on sandplains or hills between Geraldton and Hopetoun in the Avon Wheatbelt, Esperance Plains, Geraldton Sandplains, Jarrah Forest, Mallee and Swan Coastal Plain bioregions of south-western Western Australiai. Subspecies lehmanniana occurs in near-coastal areas and subsp. pubescens in more inland areas of the same regions.

== Conservation status ==
Both subspecies of Andersonia lehmanniana are listed as "not threatened" by the Government of Western Australia Department of Biodiversity, Conservation and Attractions.
