= James Walton Groves =

Canadian mycologist

James Walton Groves (October 18, 1906 - May 6, 1970) was a Canadian mycologist born in Kinburn, Ontario, on October 18, 1906, to John James and Laura Groves. He displayed an early interest in education and learning. He taught himself the alphabet from a decorated bowl, and impressed visitors to the family farm by reading aloud the newspaper by age four. In 1918, his father John sustained an injury from an accident and the family moved to Ottawa. He then attended Lisgar High School and later the Ottawa Normal School with the intention of teaching for a career. From 1926 to 1928 he taught public school, denying offers at universities and encouraging his students to pursue graduate educations in mycology. A Summer job with the Canada Department of Agriculture in 1929 as a plant disease investigator is credited by him as an introduction to the field of botanical research and jumpstarting his research career. In 1930 he graduated from Queen's University for biology and a minor in chemistry with honors. Similar roles were held throughout his education while he earned his M.A. from the University of Toronto in 1932, and his Ph.D. in 1935. Many Summers were also spent at Lake Timagami, where he worked for a year after earning his Ph.D. with H.S. Jackson.

== Career ==
In 1933 he became a member of the Mycological Society of America. James Walton Groves remained at the Canada Department of Agriculture throughout his career with a focus on taxonomic mycology. In 1951 he became the Chief of Mycology for the newly created section, and held additional responsibilities from 1959 to 1962 for the Vascular Plant Taxonomy section. He was pivotal in the development of the Canadian National Mycological Herbarium. In 1967 he gave up his administrative duties for health reasons, choosing to use his time on his research.

== Research ==
The Ascomycetes, particularly Dermateaceae and Sclerotiniaceae, were his primary areas of research. For Dermateaceae he established taxonomic relationships from findings related to the formation of the conidium for various Genera of Helotiales including Dermeteaceae and Helotiaceae. His work on Sclerotiniaceae resulted in elucidations of the life cycle of these plant parasites. This research was important during World War II when seed importation was restricted, and the development of control measures for these pathogens helped to provide greater food security as well as his own taxonomic work. Work was also carried out on the Agaricaceae, Boletaceae, and gasteroid fungi as a result of public demand. This work greatly expanded the Canadian National Mycological Herbarium and led to James meeting artist and author H. A. C. Jackson and marrying his daughter Dr. Naomi Catherine Adair Jackson. This work was featured in a post mortem publication book Edible and Poisonous Mushrooms of Canada, which largely covered the families of Agaricaceae and Boletaceae. He has published other articles as well.

== Personal life ==
During his time at Lake Timagami after earning his Ph.D. he met Elsie Margaret Reah and they married in 1936 and moved to Ottawa for a position James accepted with the Canada Department of Agriculture. They were active community members engaging in the Ottawa Field-Naturalists' Club and the Ottawa Choral Society. In 1956 Elsie died, and James married again to Dr. Naomi Catherine Adair Jackson, whose work he greatly admired, on Dec. 21, 1957 in Manotick. James Watson Groves was described as having a deep sense of obligation and conviction to his work. He had many varied interests and a great sense of humor, and was considered a role-model to many of his students. He died on May 6, 1970, at the age of 63 from a heart attack after being taken to the hospital two days prior, and is buried at Pakenham Union Cemetery.

== Honours ==
Several genera of fungi have been named after James Walton Groves. Including, in 1960, botanist Richard William George Dennis published Grovesia, which is a genus of fungi in the family Helotiaceae. In 1969, Grovesiella was published by Michel Morelet, which is another genus of fungi in the family Helotiaceae. Then in 1983, Grovesinia was published, which is a genus of fungi in the family Sclerotiniaceae.
