= Andersonia ferricola =

Conservation status
- Priority One — Poorly Known Taxa (DEC)

Scientific classification
- Kingdom: Plantae
- Clade: Tracheophytes
- Clade: Angiosperms
- Clade: Eudicots
- Clade: Asterids
- Order: Ericales
- Family: Ericaceae
- Genus: Andersonia
- Species: A. ferricola

Binomial name
- Andersonia ferricola Lemson

Species of flowering plant

Andersonia ferricola is a species of flowering plant in the family Ericaceae and is endemic to a restricted part of the southwest of Western Australia. It is a straggling shrub with twisted, narrowly egg-shaped leaves and pale lilac, tube-shaped flowers.

== Description ==
Andersonia ferricola is a straggling shrub that typically grows to a height of up to 50 cm (20 in). The leaves are wavy, twisted, narrowly egg-shaped, and 8–15 mm (0.31–0.59 in) long, the upper surface more or less glabrous and the lower surface with a few woolly hairs. The flowers are arranged in clusters of up to 30 in leaf axils, with narrowly egg-shaped, leaf-like bracteoles 6–7 mm (0.24–0.28 in) long. The sepals are narrowly egg-shaped to linear, 8–9 mm (0.31–0.35 in) long, and the petals form a cylindrical tube 7–8 mm (0.28–0.31 in) long with lobes spreading lobes 2.2–3.0 mm (0.087–0.118 in) long. The stamens are 6.6–8 mm (0.26–0.31 in) long, the anthers white and spindle-shaped to linear 2.0–2.5 mm (0.079–0.098 in) long.

== Taxonomy ==
Andersonia ferricola was first formally described in 2007 by Kristina L. Lemson in the journal Nuytsia from specimens collected in the Whicher Range area in 1993. The specific epithet (ferricola) means 'iron-dweller', and refers to the species ironstone habitat.

== Distribution and habitat ==
This species of Andersonia grows in dense, low heath on winter-wet ironstone flats in a small area south-east of Busselton in the Jarrah Forest, Swan Coastal Plain and Warren bioregions of south-western Western Australia.

== Conservation status ==
Andersonia ferricola is listed as "Priority One" by the Government of Western Australia Department of Biodiversity, Conservation and Attractions, meaning that it is known from only one or a few locations where it is potentially at risk.
