= Grovesinia =

Scientific classification
- Kingdom: Fungi
- Division: Ascomycota
- Class: Leotiomycetes
- Order: Helotiales
- Family: Sclerotiniaceae
- Genus: Grovesinia; M.N. Cline, J.L. Crane & S.D. Cline

Type species
- Grovesinia pyramidalis M.N. Cline, J.L. Crane & S.D. Cline

Genus of fungi

Grovesinia is a genus of fungi in the family Sclerotiniaceae.

The genus name of Grovesinia is in honour of James Walton Groves (1906-1970), who was a Canadian mycologist.

The genus was circumscribed by Molly Niedbalski Cline, J. Leland Crane and S.D. Cline in Mycologia vol.75 (Issue 6) on page 989 in 1983.
