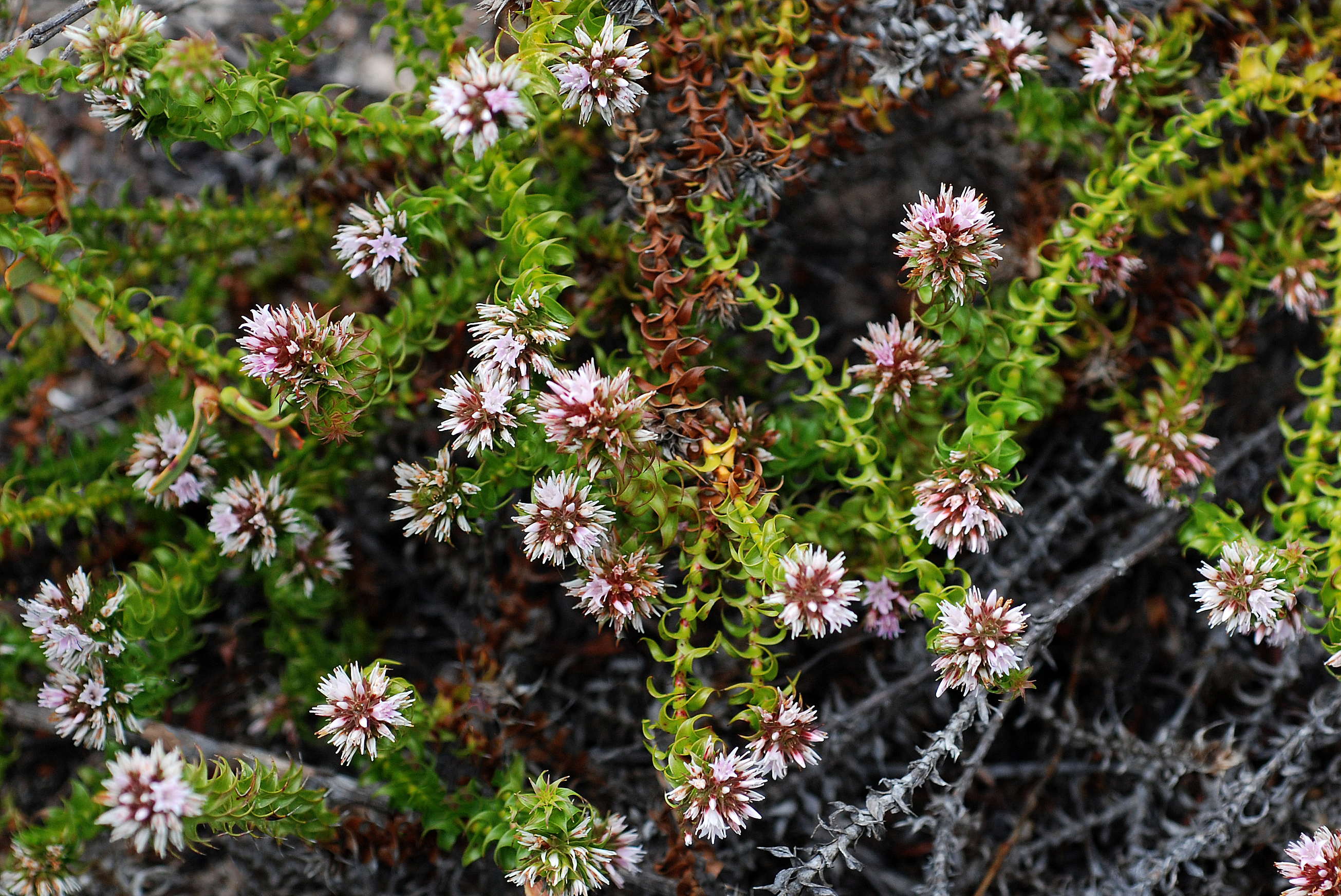

Scientific classification
- Kingdom: Plantae
- Clade: Tracheophytes
- Clade: Angiosperms
- Clade: Eudicots
- Clade: Asterids
- Order: Ericales
- Family: Ericaceae
- Genus: Andersonia
- Species: A. involucrata

Binomial name
- Andersonia involucrata Sond.

Synonyms
- Sprengelia involucrata (Sond.) F.Muell.

= Andersonia involucrata =

Species of flowering plant

Andersonia involucrata is a species of flowering plant in the family Ericaceae and is endemic to the south-west of Western Australia. It is a compact or straggling, spreading shrub with pointed egg-shaped to lance-shaped leaves and white or pink flowers.

== Description ==
Andersonia involucrata is a compact or straggling shrub that typically grows to a height of up to 30 cm (12 in) or more. Its leaves are egg-shaped to lance-shaped with a pointed tip, mostly 2–8 mm (0.079–0.315 in) long and 1–5 mm (0.039–0.197 in) wide with the ends curved backwards. The flowers are arranged in almost spherical heads 7–10 mm (0.28–0.39 in) in diameter and have egg-shaped bracts and flatted bracteoles on their stalks. The sepals are 2–4 mm (0.079–0.157 in) long, the petals white or pink, forming a tube shorter than the sepals, with lobes slightly shorter than the petal tube and usually bearded inside. The stamens are 1–4 mm (0.039–0.157 in) long and shorter than the petal tube, the anthers linear, usually half as long as the filaments.

== Taxonomy ==
Andersonia involucrata was first formally described in 1845 by Otto Wilhelm Sonder in Lehmann's Plantae Preissianae from specimens collected in the Sussex district in 1839. The specific epithet (involucrata) means 'having leaves or bracts surrounded the base of the flower heads'.

== Distribution and habitat ==
This species of Andersonia grows in sandy soils in winter-wet flats and swamps, or on breakaways and hillsides between Perth and Busselton in the Geraldton Sandplains, Jarrah Forest, Swan Coastal Plain and Warren bioregions of south-western Western Australia.

== Conservation status ==
Andersonia involucrata is listed as "not threatened" by the Government of Western Australia Department of Biodiversity, Conservation and Attractions.
