= Grovesinia pyramidalis =

Scientific classification
- Kingdom: Fungi
- Division: Ascomycota
- Class: Leotiomycetes
- Order: Helotiales
- Family: Sclerotiniaceae
- Genus: Grovesinia
- Species: G. pyramidalis

Binomial name
- Grovesinia pyramidalis M.N. Cline, (1983)

Synonyms
- Botrytis moricola I. Hino; Cristulariella moricola (I. Hino) (1980); Cristulariella pyramidalis Waterman & R.P. Marshall, (1947)

Species of fungus

Grovesinia pyramidalis is a plant pathogen.
