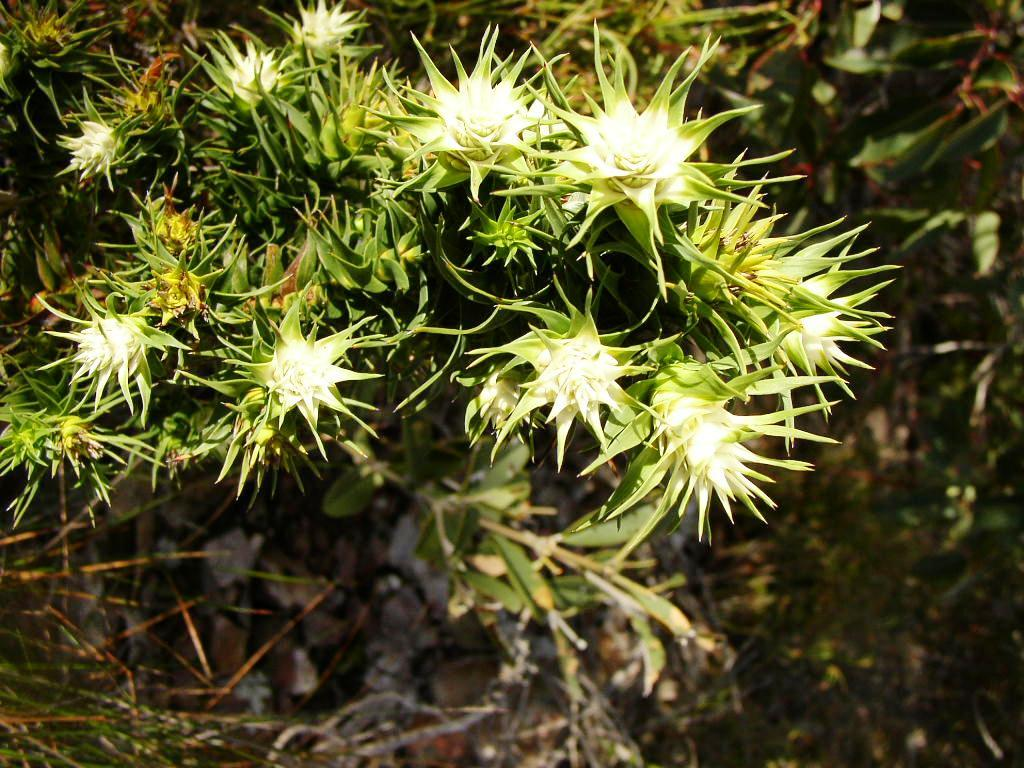
- In the Stirling Range National Park

Conservation status
- Priority Four — Rare Taxa (DEC)

Scientific classification
- Kingdom: Plantae
- Clade: Tracheophytes
- Clade: Angiosperms
- Clade: Eudicots
- Clade: Asterids
- Order: Ericales
- Family: Ericaceae
- Genus: Andersonia
- Species: A. echinocephala

Binomial name
- Andersonia echinocephala (Stschegl.) Druce

Synonyms
- Andersonia echinocephala (Stschegl.) Domin isonym; Andersonia patricia F.Muell. nom. inval., pro syn.; Andersonia patricia (F.Muell.) F.Muell. ex Benth.; Sphincterostoma echinocephalum Stschegl.; Sprengelia patricia F.Muell.

= Andersonia echinocephala =

Species of flowering plant

Andersonia echinocephala is a species of flowering plant in the family Ericaceae and is endemic to the south of Western Australia. It is an erect, rigid shrub with lance-shaped leaves and heads of up to 15 or more, white or cream-soloured flowers.

== Description ==
Andersonia echinocephala is an erect, robust, rigid shrub that typically grows to a height of up to 0.3–1.5 m (1 ft 0 in – 4 ft 11 in). Its leaves are lance-shaped, 2–7 mm (0.079–0.276 in) long and increase in size to the bracts. The leaves are twisted, wavy, usually grooved and glabrous. The flowers are arranged in heads of sometimes more than 15 on the ends of branches with sharply-pointed bracts that are mostly much longer than the flowers, and bracteoles that are shorter than the sepals. The sepals are about 9 mm (0.35 in) long and usually glabrous. The petals are white or cream-coloured and form a tube with lobes about twice as long as the petal tube. The stamens are shorter than the petals, but extend beyond the petal tube. Flowering occurs from September to November.

== Taxonomy ==
This species was first formally described in 1859 by Sergei Sergeyevich Sheglejev, who gave it the name Sphincterostoma echinocephalum in the Bulletin de la Société impériale des Naturalistes de Moscou from specimens collected by James Drummond. In 1917, George Claridge Druce transferred the species to Andersonia as A. echinocephala. The specific epithet (echinocephala) means 'hedge hog-headed'.

== Distribution and habitat ==
This species of Andersonia grows in rocky soils on slopes and summits mostly in the Stirling Range and Fitzgerald River National Parks in the Esperance Plains and Mallee bioregions of southern Western Australia.

== Conservation status ==
Andersonia carinata is listed as "Priority Four" by the Government of Western Australia Department of Biodiversity, Conservation and Attractions, meaning that is rare or near threatened.
