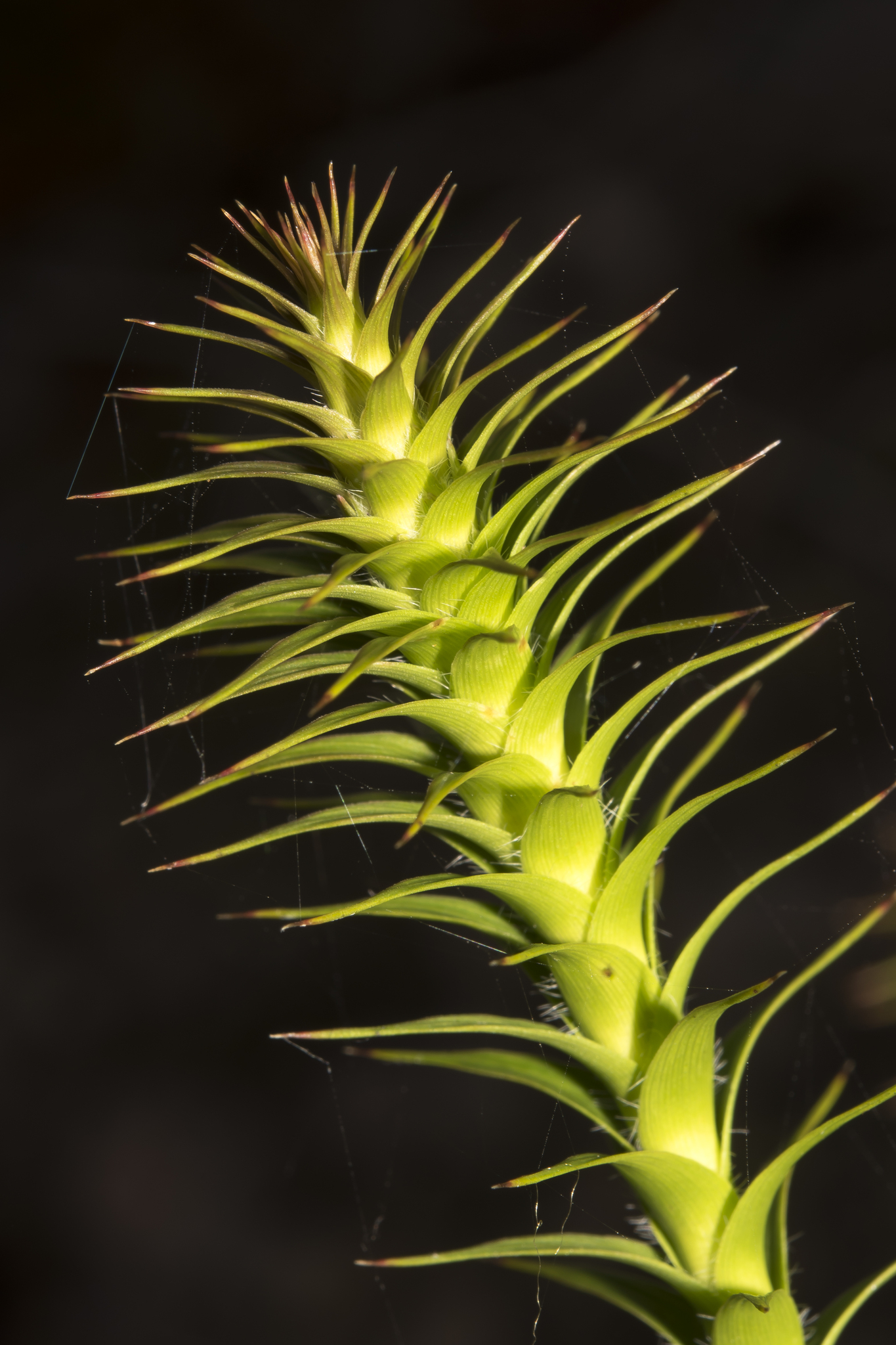

Conservation status
- Declared rare (DEC)

Scientific classification
- Kingdom: Plantae
- Clade: Tracheophytes
- Clade: Angiosperms
- Clade: Eudicots
- Clade: Asterids
- Order: Ericales
- Family: Ericaceae
- Genus: Andersonia
- Species: A. axilliflora

Binomial name
- Andersonia axilliflora (Stschegl.) Druce

= Andersonia axilliflora =

Species of flowering plant

Andersonia axilliflora, commonly known as giant andersonia, is a species of flowering plant in the family Ericaceae and is endemic to southern Western Australia. It is an erect, rigid shrub with glabrous, lance-shaped leaves and creamy-white flowers.

== Description ==
Andersonia axilliflora is an erect, rigid, robust shrub that typically grows to a height of 0.6–2 m (2 ft 0 in – 6 ft 7 in) and often higher. Its leaves are lance-shaped, 20–55 mm (0.79–2.17 in) long and 8–15 mm (0.31–0.59 in) wide, sometimes wavy and twisted. The flowers are borne on the ends of branches with often more than 30 flowers with lance-shaped bracts and bracteoles often as long as the sepals. The sepals are up to 12 mm (0.47 in) long and creamy-white. The petals are slightly shorter than the sepals, creamy-white, with lobes about twice as long as the petal tube. The stamens are three-quarters as long as the petals with anthers about 6 mm (0.24 in) long.

== Taxonomy ==
This species was first formally described in 1859 by Sergei Sergeyevich Sheglejev who gave it the name Sphincterostoma axilliflorum in the Bulletin de la Société Impériale des Naturalistes de Moscou from specimens collected by James Drummond. In 1917, George Claridge Druce transferred the species to Andersonia as A. axilliflora in The Botanical Exchange Club and Society of the British Isles Report for 1916. The specific epithet (axilliflora) means 'axil-flowered'.

== Distribution and habitat ==
Giant andersonia grows on rocky slopes or outcrops at higher altitudes in the Stirling Range in the Esperance Plains bioregion of southern Western Australia.

== Conservation status ==
Andersonia axilliflora is listed as "Threatened Flora (Declared Rare Flora — Extant)" by the Government of Western Australia Department of Biodiversity, Conservation and Attractions meaning that it is in danger of extinction.
