= Andersonia annelsii =

Conservation status
- Declared rare (DEC)

Scientific classification
- Kingdom: Plantae
- Clade: Tracheophytes
- Clade: Angiosperms
- Clade: Eudicots
- Clade: Asterids
- Order: Ericales
- Family: Ericaceae
- Genus: Andersonia
- Species: A. annelsii

Binomial name
- Andersonia annelsii Lemson

Species of flowering plant

Andersonia annelsii is a species of flowering plant in the family Ericaceae and is endemic to a restricted part of the southwest of Western Australia. It is a low shrub with egg-shaped to round leaves and white, tube-shaped flowers.

== Description ==
Andersonia annelsii is a low shrub that typically grows to a height of 15–25 cm (5.9–9.8 in) and has low-lying stems. The leaves are widely egg-shaped to round, 2–5 mm (0.079–0.197 in) in diameter. The flowers are arranged in clusters of 3 to 8 with sepals that are linear, 10.0–12.0 mm (0.39–0.47 in) long, yellow to pink in bud, later white. The petals are tube-shaped, 11–14 mm (0.43–0.55 in) long and white with lobes turned back or rolled back and 4–5 mm (0.16–0.20 in) long. The stamens are 9.0–11.0 mm (0.35–0.43 in) long, the anthers white or yellow.

== Taxonomy ==
Andersonia annelsii was first formally described in 2007 by Kristina L. Lemson in the journal Nuytsia from specimens collected in the Manjimup area in 1990. The specific epithet (annelsii) honours the botanist Tony Annels.

== Distribution and habitat ==
This species of Andersonia grows in sandy loam near granite rocks and is only known from the Tone-Perup Nature Reserve near Manjimup.

== Conservation status ==
Andersonia annelsii is listed as threatened flora under the Wildlife Conservation (Rare Flora) Notice 2018 and the Biodiversity Conservation Act 2016.
