= Andersonia pinaster =

Conservation status
- Declared rare (DEC)

Scientific classification
- Kingdom: Plantae
- Clade: Tracheophytes
- Clade: Angiosperms
- Clade: Eudicots
- Clade: Asterids
- Order: Ericales
- Family: Ericaceae
- Genus: Andersonia
- Species: A. pinaster

Binomial name
- Andersonia pinaster Lemson

Species of flowering plant

Andersonia pinaster is a species of flowering plant in the family Ericaceae and is endemic to the south of Western Australia. It is a slender, erect, pine-like shrub with twisted, narrowly egg-shaped to almost linear leaves and bright blue, tube-shaped flowers.

== Description ==
Andersonia pinaster is a slender, erect, pine-like shrub, that typically grows up to 0.5–1 m (1 ft 8 in – 3 ft 3 in) high. The leaves are twisted, narrowly egg-shaped to almost linear, and 10–20 mm (0.39–0.79 in) long. The flowers are arranged on the ends of branches, hidden by leaf-like appendages until the flowers open, the sepals narrowly egg-shaped, 9.5–14 mm (0.37–0.55 in) long and green. The petals are bright blue and form a narrowly urn-shaped tube 9.5–14 mm (0.37–0.55 in) long with widely spreading lobes 5.8–8 mm (0.23–0.31 in) long with soft hairs that form a tuft at the end of the lobe. The stamens are 6.2–10 mm (0.24–0.39 in) long, the anthers white, 1.3–2.0 mm (0.051–0.079 in) long. Flowering occurs from July to September.

== Taxonomy ==
Andersonia pinaster was first formally described in 2007 by Kristina L. Lemson in the journal Nuytsia from specimens collected near Betty's Beach by Greg Keighery in 1986. The specific epithet (pinaster) refers to the habit of mature plants, which resemble a small pine tree.

== Distribution and habitat ==
This species of Andersonia grows in low heath in Two Peoples Bay Nature Reserve in the Jarrah Forest bioregion of southern Western Australia.

== Conservation status ==
Andersonia pinaster is listed as "Threatened Flora (Declared Rare Flora — Extant)" by the Government of Western Australia Department of Biodiversity, Conservation and Attractions.
