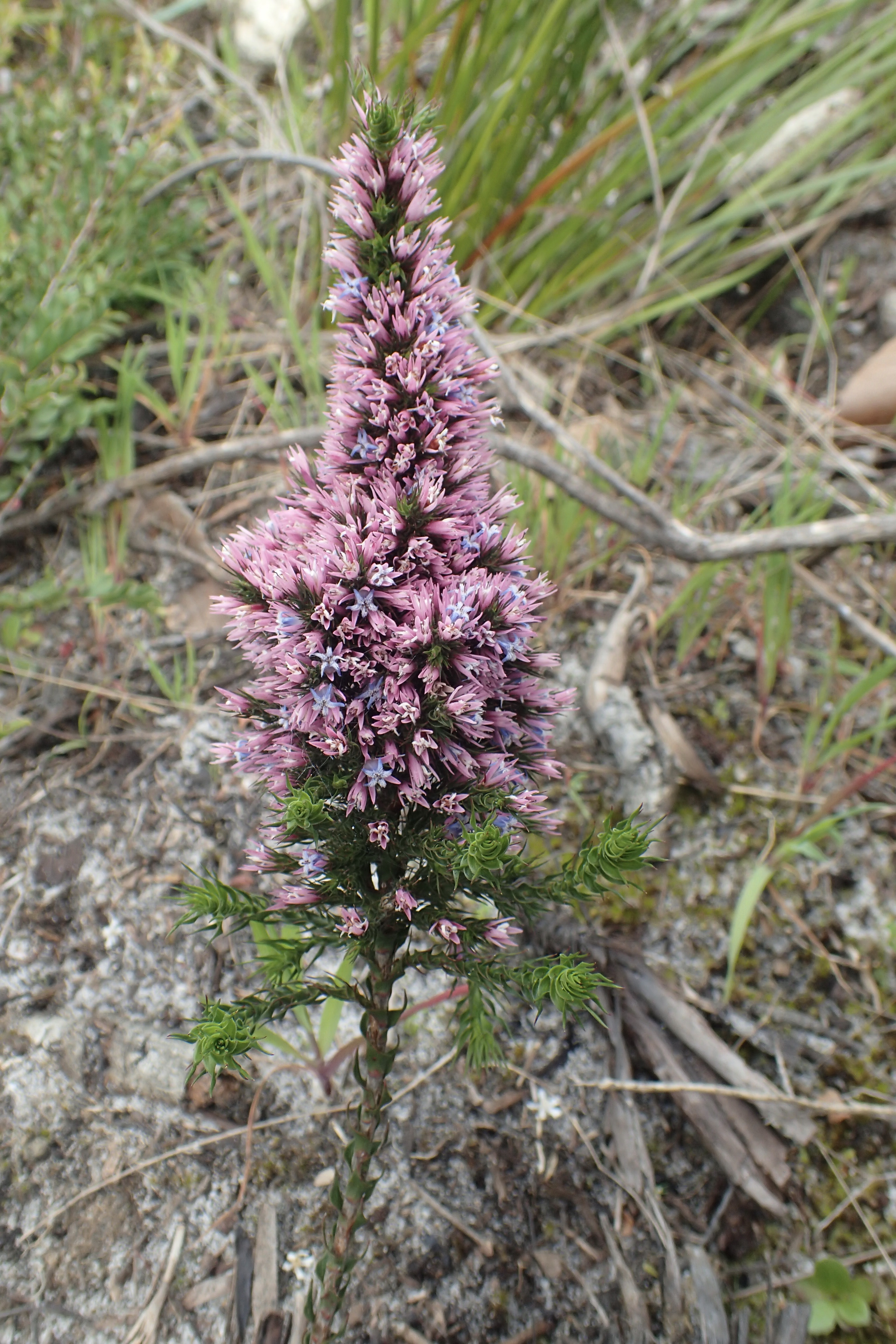
- In the Chorkerup Nature Reserve, near Narrikup

Scientific classification
- Kingdom: Plantae
- Clade: Tracheophytes
- Clade: Angiosperms
- Clade: Eudicots
- Clade: Asterids
- Order: Ericales
- Family: Ericaceae
- Genus: Andersonia
- Species: A. caerulea

Binomial name
- Andersonia caerulea R.Br.

Synonyms
- List: Andersonia brachyanthera F.Muell. nom. inval., pro syn.; Andersonia brachyanthera (F.Muell.) Benth.; Andersonia coerulea R.Br. orth. var.; Andersonia depressa var. ciliata Benth.; Andersonia lanuginosa A.Cunn. ex DC.; Andersonia prostrata Sond.; Andersonia squarrosa R.Br.; Andersonia subulata Benth.; Sprengelia brachyanthera F.Muell.; Sprengelia caerulea (R.Br.) F.Muell.; Sprengelia coerulea F.Muell. orth. var.

= Andersonia caerulea =

Species of flowering plant

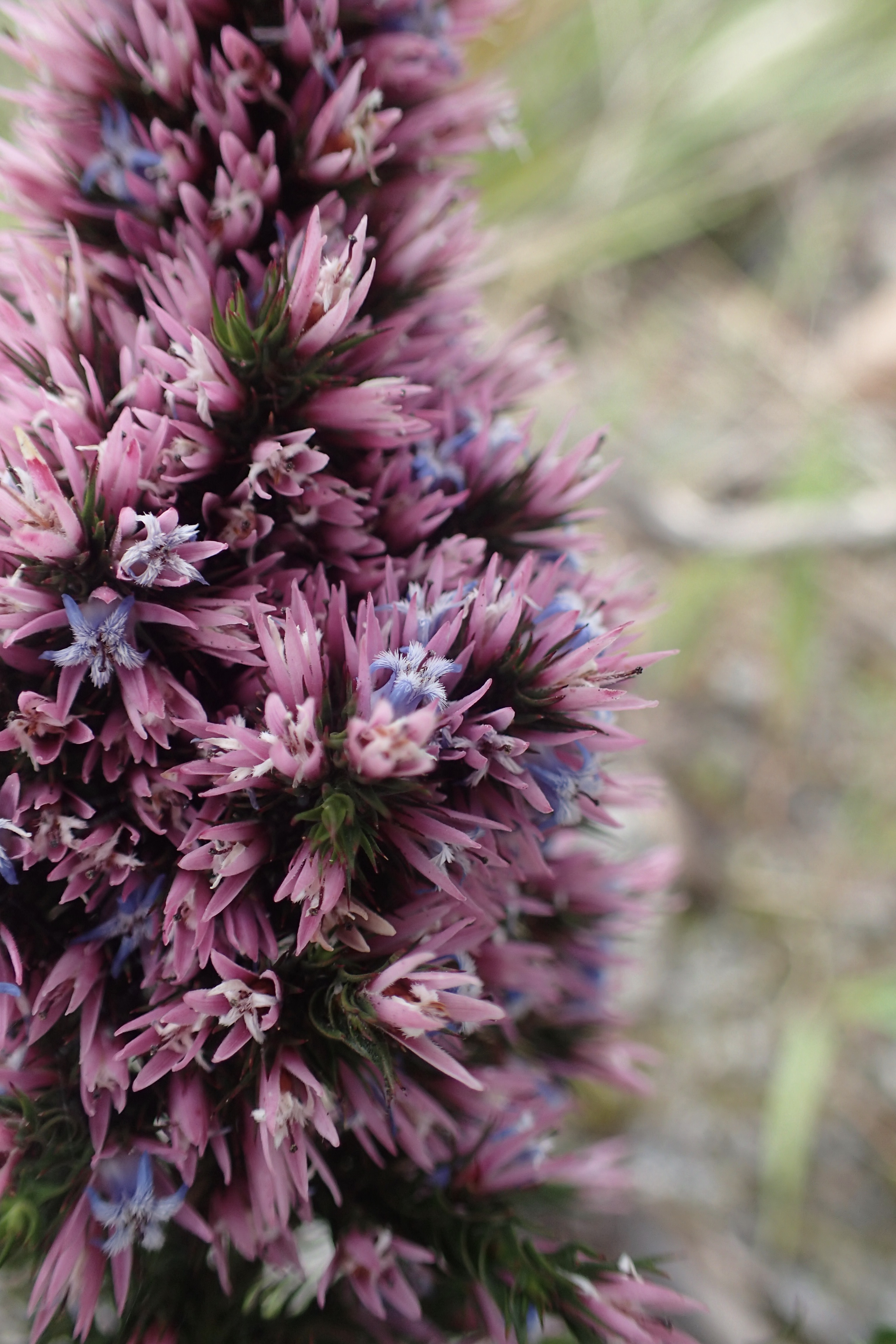
Flower detail

Andersonia caerulea, commonly known as foxtails, is a species of flowering plant in the family Ericaceae and is endemic to the southwest of Western Australia. It is an erect or spreading to low-lying shrub with variably-shaped leaves and pink and pale blue flowers, sometimes in spike-like groups.

== Description ==
Andersonia caerulea is an erect, or spreading to low-lying shrub that typically grows to a height of 0.05–1 m (2.0 in – 3 ft 3.4 in). Taller, erect plants have flowers arranged in a compact spike, but low-lying plants have flowers arranged otherwise. The leaves are variable in shape and size, egg-shaped to lance-shaped or linear, sometimes twisted or wavy, sometimes with a pointed tip, variably hairy or glabrous. There are 15 to 25 leaves or bracteoles at the base of the flower, the sepals 5–12 mm (0.20–0.47 in) long and longer than the bracteoles. The sepals are lance-shaped, pink, lilac, or pale blue and the petals are shorter than the sepals, usually pale blue, and densely bearded inside the petal tube.

== Taxonomy ==
Andersonia caerulea was first formally described in 1810 by Robert Brown in his Prodromus Florae Novae Hollandiae from specimens he collected at King George Sound in 1801. The specific epithet (caerulea) means "deep sky-blue".

== Distribution and habitat ==
Foxtails grows in sandy soil and is widespread in the south-west of Western Australia, occurring in the Avon Wheatbelt, Esperance Plains, Jarrah Forest, Mallee, Swan Coastal Plain and Warren bioregions.
