= Andersonia redolens =

Conservation status
- Priority Two — Poorly Known Taxa (DEC)

Scientific classification
- Kingdom: Plantae
- Clade: Tracheophytes
- Clade: Angiosperms
- Clade: Eudicots
- Clade: Asterids
- Order: Ericales
- Family: Ericaceae
- Genus: Andersonia
- Species: A. redolens

Binomial name
- Andersonia redolens Lemson

Species of flowering plant

Andersonia redolens is a species of flowering plant in the family Ericaceae and is endemic to the south of Western Australia. It is an open shrub with low-lying stems, twisted, narrowly egg-shaped to almost linear leaves and white or cream-coloured, tube-shaped flowers.

== Description ==
Andersonia redolens is an open shrub with low-lying stems, that typically grows up to 30 cm (12 in) high and 50 cm (20 in) wide. The leaves are spreading, twisted, narrowly egg-shaped to almost linear, the longest leaves 6.9–15 mm (0.27–0.59 in) long and 1.0–3.0 mm (0.039–0.118 in) wide. The flowers are arranged in leaf axils in pendent groups of three to ten, with glabrous, leaf-like appendages 6.0–9.0 mm (0.24–0.35 in) long. The sepals are narrowly egg-shaped, 8.0–11.5 mm (0.31–0.45 in) long and pale pink or creamy-white. The petals are white or cream-coloured and form a cylindrical or very narrowly urn-shaped tube 7.0–10.6 mm (0.28–0.42 in) long with erect lobes 4.5–6.6 mm (0.18–0.26 in) long with soft hairs that form a tuft at the end of the lobes. The stamens are 6.5–8.0 mm (0.26–0.31 in) long, the anthers white or violet, 2.2–2.2 mm (0.087–0.087 in) long. Flowering occurs in September and October.

== Taxonomy ==
Andersonia redolens was first formally described in 2007 by Kristina L. Lemson in the journal Nuytsia from specimens collected in Mount Frankland National Park in 1994. The specific epithet (redolens) means 'scented', and refers to the fragrance of the flowers.

== Distribution and habitat ==
This species of Andersonia grows on the edges of swamps and in sand in open woodland, and is only known from type location north of Walpole and one other nearby site, in the Warren bioregion of southern Western Australia.

== Conservation status ==
Andersonia redolens is listed as "Priority Two" by the Western Australian Government Department of Biodiversity, Conservation and Attractions, meaning that it is poorly known and from only one or a few locations.
