= William Anderson (horticulturist) =

Scottish horticulturist

William Anderson (1766–1846), was a Scottish horticulturist.

Anderson was born in Easter Warrington, Edinburgh in Scotland, his father having been, just previous to the rising of 1745, forester and gardener to a Jacobite laird in the western highlands, who had some share in favouring the escape of Charles Edward Stuart. About 1790 he entered upon gardening work in some nurseries near Edinburgh, and subsequently made his way to London, where he became gardener to James Vere, of Kensington Gore, a wealthy silk merchant who had a large collection of plants.

In 1814 he was appointed by the Society of Apothecaries gardener—a title changed during his occupancy of the office to curator—of their botanic garden at Chelsea, a post which he filled until his death. He at once set to work to raise the garden from the state of neglect into which it had fallen, and his efforts were attended with great success. He was said to be tall and burly, somewhat rough in manners and appearance, but warm-hearted and charitable. He was elected an associate of the Linnean Society in 1798, and became a fellow in 1815; he contributed various papers on horticultural subjects to the Gardener's Magazine and Horticultural Society's Transactions. He died at Chelsea, 6 October 1846, and is buried in the churchyard of the old church.
