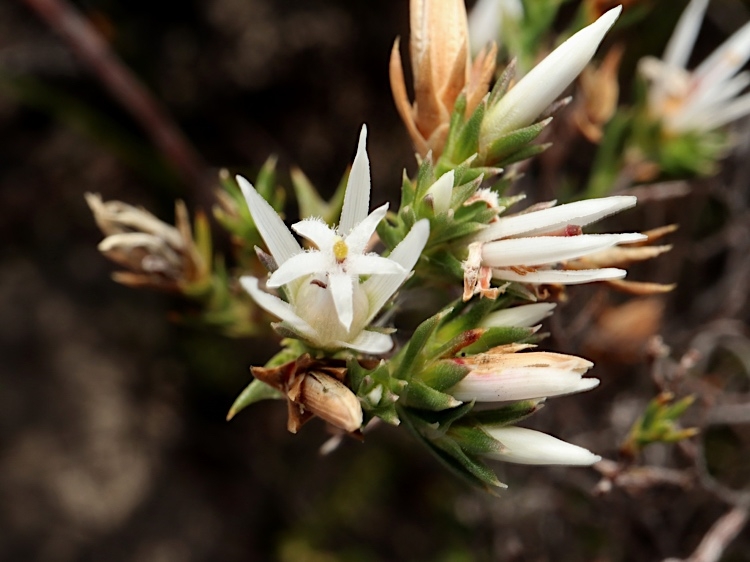

Scientific classification
- Kingdom: Plantae
- Clade: Tracheophytes
- Clade: Angiosperms
- Clade: Eudicots
- Clade: Asterids
- Order: Ericales
- Family: Ericaceae
- Genus: Andersonia
- Species: A. heterophylla

Binomial name
- Andersonia heterophylla Sond.

= Andersonia heterophylla =

Species of flowering plant

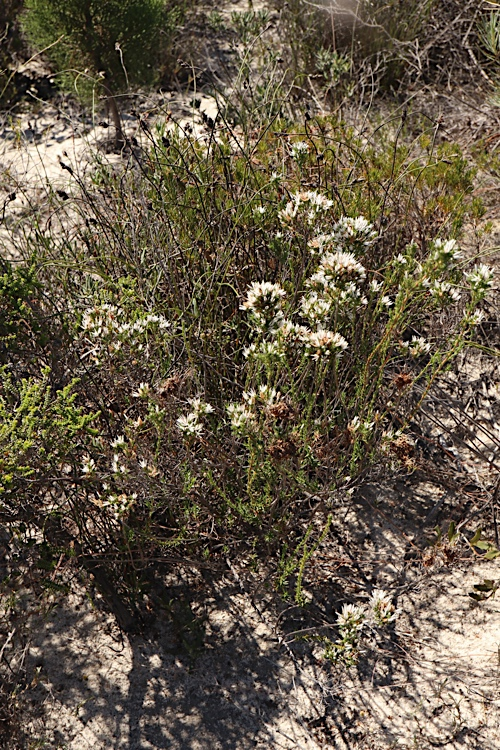
Habit near the Brand Highway, south of Eneabba

Andersonia heterophylla is a species of flowering plant in the family Ericaceae and is endemic to the south-west of Western Australia. It is an erect or ascending shrub with egg-shaped to more or less linear leaves and white or pink flowers.

== Description ==
Andersonia heterophylla is an erect or ascending shrub that typically grows to a height of up to 10–50 cm (3.9–19.7 in). Its leaves are egg-shaped with a pointed tip to more or less linear, 1–6 mm (0.039–0.236 in) long and 0.5–2 mm (0.020–0.079 in) wide. The flowers have about twelve leaves and leaf-like bracteoles on their stalks, the uppermost about half as long as the sepals. The sepals are lance-shaped or oblong, 4–6 mm (0.16–0.24 in) long and usually hairy. The petals are white or pink, forming a tube shorter than the sepals, with lobes longer than the petal tube and densely bearded inside. The stamens are longer than the petal tube, the anthers linear and tapered near the base.

== Taxonomy ==
Andersonia heterophylla was first formally described in 1845 by Otto Wilhelm Sonder in Lehmann's Plantae Preissianae from specimens collected in the Darling Range in 1839. The specific epithet (heterophylla) means 'different-' or 'unequal-leaved'.

== Distribution and habitat ==
This species of Andersonia grows in open heath in sandy soils between Jurien Bay, Perth and inland to Mogumber in the Avon Wheatbelt, Geraldton Sandplains, Jarrah Forest and Swan Coastal Plain bioregions of south-western Western Australia.

== Conservation status ==
Andersonia heterophylla is listed as "not threatened" by the Government of Western Australia Department of Biodiversity, Conservation and Attractions.
