= Kew Bulletin =

- Discipline: Plant and fungal taxonomy
- Language: English
- Edited by: Timothy M. A. Utteridge

Publication details
- Former name(s): Kew Bulletin of Miscellaneous Information, Bulletin of Miscellaneous Information (Royal Botanic Gardens, Kew)
- History: 1887–present
- Publisher: Springer Science+Business Media on behalf of the Royal Botanic Gardens, Kew (England)
- Frequency: Quarterly

Standard abbreviations
- ISO 4: Kew Bull.

Indexing
- CODEN: KEWBAF
- ISSN: 0075-5974 (print); 1874-933X (web)
- LCCN: 52017093
- JSTOR: 00755974
- OCLC no.: 314003070

Links
- Journal homepage; Online access; Journal page on Kew Gardens website

The Kew Bulletin is a quarterly peer-reviewed scientific journal on plant and fungal taxonomy and conservation published by Springer Science+Business Media on behalf of the Royal Botanic Gardens, Kew. Articles on palynology, cytology, anatomy, phytogeography, and phytochemistry that relate to taxonomy are also included.

The journal was established in 1887 as the Kew Bulletin of Miscellaneous Information by William Turner Thiselton-Dyer, then director of the Royal Botanic Gardens, Kew. It sought to facilitate communication between botanists at Kew and distant parts of the British Empire, and prioritised study of information of economic importance.

== Abstracting and indexing ==
The journal is abstracted and indexed in:

- Academic OneFile
- Biological Abstracts
- BIOSIS Previews
- CAB Abstracts
- CAB International
- Elsevier BIOBASE
- EMBiology
- Expanded Academic
- GeoRef
- Science Citation Index Expanded
- Scopus
- The Zoological Record
