= List of Helotiales genera incertae sedis =

The Helotiales are an order of fungi in the phylum Ascomycota. Many species are plant pathogens. The following list of Helotiales genera have not been placed with any certainty (incertae sedis) into a family.

- Acidea Hujslova & M.Kolarık – 1 sp.
- Acidomelania E.Walsh & N.Zhang – 1 sp.
- Adelodiscus Syd. – 1 sp.
- Algincola Velen. – 1 sp.
- Amylocarpus Curr. – 1 sp.
- Angelina Fr. – 1 sp.
- Aphanodesmium Réblová & Hern.-Restr. – 1 sp.
- Apiculospora Wijayaw., Camporesi, A.J.L.Phillips & K.D.Hyde – 1 sp.
- Aquadiscula Shearer & J.L.Crane – 2 spp.
- Aquapoterium Raja & Shearer – 1 sp.
- Ascluella DiCosmo, Nag Raj & W.B.Kendr. – 1 sp.
- Ascoclavulina Otani – 8 spp.
- Banksiamyces G.Beaton – 4 spp.
- Belonioscyphella Hohn. – 4 spp.
- Benguetia Syd. & P.Syd. – 1 sp.
- Bioscypha Syd. – 2 spp.
- Brachyalara Reblova & W.Gams – 1 sp.
- Brefeldochium Verkley – 1 sp.
- Bulgariella P.Karst. – 4 spp.
- Bulgariopsis Henn. – 2 spp.
- Calycellinopsis W.Y.Zhuang – 1 sp.
- Capillipes R.Sant. – 1 sp.
- Capricola Velen. – 1 sp.
- Cashiella Petr. – 3 spp.
- Cejpia Velen. – 3 spp.
- Cenangiumella J.Frohl. & K.D.Hyde – 1 sp.
- Chloroepilichen Etayo – 1 sp.
- Chlorospleniella P.Karst. – 1 sp.
- Chondroderris Maire – 1 sp.
- Ciliella Sacc. & P.Syd. – 1 sp.
- Cistella Quel. – 50 spp.
- Clathrosporium Nawawi & Kuthub. – 1 sp.
- Coleosperma Ingold – 1 sp.
- Colipila Baral & Guy Garcıa – 2 spp.
- Comesia Sacc. – 3 spp.
- Cornuntum Velen. – 1 sp.
- Coronellaria P.Karst. – 4 spp.
- Criserosphaeria Speg. – 1 sp.
- Crocicreas Fr. – 4 spp.
- Crucellisporium M.L.Farr – 3 spp.
- Crumenella P.Karst. – 1 sp.
- Cryptohymenium Samuels & L.M.Kohn – 1 sp.
- Cryptopezia Hohn. – 1 sp.
- Dactylaria Sacc. – 100)
- Dawsicola Dobbeler – 1 sp.
- Dermateopsis Nannf. – 2 spp.
- Didonia Velen. – 5 spp.
- Didymascella Maire & Sacc. – 5 spp.
- Discomycella Hohn. – 1 sp.
- Durella Tul. & C.Tul. – 22 spp.
- Echinodiscus Etayo & Diederich – 2 spp.
- Encoeliopsis Nannf. – 4 spp.
- Episclerotium L.M.Kohn – 2 spp.
- Erikssonopsis M.Morelet – 1 sp.
- Fulvoflamma Crous – 1 sp.
- Gloeopeziza Zukal – 8 spp.
- Gloeotinia M. Wilson, Noble & E.G. Gray - 1 sp.
- Godroniopsis Diehl & E.K.Cash – 3 spp.
- Gorgoniceps (P.Karst.) P.Karst. – 3 spp.
- Grimmicola Dobbeler & Hertel – 1 sp.
- Grovesia Dennis – 1 sp.
- Hemiglossum Pat. – 2 spp.
- Humicolopsis Cabral & S.Marchand – 2 spp.
- Hydrocina Scheuer – 1 sp.
- Hymenobolus Durieu & Mont. – 3 spp.
- Hyphoscypha Velen. – 1 sp.
- Hysteronaevia Nannf. – 12 spp.
- Hysteropezizella Hohn. – 26 spp.
- Hysterostegiella Hohn. – 10 spp.
- Infundichalara Reblova & W.Gams – 2 spp.
- Involucroscypha Raitv. – 10 spp.
- Jacobsonia Boedijn – 1 sp.
- Korfia J.Reid & Cain – 1 sp.
- Larissia Raitv. – 1 sp.
- Lasseria Dennis – 1 sp.
- Lemalis Fr. – 3 spp.
- Libartania Nag Raj – 2 spp.
- Livia Velen. – 1 sp.
- Masseea Sacc. – 4 spp.
- Melanopeziza Velen. – 1 sp.
- Merodontis Clem. – 1 sp.
- Microdiscus Sacc. – 1 sp.
- Mitrulinia Spooner – 1 sp.
- Monochaetiellopsis B.Sutton & DiCosmo – 2 spp.
- Mycosphaerangium Verkley – 3 spp.
- Obconicum Velen. – 2 spp.
- Obscurodiscus Raitv. – 1 sp.
- Orbiliopsis (Sacc. & D.Sacc.) Syd. & P.Syd. – 2 spp.
- Otwaya G.Beaton – 12 spp.
- Pachydisca Boud. – 32 spp.
- Parencoelia Petr. – 4 spp.
- Patinellaria H.Karst. – 1 sp.
- Peltigeromyces A.Möller – 3 spp.
- Pestalopezia Seaver – 3 spp.
- Pezolepis Syd. – 2 spp.
- Pezomela Syd. – 1 sp.
- Phacidiella P. Karst. – 1 sp.
- Phaeofabraea Rehm – 1 sp.
- Phaeopyxis Rambold & Triebel – 1 sp.
- Phragmonaevia Rehm – 16 spp.
- Phyllopezis
- Piceomphale Svrček – 1 sp.
- Pleoscutula Vou. – 3 spp.
- Podophacidium Niessl – 2 spp.
- Polydesmia Boud. – 7 spp.
- Polyphilus D.G.Knapp, Ashrafi, W.Maier & Kovács – 2 spp.
- Populomyces Hern.-Restr. – 1 sp.
- Potridiscus Dobbeler & Triebel – 1 sp.
- Pseudohelotium Fuckel – 50 spp.
- Pseudolachnum Velen. – 1 sp.
- Pseudomitrula Gamundı – 1 sp.
- Pseudopeltis L.Holm & K.Holm – 1 sp.
- Pseudotryblidium Rehm – 1 sp.
- Psilophana Syd. – 1 sp.
- Psilothecium Clem. – 1 sp.
- Pteromyces E.Bommer, M.Rousseau & Sacc. – 1 sp.
- Pubigera Baral, Gminder & Svrček – 1 sp.
- Radotinea E.Bommer, M.Rousseau & Sacc. – 1 sp.
- Rhexocercosporidium U.Braun – 2 spp.
- Rhizocladosporium Crous & U.Braun – 1 sp.
- Rhizothyrium Naumov – 1 sp.
- Riedera Fr. – 1 sp.
- Rommelaarsia Baral & Haelew. – 1 sp.
- Roseodiscus Baral – 4 spp.
- Sageria A.Funk – 1 sp.
- Sambucina Velen. – 1 sp.
- Sarcomyces Massee – 1 sp.
- Sclerocrana Samuels & L.M.Kohn – 4 spp.
- Scutulopsis Velen. – 1 sp.
- Soosiella Hujslova & M. Kolarık – 1 sp.
- Sorokina Sacc. – 1 sp.
- Sorokinella J.Frohl. & K.D.Hyde – 2 spp.
- Spirosphaera Beverw. – 8 spp.
- Stamnaria Fuckel – 7 spp.
- Stilbopeziza Speg. – 1 sp.
- Strossmayeria Schulzer – 20 spp.
- Tetracladium De Wild. – 10 spp.
- Thedgonia B.Sutton – 6 spp.
- Themisia Velen. – 8 spp.
- Tovariella Syd. – 1 sp.
- Trichohelotium Killerm. – 2 spp.
- Triposporium Corda – 14 spp.
- Unguicularia Hohn. – 7 spp.
- Urceolella Boud. – 44)
- Vandijckella Sand.-Den. – 1 sp.
- Waltonia Saho – 1 sp.
- Woodiella Sacc. & P.Syd. – 3 spp.
- Xeromedulla Korf & W.Y. Zhuang – 3 spp.
- Zugazaea Korf, Iturr. & Lizoň – 1 sp.
