= Sooty mold =

Name for several species of fungus

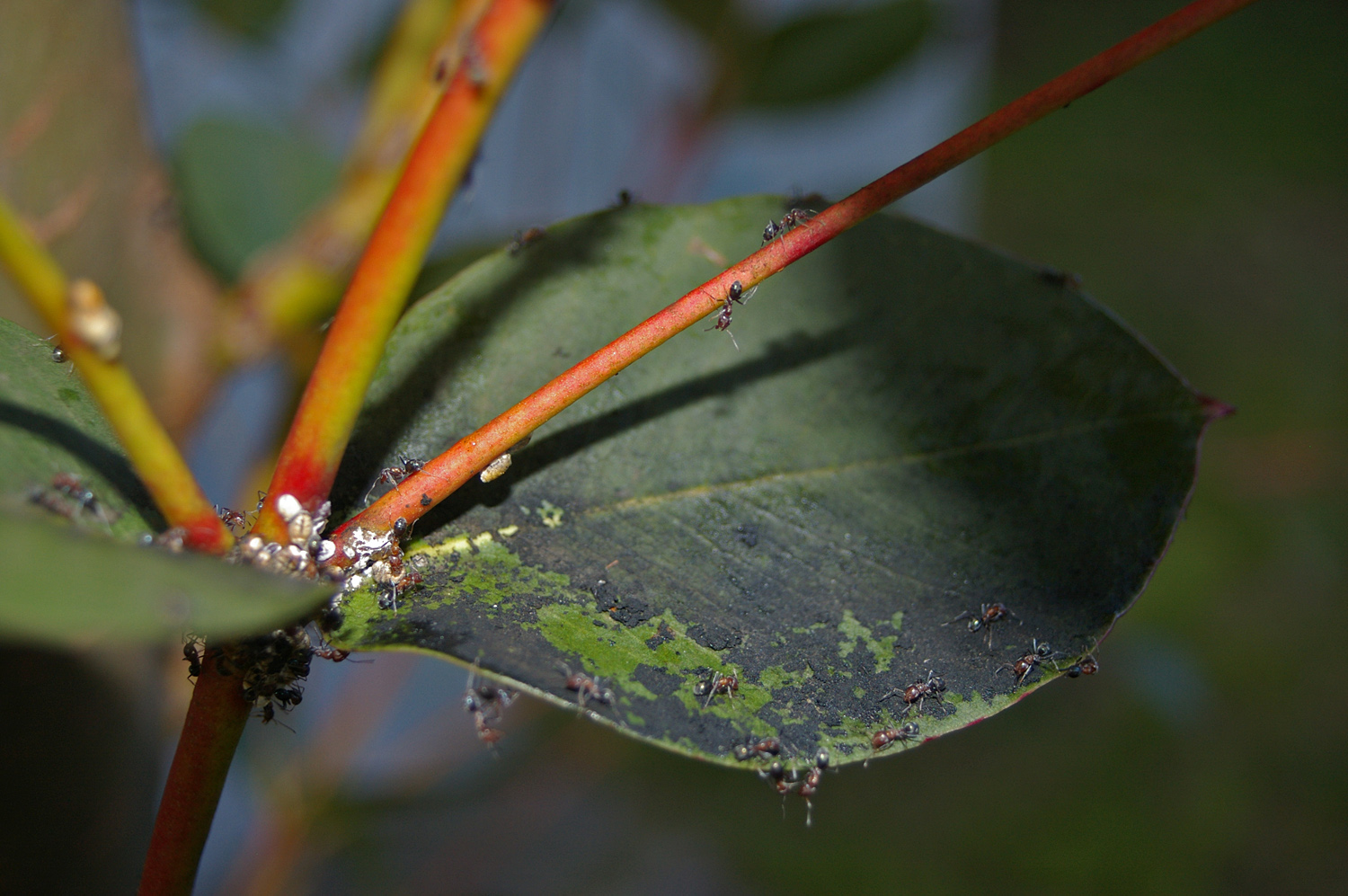
Sooty mold caused by scale on a Eucalyptus dives

Sooty mold (also spelled sooty mould) is a collective term for different Ascomycete fungi, which includes many genera, commonly Cladosporium and Alternaria. It grows on plants and their fruit, but also environmental objects, like fences, garden furniture, stones, and even cars. The mold benefits from either a sugary exudate produced by the plant or fruit, or honeydew-secreting insects or sap suckers the plant may be infested by.

Sooty mold itself does little if any harm to the plant. Treatment is indicated when the mold is combined with an insect infestation.

== Description ==
Sooty mold is a collective, self-descriptive term for a number of different fungi. It is a black, powdery coating adhering to plants and their fruit or environmental objects.

=== Biology ===
The ecology of the different species, their interactions, relationship to the host are barely understood. A chance observation of a Microcyclospora tardicrescens inhibiting the growth of the fruit pathogen Colletotrichum fioriniae in dual culture tests, yielded trichothecolone acetate and its (S)-7-hydroxy derivative as active principles for the interaction between M. tardicrescens and C. fioriniae.

Common genera of sooty mold fungi found are Aethaloderma, Capnodium, Cladosporium, Euantennaria, Scorias, and Trichomerium.

Other genera found in sooty mold are Mycosphaerella, Aureobasidium, Vishniacozyma, Sarcinomyces, Sarocladium, Alternaria, and Erythrobasidium.

Sooty mold grows particularly well on plants which produce a sugary exudate, if they are infested by honeydew secreting insects such as aphids, scales and the whitefly, or when infested by insects that suck sap from the host plant.

== Plants commonly affected ==
Sooty mold is commonly seen on the leaves of ornamental plants such as azaleas, gardenias, camellias, crepe myrtles, Mangifera and laurels. Karuka is affected by sooty mold caused by Meliola juttingii. Plants located under pecan or hickory trees are particularly susceptible to sooty mold, because honeydew-secreting insects often inhabit these trees. The honeydew can rain down on neighboring and understory plants. Citrus may occasionally exude sweet sticky secretions and sooty molds can grow on these.

== Effect ==
The fungus itself does little harm to the plant. It merely blocks sunlight, and very rarely may stunt a plant's growth and yellow its foliage. Thus, sooty mold is essentially a cosmetic problem in the garden, as it is unsightly and can coat most of a plant in a matter of days or weeks.

== Control ==
The simplest form of non-chemical control is to wipe and wash affected plant parts with tepid water and soap, insecticidal soap or dish soap, one tablespoon per gallon of water; strong soaps or detergents may damage the plant. This can also be sprayed if the plant is large, but it is much less effective than when combined with physical removal. After allowing the soap to sit for a while, the sooty mold is rinsed off with water. Sooty mold will regrow, unless the underlying reason for its growth is eliminated.

Chemical control of sooty mold itself is not needed. If sap-sucking pests are responsible for the honeydew on which the mold is growing, there are several options:

Using formulations of neem oil, which is an organic broad spectrum pesticide, insecticide, fungicide and miticide controls mites and insects such as whitefly, aphid, scale, and mealy bugs, and additional fungus diseases like black spot, rust, mildew, and scab. Neem oil can be used on house plants, flowers, vegetables, trees, shrubs and fruit indoors and outdoors. Neem oil is biodegradable and has not been shown to be toxic to mammals, birds, bees, earthworms, or beneficial insects.

Synthetic insecticides such as the organophosphates acephate (orthene), malathion, or diazinon can be used in severe cases, but the labels should be viewed for approved crops and the number of days to wait to harvest.

== See also ==
- Sooty blotch and flyspeck
