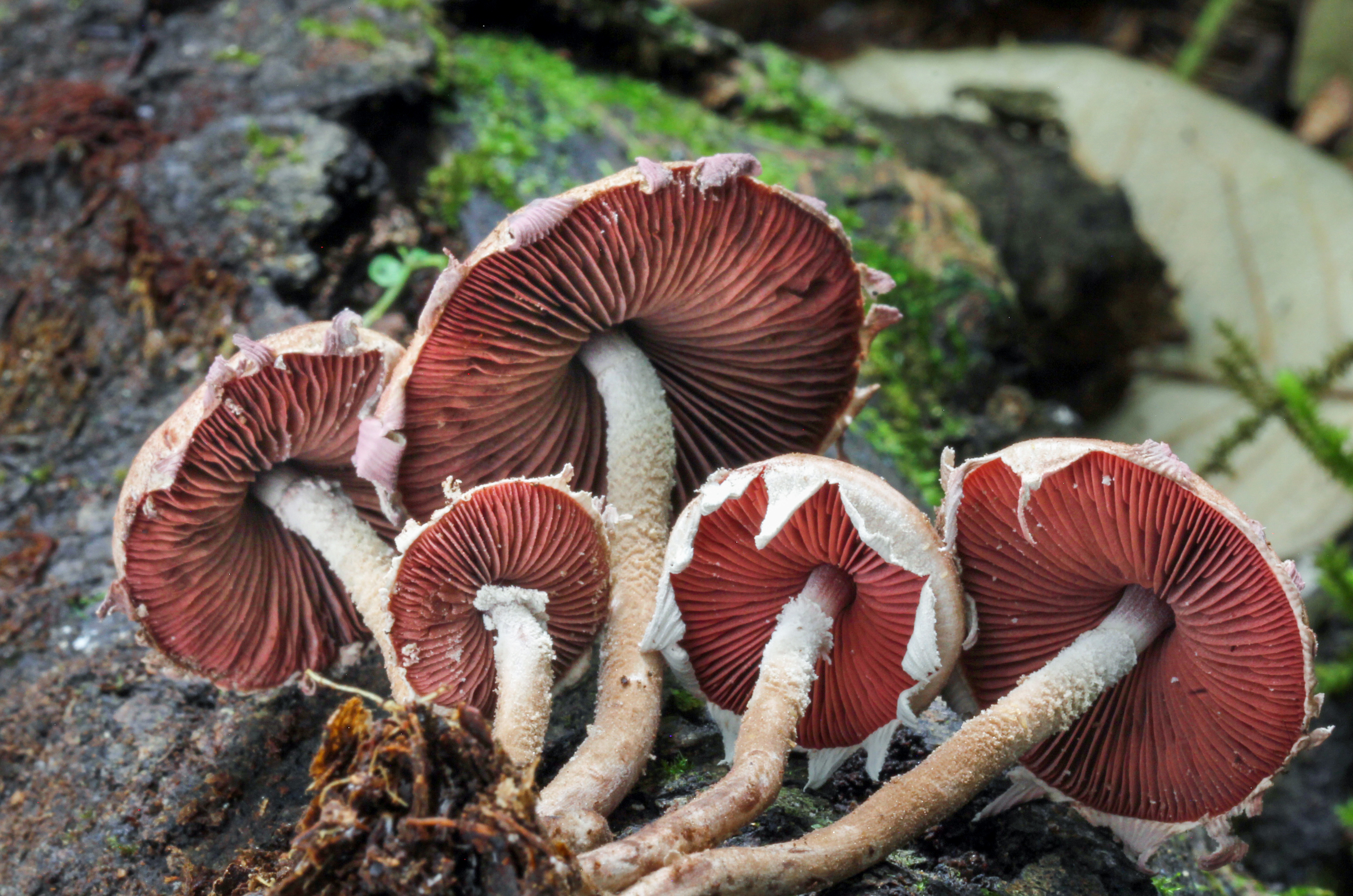
- Melanophyllum haematospermum

Scientific classification
- Domain: Eukaryota
- Kingdom: Fungi
- Division: Basidiomycota
- Class: Agaricomycetes
- Order: Agaricales
- Family: Agaricaceae
- Genus: Melanophyllum; Velen. (1921)

Type species
- Melanophyllum haematospermum (Bull.) Kreisel (1984)

Species
- M. collariatum M. eyrei M. globisporum M. haematospermum

Synonyms
- Chlorosperma Murrill 1922; Chlorospora Massee 1898; Glaucospora Rea 1922

= Melanophyllum =

Genus of fungi

Melanophyllum is a genus of fungi in the family Agaricaceae. The widespread genus contains four species.

== See also ==
- List of Agaricaceae genera
- List of Agaricales genera
