= Atrocybe =

Scientific classification
- Kingdom: Fungi
- Division: Ascomycota
- Class: Leotiomycetes
- Order: Helotiales
- Genus: Atrocybe; Velen. (1947)

Type species
- Atrocybe loricelliformis Velen. (1947)

Genus of fungi

Atrocybe is a fungal genus in the order Helotiales. The relationship of this taxon to other taxa within the order is unknown (incertae sedis), and it has not yet been placed with certainty into any family. This is a monotypic genus, containing the single species Atrocybe loricelliformis.

== See also ==
- List of Helotiales genera incertae sedis
