= Karel Cejp =

Czech botanist and mycologist

Karel Cejp (22 February 1900 – 22 September 1979) was a Czech botanist and mycologist. After finishing highschool (rokycanském gymnáziu), he worked with Bohuslav Horak, an expert in the flora of the Balkan Peninsula and the Mediterranean. Later, he studied at Charles University in Prague with Josef Velenovský. In 1933 he was appointed an associate professorship, and in 1948 became a full professor. Cejp became the editor of the mycological journal Czech Mycology in 1948. Fungal taxa named in his honour include Cejpia, Cejpomyces (now Thanatephorus), and Cejpomycetaceae (since subsumed in Ceratobasidiaceae).
