= Sambucina =

Sambucina may refer to:

- Sambucina (fungus), a genus of fungi in the Helotiales order
- Sambucina (abbey), a Cistercian abbey on the La Sila plateau in Calabria, Italy

== See also ==
- Sambucana
- Sambucus
