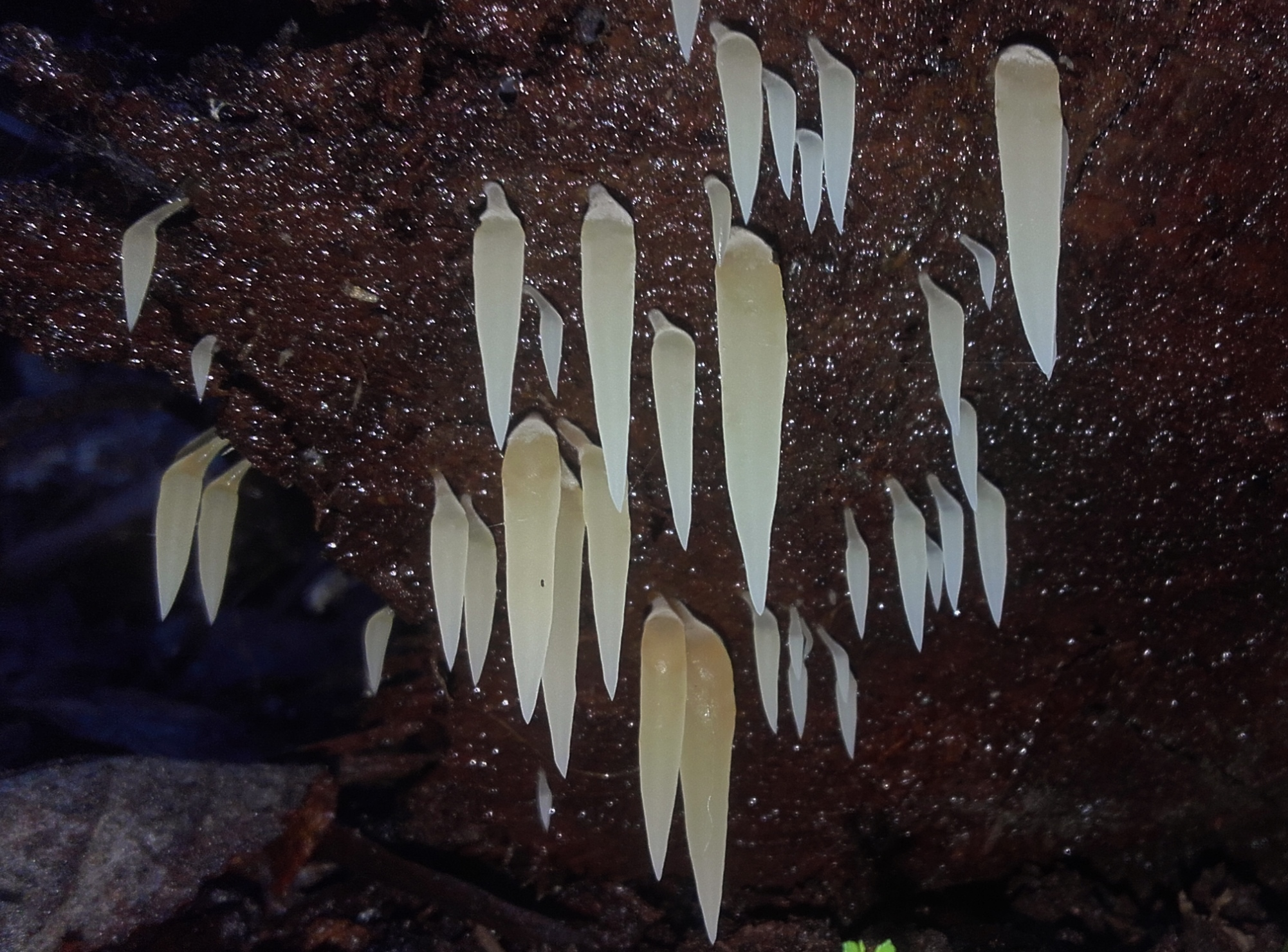
- Mucronella pendula found in Morwell National Park, Victoria, Australia

Scientific classification
- Kingdom: Fungi
- Division: Basidiomycota
- Class: Agaricomycetes
- Order: Agaricales
- Family: Clavariaceae
- Genus: Mucronella
- Species: M. pendula

Binomial name
- Mucronella pendula (Massee) R.H.Petersen (1980)

Synonyms
- Myxomycidium pendulum Massee (1901); Mucronella alba Lloyd (1919)

= Mucronella pendula =

Species of fungus

Mucronella pendula is a species of fungus in the family Clavariaceae. It was first described in 1901 by George Edward Massee as Myxomycidium pendulum and the holotype collection is from Tasmania. American mycologist Ron H. Petersen transferred it to Mucronella in 1980.
