= Loricella =

Loricella is the scientific name of two genera of organisms and may refer to:

- Loricella (chiton), a genus of molluscs in the family Loricidae
- Loricella (fungus), a genus of fungi in the order Helotiales
