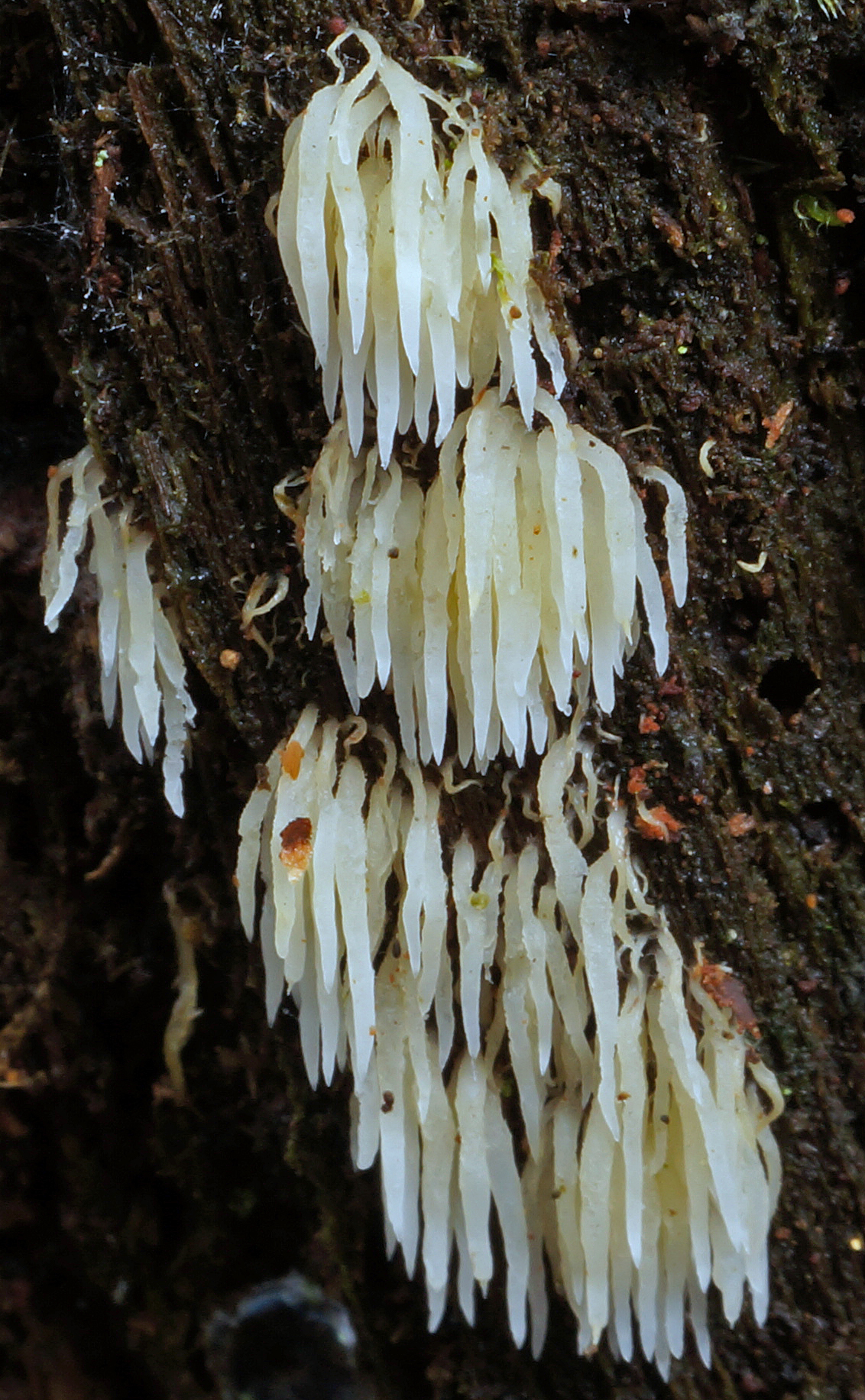
- Mucronella bresadolae

Scientific classification
- Kingdom: Fungi
- Division: Basidiomycota
- Class: Agaricomycetes
- Order: Agaricales
- Family: Clavariaceae
- Genus: Mucronella; Fr. (1874)

Type species
- Mucronella calva (Alb. & Schwein.) Fr. (1874)

Synonyms
- Mucronia Fr. (1849); Myxomycidium Massee (1901)

= Mucronella =

Genus of fungi

Mucronella is a genus of fungi in the family Clavariaceae. Species in the genus resemble awl-shaped teeth that grow in groups without a common subiculum (supporting layer of mycelium).

== Taxonomy ==
The type species was originally named Hydnum calvum in a collaborative effort by the German botanist Johannes Baptista von Albertini and the American Lewis David de Schweinitz in 1805. Swedish mycologist Elias Magnus Fries transferred the species to the newly described genus Mucronella in 1874.

Molecular phylogenetic analysis suggests that the genus is monophyletic, and is sister to the remainder of the Clavariaceae, confirming earlier suspicions that the taxa were phylogenetically related. It had previously been placed in the Russulales due to its amyloid spores, and its morphological similarity to some members of genus Hericium.

== Description ==
Fruitbodies of Mucronella species resemble hanging spines; they occur singly, scattered, or in groups. Colors range from white to yellow to orange. Mucronella has a monomitic hyphal system —consisting of only generative hyphae. The basidia (spore-bearing cells) are four-spored and club shaped. Basidiospores are usually smooth with thin walls, weakly amyloid, and somewhat hyaline (translucent). Mucronella is the sole genus in the Clavariaceae with amyloid spores, and with the "hanging spine" fruitbody morphology.

== Habitat and distribution ==
Mucronella species are saprotrophic. Kartar Singh Thind and I.P.S. Khurana identified five species from the northwestern Himalayas, India, in 1974: M. bresadolae, M. calva, M. flava, M. subalpina, and M. pulchra.

== Species ==
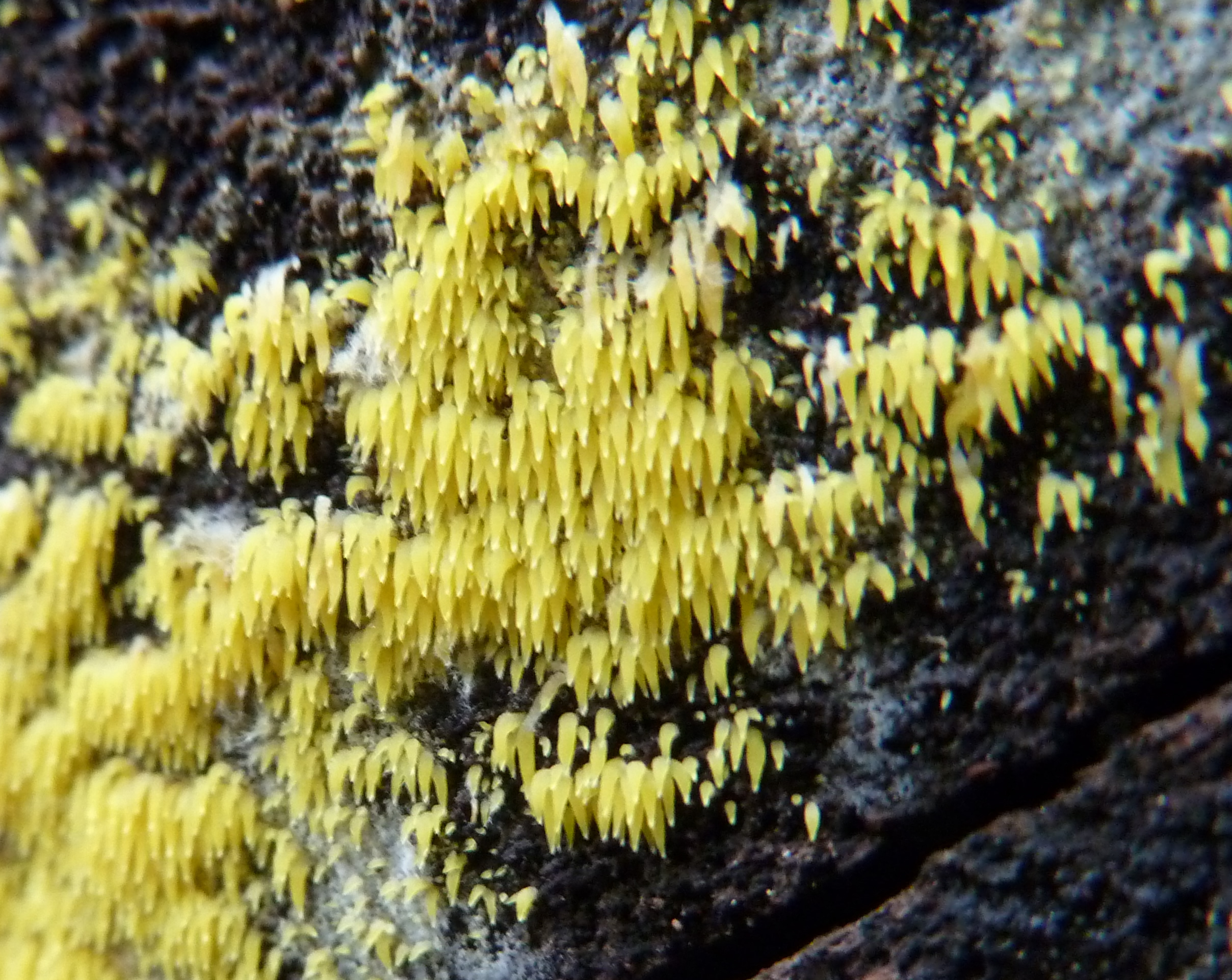
Mucronella flava

As of August 2015, Index Fungorum accepts 17 species of Mucronella:

- Mucronella albidula (Corner) Berthier 1985
- Mucronella argentina Speg. 1898 – South America
- Mucronella belalongensis P.Roberts 1998 – Brunei
- Mucronella brasiliensis Corner 1950 – South America
- Mucronella bresadolae (Quél.) Corner 1970
- Mucronella calva (Alb. & Schwein.) Fr. 1874
- Mucronella flava Corner 1953
- Mucronella fusiformis (Kauffman) K.A.Harrison 1972
- Mucronella minutissima Peck 1891
- Mucronella pendula (Massee) R.H.Petersen 1980 – Australia
- Mucronella polyporacea Velen. 1922 – Europe
- Mucronella pulchra Corner 1970 – Pakistan
- Mucronella pusilla Corner 1950
- Mucronella ramosa Lloyd 1922
- Mucronella styriaca Maas Geest. 1977 – Europe
- Mucronella subalpina K.S.Thind & Khurana 1974 – India
- Mucronella togoensis Henn. 1897 – Africa
