= Dioszegia =

Scientific classification
- Domain: Eukaryota
- Kingdom: Fungi
- Division: Basidiomycota
- Class: Tremellomycetes
- Order: Tremellales
- Family: Bulleribasidiaceae
- Genus: Dioszegia; Zsolt

Type species
- Dioszegia hungarica Zsolt

Genus of fungi

Dioszegia is a genus of fungi in the family Bulleribasidiaceae. The genus, comprising anamorphic forms, has a widespread distribution, and contains around 16 species.
