= Bulleribasidiaceae =

Scientific classification
- Kingdom: Fungi
- Division: Basidiomycota
- Class: Tremellomycetes
- Order: Tremellales
- Family: Bulleribasidiaceae; X.Z. Liu, F.Y. Bai, M. Groenew. & Boekhout (2015)

Genera
- Bulleribasidium; Derxomyces; Dioszegia; Hannaella; Nielozyma; Vishniacozyma

Genus of fungi

The Bulleribasidiaceae is a family of fungi in the order Tremellales.

The family currently contains six genera. Some species produce filamentous sexual states with septate basidia and are parasites of other fungi. Most, however, are only known from their yeast states.
