= Bulleribasidium =

Scientific classification
- Kingdom: Fungi
- Division: Basidiomycota
- Class: Tremellomycetes
- Order: Tremellales
- Family: Bulleribasidiaceae
- Genus: Bulleribasidium; J.P. Samp., M. Weiss & R. Bauer (2002)

Type species
- Bulleribasidium oberjochense J.P. Samp., Gadanho, M. Weiss & R. Bauer (2002)

Genus of fungi

Bulleribasidium is a genus of fungi in the family Bulleribasidiaceae. The genus currently contains some eleven species. The type species is a parasite of other fungi (Cladosporium sp.), its teleomorph having septate basidia and haustorial cells on its hyphae that connect to the host hyphae. Most species are, however, only known from their yeast states.

The genus name of Bulleribasidium is in honour of Arthur Henry Reginald Buller (1874–1944), a British-Canadian mycologist.
