= Cejpia =

Scientific classification
- Kingdom: Fungi
- Division: Ascomycota
- Class: Leotiomycetes
- Order: Helotiales
- Family: Dermateaceae
- Genus: Cejpia; Velen. (1934)

Type species
- Cejpia coerulea Velen. (1934)

Species
- C. amoena C. coerulea C. hystrix

Genus of fungi

Cejpia is a genus of fungi in the family Dermateaceae. The genus, named in honour of Czech mycologist Karel Cejp, contains two species.

The genus was circumscribed by Josef Velenovsky in Monogr. Discom. Bohem. on page 125 in 1934.

== See also ==
- List of Dermateaceae genera
