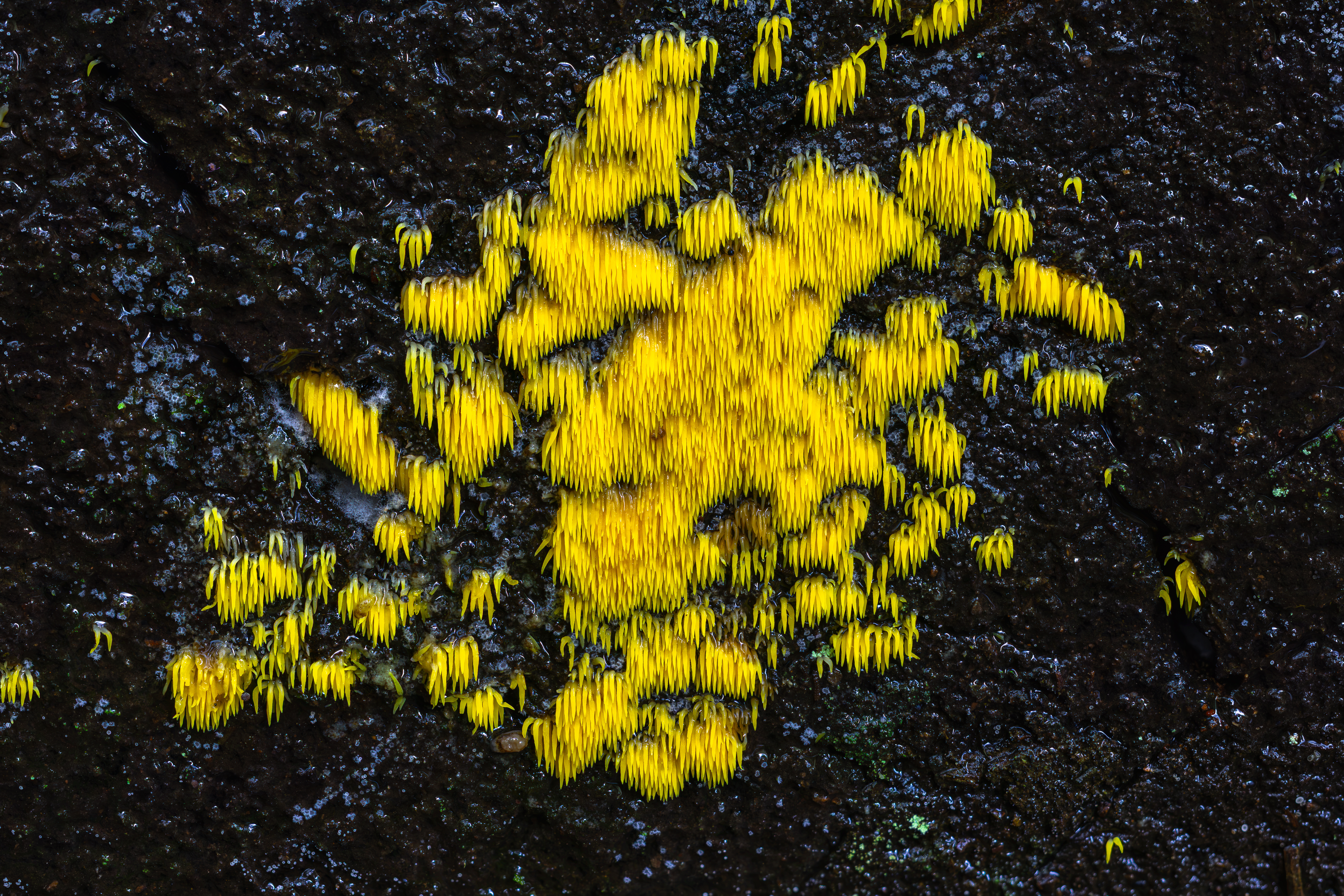

Scientific classification
- Kingdom: Fungi
- Division: Basidiomycota
- Class: Agaricomycetes
- Order: Agaricales
- Family: Clavariaceae
- Genus: Mucronella
- Species: M. flava

Binomial name
- Mucronella flava Corner

= Mucronella flava =

Species of fungus

Mucronella flava is a species of fungus in the family Clavariaceae. It was originally described by English mycologist E. J. H. Corner in 1953.

The teeth are 2–4 millimetres (1/16–3/16 in) long and grow in clumps 1–5 centimetres (1/2–2 in) across; dozens to hundreds of teeth can be found together. It may require microscopy to distinguish from M. pulchra. Phlebia aurea and P. uda are also similar.

It grows on or under conifer logs in North America (on the West Coast and in the northeast).
