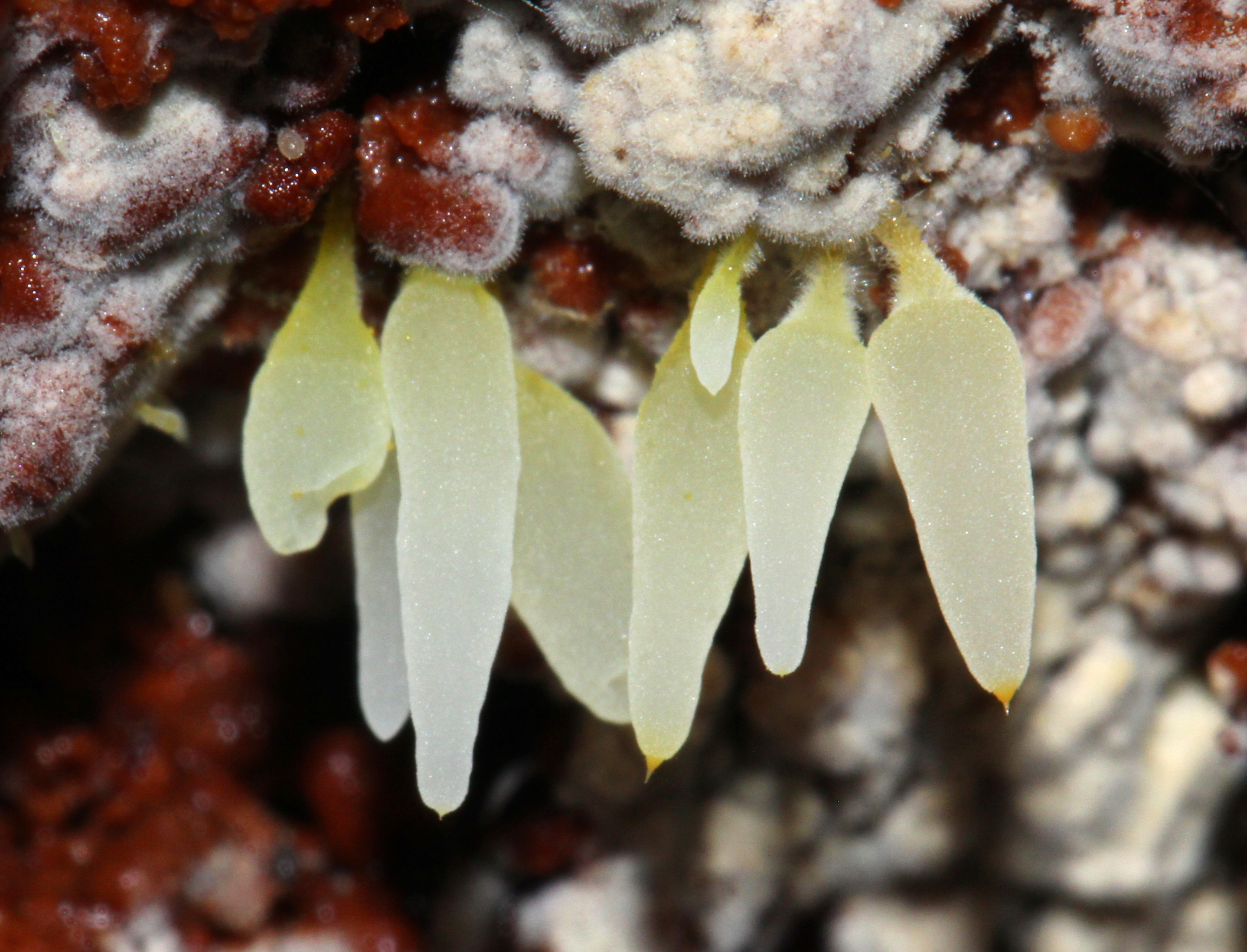

Scientific classification
- Kingdom: Fungi
- Division: Basidiomycota
- Class: Agaricomycetes
- Order: Agaricales
- Family: Clavariaceae
- Genus: Mucronella
- Species: M. fusiformis

Binomial name
- Mucronella fusiformis (Kauffman) K.A. Harrison

Synonyms
- Pistillaria fusiformis Kauffman (1926)

= Mucronella fusiformis =

Species of fungus

Mucronella fusiformis is a species of fungus in the family Clavariaceae. It was first described in 1926 by C. H. Kauffman as Myxomycidium fusiformis and the holotype collection is from Mount Hood in Oregon. Mycologist K.A. Harrison transferred it to Mucronella in 1972.
