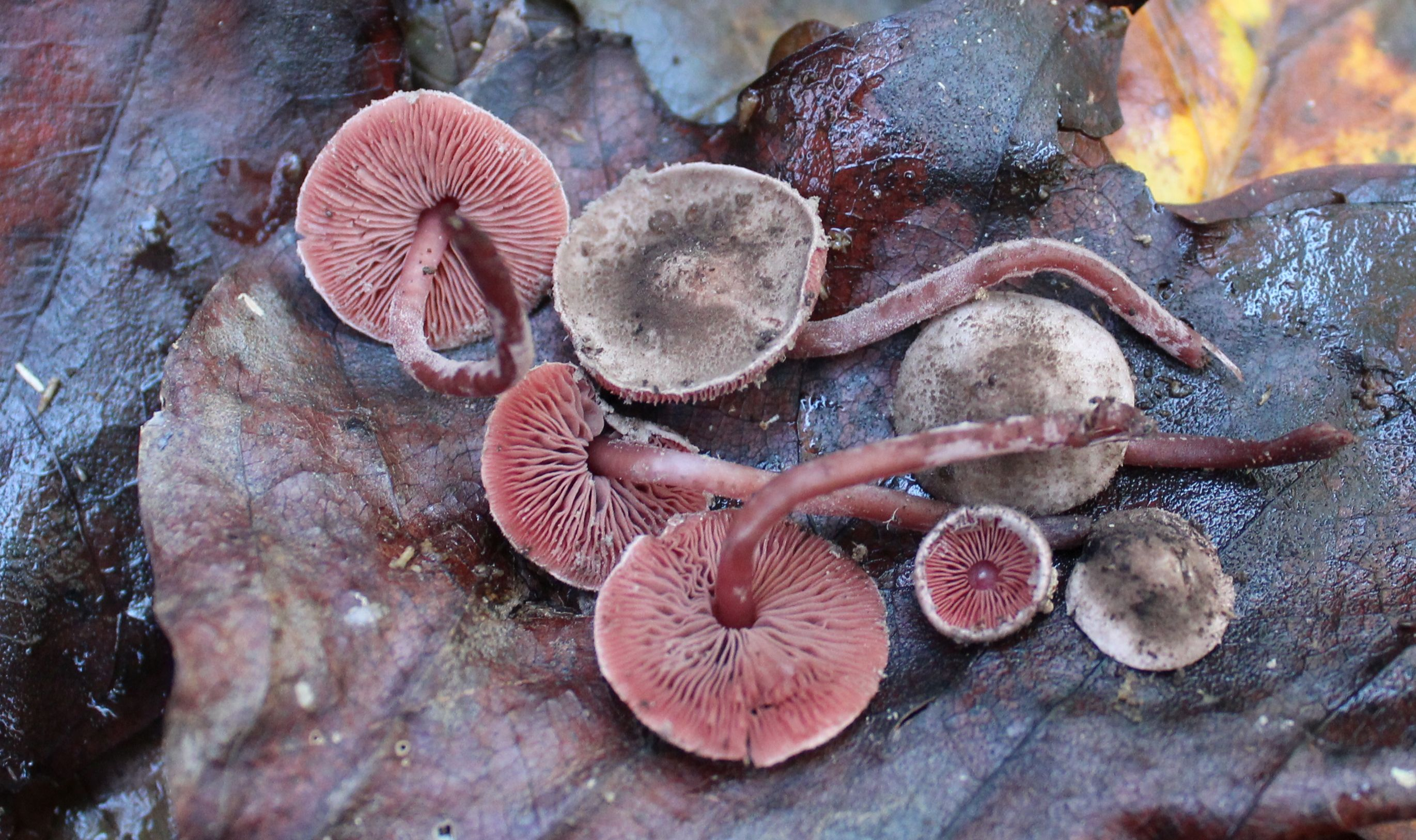

Scientific classification
- Kingdom: Fungi
- Division: Basidiomycota
- Class: Agaricomycetes
- Order: Agaricales
- Family: Agaricaceae
- Genus: Melanophyllum
- Species: M. haematospermum

Binomial name
- Melanophyllum haematospermum (Bull.) Kriesel

Synonyms
- Agaricus haematospermus Bull.

= Melanophyllum haematospermum =

Melanophyllum haematospermum
- Mycological characteristics
- Gills on hymenium
- Cap is convex or umbonate
- Hymenium is free
- Stipe has a ring or is bare
- Spore print is olive
- Edibility is unknown

Melanophyllum haematospermum, commonly known as the red-spored dapperling, is a species of mushroom in the genus Melanophyllum.

== Taxonomy ==
Melanophyllum haematospermum was first described in 1793 as Agaricus haematospermus. However, in 1984, it was transferred to the genus Melanophyllum.

== Description ==
The cap of Melanophyllum haematospermum is 1–3 centimeters in diameter, and starts out obtusely conical before becoming convex. It is sometimes umbonate. It can be beige, grayish-brown, or tan. The stipe is 2–5.5 centimeters long and 0.2–0.4 centimeters wide. The gills are red, but despite its common name, the spore print is olive-green, and reportedly bluish green when the mushroom is fresher.

== Habitat and ecology ==
Melanophyllum haematospermum can be found under trees, and it grows in soil rich in humus, often in disturbed areas. It has been found near roads, in gardens, and even in compost piles and greenhouses. It is rare in the Pacific Northwest, and fruits during late summer and autumn.
