= Tobías Lasser =

Venezuelan botanist (1911–2006)

Tobías Lasser CBE
- Born: 24 May 1911; Agua Larga, Falcón State, Venezuela
- Died: 25 May 2006 (aged 95); Caracas, Venezuela

Tobías Lasser CBE (24 May 1911 – 25 May 2006) was a recognized Venezuelan botanist, being a fundamental pillar in the creation of the Botanical Garden of Caracas, the School of Biology and the Faculty of Sciences of the Central University of Venezuela. He was born in Agua Larga, Falcón State, Venezuela.

He was honoured in 1960, when botanist Richard William George Dennis published Lasseria, which is a genus of fungi in the Helotiales order.

== Publications ==
- LASSER, TOBÍAS. 1945: “Exploraciones botánicas en el Estado Mérida”. Impresores Unidos. Caracas – Venezuela.
- LASSER, TOBÍAS. 1954: “Apuntes sobre la vida y obra de Henri Pittier”. Boletín de la Sociedad Venezolana de Ciencias Naturales. 13(76):1–5.
- LASSER, TOBÍAS. 1954: “Clave analítica de las familias de las traqueófitas de Venezuela”. Tipografia Americana. Caracas – Venezuela (también publicado en Boletín de la Academia de Ciencias Física Matemáticas y Naturales Nº 48. Caracas – Venezuela).
- LASSER, TOBÍAS. 1955: “Nuestro destino frente a nuestra naturaleza”. Biblioteca de cultural rural. Colección Recursos Naturales Renovables. Ministerio de Agricultura y Cría. Caracas – Venezuela.
- LASSER, TOBÍAS. 1967: “Información personal acerca del A. dubius a la Sra. Irma De Sola Ricardo”. En: Contribución al estudio de los planos de Caracas. Caracas – Venezuela.
- LASSER, TOBÍAS. 1970: “Materia prima”. Graficas Continente. Caracas – Venezuela.
- LASSER, TOBÍAS. 1971: “Los viajeros científicos en Venezuela”. Boletín de la Asociación Cultural Humboldt. Nº 6. Caracas – Venezuela.
- LASSER, TOBÍAS. 1971: “La revolución biológica”. Acta Botanica Venezuelica. 13(1–4)9–22.
- LASSER, TOBÍAS. BRAUN, AUGUST. Y STEYERMARK, JULIAN A. 1974: “Catálogo de las plantas que cercenan el Jardín Botánico”. Ministerio de Agricultura y Cría.
- LASSER, TOBÍAS. Y VARESCHI, VOLKMAR. 1957. “La vegetación de los Medanos de Coro”. Boletín de la Sociedad Venezolana de Ciencias Naturales. Caracas – Venezuela.
- LASSER, TOBÍAS. Y VARESCHI, VOLKMAR. 1959. “La vegetación del lago de asfalto de Guanaco”. Acta Biologica Venezuelica. Caracas – Venezuela.
- PITTIER, HENRI FRANÇOIS, BADILLO FRANCERI, VICTOR M., LASSER, TOBÍAS., SCHNEE, L. Y LUCES FEBRES, ZORAIDA. 1945–1947: “Catálogo de la flora Venezolana”. Litografía y Tipografía Vargas. Caracas – Venezuela.
- STEYERMARK, JULIAN A. Y LASSER, TOBÍAS. 1981: “A new species of Eugenia (Myrtaceae) from Venezuela”. Brittonia. 33(1):25–27.

== See also ==
- Botany
- Venezuela
- Central University of Venezuela

== Other sources ==
- UCV Sin Fronteras, a magazine of the Central University of Venezuela
- FACULTAD DE CIENCIAS – UCV. 2002: "Plaza del profesor, conifera y afines". Noticiencia. 23(293):9.
- MANARA, BRUNO. 2003: “La corifas y August Brau” Acta Botanica Venezuelica. 26(1):97–102. ISSN 0084-5906
- PERDOMO MARÍN OSCAR y VALLENILA, LUIS. 2003: "Entrevista. Científico, profesor y poeta, Tobías Lasser. Le tengo miedo a la política". Ultimas Noticias.Domingo 30 de septiembre de 2003. Caracas – Venezuela pp:36–37.
- RODRÍGUEZ LEYDA Y HOKCHE, OMAIRA. 2006: “Herbario Nacional de Venezuela (Ven): 85 años de historia y representación de la flora venezolana”. Acta Botanica Venezuelica. 29(2):363–367. ISSN 0084-5906
- TEXERA, YOLANDA. 1992: “La Facultad de Ciencias de la Universidad Central de Venezuela”. En: Ruiz Calderón, Humberto et al. “La ciencia en Venezuela pasado, presente y futuro”. Cuadernos Lagoven. Lagoven, S.A. Caracas Venezuela pp:50–63.
- UCV Sin Fronteras, revista de la Universidad Central de Venezuela. ISBN 980-259-470-9
