= Ivy Massee =

British mycologist

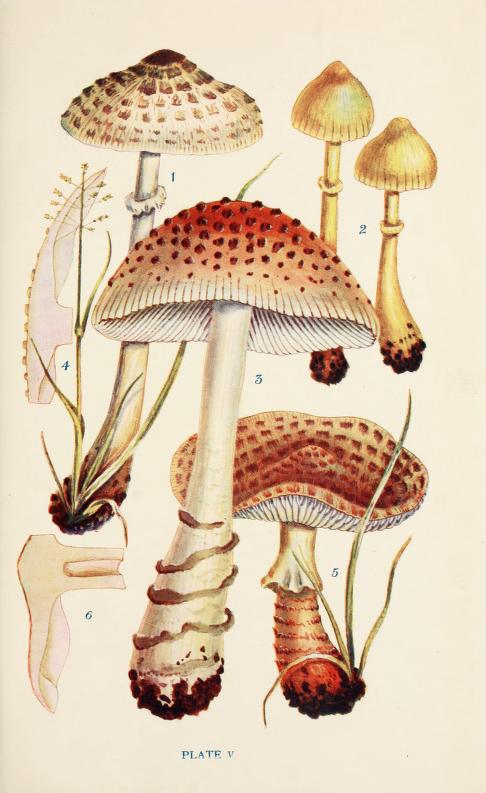
Plate V of forty illustrations produced for the book British Fungi: with a chapter on lichens by George Massee (1911)

Ivy Massee (9 October 1895 – 11 July 1951) was an English mycologist, scientific illustrator and botanist.

== Biography ==
Born to George Massee and Emily Jane Aldridge in 1895, she was one of six siblings. Her father was a mycologist and was the first president of the British Mycological Society. Massee's most notable contribution to mycology is the illustrations she produced for her father's book British Fungi: with a chapter on lichens. Massee completed forty illustrations for the book on coloured plates.

Massee was also an active collector in the mycological field. During the annual meeting of the Mycological Committee held at North Yorkshire in 1913, she presented a paper on the Genus Mycena along with an array of micro structure illustrations. In this meeting she was proposed to join the committee.

Massee is also recognised as a botanist, as she collected and painted plants. As part of her botany research, she produced a series of poplar illustrations for Augustine Henry which are now at Glasnevin.
