= Orazio Comes =

Italian botanist (1848–1917)

Orazio Comes (11 November 1848 – 13 October 1917) was an Italian botanist.

From 1906 to 1917 he directed the Agricultural Higher Institute of Portici, in which, thanks to Vincenzo de Cesati, he began teaching since 1877 as assistant of Nicola Pedicino for the chair of botany, to whom he succeeded in 1880.

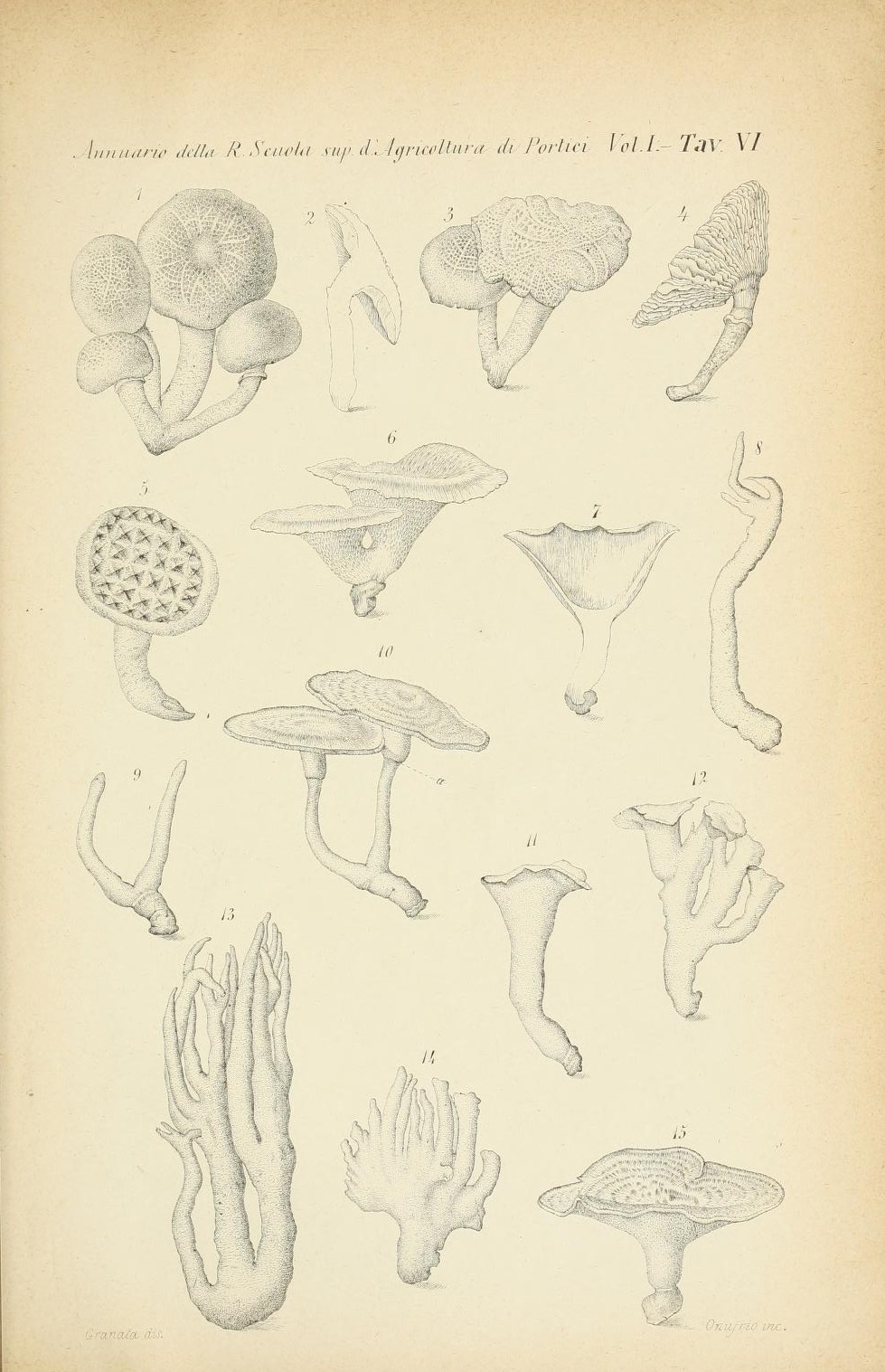
Comes Funghi del napolitano 1878 tav 6

In his works he studied the physiology and plant pathology of Neapolitan mushrooms and agricultural plants, such as beans and tobacco. From 1881, Comes began to deal with the cultivation of tobacco to improve industrial production and, starting from 1891, he emphasized the study and experimentation in that sector.

In 1958 the museum of the botanical institute of Portici, hosted in the Royal Palace, was named after him.

He is honoured in the name of Comesia, a genus of fungi in the Helotiales order, circumscribed in 1884.

The standard author abbreviation Comes is used to indicate this person as the author when citing a botanical name.
