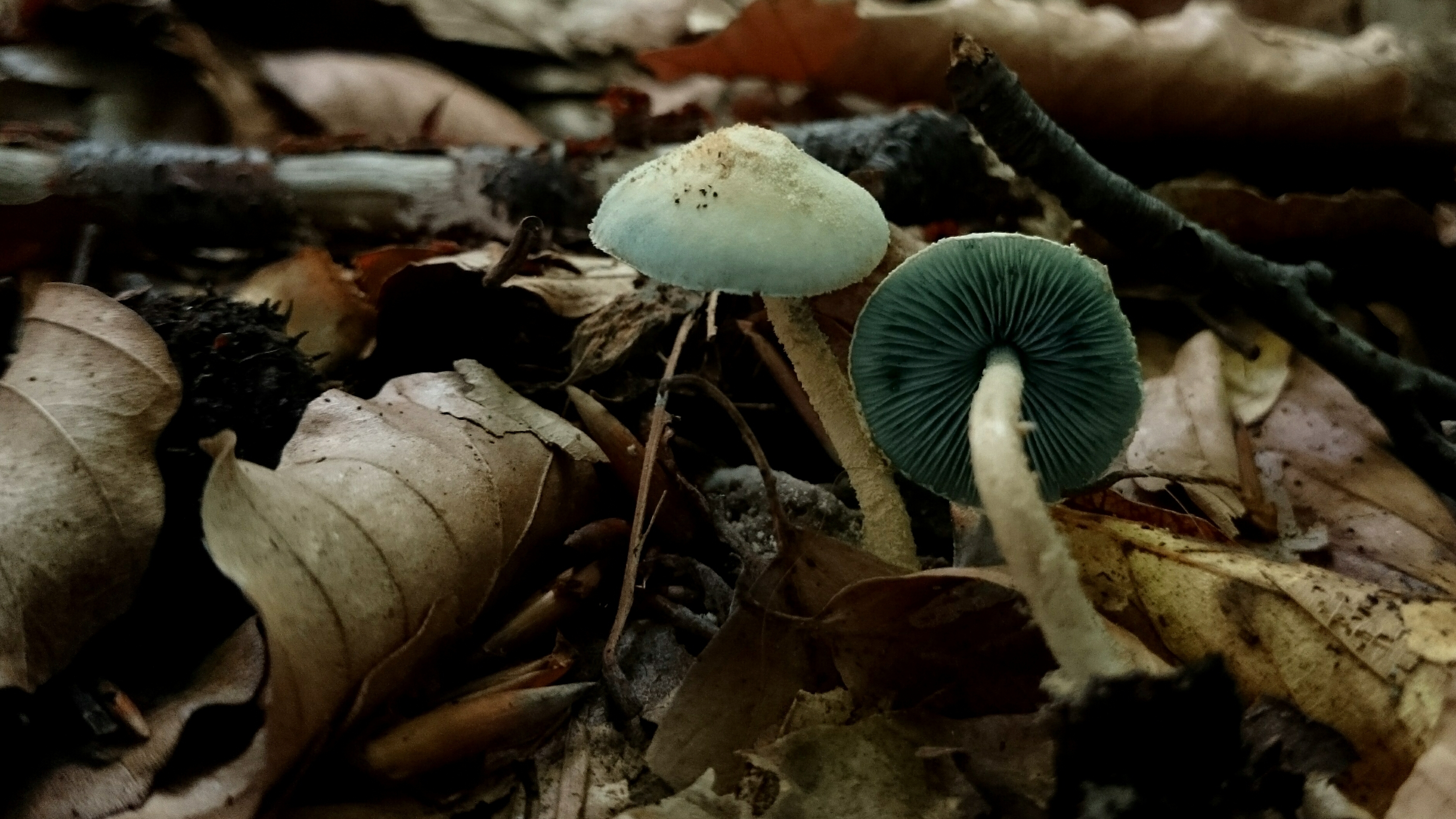

Scientific classification
- Kingdom: Fungi
- Division: Basidiomycota
- Class: Agaricomycetes
- Order: Agaricales
- Family: Agaricaceae
- Genus: Melanophyllum
- Species: M. eyrei

Binomial name
- Melanophyllum eyrei (Massee) Singer

Synonyms
- Chlorospora eyrei Cystoderma eyrei Glaucospora eyrei Lepiota eyrei Schulzeria eyrei

= Melanophyllum eyrei =

Species of fungus

Melanophyllum eyrei
- Mycological characteristics
- Gills on hymenium
- Cap is convex
- Hymenium is free
- Stipe is bare
- Spore print is green
- Ecology is saprotrophic
- Edibility is unknown

Melanophyllum eyrei, commonly known as the greenspored dapperling is an uncommon species of fungus belonging to the family Agaricaceae.

It is native to Europe and Britain in deciduous woodland with scrub on calcareous soil.

The cap can be up to 3 cm (1.2 in) in diameter, hemispherical, becoming flat with an appendiculate margin. Dingy white, sometimes with a brownish centre; surface granular or powdery.

The gills are bluish green with a pale green spore print; free. The stipe is up to 3 cm (1.2 in) long, slender and similar in colour and texture to the cap. No ring.
