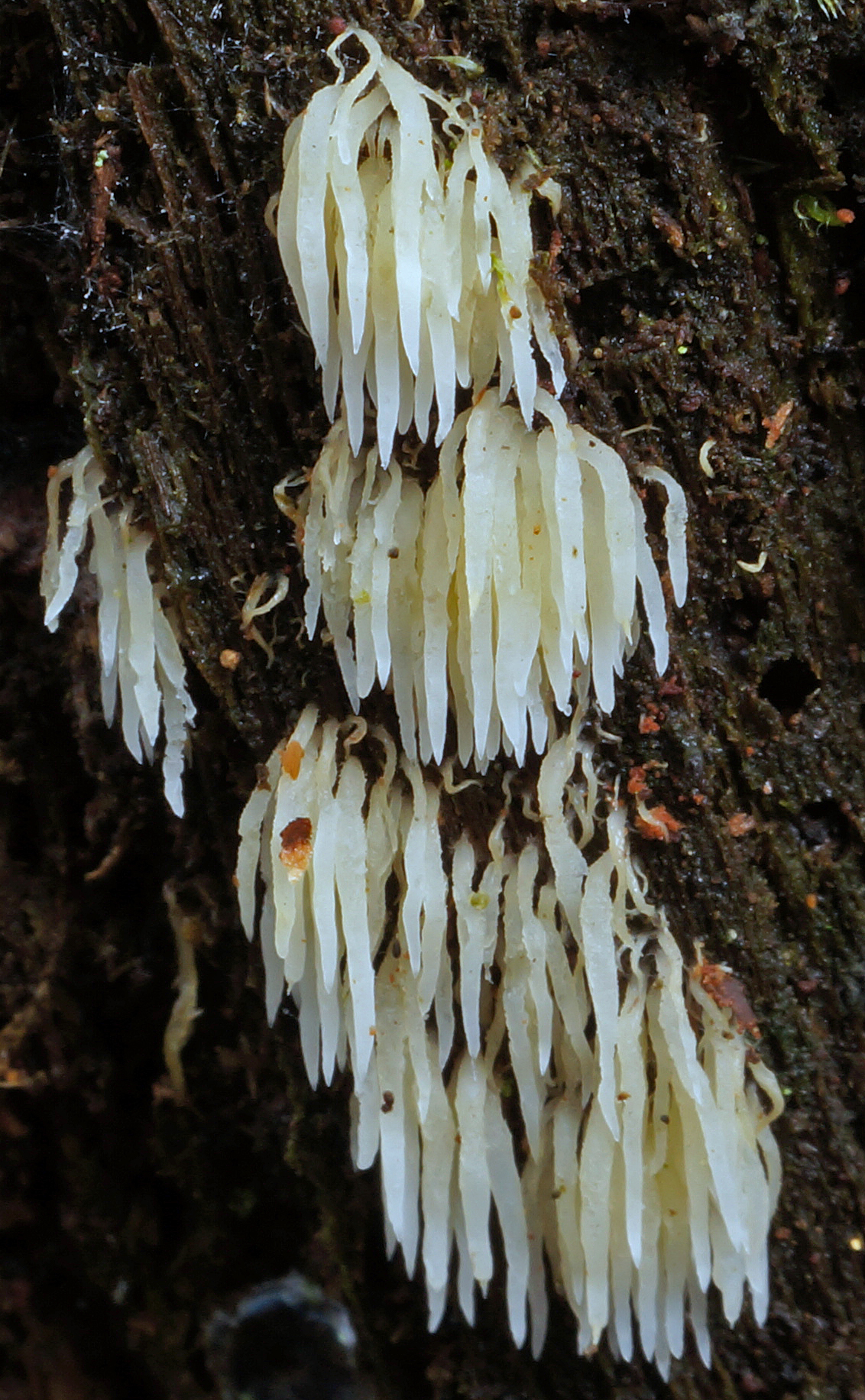

Scientific classification
- Kingdom: Fungi
- Division: Basidiomycota
- Class: Agaricomycetes
- Order: Agaricales
- Family: Clavariaceae
- Genus: Mucronella
- Species: M. bresadolae

Binomial name
- Mucronella bresadolae (Quél.) Corner (1970)

Synonyms
- Clavaria bresadolae Quél. (1888); Hericium bresadolae (Quél.) Malençon (1958); Mucronella bresadolae var. microspora Krieglst. (1985)

= Mucronella bresadolae =

Species of fungus

Mucronella bresadolae is a species of fungus in the family Clavariaceae. It was originally described by French mycologist Lucien Quélet in 1888 as Clavaria bresadolae. E.J.H. Corner transferred it to the genus Mucronella in 1970. It is found in Europe and North America.

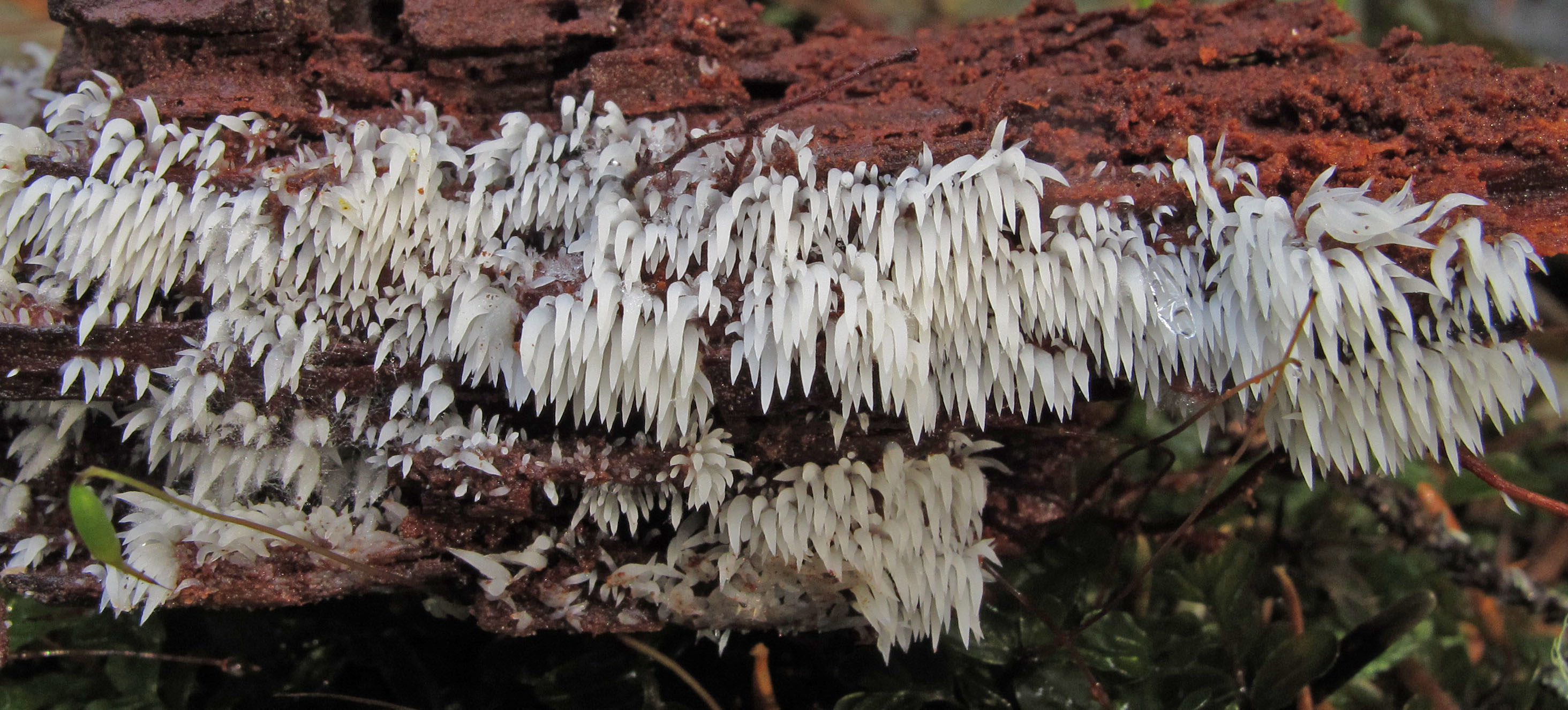
A large cluster of the fungus growing on a rotten conifer stump in Clatsop County, Oregon.
