= Vishniacozyma =

Scientific classification
- Kingdom: Fungi
- Division: Basidiomycota
- Class: Tremellomycetes
- Order: Tremellales
- Family: Bulleribasidiaceae
- Genus: Vishniacozyma; Xin Zhan Liu, F.Y.Bai, M.Groenew. & Boekhou

Genus of fungi

Vishniacozyma is a ubiquitous genus of yeast fungi belonging to the family Bulleribasidiaceae. This genus is globally distributed being found on plants, litter, soil and other natural substrates.

== Species ==
This genus contains numerous species which are both epiphytic and endophytic. In China, they are highly diverse with around 20 species that have been discovered. In Russia, there are only about six species discovered with two proposed.

An incomplete list of them can be seen below:

- Vishniacozyma alagoana
- Vishniacozyma carnescens
- Vishniacozyma catalpae
- Vishniacozyma changhuana
- Vishniacozyma dimennae
- Vishniacozyma diospyri
- Vishniacozyma ellesmerensis
- Vishniacozyma eriobotryae
- Vishniacozyma europaea
- Vishniacozyma fructicola
- Vishniacozyma globispora
- Vishniacozyma guiyangensis
- Vishniacozyma heimaeyensis
- Vishniacozyma indica
- Vishniacozyma insularis
- Vishniacozyma kombuchae
- Vishniacozyma kurtzmanii
- Vishniacozyma marinae
- Vishniacozyma melezitolytica
- Vishniacozyma nebularis
- Vishniacozyma paravictoriae
- Vishniacozyma peneaus
- Vishniacozyma pingtangensis
- Vishniacozyma phoenicis
- Vishniacozyma pini
- Vishniacozyma pseudocarnescens
- Vishniacozyma pseudodimennae
- Vishniacozyma pseudofoliicola
- Vishniacozyma pseudopenaeus
- Vishniacozyma psychrotolerans
- Vishniacozyma pyri
- Vishniacozyma sinopodophylli
- Vishniacozyma taibaiensis
- Vishniacozyma taiwanica
- Vishniacozyma tephrensis
- Vishniacozyma terrae
- Vishniacozyma tianchiensis
- Vishniacozyma victoriae
- Vishniacozyma zhenxiongensis
