= Masseea =

Scientific classification
- Kingdom: Fungi
- Division: Ascomycota
- Class: Leotiomycetes
- Order: Helotiales
- Family: incertae sedis
- Genus: Masseea; Sacc.

Type species
- Masseea quisquiliarum (Berk. & M.A. Curtis) Sacc.

Genus of fungi

Masseea is a genus of fungi in the Helotiales order. The relationship of this taxon to other taxa within the order is unknown (incertae sedis), and it has not yet been placed with certainty into any family.

The genus name of Masseea is in honour of George Edward Massee (1845–1917), who was an English mycologist, plant pathologist, and botanist.

The genus was circumscribed by Pier Andrea Saccardo in Syll. Fung. vol.8 on page 488 in 1899.
