= Merodontis =

Scientific classification
- Kingdom: Fungi
- Division: Ascomycota
- Class: Leotiomycetes
- Order: Helotiales
- Family: incertae sedis
- Genus: Merodontis; Clem. (1909)

Type species
- Merodontis tenella (Penz. & Sacc.) Clem. (1909)

Synonyms
- Davincia subgen. Davinciella Sacc. & D.Sacc. (1906)

Genus of fungi

Merodontis is a fungal genus in the order Helotiales. The relationship of this taxon to other taxa within the order is unknown (incertae sedis), and it has not yet been placed with certainty into any family. This is a monotypic genus, containing the single species Merodontis tenella. Merodontis was circumscribed by American ecologist Frederic Clements in 1909.
