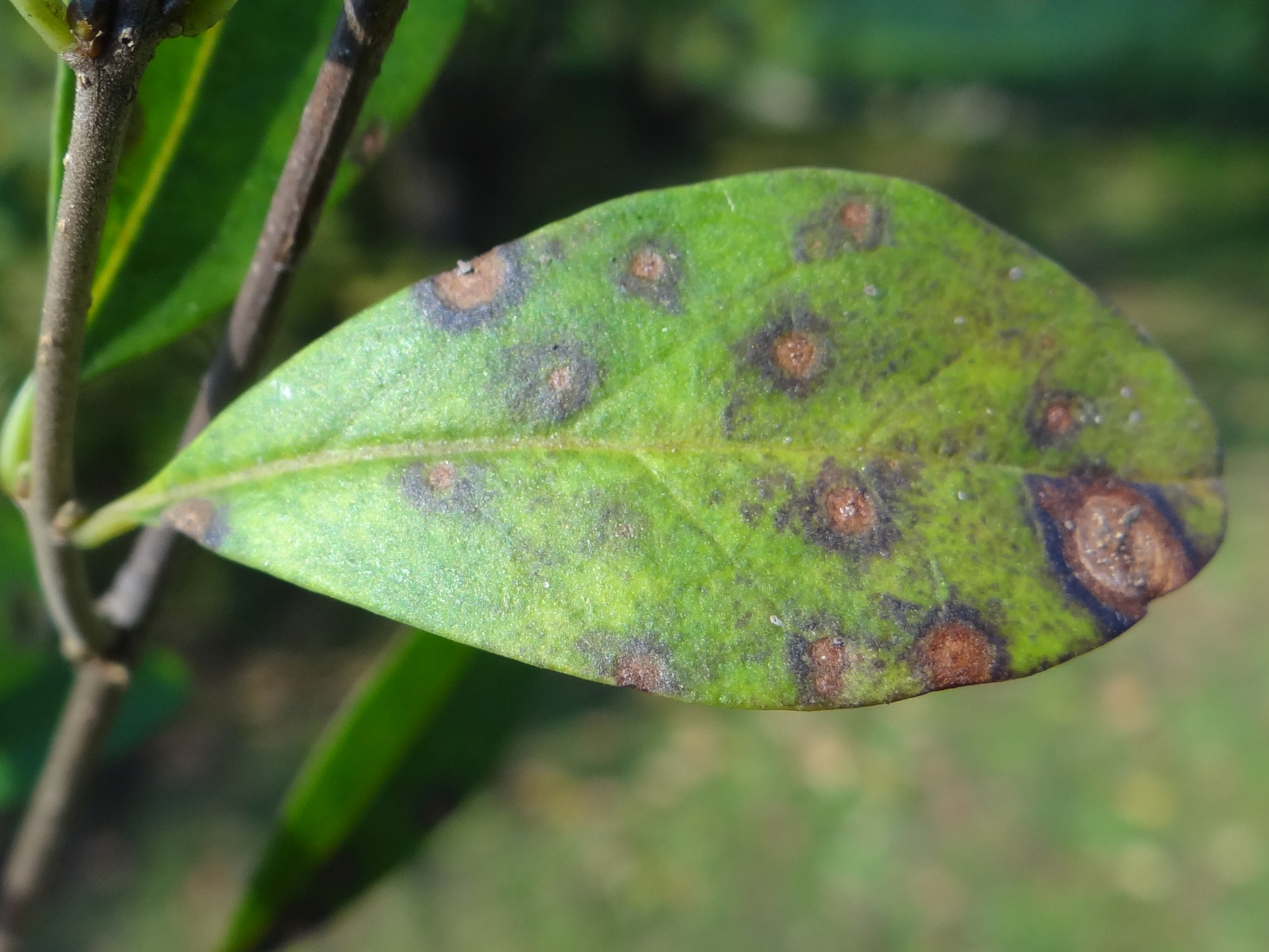
- Thedgonia ligustrina on leaf of Ligustrum vulgare

Scientific classification
- Kingdom: Fungi
- Division: Ascomycota
- Class: Leotiomycetes
- Order: Helotiales
- Family: Drepanopezizaceae
- Genus: Thedgonia; B.Sutton

= Thedgonia =

Genus of fungi

Thedgonia is a genus of fungi in the family Drepanopezizaceae of the order Helotiales. They have been recorded in most places in Europe including Great Britain.

They affect plants such as Ligustrum vulgare and species of Verbascum, forming spots on the leaves.

== Species ==
As accepted by Species Fungorum;

- Thedgonia bellocensis (C. Massal. & Sacc.) U. Braun (1992)
- Thedgonia dioscoreae (Deighton) U. Braun (1990)
- Thedgonia ligustrina (Boerema) B. Sutton (1973)
- Thedgonia lupini (Davis) U. Braun (1994)
- Thedgonia pavoniae (Deighton) U. Braun (1990)
- Thedgonia pulvinata R.F. Castañeda (1988)
