= Zugazaea =

Scientific classification
- Kingdom: Fungi
- Division: Ascomycota
- Class: Leotiomycetes
- Order: Helotiales
- Family: incertae sedis
- Genus: Zugazaea; Korf, Iturr. & Lizoň (1998)

Type species
- Zugazaea agyrioides Korf, Iturr. & Lizoň (1998)

Genus of fungi

Zugazaea is a fungal genus in the order Helotiales. The relationship of this taxon to other taxa within the order is unknown (incertae sedis), and it has not yet been placed with certainty into any family. This is a monotypic genus, containing the single species Zugazaea agyrioides, which was found growing on decomposing wood in the Canary Islands. The fungus produces small, dull orange fruitbodies that seem to be embedded in a resinous or mulicaginous material. The type species is named for its resemblance to some members of the genus Agyrium.

The genus was circumscribed by Richard Paul Korf, María Teresita 'Teresa' Iturriaga de Capiello and Pavel Lizoň in Mycologia vol.90 (4) on page 698 in 1998.

The genus name of Zugazaea is in honour of Álvaro Zugaza (1911–2002), who was a Spanish Pharmacist and Mycologist. He worked in Bilbao and obtained his doctorate researching Ergot fungus (Claviceps).
