= Pseudopeltis =

Scientific classification
- Kingdom: Fungi
- Division: Ascomycota
- Class: Leotiomycetes
- Order: Helotiales
- Family: incertae sedis
- Genus: Pseudopeltis; L.Holm & K.Holm (1978)

Type species
- Pseudopeltis filicum L.Holm & K.Holm (1978)

Species
- P. filicum P. perminuta

Genus of fungi

Pseudopeltis is a genus of fungi in the order Helotiales. The relationship of this taxon to other taxa within the order is unknown (incertae sedis), and it has not yet been placed with certainty into any family.
