= Lasseria =

Scientific classification
- Kingdom: Fungi
- Division: Ascomycota
- Class: Leotiomycetes
- Order: Helotiales
- Family: incertae sedis
- Genus: Lasseria; Dennis

Type species
- Lasseria chrysophthalma Dennis

Genus of fungi

Lasseria is a genus of fungi in the Helotiales order. The relationship of this taxon to other taxa within the order is unknown (incertae sedis), and it has not yet been placed with certainty into any family.

The genus name of Lasseria is in honour of Tobías Lasser (1911–2006), who was a Venezuelan botanist.

The genus was circumscribed by Richard William George Dennis in Kew Bull. vol.14 on page 422 in 1960.

It is a monotypic genus, containing the single species Lasseria chrysophthalma.
