= Chondroderris =

Scientific classification
- Kingdom: Fungi
- Division: Ascomycota
- Class: Leotiomycetes
- Order: Helotiales
- Genus: Chondroderris; Maire

Type species
- Chondroderris nevadensis Maire

Genus of fungi

Chondroderris is a genus of fungi in the Helotiales order. The relationship of this taxon to other taxa within the order is unknown (incertae sedis), and it has not yet been placed with certainty into any family. This is a monotypic genus, containing the single species Chondroderris nevadensis.
