= Riedera =

Scientific classification
- Kingdom: Fungi
- Division: Ascomycota
- Class: Leotiomycetes
- Order: Helotiales
- Family: incertae sedis
- Genus: Riedera; Fr.

Type species
- Riedera elaeochrysa

Genus of fungi

Riedera is a genus of fungi in the Helotiales order. The relationship of this taxon to other taxa within the order is unknown (incertae sedis), and it has not yet been placed with certainty into any family.

The genus name of Riedera is in honour of Johann Georg von Rieder (fl. 1825–36), who was a botanist (Mycology), he was also Manager of the (Kaiserlichen) Imperial Botanical Garden in Kamtschatka and plant collector.

The genus was circumscribed by Elias Magnus Fries in Summa Veg. Scand. on page 358 in 1849.

It currently has one known species, Riedera elaeochrysa Fr. (1849). A former species Riedera melaxantha Fr. & H. Hoffm. (1863) is now a synonym of Desmazierella melaxantha (with the Chorioactidaceae family).
