= Pseudotryblidium =

Scientific classification
- Kingdom: Fungi
- Division: Ascomycota
- Class: Leotiomycetes
- Order: Helotiales
- Family: incertae sedis
- Genus: Pseudotryblidium; Rehm

Type species
- Pseudotryblidium neesii (Flot.) Rehm

Genus of fungi

Pseudotryblidium is a genus of fungi in the Helotiales order. The relationship of this taxon to other taxa within the order is unknown (incertae sedis), and it has not yet been placed with certainty into any family. This is a monotypic genus, containing the single species Pseudotryblidium neesii.
