= Mycosphaerangium =

Scientific classification
- Kingdom: Fungi
- Division: Ascomycota
- Class: Leotiomycetes
- Order: Helotiales
- Family: incertae sedis
- Genus: Mycosphaerangium; Verkley

Type species
- Mycosphaerangium tetrasporum (Ellis) Verkley

Genus of fungi

Mycosphaerangium is a genus of fungi in the Helotiales order. The relationship of this taxon to other taxa within the order is unknown (incertae sedis), and it has not yet been placed with certainty into any family.
