= Comesia =

Scientific classification
- Kingdom: Fungi
- Division: Ascomycota
- Class: Leotiomycetes
- Order: Helotiales
- Genus: Comesia; Sacc.

Type species
- Comesia felicitatis (P. Crouan & H. Crouan) Sacc.

Genus of fungi

Comesia is a genus of fungi in the Helotiales order. The relationship of this taxon to other taxa within the order is unknown (incertae sedis), and it has not yet been placed with certainty into any family.

The genus name of Comesia is in honour of Orazio Comes (1848 – 1917), who was an Italian botanist.

The genus was circumscribed by Pier Andrea Saccardo in Bot. Centralbl. Vol.18 on pages 218, 342 and 372 in 1884.
