= Pteromyces =

Scientific classification
- Kingdom: Fungi
- Division: Ascomycota
- Class: Leotiomycetes
- Order: Helotiales
- Family: incertae sedis
- Genus: Pteromyces; E. Bommer, M. Rousseau & Sacc.

Type species
- Pteromyces ambiguus E. Bommer, M. Rousseau & Sacc. ex Sacc.

Genus of fungi

Pteromyces is a genus of fungi in the Helotiales order. The relationship of this taxon to other taxa within the order is unknown (incertae sedis), and it has not yet been placed with certainty into any family. This is a monotypic genus, containing the single species Pteromyces ambiguus.
