= Phaeopyxis =

Scientific classification
- Kingdom: Fungi
- Division: Ascomycota
- Class: Leotiomycetes
- Order: Helotiales
- Family: incertae sedis
- Genus: Phaeopyxis; Rambold & Triebel

Type species
- Phaeopyxis punctum (A. Massal.) Rambold, Triebel & Coppins

Genus of fungi

Phaeopyxis is a genus of fungi in the Helotiales order. The relationship of this taxon to other taxa within the order is unknown (incertae sedis), and it has not yet been placed with certainty into any family.
