= Gloeotinia =

Scientific classification
- Kingdom: Fungi
- Division: Ascomycota
- Class: Leotiomycetes
- Order: Helotiales
- Family: incertae sedis
- Genus: Gloeotinia; M. Wilson, Noble & E.G. Gray

Type species
- Gloeotinia temulenta (Prill. & Delacr.) M. Wilson, Noble & E.G. Gray

Genus of fungi

Gloeotinia is a genus of fungi in the Helotiales order. The relationship of this taxon to other taxa within the order is unknown (incertae sedis), and it has not yet been placed with certainty into any family.
