= Orbiliopsis =

Scientific classification
- Kingdom: Fungi
- Division: Ascomycota
- Class: Leotiomycetes
- Order: Helotiales
- Family: incertae sedis
- Genus: Orbiliopsis (Sacc.) Syd. & P. Syd.

Type species
- Orbiliopsis austriaca (Höhn.) Höhn.

Genus of fungi

Orbiliopsis is a genus of fungi in the Helotiales order. The relationship of this taxon to other taxa within the order is unknown (incertae sedis), and it has not yet been placed with certainty into any family.
