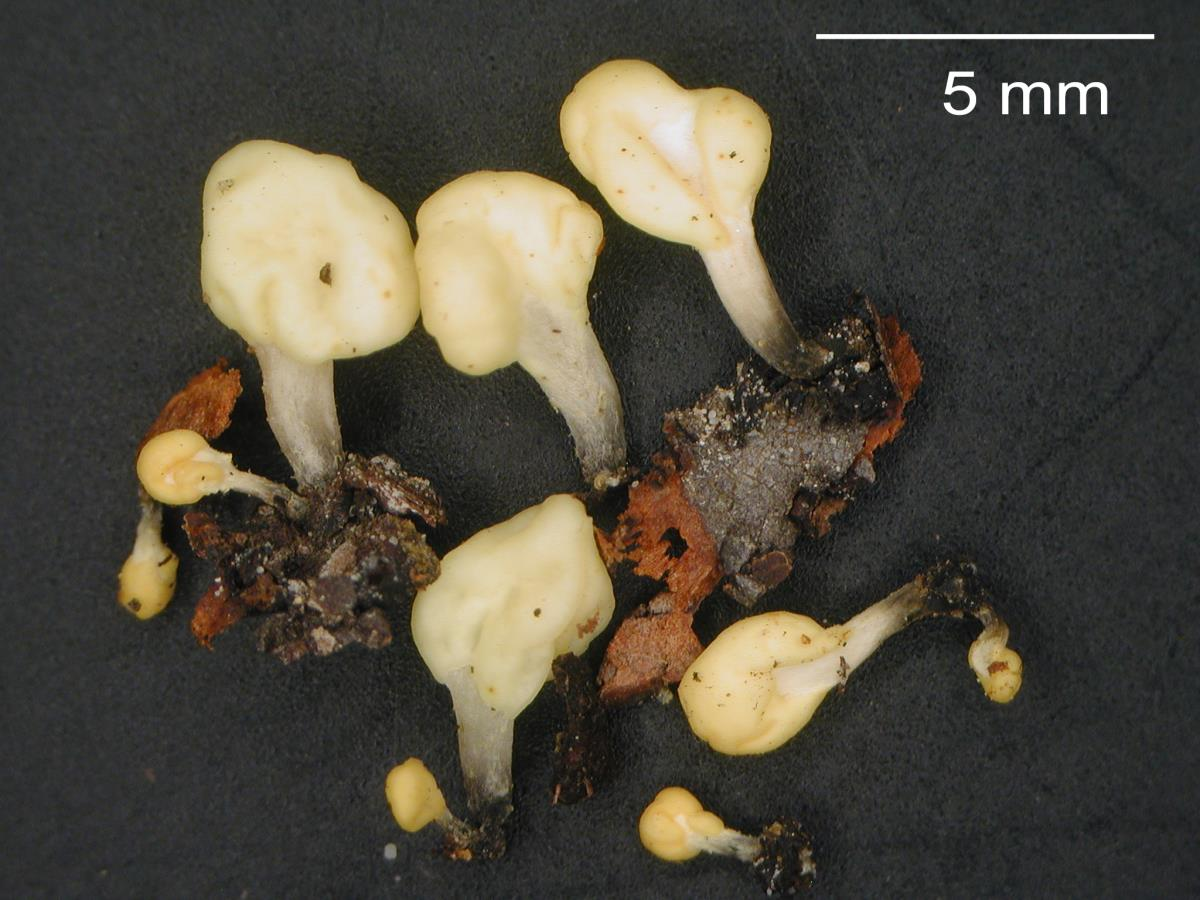

Scientific classification
- Kingdom: Fungi
- Division: Ascomycota
- Class: Leotiomycetes
- Order: Helotiales
- Genus: Mitrulinia; Spooner (1987)
- Species: M. ushuaiae

Binomial name
- Mitrulinia ushuaiae (Rehm) Spooner (1987)

Synonyms
- Mitrula ushuaiae Rehm (1899); Scleromitrula ushuaiae (Rehm) Gamundí (1977)

= Mitrulinia =

Genus of fungi

Mitrulinia is a fungal genus of uncertain familial placement in the order Helotiales. Mitrulinia is a monotypic genus, containing the single species Mitrulinia ushuaiae. The genus was circumscribed in 1987 by mycologist Brian Spooner.

Mitrulinia populations have been found separately in Argentina and on the South Island of New Zealand. Spores or hyphal fragments were also found present in snow on Livingston Island, Antarctica. Individuals found in New Zealand are thought to belong to a novel species rather than Mitrulinia ushuiae.

It produces a stipitate-capitate ascocarp (a fruiting body) arising from a substratal or sclerotial stroma tissue.
