= George Edward Massee =

British mycologist (1850–1917)

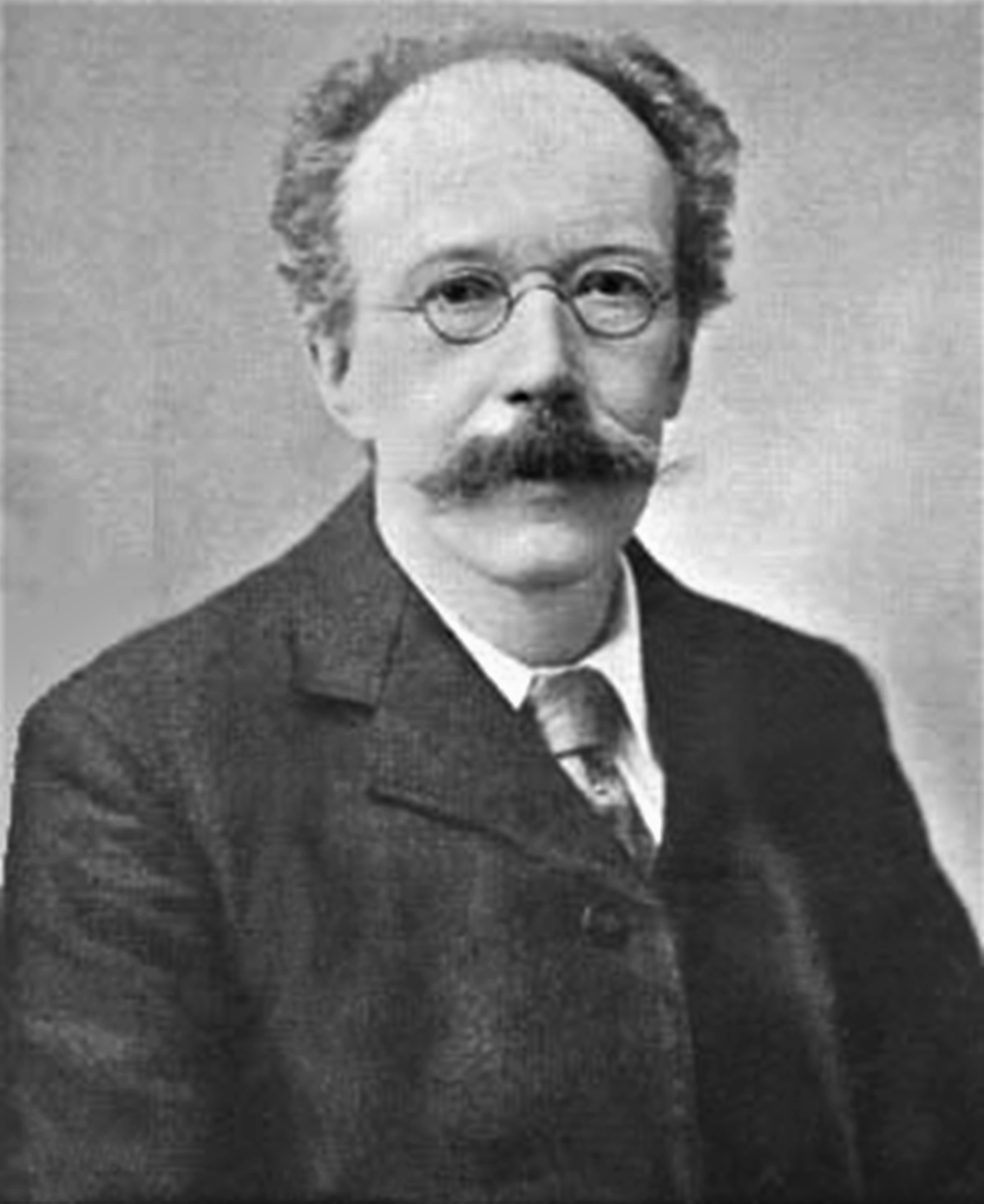
- Born: 20 December 1845; Scampston, East Riding of Yorkshire
- Died: 16 February 1917 (aged 71); Sevenoaks
- Known for: Contributions to taxonomic mycology, botany, and plant pathology
- Scientific career
- Fields: Mycology
- Author abbrev. (botany): Massee

George Edward Massee (20 December 1845 – 16 February 1917) was an English mycologist, plant pathologist, and botanist.

== Background and education ==
George Massee was born in Scampston, East Riding of Yorkshire, the son of a farmer. He was educated at York School of Art and claimed to have attended Downing College, Cambridge, though no record exists of him in the university or College Records.

== South America and the Foreign Legion ==
Massee had an early interest in natural history, publishing an article on British woodpeckers at the age of 16 and compiling a portfolio of botanical paintings. Through the influence of Richard Spruce, a family relative, he was able to travel on a botanical expedition to Panama and Ecuador, where, despite considerable hardships, he collected orchids and other plants.

On his return, Massee joined the French Foreign Legion, hoping to see combat in the Franco-Prussian War, but, the war being almost over, he was prevailed upon to return home to the farm. He had nonetheless gained a "4th Chasseurs" tattoo on his arm as a result of his brief military adventure.

== Mycological career ==
Back in Yorkshire, Massee developed a particular interest in fungi which he illustrated, his paintings attracting the attention of M.C. Cooke, the first head of mycology at the Royal Botanic Gardens, Kew. Having moved to London, he began a series of ambitious publications on fungi, whilst undertaking public lectures, and also working briefly at the Natural History Museum. When Cooke retired from Kew in 1893, Massee replaced him as Principal Assistant in Cryptogams, a post he retained till he himself retired in 1915. From 1904, Massee's assistant at Kew was A.D. Cotton who worked principally on the algae. In 1910 Elsie Wakefield also assisted Massee with the fungi, taking over his position after 1915.

George Massee helped found the British Mycological Society in 1896 and was elected its first President, serving in that capacity from 1896 to 1898. He was awarded the Victoria Medal of Honour in 1902. He was President of the Quekett Microscopical Club from 1899 to 1903. During his career, he published over 250 scientific and popular books, papers, and articles on fungi, myxomycetes, plant pathology, and natural history. He was editor of the cryptogamic journal Grevillea for its final two volumes. Massee also described a substantial number of new fungal species, but (despite working in an herbarium) did not always keep type specimens. As a result, all too many of his new species are now relegated to lists of nomina dubia (names of uncertain application). Most of the collections he did retain are now in the mycological herbarium at Kew. Part of Massee's personal herbarium was, however, sold to the New York Botanical Garden in 1907.

The fungal genera of Masseeella, (in 1895) and Masseea was named after him (in 1899), as were several species, including Acremonium masseei, Ascobolus masseei, Entoloma masseei, and Ocellaria masseeana.

Beatrix Potter, whose mycological interests he encouraged, called him "a very pleasant kind gentleman." His colleague John Ramsbottom said of him that "though often brilliant he was often careless: if he had had any capacity whatever for taking pains he would have been a genius."

== Family ==
Massee's daughter Ivy assisted with the creation of his 1911 book British Fungi by illustrating 40 coloured plates for the publication. His son Arthur Morel Massee, O.B.E., D.Sc., F.R.E.S., was an entomologist.

== Selected publications ==
- Massee, G.E. (1892). A monograph of the Mycogastres. London: Methuen
- Massee, G.E. (1892–1895). The British fungus flora, Vols 1–4. London: George Bell
- Massee, G.E. (1902). European fungus flora: Agaricaceae London: Duckworth
- Massee, G.E. & C. Crossland (1905). The fungus flora of Yorkshire. London: A. Brown
- Massee, G.E. (1910). Diseases of cultivated plants and trees London: Macmillan
- Massee, G.E. & I. Massee (1913). Mildews, rusts, and smuts London: Dulau & Co
