= Josef Velenovský =

Czech naturalist

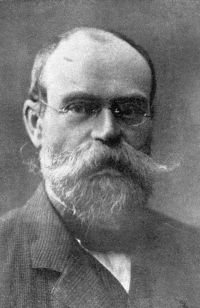
- Born: 22 April 1858; Čekanice (Blatná)
- Died: 7 May 1949 (aged 91); Mnichovice
- Education: Charles University
- Known for: Flora Cretacea Bohemiae; Flora Bulgarica (1891); Ceské Houby
- Scientific career
- Fields: Botany, Mycology, Pteridology, Bryology, Paleontology

Josef Velenovský (22 April 1858 – 7 May 1949) was a Czech botanist, mycologist, pteridologist, and bryologist. He also worked with fossils. He was a research investigator and professor in the Botanical Institute of the University of Prague, alternating with his colleague Ladislav Josef Čelakovský. He was also professor of botany at Charles University, where he concentrated in the study of mycology in the final half of his life. Velenovský collected innumerable specimens, particularly in new central Bohemia. He was a prolific author (or coauthor) of new fungal species, having formally described about 2700 in his career. Many of his type specimens and other collections are located in the herbarium of the Národní Museum of Prague. He closely collaborated with the Czech botanist Václav Stříbrný, for example in offering his exsiccata-like specimen series Flora bulgarica in the 1890th for sale.

== Eponymous taxa ==
- Notocactus velenovsky Frič (1891)
- Trifolium velenovskyi Vandas ex Velen. (1891)
- Tortula velenovskyi Schiffner (1893)
- Centaurea velenovskyi Adamović (1894)
- Astragalus velenovskyi Nábělek, (1923)
- Russula velenovskyi Melzer & Zvára (1927)
- Naucoria velenovskyi Pilát (1930)
- Galium velenovskyi Ančev (1975)
- Entoloma velenovskyi Noordel. (1979)
- Daphne velenovskyi Halda (1981)
- Hilpertia velenovskyi Schiffner & R.H.Zander (1989)
- Cortinarius velenovskyanus Moënne-Locc. & Reumaux (1997)
- Cyanus velenovskyi Adamović, Wagenitz & Greuter (2003)
- Mollisia velenovskyi Gminder (2006)

== Selected publications ==
- Flora Bulgarica. Descriptio et enumeratio systematica plantarum vascularium in principatu Bulgariae sponte nascentium. Pragae: Prostat apud Fr. Řivnáč, bibliopolam. 1891.
- Flora Bulgarica: Descriptio et enumeratio systematica plantarum vascularium in Principatu Bulgariae sponte nascentium; Supplementum I. Pragae: Prostat apud Fr. Řivnáč, bibliopolam. 1898.

== See also ==
- Category:Taxa named by Josef Velenovský
