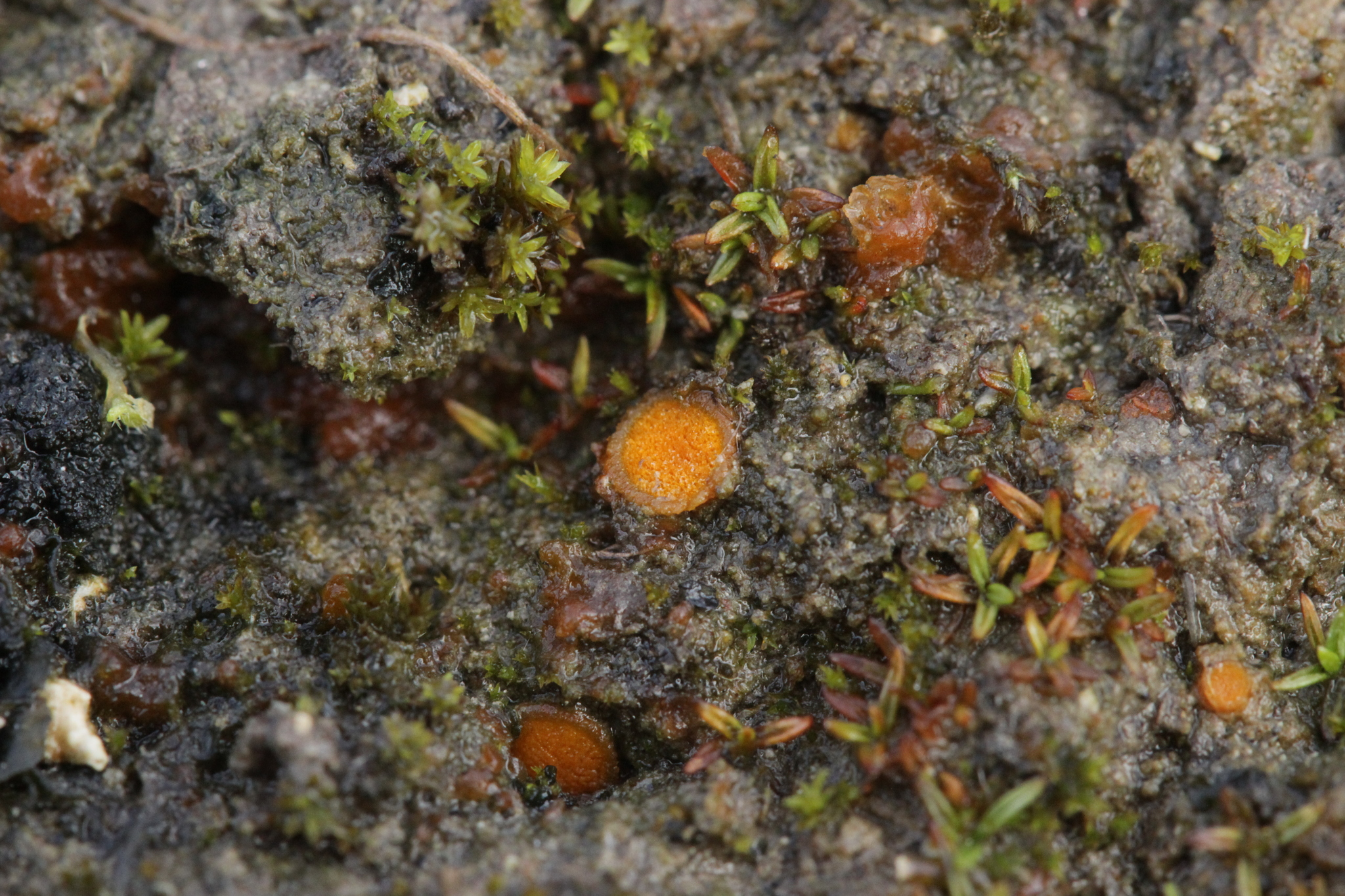
- Lamprospora hispanica

Scientific classification
- Domain: Eukaryota
- Kingdom: Fungi
- Division: Ascomycota
- Class: Pezizomycetes
- Order: Pezizales
- Family: Pyronemataceae
- Genus: Lamprospora; De Not (1863)

Type species
- Lamprospora miniata (H. Crouan & P. Crouan) De Not. (1864)

= Lamprospora =

Genus of fungi

Lamprospora is a genus of fungi in the family Pyronemataceae.

== Species ==
As accepted by Species Fungorum;

- Lamprospora ammophila (Saut.) Boud. (1907)
- Lamprospora aneurae Benkert (1990)
- Lamprospora annulata Seaver (1914)
- Lamprospora asperella (Rehm) Boud. (1907)
- Lamprospora astroidea (Hazsl.) Boud. (1907)
- Lamprospora aurantiaca (Bres.) U. Lindem. (2017)
- Lamprospora bavarica Benkert (2011)
- Lamprospora brevispinosa Seaver (1928)
- Lamprospora cailletii Benkert (1987)
- Lamprospora campylopodis W.D. Buckley (1923)
- Lamprospora carbonicola Boud. (1907)
- Lamprospora crechqueraultii (P. Crouan & H. Crouan) Boud. (1907)
- Lamprospora densireticulata M. Vega, Janošík, Sochorová & Martínez-Gil (2019)
- Lamprospora dicranellae Benkert (1987)
- Lamprospora dictydiola Boud. (1907)
- Lamprospora ecksteinii Benkert (2009)
- Lamprospora exasperata (Berk. & M.A. Curtis) Seaver (1928)
- Lamprospora faroensis Benkert (1987)
- Lamprospora funigera McLennan & Cookson (1926)
- Lamprospora gotlandica Benkert (1987)
- Lamprospora hispanica Benkert (1987)
- Lamprospora hungarica Bánhegyi (1941)
- Lamprospora irregulariata K.B. Khare & V.P. Tewari (1978)
- Lamprospora knajaschensis (P. Karst.) Boud. (1907)
- Lamprospora kristiansenii Benkert (1990)
- Lamprospora leptodictya Dissing (1981)
- Lamprospora lubicensis Benkert (1994)
- Lamprospora miniata De Not. (1863)
- Lamprospora minuta (Velen.) Svrček (1977)
- Lamprospora modesta (P. Karst.) Boud. (1907)
- Lamprospora modestissima Grelet (1926)
- Lamprospora moynei Benkert (1987)
- Lamprospora nigrans (Morgan) Seaver (1914)
- Lamprospora norvegica Benkert, Aas & R. Kristiansen (1991)
- Lamprospora polytrichina Rehm ex Seaver (1914)
- Lamprospora pseudoarvensis M. Vega, Eckstein, Friebes & R. Tena (2017)
- Lamprospora rehmii Benkert (1987)
- Lamprospora retinosa (Velen.) T. Schumach. (1993)
- Lamprospora retispora (Itzerott & Thate) T. Schumach. (1986)
- Lamprospora rugensis Benkert (1987)
- Lamprospora schroeteri Benkert (1976)
- Lamprospora seaveri Benkert (1987)
- Lamprospora sphagnicola Seaver (1934)
- Lamprospora spitsbergensis T. Schumach. (1993)
- Lamprospora sylvatica Egertová & Eckstein (2018)
- Lamprospora tortulae-ruralis Benkert (1987)
- Lamprospora tropica (Rehm) Sacc. (1928)
- Lamprospora varanasiensis K.B. Khare & V.P. Tewari (1978)
- Lamprospora verrucispora M. Vega, Eckstein & Van der Kolk (2016)
- Lamprospora verruculosa (Sacc.) Boedijn (1951)
- Lamprospora wisconsinensis Seaver (1928)
- Lamprospora wrightii (Berk. & M.A. Curtis) Boud. (1904)

Former species;

- L. amethystina (Quél.) Seaver (1914) = Marcelleina persoonii Pezizaceae family
- L. areolata Seaver (1912) = Octospora areolata
- L. areolata var. australis McLennan & Cookson (1923) = Octospora australis
- L. arvensis (Velen.) Svrček (1979) = Octospora arvensis
- L. ascoboloides Seaver (1914) = Octospora ascoboloides
- L. astroidea var. lichenicola (Gonz. Frag.) E.K. Cash (1972) = Lamprospora astroidea
- L. australis (McLennan & Cookson) Rifai (1968) = Octospora australis
- L. biannulata Beauseign. (1946) = Octospora biannulata
- L. calospora (Quél.) J. Moravec (1969) = Moravecia calospora
- L. carbonaria (Fuckel) Seaver (1914) = Pulvinula carbonaria Pulvinulaceae
- L. cashiae Gamundí (1973) = Octospora cashiae
- L. chopraiana L.R. Batra (1961) = Marcelleina chopraiana Pezizaceae
- L. cinnabarina (Fuckel) Kalymb. (1969) = Pulvinula cinnabarina Pulvinulaceae
- L. constellatio (Berk. & Broome) Seaver (1914) = Pulvinula convexella Pulvinulaceae
- L. crechqueraultii var. macrantha Boud. (1907) = Lamprospora crechqueraultii
- L. crechqueraultii var. modesta (P. Karst.) Gamundí (1975) = Lamprospora modesta
- L. crechqueraultii var. ovalispora Svrček & Kubička (1963) = Octospora ovalispora
- L. crechqueraultii var. paludosa Dennis (1956) = Oviascoma paludosum
- L. crouanii (Cooke) Seaver (1914) = Lamprospora miniata
- L. crouanii f. magnihyphosa J. Moravec (1969) = Lamprospora miniata
- L. detonia Brenckle (1916) = Phaeopezia detonia Pezizaceae
- L. discoidea (Henn. & E. Nyman) Seaver (1914) = Pulvinula discoidea Pulvinulaceae
- L. ditrichi Benkert (1987) = Octospora ditrichi
- L. feurichiana (Kirschst.) Benkert (1976) = Octospora feurichiana
- L. fulgens (Pers.) Snyder (1936) = Caloscypha fulgens Caloscyphaceae
- L. georgii Svrček (1958) = Marcelleina georgii Pezizaceae
- L. haemastigma (Hedw.) Seaver (1914) = Humaria haemastigma
- L. haemastigma var. gigantea K.S. Thind & Pr. Singh (1959) = Humaria haemastigma
- L. hanffii Benkert (1987) = Octospora hanffii
- L. insignispora (Boud. & Torrend) Sacc. (1928) = Octospora insignispora
- L. jetelae Vacek (1949) = Pulparia jetelae Pulvinulaceae
- L. laetirubra (Cooke) Lagarde (1906) = Pulvinula cinnabarina Pulvinulaceae
- L. leiocarpa (Curr.) Seaver (1914) = Plicaria endocarpoides
- L. lobata (Berk. & M.A. Curtis) Seaver (1914) = Lazuardia lobata
- L. lutziana Boud. (1917) = Octospora lutziana
- L. macrantha (Boud.) Seaver (1928) = Lamprospora crechqueraultii
- L. maireana Seaver (1914) = Octospora maireana
- L. miniata f. parvispora Benkert (1987) = Lamprospora miniata
- L. miniata var. parvispora Benkert (2000)= Lamprospora miniata'
- L. miniata var. ratisbonensis Benkert (2000) = Lamprospora miniata
- L. miniata var. retispora (Itzerott & Thate) Itzerott & Thate (1979) = Lamprospora retispora
- L. miniatopsis Spooner (1980) = Octospora miniatopsis
- L. multiguttula L.R. Batra (1961) = Pulvinula multiguttula Pulvinulaceae
- L. mussooriensis K.S. Thind, E.K. Cash & Pr. Singh (1959) = Pulvinula mussooriensis Pulvinulaceae
- L. ovalispora (Svrček & Kubička) Eckblad (1968) = Octospora ovalispora
- L. paechnatzii Benkert (1987) = Octospora paechnatzii
- L. planchonis (Dunal ex Boud.) Seaver (1914) = Smardaea planchonis
- L. planchonis var. ovalispora (Grelet) E.K. Cash (1972) = Smardaea ovalispora
- L. polytrichi (Schumach.) Le Gal (1940) = Octospora polytrichi
- L. pyrophila Snyder (1936) = Pulvinula pyrophila); Pulvinulaceae
- L. rickii (Rehm) Boud. (1907) = Marcelleina rickii); Pezizaceae
- L. salmonicolor Seaver (1925) = Pulvinula salmonicolor); Pulvinulaceae
- L. spinulosa Seaver (1914) = Octospora spinulosa
- L. spinulosa var. magnispora K.S. Thind & L.R. Batra (1957) = Octospora spinulosa
- L. tetraspora Hansf. (1954) = Pulvinula tetraspora Pulvinulaceae
- L. trachycarpa (Curr.) Seaver (1914) = Plicaria trachycarpa
- L. trachycarpa var. ferruginea (Fuckel) K.S. Thind & Sethy (1957) = Plicaria trachycarpa
- L. tuberculata sensu Maire (1915) = Octospora maireana
- L. tuberculata Seaver (1912) = Octospora tuberculata
- L. tuberculatella Seaver (1914) = Octospora tuberculatella

Note; if no family shown, still within the Pyronemataceae Family.
