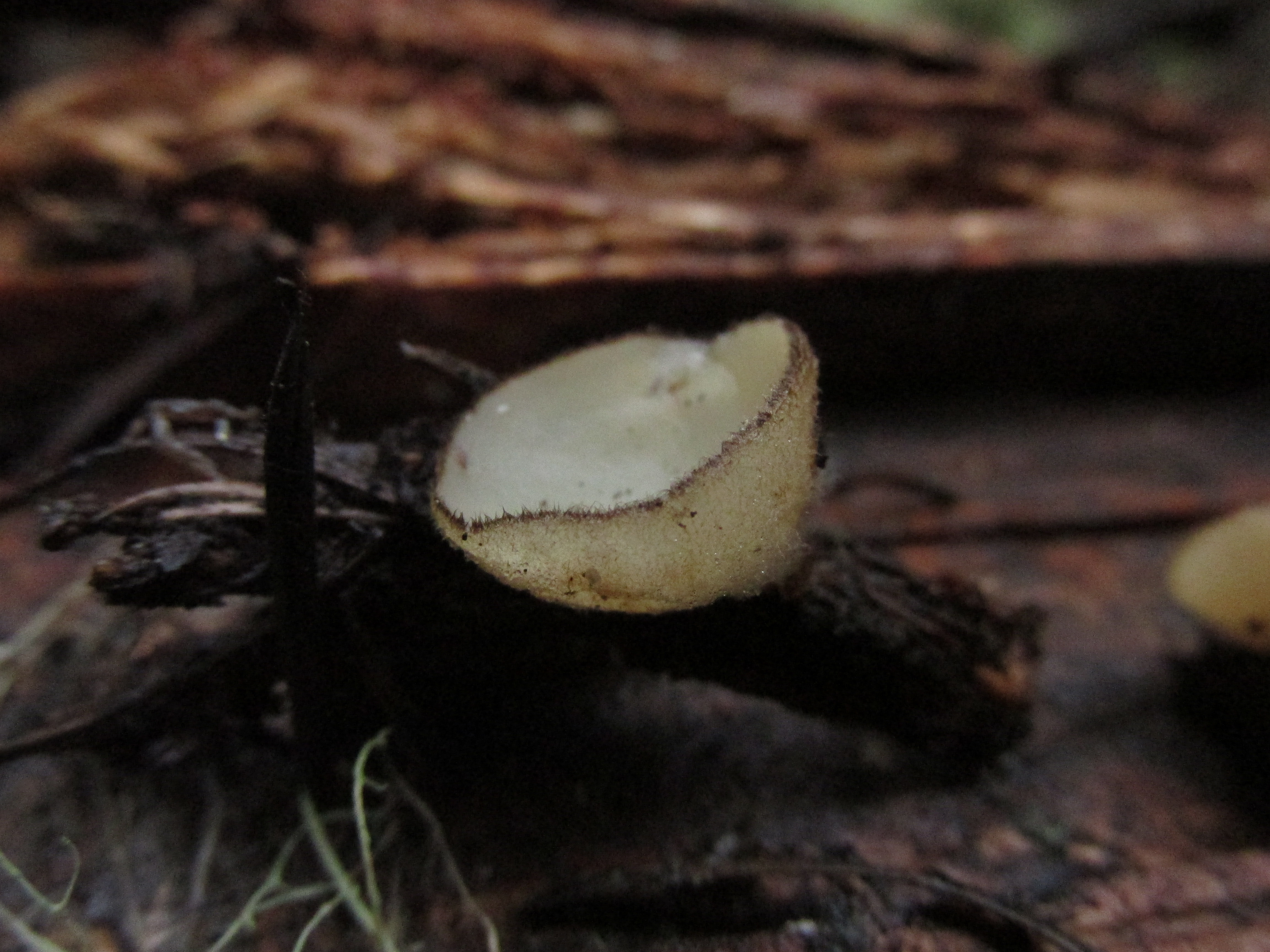

Scientific classification
- Domain: Eukaryota
- Kingdom: Fungi
- Division: Ascomycota
- Class: Pezizomycetes
- Order: Pezizales
- Family: Pyronemataceae
- Genus: Chaetothiersia; B.A.Perry & Pfister (2008)
- Species: C. vernalis

Binomial name
- Chaetothiersia vernalis B.A.Perry & Pfister (2008)

= Chaetothiersia =

Genus of fungi

Chaetothiersia is a fungal genus in the family Pyronemataceae. It is monotypic, containing the single species Chaetothiersia vernalis collected from California.

== Description ==
This species is characterized by having stiff brown hairs on the surface of the ectal excipulum, the outer layer of the apothecium. The ectal excipulum is thin, and made of roughly spherical to somewhat spherical/angular cells. Its ascospores are smooth, and do not contain oil droplets.

=== Lookalikes ===
Genera with species that bear a resemblance to C. vernalis include Geopora, Humaria, Trichophaea, Trichophaeopsis, Tricharina, most of which are distinguishable only by examining microscopic characteristics.

== Etymology ==
The etymology of the generic name is derived from the Greek chaeto, meaning hairy (a reference to both the external hairs on the cups and to Dr. Thiers' first name), and "thiersia", in honor of mycologist Harry Thiers, one of the first to collect this specimen.

== Distribution and habitat ==
Collected from the northern High Sierra Nevada of California, it has been found growing in groups on the decaying wood and bark of the conifer Abies magnifica.
