= Stephensia =

Stephensia is the scientific name for two genera of organisms and may refer to:

- Stephensia (fungus), a genus of fungi in the family Pyronemataceae
- Stephensia (moth), a genus of moths in the family Elachistidae
- Stephensia (fly), a synonym of genus Microsoma, flies in the family Tachinidae
