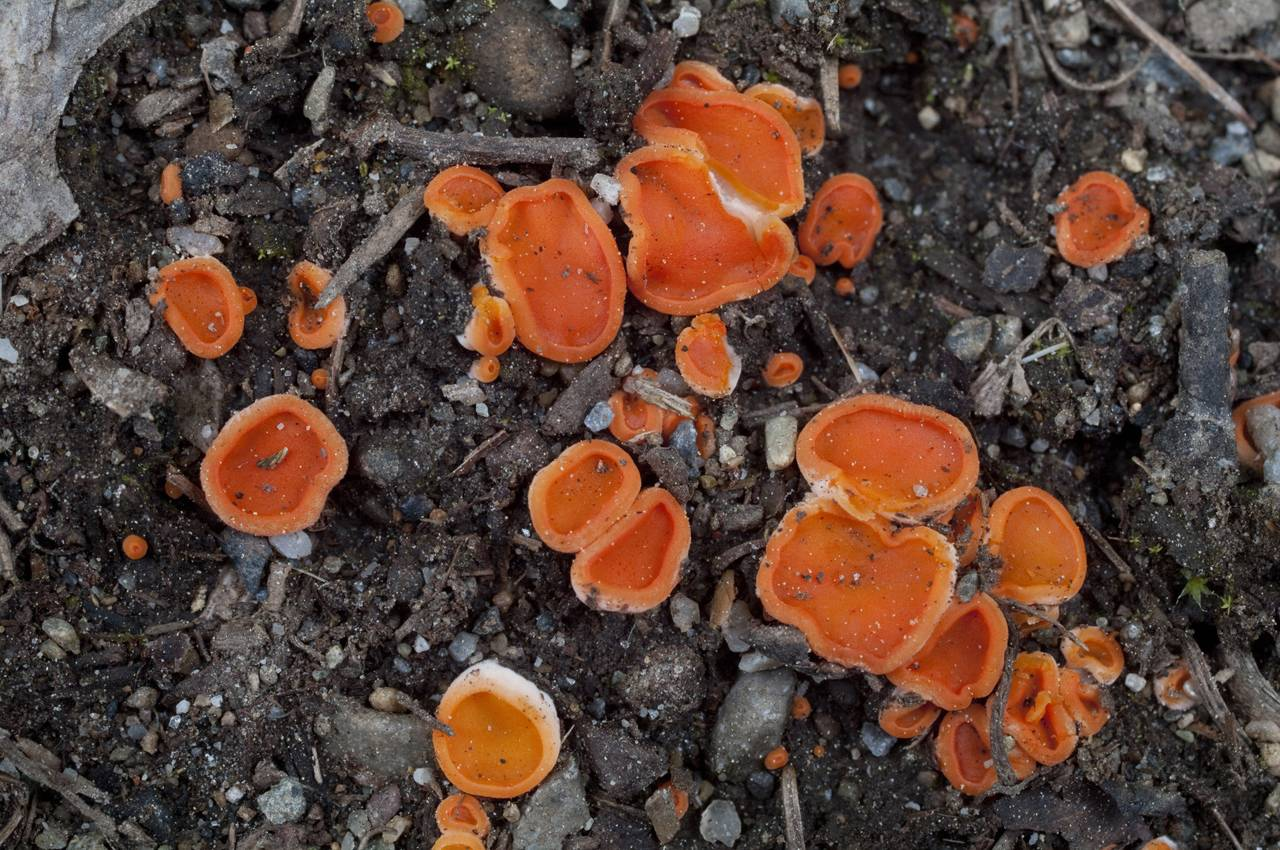
- Pulvinula convexella

Scientific classification
- Kingdom: Fungi
- Division: Ascomycota
- Class: Pezizomycetes
- Order: Pezizales
- Family: Pyronemataceae
- Genus: Pulvinula; Boud. (1885)

Type species
- Pulvinula convexella (P.Karst.) Pfister (1976)

Synonyms
- Pulparia P.Karst. (1866)

= Pulvinula =

Genus of fungi

Pulvinula is a genus of fungi in the family Pyronemataceae. The genus was described by French mycologist Jean Louis Émile Boudier in 1885.

== Species ==
- Pulvinula alba
- Pulvinula albida
- Pulvinula anthracobia
- Pulvinula archeri
- Pulvinula carbonaria
- Pulvinula cinnabarina
- Pulvinula convexella
- Pulvinula discoidea
- Pulvinula etiolata
- Pulvinula globifera
- Pulvinula guizhouensis
- Pulvinula johannis
- Pulvinula lacteoalba
- Pulvinula laeterubra
- Pulvinula miltina
- Pulvinula minor
- Pulvinula multiguttula
- Pulvinula mussooriensis
- Pulvinula neotropica
- Pulvinula nepalensis
- Pulvinula niveoalba
- Pulvinula orichalcea
- Pulvinula pyrophila
- Pulvinula salmonicolor
- Pulvinula subaurantia
- Pulvinula tetraspora
