= Psilopezia =

Scientific classification
- Domain: Eukaryota
- Kingdom: Fungi
- Division: Ascomycota
- Class: Pezizomycetes
- Order: Pezizales
- Family: Pyronemataceae
- Genus: Psilopezia; Berk. (1847)

Type species
- Psilopezia nummularia Berk. (as 'nummularis') (1847)

Species
- P. albida P. bohemica P. dabaensis P. deligata P. nummularia P. nummularialis

Genus of fungi

Psilopezia is a genus of fungi in the family Pyronemataceae. The genus was circumscribed by British mycologist Miles Berkeley in 1847.
