= Guyanemidae =

Scientific classification
- Kingdom: Animalia
- Phylum: Nematoda
- Class: Chromadorea
- Order: Rhabditida
- Family: Guyanemidae

Family of roundworms

Guyanemidae is a family of nematodes belonging to the order Rhabditida.

Genera:

- Guyanema Petter, 1975
- Histodytes Aragort, Alvarez, Iglesias, Leiro & Sanmartin, 2002
- Ichthyofilaria Yamaguti, 1935
- Ichthyofilaroides Moravec & Justine, 2020
- Moravecia Ribu & Lester, 2004
- Pseudodelphis Adamson & Roth, 1990
- Travassosnema Moreira & de Oliveira, 1992
