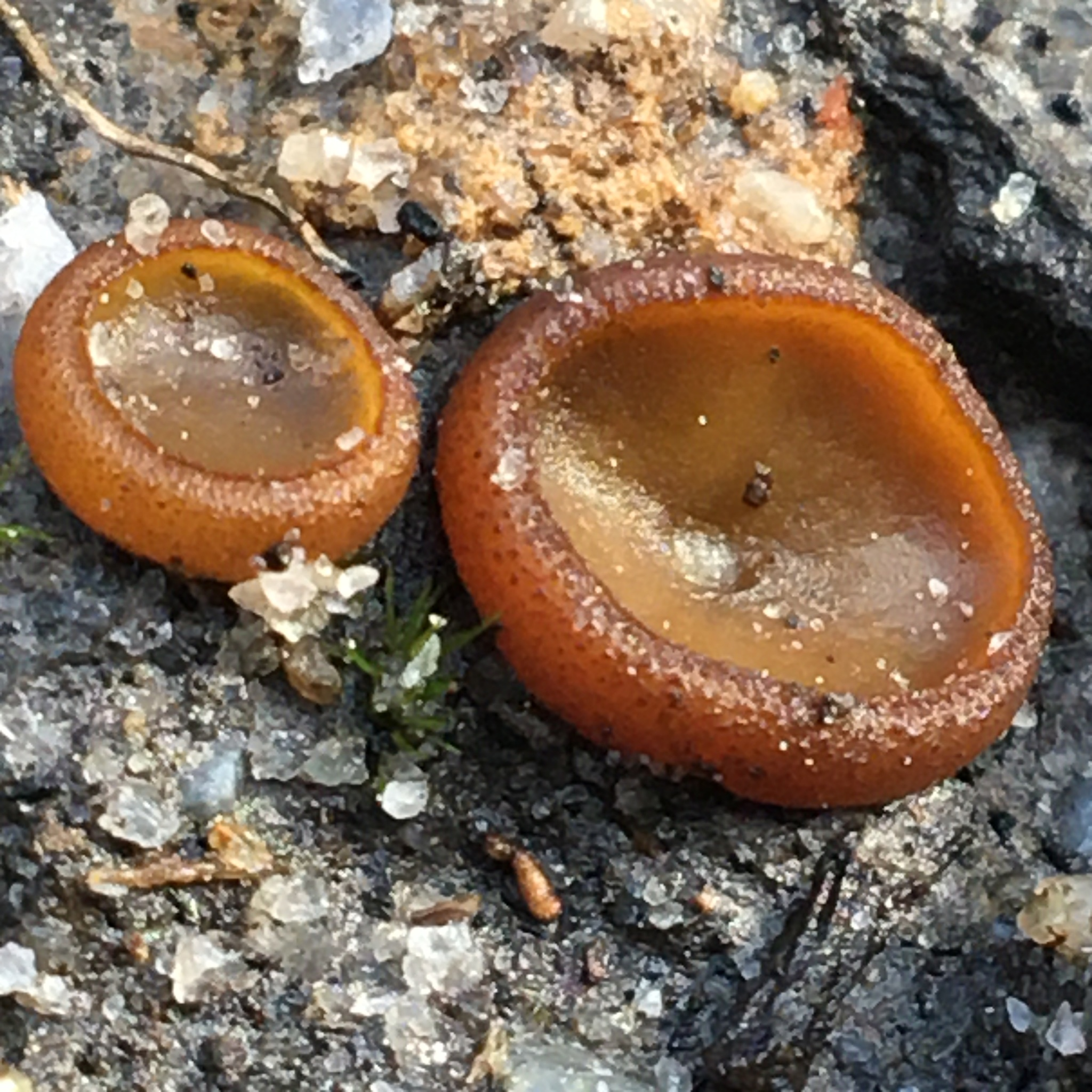
- Aleurina ferruginea - fleshy cup fungus

Scientific classification
- Domain: Eukaryota
- Kingdom: Fungi
- Division: Ascomycota
- Class: Pezizomycetes
- Order: Pezizales
- Family: Pyronemataceae
- Genus: Aleurina
- Species: A. ferruginea

Binomial name
- Aleurina ferruginea (W.Phillips) W.Y.Zhuang & Korf (1986)

Synonyms
- Rhizina ferruginea W.Phillips (1888); Jafneadelphus ferrugineus (W.Phillips) Rifai (1968)

= Aleurina ferruginea =

Species of fungus

Aleurina ferruginea is a fungus species in the family Pyronemataceae.
