= Anixia buxi =

Scientific classification
- Domain: Eukaryota
- Kingdom: Fungi
- Division: Basidiomycota
- Class: Agaricomycetes
- Genus: Anixia
- Species: A. buxi

Binomial name
- Anixia buxi (Mangin) Sacc.

Species of fungus

Anixia buxi is a species of fungus belonging to the Anixia genus. It was documented in 1882. Its basionym is Orbicula buxi, which belongs to the Orbicula genus, but its taxonomy is uncertain.
