= Rhodoscypha =

Scientific classification
- Domain: Eukaryota
- Kingdom: Fungi
- Division: Ascomycota
- Class: Pezizomycetes
- Order: Pezizales
- Family: Pyronemataceae
- Genus: Rhodoscypha; Dissing & Sivertsen (1983)

Type species
- Rhodoscypha ovilla (Peck) Dissing & Sivertsen (1983)

Synonyms
- Peziza ovilla Peck (1876); Neottiella ovilla (Peck) Sacc.(1889); Patella ovilla (Peck) Seaver (1928); Leucoscypha ovilla (Peck) Harmaja (1977)

Genus of fungi

Rhodoscypha is a fungal genus in the family Pyronemataceae (class Pezizomycetes). It is a monotypic genus, containing the single species Rhodoscypha ovilla, originally described in 1876 by Charles Horton Peck as a species of Peziza.
