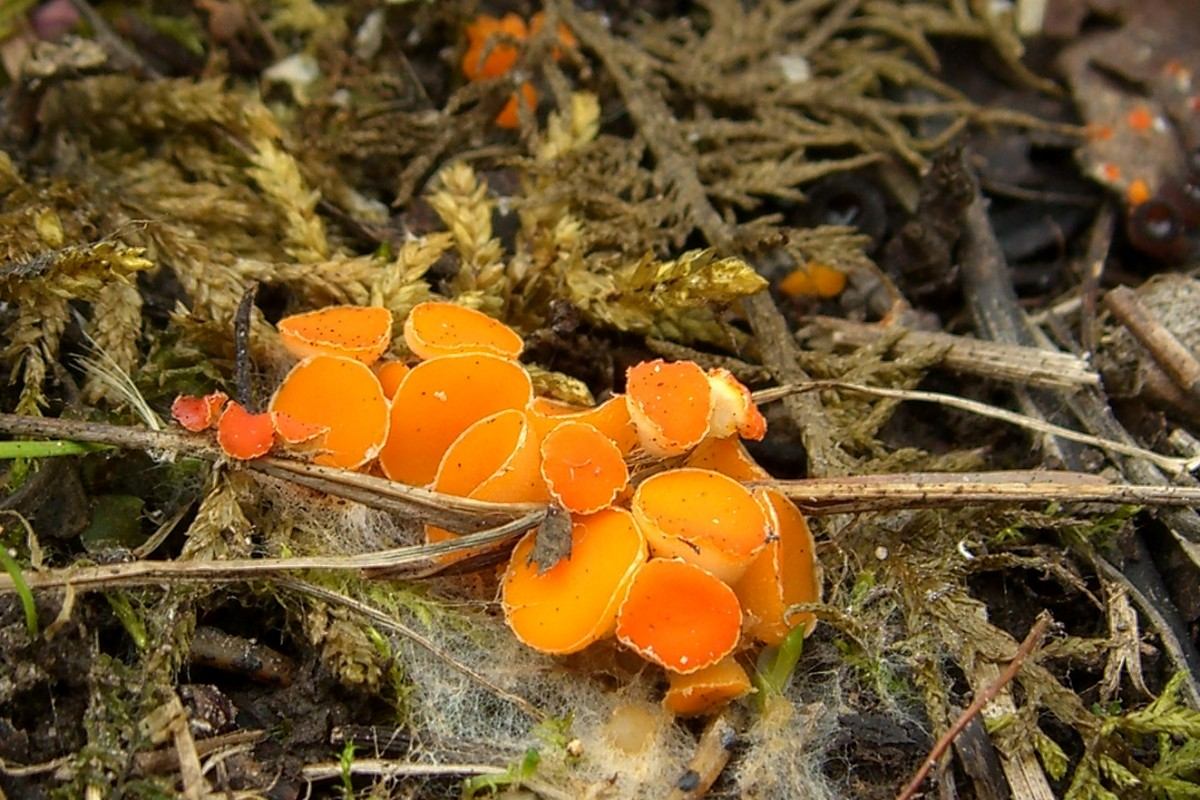

Scientific classification
- Domain: Eukaryota
- Kingdom: Fungi
- Division: Ascomycota
- Class: Pezizomycetes
- Order: Pezizales
- Family: Pyronemataceae
- Genus: Byssonectria
- Species: B. fusispora

Binomial name
- Byssonectria fusispora Berk., 1846

= Byssonectria fusispora =

Species of fungus

Byssonectria fusispora is a species of apothecial fungus belonging to the family Pyronemataceae.

This is a European species appearing as bright yellow-orange discs up to 3 mm in diameter thickly clustered on soil and rotting plant material, often at fire sites.
