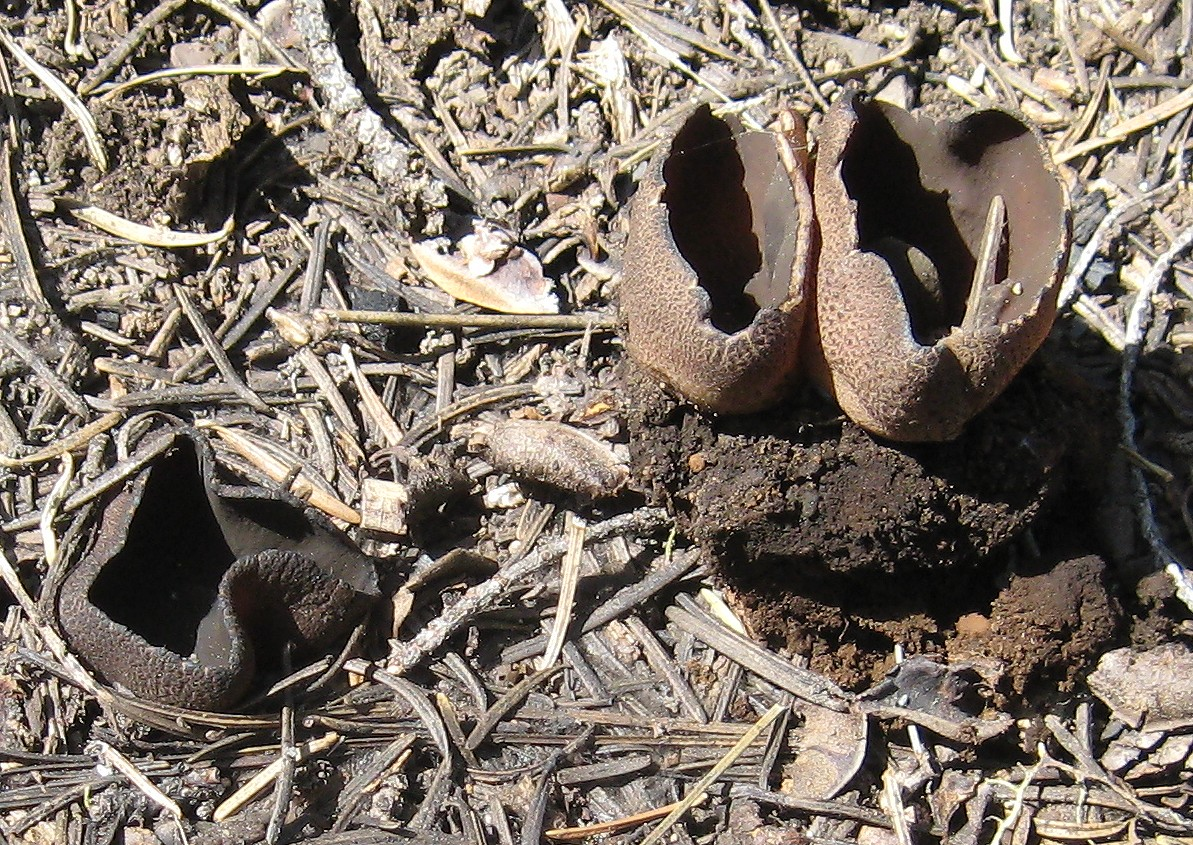
- Plicaria endocarpoides

Scientific classification
- Kingdom: Fungi
- Division: Ascomycota
- Class: Pezizomycetes
- Order: Pezizales
- Family: Pezizaceae
- Genus: Plicaria; Fuckel

Type species
- Plicaria trachycarpa (Curr.) Boud.

= Plicaria =

Genus of fungi

Plicaria is a genus of fungi within the Pezizaceae family. The genus contains about 10 species, widely distributed in temperate areas.

== Species ==
Some species include:

- Plicaria carbonaria
- Plicaria endocarpoides
- Plicaria trachycarpa
