= Rhodotarzetta =

Scientific classification
- Domain: Eukaryota
- Kingdom: Fungi
- Division: Ascomycota
- Class: Pezizomycetes
- Order: Pezizales
- Family: Pyronemataceae
- Genus: Rhodotarzetta; Dissing & Sivertsen (1983)

Type species
- Rhodotarzetta rosea (Rea) Dissing & Sivertsen (1983)

Genus of fungi

Rhodotarzetta is a genus of fungi in the family Pyronemataceae.
