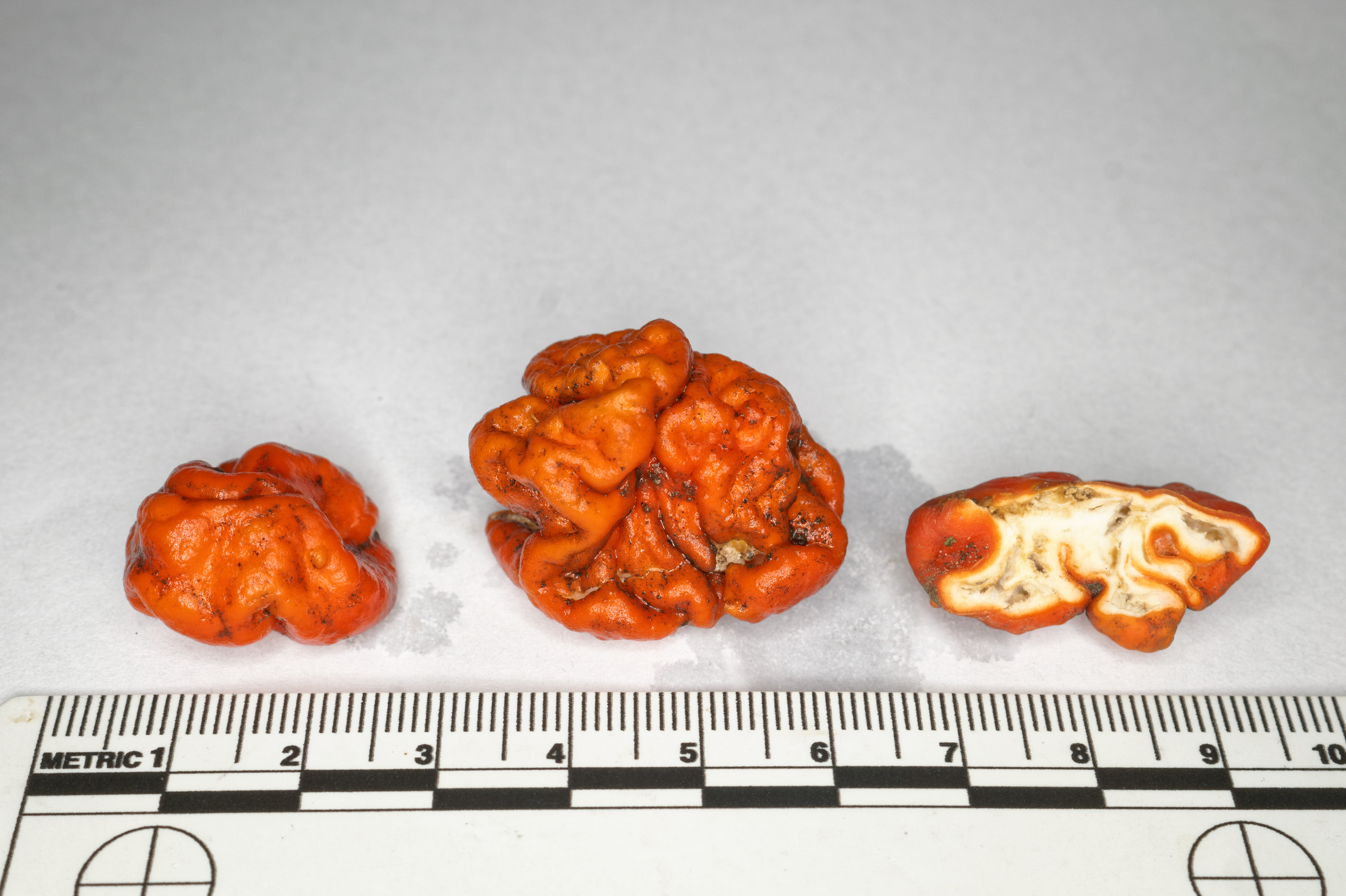

Scientific classification
- Kingdom: Fungi
- Division: Ascomycota
- Class: Pezizomycetes
- Order: Pezizales
- Family: Pyronemataceae
- Genus: Paurocotylis
- Species: P. pila

Binomial name
- Paurocotylis pila Berkeley, 1855 - fungi

= Paurocotylis pila =

Scarlet Berry Truffle

Species of fungus

Paurocotylis pila, commonly known as the scarlet berry truffle, is an ascomycete fungus in the genus Paurocotylis. It was first described by Miles Joseph Berkley in 1855.

This species is native to New Zealand and Australia and is naturalized in the United Kingdom. It often appears in forests under podocarp trees such as tōtara; however, it also occurs in gardens, forest tracks, and parks.

== Taxonomy ==
First described in 1855 by Miles Joseph Berkeley in Joseph Dalton Hooker's The Botany of the Antarctic Voyage II, Flora Novae-Zealandiae, the type specimen was found 'on the ground' and was collected by William Colenso in Hāwera, South Taranaki in the North Island of New Zealand.

Paurocotylis pila is the only species from the genus Paurocotylis found in New Zealand.

=== Etymology ===
Greek, pauro means few and cotylis means cavity, possibly referring to the observed interior of the type specimen. Latin, pila means sphere, presumably referring to the shape of the fruit body.

== Description ==
This truffle-like fungus produces a spherical to tuber-shaped fruit body (ascoma) with a smooth surface, which can be lobed or wrinkled. Paurocotylis pila's fruiting body is ball shaped, with a thin, matte red-orange outer rind and has no stalk. Often the rind is creased, but occasionally is smooth. Varying in size, it ranges from 10-30mm across, and is found half buried in soil, or under leaf litter. The fruit body is made of yellow-brown tissue, with multiple hollow chambers. Inside the chambers, the asci break up to leave round, cream or yellow ascospores. Once collected and dried, the rind's colour changes to a dull red-brown. P. pila fruit bodies usually range from 10–40 millimetres (1/2–1 1/2 in) in diameter, although some in the UK are up to 60 mm. The fruit body does not have a stipe. There is no odour noted and it is regarded as non-edible.

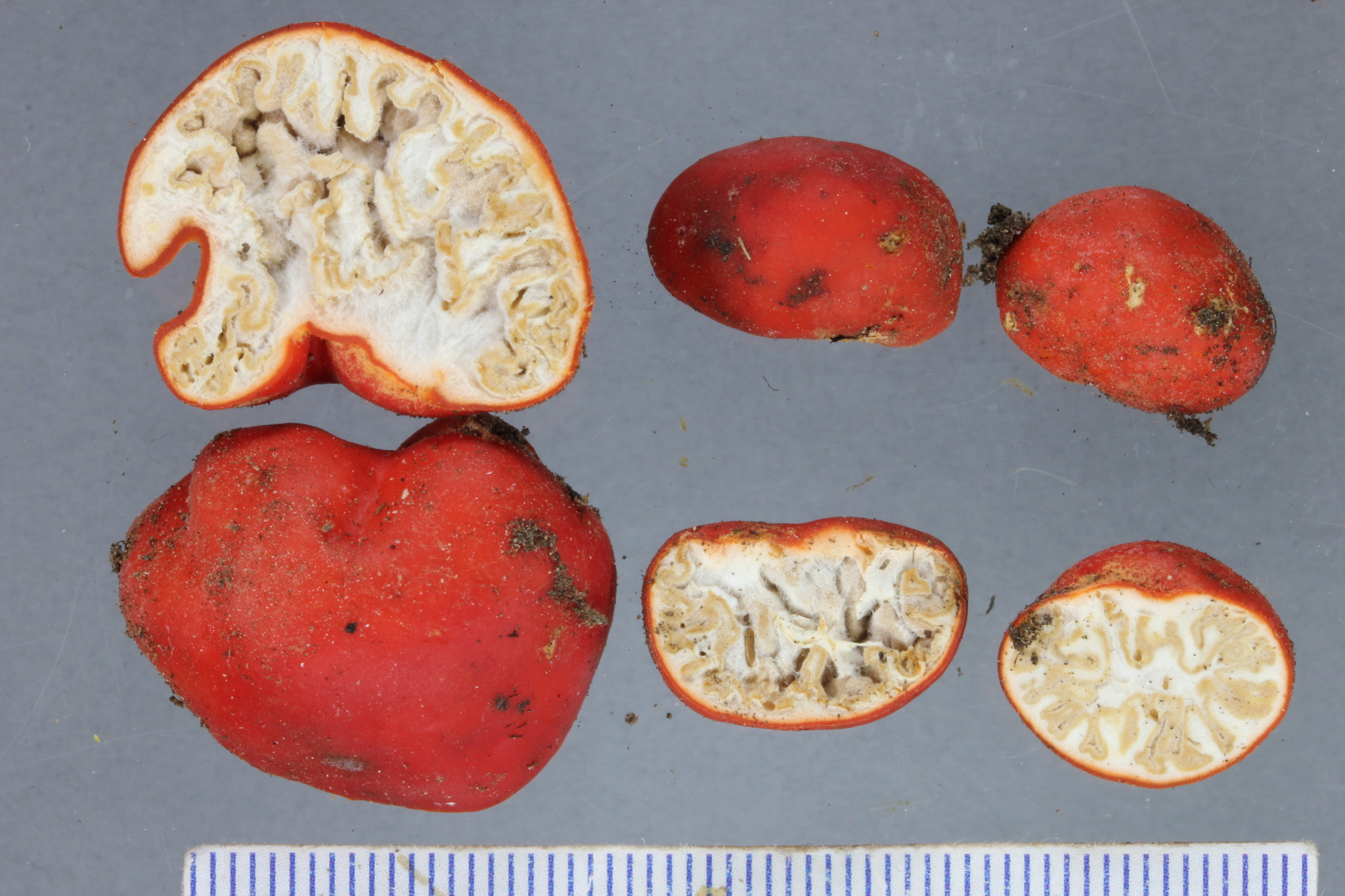
Cross-section of P. pila

== Range ==
DNA barcode (internal transcribed spacer) sequences in the National Center for Biotechnology Information database indicate a distribution in New Zealand, Australia and the United Kingdom.

=== Natural global range ===
This species is native to New Zealand, however, it has been introduced to England. In England, it has spread to Nottingham, Yorkshire, Sheffield, and more. Paurocotylis pila is also native to Tasmania, and has been found in Australia.

=== New Zealand range ===
Paurocotylis pila is found all across New Zealand; often appearing in forests under podocarp trees such as totara. However, it also occurs in gardens, forest tracks, and parks.

== Habitat ==
This species is found in leaf litter and soil in forests, parks and gardens. Paurocotylis pila prefers disturbed forests, and is often found in soil near tracks. It has even been found in abandoned gravel pits. In England, it has been found fruiting in garden soil. Paurocotylis pila has been found near tracks in forest parks, under Podocarpus. Disturbed soil may make it easier for the fruit bodies to be spotted, or that they are seen more in those areas because it is where observers are. It is thought that due to their berry-like shape and striking colour, birds play a role in their dispersal.

Experts have suggested that some members of this genus and related genera of fungi may change between being saprobic and endophytic throughout its life. This is unlikely for this species since it is found under various tree species.

== Ecology ==
=== Life cycle/Phenology ===
Paurocotylis pila is a saprobic species that grows underground. The fruiting bodies emerge after warm rain, mainly in autumn. After emerging from underground, Paurocotylis pila often remains partially covered by soil or leaf litter. From there, it is presumed to be dispersed by ground-foraging birds looking for fallen fruit. Fruiting in autumn, Paurocotylis pila coincides with podocarp trees fruiting in the forest. As its colour resembles the fruit, it attracts birds. Bird dispersal has likely assisted it in its spread throughout England, with specimens found in England with damage from birds pecking.

=== Predators, Parasites, and Diseases ===
Birds eat this species, which likely aids in its dispersal. Supporting evidence for bird dispersal is peck marks, often seen on Paurocotylis pila. It is unknown if any other predators, diseases, or parasites live on this species. Evidence of Ascomycota fungi being eaten by moa was found in moa coprolite. This shows that this species may have been eaten and dispersed by moa, but it is unknown which bird species are continuing to spread it today. Given that the species is spreading in the UK, some introduced birds may be spreading the it alongside native species.
