= Geneosperma =

Scientific classification
- Domain: Eukaryota
- Kingdom: Fungi
- Division: Ascomycota
- Class: Pezizomycetes
- Order: Pezizales
- Family: Pyronemataceae
- Genus: Geneosperma; Rifai (1968)

Type species
- Geneosperma geneosporum Rifai (as geneospora) (1968)

Species
- Geneosperma geneosporum Geneosperma laevisporum

Genus of fungi

Geneosperma is a genus of fungi in the family Pyronemataceae.
