= Smardaea =

Scientific classification
- Kingdom: Fungi
- Division: Ascomycota
- Class: Pezizomycetes
- Order: Pezizales
- Family: Pyronemataceae
- Genus: Smardaea; Svrček (1969)

Type species
- Smardaea amethystina (W. Phillips) Svrček (1969)

Genus of fungi

Smardaea is a genus of fungi in the family Pyronemataceae.

The genus was circumscribed by Mirko Svrček in Česká mykologie vol. 23 on page 90 in 1969.

The genus name of Smardaea is in honour of František Šmarda (1902–1976), who was a Czech botanist and mycologist, also teacher in Brno.

== Species ==
As accepted by Species Fungorum;

- Smardaea amethystina (W. Phillips) Svrček (1969)
- Smardaea australis P.S. Catches. & D.E.A. Catches. (2017)
- Smardaea marchica (Benkert & J. Moravec) Benkert (2005)
- Smardaea microspora J.Z. Cao, L. Fan & B. Liu (1990)
- Smardaea ovalispora (Grelet) Van Vooren (2009)
- Smardaea planchonis (Dunal ex Boud.) Korf & W.Y. Zhuang (1991)
- Smardaea protea W.Y. Zhuang & Korf (1986)
- Smardaea purpurea Dissing (1986)
- Smardaea reticulosperma (Donadini, Riousset & G. Riousset) Benkert (2005)
- Smardaea verrucispora (Donadini & Monier) Benkert (2005)
