= Leucoscypha =

Scientific classification
- Domain: Eukaryota
- Kingdom: Fungi
- Division: Ascomycota
- Class: Pezizomycetes
- Order: Pezizales
- Family: Pyronemataceae
- Genus: Leucoscypha; Boud. (1885)

Type species
- Leucoscypha leucotricha (Alb. & Schwein.) Boud. (1907)

Genus of fungi

Leucoscypha is a genus of fungi in the family Pyronemataceae.

== Species ==
- Leucoscypha alpestris (Sommerf.) Eckblad, 1968
- Leucoscypha erminea (E. Bommer & M. Rousseau) Boud., 1907
- Leucoscypha fossulae (Limm. ex Cooke) Boud., 1907
- Leucoscypha leucotricha (Alb. & Schwein.) Boud., 1907
- Leucoscypha ricciae (P. Crouan & H. Crouan) Dennis, 1971
