= Orbicula richenii =

Scientific classification
- Kingdom: Fungi
- Division: Ascomycota
- Class: Pezizomycetes
- Order: Pezizales
- Family: Pseudombrophilaceae
- Genus: Orbicula
- Species: O. richenii

Binomial name
- Orbicula richenii Rick (1904)

Species of fungus

Orbicula richenii is a species of fungus belonging to the Orbicula genus. It was documented in 1904 by Brazilian mycologist Johannes Rick.
