= Lathraeodiscus =

Scientific classification
- Kingdom: Fungi
- Division: Ascomycota
- Class: Pezizomycetes
- Order: Pezizales
- Family: Pyronemataceae
- Genus: Lathraeodiscus; Dissing & Sivertsen (1989)

Type species
- Lathraeodiscus arcticus Dissing & Sivertsen (1989)

Genus of fungi

Lathraeodiscus is a genus of fungi in the family Pyronemataceae. It is monotypic, containing the single species Lathraeodiscus arcticus. This species has been found in the lowland high-arctic areas of Greenland and in Svalbard, Norway.
