= Micronematobotrys =

Scientific classification
- Domain: Eukaryota
- Kingdom: Fungi
- Division: Ascomycota
- Class: Pezizomycetes
- Order: Pezizales
- Family: Pyronemataceae
- Genus: Micronematobotrys; Xiang Sun & L.D. Guo (2010)

Type species
- Micronematobotrys verrucosus Xiang Sun & L.D. Guo (2010)

Genus of fungi

Micronematobotrys is a monotypic genus of Pezizales in the family Pyronemataceae, first described in 2010. It contains the single species Micronematobotrys verrucosus. The type location is Dongling Mountain, near Beijing, China, where it was found growing on Quercus liaotungensis and Ulmus macrocarpa.
