= Miladina =

Scientific classification
- Kingdom: Fungi
- Division: Ascomycota
- Class: Pezizomycetes
- Order: Pezizales
- Family: Pyronemataceae
- Genus: Miladina; Svrček (1972)

Type species
- Miladina lecithina (Cooke) Svrček (as lechithina) (1972)

Genus of fungi

Miladina is a genus of fungi in the family Pyronemataceae. A monotypic genus, it contains the single species Miladina lecithina.
