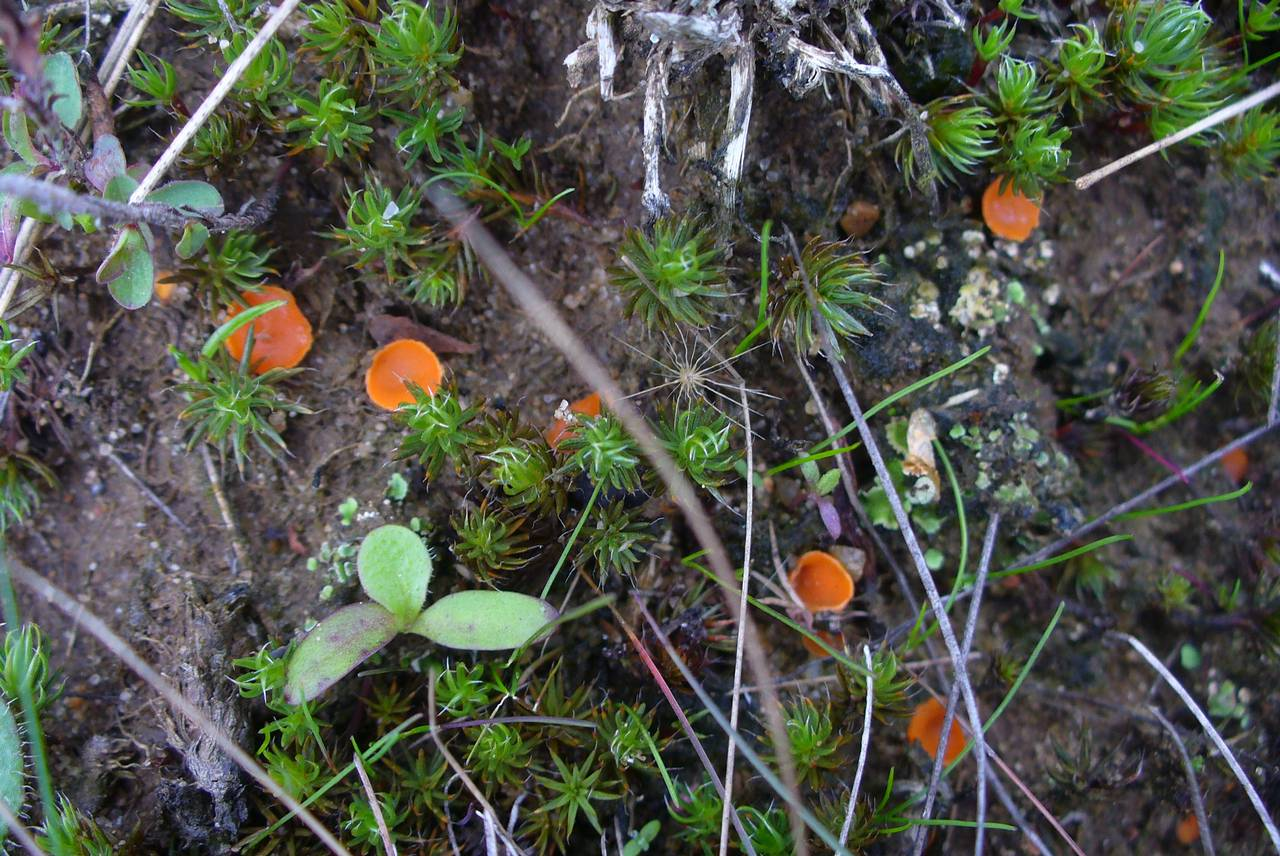
- Octospora humosa

Scientific classification
- Kingdom: Fungi
- Division: Ascomycota
- Class: Pezizomycetes
- Order: Pezizales
- Family: Pyronemataceae
- Genus: Octospora; Hedw. (1789)

Type species
- Octospora leucoloma Hedw. (1789)

Synonyms
- Humarina Seaver (1927); Leucoloma Fuckel (1870)

= Octospora =

Genus of fungi

Octospora is a genus of fungi in the family Pyronemataceae.

== Species ==
- Octospora axillaris
- Octospora carbonigena
- Octospora coccinea
- Octospora conidiophora
- Octospora convexula
- Octospora crosslandii
- Octospora humosa
- Octospora leucoloma
- Octospora melina
- Octospora musci-muralis
- Octospora neglecta
- Octospora roxheimii
- Octospora rubens
- Octospora rustica

== Common names ==
An annual competition is run in the UK to give common names to species that currently only have Latin nomenclature, in order to make them more familiar to non-specialists. The fungus Octospora humosa, which is orange and grows among moss, was given the name Hotlips in 2011, reflecting its bright colour and shape.
