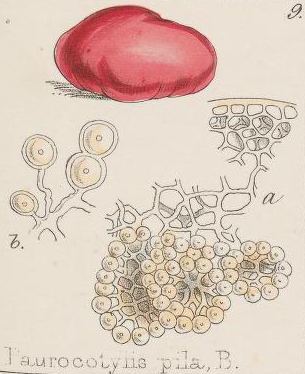

Scientific classification
- Domain: Eukaryota
- Kingdom: Fungi
- Division: Ascomycota
- Class: Pezizomycetes
- Order: Pezizales
- Family: Pyronemataceae
- Genus: Paurocotylis; Berk. ex Hook. f. (1855)

Type species
- Paurocotylis pila Berk. (1855)

= Paurocotylis =

Genus of fungi

Paurocotylis is a genus of fungi in the family Pyronemataceae. The genus contains multiple species, with the most well known being Paurocotylis pila, a truffle-like fungus found in Europe and New Zealand. It was described by Miles Joseph Berkeley in 1855. Species found in countries other than New Zealand include P. watlingii, P. singeri, P. prima, P. patagonica, P. niveus, P. echinosperma and P. bynumii.

Paurocotylis patagonica is a rare, little-known species in the genus. It is found in Patagonia.

== Selected species ==
- P. bynumii (USA)
- P. echinosperma
- P. niveus
- P. patagonica (Argentina, Chile)
- P. pila (New Zealand and Australia, introduced to UK)
- P. prima
- P. singeri (Argentina)
- P. watlingii (Australia)
