= Oviascoma =

Scientific classification
- Domain: Eukaryota
- Kingdom: Fungi
- Division: Ascomycota
- Class: Pezizomycetes
- Order: Pezizales
- Family: Pyronemataceae
- Genus: Oviascoma; Y.J. Yao & Spooner (1996)

Type species
- Oviascoma paludosum (Dennis) Y.J. Yao & Spooner (1996)

Genus of fungi

Oviascoma is a genus of fungi in the family Pyronemataceae.
