= Ascocalathium =

Scientific classification
- Domain: Eukaryota
- Kingdom: Fungi
- Division: Ascomycota
- Class: Pezizomycetes
- Order: Pezizales
- Family: Pyronemataceae
- Genus: Ascocalathium; Eidam ex J. Schröt. (1893)

Type species
- Ascocalathium stipitatum Eidam ex J. Schröt., in Cohn (1893)

Genus of fungi

Ascocalathium is a genus of fungi in the family Pyronemataceae. It is monotypic, containing the single species A. stipitatum.
