= Dictyocoprotus =

Scientific classification
- Domain: Eukaryota
- Kingdom: Fungi
- Division: Ascomycota
- Class: Pezizomycetes
- Order: Pezizales
- Family: Pyronemataceae
- Genus: Dictyocoprotus; J.C. Krug & R.S. Khan (1991)

Type species
- Dictyocoprotus mexicanus J.C. Krug & R.S. Khan (1991)

Genus of fungi

Dictyocoprotus is a genus of fungi in the family Pyronemataceae. It is monotypic, containing the single species D. mexicanus.
