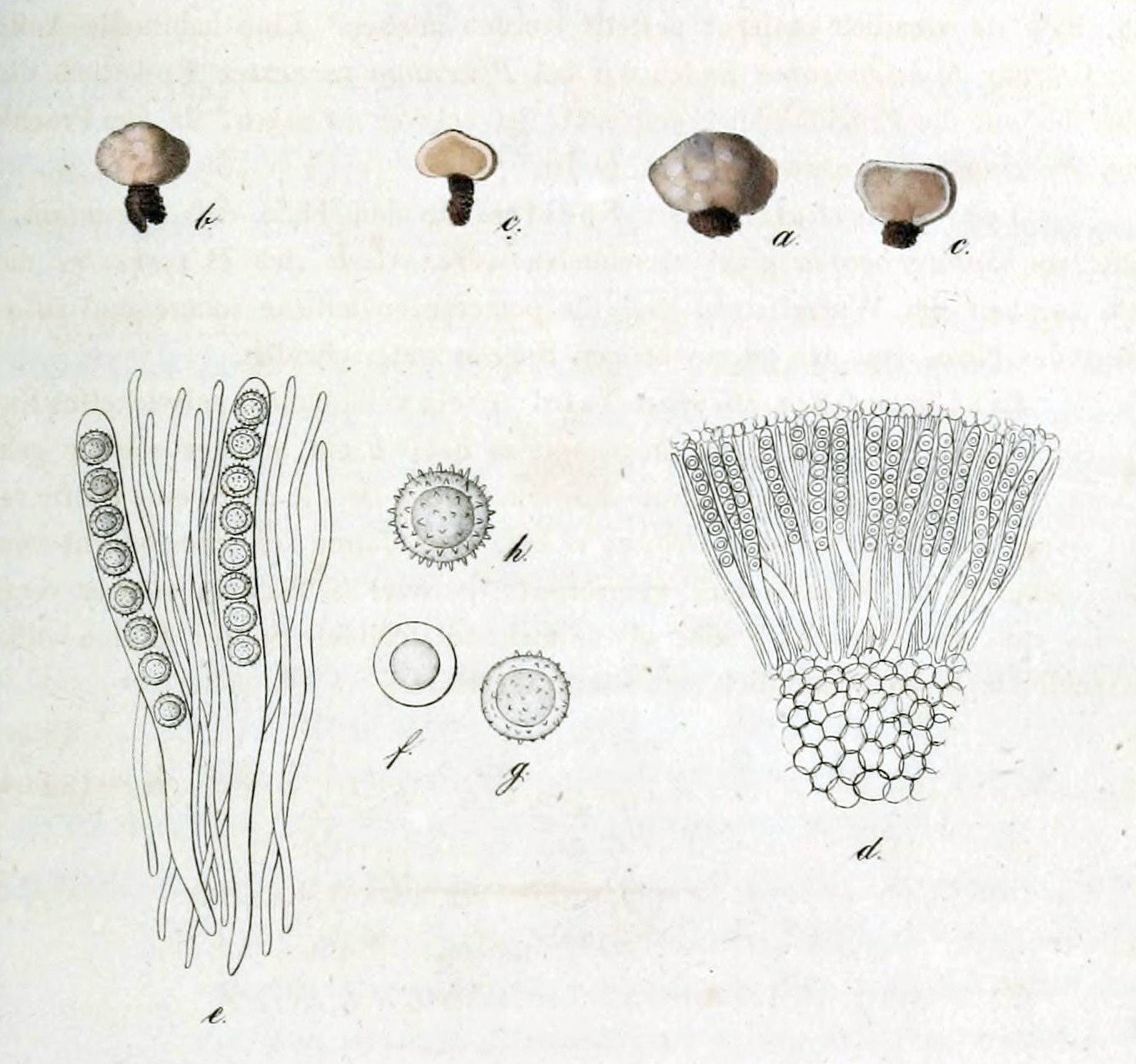
- Sphaerosoma fuscescens

Scientific classification
- Kingdom: Fungi
- Division: Ascomycota
- Class: Pezizomycetes
- Order: Pezizales
- Family: Pyronemataceae
- Genus: Sphaerosoma; Klotzsch (1839)

Type species
- Sphaerosoma fuscescens Klotzsch (1839)

Species
- Sphaerosoma echinulatum Sphaerosoma fuscescens Sphaerosoma hesperium

Synonyms
- Sphaerozosma Corda (1842)

= Sphaerosoma =

Genus of fungi

Sphaerosoma is a genus of fungi in the family Pyronemataceae. It contains three hypogeous (truffle-like) species that have been collected from Europe and North America.
