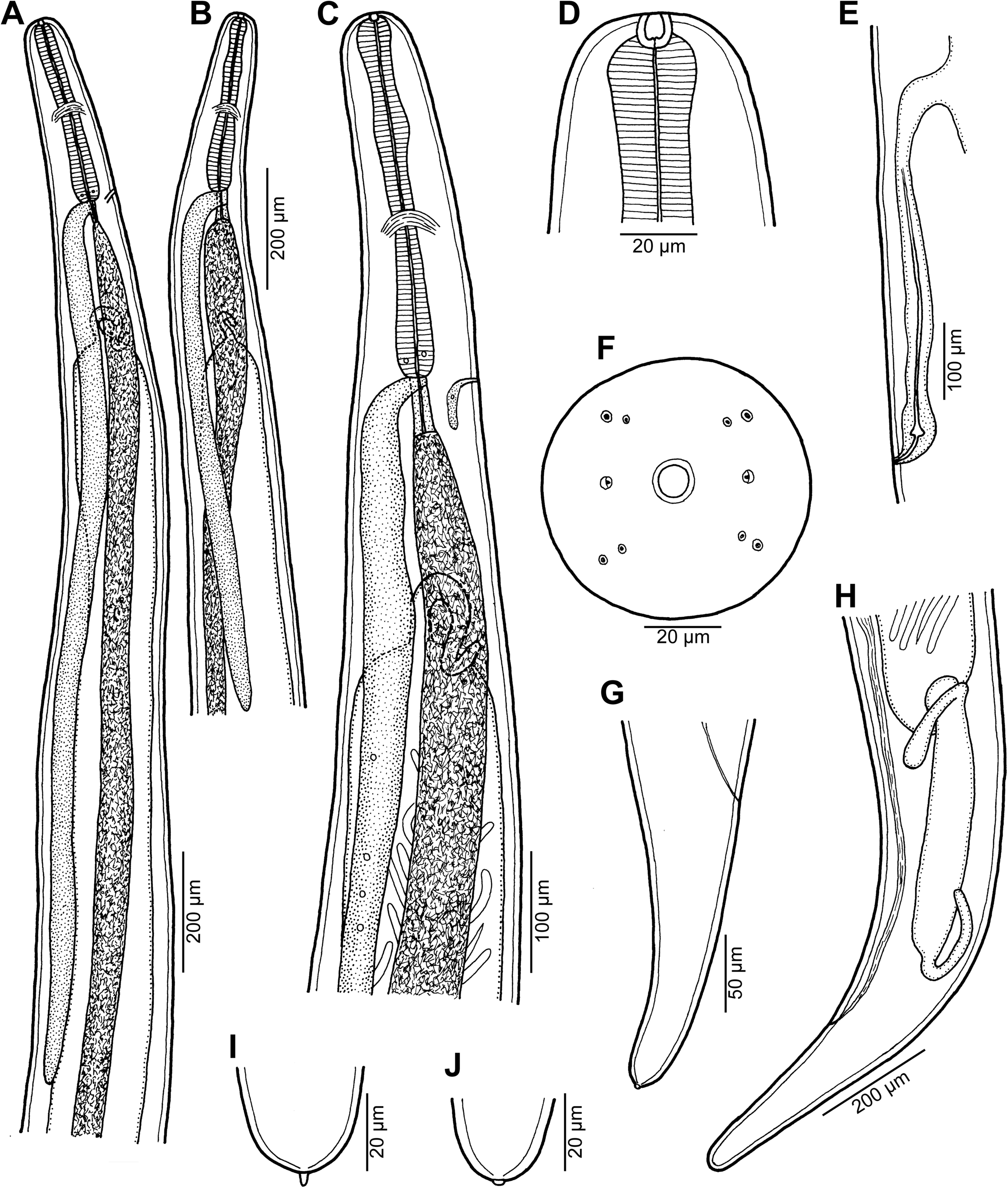
- Ichthyofilaroides novaecaledoniensis

Scientific classification
- Kingdom: Animalia
- Phylum: Nematoda
- Class: Chromadorea
- Order: Rhabditida
- Family: Guyanemidae
- Genus: Ichthyofilaroides; Moravec & Justine, 2020

= Ichthyofilaroides =

Genus of worms

Ichthyofilaroides is a genus of parasitic nematodes, belonging to the family Guyanemidae Petter, 1974.

Species of Ichthyofilaroides are parasitic as adults in fish, in the musculature, surface of visceral organs and body cavity. According to the World Register of Marine Species, the genus currently (2021) includes a single species, Ichthyofilaroides novaecaledoniensis (Moravec et Justine, 2009) Moravec & Justine, 2020. This species was originally described in 2009 as Ichthyofilaria novaecaledoniensis, then transferred to the genus Ichthyofilaroides in 2020 to become the type-species of the genus.

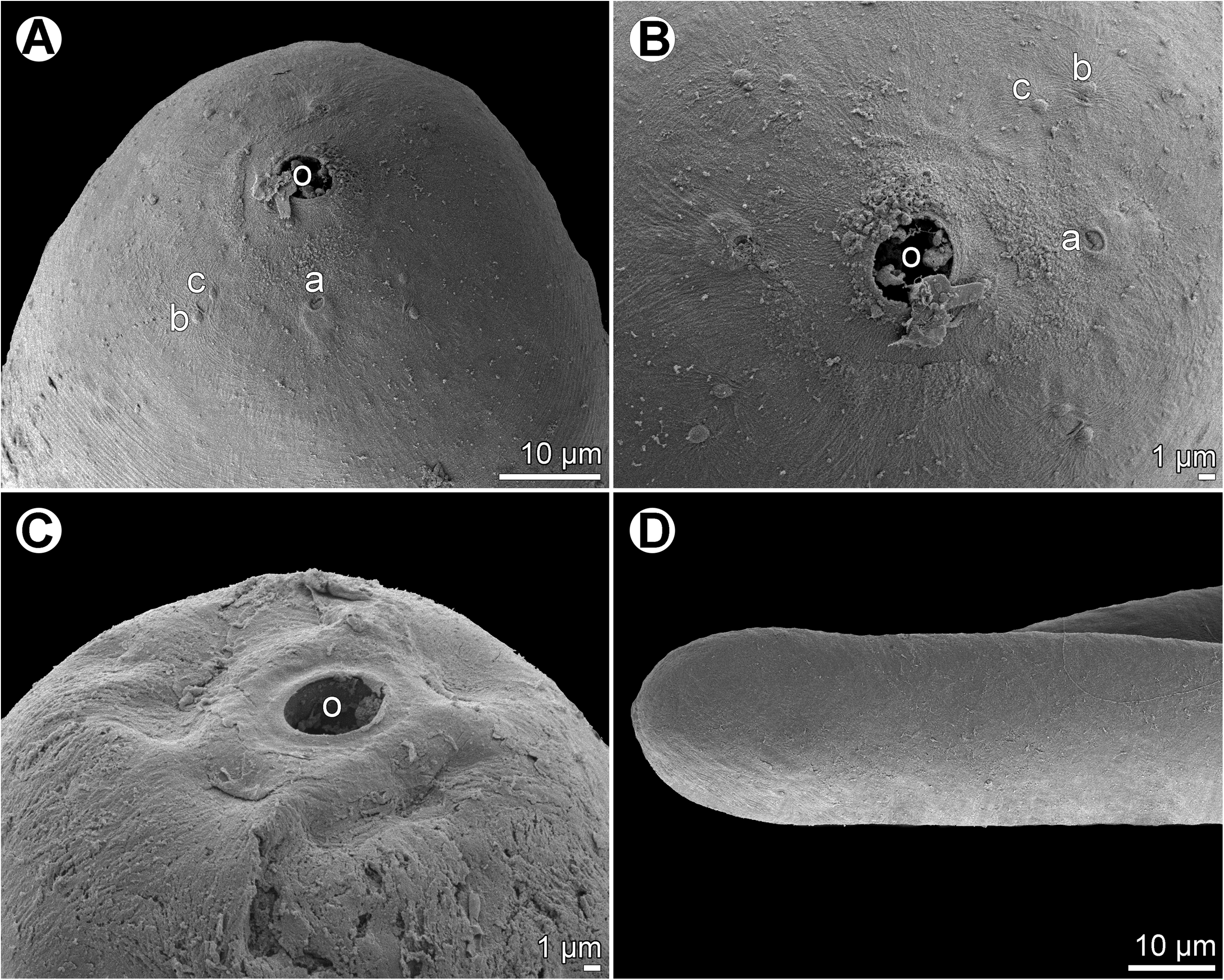
Scanning electron microscopy of Ichthyofilaroides novaecaledoniensis. A, B, C: head; D: tail

The new genus was differentiated from Ichthyofilaria mainly by the presence of the buccal capsule and the number and arrangement of the cephalic papillae. Moravec & Justine (2020) added that "since the buccal capsule has not yet been described in any species of the Guyanemidae, it may be necessary to create a new family for Ichthyofilaroides in the future. Nevertheless, since the male of its type species remains unknown, we provisionally assign Ichthyofilaroides to the family Guyanemidae, subfamily Travassosneminae."

== Hosts and localities ==
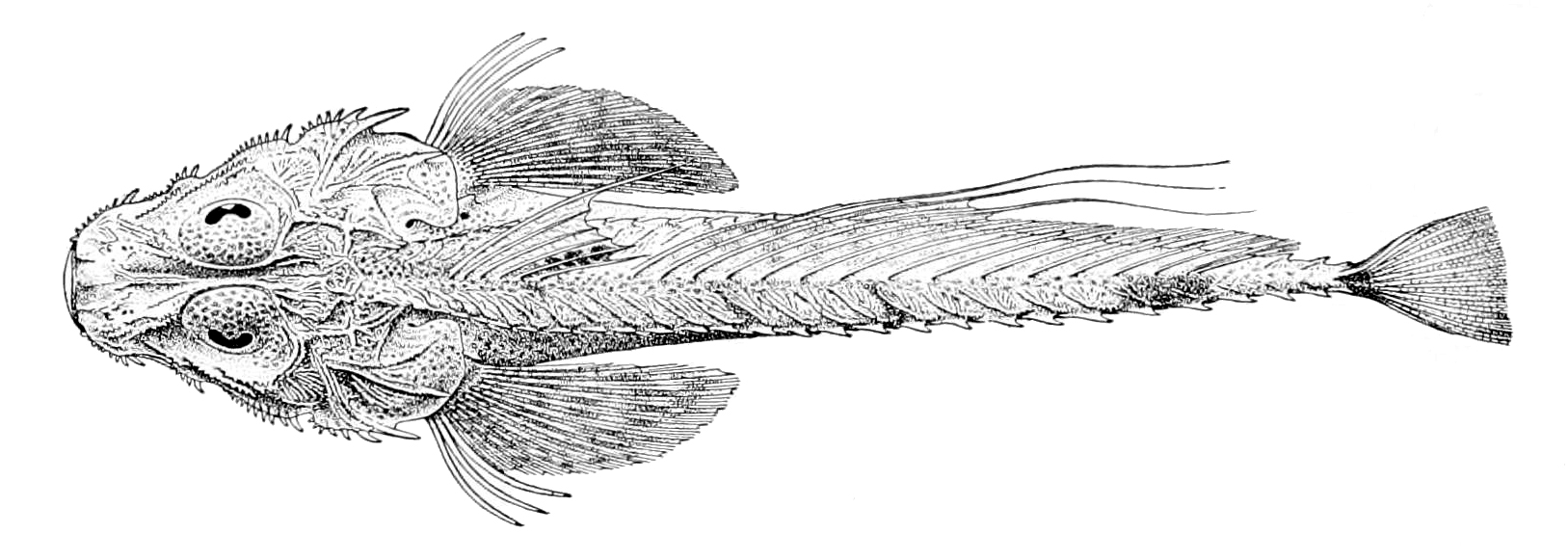
The host, Hoplichthys citrinus

Ichthyofilaroides novaecaledoniensis (Moravec et Justine, 2009) Moravec & Justine, 2020 is a parasite of a deep-sea fish, the Lemon ghost flathead Hoplichthys citrinus Gilbert (Hoplichthyidae, Scorpaeniformes), caught off New Caledonia.
