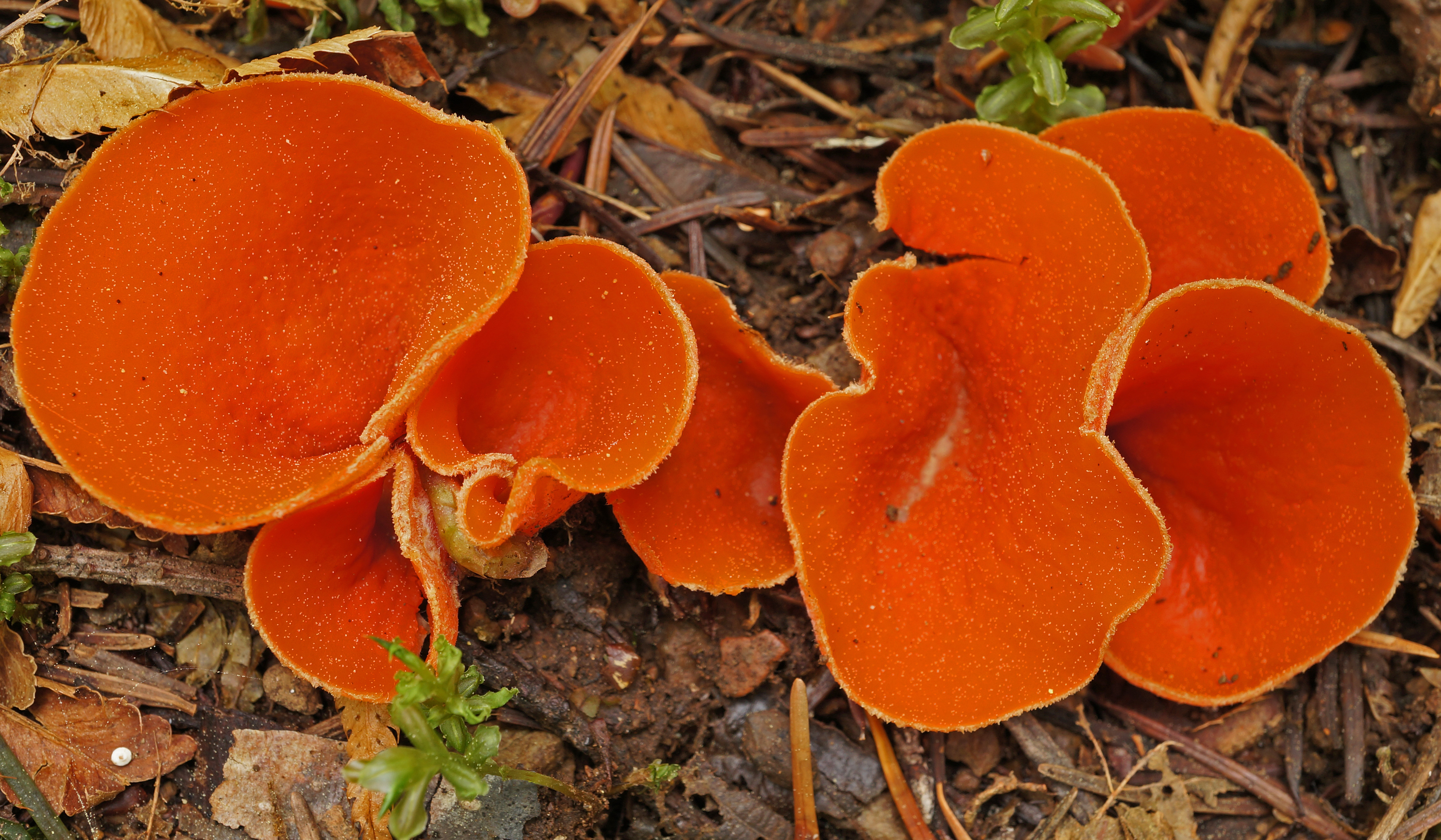
- Pseudaleuria quinaultiana

Scientific classification
- Domain: Eukaryota
- Kingdom: Fungi
- Division: Ascomycota
- Class: Pezizomycetes
- Order: Pezizales
- Family: Pyronemataceae
- Genus: Pseudaleuria; Lusk (1987)

Type species
- Pseudaleuria quinaultiana Lusk (1987)

Species
- Pseudaleuria fibrillosa Pseudaleuria quinaultiana

= Pseudaleuria =

Genus of fungi

Pseudaleuria is a genus of two species of fungi in the family Pyronemataceae. The genus was circumscribed by Demaris Lusk in 1987 to contain the type, P. quinaultiana, a species found in the Olympic Peninsula of North America. P. fibrillosa was transferred to the genus (from Cheilymenia) in 2003.

P. quinaultiana is similar in appearance to Aleuria aurantia (the orange peel fungus), but is shaped more like a saucer than a cup and usually occurs in pairs rather than groups.
