= Luciotrichus =

Scientific classification
- Domain: Eukaryota
- Kingdom: Fungi
- Division: Ascomycota
- Class: Pezizomycetes
- Order: Pezizales
- Family: Pyronemataceae
- Genus: Luciotrichus; R. Galán & Raitv. (1995)

Type species
- Luciotrichus lasioboloides R. Galán & Raitv. (1995)

Genus of fungi

Luciotrichus is a genus of fungi in the family Pyronemataceae. A monotypic genus, it contains the single species Luciotrichus lasioboloides.
