= Anixia nemoralis =

Scientific classification
- Domain: Eukaryota
- Kingdom: Fungi
- Division: Basidiomycota
- Class: Agaricomycetes
- Genus: Anixia
- Species: A. nemoralis

Binomial name
- Anixia nemoralis Fr. (1819)

Species of fungus

Anixia nemoralis is a species of fungus belonging to the Anixia genus. It was documented in 1819 by Swedish mycologist Elias Magnus Fries.
