= Anixia bresadolae =

Scientific classification
- Domain: Eukaryota
- Kingdom: Fungi
- Division: Basidiomycota
- Class: Agaricomycetes
- Genus: Anixia
- Species: A. bresadolae

Binomial name
- Anixia bresadolae Höhn. (1902)

Species of fungus

Anixia bresadolae is a species of fungus belonging to the Agaricomycetes class. It was described 1902 by Austrian mycologist Franz Xaver Rudolf von Höhnel. It occurs in Europe.
