= Galeoscypha =

Scientific classification
- Domain: Eukaryota
- Kingdom: Fungi
- Division: Ascomycota
- Class: Pezizomycetes
- Order: Pezizales
- Family: Pyronemataceae
- Genus: Galeoscypha; Svrček & J. Moravec (1989)

Type species
- Galeoscypha pileiformis (Svrček) Svrček & J. Moravec (1989)

Genus of fungi

Galeoscypha is a genus of fungi in the family Pyronemataceae. It is monotypic, containing the single species Galeoscypha pileiformis.
