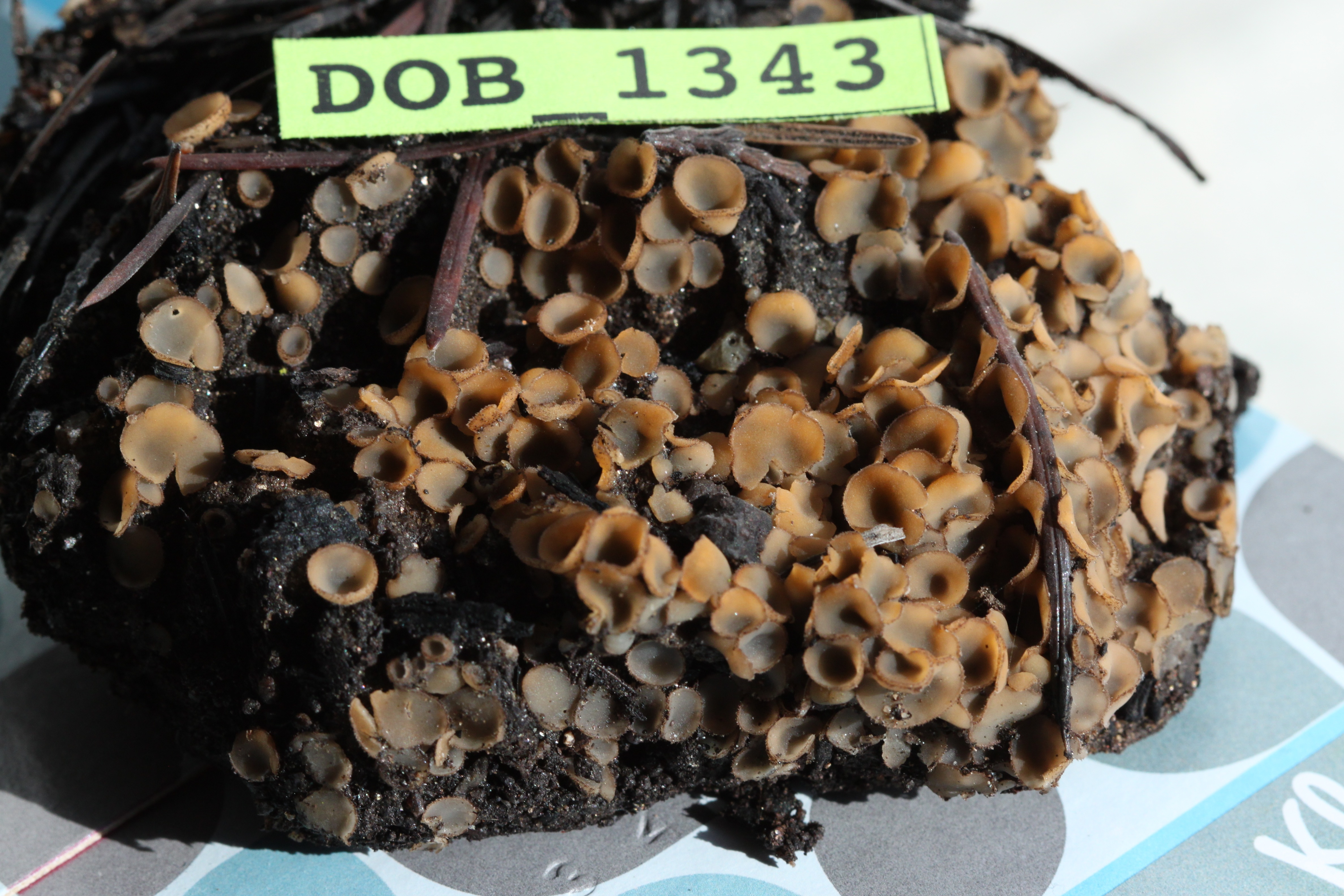
- Tricharina praecox

Scientific classification
- Domain: Eukaryota
- Kingdom: Fungi
- Division: Ascomycota
- Class: Pezizomycetes
- Order: Pezizales
- Family: Pyronemataceae
- Genus: Tricharina; Eckblad (1968)

Type species
- Tricharina gilva (Boud. ex Cooke) Eckblad (1968)

Synonyms
- Tricharia Boud. (1885)

= Tricharina =

Genus of fungi

Tricharina is a genus of fungi in the family Pyronemataceae. The genus has a widespread distribution in temperate regions, and contains 13 species. The anamorph form is Ascorhizoctonia. Tricharina was described by mycologist Finn-Egil Eckblad in 1968.

== Species ==
- T. ascophanoides
- T. cretea
- T. flava
- T. gilva
- T. groenlandica
- T. hiemalis
- T. japonica
- T. mariae
- T. ochroleuca
- T. pallidisetosa
- T. praecox
- T. striispora
- T. obispora
