= Lasiobolidium =

Scientific classification
- Domain: Eukaryota
- Kingdom: Fungi
- Division: Ascomycota
- Class: Pezizomycetes
- Order: Pezizales
- Family: Pyronemataceae
- Genus: Lasiobolidium; Malloch & Cain (1971)

Type species
- Lasiobolidium spirale Malloch & Cain (1971)

Species
- Lasiobolidium aegyptiacum Lasiobolidium fallax Lasiobolidium gracile Lasiobolidium helicoideum Lasiobolidium orbiculoides Lasiobolidium recurvatum Lasiobolidium spirale

Genus of fungi

Lasiobolidium is a genus of fungi in the family Pyronemataceae.
