= Pulvinula cinnabarina =

Scientific classification
- Domain: Eukaryota
- Kingdom: Fungi
- Division: Ascomycota
- Class: Pezizomycetes
- Order: Pezizales
- Family: Pyronemataceae
- Genus: Pulvinula
- Species: P. cinnabarina

Binomial name
- Pulvinula cinnabarina Fuckel, 1874

Species of fungus

Pulvinula cinnabarina is a species of apothecial fungus belonging to the family Pyronemataceae. This is a European fungus of sandy soils, sometimes occurring at fire sites. The small (up to 1 cm across) orange, cushion-shaped ascocarps appear in summer and early autumn.
