= Boudierella =

Scientific classification
- Domain: Eukaryota
- Kingdom: Fungi
- Division: Ascomycota
- Class: Pezizomycetes
- Order: Pezizales
- Family: Pyronemataceae
- Genus: Boudierella; Sacc. (1895)

Type species
- Boudierella coronata Costantin (1897)

Species
- Boudierella cana

Genus of fungi

Boudierella is a genus of fungi in the family Pyronemataceae.

The name Boudierella honours Jean Louis Émile Boudier (1828–1920), a pharmacist who lived in Montmorency, France.

It was circumscribed in 1897.
