= Paratrichophaea =

Scientific classification
- Domain: Eukaryota
- Kingdom: Fungi
- Division: Ascomycota
- Class: Pezizomycetes
- Order: Pezizales
- Family: Pyronemataceae
- Genus: Paratrichophaea; Trigaux (1985)

Type species
- Paratrichophaea macrocystis Trigaux (1985)

Genus of fungi

Paratrichophaea is a genus of fungi in the family Pyronemataceae.
