= Hypotarzetta =

Scientific classification
- Kingdom: Fungi
- Division: Ascomycota
- Class: Pezizomycetes
- Order: Pezizales
- Family: Pyronemataceae
- Genus: Hypotarzetta; Donadini (1985)

Type species
- Hypotarzetta insignis (Berthet & Riousset) Donadini (1985)

Genus of fungi

Hypotarzetta is a genus of fungi in the family Pyronemataceae. It is monotypic, containing the single species Hypotarzetta insignis.
