= Hiemsia =

Scientific classification
- Domain: Eukaryota
- Kingdom: Fungi
- Division: Ascomycota
- Class: Pezizomycetes
- Order: Pezizales
- Family: Pyronemataceae
- Genus: Hiemsia; Svrček (1969)

Type species
- Hiemsia pseudoampezzana (Svrček) Svrček (1969)

Species
- Hiemsia cleistocarpa Hiemsia pseudoampezzana

Genus of fungi

Hiemsia is a genus of fungi in the family Pyronemataceae.
