= Petchiomyces =

Scientific classification
- Domain: Eukaryota
- Kingdom: Fungi
- Division: Ascomycota
- Class: Pezizomycetes
- Order: Pezizales
- Family: Pyronemataceae
- Genus: Petchiomyces; E. Fisch. & Mattir. (1938)

Type species
- Petchiomyces thwaitesii (Berk. & Broome) E. Fisch. & Mattir., in Engler & Prantl (1938)

Genus of fungi

Petchiomyces is a genus of fungi in the family Pyronemataceae.
