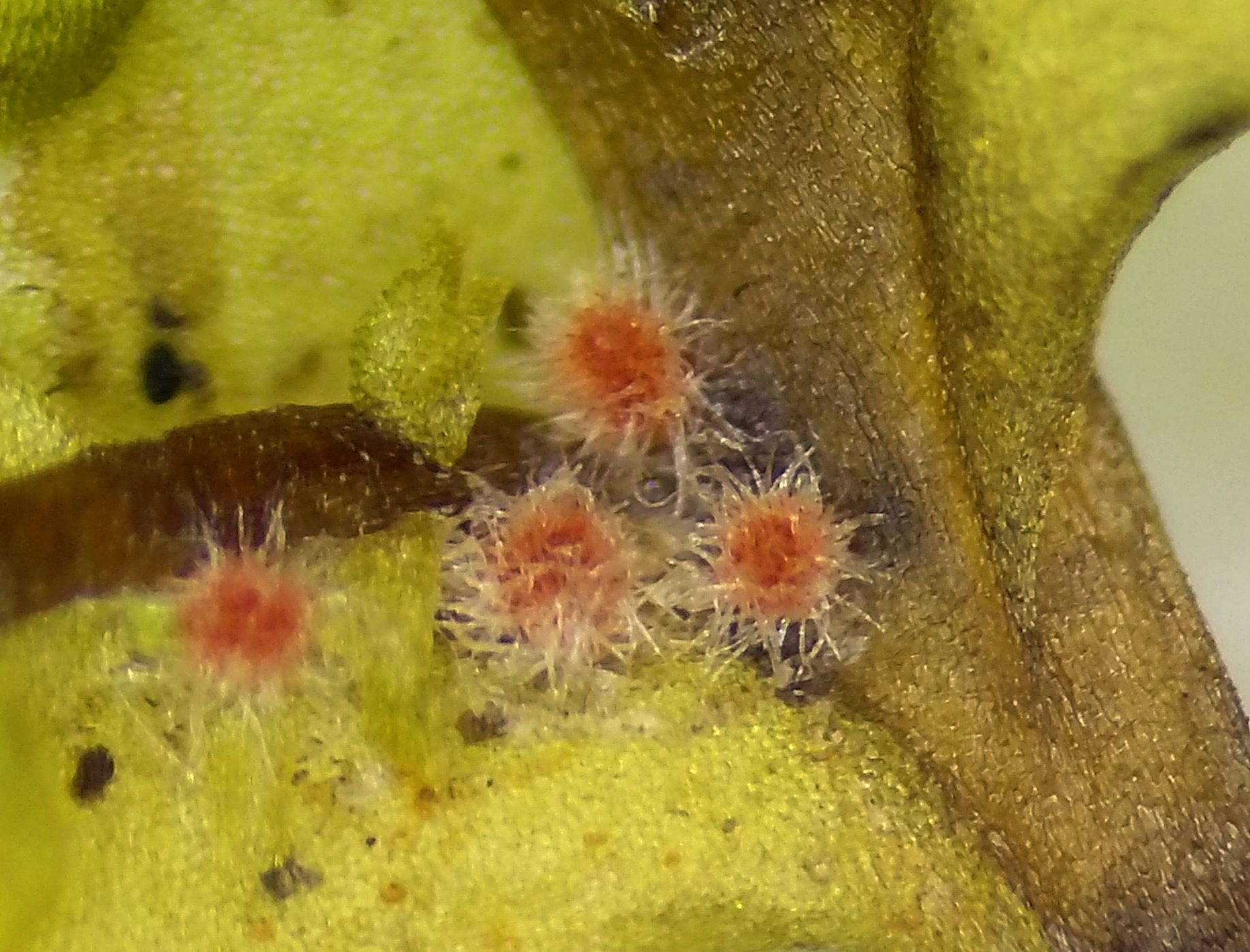
- Octosporella jungermanniarum

Scientific classification
- Kingdom: Fungi
- Division: Ascomycota
- Class: Pezizomycetes
- Order: Pezizales
- Family: Pyronemataceae
- Genus: Octosporella; Döbbeler (1980)

Type species
- Octosporella jungermanniarum (P. Crouan & H. Crouan) Döbbeler (1980)

= Octosporella =

Genus of fungi

Octosporella is a genus of fungi in the family Pyronemataceae.
