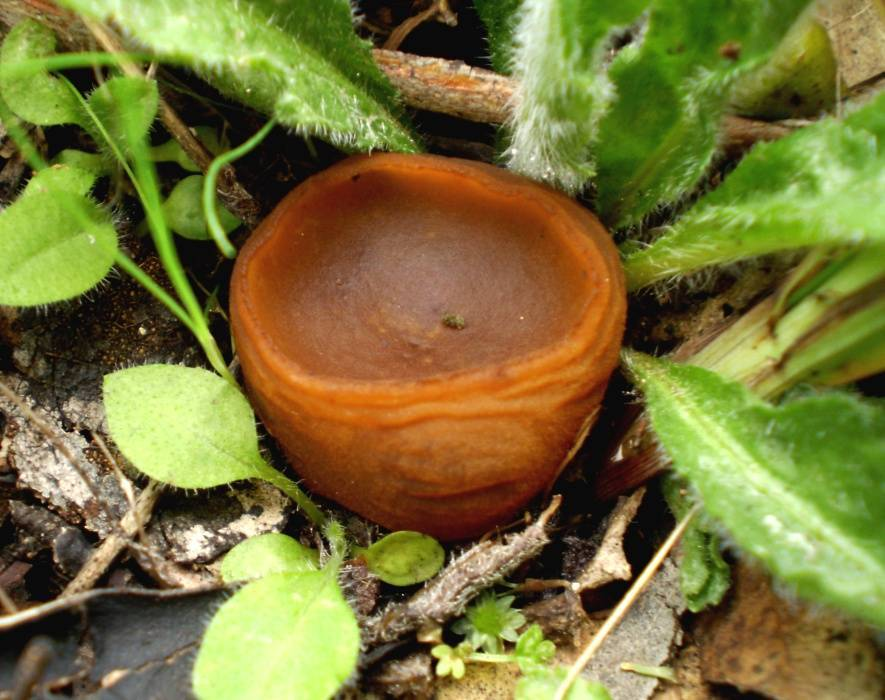
- Aleurina ferruginea

Scientific classification
- Domain: Eukaryota
- Kingdom: Fungi
- Division: Ascomycota
- Class: Pezizomycetes
- Order: Pezizales
- Family: Pyronemataceae
- Genus: Aleurina; Massee (1898)

Type species
- Aleurina tasmanica Massee (1898)

Synonyms
- Jafneadelphus Rifai (1968)

= Aleurina =

Genus of fungi

Aleurina is a genus of fungi in the family Pyronemataceae. The genus, which was circumscribed by George Edward Massee in 1898, is synonymous with Jafneadelphus as defined by Mien A. Rifai in 1968. Aleurina is widely distributed and contains 11 species.

== Species ==
- A. americana
- A. argentina
- A. asperula
- A. calospora
- A. echinata
- A. ferruginea
- A. imaii
- A. magnicellula
- A. olivaceofusca
- A. subvirescens
