= Anixia interrupta =

Scientific classification
- Domain: Eukaryota
- Kingdom: Fungi
- Division: Basidiomycota
- Class: Agaricomycetes
- Genus: Anixia
- Species: A. interrupta

Binomial name
- Anixia interrupta Schwein (1832)

Species of fungus

Anixia interrupta is a species of fungus belonging to the genus Anixia. It was documented in 1832 by German-American mycologist Lewis David de Schweinitz.
