= Anixia atrospora =

Scientific classification
- Domain: Eukaryota
- Kingdom: Fungi
- Division: Basidiomycota
- Class: Agaricomycetes
- Genus: Anixia
- Species: A. atrospora

Binomial name
- Anixia atrospora Pat. (1927)

Species of fungus

Anixia atrospora is a species of fungus belonging to the Anixia genus. It was discovered 1927 by French mycologist Narcisse Théophile Patouillard.
