= Anixia myriasca =

Scientific classification
- Domain: Eukaryota
- Kingdom: Fungi
- Division: Basidiomycota
- Class: Agaricomycetes
- Genus: Anixia
- Species: A. myriasca

Binomial name
- Anixia myriasca Höhnel (1902)

Species of fungus

Anixia myriasca is a species of fungus that belongs to the Anixia genus. It was documented in 1902 by Austrian mycologist Franz Xaver Rudolf von Höhnel.
