= Anixia wallrothii =

Scientific classification
- Domain: Eukaryota
- Kingdom: Fungi
- Division: Basidiomycota
- Class: Agaricomycetes
- Genus: Anixia
- Species: A. wallrothii

Binomial name
- Anixia wallrothii Fuckel (1870)

Species of fungus

Anixia wallrothii is a species of fungus belonging to the Anixia genus. It was documented in 1870 by German mycologist Karl Wilhelm Gottlieb Leopold Fuckel. The Anixia is a part of a larger fungal family known for their diverse habitats and role in ecosystem.
