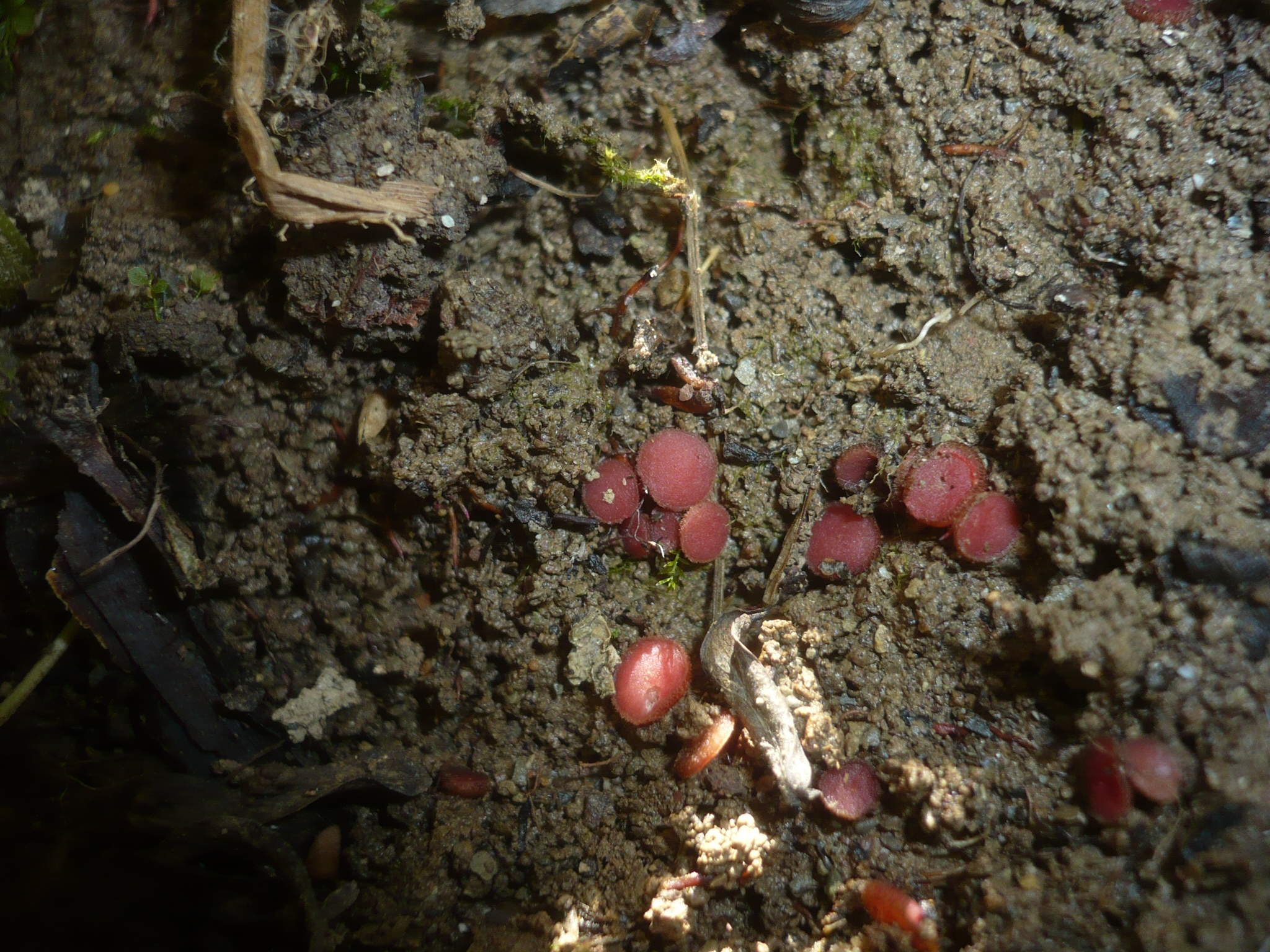
- Parascutellinia violacea in Bosnia and Herzegovina

Scientific classification
- Kingdom: Fungi
- Division: Ascomycota
- Class: Pezizomycetes
- Order: Pezizales
- Family: Pyronemataceae
- Genus: Parascutellinia; Svrček (1975)

Type species
- Parascutellinia violacea (Velen.) Svrček (1975)

Species
- P. arctespora P. carneosanguinea P. fuckelii P. iuliana P. violacea

= Parascutellinia =

Genus of fungi

Parascutellinia is a genus of fungi in the family Pyronemataceae. It was circumscribed by mycologist Mirko Svrček in 1975, with P. violacea as the type species.
