= Stephensia (fungus) =

Scientific classification
- Kingdom: Fungi
- Division: Ascomycota
- Class: Pezizomycetes
- Order: Pezizales
- Family: Pyronemataceae
- Genus: Stephensia Tul. & C.Tul. (1845)

Type species
- Stephensia bombycina (Vittad.) Tul. (1851)

Genus of fungi

Stephensia is a genus of fungi in the family Pyronemataceae. It is treated by some as a synonym of Hydnocystis, with the type species, S. bombycina, being transferred to Hydnocystis.
