= Anixia berkeleyi =

Scientific classification
- Domain: Eukaryota
- Kingdom: Fungi
- Division: Basidiomycota
- Class: Agaricomycetes
- Genus: Anixia
- Species: A. berkeleyi

Binomial name
- Anixia berkeleyi Naumov (1927)

Species of fungus

Anixia berkeleyi is a species of fungus belonging to the Anixia genus. It was discovered 1927 by Russian mycologist Nikolai Aleksandrovich Naumov.
