= Hydnocystis =

Scientific classification
- Domain: Eukaryota
- Kingdom: Fungi
- Division: Ascomycota
- Class: Pezizomycetes
- Order: Pezizales
- Family: Pyronemataceae
- Genus: Hydnocystis; Tul. (1844)

Type species
- Hydnocystis arenaria Tul. & C.Tul. (1844)

Species
- H. arenaria H. beccarii H. californica H. clausa H. convoluta H. echinospora H. japonica H. piligera H. singeri H. transitoria

Genus of fungi

Hydnocystis is a genus of truffle-like fungi in the family Pyronemataceae. A number of species in this genus have been transferred to other genera, and as of 2017, only two are undisputedly a part of this genus, H. piligera and H. japonica. Stephensia is treated by some as a synonym of this genus.
