= Anixia minuta =

Scientific classification
- Domain: Eukaryota
- Kingdom: Fungi
- Division: Basidiomycota
- Class: Agaricomycetes
- Genus: Anixia
- Species: A. minuta

Binomial name
- Anixia minuta Schulzer (1872)

Species of fungus

Anixia minuta is a species of fungus belonging to the Anixia genus. It was documented in 1872 by Hungarian-Croatian mycologist Stephan Schulzer von Müggenburg.
