= Chalazion (fungus) =

Scientific classification
- Domain: Eukaryota
- Kingdom: Fungi
- Division: Ascomycota
- Class: Pezizomycetes
- Order: Pezizales
- Family: Pyronemataceae
- Genus: Chalazion; Dissing & Sivertsen (1975)

Type species
- Chalazion sociabile Dissing & Sivertsen (1975)

Species
- Chalazion erinaceum Chalazion helveticum Chalazion sociabile

Genus of fungi

Chalazion is a genus of fungi in the family Pyronemataceae.
