= Jafnea =

Scientific classification
- Domain: Eukaryota
- Kingdom: Fungi
- Division: Ascomycota
- Class: Pezizomycetes
- Order: Pezizales
- Family: Pyronemataceae
- Genus: Jafnea; Korf (1960)

Type species
- Jafnea fusicarpa (W.R.Gerard) Korf (1960)

Species
- Jafnea fusicarpa Jafnia imaii Jafnea semitosta

Genus of fungi

Jafnea is a genus of fungi in the family Pyronemataceae. It was circumscribed by mycologist Richard P. Korf in 1960.

The genus name of Jafnea is in honour of Johan Axel Frithiof Nannfeldt (1904–1985), who was a Swedish botanist and mycologist.
