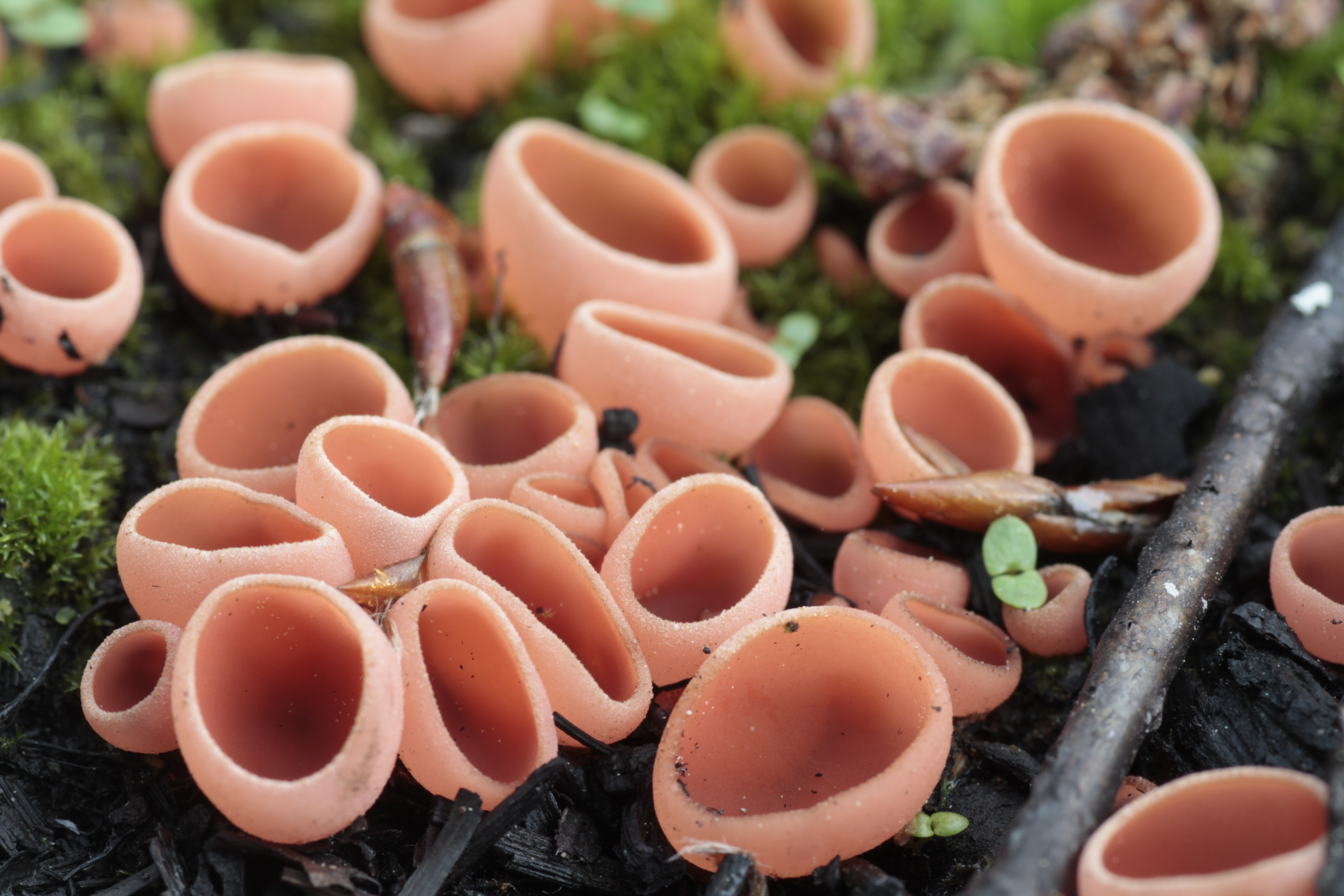

Scientific classification
- Domain: Eukaryota
- Kingdom: Fungi
- Division: Ascomycota
- Class: Pezizomycetes
- Order: Pezizales
- Family: Pyronemataceae
- Genus: Pyropyxis; Egger (1984)

Type species
- Pyropyxis rubra (Peck) Egger (1984)

Synonyms
- Peziza rubra Peck (1872)

= Pyropyxis =

Genus of fungi

Pyropyxis is a genus of fungi in the family Pyronemataceae. It was circumscribed in 1984 by Keith Egger, to contain the single species Pyropyxis rubra. This species was originally described by Charles Horton Peck in 1872 as a species of Peziza. The genus name, said to be derived from the Greek word for "fire" (pyros) and the Latin word pyxis, refers to the segregation of this species from the genus Geopyxis. The proper word in ancient Greek for "fire" is however pyr (πῦρ).

Fruit bodies of the fungus are cup shaped, with a pink to reddish-orange color. Pyropyxis rubra has a Dichobotrys anamorph. The species is found in North America, where it grows as a saprophyte on burned forest litter in both mixed and deciduous forests.
