= Ascosparassis =

Scientific classification
- Domain: Eukaryota
- Kingdom: Fungi
- Division: Ascomycota
- Class: Pezizomycetes
- Order: Pezizales
- Family: Pyronemataceae
- Genus: Ascosparassis; Kobayasi (1960)

Type species
- Ascosparassis shimizuensis Kobayasi (1960)

Species
- Ascosparassis heinricheri Ascosparassis shimizuensis

Genus of fungi

Ascosparassis is a genus of fungi in the family Pyronemataceae.
