= Aparaphysaria =

Scientific classification
- Domain: Eukaryota
- Kingdom: Fungi
- Division: Ascomycota
- Class: Pezizomycetes
- Order: Pezizales
- Family: Pyronemataceae
- Genus: Aparaphysaria; Speg. (1922)

Type species
- Aparaphysaria doelloi Speg. (1922)

Species
- Aparaphysaria aparaphysata Aparaphysaria doelloi

Genus of fungi

Aparaphysaria is a genus of fungi in the family Pyronemataceae.
