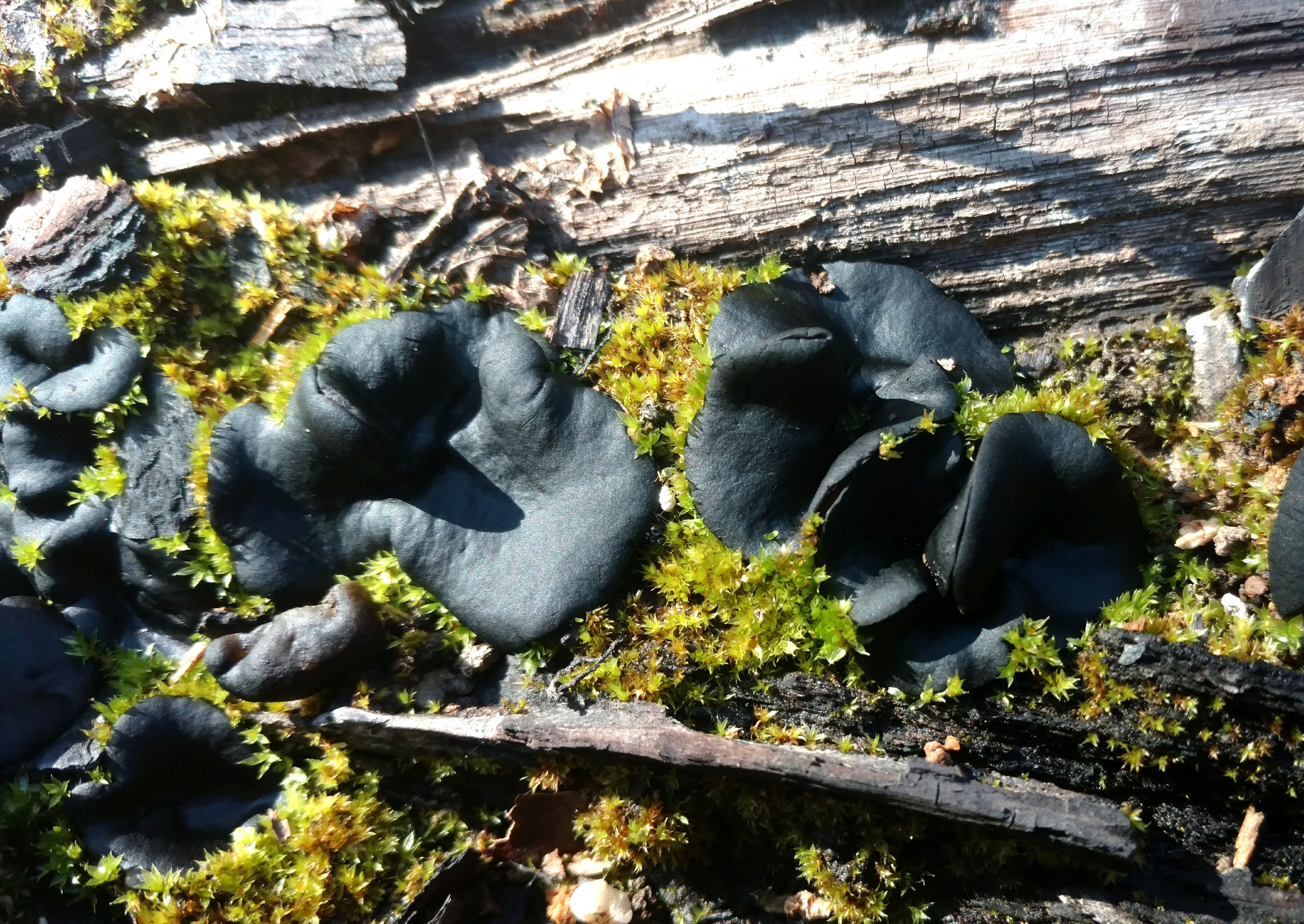

Scientific classification
- Kingdom: Fungi
- Division: Ascomycota
- Class: Pezizomycetes
- Order: Pezizales
- Family: Pezizaceae
- Genus: Plicaria
- Species: P. carbonaria

Binomial name
- Plicaria carbonaria Fuckel

= Plicaria carbonaria =

Species of fungus

Plicaria carbonaria is a species of apothecial fungus belonging to the family Pezizaceae. This is a common European fungus of burnt ground, appearing from spring to autumn as dark brown to black cups up to 3 cm in diameter.
