= Mycogalopsis =

Scientific classification
- Domain: Eukaryota
- Kingdom: Fungi
- Division: Ascomycota
- Class: Pezizomycetes
- Order: Pezizales
- Family: Pyronemataceae
- Genus: Mycogalopsis; Gjurašin (1925)

Type species
- Mycogalopsis retinospora Gjurašin (1925)

Genus of fungi

Mycogalopsis is a genus of fungi in the family Pyronemataceae.
