= Orbicula parietina =

Scientific classification
- Kingdom: Fungi
- Division: Ascomycota
- Class: Pezizomycetes
- Order: Pezizales
- Family: Pseudombrophilaceae
- Genus: Orbicula
- Species: O. parietina

Binomial name
- Orbicula parietina (Schrad.) S.Hughes (1951)

Synonyms
- Anixia cyclospora (Cooke) Sacc. (1882); Anixia parietina (Schrader) Lindau (1897); Anixia spadicea Fuckel (1870); Anixia truncigena Hoffm. (1863); Chaetomiotricha glabra Peyronel (1914); Chaetomiotricha glabrum Bainier (1909); Chaetomiotricha glabrum Berk. (1860); Didymium parietinum Schrad. (1797); Licea bicolor Pers. (1801); Lycogala parietinum (Schrad.) Fr. (1829); Mycogala parietinum (Schrad.) Sacc. (1884); Orbicula cyclospora (Cooke) Cooke (1871); Sphaeria cyclospora Cooke (1871)

Species of fungus

Orbicula parietina is a species of fungus belonging to the Orbicula genus. It was given its current name in 1951 by Canadian mycologist Stanley Hughes. Originally, it was documented under the name Didymium parietinum in 1797 by German mycologist Heinrich Schrader (botanist).
