= Rhizoblepharia =

Scientific classification
- Domain: Eukaryota
- Kingdom: Fungi
- Division: Ascomycota
- Class: Pezizomycetes
- Order: Pezizales
- Family: Pyronemataceae
- Genus: Rhizoblepharia; Rifai (1968)

Type species
- Rhizoblepharia jugispora Rifai (1968)

Genus of fungi

Rhizoblepharia is a genus of fungi in the family Pyronemataceae.
