= Boubovia =

Scientific classification
- Domain: Eukaryota
- Kingdom: Fungi
- Division: Ascomycota
- Class: Pezizomycetes
- Order: Pezizales
- Family: Pyronemataceae
- Genus: Boubovia; Svrček (1977)

Type species
- Boubovia luteola (Velen.) Svrček (1977)

Species
- Boubovia ascoboloides Boubovia luteola Boubovia nicholsonii Boubovia subprolata Boubovia vermiphila

Genus of fungi

Boubovia is a genus of fungi in the family Pyronemataceae.
