= Anixia =

Scientific classification
- Kingdom: Fungi
- Division: Basidiomycota
- Class: Agaricomycetes
- Subclass: Agaricomycetidae
- Genus: Anixia; Fr. (1819)

Type species
- Anixia nemoralis Fr. (1819)

Species
- A. atrosprora; A. berkeleyi; A. bresadolae; A. buxi; A. glabra; A. interrupta; A. minuta; A. myriasca; A. nemoralis; A. truncigena; A. villosa; A. wallrothii

Genus of fungi

Anixia is a genus of fungi that belongs to the Agaricomycetes class; it is not assigned to an order or a family. The Anixia genus consists of twelve fungi species. The genus was first documented in 1819 by Swedish mycologist Elias Magnus Fries.
