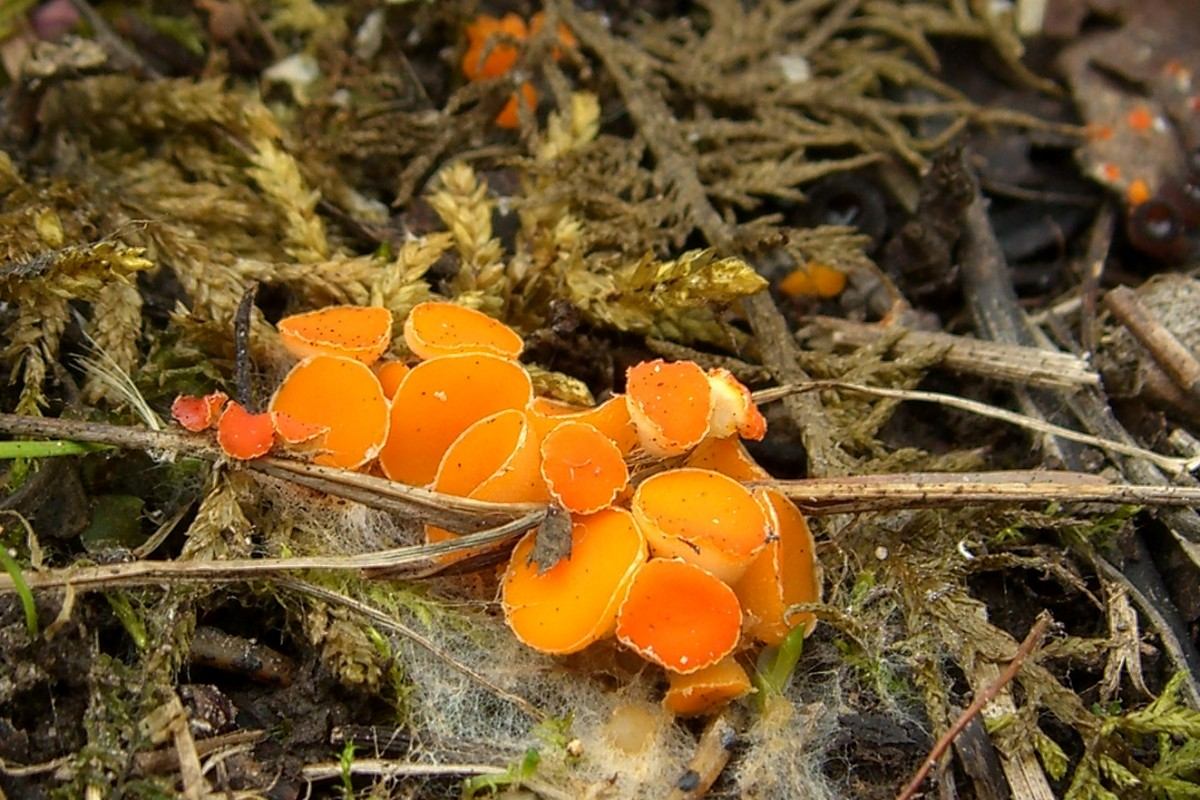
- Byssonectria fusispora

Scientific classification
- Domain: Eukaryota
- Kingdom: Fungi
- Division: Ascomycota
- Class: Pezizomycetes
- Order: Pezizales
- Family: Pyronemataceae
- Genus: Byssonectria; P.Karst (1881)

Type species
- Byssonectria obducens P.Karst. (1881)

Species
- see text

Synonyms
- Pseudocollema Kanouse & A.H.Sm. (1940); Discomycetella Sanwal (1953); Inermisia Rifai (1968)

= Byssonectria =

Genus of fungi

Byssonectria is a genus of fungi in the family Pyronemataceae.

== Species ==
- Byssonectria aggregata
- Byssonectria balansae
- Byssonectria buchsii
- Byssonectria cartilaginea
- Byssonectria chrysocoma
- Byssonectria cupulata
- Byssonectria delicatula
- Byssonectria dichotoma
- Byssonectria fimeti
- Byssonectria fusispora
- Byssonectria globifila
- Byssonectria miliaria
- Byssonectria obducens
- Byssonectria rosella
- Byssonectria seaveri
- Byssonectria tetraspora
- Byssonectria thuemenii
