= Arpinia =

Scientific classification
- Kingdom: Fungi
- Division: Ascomycota
- Class: Pezizomycetes
- Order: Pezizales
- Family: Pyronemataceae
- Genus: Arpinia; Berthet (1974)

Type species
- Arpinia inops Berthet (1974)

Species
- Arpinia fusispora Arpinia inops Arpinia luteola Arpinia microspora

Genus of fungi

Arpinia is a genus of fungi in the family Pyronemataceae.
