= Eoaleurina =

Scientific classification
- Domain: Eukaryota
- Kingdom: Fungi
- Division: Ascomycota
- Class: Pezizomycetes
- Order: Pezizales
- Family: Pyronemataceae
- Genus: Eoaleurina; Korf & W.Y.Zhuang (1986)

Type species
- Eoaleurina foliicola (Henn.) Korf & W.Y.Zhuang (1986)

Synonyms
- Humaria foliicola Henn. (1902); Jafneadelphus foliicolus (Henn.) Spooner (1981)

Genus of fungi

Eoaleurina is a fungal genus in the family Pyronemataceae. It is monotypic, containing the single species Eoaleurina foliicola, first described as Humaria foliicola by Paul Christoph Hennings in 1902. The genus was circumscribed by mycologists Richard Korf and Wenying Zhuang in 1986.
