= Genabea =

Scientific classification
- Domain: Eukaryota
- Kingdom: Fungi
- Division: Ascomycota
- Class: Pezizomycetes
- Order: Pezizales
- Family: Pyronemataceae
- Genus: Genabea; Tul. & C.Tul (1845)

Type species
- Genabea fragilis Tul. & C.Tul. (1845)

Genus of fungi

Genabea is a genus of fungus in the family Pyronemataceae. The genus contains five species, and the type species is Genabea fragilis, a mycorrhizal truffle-like fungus found in Europe and North America.
