= Lazuardia =

Scientific classification
- Domain: Eukaryota
- Kingdom: Fungi
- Division: Ascomycota
- Class: Pezizomycetes
- Order: Pezizales
- Family: Pyronemataceae
- Genus: Lazuardia; Rifai (1988)

Type species
- Lazuardia lobata (Berk. & M.A.Curtis) Rifai (1988)

Synonyms
- Peziza lobata Berk. & M.A.Curtis (1868); Barlaea lobata (Berk. & M.A.Curtis) Sacc. (1889); Barlaeina lobata (Berk. & M.A.Curtis) Sacc. & Traverso (1910); Lamprospora lobata (Berk. & M.A.Curtis) Seaver (1914)

Genus of fungi

Lazuardia is a monotypic genus of cup fungi in the family Pyronemataceae. The type species, Lazuardia lobata, grows on the ground in Ceylon, India, Java, Sumatra, Cuba, Jamaica and Trinidad. Ascospores are spherical and have dimensions of 8.4–11.4 μm.
