= Trichophaeopsis =

Scientific classification
- Kingdom: Fungi
- Division: Ascomycota
- Class: Pezizomycetes
- Order: Pezizales
- Family: Pyronemataceae
- Genus: Trichophaeopsis; Korf & Erb (1972)

Type species
- Trichophaeopsis bicuspis (Boud.) Korf & Erb (1972)

Species
- Trichophaeopsis bicuspis Trichophaeopsis latispora Trichophaeopsis paludosa Trichophaeopsis tetraspora

Genus of fungi

Trichophaeopsis is a genus of fungi in the family Pyronemataceae.
