= Orbicula =

Scientific classification
- Domain: Eukaryota
- Kingdom: Fungi
- Division: Ascomycota
- Class: Pezizomycetes
- Order: Pezizales
- Family: Pseudombrophilaceae
- Genus: Orbicula; Cooke (1871)

Type species
- Orbicula cyclospora Cooke (1871)

Species
- O. parietina; O. richenii

Genus of fungi

Orbicula is a genus of fungi belonging to the Pyronemataceae family. It consists of two species. The type species is Orbicula cyclospora, now known as Orbicula parietina. The genus was documented in 1871 by English mycologist Mordecai Cubitt Cooke.
