= Moravecia =

Scientific classification
- Domain: Eukaryota
- Kingdom: Fungi
- Division: Ascomycota
- Class: Pezizomycetes
- Order: Pezizales
- Family: Pyronemataceae
- Genus: Moravecia; Benkert, Caillet & Moyne (1987)

Type species
- Moravecia calospora (Quél.) Benkert, Caillet & Moyne (1987)

Genus of fungi

Moravecia is a genus of fungi in the family Pyronemataceae.
