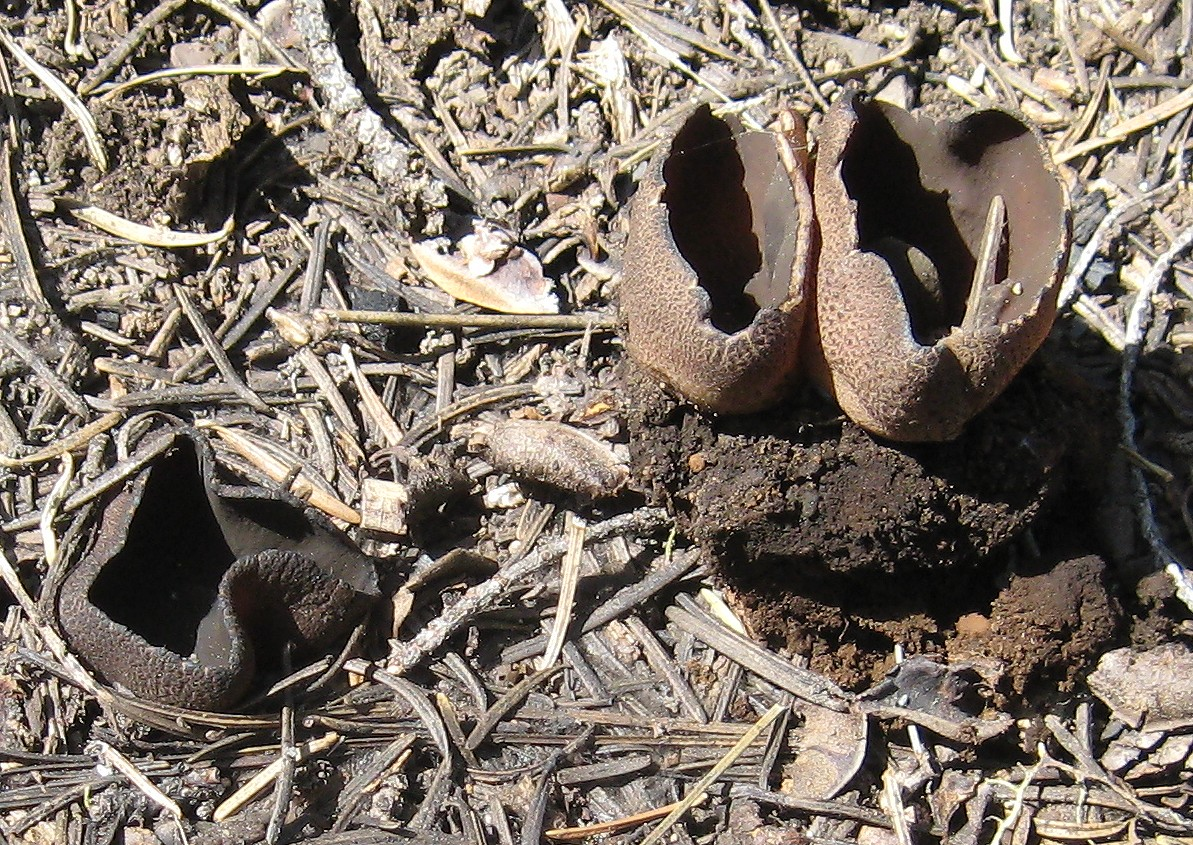

Scientific classification
- Kingdom: Fungi
- Division: Ascomycota
- Class: Pezizomycetes
- Order: Pezizales
- Family: Pezizaceae
- Genus: Plicaria
- Species: P. endocarpoides

Binomial name
- Plicaria endocarpoides Berk.

= Plicaria endocarpoides =

Species of fungus

Plicaria endocarpoides
- Mycological characteristics
- Smooth hymenium
- Hymenium attachment is irregular or not applicable
- Lacks a stipe
- Ecology is saprotrophic
- Edibility is unknown

Plicaria endocarpoides is a species of apothecial fungus belonging to the family Pezizaceae. This is a common European fungus of burnt ground, appearing from spring to autumn as dark brownish-coloured cups up to 6 cm in diameter, usually in groups. The caps usually flatten with age.

Plicaria trachycarpa is similar.
