= Jean Louis Émile Boudier =

French pharmacist and mycologist

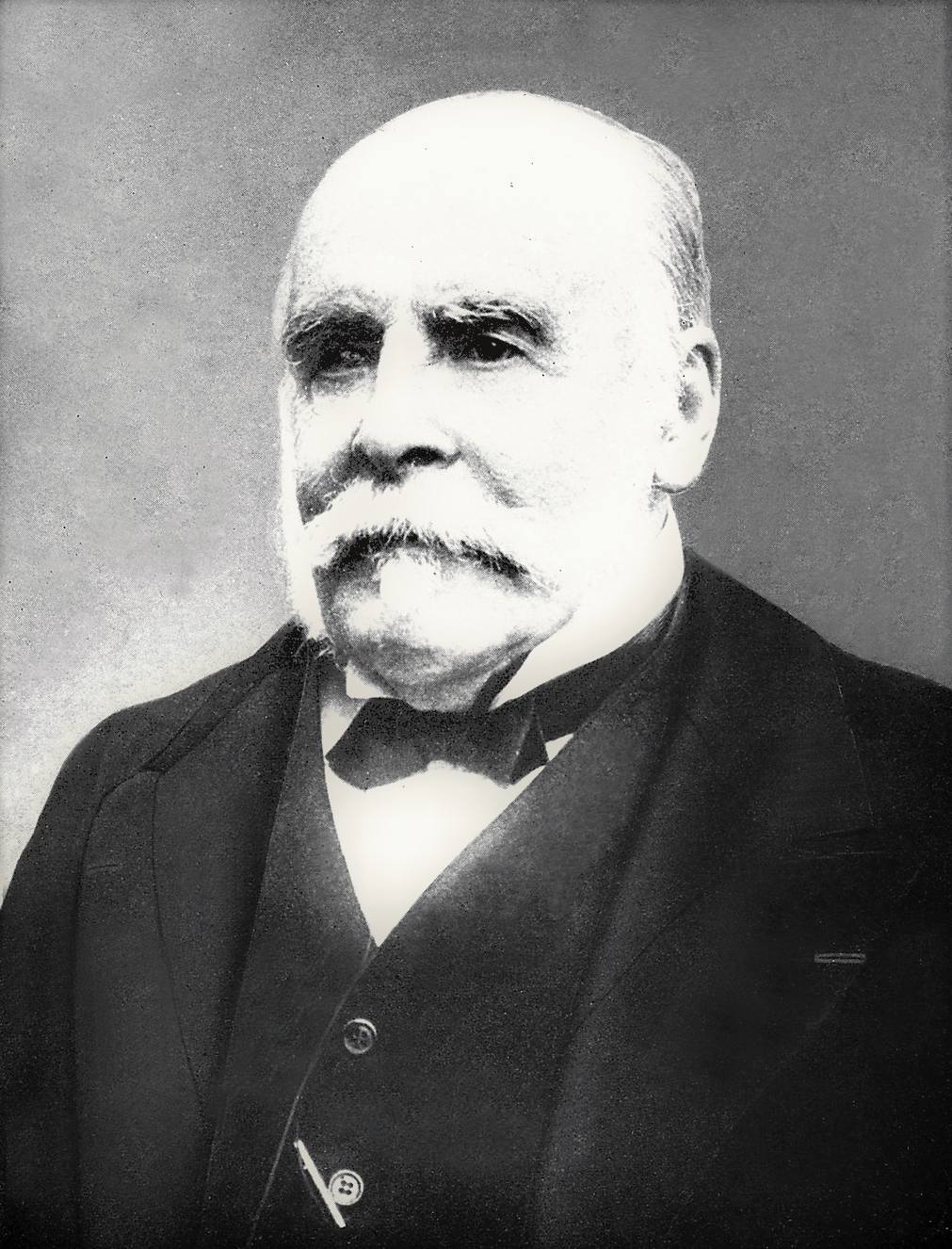
Émile Boudier

Jean Louis Émile Boudier (6 January 1828, in Garnay – 4 February 1920, in Blois) was a pharmacist who lived in Montmorency, France. He published a fair amount about the Discomycetes and other areas of mycology. He often used Émile as his first name.

He received his education at the École de Pharmacie de Paris, and in 1853, established a pharmacy in Enghien-les-Bains. He then became manager of his father's pharmacy, where he worked for many years. In 1878, he retired as a pharmacist in order to devote his time to scientific research.

He was a founding member of the Société mycologique de France (vice-president 1884; president 1887–90) and an honorary member of the British Mycological Society.

He named several species including Amanita franchetii, Disciotis venosa, Ptychoverpa bohemica, and Trichoglossum hirsutum.

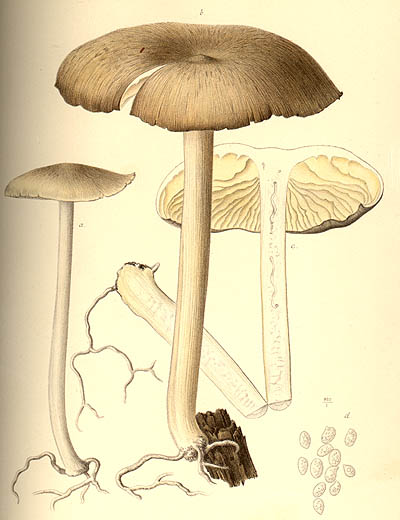
Illustration of Megacollybia platyphylla by Émile Boudier, in Icones mycologicae.

In 1897, botanist Pier Andrea Saccardo Sacc. published Boudierella which is a genus of fungi in the family Pyronemataceae and named in Jean Louis Émile Boudier's honor.

== Selected publications ==
- 1897: Révision analytique des morilles de France (Taxonomic revision of the morels of France).
- 1901: Influence de la nature du sol et les vegetaux qui y croissant sur le développement des champignons (The influence of the nature of the soil and the plants growing in the area on the development of fungi).
- 1904-1909: Icones mycologicae ou iconographie des champignons de France, principalement Discomycètes (Mycological pictures or iconography of the mushrooms of France, especially the Discomycetes); Boudier's magnum opus.
- 1907: Histoire et classification des Discomycètes d'Europe.
- 1911: La fresque de Plaincourault (Indre) (The fresco of Plaincourault (Indre).

== See also ==
- Category:Taxa named by Jean Louis Émile Boudier
