= Henry Dissing =

Danish mycologist (1931–2009)

Henry Dissing (1931 – 10 December 2009) was a Danish mycologist and specialist in cup fungi. He was a professor at the University of Copenhagen.

== Selected scientific works ==
- Dissing, Henry & Morten Lange (1962) Gasteromycetes of Congo. Bulletin du Jardin botanique de l'État à Bruxelles 32 (4): 325–416.
- Dissing, Henry (1966) The genus Helvella in Europe: with special emphasis on the species found in Norden. Dansk Botanisk Arkiv 25 (1): 1–172.
- Dissing, Henry (1981) Four new species of Discomycetes (Pezizales) from West Greenland. Mycologia 73 (2): 263–273.
- Dissing, Henry (1989) Mycological studies dedicated to Morten Lange. Opera Botanica 100. 274 s.
- Dissing, Henry & Sigmund Sivertsen (1988) Lathraeodiscus arcticus gen. nov. sp. nov. (order Pezizales): a new discomycete from North Greenland and Svalbard. Mycologia 80 (6): 832–836.

== See also ==
- Category:Taxa named by Henry Dissing
