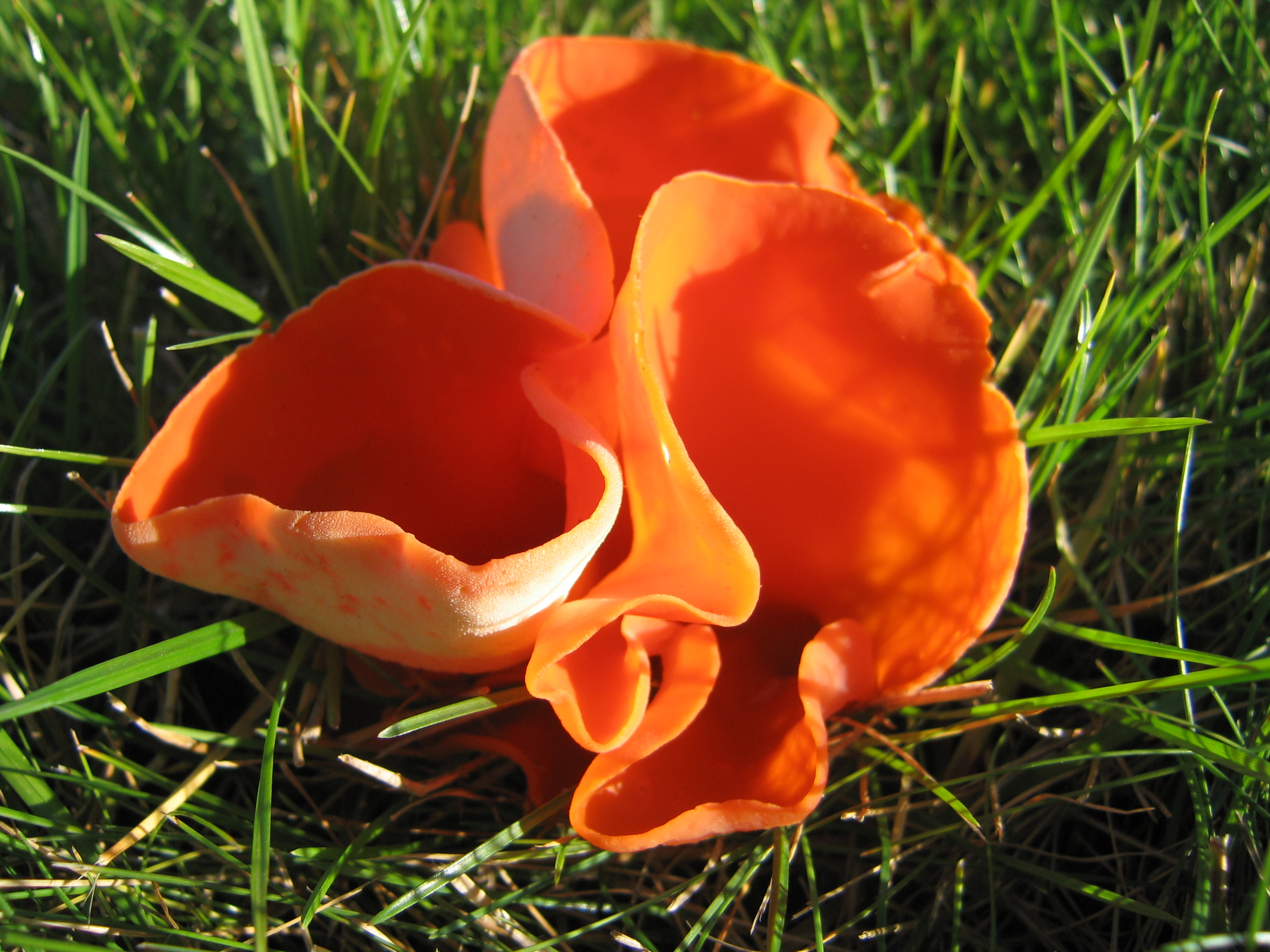
- Aleuria aurantia, member of the Pyronemataceae

Scientific classification
- Kingdom: Fungi
- Division: Ascomycota
- Class: Pezizomycetes
- Order: Pezizales
- Family: Pyronemataceae; Corda (1842)

Type genus
- Pyronema Carus (1834)

= Pyronemataceae =

Family of fungi

The Pyronemataceae are a family of fungi in the order Pezizales. It is the largest family of the Pezizales, encompassing 75 genera and approximately 500 species. Phylogenetic analyses does not support the prior classifications of this family, and suggest that the family is not monophyletic as it is currently circumscribed.

== Morphology ==
Members of the family are diverse in ascomatal or cleistothecial form. Individual taxa may be sessile (without a stipe) to shortly stipitate, cupulate (cup-shaped), discoid (disc-shaped), pulvinate (cushion-shaped), or with turbinate (turban-shaped) epigeous apothecia. Also, taxa may be sub-hypogeous to hypogeous with closed, folded, or solid ascomata. Apothecia may range in size from less than 1 mm up to 12 cm (4 1/2 in) in diameter, and may be brightly colored due to carotenoid pigments. Genera of the Pyronemataceae lack unifying macroscopic or microscopic characteristics; this lack of uniting characters has led various authors to propose a variety of classification schemes.

== Genera ==
This list of genera in the family Pyronemataceae. The genus name is followed by the author citation, year of publication, and number of species.

- Acervus Kanouse (1938) – 9 spp.
- Aleuria Fuckel (1870) – ca. 10 spp.
- Aleurina Massee (1898) – ca. 10 spp.
- Anthracobia Boud. (1885) – ca. 10 spp.
- Aparaphysaria Speg. (1922) – 2 spp.
- Arpinia Berthet (1974) – 4 spp.
- Ascocalathium Eidam ex J.Schröt. (1893) – 1 sp.
- Ascosparassis Kobayasi (1960) – 1 sp.
- Aurantiolachnea Van Vooren (2021) – 1 sp.
- Boubovia Svrček (1977) – 7 spp.
- Byssonectria P.Karst. (1881) – 7 spp.
- Boudierella Sacc. (1895) – 1 sp.
- Chaetothiersia B.A.Perry & Pfister (2008) – 1 sp.
- Chalazion Dissing & Sivertsen (1975) – 3 spp.
- Cheilymenia Boud. (1885) – 67 spp.
- Cupulina Dougoud, Van Vooren & M.Vega (2015) – 2 spp.
- Dictyocoprotus J.C.Krug & R.S.Khan (1991) – 1 sp.
- Eoaleurina Korf & W.Y.Zhuang (1986) – 1 sp.
- Galeoscypha Svrček & J.Moravec (1989) – 1 sp.
- Genabea Tul. & C.Tul. (1844) – 5 spp.
- Genea Vittad. (1831) – ca. 40 spp.
- Geneosperma Rifai (1968) – 2 spp.
- Geopora Harkn. (1885) – ca. 20 spp.
- Geopyxis (Pers.) Sacc. (1889) –
- Gilkeya M.E.Sm., Trappe & Rizzo (2007) – 1 sp.
- Hiemsia Svrček (1969) – 2 spp.
- Hoffmannoscypha Stielow, Göker & Klenk (2012) – 1 sp.
- Humaria Fuckel (1870) – ca. 10 spp.
- Hydnocystis Tul. & C.Tul. (1844) – 7 spp.
- Hypotarzetta Donadini (1985) – 1 spp.
- Jafnea Korf (1960) – 2 spp.
- Lamprospora De Not. (1863) – ca. 50 spp.
- Lasiobolidium Malloch & Cain (1971) – 13
- Lasiocupulina Van Vooren & M.Vega (2018) – 1 sp.
- Lathraeodiscus Dissing & Sivertsen (1989) – 1 sp.
- Lazuardia Rifai (1988) – 1 sp.
- Leucoscypha Boud. (1885) – 10 spp.
- Lotinia Pérez-Butrón Fern.-Vic. & P.Alvarado (2015) – 1 sp.
- Luciotrichus R.Galán & Raitv. (1995) – 1 sp.
- Melastiza Boud. (1885) – ca. 10 spp.
- Micronematobotrys Xiang Sun & L.D.Guo (2010) – 1 sp.
- Miladina Svrček (1972) – 1 sp.
- Monascella Guarro & Arx (1986) – 1 sp.
- Moravecia Benkert, Caillet & Moyne (1987) – 2 spp.
- Mycogalopsis Gjurašin (1925) – 1 sp.
- Neottiella (Cooke) Sacc. (1889) – ca. 5 spp.
- Nothojafnea Rifai (1968) – 2 spp.
- Octospora Hedw. (1789) – ca. 50 spp.
- Octosporella Döbbeler (1980) – 16 spp.
- Orbicula Cooke (1871) – 2 spp.
- Otidea (Pers.) Bonord. (1851) – ca. 52 spp.
- Oviascoma Y.J.Yao & Spooner (1996) – 1 sp.
- Parascutellinia Svrček (1975) – 6 spp.
- Paratricharina Van Vooren, U.Lindemann, M.Vega, Ribes, Illescas & Matočec (2015) – 1 sp.
- Paratrichophaea Trigaux (1985) – 5 spp.
- Parawilcoxina Van Vooren (2021) – 1 sp.
- Paurocotylis Berk. (1855) – 8 spp.
- Perilachnea Van Vooren (2021) – 6 spp.
- Petchiomyces E.Fisch. & Mattir. (1938) – 1 sp.
- Picoa Vittad. (1831) – 2 spp.
- Planamyces Crous & Decock (2017) – 1 sp.
- Pseudaleuria Lusk (1987) – 2 spp.
- Pseudotricharina Van Vooren, Tello & M.Vega (2019) – 3 spp.
- Pulvinula Boud. (1885) – 26 spp.
- Pyronema Carus (1834) – 3 spp.
- Pyropyxis Egger (1984) – 1 sp.
- Ramsbottomia W.D.Buckley (1923) – 3 spp.
- Rhizoblepharia Rifai (1968) – 2 spp.
- Rhodoscypha Dissing & Sivertsen (1983) – 1 sp.
- Rhodotarzetta Dissing & Sivertsen (1983) – 2 spp.
- Scutellinia (Cooke) Lambotte (1887) – 70 spp.
- Selenaspora R.Heim & Le Gal (1936) – 1 sp.
- Sepultariella Van Vooren, U.Lindemmann & Healy (2017) – 2 spp.
- Smardaea Svrček (1969) – 9 spp.
- Smarodsia Raitv. & Vimba (2006) – 1 sp.
- Sowerbyella Nannf. (1938) – 17 spp.
- Sphaerosoma Klotzsch (1839) – 11 spp.
- Sphaerosporella (Svrček) Svrček & Kubička (1961) – 3 spp.
- Spooneromyces T.Schumach. & J.Moravec (1989) – 5 spp.
- Tricharina Eckblad (1968) – 12 spp.
- Trichophaea Boud. (1885) – 26 spp.
- Trichophaeopsis Korf & Erb (1972) – 4 spp.
- Wenyingia Zheng Wang & Pfister (2001) – 1 sp.
- Wilcoxina Chin S.Yang & Korf (1985) – 5 spp.
