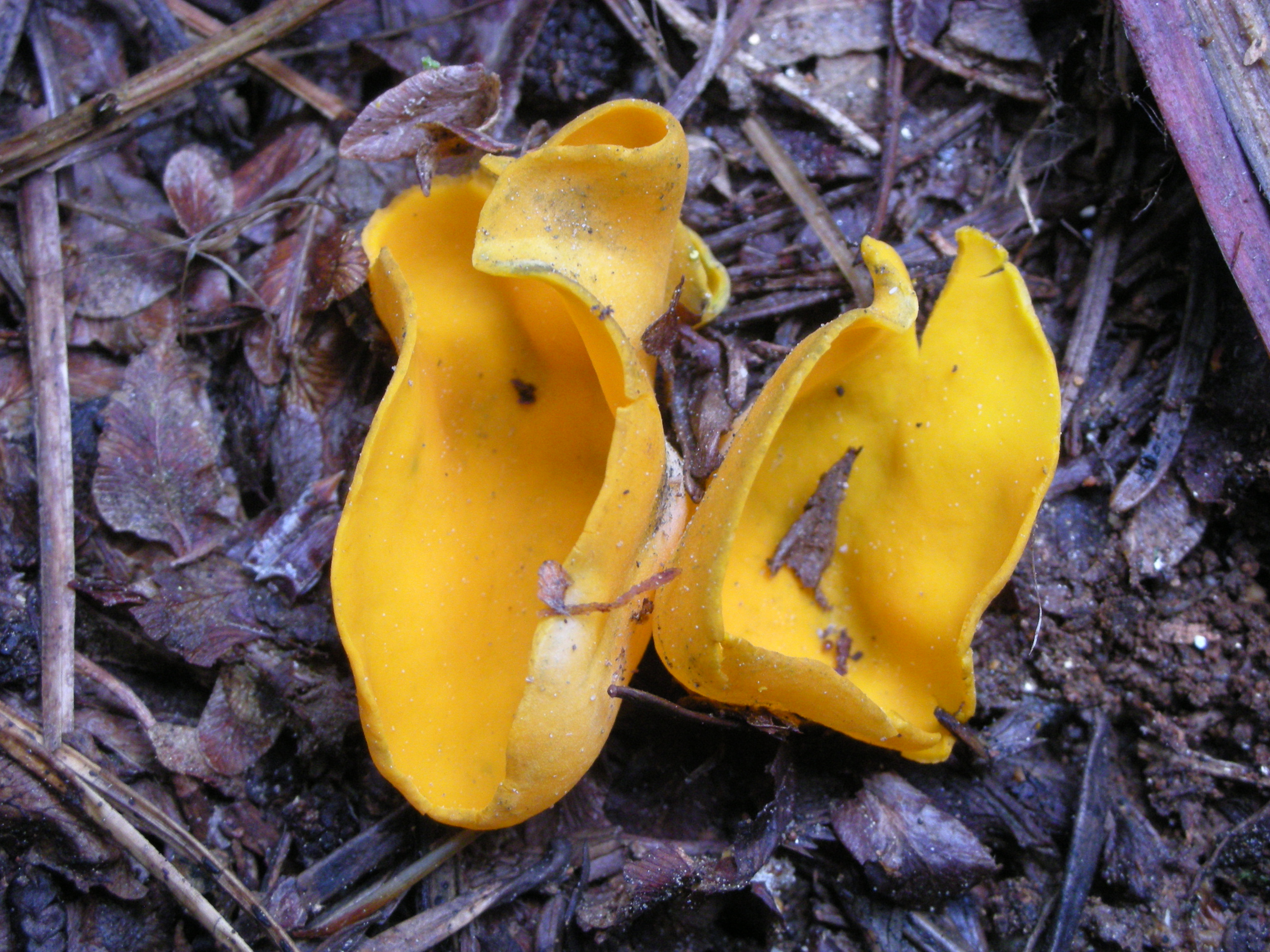

Scientific classification
- Kingdom: Fungi
- Division: Ascomycota
- Class: Pezizomycetes
- Order: Pezizales
- Family: Caloscyphaceae
- Genus: Caloscypha; Boud. (1885)
- Species: C. fulgens

Binomial name
- Caloscypha fulgens (Pers.) Boud. (1885)

Synonyms
- Peziza fulgens Pers. (1822); Otidella fulgens (Pers.) Sacc. (1889); Barlaea fulgens (Pers.) Rehm (1908); Lamprospora fulgens (Pers.) Snyder (1936); Geniculodendron pyriforme G.A.Salt (1974); Pseudoplectania fulgens (Pers.) Fuckel

= Caloscypha =

Genus of fungi

Caloscypha fulgens Mycological characteristics
- Glebal hymenium
- No distinct cap
- Hymenium attachment is not applicable
- Lacks a stipe
- Spore print is white
- Ecology is saprotrophic
- Edibility is inedible

Caloscypha is a fungal genus in the family Caloscyphaceae (order Pezizales). A monotypic genus, it contains the single species Caloscypha fulgens, commonly known as the snowbank orange peel fungus, spring orange peel fungus, the golden cup, or the dazzling cup. It is a cup fungus, typically up to 4 centimetres (1 5/8 in) in diameter, with a bright to pale orange interior and orange; specimens that are old or bruised often have an olive-green discoloration, especially around the edges.

In North America, C. fulgens is usually found on the ground in forest litter near conifers. Fruiting occurs in early spring following snow melt. The asexual (imperfect), or conidial stage of C. fulgens is the plant pathogenic species Geniculodendron pyriforme, known to infect dormant seeds of the Sitka spruce.

== Taxonomy ==
This species was first described by Christian Hendrik Persoon in 1822 as Peziza fulgens, and has been grouped in several different genera since its original description. Phylogenetic analysis of DNA sequence data shows that within the order Pezizales, Caloscypha fulgens belongs in an evolutionary lineage with the families Helvellaceae, Morchellaceae, and Tuberaceae. Since 1968, Caloscypha had been placed in the family Pyronemataceae, a small grouping of fungi distinguished from other Pezizales by their relatively undeveloped peridium. In 2002, the new family Caloscyphaceae was described to contain the monotypic genus Caloscypha.

=== Etymology ===
The specific epithet means "bright colored", while the genus name Caloscypha means "beautiful cup". The distinctive orange-yellow color of the fungus has earned it the common names "spring orange peel fungus", the "golden cup", and the "dazzling cup".

== Description ==
The fruiting body of C. fulgens is roughly cup-shaped, although the cup may be somewhat flattened, lopsided or split; the size is up to 6 centimetres (2 3/8 inches) in diameter. The inner surface of the cup is orange-yellow, while the external surface is pale yellow. Either the margin around the rim or the entire outer surface may be stained olive-green. The green or bluish staining that occurs upon injury or with age is unique within the order Pezizales. The stem, if present, is rather short. The spore deposit is white.

A single specimen of an albino form, 2 cm (3/4 in) in diameter, was discovered in Northern Idaho; it was found to be lacking the pigment responsible for staining the outer surface olive-green.

The spores are translucent (hyaline), roughly spherical, thin-walled and smooth, with dimensions of 6–8 μm in diameter. The asci, the spore-bearing cells, are cylindrical and 80–100 by 7–8 μm; the paraphyses are thin and filamentous and contain orange granules. This fungus is considered nonpoisonous but inedible.

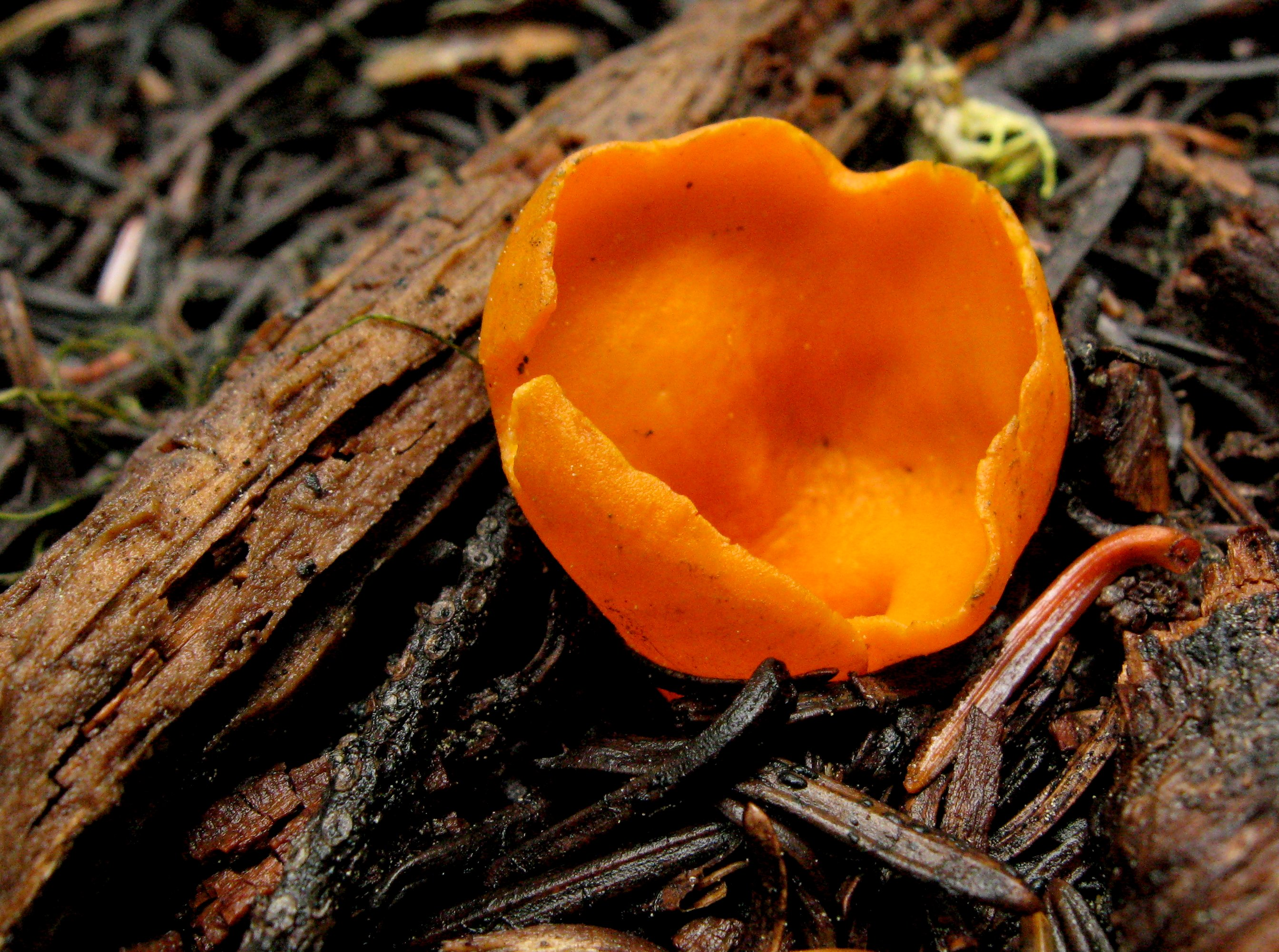
From Trinity National Forest, California

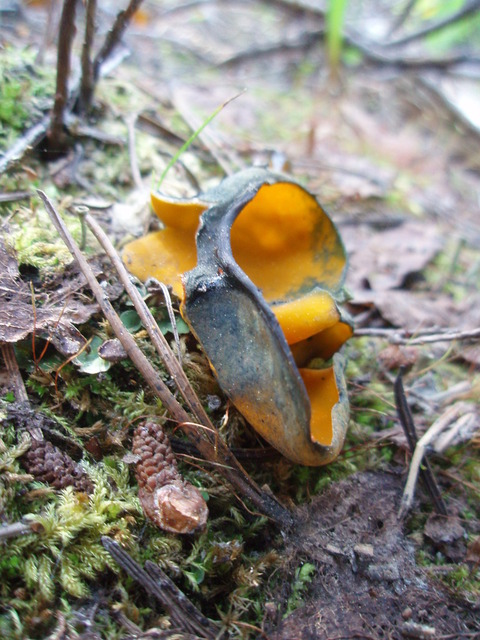
Specimen with blue staining near the edges

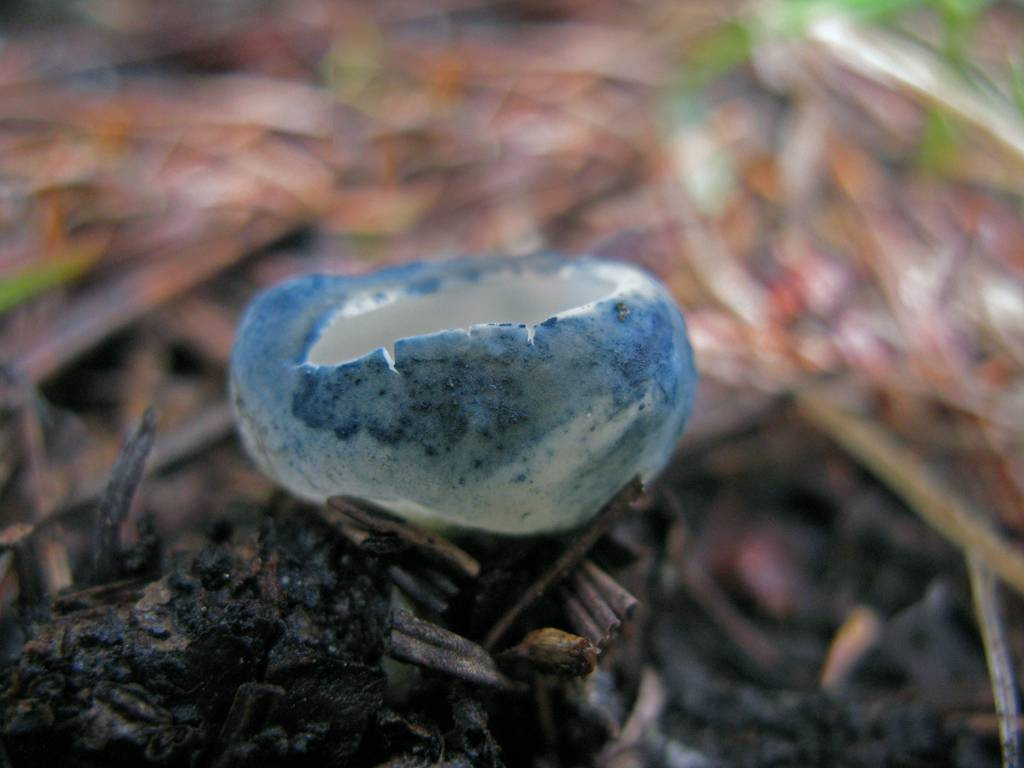
A rare albino mutant lacking orange pigment

=== Similar species ===
C. fulgens bears some resemblance to the orange-peel fungus (Aleuria aurantia); however, A. aurantia does not have the characteristic bluing reaction upon bruising or with age, and it fruits later in the season (usually in autumn).

It also bears similarities to Otidea species (e.g. O. onotica) which do not stain blue.

== Distribution and habitat ==
This species is usually found in the spring, often on duff under conifers shortly after the snow melts. In North America, where it has been noted to occur only between March and July, it is widespread in the Rocky Mountains and the Pacific Northwest. C. fulgens has been collected in Britain, and possibly arrived there from imported infected seeds. It has also been collected from Japan, Sweden, The Netherlands, and Turkey.

== Imperfect state ==
The life cycle of this fungus allows for both an imperfect (making asexual spores, or conidia) or perfect (making sexual spores) form; as has often happened in fungal taxonomy, the imperfect form was given a different name, because the relationship between the perfect and imperfect forms of the same species was not then known. The imperfect, or conidial stage of this fungus is the plant pathogen Geniculodendron pyrofirme, first reported in 1964, and known to infect dormant seeds of the Sitka spruce, Picea sitchensis.

A 1978 study showed that about a third of Sitka spruce seed lots stored by the British Columbia Forest Service (Canada) contained diseased seeds, and these diseased seeds failed to germinate when sown in local nurseries. The fungus can grow at low temperatures, contributing to its ability to kill seeds before they have a chance to germinate. Infected seeds tend to shrivel and dry up rather than rot.

Seed lots from squirrel seed caches have increased incidence of C. fulgens infection. Squirrels tend to cache pinecones repeatedly in the same location, and in cool, moist conditions favorable for fungus growth. In 2002, G. pyriforme was found on imported conifer seeds in Germany, the first such report in continental Europe.

== Conservation ==
C. fulgens is listed on the Red List of protected species in Slovakia.
