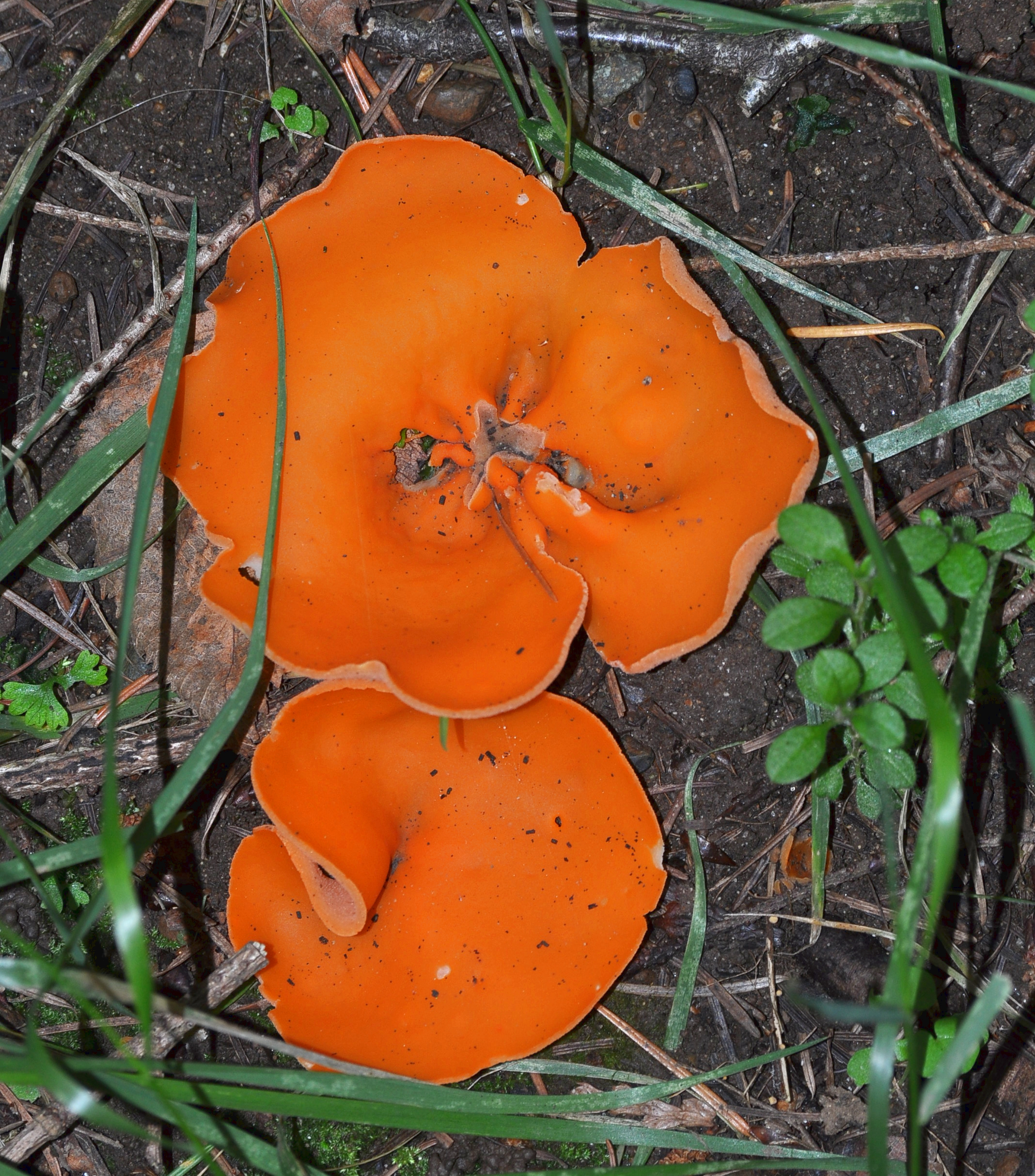

Scientific classification
- Kingdom: Fungi
- Division: Ascomycota
- Class: Pezizomycetes
- Order: Pezizales
- Family: Pyronemataceae
- Genus: Aleuria
- Species: A. aurantia

Binomial name
- Aleuria aurantia (Pers.) Fuckel, 1870

Synonyms
- Peziza aurantia Pers. 1800; Scodellina aurantia (Pers.) Gray

= Aleuria aurantia =

Orange peel fungus

Species of fungus

Aleuria aurantia
- Mycological characteristics
- Smooth hymenium
- No distinct cap
- Hymenium attachment is irregular or not applicable
- Lacks a stipe
- Spore print is white
- Ecology is saprotrophic
- Edibility is edible

Aleuria aurantia (orange peel fungus) is a widespread ascomycete fungus in the order Pezizales. The bright orange, cup-shaped ascocarps often resemble orange peels strewn on the ground, giving this species its common name.

== Taxonomy ==
Christiaan Hendrik Persoon described the orange peel as Peziza aurantia in 1800. The specific epithet is the Latin word aurantia "orange". Karl Wilhelm Gottlieb Leopold Fuckel placed it the genus Aleuria in 1870.

== Description ==
The orange fruiting body is 1–10 centimetres (1/2–4 inches) wide, cup-shaped, externally fuzzy, and often misshapen due to crowding from other fruiting bodies. The flesh is fragile. The spores produce a white spore print, and scatter in visible clouds when disturbed.

A variety with smaller spores appears in the Pacific Northwest.

It is fairly unique, resembling a discarded orange peel more than other fungi. Aleuria rhenana, Melastiza chateri, and species of Otidea may be vaguely similar.

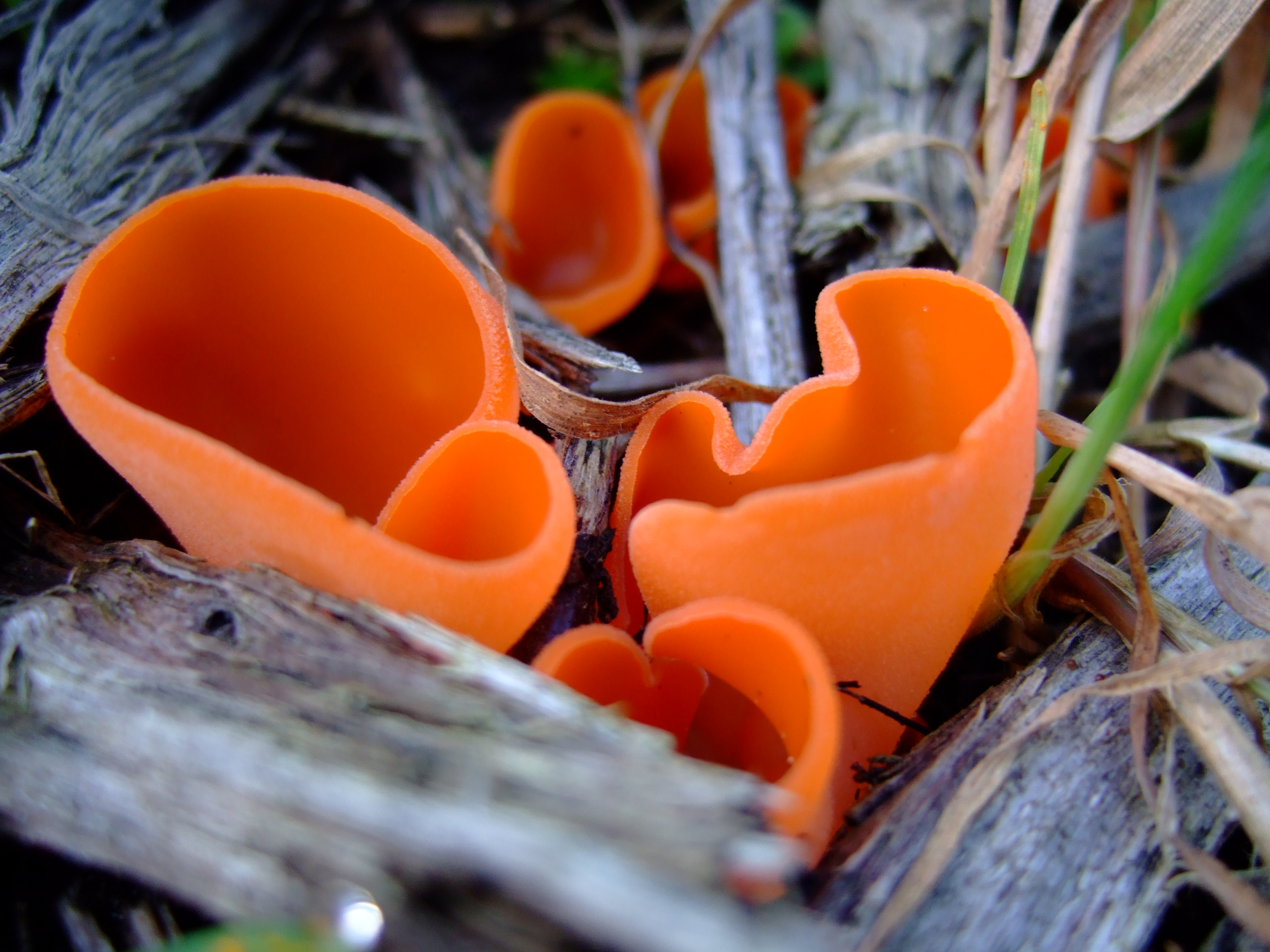
Growing in Hamburg, Germany

=== Similar species ===
Similar species include Acervus epispartius, Caloscypha fulgens, Sarcoscypha coccinea, Sowerbyella rhenana, and members of the genera Melastiza, Otidea, Peziza, Pithya, and Pulvinula. Particularly In Europe, A. aurantia may be confused with species of Otidea or Caloscypha which are poisonous or of unknown edibility.

== Distribution and habitat ==
The orange peel fungus grows throughout North America, from November to March in the West and May to November in the East. It can also be found in south Chile and in Europe. It fruits mainly on bare clay or disturbed soil.

== Uses ==
It is generally regarded as edible, though difficult to collect intact and not necessarily choice. It can be served in thin slices and preserved by drying.
