= Otidea concinna =

Scientific classification
- Domain: Eukaryota
- Kingdom: Fungi
- Division: Ascomycota
- Class: Pezizomycetes
- Order: Pezizales
- Family: Pyronemataceae
- Genus: Otidea
- Species: O. concinna

Binomial name
- Otidea concinna (Pers.) Sacc. (1889)

Synonyms
- Flavoscypha cantharella Boud. Helvella scutellata Schaeff. (1774); Peziza cerea Bull. (1781); Peziza flavescens Pers. (1800); Peziza concinna Pers. (1822)

Species of fungus

Otidea concinna is a species of apothecial fungus belonging to the family Pyronemataceae. This rather uncommon European species appears from late summer to autumn as vivid yellow elongated "ears" in small groups in woodland and parkland. Compared to some species of the genus, O. concinna looks like the tops of the 'ears' have been chopped off.

Similar species include O. alutacea and O. microspora.
