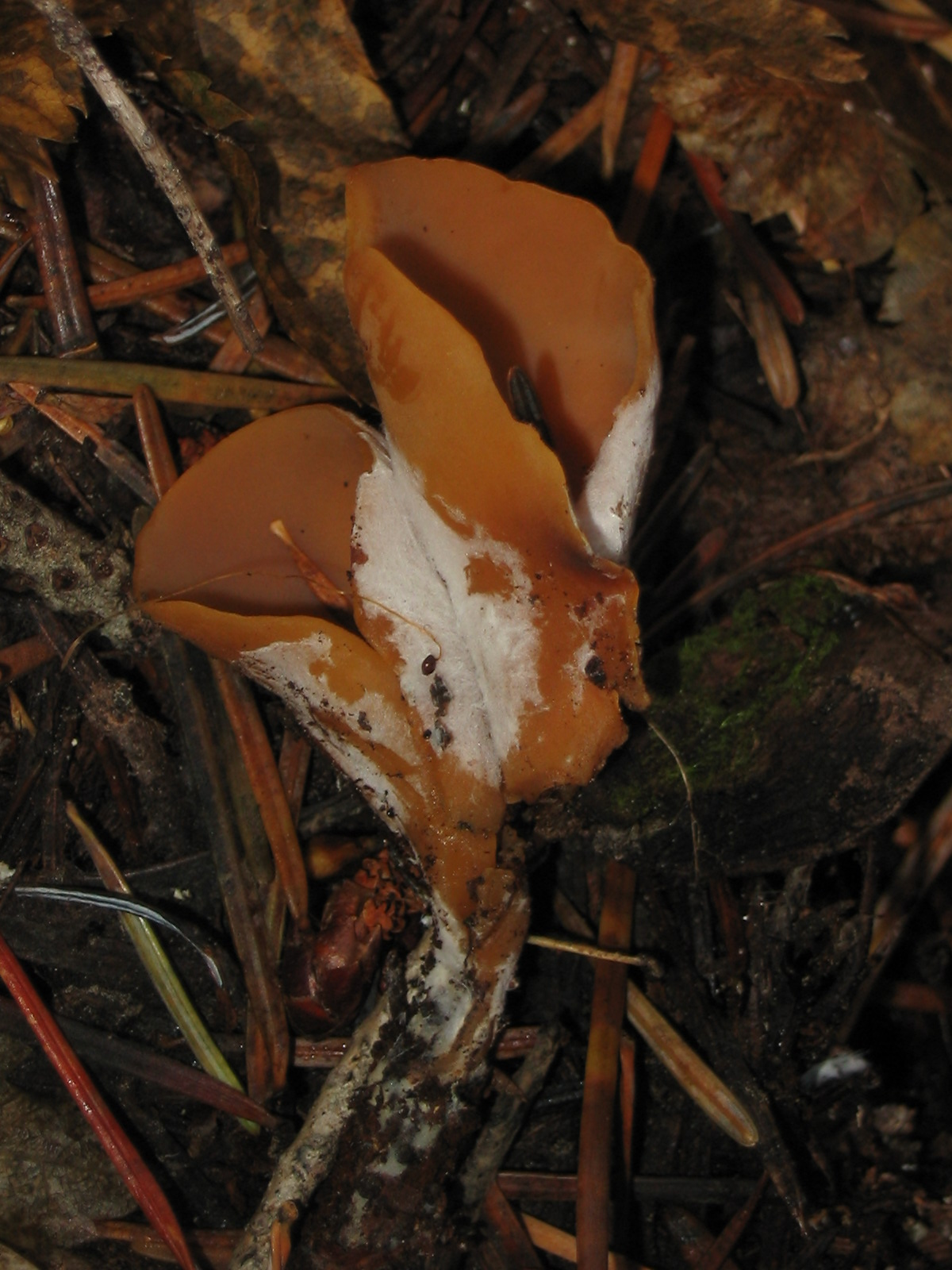

Conservation status
- Apparently Secure (NatureServe)

Scientific classification
- Domain: Eukaryota
- Kingdom: Fungi
- Division: Ascomycota
- Class: Pezizomycetes
- Order: Pezizales
- Family: Pyronemataceae
- Genus: Otidea
- Species: O. leporina

Binomial name
- Otidea leporina (Batsch) Fuckel (1870)

Synonyms
- Helvella auricula Schaeff. (1774); Peziza leporina Batsch (1783); Scodellina leporina (Batsch) Gray (1821); Scodellina auricula (Schaeff.) Seaver (1928); Helvella leporina (Batsch) Franchi, L.Lami & M.Marchetti (1999)

= Otidea leporina =

Species of fungus

Otidea leporina is a species of fungus in the family Pyronemataceae. It was given its current name by Karl Wilhelm Gottlieb Leopold Fuckel in 1870. It contains toxins which may cause serious gastric upset.
