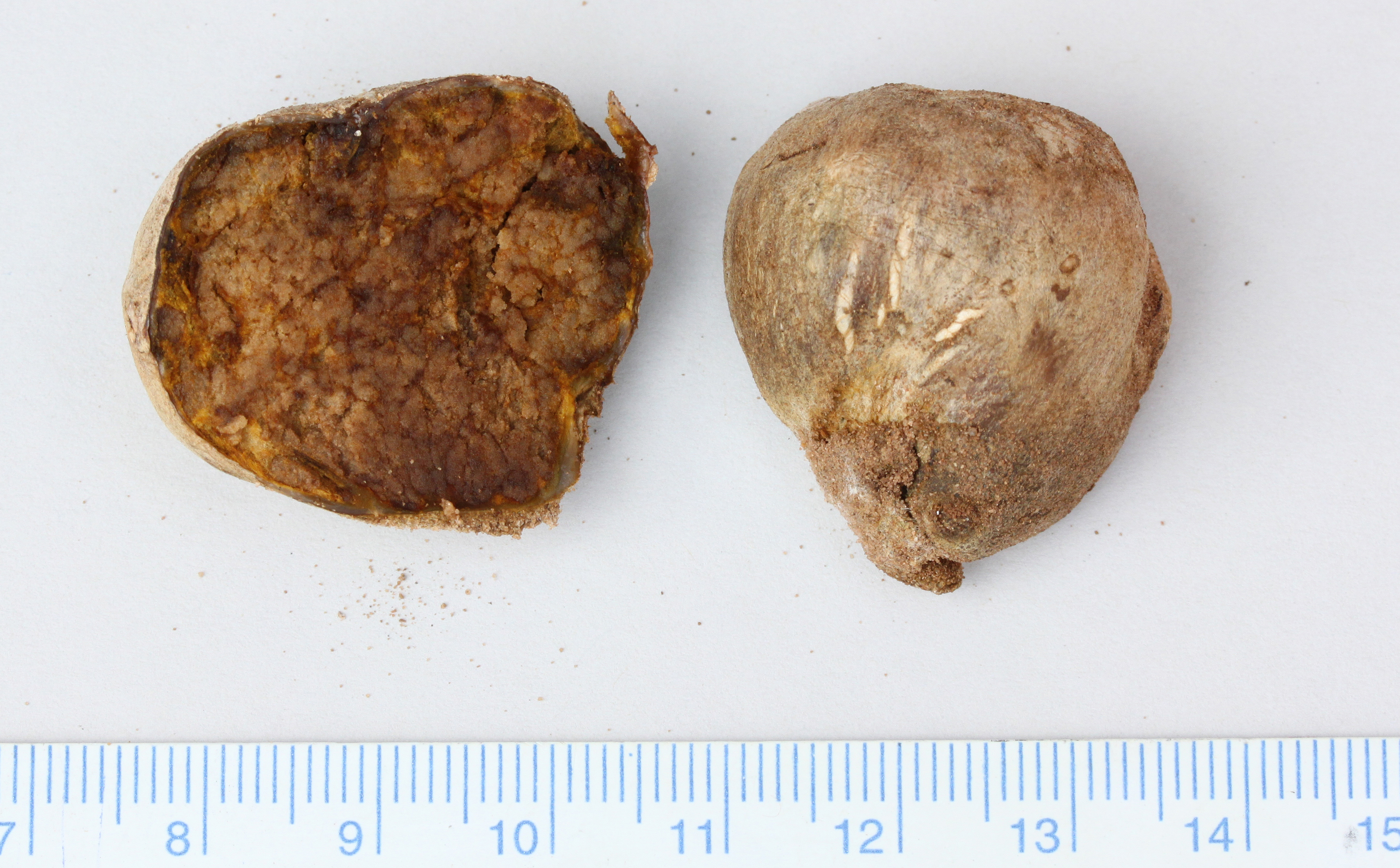
- Carbomyces sp. in New Mexico

Scientific classification
- Kingdom: Fungi
- Division: Ascomycota
- Class: Pezizomycetes
- Order: Pezizales
- Family: Carbomycetaceae
- Genus: Carbomyces
- Species: C. emergens

Binomial name
- Carbomyces emergens Gilkey

= Carbomyces emergens =

Species of fungus

Carbomyces emergens is a truffle in the genus Carbomyces, a small genus common to the Chihuahuan desert in the southwestern United States and Mexico. C. emergens is regarded as the most common and widely distributed species in Carbomyces, also serving as the genus' type species. C. emergens belongs to the Carbomycetaceae family, in the order Pezizales, class Pezizomycetes, division Ascomycota.

== Naming and history ==
The name Carbomyces emergens comes from Latin and Greek root words. For the genus, carbo from Latin meaning “carbon” and -myces from Greek meaning “fungus” gives the literal name “carbonized fungus”. This is in reference to the original author of the species, Helen Margaret Gilkey, who described the dried periderm of the fungus as having a “texture somewhat that of carbonized wood”. The specific epithet emergens comes from Latin and means emerging. This name describes the way that the fungus emerges at the Earth's surface during maturity.

Carbomyces emergens, one of only three species in the Carbomyces genus, was first discovered in Carlsbad, New Mexico by Helen Margaret Gilkey in 1954. Gilkey originally placed Carbomyces in the family Terfeziaceae. However, species in Carbomyces have fertile tissues separated into pockets by sterile veins that are markedly different than other species in Terfeziaceae. This led to Carbomyces being placed in its own family, Carbomycetaceae in 1971 by J.M. Trappe. This family has since been widely accepted by several authors. In 2001, Trappe & Weber described C. emergens in detail.

In the same paper, Trappe & Weber transferred a previously misplaced species from Abstoma to Carbomyces. The species was originally Abstoma longii, and would’ve been renamed Carbomyces longii, but this epithet was already used within Carbomyces, so it was named C. gilbertsonii instead. Carbomyces has been determined to be related to Terfezia and Kalaharituber.

== Description and morphology ==
Carbomyces emergens is a hypogeous desert truffle. The term desert truffle refers to several edible fungi that grow either entirely under the surface of the earth, or partially covered by it. Many are primarily dispersed by animals. C. emergens is white to cream in color or yellow to brownish orange, with an occasionally cracked, glaucous surface. The fruiting body is 5-30mm x 8-40mm in size. The fungus has only been found loose on sand or dirt, indicating that the fruiting body emerges at maturity and is released.

On a microscopic level, C. emergens has a two-layered peridium with the texture of carbonized wood. The fungus is found as with a gleba of large, thin-walled hyphae, which disintegrates at maturity to form a powdery spore mass. It has brown-walled, nonamyloid asci, sub-globose to globose in shape. Each ascus contains eight clustered ascospores, which are globose or ellipsoid, smooth or minutely roughened, or verrucose. C. emergens has “nest-like” areas with asci, separated with sterile veins. The ascomata is hypogeous, is found singularly or in clusters, and has regular to compressed or turbinate stereothecia.

== Distribution and habitat ==
Carbomyces emergens is endemic to desert habitats. It's been found across the southwestern United States, from New Mexico to southern California, in the Chihuahuan desert. It has also recently been found in Mexico in the central Chihuahuan desert. However, most of the world remains unexplored for hypogeous fungi, so this range being even more extensive is highly probable.

Carbomyces emergens has been found on arid lands, in xeric conditions, on sandy soils, sand hills and dunes. Every collection occurrence of C. emergens indicates that the fungus is only found lying loose on soil where it is then windblown into arroyos, brush patches, and the like. It has been documented in close range to Artemisia, Atriplex, Prosopis, and various herbaceous species.

== Life cycle and ecology ==
Not much is known of the ecology of Carbomyces species. C. emergens has been found to appear from September to April. The truffles are thought to emerge at maturity and dry in the desert sun and dry air. The glebal cells, which are thin-walled and inflated, disintegrate to form a powdery mass containing spores, asci, and cell fragments. Ecologically, C. emergens has been thought to use animal mycophagy as its primary spore dispersal strategy. It is often eaten by rodents, especially the spotted ground squirrel.

Many desert truffles form mycorrhizal associations with annual or perennial plants, but C. emergens has only been found as arbuscular mycorrhizae. C. emergens likely forms mycorrhizal associations with desert shrubs or trees, such as Cistaceae. While there is not much information about the associations that it forms, C. emergens is thought to mainly form ectomycorrhizal associations with perennial hosts.
