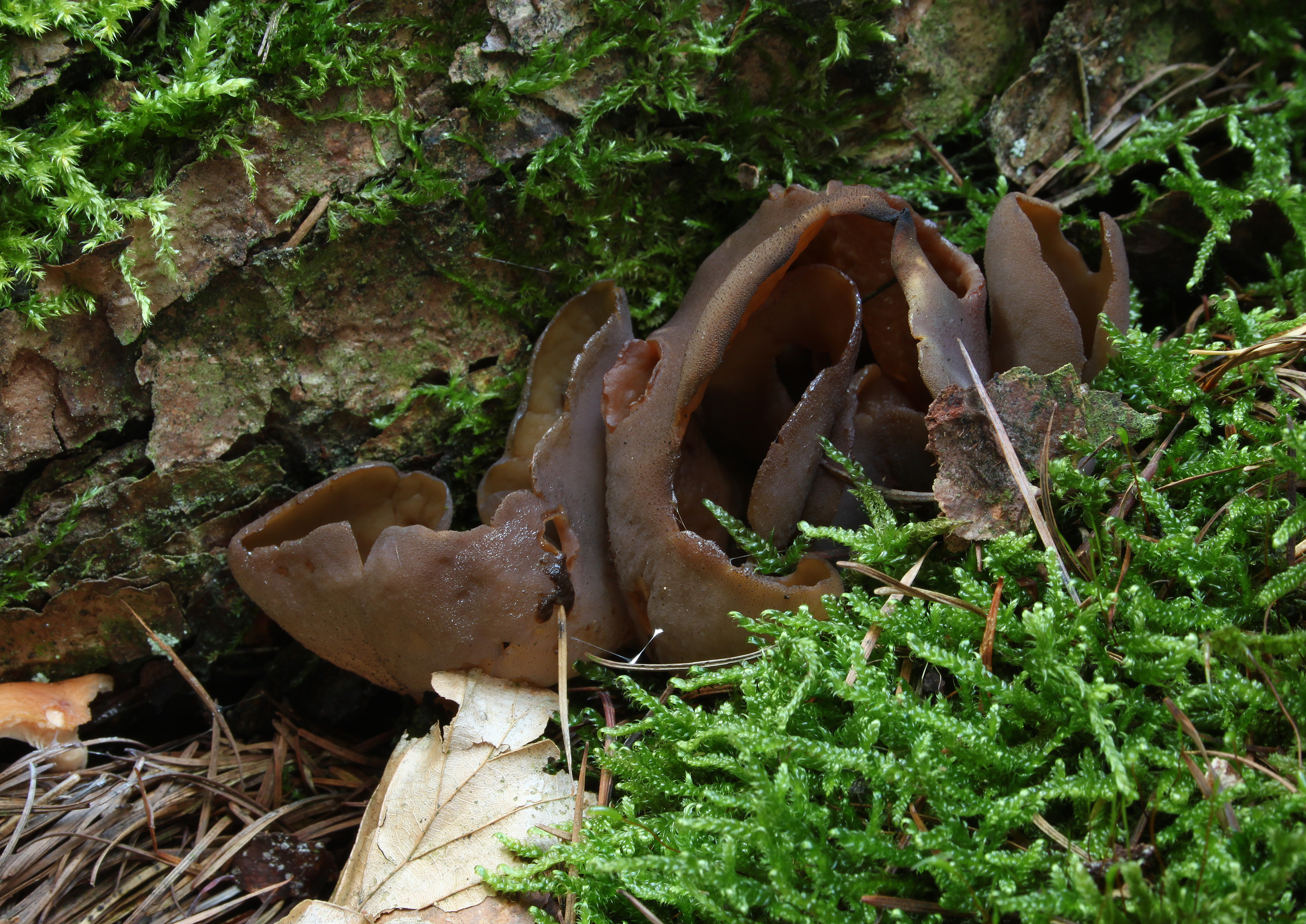

Scientific classification
- Domain: Eukaryota
- Kingdom: Fungi
- Division: Ascomycota
- Class: Pezizomycetes
- Order: Pezizales
- Family: Pyronemataceae
- Genus: Otidea
- Species: O. bufonia

Binomial name
- Otidea bufonia Pers. (1822)

= Otidea bufonia =

Species of fungus

Otidea bufonia is a species of apothecial fungus belonging to the family Pyronemataceae. The fruit body appears from late summer to early autumn as a dark brown, deep cup, split down one side, up to 6 cm (2 1/4 in) high and the same across.

A rare European species, it occurs singly or in small groups on soil in woodland.

While similar to many other species within Otidea, bufonia can be characterized by its narrow fusoid ascospores and the presence of hyphae with striate resinous exudates in the medullary excipulum.
