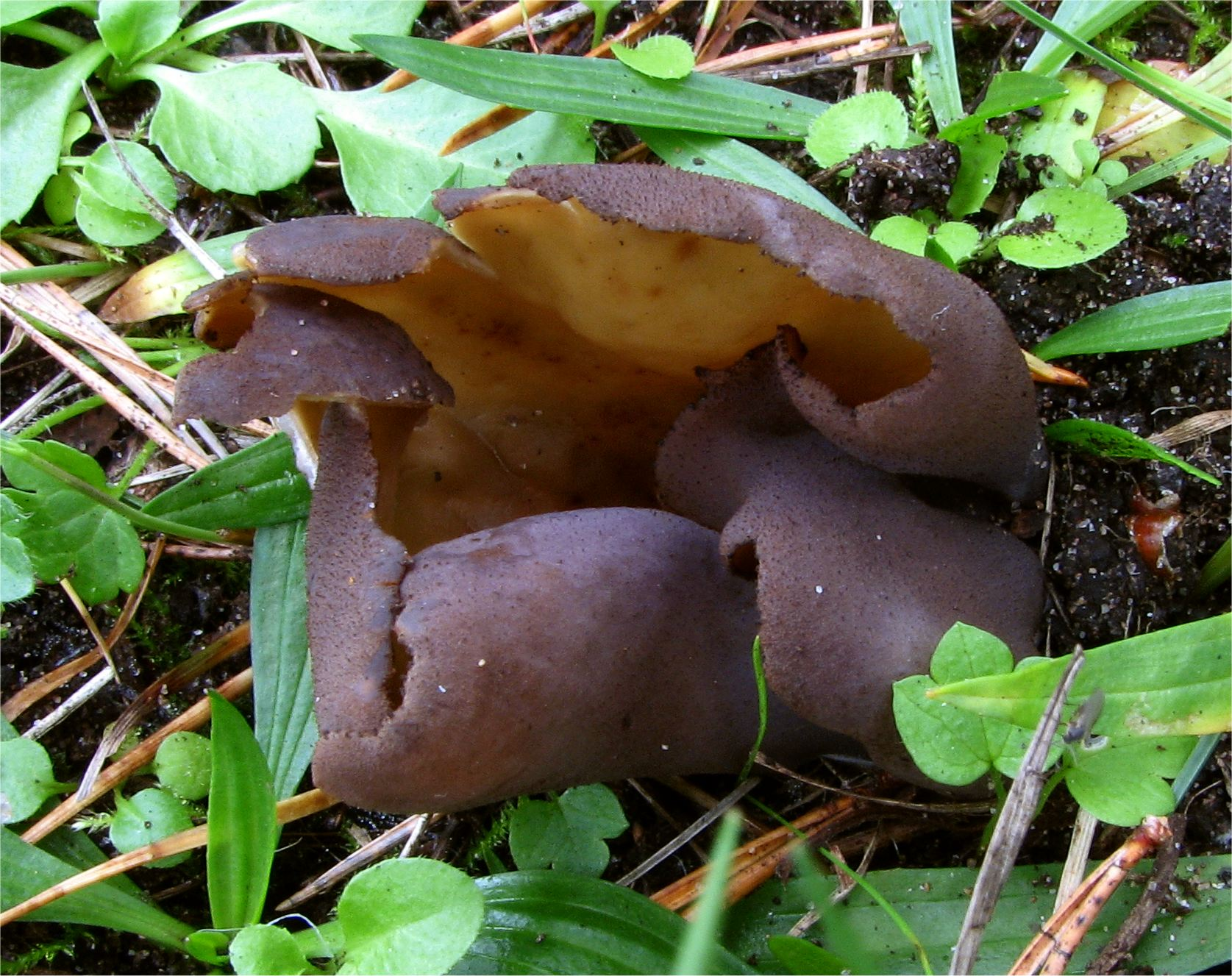
- In Gotland, Sweden

Scientific classification
- Domain: Eukaryota
- Kingdom: Fungi
- Division: Ascomycota
- Class: Pezizomycetes
- Order: Pezizales
- Family: Pyronemataceae
- Genus: Otidea
- Species: O. mirabilis

Binomial name
- Otidea mirabilis Bolognini & Jamoni (2001)

= Otidea mirabilis =

Species of fungus

Otidea mirabilis is a species of fungus in the family Pyronemataceae. Found in Europe, it was described as new to science in 2001. Its fruit bodies are typically 2–3 cm (0.8–1.2 in) tall by 2–3.5 cm (0.8–1.4 in) wide, and they be clustered together as an aggregate, or in groups. The flesh is about 1 mm thick, and yellow-brown. The spores are ellipsoid, smooth, contain two oil droplets, and measure 10–14.7 by 6.4–7.2 μm.
