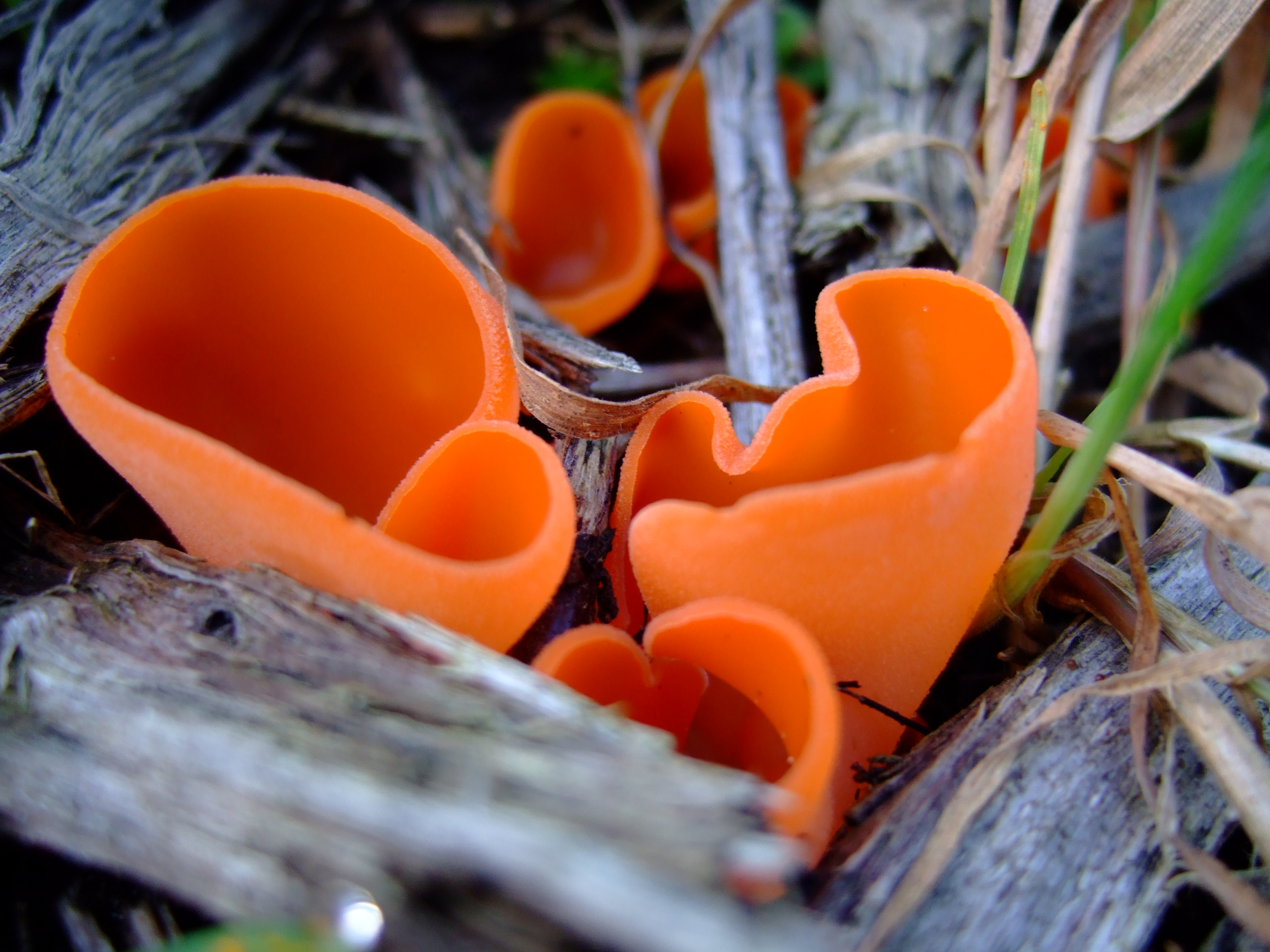

Scientific classification
- Domain: Eukaryota
- Kingdom: Fungi
- Division: Ascomycota
- Class: Pezizomycetes
- Order: Pezizales
- Family: Pyronemataceae
- Genus: Aleuria; Fuckel (1870)

Type species
- Aleuria aurantia (Pers.) Fuckel (1870)

= Aleuria =

Genus of fungi

Aleuria is a genus of cup fungi within the phylum Ascomycota. The best known species is Orange peel fungus, A. aurantia.

Aleuria species are saprobes.

== Description ==
- This genus is distinguished by the lack of gills, and epigeous nature.
- The ascospores are distinctly reticulate.
- Species are typically (but not always) bright in color.
- ascocarps are typically over 1 cm in diameter.

== Species ==
- Aleuria alpina
- Aleuria amplissima
- Aleuria applanata
- Aleuria ascophanoides
- Aleuria aurantia
- Aleuria balfour-browneae
- Aleuria boudieri
- Aleuria carbonicola
- Aleuria cestrica
- Aleuria crassa
- Aleuria crassiuscula
- Aleuria crucibulum
- Aleuria dalhousiensis
- Aleuria exigua
- Aleuria gigantea
- Aleuria gonnermannii
- Aleuria ingrica
- Aleuria isochroa
- Aleuria latispora
- Aleuria lloydiana
- Aleuria luteonitens
- Aleuria marchica
- Aleuria medogensis
- Aleuria mellea
- Aleuria membranacea
- Aleuria mespiliformis
- Aleuria michiganensis
- Aleuria murreana
- Aleuria nemorosa
- Aleuria nucalis
- Aleuria ollula
- Aleuria pectinospora
- Aleuria phaeospora
- Aleuria reperta
- Aleuria riparia
- Aleuria saccardoi
- Aleuria splendens
- Aleuria sylvestris
- Aleuria tectipus
- Aleuria tuberculosa
