= Auguste François Marie Glaziou =

French landscaper and botanist

Auguste François Marie Glaziou (30 August 1828 – 30 March 1906) was a French landscape designer and botanist born in Lannion, Brittany.

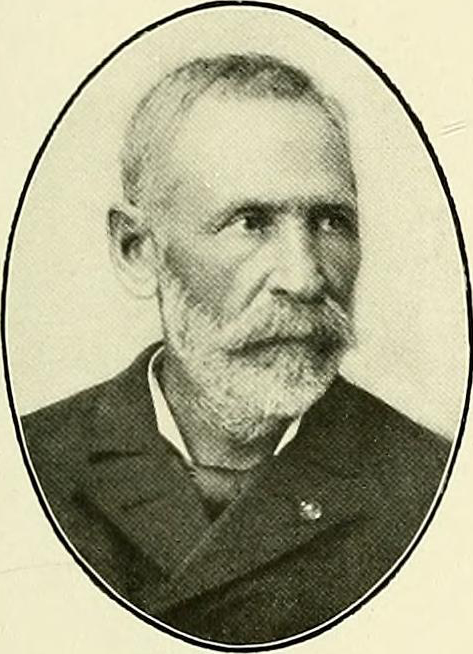
Auguste François Marie Glaziou

As a student in Paris, he earned a degree in civil engineering and took classes at the Muséum national d'histoire naturelle. In 1858 at the request of Emperor Dom Pedro II, he relocated to Rio de Janeiro as director of parks and gardens.

In Brazil, Glaziou was responsible for landscape design at several sites, including the gardens at Quinta da Boa Vista, the residence of Brazilian royalty for much of the 19th century. During his tenure in Brazil he also participated in widespread plant collecting. While in Brazil, he also engaged in the exploring the relatively unexplored territory, today known Brasilia, Brazil's capital.

In 1897 he returned to France and settled in Bordeaux, where he worked on his personal herbarium.

The genus Neoglaziovia and numerous botanical species are named after him, including Glaziellaceae (1869), which is a family of fungi in the order Pezizales that contains the single monotypic genus Glaziella. Also Bisglaziovia (1891) in the family Melastomataceae, and Glaziophyton (1889) in the family Poaceae.

He was co-author with Antoine Laurent Apollinaire Fée (1789-1874), of the two-volume Cryptogames vasculaire (Fougères, lycopodiacées, hydroptéridées, équisétacées) du Brésil (1869-1873).

== Other sources ==
- Biography
