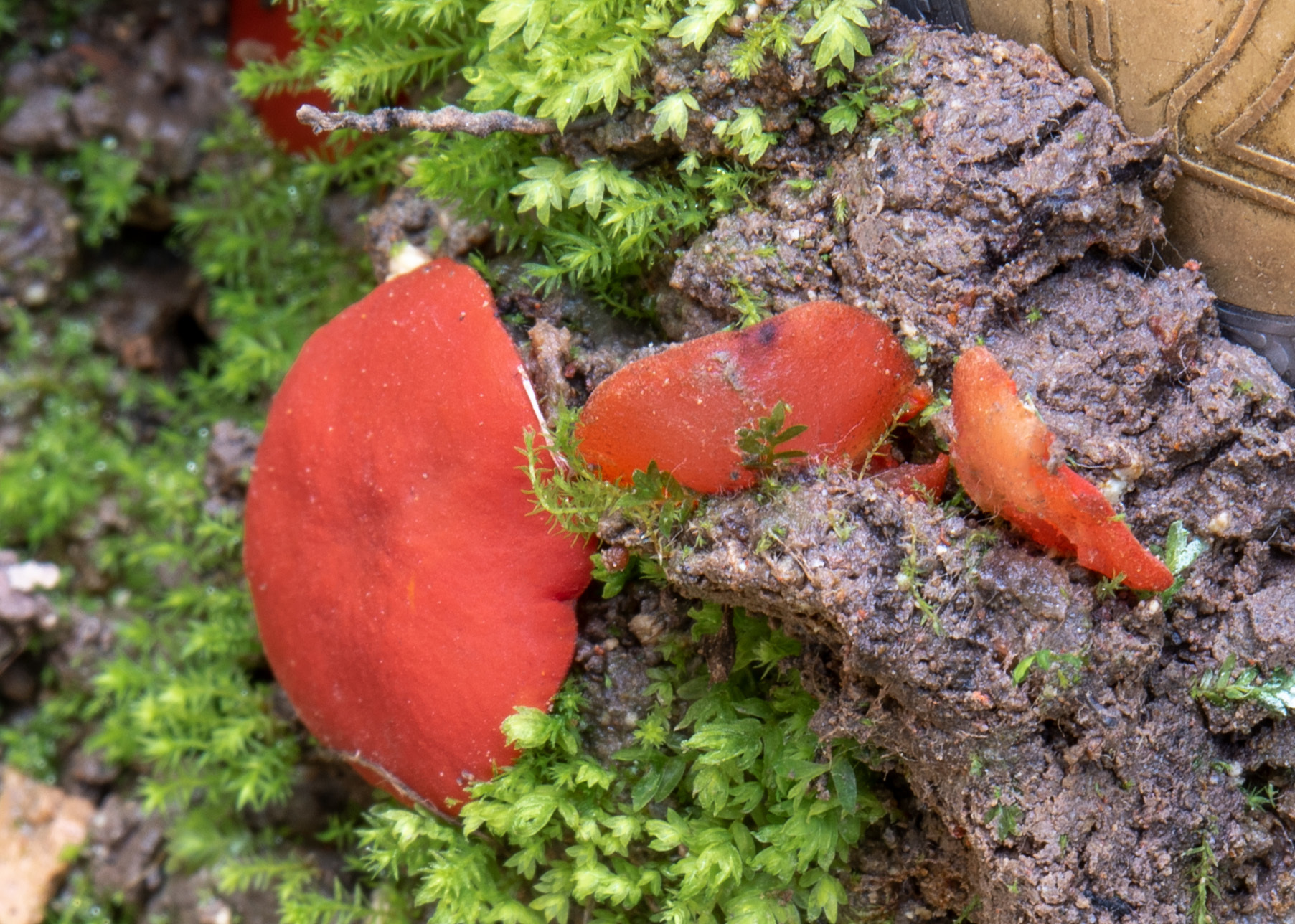
- Melastiza cornubiensis

Scientific classification
- Domain: Eukaryota
- Kingdom: Fungi
- Division: Ascomycota
- Class: Pezizomycetes
- Order: Pezizales
- Family: Pyronemataceae
- Genus: Melastiza
- Species: M. cornubiensis

Binomial name
- Melastiza cornubiensis Berk. & Broome, 1854

= Melastiza cornubiensis =

Species of fungus

Melastiza cornubiensis is a species of apothecial fungus belonging to the family Pyronemataceae.

This is a European species appearing from spring to autumn as bright orange-red disks clustered on sandy and gravelly soils.
