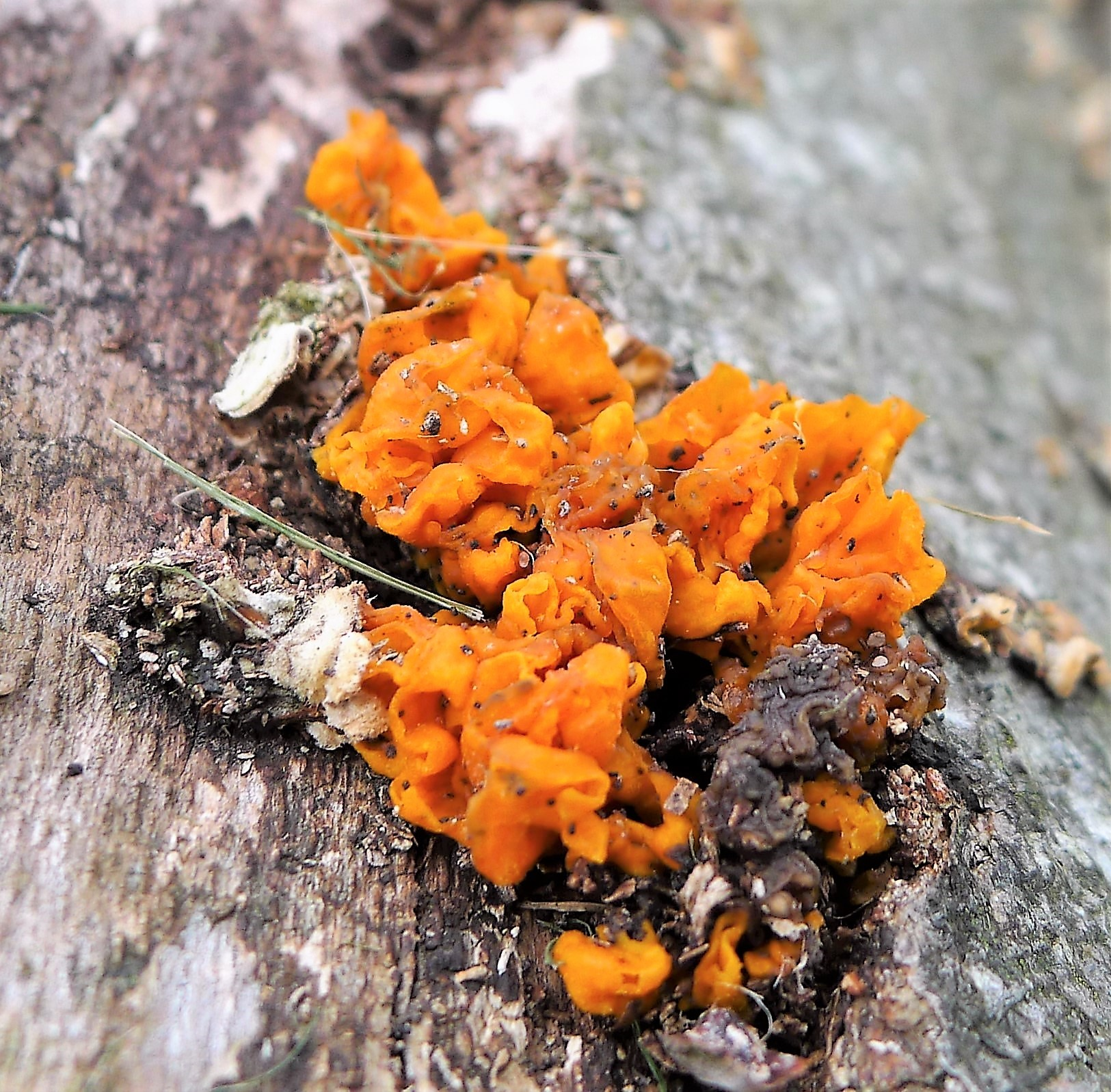
- Melastiza chateri

Scientific classification
- Kingdom: Fungi
- Division: Ascomycota
- Class: Pezizomycetes
- Order: Pezizales
- Family: Pyronemataceae
- Genus: Melastiza; Boud. (1885)

Type species
- Melastiza miniata (Fuckel) Boud. (1905)

Species include
- Melastiza chateri; Melastiza contorta; Melastiza cornubiensis; Melastiza flavorubens; Melastiza rozei; Melastiza scotica

= Melastiza =

Genus of fungi

Melastiza is a genus of fungi in the family Pyronemataceae.
