= O. concinna =

O. concinna may refer to:

- Oriens concinna, a skipper butterfly
- Orimarga concinna, a crane fly
- Otidea concinna, an apothecial fungus
