= Fungal fucose-specific lectin =

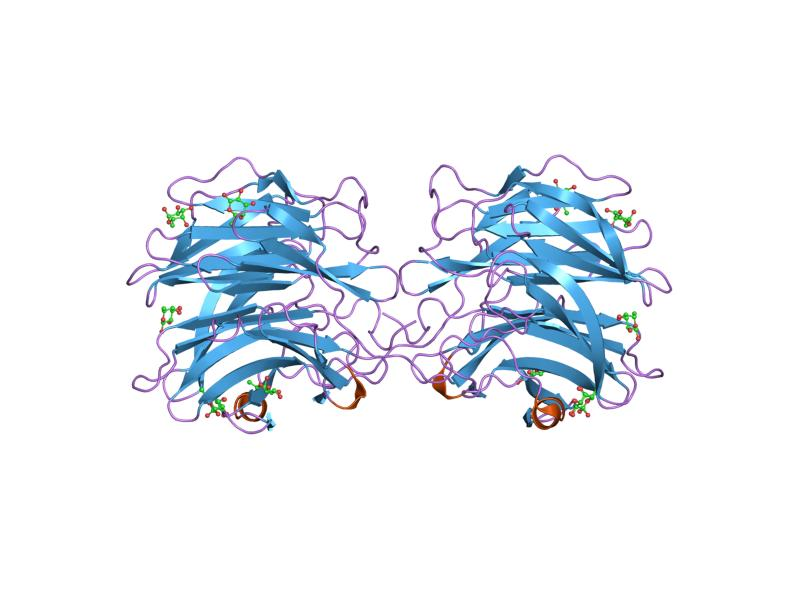
- crystal structure of fungal lectin: six-bladed beta-propeller fold and novel fucose recognition mode for aleuria aurantia lectin

Identifiers
- Symbol: Fungal_lectin
- Pfam: PF07938
- InterPro: IPR012475
- SCOP2: 1ofz / SCOPe / SUPFAM
Available protein structures:
- PDB: IPR012475 PF07938 (ECOD; PDBsum)
- AlphaFold: IPR012475; PF07938

In molecular biology, the fungal fucose-specific lectin family is a family of lectins. Lectins are proteins which are involved in many recognition events at the molecular or cellular level. These fungal lectins, such as Aleuria aurantia lectin AAL, specifically recognise fucosylated glycans. AAL is a dimeric protein, with each monomer being organised into a six-bladed beta-propeller fold and a small antiparallel two-stranded beta-sheet. The beta-propeller fold is important in fucose recognition; five binding pockets are found between the propeller blades. The small beta-sheet, on the other hand, is involved in the dimerisation process.
