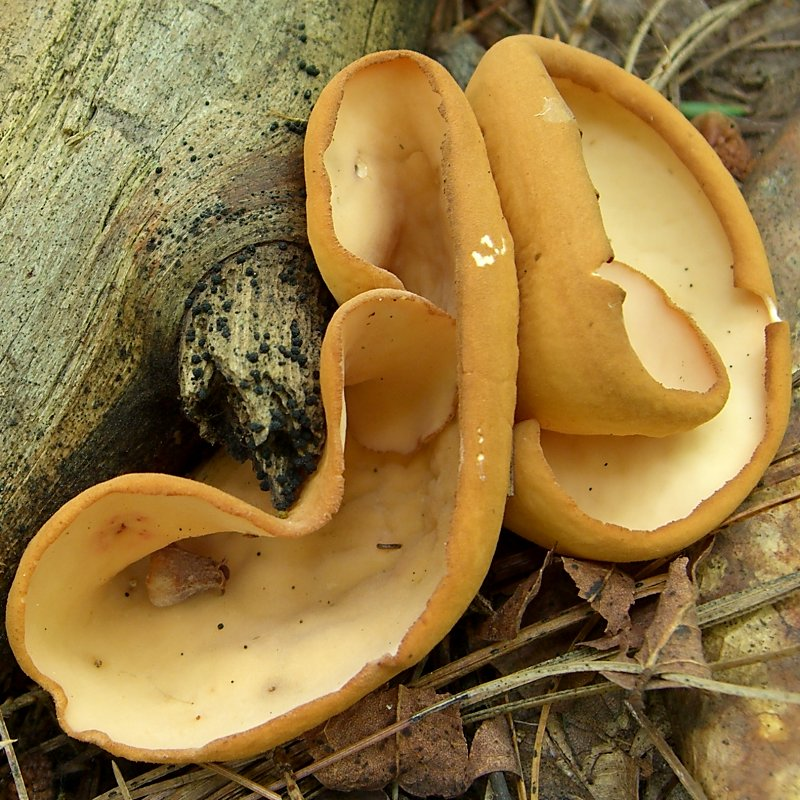

Scientific classification
- Kingdom: Fungi
- Division: Ascomycota
- Class: Pezizomycetes
- Order: Pezizales
- Family: Pyronemataceae
- Genus: Otidea
- Species: O. alutacea

Binomial name
- Otidea alutacea Pers., 1801

= Otidea alutacea =

Species of fungus

Otidea alutacea, commonly known as the brown clustered ear cup, is a species of apothecial fungus belonging to the family Pyronemataceae.

The cup is 3–6 cm tall and 2–4 cm wide, normally split on one side to the base, with a wavy margin, brown outside and light brown inside. The spores are colorless.

Similar species include Otidea onotica and Guepinia helvelloides.

It grows on soil in woodland in western North America and in Europe. It is inedible.

== Gallery ==
Otidea alutacea
- Mycological characteristics
- Smooth hymenium
- No distinct cap
- Hymenium attachment is irregular or not applicable
- Lacks a stipe
- Ecology is mycorrhizal
- Edibility is unknown

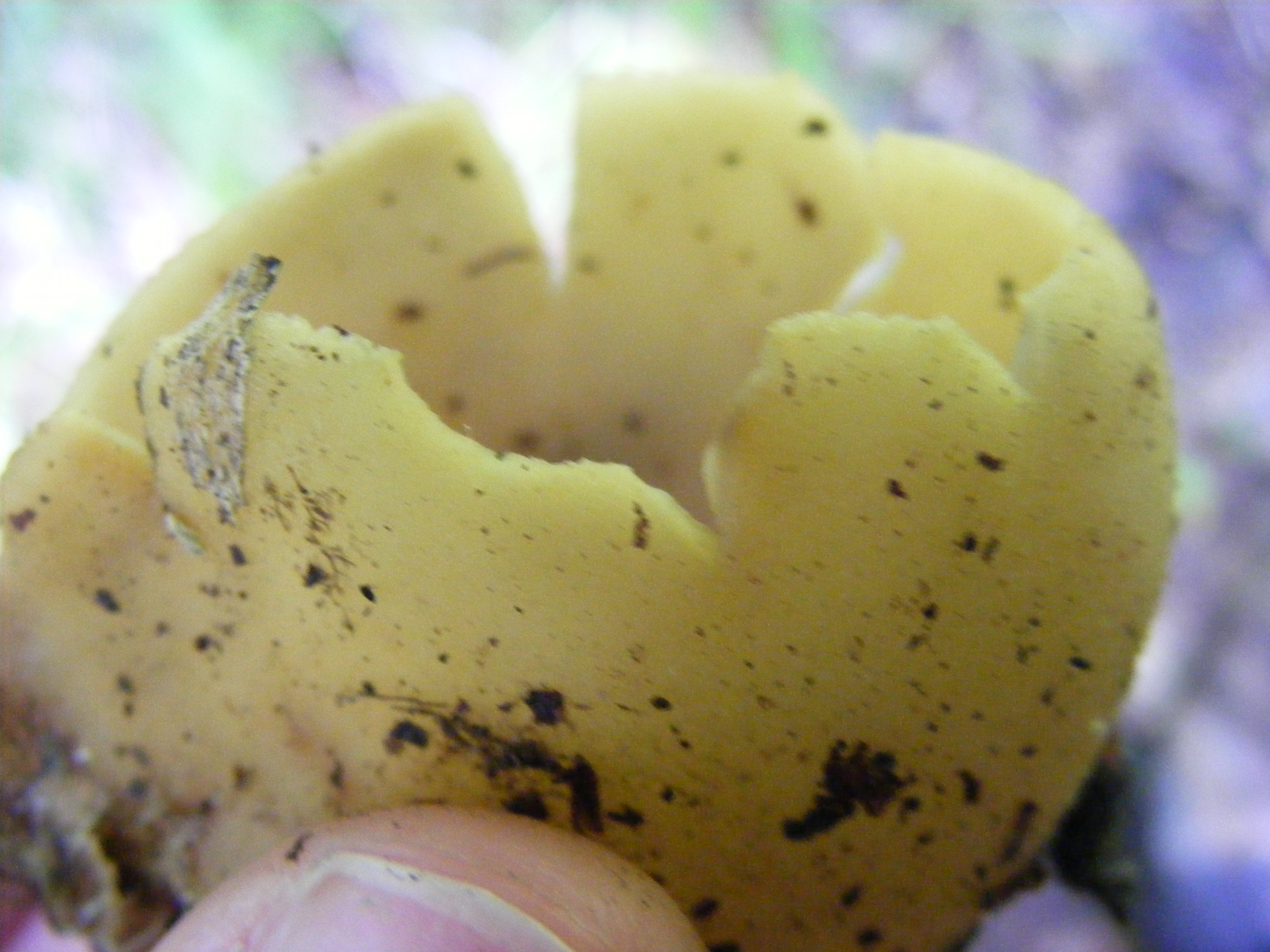

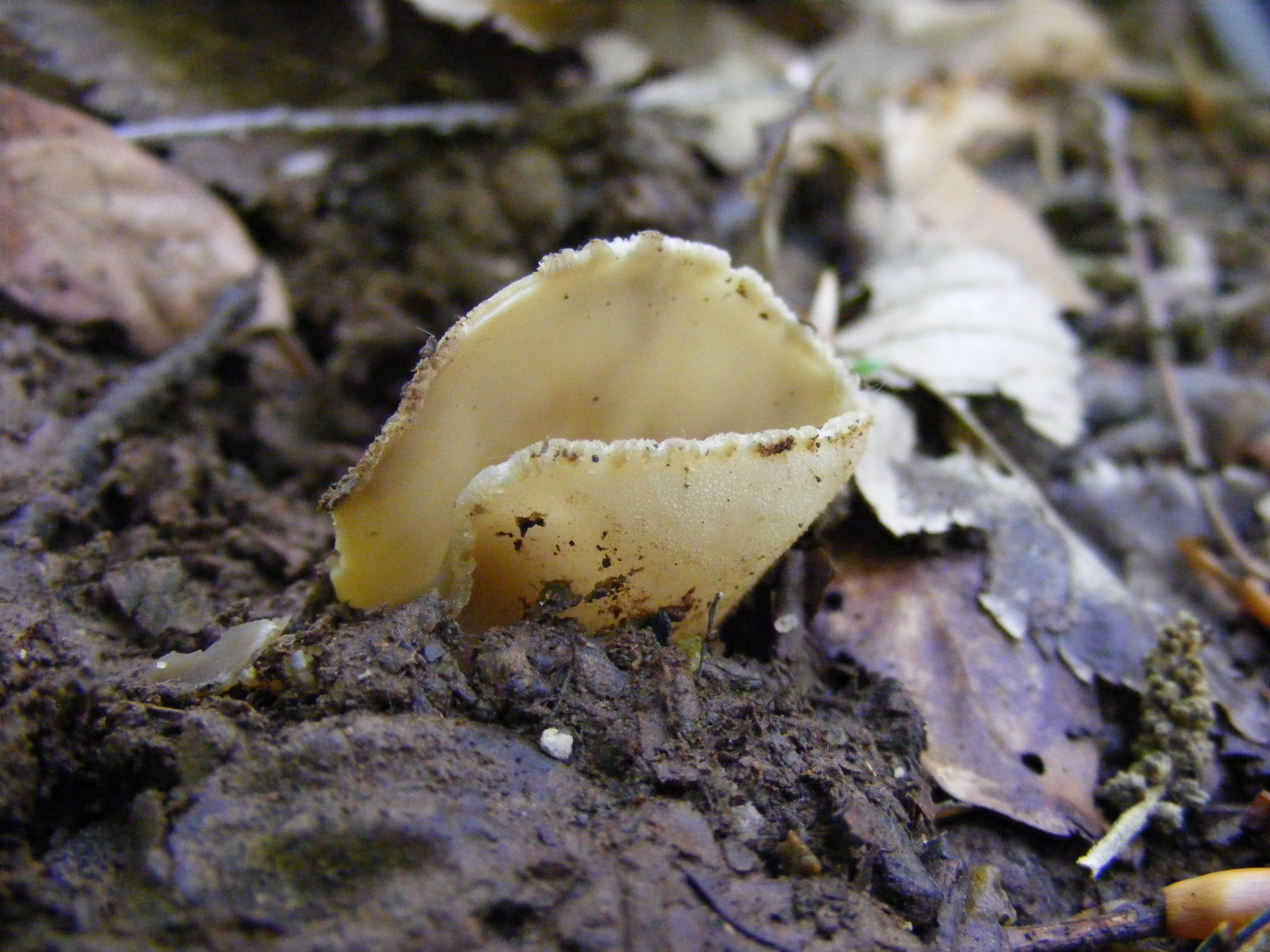

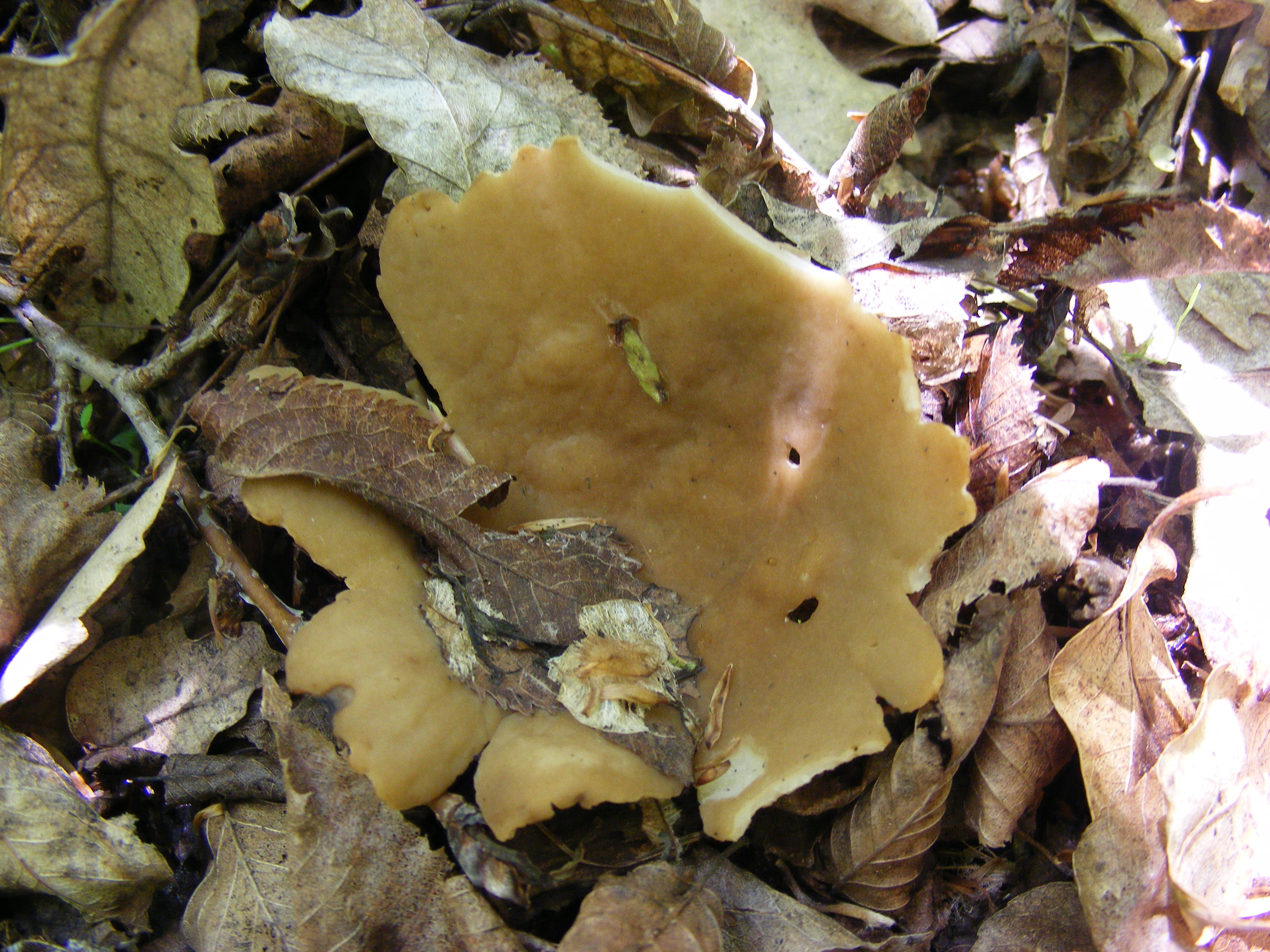

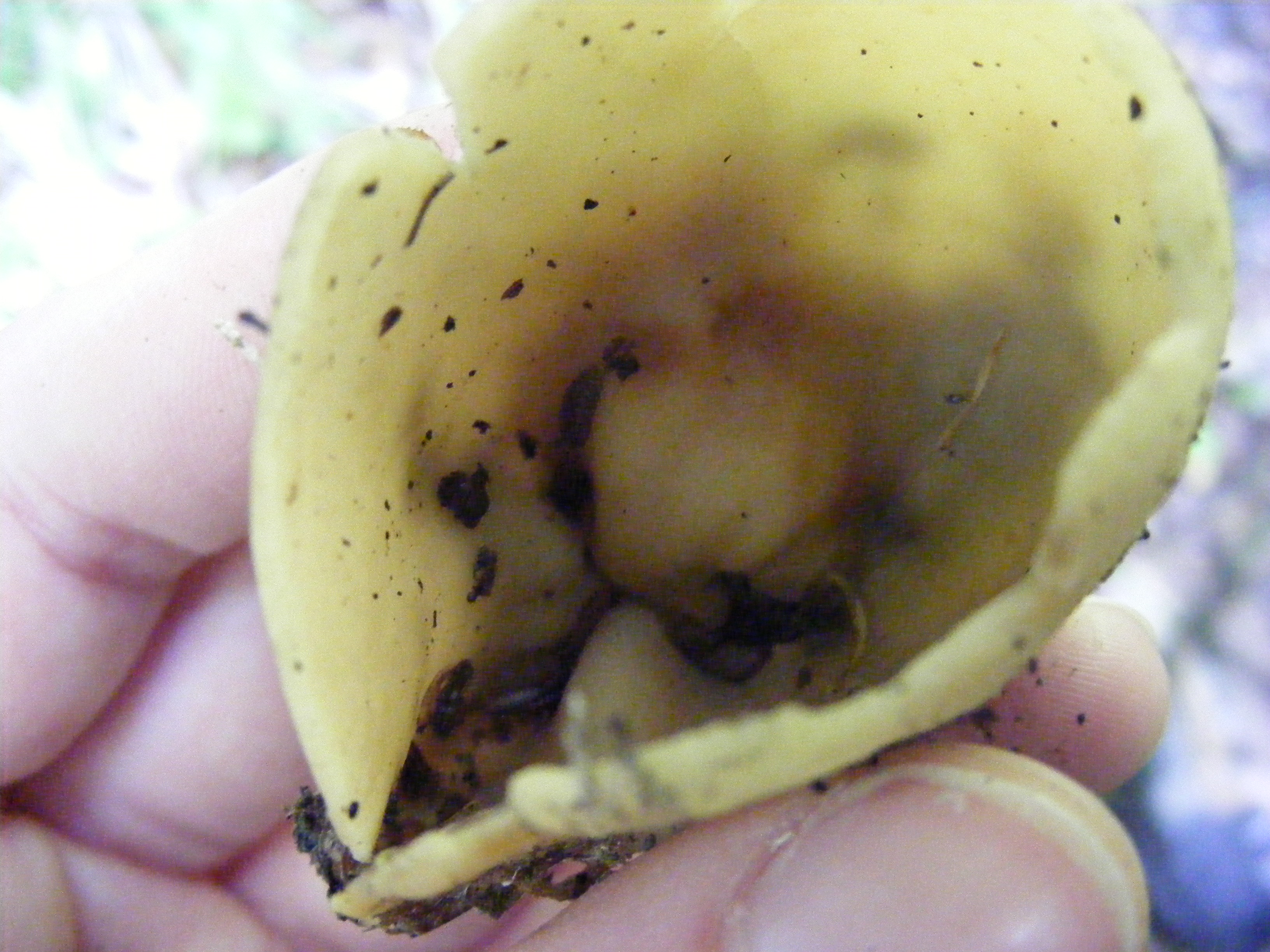

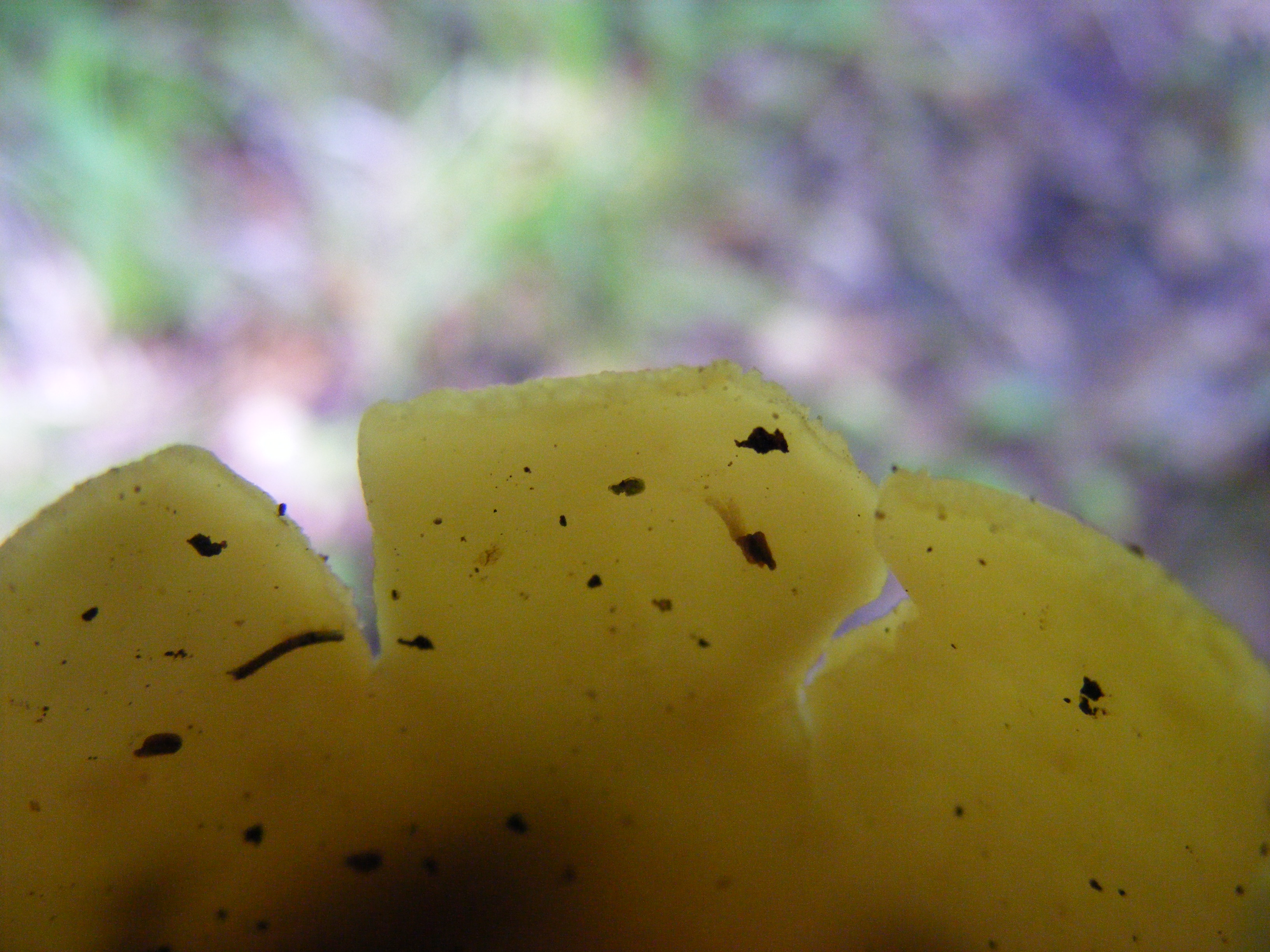

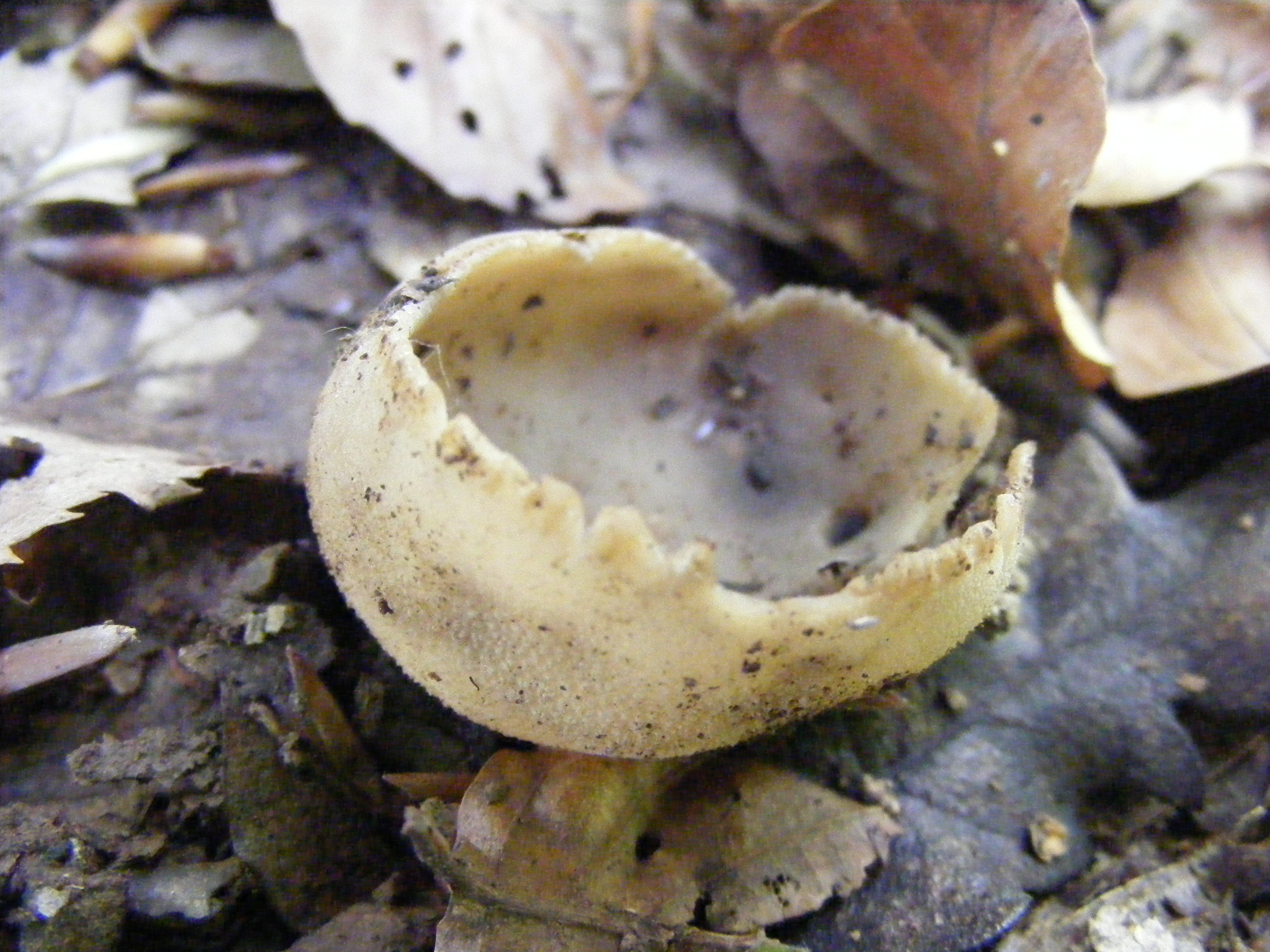

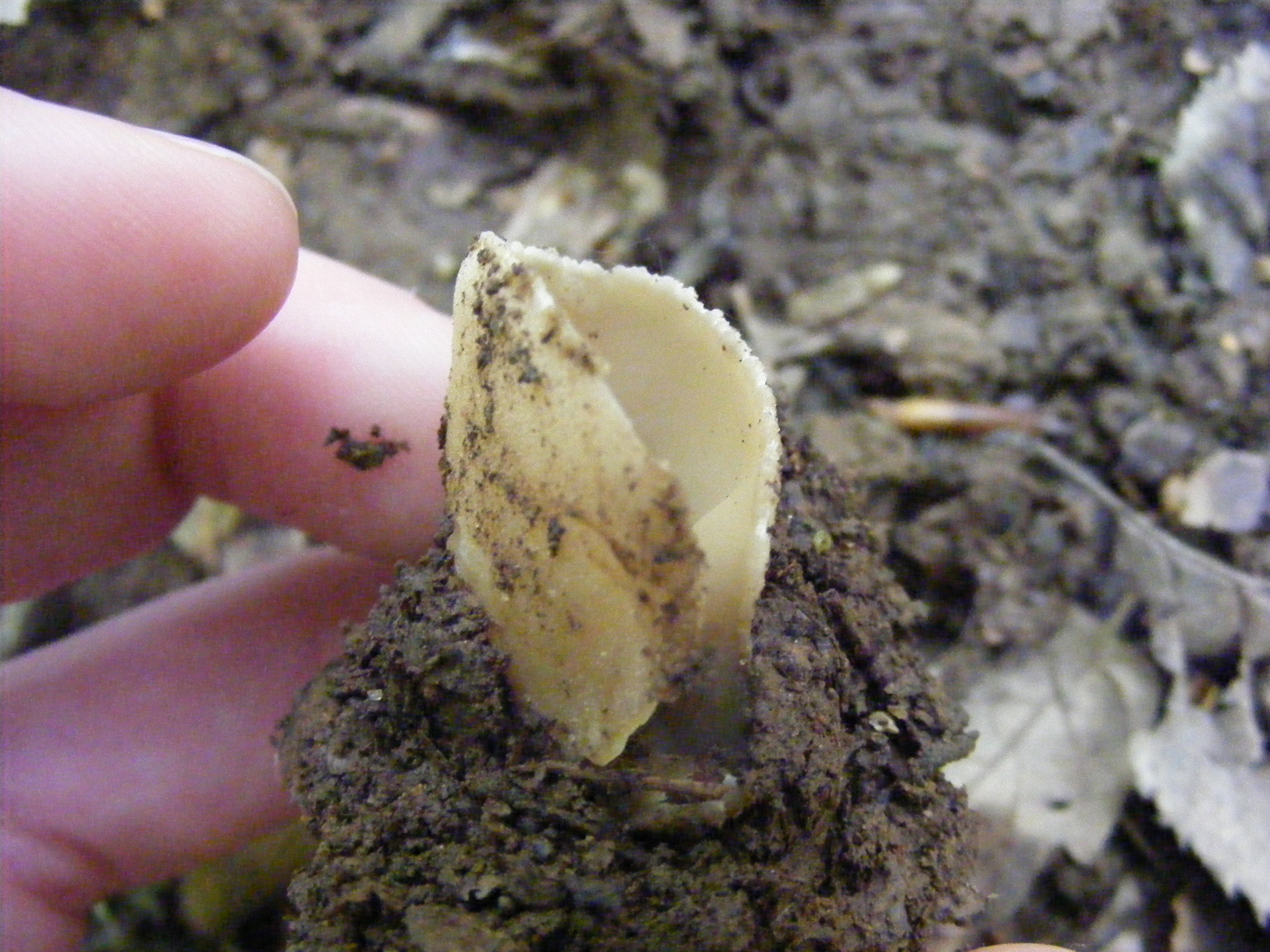

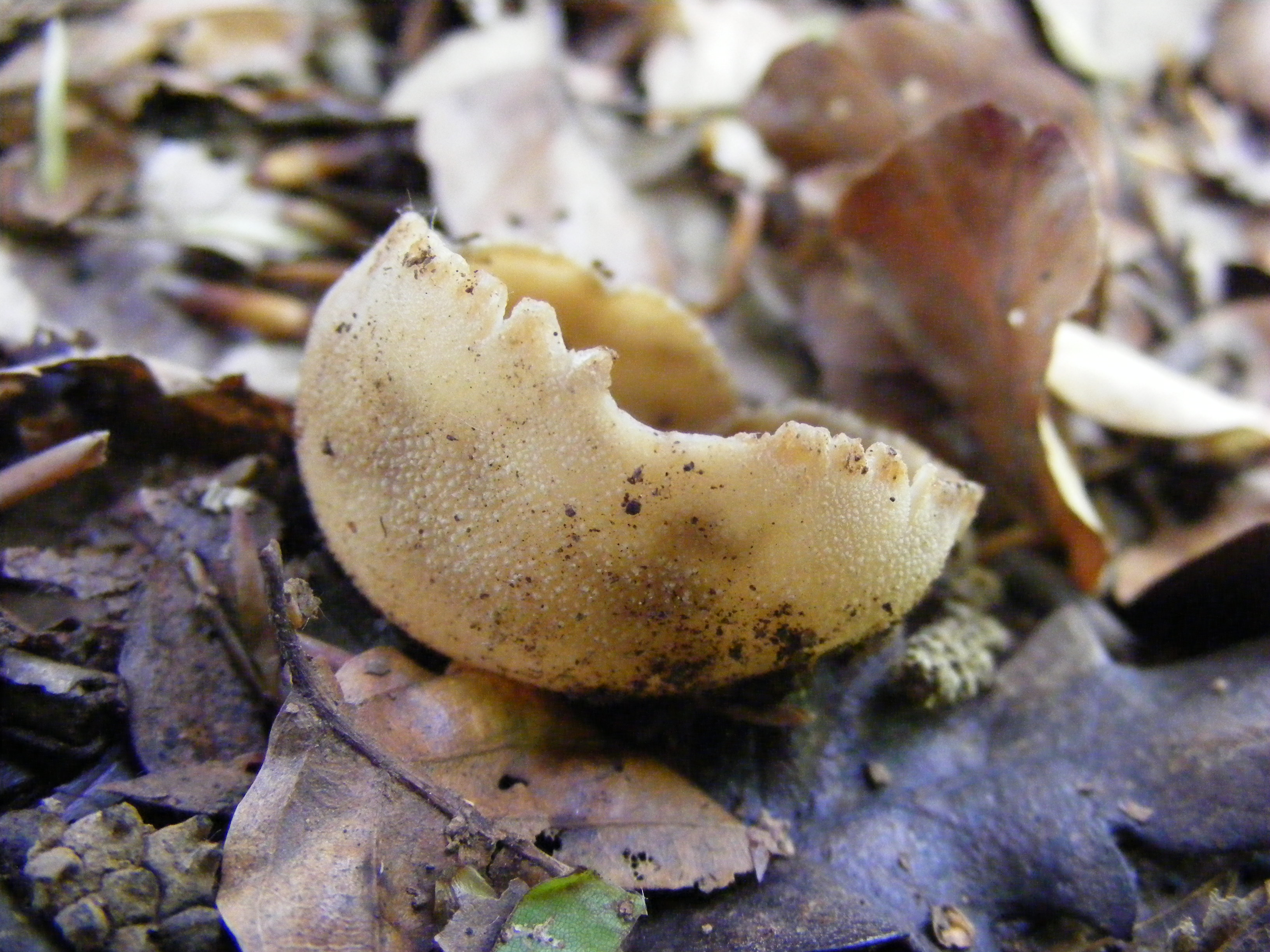

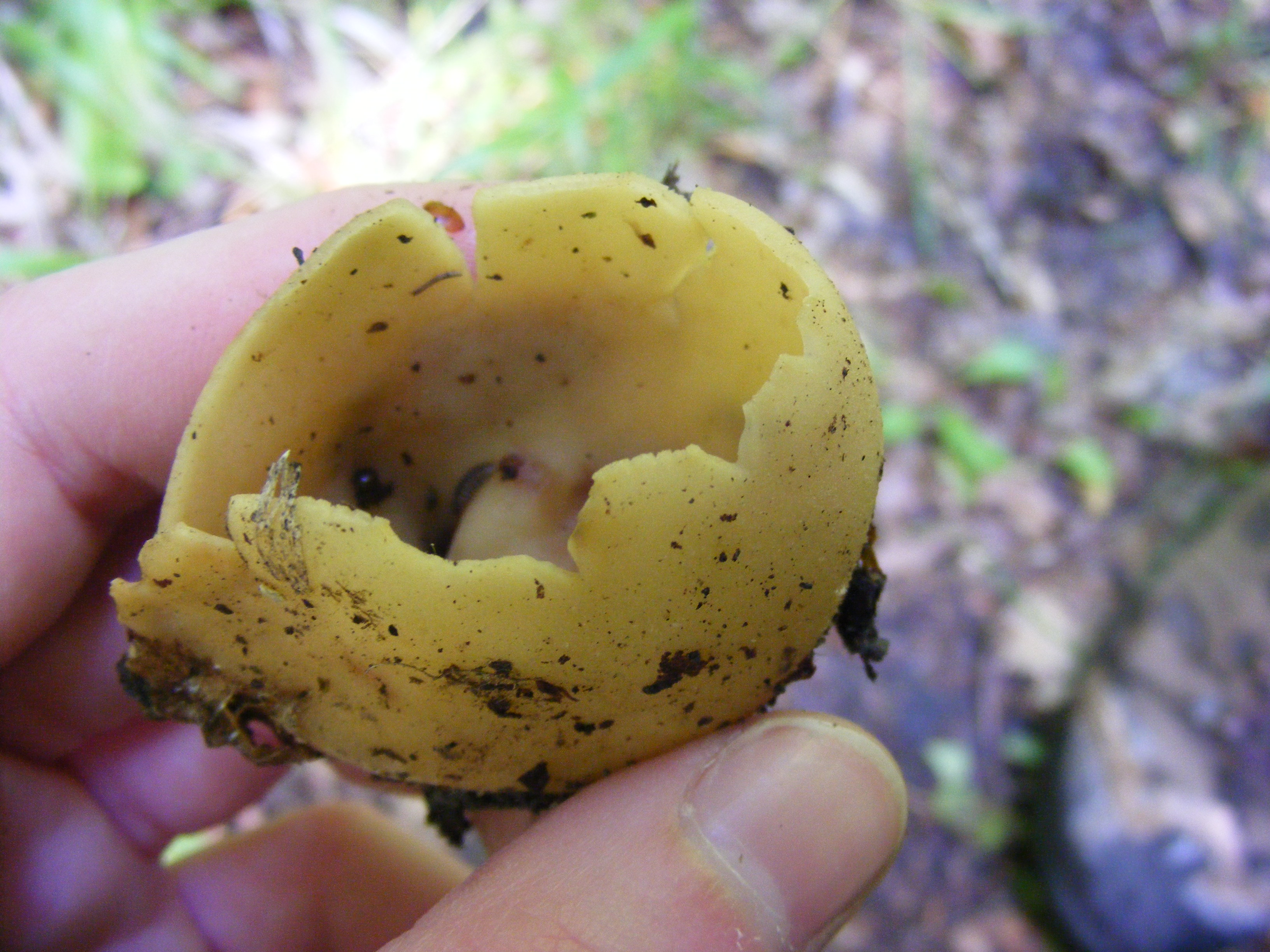
