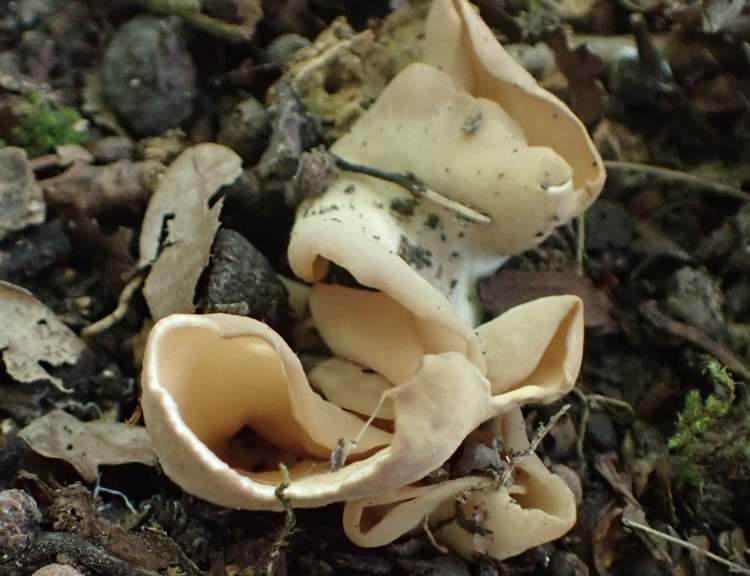

Scientific classification
- Kingdom: Fungi
- Division: Ascomycota
- Class: Pezizomycetes
- Order: Pezizales
- Family: Pyronemataceae
- Genus: Otidea
- Species: O. cochleata

Binomial name
- Otidea cochleata L.], 1753

= Otidea cochleata =

Species of fungus

Otidea cochleata is a species of apothecial fungus belonging to the family Pyronemataceae. This is a rare European species occurring singly or in small groups on soil in woodland. The fruiting body appears from spring to late autumn as a brown, irregularly shaped cup, split down one side, up to 5 cm high and the same across.
