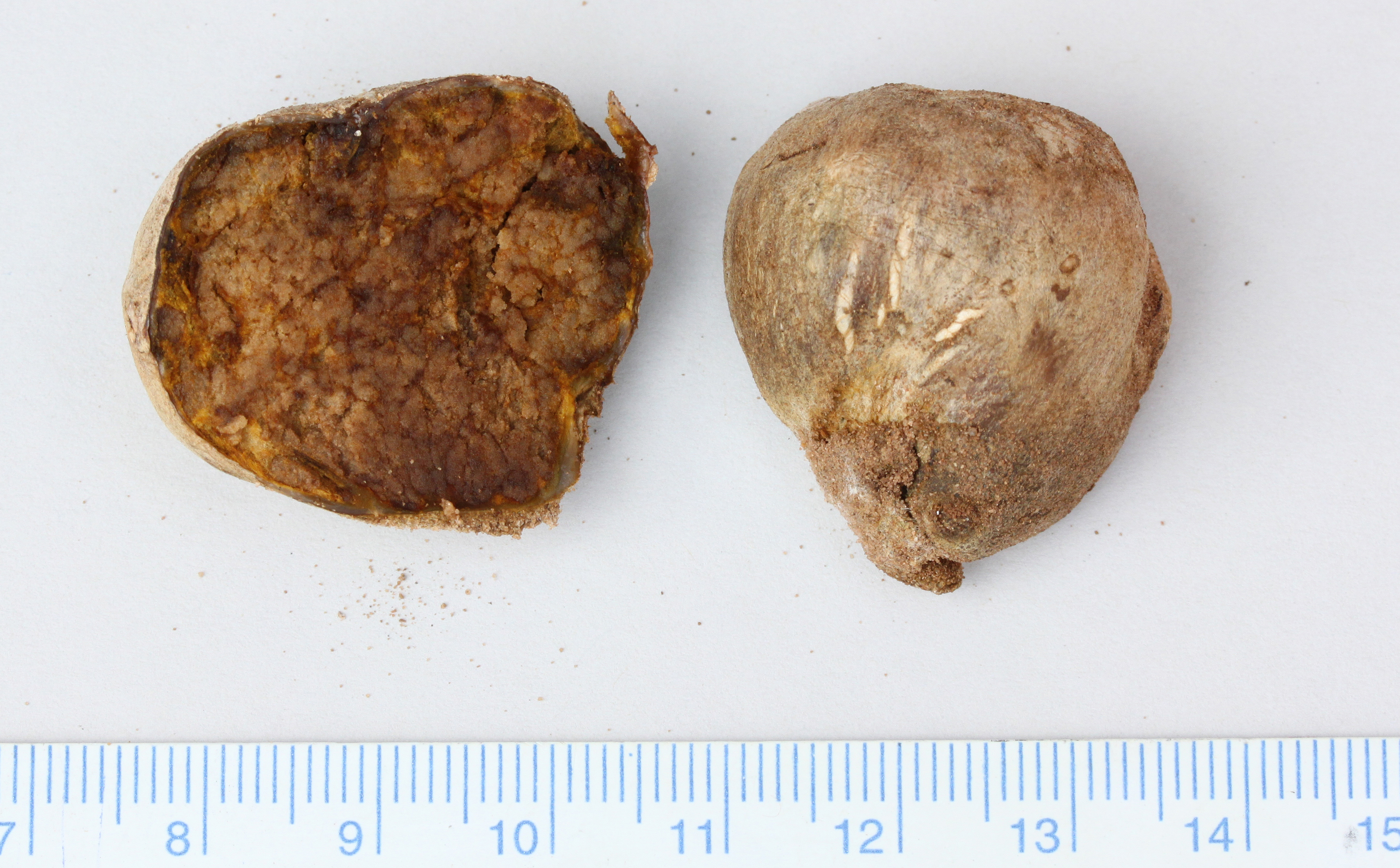
- Carbomyces sp. in New Mexico

Scientific classification
- Kingdom: Fungi
- Division: Ascomycota
- Class: Pezizomycetes
- Order: Pezizales
- Family: Carbomycetaceae; Trappe (1971)
- Genus: Carbomyces; Gilkey (1954)

Type species
- Carbomyces emergens Gilkey (1954)

Species
- Carbomyces emergens Carbomyces gilbertsoni Carbomyces longii

= Carbomyces =

Genus of fungi

The Carbomycetaceae are a family of fungi in the order Pezizales. The family contains the single genus Carbomyces, which in turn contains three species distributed in the United States and Mexico.
