= Glaziella =

Scientific classification
- Kingdom: Fungi
- Division: Ascomycota
- Class: Pezizomycetes
- Order: Pezizales
- Family: Glaziellaceae J.L.Gibson (1986)

Type genus
- Glaziella Berk. (1880)

Type species
- Glaziella vesiculosa Berk. (1880)

Family of fungi

Glaziellaceae is a family of fungi in the order Pezizales that contains the single monotypic genus Glaziella. The type species Glaziella vesiculosa, originally collected in Cuba, was referred to the genus Xylaria by Miles Joseph Berkeley and Moses Ashley Curtis in 1869. A decade later, Berkeley circumscribed the genus Glaziella to contain a specimen collected in Brazil, apparently forgetting that he had earlier named it Xylaria aurantiaca.

The genus name of Glaziella is in honour of Auguste François Marie Glaziou (1828 – 1906), who was a French landscape designer and botanist.
