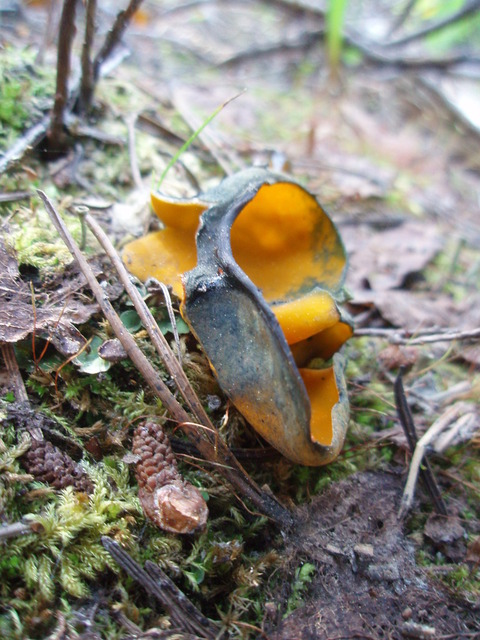
- Caloscypha fulgens

Scientific classification
- Kingdom: Fungi
- Division: Ascomycota
- Class: Pezizomycetes
- Order: Pezizales
- Family: Caloscyphaceae; Harmaja (2002)

Type genus
- Caloscypha Boud. (1885)

Genera
- Caloscypha; Kallistoskypha

= Caloscyphaceae =

Family of fungi

The Caloscyphaceae are a family of fungi in the order Pezizales. The family was circumscribed by Finnish mycologist Harri Harmaja in 2002. The genus Kallistoskypha was added in 2013 to accommodate the species formerly known as Caloscypha incarnata.
