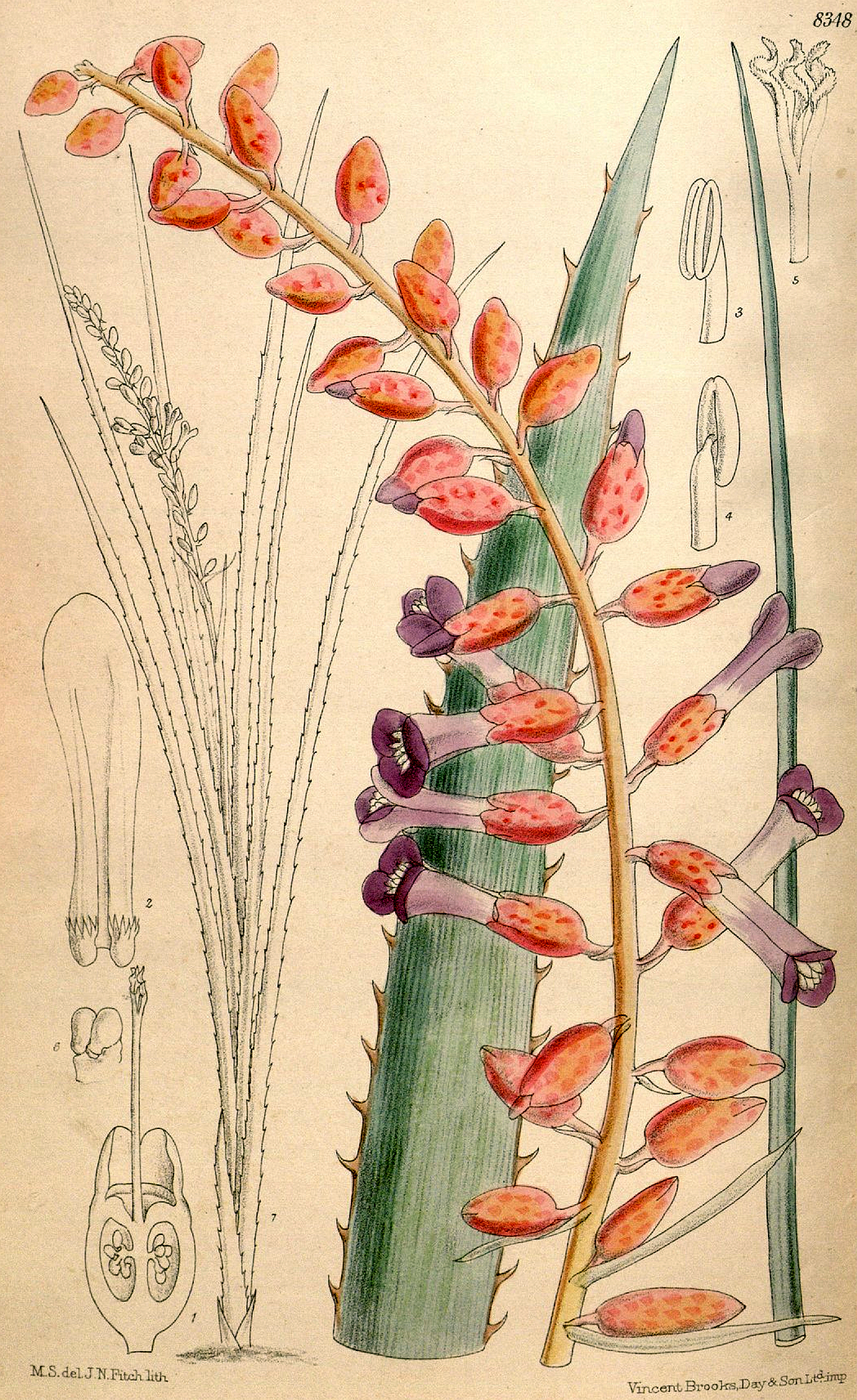
- Neoglaziovia concolor 1910 illustration

Scientific classification
- Kingdom: Plantae
- Clade: Embryophytes
- Clade: Tracheophytes
- Clade: Spermatophytes
- Clade: Angiosperms
- Clade: Monocots
- Clade: Commelinids
- Order: Poales
- Family: Bromeliaceae
- Subfamily: Bromelioideae
- Genus: Neoglaziovia; Mez

= Neoglaziovia =

Genus of flowering plants

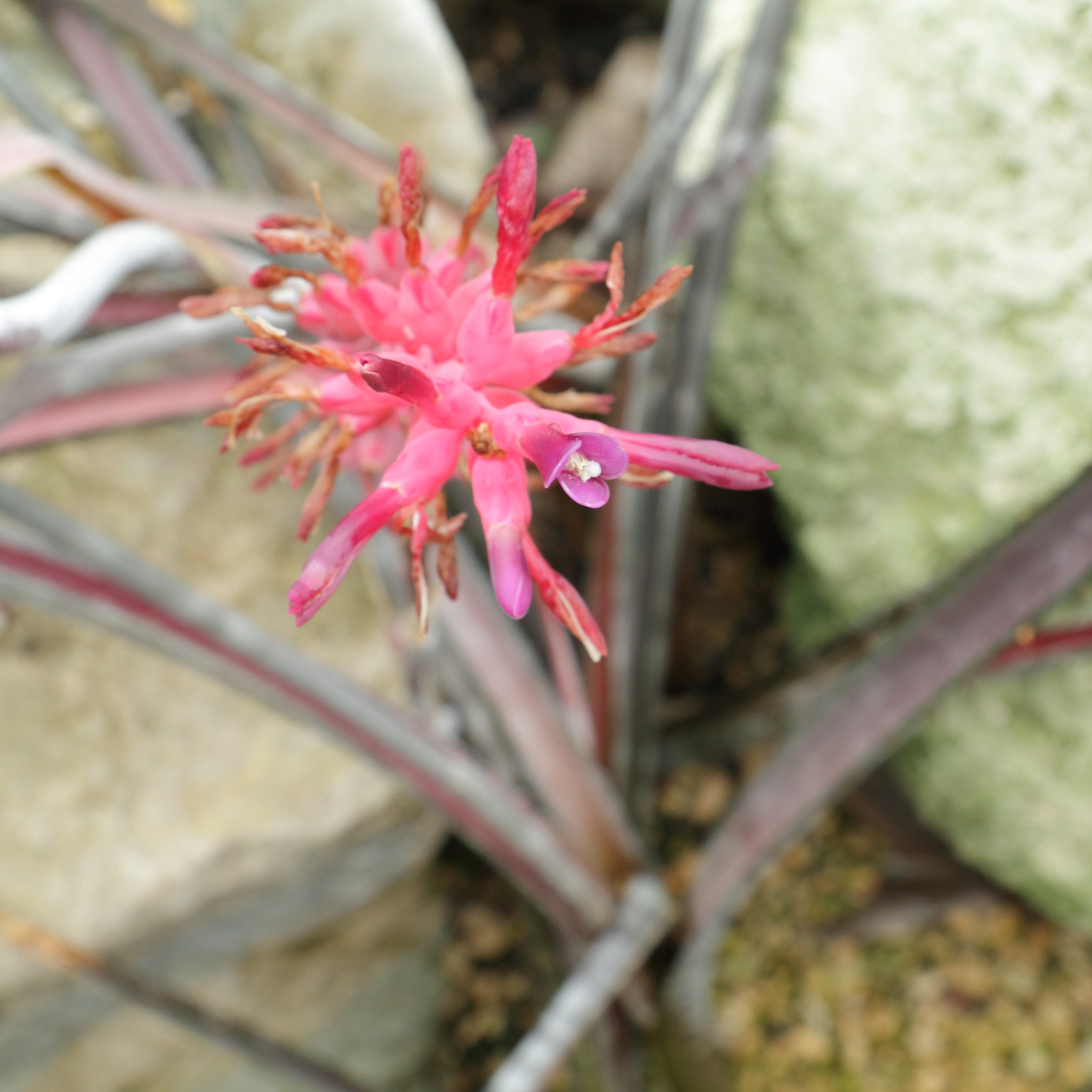
Neoglaziovia variegata in bloom.

Neoglaziovia is a genus in the plant family Bromeliaceae, subfamily Bromelioideae. The genus is named in honor of Auguste François Marie Glaziou, French landscape designer and bromeliad collector (1833-1906).

== Species ==
It has three known species, all endemic to the Atlantic Forest biome (Mata Atlantica Brasileira) in southeast Brazil.

- Neoglaziovia burle-marxii Leme — endemic to Bahia state. Named for Roberto Burle Marx (1904-1994), a renowned Brazilian artist, botanist, garden designer, and native flora collector/plantsman.
- Neoglaziovia concolor C.H. Wright — endemic to Bahia state
- Neoglaziovia variegata (Arruda da Camara) Mez — native to states of Bahia, Ceará, Minas Gerais, Paraíba, Piauí, and Rio Grande do Norte.

== Cultivation and uses ==
Neoglaziovia variegata has been, and continues to be, an important part of localized markets in South America — where its fibers are woven into fabric, netting, and rope.
