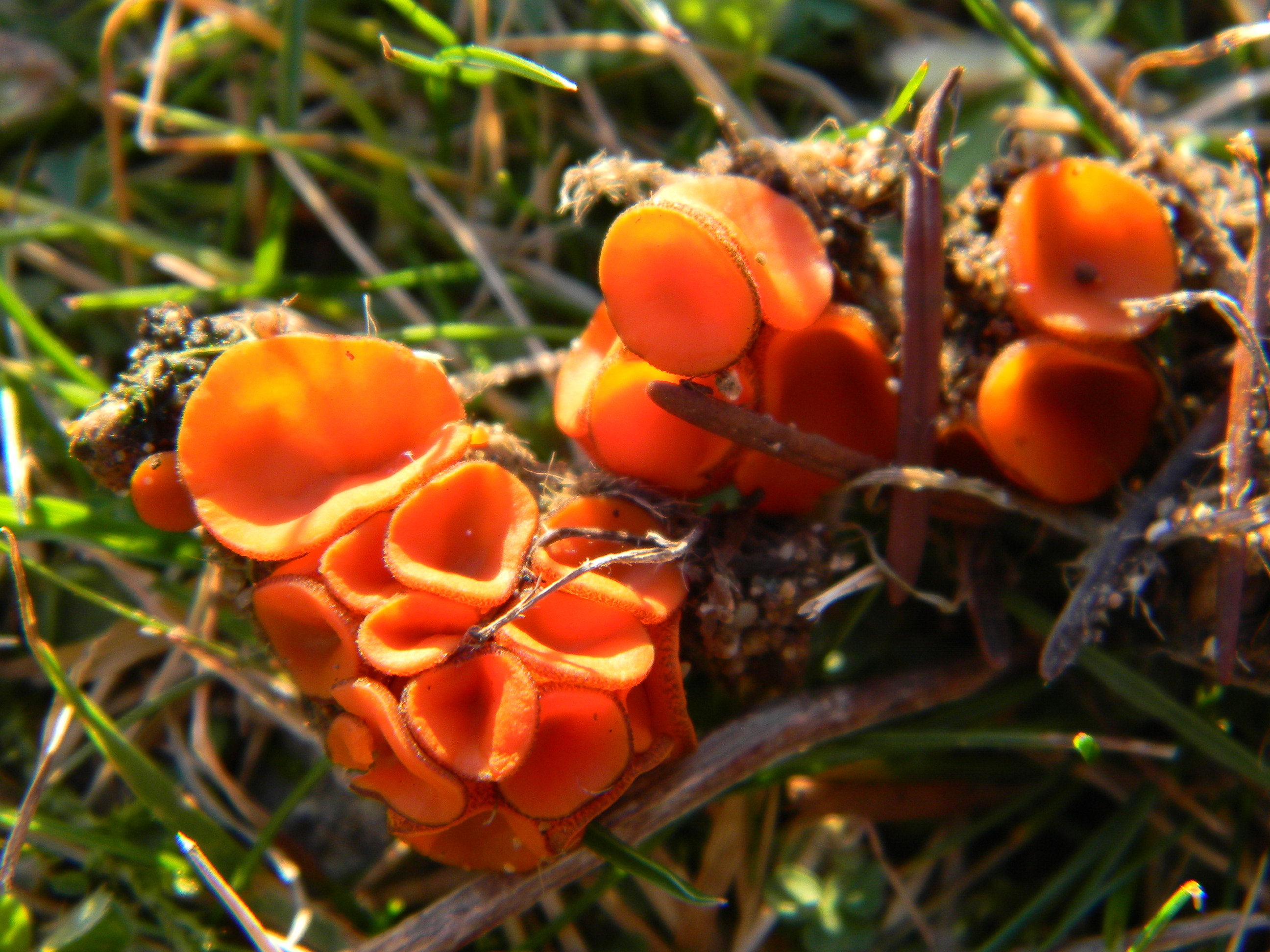

Scientific classification
- Domain: Eukaryota
- Kingdom: Fungi
- Division: Ascomycota
- Class: Pezizomycetes
- Order: Pezizales
- Family: Pyronemataceae
- Genus: Melastiza
- Species: M. chateri

Binomial name
- Melastiza chateri W.G. Sm., 1872

= Melastiza chateri =

Species of fungus

Melastiza chateri is a species of apothecial fungus belonging to the family Pyronemataceae.

This European species appears all year as smooth, dull orange-red disks up to 15 mm in diameter on damp sandy soil.
