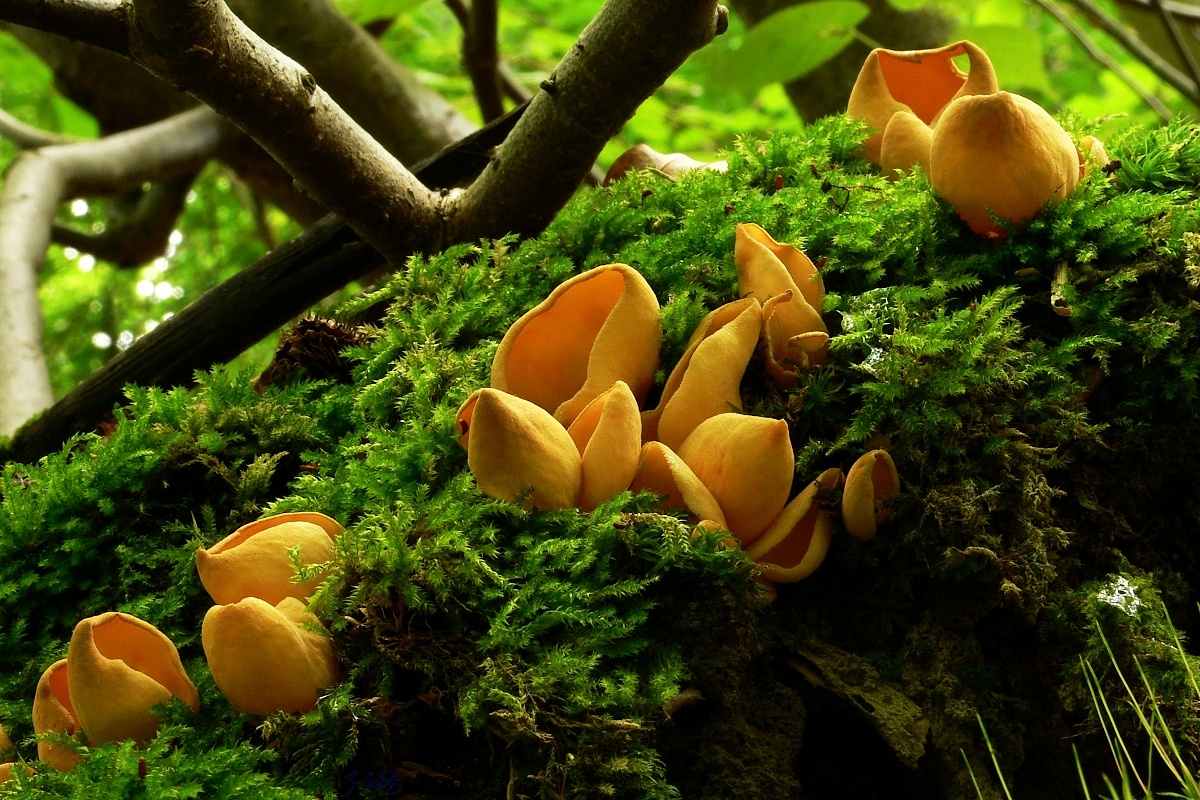

Scientific classification
- Kingdom: Fungi
- Division: Ascomycota
- Class: Pezizomycetes
- Order: Pezizales
- Family: Pyronemataceae
- Genus: Otidea
- Species: O. onotica

Binomial name
- Otidea onotica (Pers.) Fuckel, 1870

Synonyms
- Peziza onotica Pers. 1801

= Otidea onotica =

Species of fungus

Otidea onotica, commonly known as hare's ear or donkey ear, is a species of apothecial fungus belonging to the family Pyronemataceae.

The fruiting body appears from spring to early autumn as a deep cup split down one side and elongated at the other, up to 10 centimetres (4 inches) tall. It is yellow to orangish or slightly pinkish. White hairs cover the outside, while the inside is smooth or rippled.

Similar species include Guepinia helvelloides, others of the genus Otidea, as well as some of Pezizaceae family.

Otidea onotica occurs in Europe and North America, singly or in small groups on the soil of deciduous woodland, most often with beech trees.

Although some have listed it as edible, according to one study it contains the toxin monomethylhydrazine.
