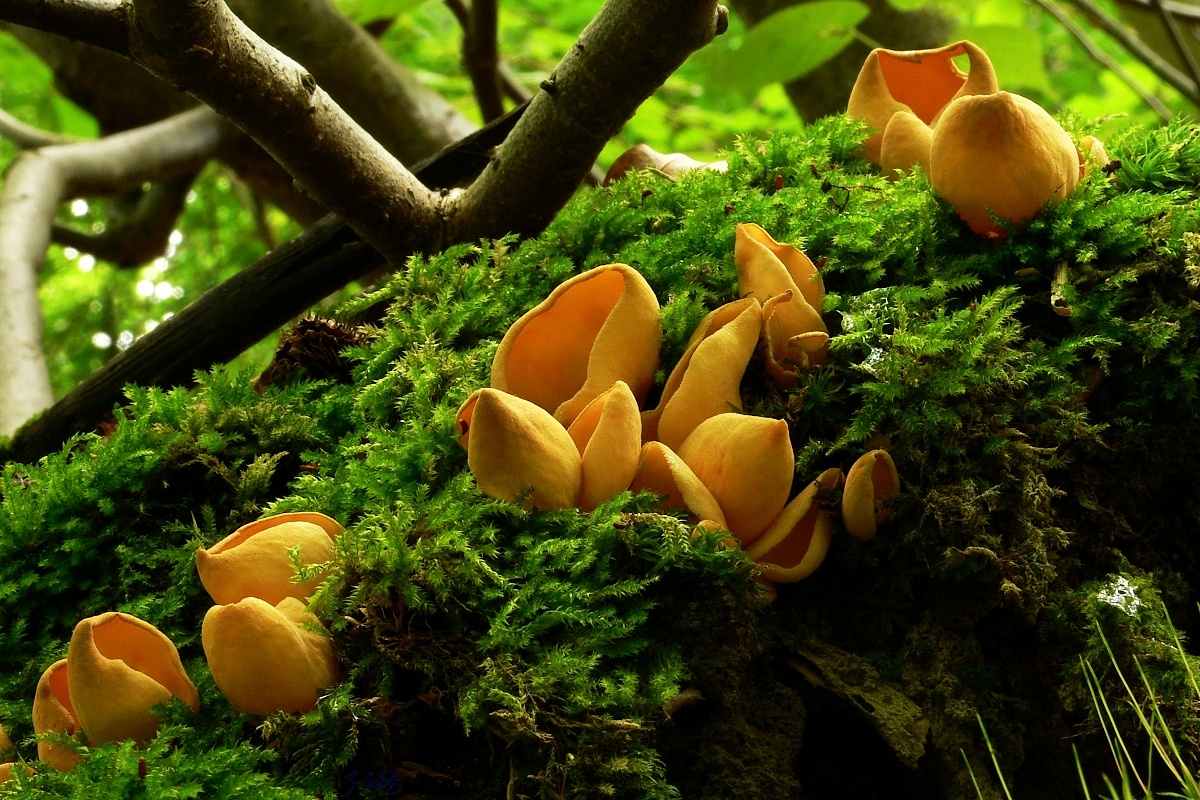
- Otidea onotica

Scientific classification
- Domain: Eukaryota
- Kingdom: Fungi
- Division: Ascomycota
- Class: Pezizomycetes
- Order: Pezizales
- Family: Pyronemataceae
- Genus: Otidea (Pers.) Bonord. (1851)

Type species
- Otidea onotica (Pers.) Fuckel (1870)

Synonyms
- Peziza subgen. Cochlearia Cooke (1879); Otidea subgen. Pseudotis Boud. (1885); Cochlearia (Cooke) Lambotte (1888); Pseudotis (Boud.) Boud. (1907); Flavoscypha Harmaja (1974)

= Otidea =

Genus of fungi

Otidea is a genus of fungi in the family Pyronemataceae. The genus is widely distributed in northern temperate regions.

== Taxonomy ==
The genus, proposed in 1851 by German physician and mycologist Hermann Friedrich Bonorden, was based on Christiaan Hendrik Persoon's 1822 Peziza Otidea. Otidea is probably derived from the Greek words οϋς (ous), gen. ώτός (otos), meaning "ear", referring to the fruitbody shape of some species.

== Selected species ==
As of August 2015, Index Fungorum lists 46 valid species of Otidea:

- Otidea alba Velen. 1934
- Otidea alutacea (Pers.) Massee 1895
- Otidea angusta Harmaja 2009
- Otidea apophysata (Cooke & W.Phillips) Sacc. 1889
- Otidea bicolor W.Y.Zhuang & Zhu L.Yang 2010 – China
- Otidea bufonia (Pers.) Boud. 1907
- Otidea caeruleopruinosa Harmaja 2009
- Otidea cinerascens Velen. 1947
- Otidea cochleata (L.) Fuckel 1870
- Otidea crassa W.Y.Zhuang 2006 – China
- Otidea daliensis W.Y.Zhuang & Korf 1989 – China
- Otidea flavidobrunneola Harmaja 2009
- Otidea formicarum Harmaja 1976
- Otidea fuckelii M.Carbone & Van Vooren 2010
- Otidea grandis (Pers.) Rehm 1893
- Otidea harperiana Rehm 1904
- Otidea indivisa Velen. 1934
- Otidea kauffmanii Kanouse 1950
- Otidea kunmingensis W.Y.Zhuang 2008
- Otidea lactea J.Z.Cao & L.Fan 1990
- Otidea leporina (Batsch) Fuckel 1870
- Otidea lilacina R.Heim & L.Remy 1932
- Otidea lobata Rodway 1925 – Australia
- Otidea microspora (Kanouse) Harmaja 1976
- Otidea mirabilis Bolognini & Jamoni 2001
- Otidea myosotis Harmaja 1976
- Otidea nannfeldtii Harmaja 1976
- Otidea ochracea (Fr.) Seaver 1904
- Otidea olivaceobrunnea Harmaja 2009
- Otidea onotica (Pers.) Fuckel 1870
- Otidea papillata Harmaja 1976
- Otidea pedunculata Velen. 1934
- Otidea platyspora Nannf. 1966
- Otidea propinquata (P.Karst.) Harmaja 1976
- Otidea purpurea (M.Zang) Korf & W.Y.Zhuang 1985
- Otidea pusilla Rahm 1958
- Otidea rainierensis Kanouse 1950
- Otidea reisneri Velen. 1922
- Otidea sinensis J.Z.Cao & L.Fan 1990 – China
- Otidea smithii Kanouse 1939
- Otidea subpurpurea W.Y.Zhuang 2008
- Otidea subterranea
- Otidea tasmanica Rodway 1925 – Australia
- Otidea tianshuiensis J.Z.Cao, L.Fan & B.Liu 1990
- Otidea tuomikoskii Harmaja 1976
- Otidea violacea A.L.Sm. & Ramsb. 1916
- Otidea yunnanensis (B.Liu & J.Z.Cao) W.Y.Zhuang & C.Y.Liu 2006
