= Bisglaziovia =

Scientific classification
- Kingdom: Plantae
- Clade: Tracheophytes
- Clade: Angiosperms
- Clade: Eudicots
- Clade: Rosids
- Order: Myrtales
- Family: Melastomataceae
- Genus: Bisglaziovia; Cogn.

Genus of flowering plants

Bisglaziovia is a genus of flowering plants belonging to the family Melastomataceae.

Its native range is Southeastern Brazil.

Species:

- Bisglaziovia behurioides Cogn.
