= Karl Wilhelm Gottlieb Leopold Fuckel =

German botanist (1821–1876)

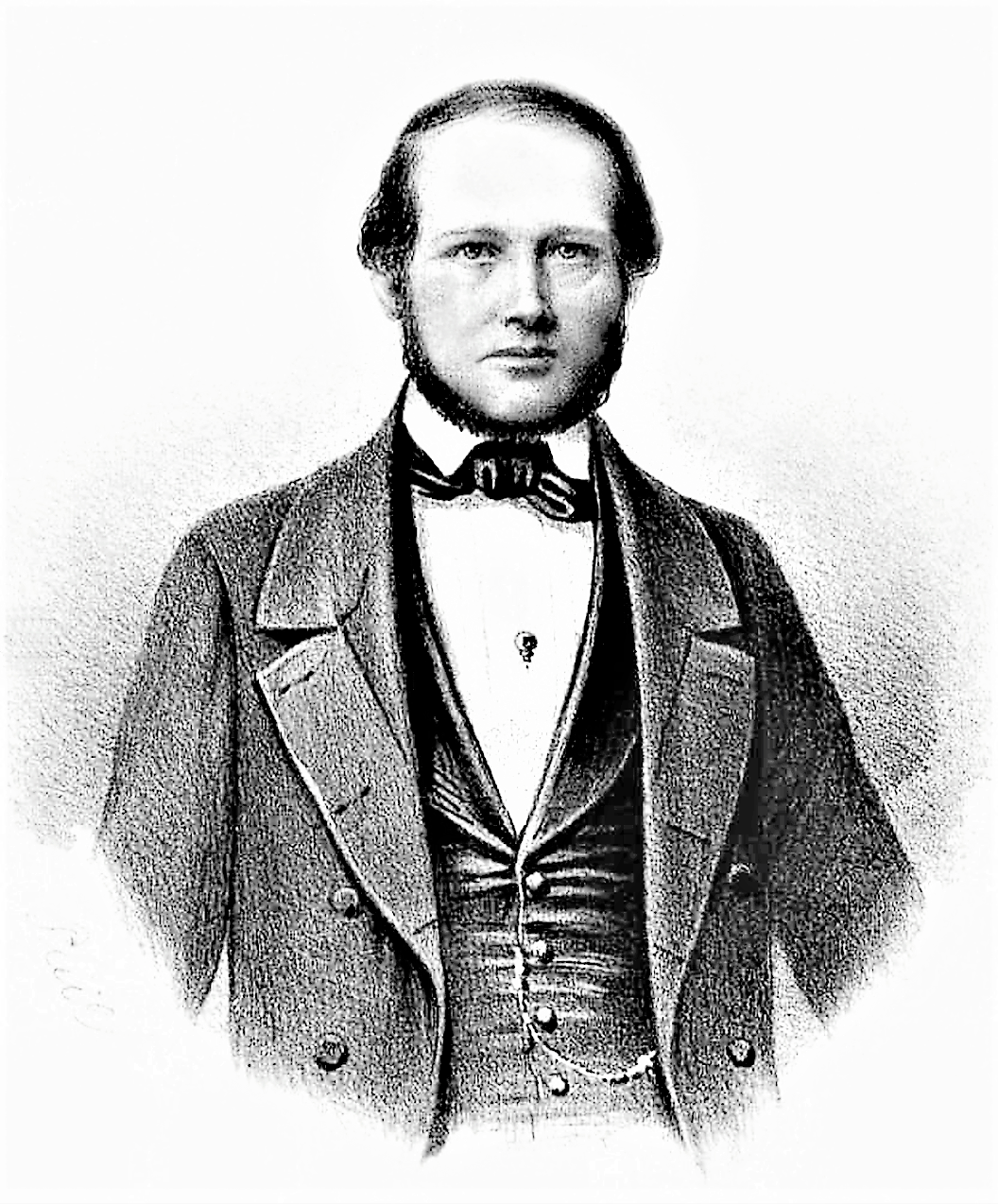
- Born: 3 February 1821; Reichelsheim
- Died: 8 May 1876 (aged 55); Vienna
- Scientific career
- Fields: Botany
- Author abbrev. (botany): Fuckel

Karl Wilhelm Gottlieb Leopold Fuckel (3 February 1821 – 8 May 1876) was a German botanist who worked largely on fungi.

He worked as an apothecary from 1836 to 1852, afterwards deriving income from a vineyard he owned in Oestrich im Rheingau.

The species epithet in the binomen Botryotinia fuckeliana, a plant pathogen and the causal agent of gray mold disease, was named by mycologist Heinrich Anton de Bary in honor of him. Fuckel was the taxonomic authority of the mycological genera Aleuria, Phyllachora (Nitschke ex Fuckel), Plectania and Sclerotinia.

== Works ==
- His exsiccata of Rhineland fungi, "Fungi rhenani exsiccati", contained a number of type specimens and taxonomic information on novelties of taxa that he proclaimed (Edit I Fascic. I-XXVII, 1863–75, edit. Fascic II. I-XXI, 1871–75).

He was also the author of:

- "Enumeratio Fungorum Nassoviae", Series I, (1860), an exsiccata-like series with Catalog of fungi from Nassau.
- "Symbolae mycologicae, Beiträge zur Kenntniss der Rheinischen Pilze", (1869–70); three supplements (1871, 1873 and 1875) - Contributions to the knowledge of Rhenish mushrooms.

Formerly in nations that did not speak English, the abbreviation Fuck. (with fullstop) was sometimes used.

== See also ==
- Category:Taxa named by Karl Wilhelm Gottlieb Leopold Fuckel
