= Pezizales =

- Clockwise from top left: Morchella esculenta (yellow morel); Sarcoscypha austriaca (scarlet elfcup); Chorioactis geaster (Texas star); Aleuria aurantia (orange peel fungus); Gyromitra esculenta (false morel); Peziza (cup fungi); Helvella vespertina (Western black elfin saddle); and Tuber aestivum (summer truffle)

Scientific classification
- Kingdom: Fungi
- Division: Ascomycota
- Class: Pezizomycetes
- Subclass: Pezizomycetidae
- Order: Pezizales; J.Schröt. (1897)

Families
- Ascobolaceae; Ascodesmidaceae; Caloscyphaceae; Carbomycetaceae; Chorioactidaceae; Discinaceae; Glaziellaceae; Helvellaceae; Karstenellaceae; Morchellaceae; Pezizaceae; Pyronemataceae; Rhizinaceae; Sarcoscyphaceae; Sarcosomataceae; Tuberaceae; Genera incertae sedis: Urceolaria

Order of fungi

The Pezizales are an order of the subphylum Pezizomycotina within the phylum Ascomycota. The order contains 16 families, 199 genera, and 1683 species. It contains a number of species of economic importance, such as morels, the black and white truffles, and the desert truffles. The Pezizales can be saprobic, mycorrhizal, or parasitic on plants. Species grow on soil, wood, leaves and dung. Soil-inhabiting species often fruit in habitats with a high pH and low content of organic matter, including disturbed ground. Most species occur in temperate regions or at high elevation. Several members of the Sarcoscyphaceae and Sarcosomataceae are common in tropical regions.

== Description ==
Members of this order are characterized by asci that typically open by rupturing to form a terminal or eccentric lid or operculum. The ascomata are apothecia or are closed structures of various forms derived from apothecia. Apothecia range in size from less than a millimeter to approximately 15 centimetres (6 inches), and may be stalked or sessile. The order includes epigeous, semihypogeous to hypogeous (truffles) taxa. The ascospores are single-celled, bipolar symmetrical, and usually bilaterally symmetrical, ranging from roughly spherical to ellipsoidal to occasionally fusoid. The ascospores of some species develop surface ornamentations such as warts, ridges, or spines. The tissues of the ascomata are fleshy and often fragile. Although the majority of species are known only in the teleomorphic state, the anamorphs of some species are known.

== Taxonomy ==
A phylogenetic analysis of molecular and morphological data suggests that there are three lineages within Pezizales. Lineage A includes Ascobolaceae and Pezizaceae. The former has no known hypogeous species. Lineage B includes the two epigeous families Rhizinaceae and Caloscyphaceae, as well as two sub-lineages with known hypogeous species, Morchellaceae–Discinaceae and Helvellaceae–Tuberaceae. Lineage C include Ascodesmidaceae, Sarcoscyphaceae, Sarcosomataceae with no known hypogeous species as well as Glaziellaceae and Pyronemataceae. It is unknown where Carbomycetaceae fits into this lineage.
