= Fred Jay Seaver =

American mycologist (1877–1970)

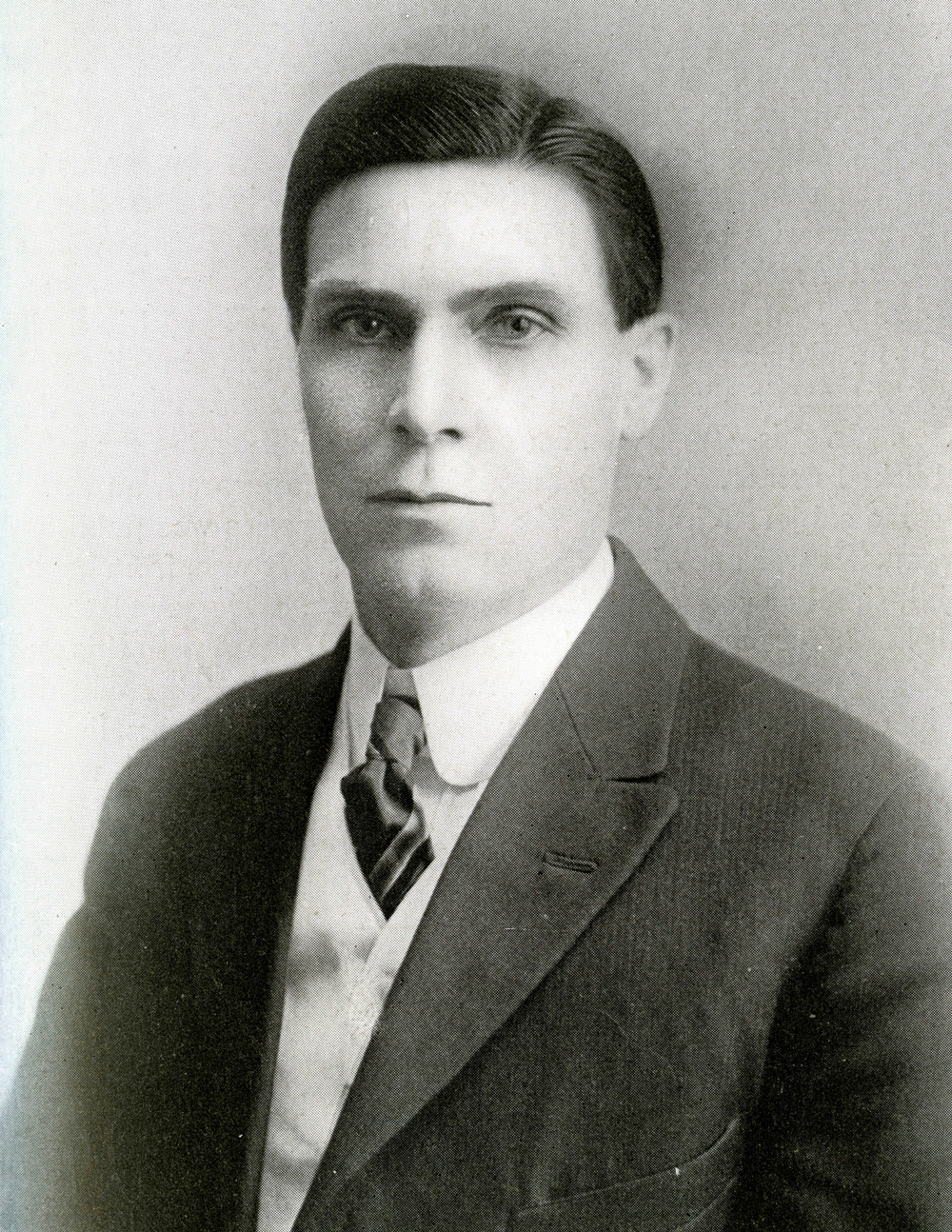
- Born: March 14, 1877; Webster County, Iowa
- Died: December 21, 1970 (aged 93); Winter Park, Florida
- Known for: Taxonomy and life histories of the Discomycetes
- Scientific career
- Fields: Mycology
- Author abbrev. (botany): Seaver

Fred Jay Seaver (14 March 1877 – 21 December 1970) was an American mycologist. He worked at the New York Botanical Garden for 40 years, initially as the Director of Laboratories (1908–1911), then as the Curator (1912–1943), and finally as Head Curator (1943–1948). Between 1907 and 1909 he issued two exsiccatae, North Dakota Fungi and Ascomycetes and lower fungi, the later with G. W. Wilson. He was also an editor of the journal Mycologia between 1909 and 1947. In 1928, Seaver published North American Cup-fungi (Operculates), which was expanded with a supplement in 1942 and a second volume in 1951, titled North American Cup-fungi (Inoperculates).

Botanist Herbert Hice Whetzel published Seaverinia in 1945, named after Seaver, which is a genus of fungi in the family Sclerotiniaceae.

== See also ==
- Category:Taxa named by Fred Jay Seaver
