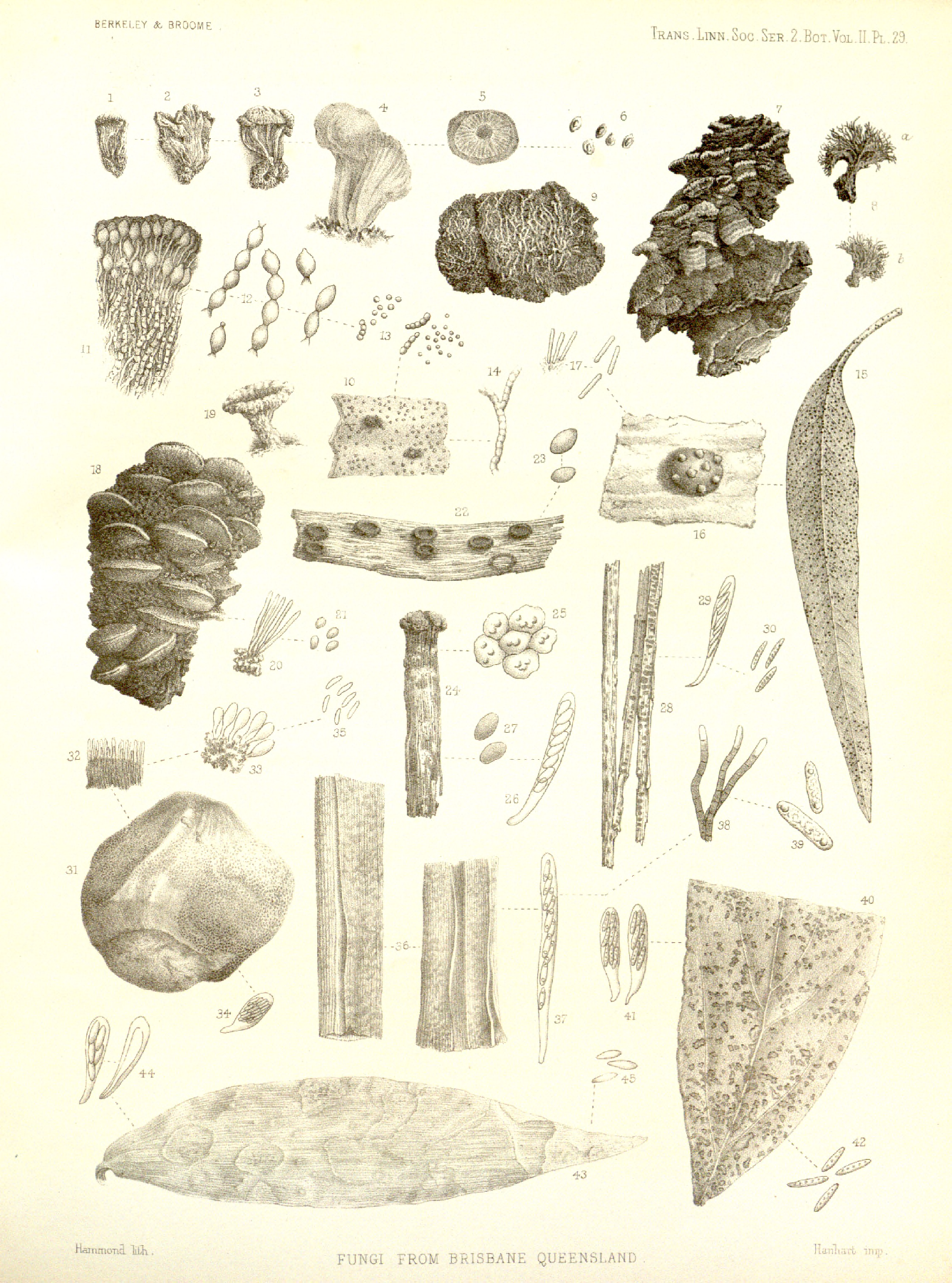
- Berkeley and Broome's 1887 drawings of various Australian fungi, including Tympanis toomansis (#s 18–22)

Scientific classification
- Kingdom: Fungi
- Division: Ascomycota
- Class: Leotiomycetes
- Order: Helotiales
- Family: Helotiaceae
- Genus: Banksiamyces; G.W. Beaton

Type species
- Banksiamyces macrocarpus G.W. Beaton

Species
- B. katerinae B. maccannii B. macrocarpus B. toomansis

= Banksiamyces =

Genus of fungi

Banksiamyces is a genus of fungi in the order Helotiales, with a tentative placement in the family Helotiaceae. The genus contains four species, which grow on the seed follicles of the dead infructescences or "cones" of various species of Banksia, a genus in the plant family Proteaceae endemic to Australia. Fruit bodies of the fungus appear as small (typically less than 10 mm diameter), shallow dark cups on the follicles of the Banksia fruit. The edges of dry fruit bodies fold inwards, appearing like narrow slits. The first specimens of Banksiamyces, known then as Tympanis toomansis, were described in 1887. Specimens continued to be collected occasionally for almost 100 years before becoming examined more critically in the early 1980s, leading to the creation of a new genus to contain what was determined to be three distinct species, B. katerinae, B. macrocarpus, and B. toomansis. A fourth species, B. maccannii, was added in 1984.

== Taxonomy ==
In 1887, English mycologists Miles Joseph Berkeley and Christopher Edmund Broome described a species of fungus they named Tympanis toomansis, collected from dead infructescences ("cones") of Banksia growing on the banks of the Tooma River in southern New South Wales, Australia. Its generic placement was a result of its resemblance to Tympanis, a genus in the family Helotiaceae of the Ascomycota.

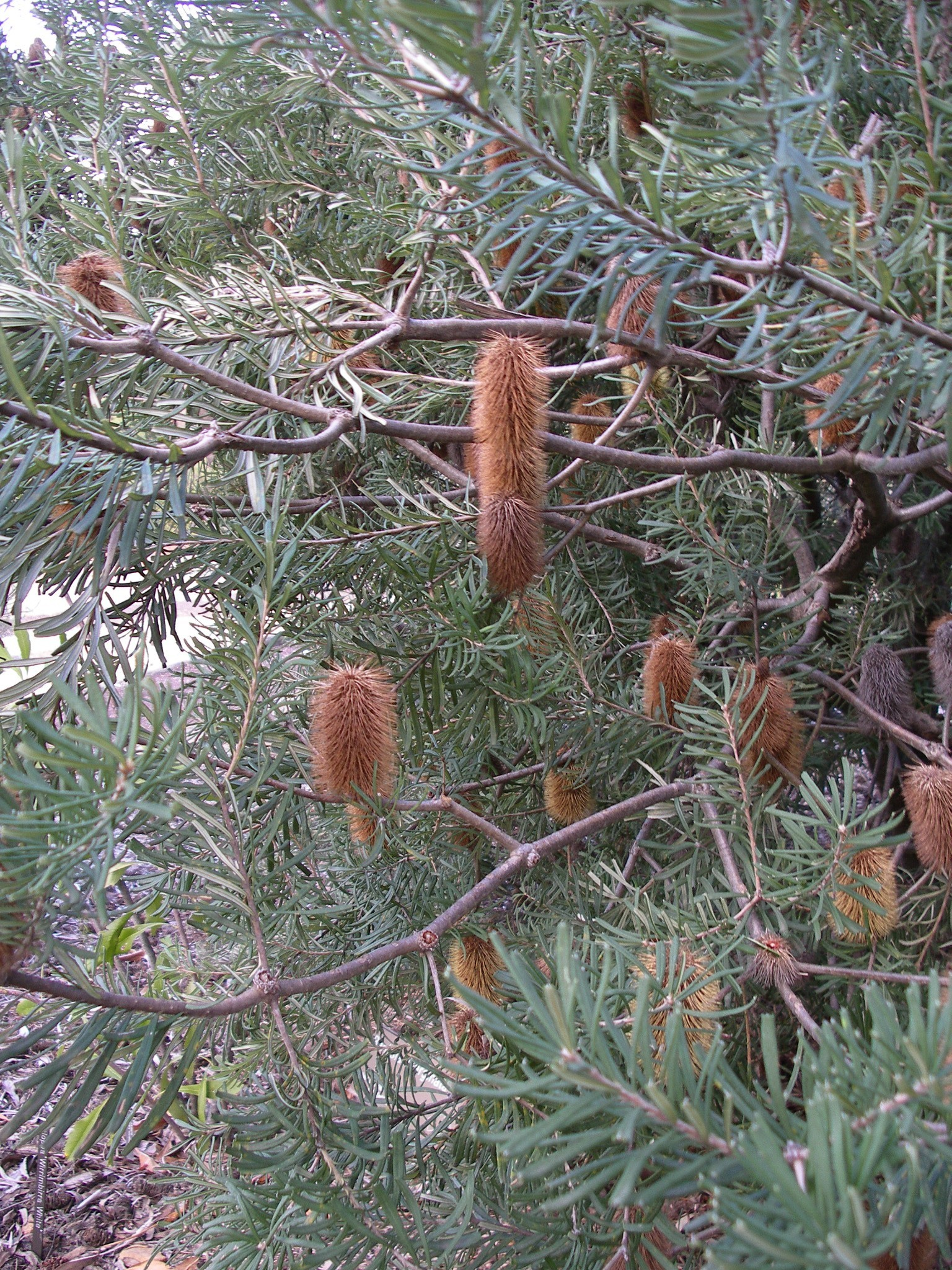
Banksia marginata, the shrub species from which the first Banksiamyces specimens were collected

Additional collections, then still believed to be T. toomansis, were made from South Australia in 1952, again on dead cones of unspecified Banksia, and also in 1956 on dead cones of Banksia marginata. In 1957 and 1958, R. W. G. Dennis redescribed the species, and after consultation with Canadian mycologist James Walton Groves, who had earlier completed a monograph on the genus Tympanis, transferred the taxon to the genus Encoelia (family Sclerotiniaceae). Encoelia species are small, tough, brownish discomycetes that typically grow in clusters on hardwood or woody substrates. Because the original collections were incomplete and certain microscopic features inadequately described, various collections made from Australia were presumed to be variations of the original 1887 collection.

In the 1980s, the availability of fresh specimens of the fungus—collected by Australian mycologist Bruce A. Fuhrer from the cones of Banksia spinulosa—prompted Gordon Beaton and Gretna Weste to reexamine the previous collections. Various apparent and microscopic differences were found which suggested that three distinct species were represented in the collections, and further, the species differed enough from other Encoelia species to warrant the creation of a new genus, which Beaton and Weste named Banksiamyces. The three Banksiamyces species they described in 1982 were the original B. toomansis (those initially named T. toomansis), as well as B. macrocarpus and B. katerinae. A fourth species, B. maccannii, was added to the genus by the same authors in 1984. A 2006 study identified two additional taxa that did not quite meet the description for previously published species; these have been called Banksiamyces aff. macrocarpus and Banksiamyces aff. toomansis. Some existing species were found on other banksia species, so evidence strengthened that the individual Banksiamyces fungi did not exclusively parasitize only one banksia species, a suggestion proposed by Beaton and Weste in 1982.

Banksiamyces is classified in the Helotiaceae, a widespread but poorly known family of fungi, many species of which are saprobic on herbaceous or woody tissues. The placement in the Helotiaceae is tentative, and no molecular analysis has yet been performed that might clarify the phylogenetic relationships of Banksiamyces to other taxa in the Helotiales order. Based on physical similarity, Wen-Ying Zhuang included Banksiamyces under Encoelia in his 1998 study of the Encoelioideae subfamily of the Helotiaceae. He conceded, however, that he had not examined any specimens.

== Description ==
The fruit bodies, or apothecia, of Banksiamyces species are cup-shaped receptacles borne on a stipe (stalk), colored dark brown to black with a dark grey center. When dry, the apothecia are covered with a whitish powder. The edges of the cup may be rolled inwards (especially when dry), or be twisted and somewhat flattened. Both the outermost tissue layer (the ectal excipulum) and the tissue of the stalk are made of fungal cells with brown pigments that can be variously thick- or thin-walled, covered with small particles (granules), and spherical to ellipsoid. The middle tissue layer (the medullary excipulum) of both the cup and the internal tissue layer (the medulla) of the stalk contain a layer of tissue made of hyphae similar to the ectal excipulum. A second layer of tissue is made of hyphae that are translucent and gelatinous; this layer may be present in either the medullary excipulum, the medulla, or both.

The asci are elongated reproductive structures that bear ascospores, in groups of eight. Banksiamyces species have asci that are cylindrical to club-shaped, and contain a plug at their extreme tips that will absorb color when stained with iodine. The ascospores may be arranged in one or two rows (uniseriate and biseriate, respectively), or rarely, irregular. The ascospores are ellipsoid, translucent, have a slight curve and may be tapered; most ascospores contain two oil drops. When in the ascus, the ascospores are covered with a translucent mucilage that is highly refractive to light. Paraphyses are filamentous hyphal cells present in the fertile spore-bearing tissue, distributed amongst the asci. The free ends of the paraphyses fork and branch, combining with the tips of the asci to form a translucent to brown pigmented layer of tissue.

== Species ==
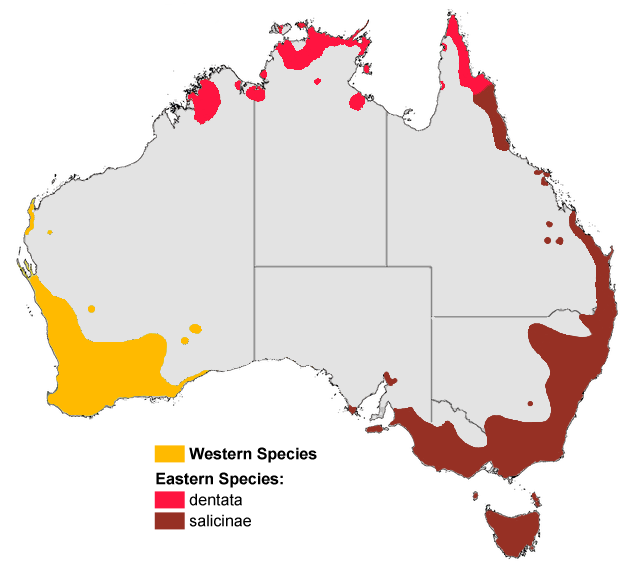
Distribution of Banksia species (the host of Banksiamyces), grouped into western species, Banksia dentata, and the series Salicinae

B. katerinae is named after G. Beaton's wife, the senior author of the 1982 protologue. It was first discovered in 1964, growing on the seed follicles of dead cones of Banksia ornata in the Mount Zero Area in the Grampians in northwestern Victoria.

B. maccannii, first described in 1984, was found on dead Banksia saxicola cones. The specific epithet was chosen to honor Ian McCann, for his "discovery of the type collection and ... his years of ecological, educational and conservation work in the Victorian Grampians." The fungus is distinguished from the other Banksiamyces species by its larger asci, larger spores, and tapering paraphyses tips. Further, the type collection was found fruiting in December and January, compared to winter and autumn for other Banksiamyces.

B. macrocarpus grows on the dead cones of Banksia spinulosa, and was first collected near Tonimbuk, Victoria in 1981. It is the type species of Banksiamyces.

B. toomansis is the species originally described and illustrated by Berkeley and Broome. The type collection was found on a cone of Banksia marginata on the banks of the Tooma River of New South Wales. It has also been recovered from a cone of Banksia sphaerocarpa from near Busselton in Western Australia, B. nutans, B. pulchella, B. speciosa, and B. occidentalis, all from Mount Merivale, 20 km (12 mi) east of Esperance, B. baxteri cultivated at Cranbourne Botanic Gardens, B. integrifolia from the Blue Mountains, and B. marginata from Kangaroo Island. Synonyms include Tympanis toomansis Berk. & Br., and Encoelia toomansis (Berk. & Br.). Its ascospores can range in shape from elliptical to cylindrical, and have dimensions of 6–10 by 2.5–3 μm.
