= Mary Elizabeth Elliott =

Canadian plant pathologist and mycologist

Mary Elizabeth Elliott (December 10, 1923 – September 10, 1976) was a Canadian plant pathologist and mycologist who spent 28 years with Agriculture and Agri-Food Canada. She was known for her work on the taxonomy and physiology of the Sclerotiniaceae; she was also knowledgeable in the identification of mushrooms, a service she offered regularly to the public, and served as president of the Canadian Botanical Association.

== Education ==
Elliott was born in Toronto, Ontario. Her family moved shortly after to Ottawa where she lived for the rest of her life. Elliott attended Ottawa schools before attending Queen's University, where she obtained her B.A. in biology in 1949.

== Career ==
In 1946, Elliott was assigned to work as a technician with J.W. Groves at the Central Experimental Farm in Ottawa. She worked in the division of Botany and Plant Pathology on the mycological side of their research on seed-borne diseases. This was major research during World War II as there was a shortage of quality seed. She took mycology and microbiology courses at Queen’s University during this time to support her work.

Her work with the Division of Botany and Plant Pathology lasted about 10 years before transferring to the Mycology unit. She expanded her studies to cereal diseases and started to gain expertise in the biology and taxonomy of Sclerotineaceae. Her studies on Sclerotiniaceae included her own taxonomic work in addition to physiological and developmental work started by Drayton and Groves. Along with Dr. J.W. Groves, she published a series of articles describing new species of Stromatinia, Streptotinia, and reported the sexual behaviour of other genera in the Sclerotiniaceae.

Elliott applied for a leave of absence to further her education and pursue graduate studies at this time but her request was rejected. She joined the Mycological Society of America in 1958 and was also a member of the Mycological Society of Japan and the Canadian Phytopathological Society.

Elliott was actively involved in community service where she would identify fungi for the public, provide toxicology information when there were poisonings related to fungi and identify the species that caused the poisoning. She worked to maintain an informed public by contributing to and editing (1970-71) "Greenhouse-Garden-Grass", an Institute publication for the layman.

In 1975, she became curator of the National Mycological Herbarium (DAOM). As curator, Mary worked to ensure that the storehouse of mycological information would aid staff mycologists and visiting scientists studying the taxonomy, morphology, life history, distribution, and range of hosts or substrates.

In 1972 Elliott accepted the position of secretary of the Canadian Botanical Association (CBA), she was successively nominated Vice-President in 1974, and President in 1975. She was just beginning her term as Past President at the time of her death.

== Death and legacy ==
Elliott died on September 10, 1976, in a homicide by an emotionally disturbed youth whom she had been helping.

The Mary Elliott Service Award is given to an individual for meritorious service to the CBA. It was first awarded in 1978 in memory of Elliott's contributions and untimely passing.
