= Sclerotinia bulborum =

Scientific classification
- Kingdom: Fungi
- Division: Ascomycota
- Class: Leotiomycetes
- Order: Helotiales
- Family: Sclerotiniaceae
- Genus: Sclerotinia
- Species: S. bulborum

Binomial name
- Sclerotinia bulborum (Wakker) Sacc.

Synonyms
- Peziza bulborum Wakker

Species of fungus

Sclerotinia bulborum is a plant pathogen infecting the bulbs of plants, causing black slime disease. It affects a number of ornamental bulbous plants including Iris, Hyacinth, Muscari and Narcissus.

== Bibliography ==
- Boerema, G. H.; Hamers, Maria E. C. (May 1989). "Check-list for scientific names of common parasitic fungi. Series 3b: Fungi on bulbs: Amaryllidaceae and Iridaceae". Netherlands Journal of Plant Pathology. 95 (S3): 1–29. doi:10.1007/BF01981520.
