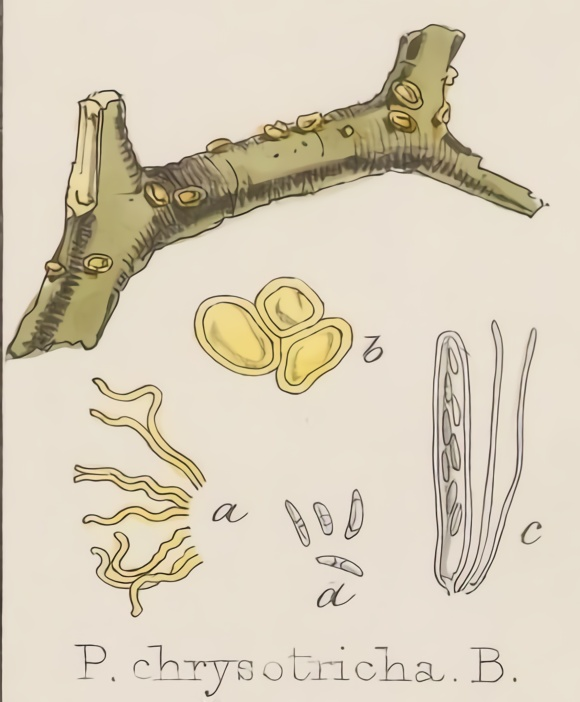
- Dicephalospora chrysotricha

Scientific classification
- Kingdom: Fungi
- Division: Ascomycota
- Class: Leotiomycetes
- Order: Helotiales
- Family: Sclerotiniaceae
- Genus: Dicephalospora; Spooner (1987)

Type species
- Dicephalospora calochroa (Syd.) Spooner (1987)

Species
- see text

= Dicephalospora =

Genus of fungi

Dicephalospora is a genus of fungi in the family Sclerotiniaceae. The genus was circumscribed by mycologist Brian Spooner in 1987. These ascomycete fungi occur on rotten wood, twigs and leaf stems.

== Species ==
- D. albolutea H.D. Zheng & W.Y. Zhuang (2019)
- D. calochroa (Syd.) Spooner (1987)
- D. chrysotricha (Berk.) Verkley (2004)
- D. damingshanica W.Y.Zhuang (1999)
- D. pinglongshanica W.Y.Zhuang (1999)
- D. shennongjiana H.D. Zheng & W.Y. Zhuang (2019)
- D. yunnanica H.D. Zheng & W.Y. Zhuang (2019)
