= Stromatinia cepivora =

Scientific classification
- Kingdom: Fungi
- Division: Ascomycota
- Class: Leotiomycetes
- Order: Helotiales
- Family: Sclerotiniaceae
- Genus: Stromatinia
- Species: S. cepivora

Binomial name
- Stromatinia cepivora (Berk.) Whetzel (1945)

Synonyms
- Sclerotium cepivorum Berk. 1841

Species of fungus

Stromatinia cepivora is a fungus in the division Ascomycota. It is the teleomorph of Sclerotium cepivorum, the cause of white rot in onions, garlic, and leeks. The infective sclerotia remain viable in the soil for many years and are stimulated to germinate by the presence of a susceptible crop.

== Pathogenesis ==
Sclerotium cepivorum is the asexual reproductive form of Stromatinia cepivora and is a plant pathogen, causing white rot in Allium species, particularly onions, leeks, and garlic. On a worldwide basis, white rot is probably the most serious threat to Allium crop production of any disease. This is a soil borne fungus and affects susceptible crops planted in infected soil containing sclerotia. The sclerotia that are developed in the life cycle can be spread to other fields by unsuccessful sanitation practices. The sclerotia can remain viable in the soil for years and germinate with a susceptible host to cause disease; therefore it is important to practice good sanitation efforts. Where the disease has occurred, recropping with further Allium species should be avoided for many years. The risk of infection can be reduced as far as possible in clean land by using disease-free planting material and avoiding contamination from infected fields. Making sure to clean machinery, boots and equipment will help to stop the spread of disease from an infected field. With infection occurring in cooler weather (50–70 °F (10–21 °C)), planting the crops at the right time is also important to not institute disease.

== Symptoms ==
The first symptoms noted with S. cepivora are the foliar symptoms. Plants are stunted in growth with yellow and wilting foliage. The leaves eventually die and fall off with the older leaves dying first and then the aerial leaves. Soil conditions and the environment are determinants for extent of damage to the plant. The pathogen grows in moist cold temperatures. So, in the right conditions, pathogenic activity increases as the root systems develop. The disease attacks at all stages of growth, which leaves the plant to turn yellow and wilt when fully developed because the roots are rotting. Mycelial growth is a sign that appears on the roots and spreads to the bulb causing it to rot. This mycelial growth can be seen at the base of the stem when foliage is yellowing and the foliar symptoms are first appearing. Black globular sclerotia, that resemble poppy seeds can also appear on the mycelium. These black sclerotia are about 0.5mm(1/32in) in diameter. These survival structures (sclerotia) can detach and persist for years in a dormant state, waiting for a susceptible host.

== Environment ==
The White Rot pathogen is dependent upon temperature. Environmental conditions influence the germination with it favoring cooler weather (50-70 F). If there is high soil moisture present, germination and infection will be favored. However, the sclerotia and fungal growth are inhibited above 70 F. With the pathogen favoring cool wet summers, irrigation can also be a problem in spreading the disease from an infected field to a clean field. Therefore, this pathogen is of great concern to growers experiencing cool wet summers.

== Disease cycle ==
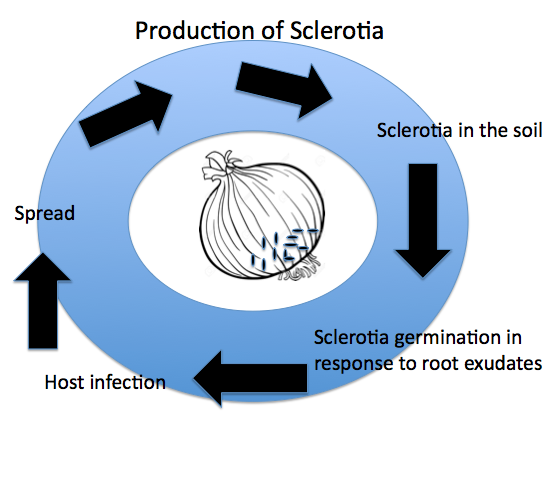
Sclerotia production in S. Cepivora

Stromatinia cepivora is a soil borne fungus. This is a monocyclic disease meaning it only has one reproductive cycle a season. This is a unique fungus as it does not produce any spores of importance to a normal life cycle. It exists and overwinters as sclerotia (the survival stage). These small black globular structures are resistant to adverse temperatures and can remain dormant in the soil for years even without a host. Sclerotia germinate in response to root exudates. Weather is also a factor of germination and hyphae growth. Mycelium grow through the soil and form an appresoria once a host root is available. Appresoria are able to attach and penetrate the host. Mycelium grow out from the roots and can spread to a neighboring plant which creates the row of disease. Even small amounts of sclerotia can cause disease and be difficult to control. Sclerotia infect the host and spread. They are formed on the decaying host tissue and then are left free in the soil. To control the disease there needs to be a reduction in the number of sclerotia in the soil so fungus growth can be halted and unable to grow. Overall, multiple controls are necessary to produce an adequate yield in infected fields.

Anything that moves the infested soil, such as wind, water, equipment, boots, etc., will move sclerotia and cause the disease to spread.

== Importance ==
This is serious disease for plants of the Allium genus. The soil borne fungus can persist in the soil for many years. This disease is present in all Allium-producing regions making it a threat in the Allium production industry and a worldwide disease. It has been found in the United States 10 times with the first in 1918 in Oregon and the latest in 2014 in an onion field. Onions and garlic are economically important vegetables in the world. S. cepivora is one of the most destructive diseases carrying high loss in onion and garlic. Once land has been infested, it is considered not suitable for garlic or onion production for up to 40 or more years. Furthermore, an extremely small infection can be devastating. If just one sclerotium is in 20 pounds of soil, it will cause disease and significant crop loss.

“One sclerotium per 20 pounds of soil will cause disease and results in measurable crop loss.”

White rot in the United States

- 1918: First found in La Grande, Oregon
- 1930s: San Francisco area
- 1940s: Gilroy and Tulelake, California; Klamath Falls, Oregon; Walla Walla, Washington
- 1950s: Salinas, Nevada; Willamette Valley, Oregon
- 1970s: Central Oregon, San Joaquin Valley
- 1989: Treasure Valley
- 2004: Marion County, Oregon
- 2008: Crook County, Oregon
- 2010: Home-grown garlic in the Palouse Falls region

== Management ==
=== Cultural controls ===
Knowing when to plant and harvest the crops is important to avoid the pathogen. Referring to the environmental section, this pathogen thrives under cool temps and moisture in the soil. Irrigation can cause disease, therefore if disease is present, looking at problems with moisture and reducing problems with irrigation can help to combat the pathogen and keep the disease in infected fields from spreading. Also planting in the spring and harvesting in the fall can help to reduce the disease.

=== Sanitation ===
One way to control this pathogen is planting clean seed. By planting clean seed and not infected seed, you are stopping the spread of disease. It is transported and spread in contaminated soil, for example on tools or equipment. If the infected soil is moved, the sclerotia will be dispersed as well. This is a survival structure in the life cycle of the pathogen that can stay active in the soil up to 30 years without a suitable host. By having sanitation practices in place the pathogen will not be spread. An example of a sanitation practice is washing the equipment with water and making sure all remnants of soil are gone so it cannot spread to a different allotment. Lastly, making sure that soil is not spread by tools or boots by washing them as well.

=== Chemical controls ===
As sclerotia are a survival structure in the life cycle for the pathogen, it is important to reduce and eliminate sclerotia in the soil. One effective way to reduce sclerotia is sclerotia germination stimulants. These germination stimulants can reduce sclerotia by 90%. One way to do this is using diallyl disulfide (DADS). This chemical is what triggers sclerotia to germinate. Upon using DADS in the soil, no Allium crops can be grown in that soil for a year to keep the treatment effective. If there are Allium crops growing they will be able to complete their lifecycle and keep sclerotia in the soil. Therefore, DADS is applied artificially in the field with no Allium species, which in turn has sclerotia germinate and unable to find a host and die rather than lay dormant in the soil. This can also be done by applying a garlic extract or the use of certain petroleum-based products. Dipping seed garlic in water at 115 °F (46 °C) is effective, but higher temperatures may kill the cloves. It is also important to use fungicides with the chemical DADS. There are three fungicides that are registered for white rot. They are: tebuconazole, fludioxonil and boscalid with tebuconazole being the most effective. All of these fungicides need to be applied right at planting, as later fungicide applications are not effective to control disease. It is also important to note that once an infection is found there are no chemical controls to stop or reduce disease during that season.

== Use in biocontrol ==
The three-cornered leek (Allium triquetrum) has been introduced into Australia where it has spread and become established in nutrient-deficient, damp habitats. The plant is now considered to be a noxious invasive species, as it is difficult to control or eradicate. S. cepivora is being investigated as a possible biological control agent for the plant. No naturally occurring members of the genus Allium occur in Australia, and in a trial, the fungus was found to be effective at killing all but one of the target samples on which it was tested. However, the researchers involved in the study acknowledged, "Releasing a virulent pathogen for cultivated Allium species into bushland or pasture is controversial and any field release would require safeguards against spread to areas suitable for the production of cultivated Allium species, such as onions, leeks and garlic, before S. cepivora could be introduced as a potential biological control agent.
