= Jack o' lantern mushroom =

Jack o' lantern mushroom is a common name for several fungus species in the genus Omphalotus:

- Omphalotus illudens of eastern North America
- Omphalotus olearius occurs in Europe and South Africa
- Omphalotus olivascens of California and Mexico

== See also ==
- Swamp beacon
- Swamp candle (disambiguation)
- Swamp lantern
