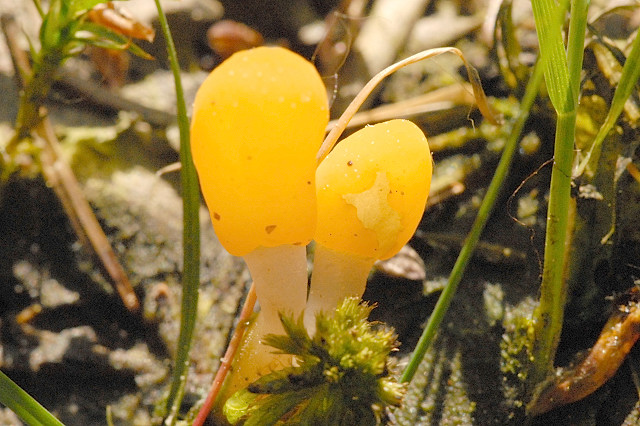
- Mitrula paludosa

Scientific classification
- Kingdom: Fungi
- Division: Ascomycota
- Class: Leotiomycetes
- Order: Helotiales
- Family: Sclerotiniaceae
- Genus: Mitrula; Fr.

Type species
- Mitrula paludosa Fr.

Species
- M. alba M. elegans M. lunulatospora M. microspora M. paludosa M. serpentina

= Mitrula =

Genus of fungi

Mitrula is a genus of fungi in the family Sclerotiniaceae first described by Elias Magnus Fries, in his Systema Mycologicum (1821).

The common name for the matchstick-like fungus is either swamp beacon (US) or bog beacon (GB) refers to the white stipe with yellow fruiting cap. The genus is notable for growing on decaying vegetation in shallow water.

The saprobiontic fungi depend on wet or boggy habitats, with plenty of rotting vegetation. They live and feed on rotting leaves and stems, breaking them down into smaller compounds on which various plants and animals feed.

The aquatic discomycete Mitrula can be found in Europe, Asia, and North America. They still hold an uncertain position within the Helotiales.

The species include Mitrula alba, Mitrula elegans, Mitrula lunulatospora, Mitrula microspora, Mitrula paludosa and Mitrula serpentina. Some of them are difficult to distinguish, for instance the match-stick fungus Mitrula elegans is often mistaken as Mitrula paludosa.

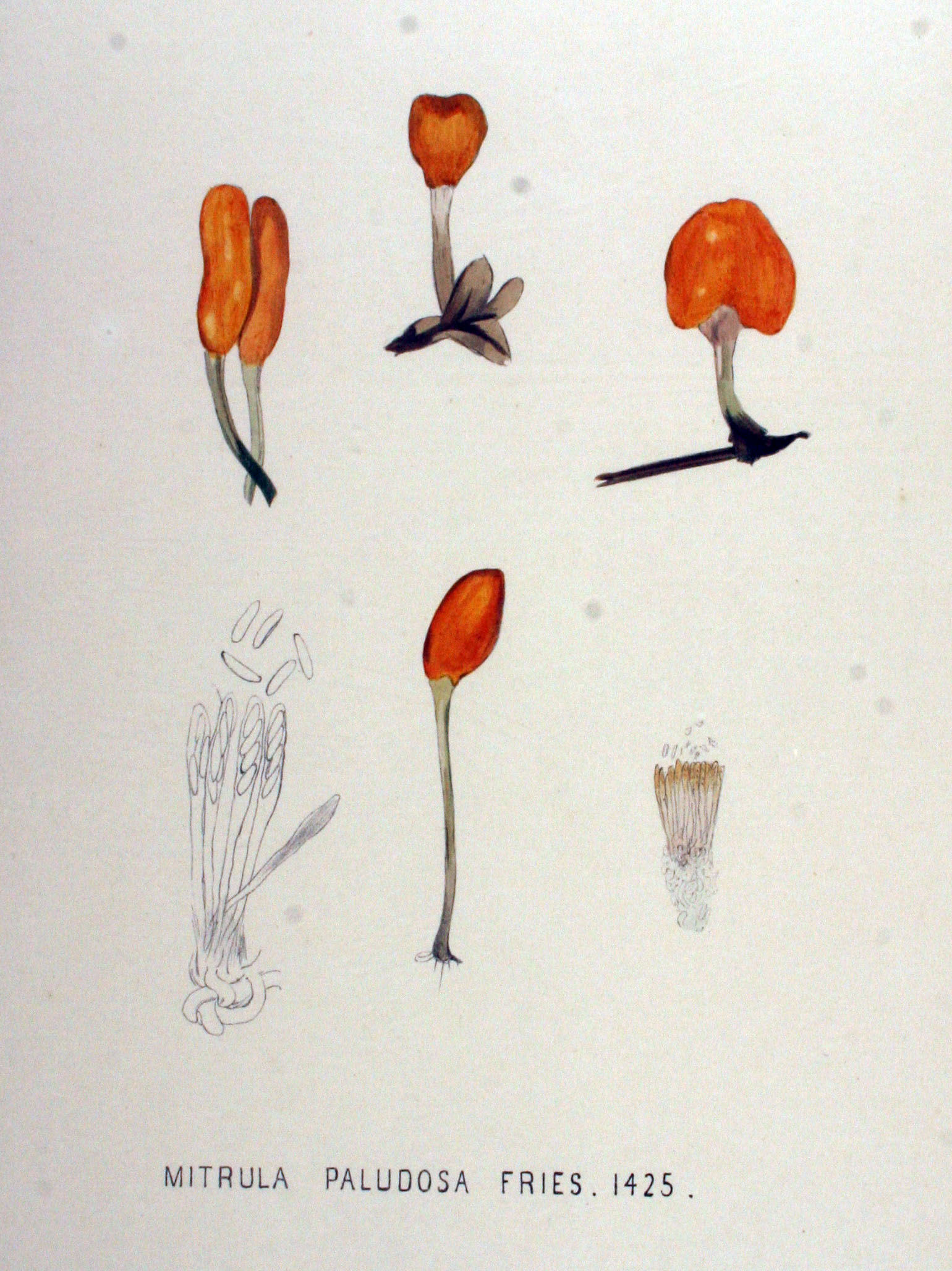
Mitrula paludosa, illustration by Jan Kops, Flora Batava, 1816)

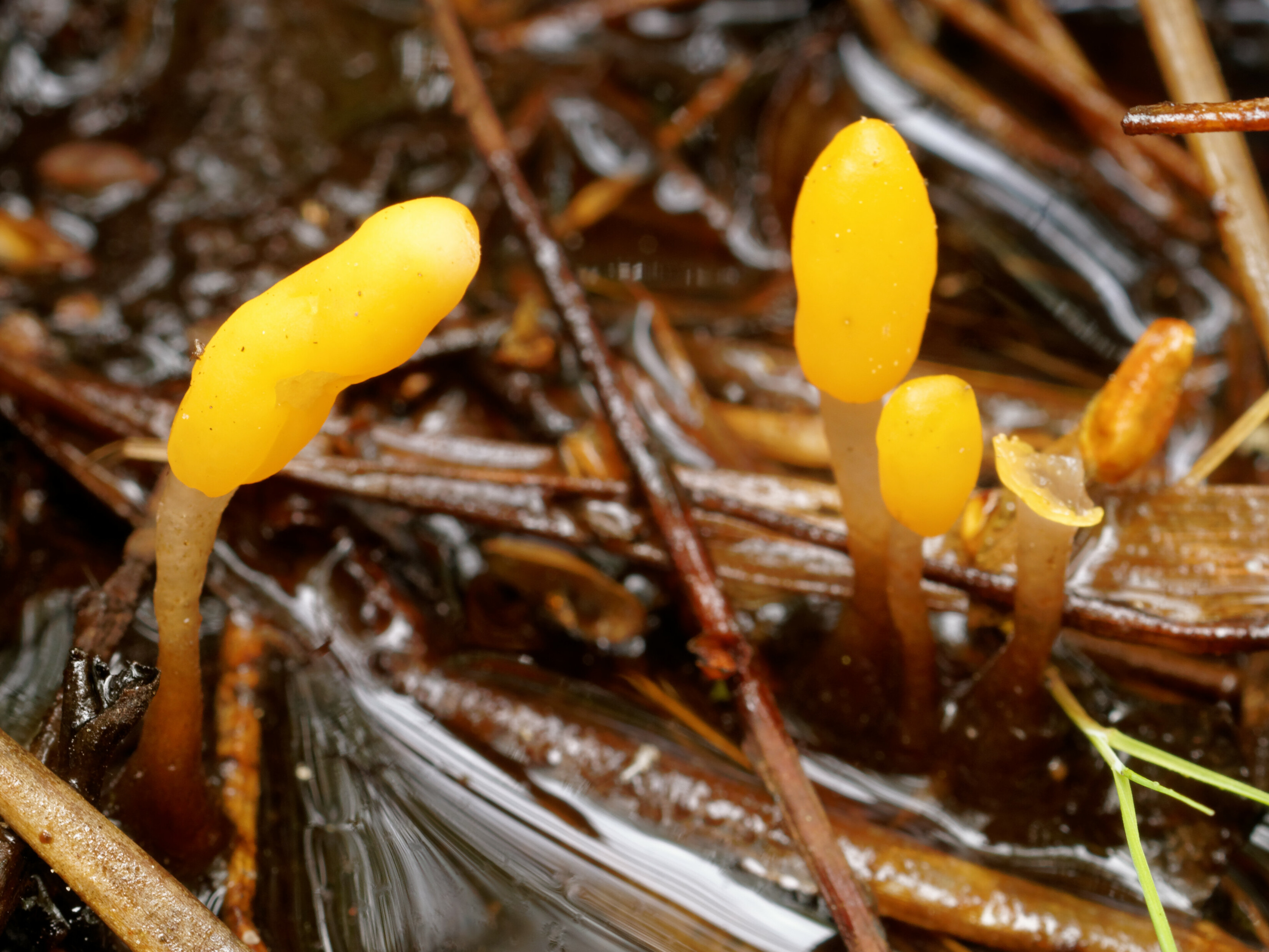
Mitrula paludosa

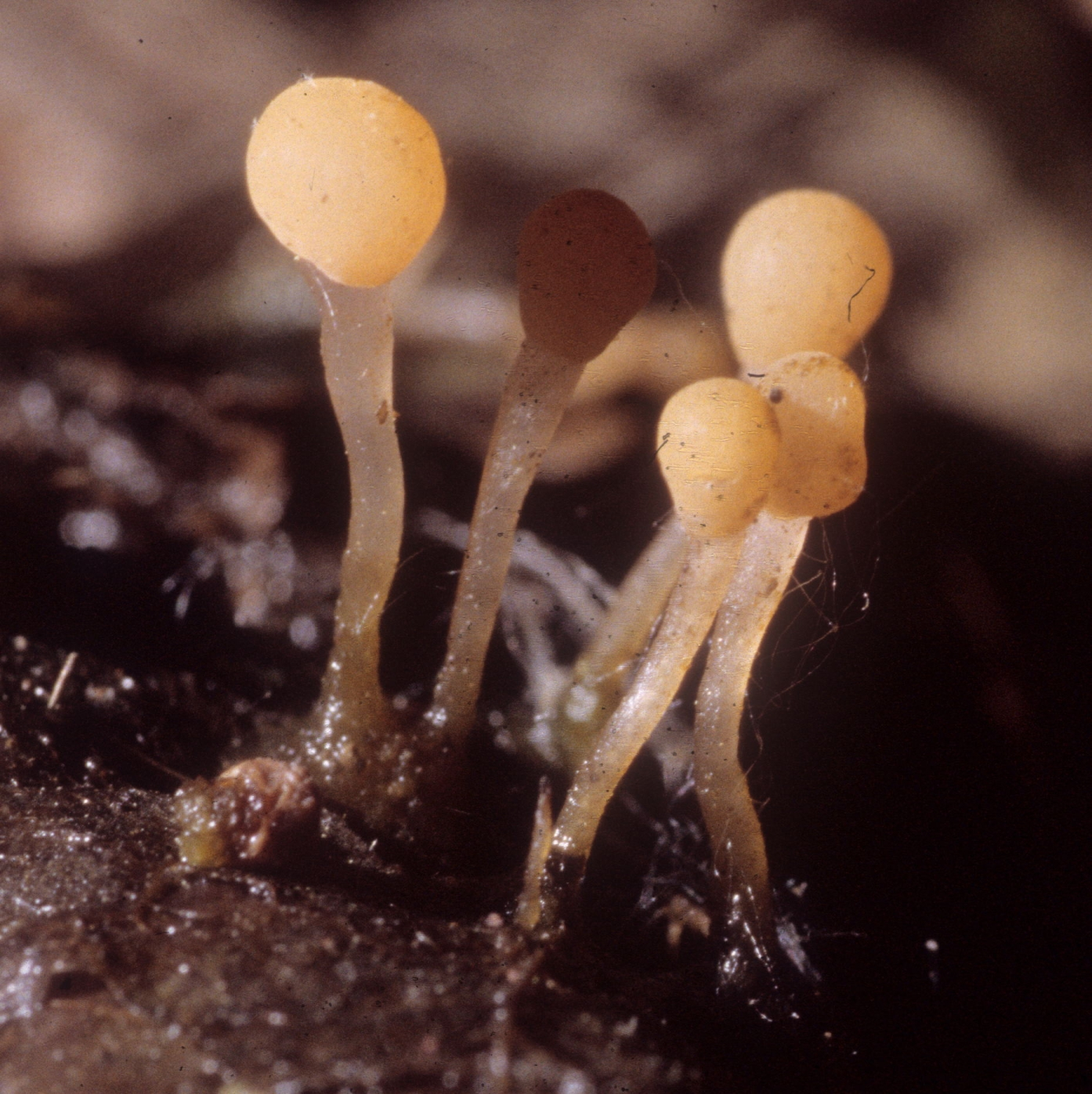
Redhead; Mitrula lunulatospora

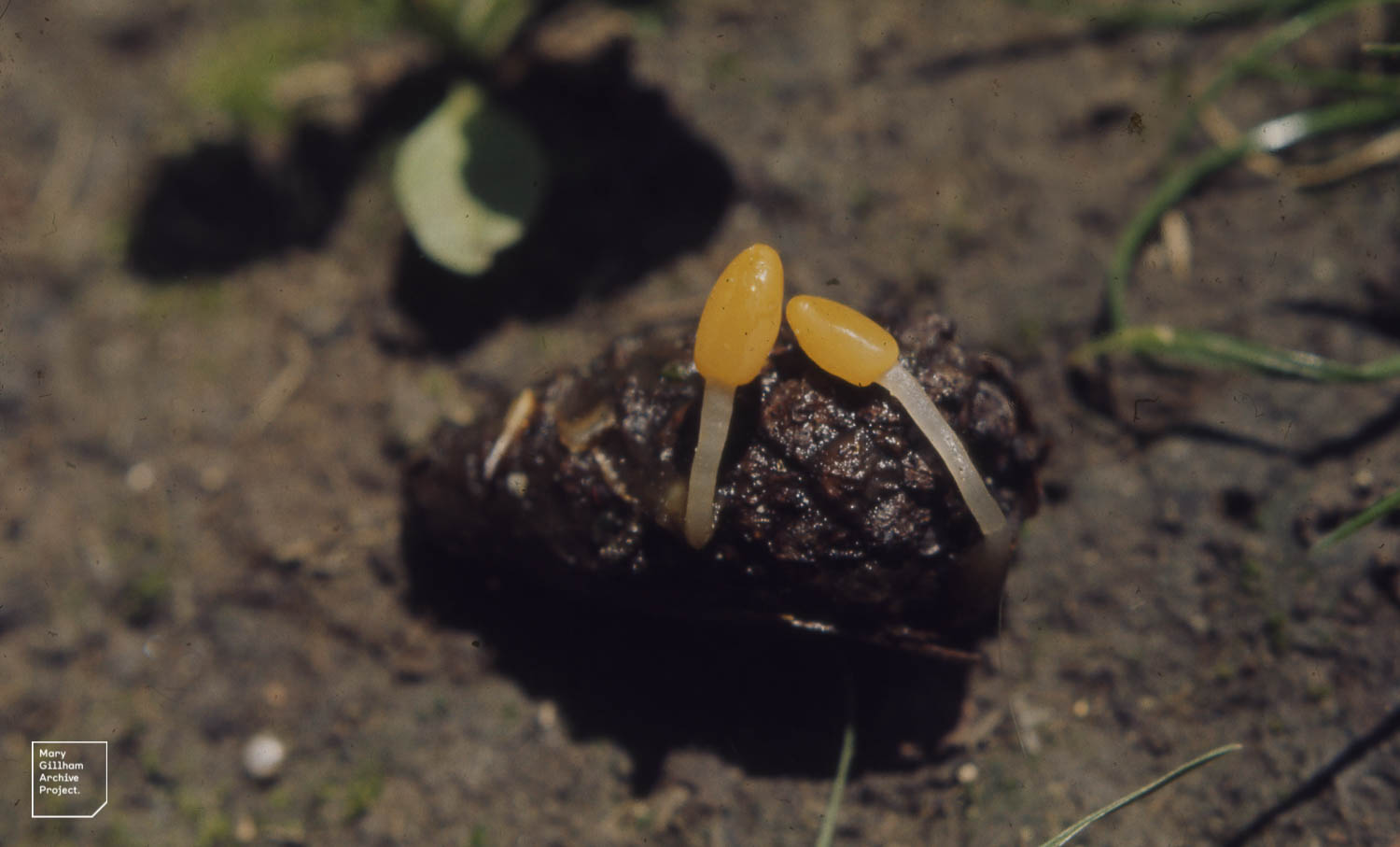
Mitrula paludosa on pine cone, River Taff, Wales

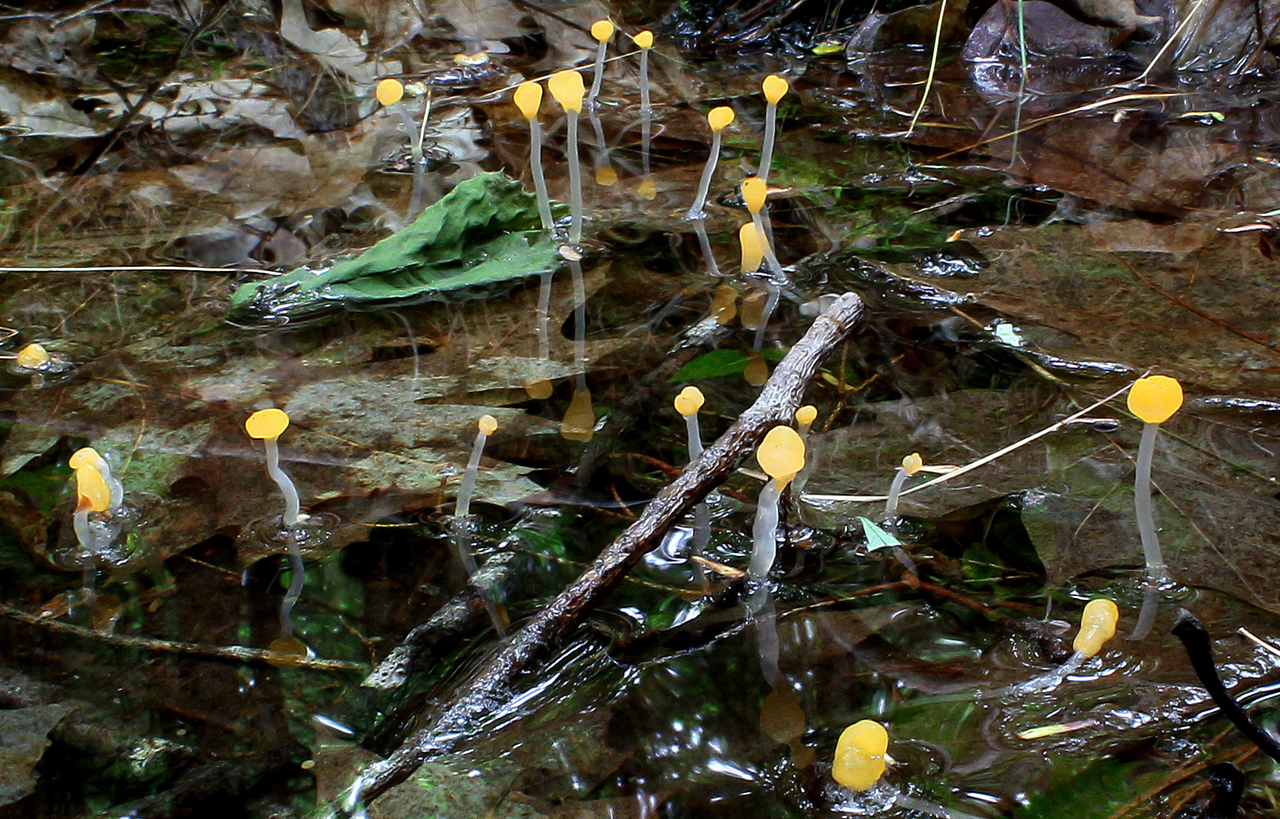
Mitrula elegans
