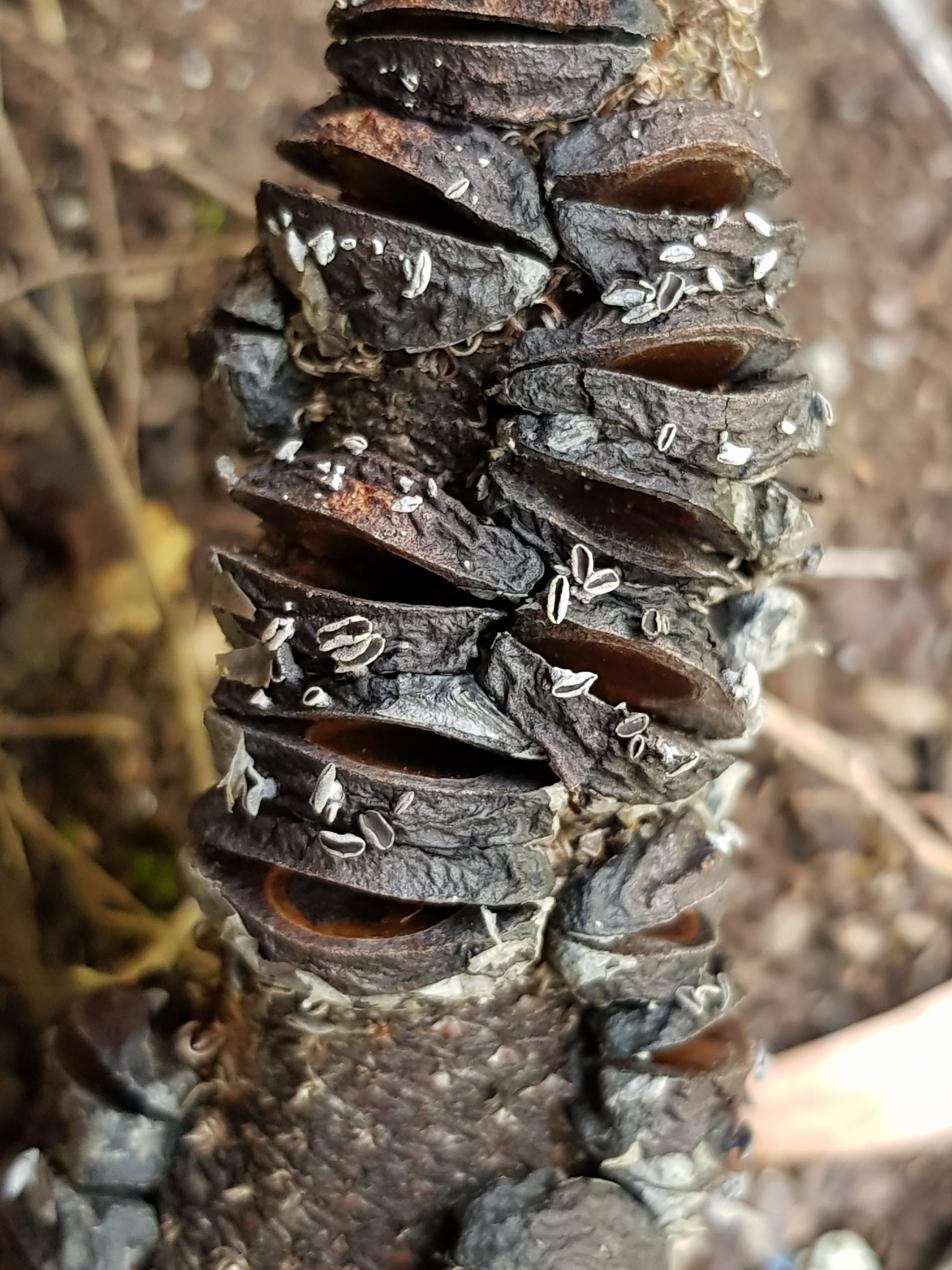

Scientific classification
- Domain: Eukaryota
- Kingdom: Fungi
- Division: Ascomycota
- Class: Leotiomycetes
- Order: Helotiales
- Family: Helotiaceae
- Genus: Banksiamyces
- Species: B. toomansis

Binomial name
- Banksiamyces toomansis (Berk. & Broome) G.W.Beaton (1982)

Synonyms
- Tympanis toomansis Berk. & Broome (1886); Encoelia toomansis (Berk. & Broome) Dennis (1958)

= Banksiamyces toomansis =

Species of fungus

Banksiamyces toomansis is a species of fungus in the family Helotiaceae. It was first described as Tympanis toomansis by Miles Joseph Berkeley and Christopher Edmund Broome in 1886, and transferred to the genus Encoelia in 1957 by R.W.G. Dennis. Gordon William Beaton transferred it to Banksiamyces in 1982.

The fungus grows on dead Banksia cones, and has a distribution limited to Australia. The disc-shaped fruitbodies of the fungus have dimensions of about 2–5 millimetres (0.08–0.20 in), and are light grey to dark charcoal grey. They are attached to the cones by stalks up to 5 mm (0.2 in) long. Its ascospores can range in shape from elliptical to cylindrical, and have dimensions of 6–10 by 2.5–3 μm.

The type collection of B. toomansis was found on a cone of Banksia marginata on the banks of the Tooma River of New South Wales. Unlike some other Banksiamyces species that are restricted to a single host, B. toomansis has a wider host range. It has been recovered from a cone of Banksia sphaerocarpa from near Busselton in Western Australia, B. nutans, B. pulchella, B. speciosa, and B. occidentalis, all from Mount Merivale, 20 km (12 mi) east of Esperance, B. baxteri cultivated at Cranbourne Botanic Gardens, B. integrifolia from the Blue Mountains, and B. marginata from Kangaroo Island. Synonyms include Tympanis toomansis Berk. & Br., and Encoelia toomansis (Berk. & Br.).
