= Swamp candle =

Swamp candle is the common name for two different plant species:

- Lysimachia terrestris, in the family Primulaceae
- Schoenolirion croceum, in the family Asparagaceae

== See also ==
- Jack o' lantern mushroom
- Swamp beacon
- Swamp lantern
