= Sclerotinia spermophila =

Scientific classification
- Kingdom: Fungi
- Division: Ascomycota
- Class: Leotiomycetes
- Order: Helotiales
- Family: Sclerotiniaceae
- Genus: Sclerotinia
- Species: S. spermophila

Binomial name
- Sclerotinia spermophila Noble, (1948)

Species of fungus

Sclerotinia spermophila is a plant pathogen, infecting red clover, but can also be considered an animal pathogen.
