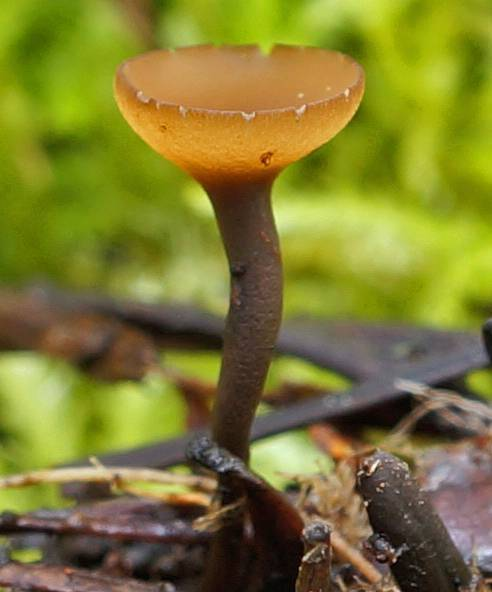

Scientific classification
- Domain: Eukaryota
- Kingdom: Fungi
- Division: Ascomycota
- Class: Leotiomycetes
- Order: Helotiales
- Family: Sclerotiniaceae
- Genus: Ciboria
- Species: C. rufofusca

Binomial name
- Ciboria rufofusca (O.Weberb.) Sacc. (1889)

Synonyms
- Peziza rufofusca O.Weberb. (1873)

= Ciboria rufofusca =

Species of fungus

Ciboria rufofusca is a species of ascomycete fungus in the family Sclerotiniaceae. It was first described as a member of Peziza in 1873 and later transferred to the genus Ciboria in 1889. The fungus produces distinctive cup-shaped fruiting bodies that are brown to maroon on the inside, supported by dark brown to blackish stalks, and typically measure up to 15 mm in diameter. It grows exclusively on fallen cone scales of conifers, primarily silver fir (Abies alba) and occasionally other fir species, spruces, and Douglas fir. Though considered rare throughout most of Western Europe except in mountainous regions where silver fir is abundant, C. rufofusca can also be found in the Pacific Northwest region of North America.

== Description ==
Ciboria rufofusca is an ascomycete fungus that forms distinctive cup-shaped fruiting bodies (apothecia). The apothecia are cupuliform (cup-shaped) and vesicular (blister-like) when young, reaching up to 15 mm in diameter. These fruiting structures are supported on a dark brown to blackish stipe that attaches directly to the substrate—typically scales from conifer cones. The stipe is generally short but can reach up to 10 mm in length when growing from buried cone scales.

The margin (edge) of the cup is initially entire (smooth), but later becomes incised, gradually spreading to form an undulating and lobed-incurved shape as the fungus matures. The hymenium (spore-bearing surface) on the inner surface of the cup is smooth and uniformly brown to maroon in colour. The outer surface (excipulum) is paler than the hymenium and has a furfuraceous (scurfy or bran-like) texture.

Microscopically, the spores are oval, smooth, hyaline (transparent), and measure 5.0–7.3 × 3.0–3.5 micrometres (μm). They typically contain one or two small oil droplets (guttules) at each end. The asci (spore-containing cells) are cylindrical, measure 75–110 × 5.5–6.0 μm, and each contains eight spores arranged in a single row (uniseriate). The ascus apex shows a weak but distinct bluing reaction when stained with iodine. The paraphyses (sterile filaments between asci) are non-septate (without cross-walls), slender, and barely swollen at their tips, measuring 70–75 μm in length. The excipulum (outer tissue layer) terminates in distinctive pear-shaped (piriform) cells.

== Habitat and distribution ==
Ciboria rufofusca grows exclusively on fallen cone scales of conifers, primarily Abies alba (silver fir). The fungus has also been documented on cone scales of other Abies species, various Picea (spruce) species, and occasionally on Pseudotsuga menziesii (Douglas fir). In the Pacific Northwest region of North America, it grows on fallen fir cones.

This species is considered rare throughout most of Western Europe, except in mountainous regions. It is relatively frequent in the Jura Mountains and the Vosges Mountains where silver fir is abundant. According to distribution maps, the species has been documented in the Eifel region of Germany and in Luxembourg's Little Switzerland region. In Belgium, the species is extremely rare. The habitat preference for Abies alba (which is not native to Belgium but only planted as an ornamental tree in parks and gardens) limits its distribution. Prior to Mertens' 2008 discovery in Walloon Brabant, only one other potential collection had been reported in Belgium, from Huizingen on Douglas fir cone scales in May 2001, though this specimen was not preserved. The species has also been collected just 12 km from the Belgian border in the French Ardennes. The fruiting bodies typically appear in early spring (March to May) on humid soil where cone scales have fallen.
