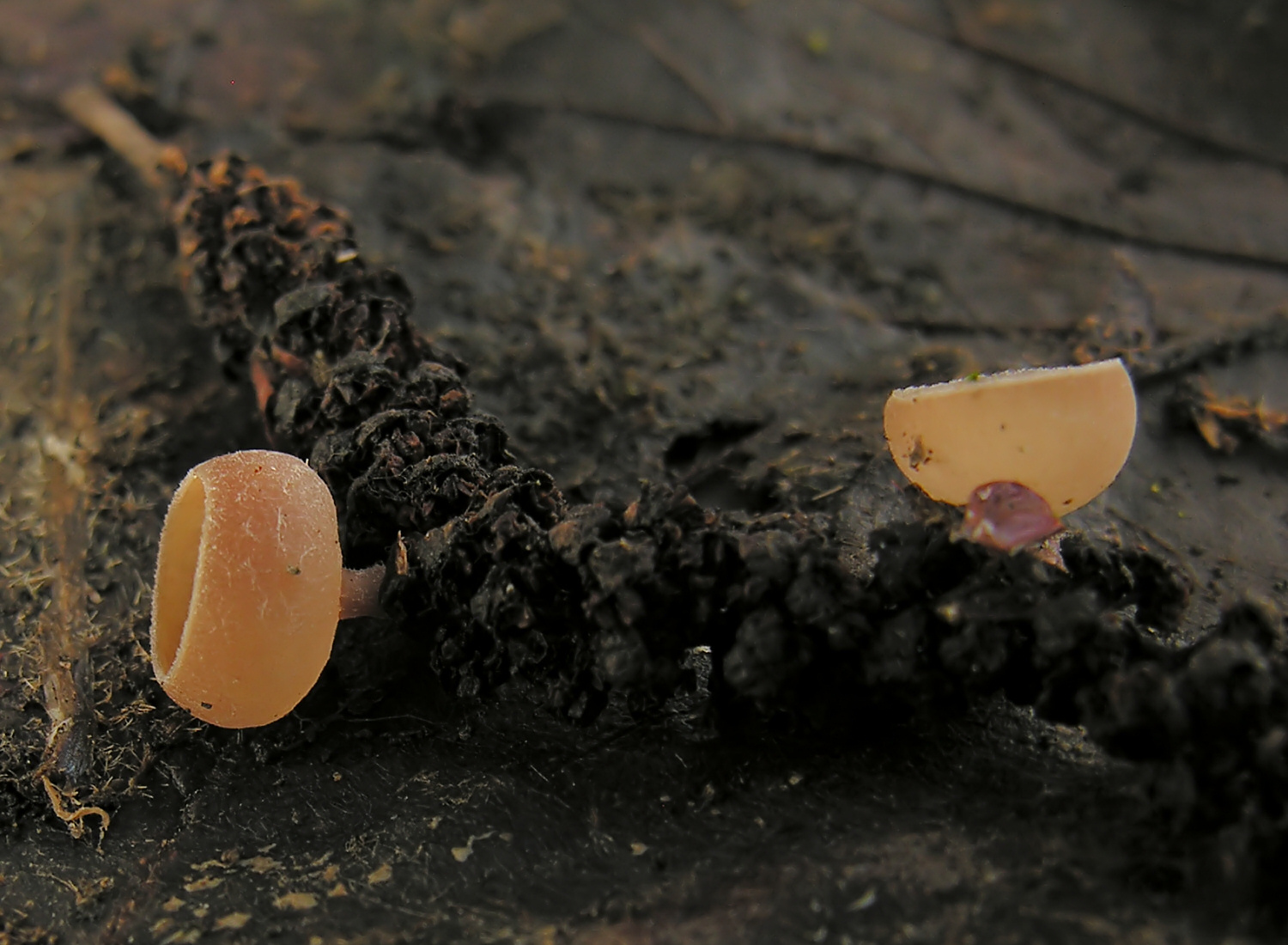

Scientific classification
- Kingdom: Fungi
- Division: Ascomycota
- Class: Leotiomycetes
- Order: Helotiales
- Family: Sclerotiniaceae
- Genus: Ciboria
- Species: C. amentacea

Binomial name
- Ciboria amentacea (Balb.) Fuckel (1870)

Synonyms
- Peziza amentacea Balb. (1804); Rutstroemia amentacea (Balb.) P.Karst. (1871); Hymenoscyphus amentaceus (Balb.) W.Phillips (1887)

= Ciboria amentacea =

Species of fungus

Ciboria amentacea, commonly known as the catkin cup, is a species of ascomycete fungus in the family Sclerotiniaceae. It was first described by Giovanni Battista Balbis in 1804 as Peziza amentacea. Karl Wilhelm Gottlieb Leopold Fuckel transferred it to Ciboria in 1870.

The cap is up to 1.2 centimetres (1/2 in) across. The species is widespread in Europe and North America, where it grows on catkins of willow and alder.
