= Sclerotinia ricini =

Scientific classification
- Kingdom: Fungi
- Division: Ascomycota
- Class: Leotiomycetes
- Order: Helotiales
- Family: Sclerotiniaceae
- Genus: Sclerotinia
- Species: S. ricini

Binomial name
- Sclerotinia ricini G.H.Godfrey, (1919)

Synonyms
- Botryotinia ricini (G.H. Godfrey) Whetzel, (1945)

Species of fungus

Sclerotinia ricini is a plant pathogen infecting poinsettias.
