= Seaverinia =

Scientific classification
- Kingdom: Fungi
- Division: Ascomycota
- Class: Leotiomycetes
- Order: Helotiales
- Family: Sclerotiniaceae
- Genus: Seaverinia; Whetzel

Type species
- Seaverinia geranii (Seaver & W.T. Horne) Whetzel

Synonyms
- Sclerotinia geranii Seaver & W.T. Horne, Mem. Torrey bot. Club 17: 205 (1918)

Genus of fungi

Seaverinia is a genus of fungi in the family Sclerotiniaceae. This is a monotypic genus, containing the single species Seaverinia geranii.

The genus was circumscribed by Herbert Hice Whetzel in Mycologia vol.37 (6) on page 703 in 1945.

The genus name of Seaverinia is in honour of Fred Jay Seaver (1877–1970), who was an American mycologist.
