= Spooneromyces =

Scientific classification
- Kingdom: Fungi
- Division: Ascomycota
- Class: Pezizomycetes
- Order: Pezizales
- Family: Pyronemataceae
- Genus: Spooneromyces; T.Schumach. & J.Moravec (1989)

Type species
- Spooneromyces laeticolor (P.Karst.) T.Schumach. & J.Moravec (1989)

Genus of fungi

Spooneromyces is a genus of fungi in the family Pyronemataceae named for mycologist Brian Spooner.

== Species ==
- Spooneromyces daliensis
- Spooneromyces helveticus
- Spooneromyces laeticolor
- Spooneromyces microsporus
