= Elliottinia =

Scientific classification
- Kingdom: Fungi
- Division: Ascomycota
- Class: Leotiomycetes
- Order: Helotiales
- Family: Sclerotiniaceae
- Genus: Elliottinia; L.M. Kohn

Type species
- Elliottinia kerneri L.M. Kohn

Genus of fungi

Elliottinia is a genus of fungi in the family Sclerotiniaceae. This is a monotypic genus, containing the single species Elliottinia kerneri.
