= Phaeosclerotinia =

Scientific classification
- Kingdom: Fungi
- Division: Ascomycota
- Class: Leotiomycetes
- Order: Helotiales
- Family: Sclerotiniaceae
- Genus: Phaeosclerotinia; Hori

Type species
- Phaeosclerotinia nipponica Hori

Genus of fungi

Phaeosclerotinia is a genus of fungi in the family Sclerotiniaceae.
