= Martininia =

Scientific classification
- Kingdom: Fungi
- Division: Ascomycota
- Class: Leotiomycetes
- Order: Helotiales
- Family: Sclerotiniaceae
- Genus: Martininia; Dumont & Korf

Type species
- Martininia panamaensis (Whetzel) Dumont & Korf

Synonyms
- Martinia Whetzel, 1942

Genus of fungi

Martininia is a genus of fungi in the family Sclerotiniaceae.

The genus name of Martininia is in honour of George Willard Martin (1886–1971), who was an American mycologist.

The genus was circumscribed by Kent Parsons Dumont and Richard Paul Korf in Mycologia vol.62 (Issue 3) on page 608 in 1970.
