= Amerosporium =

Scientific classification
- Kingdom: Fungi
- Division: Ascomycota
- Class: Leotiomycetes
- Order: Helotiales
- Family: Sclerotiniaceae
- Genus: Amerosporium; Speg.

Extant species
- See text

Genus of fungi

Amerosporium is a genus of fungi belonging to the family Sclerotiniaceae. It was described in 1882 by Carlo Luigi Spegazzini. It has cosmopolitan distribution.

== Species ==
- Amerosporium atrum (Fuckel) Höhn., 1915
- Amerosporium caricum
- Amerosporium concinnum Petr., 1953
- Amerosporium congregatum (Cooke) Sacc., 1884
- Amerosporium platense Speg., 1902
- Amerosporium polynematoides Speg., 1882
