= Septotinia =

Scientific classification
- Kingdom: Fungi
- Division: Ascomycota
- Class: Leotiomycetes
- Order: Helotiales
- Family: Sclerotiniaceae
- Genus: Septotinia; Whetzel ex J.W. Groves & M.E. Elliott

Type species
- Septotinia podophyllina (Ellis & Everh.) Whetzel

Genus of fungi

Septotinia is a genus of fungi in the family Sclerotiniaceae.
