= Amphobotrys =

Scientific classification
- Kingdom: Fungi
- Division: Ascomycota
- Class: Leotiomycetes
- Order: Helotiales
- Family: Sclerotiniaceae
- Genus: Amphobotrys; Hennebert
- Species: A. ricini

Binomial name
- Amphobotrys ricini (N.F.Buchw.) Hennebert (1973)

Synonyms
- Botrytis ricini N.F.Buchw. (1949)

Genus of fungi

Amphobotrys ricini is a species of fungus in the family Sclerotiniaceae. It is a plant pathogen that causes disease on several species including gray mold blight on Euphorbia milii and poinsettia. Originally described as a species of Botrytis in 1949, it was transferred to the genus Amphobotrys in 1973, and it remains the only species in that genus.
