= Myriosclerotinia =

Scientific classification
- Kingdom: Fungi
- Division: Ascomycota
- Class: Leotiomycetes
- Order: Helotiales
- Family: Sclerotiniaceae
- Genus: Myriosclerotinia; N.F. Buchw.

Type species
- Myriosclerotinia scirpicola (Rehm) N.F. Buchw.

Genus of fungi

Myriosclerotinia is a genus of fungi in the family Sclerotiniaceae.
