= Pycnopeziza =

Scientific classification
- Kingdom: Fungi
- Division: Ascomycota
- Class: Leotiomycetes
- Order: Helotiales
- Family: Sclerotiniaceae
- Genus: Pycnopeziza; W.L. White & Whetzel

Type species
- Pycnopeziza sympodialis W.L. White & Whetzel

Genus of fungi

Pycnopeziza is a genus of fungi in the family Sclerotiniaceae.
