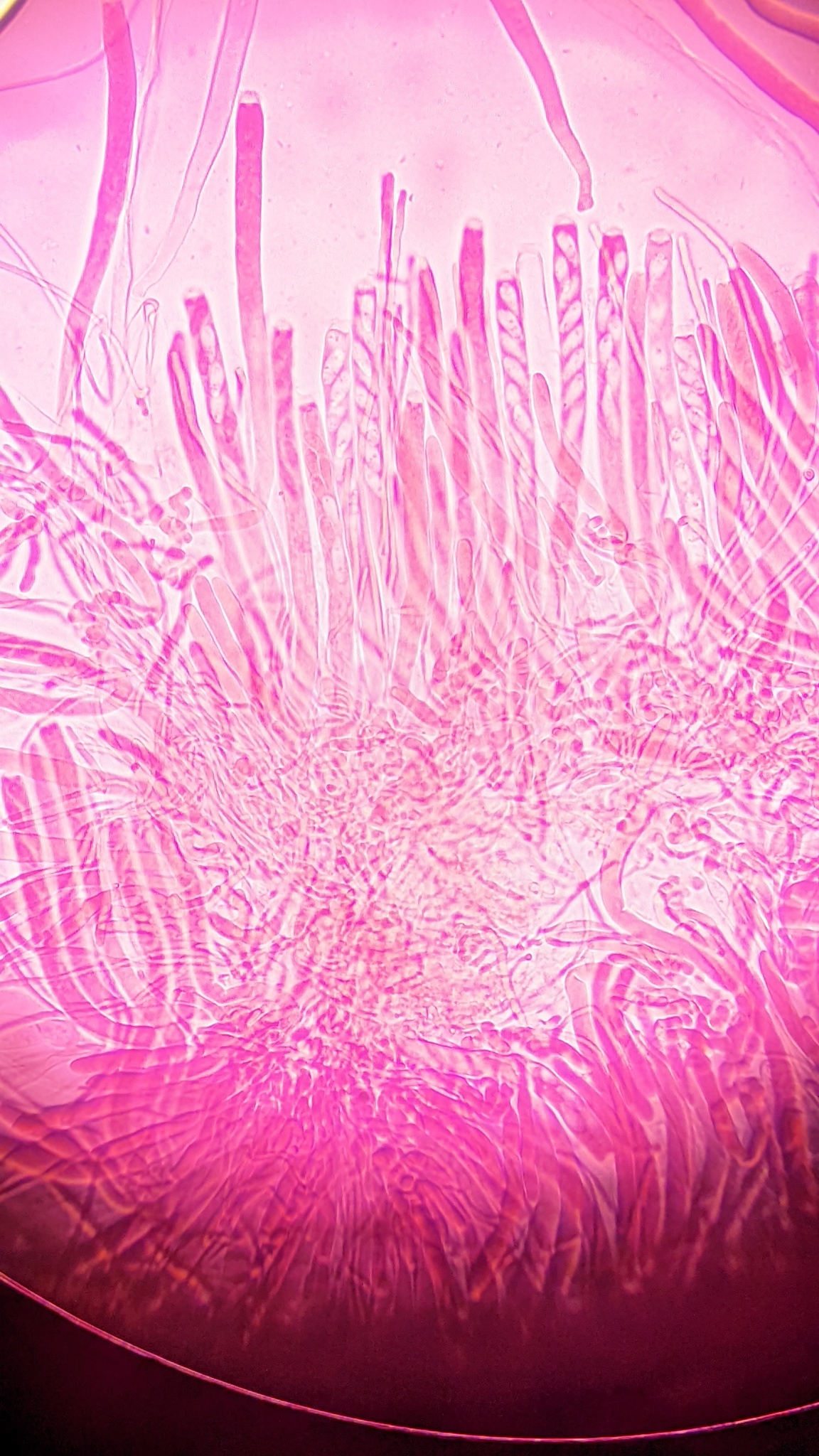

Scientific classification
- Kingdom: Fungi
- Division: Ascomycota
- Class: Leotiomycetes
- Order: Helotiales
- Family: Sclerotiniaceae
- Genus: Ciborinia; Whetzel

Type species
- Ciborinia bifrons (Whetzel) Whetzel

= Ciborinia =

Genus of fungi

Ciborinia is a genus of fungi in the family Sclerotiniaceae.
