= Asterocalyx =

Scientific classification
- Kingdom: Fungi
- Division: Ascomycota
- Class: Leotiomycetes
- Order: Helotiales
- Family: Sclerotiniaceae
- Genus: Asterocalyx; Höhn.

Type species
- Asterocalyx mirabilis Höhn.

Genus of fungi

Asterocalyx is a genus of fungi in the family Sclerotiniaceae.
