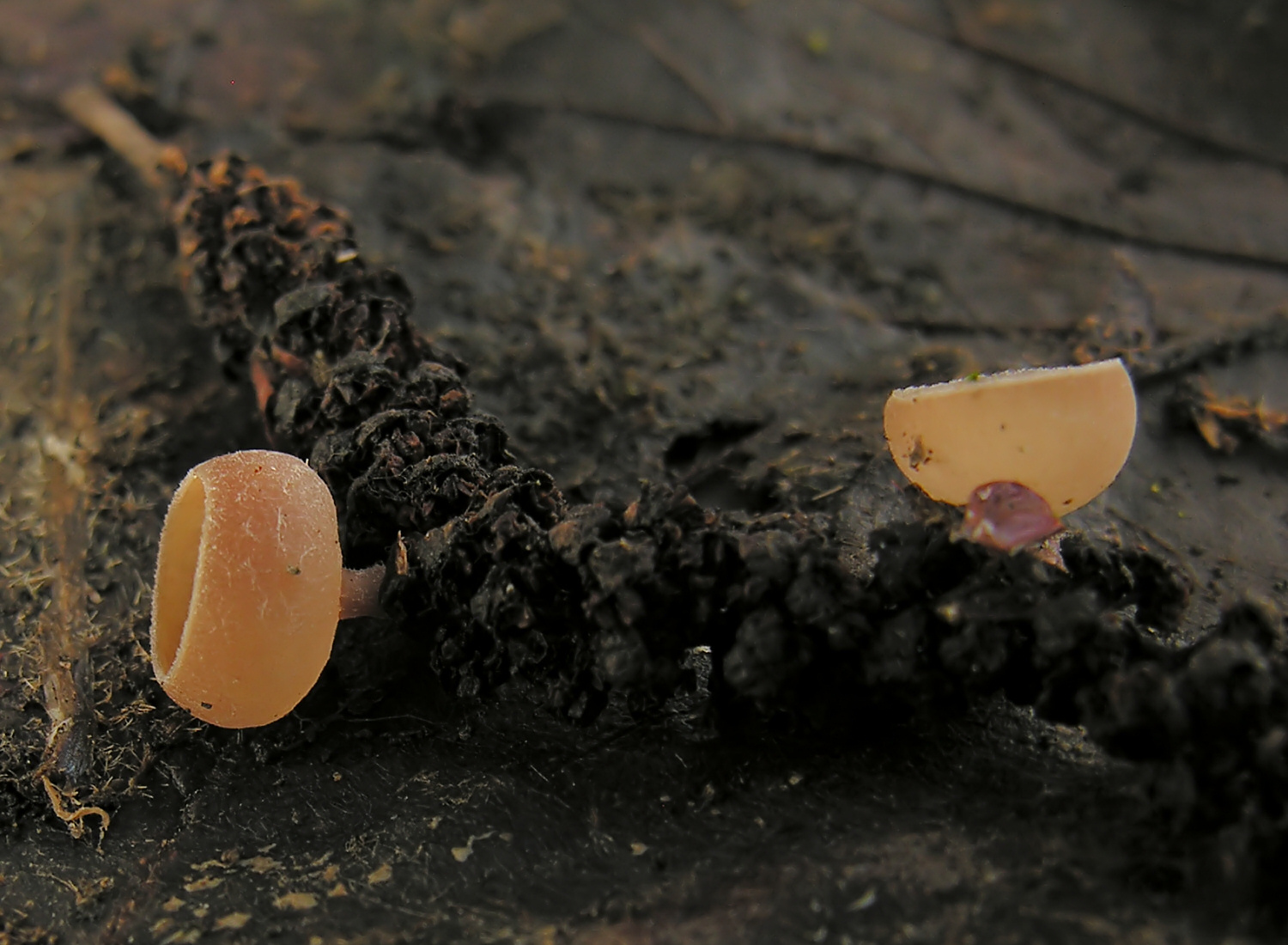
- Ciboria amentacea

Scientific classification
- Kingdom: Fungi
- Division: Ascomycota
- Class: Leotiomycetes
- Order: Helotiales
- Family: Sclerotiniaceae
- Genus: Ciboria; Fuckel (1870)

Type species
- Ciboria caucus (Rebent.) Fuckel (1870)

Synonyms
- Ciboriopsis Dennis (1962); Moellerodiscus Henn. (1902)

= Ciboria =

Genus of fungi

Ciboria is a genus of fungi in the family Sclerotiniaceae. The widespread genus, which currently contains about 21 species, was circumscribed by the German botanist Karl Fuckel in 1870.

== Species ==
- Ciboria acerina
- Ciboria aestivalis
- Ciboria alni
- Ciboria amentacea
- Ciboria americana
- Ciboria aschersoniana
- Ciboria batschiana
- Ciboria betulae
- Ciboria carunculoides
- Ciboria caucus
- Ciboria cistophila
- Ciboria juncorum
- Ciboria rufofusca
- Ciboria seminicola
- Ciboria shiraiana
- Ciboria viridifusca
