= Coprotinia =

Scientific classification
- Kingdom: Fungi
- Division: Ascomycota
- Class: Leotiomycetes
- Order: Helotiales
- Family: Sclerotiniaceae
- Genus: Coprotinia; Whetzel

Type species
- Coprotinia minutula Whetzel

Genus of fungi

Coprotinia is a genus of fungi in the family Sclerotiniaceae. This is a monotypic genus, containing the single species Coprotinia minutula.
