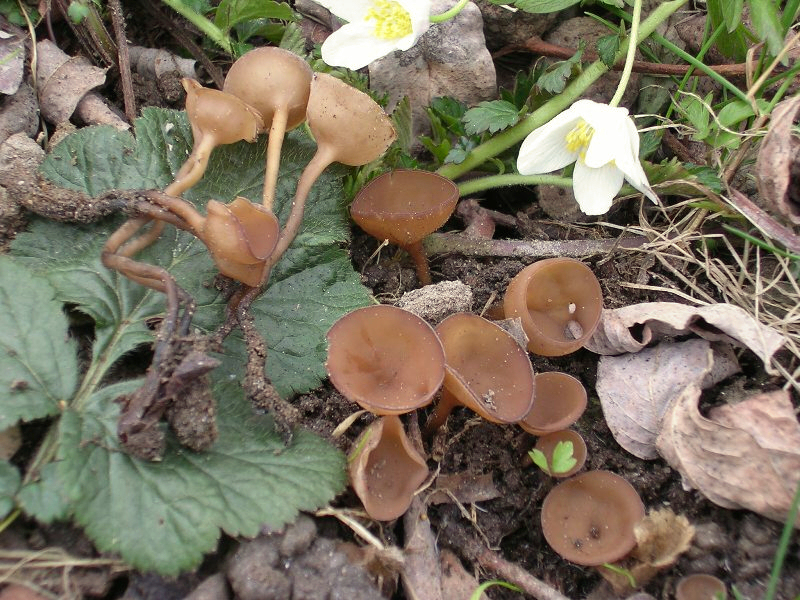
- Dumontinia tuberosa

Scientific classification
- Kingdom: Fungi
- Division: Ascomycota
- Class: Leotiomycetes
- Order: Helotiales
- Family: Sclerotiniaceae
- Genus: Dumontinia; L.M.Kohn (1979)

Type species
- Dumontinia tuberosa (Bull.) L.M.Kohn (1979)

Synonyms
- Peziza tuberosa Bull., Hist. Champ. Fr. (Paris) 1(2): 266 (1791); Rutstroemia tuberosa (Bull.) P. Karst., Bidr. Känn. Finl. Nat. Folk 19: 105 (1871); Aleuria rapulum var. tuberosa (Bull.) Gillet, Champignons de France, Discom.(2): 38 (1879); Hymenoscyphus tuberosus (Bull.) W. Phillips [as 'Hymenoscypha'], Man. Brit. Discomyc. (London): 113 (1887); Peziza tuberosa subsp. radicata (Reichard) N. Lund, Consp. Hymen. Holm (Christianiae): 113 (1845); Octospora tuberosa Hedw., Descr. micr.-anal. musc. frond. (Lipsiae) 2: 34, tab. 10B, fig. 1-7 (1789); Peziza tuberosa (Hedw.) Dicks., Fasc. pl. crypt. brit. (London) 2: 25 (1790); Macroscyphus tuberosus (Hedw.) Gray, Nat. Arr. Brit. Pl. (London) 1: 672 (1821); Sclerotinia tuberosa (Hedw.) Fuckel, Jb. nassau. Ver. Naturk. 23-24: 331 (1870); Helotium tuberosum (Hedw.) P. Karst., Not. Sällsk. Fauna et Fl. Fenn. Förh. 11: 233 (1871); Whetzelinia tuberosa (Hedw.) Korf & Dumont, Mycologia 64(2): 250 (1972); Peziza tuberosa var. communis Alb. & Schwein., Consp. fung. (Leipzig): 313 (1805); Peziza tuberosa f. strobilina Fr., Syst. mycol. (Lundae) 2(1): 58 (1822); Sclerotinia tuberosa f. pallida Henn., Verh. bot. Ver. Prov. Brandenb. 40: xxvii (1898)

= Dumontinia =

Genus of fungi

Dumontinia is a fungal genus in the family Sclerotiniaceae. The genus is monotypic, containing the single species Dumontinia tuberosa, found in Europe.

The genus name of Dumontinia is in honour of Kent Parsons Dumont (b.1941), an American botanist (Mycology) from the New York Botanical Garden.

The genus was circumscribed by Linda M.Kohn in Mycotaxon Vol.9 (Issue 2) on page 432 in 1979.
