= Kohninia =

Scientific classification
- Kingdom: Fungi
- Division: Ascomycota
- Class: Leotiomycetes
- Order: Helotiales
- Family: Sclerotiniaceae
- Genus: Kohninia; Holst-Jensen, Vrålstad & T. Schumach.

Type species
- Kohninia linnaeicola Holst-Jensen, Vrålstad & T. Schumach.

Genus of fungi

Kohninia is a genus of fungi in the family Sclerotiniaceae. This is a monotypic genus, containing the single species Kohninia linnaeicola.
