= Wenyingia sichuanensis =

Scientific classification
- Domain: Eukaryota
- Kingdom: Fungi
- Division: Ascomycota
- Class: Pezizomycetes
- Order: Pezizales
- Family: Pyronemataceae
- Genus: Wenyingia; Zheng Wang & Pfister
- Species: W. sichuanensis

Binomial name
- Wenyingia sichuanensis Zheng Wang & Pfister

Genus of fungi

Wenyingia is a fungal genus in the family Pyronemataceae. A monotypic genus, it contains the single species Wenyingia sichuanensis, found in 1997 in the western Sichuan Province in China. The specific epithet is named for Professor Wenying Zhuang, mycologist at the Chinese Academy of Sciences. A cup fungus, its distinctive feature is a very thin spider-web membrane that covers the hymenium.
