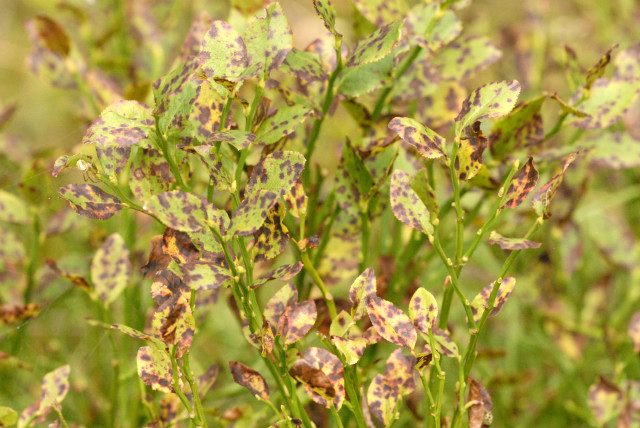
- Valdensinia heterodoxa on a Vaccinium species

Scientific classification
- Kingdom: Fungi
- Division: Ascomycota
- Class: Leotiomycetes
- Order: Helotiales
- Family: Sclerotiniaceae
- Genus: Valdensinia; Peyronel

Type species
- Valdensinia heterodoxa Peyronel

= Valdensinia =

Genus of fungi

Valdensinia is a genus of fungi in the family Sclerotiniaceae. It is a monotypic genus, containing the single species Valdensinia heterodoxa.
