= Poculina =

Scientific classification
- Kingdom: Fungi
- Division: Ascomycota
- Class: Leotiomycetes
- Order: Helotiales
- Family: Sclerotiniaceae
- Genus: Poculina; Spooner

Genus of fungi

Poculina is a genus of fungi in the family Sclerotiniaceae.
