= Brian Spooner (mycologist) =

British scientist

Brian Martin Spooner (born 1951) is an English mycologist who was head of mycology at the Royal Botanic Gardens, Kew.

He was born in Rochford, Essex. in 1951. He obtained his first degree in 1972 from the University of London. He joined the staff at the Herbarium, Kew in 1975 to undertake a study of ascomycetes under the guidance of Dr R W G Dennis, who had retired that year. He had a long term research project on the inoperculate Discomycetes of Australia. He was promoted to Higher Scientific Officer in 1979 and awarded a Ph.D. from Reading University in 1985 for his thesis "Helotiales of Australasia". He was appointed head of mycology in 1998.

He is the author of several books and over 200 research papers. His main research interest was with the discomycetes, but he also did research on other ascomycetous groups, as well as other British fungi. His work at Kew additionally included routine identifications and curation of the Ascomycetes Reference Collection. He was responsible for moving the mycology collection from the herbarium to the Jodrell Laboratory.

He has participated in field expeditions and biodiversity projects in Malaysia and Australia.

He regularly leads fungus forays for the British Mycological Society, on Box Hill, and in Surrey.

In 1990 he was honoured by a new genus named for him, Spooneromyces.

He retired in 2011 after 36 years at Kew.

He married Linda Strang in 1975 and lives in West Molesey.

== Selected publications ==
- Helotiales of Australasia: Geoglossaceae, Orbiliaceae, Sclerotiniaceae, Hyaloscyphaceae. Bibliotheca Mycologica, 116. Brian Spooner. 1987. Gebruder Borntraeger Verlagsbuchhandlung ISBN 9783443590178
- Mushrooms: the new compact study guide and identifier. David N. Pegler, Brian Spooner, 1994. ISBN 9780785800484
- British Puffballs, Earthstars and Stinkhorns; an account of the British gasteroid fungi. David N. Pegler, Brian Spooner, Thomas Læssøe. 1995. ISBN 9780947643812
- Mushrooms & Toadstools of Britain and Europe. Brian Spooner. 1996. Harper Collins ISBN 9780002200073
- British Chanterelles and Tooth Fungi. David N. Pegler, Peter Roberts, Brian Spooner 1997. ISBN 9781900347150
- Henosepilachna argus (Geoffroy) (Coccinellidae, Epilachninae), a phytophagous ladybird new to the U.K., breeding at Molesey, Surrey. Ian S. Menzies & Brian M. Spooner. 2000. The Coleopterist 9(1) 1-4
- On the unreliability of published DNA sequences. Bridge PD, Roberts PJ, Spooner BM, Panchal G. 2003. New Phytologist 160(1):43-48. doi:10.1046/j.1469-8137.2003.00861.x
- Richard William George Dennis (1910–2003): Mycologist and savant. Spooner, B. & Roberts, P. (2004). Mycological Research, 108(9), 1097-1104. doi:10.1017/S0953756204000711
- Mushrooms & Toadstools: Get to Know the Natural World (Collins Wild Guide). Brian Spooner. 2005. ISBN 9780007191505
- Checklist of the British and Irish Basidiomycota. G. E. Wickens, N. W. Legon, A. Henrici, P. J. Roberts, B. M. Spooner, R. Watling, Royal Botanic Gardens. 2005. ISBN 9781842461211
- Fungi (Collins New Naturalist #96). Brian Spooner, Peter Roberts. 2007. Harper Collins ISBN 9780002201520
- Checklist of the British & Irish Basidiomycota. Nick Legon, Alick Henrici, Peter Roberts, Brian Spooner, Roy Watling 2014. Royal Botanic Gardens, Kew
- J. M. Despréaux' lichens from the Canary Islands and West Africa: an account of a 19th century collection found in an English archive. Begoña Aguirre-Hudson 1, Isabella Whitworth, Brian M Spooner. 2011. Botanical Journal of the Linnean Society, 166(2) 185–211,
