= Redheadia =

Scientific classification
- Kingdom: Fungi
- Division: Ascomycota
- Class: Leotiomycetes
- Order: Helotiales
- Family: Sclerotiniaceae
- Genus: Redheadia; Y. Suto & Suyama

Type species
- Redheadia quercus Y. Suto & Suyama

Genus of fungi

Redheadia is a genus of fungi in the family Sclerotiniaceae. It is a monotypic genus, containing the single species Redheadia quercus, described in 2005 by Suto and Suyama. R. quercus is the teleomorph form of the fungus Mycopappus quercus, which causes a plant disease called "frosty mildew" in the Sawtooth Oak (Quercus acutissima). The genus is named after Canadian mycologist Scott A. Redhead who first described the anamorph genus Mycopappus, while the specific epithet is named after the genus of the host plant.
