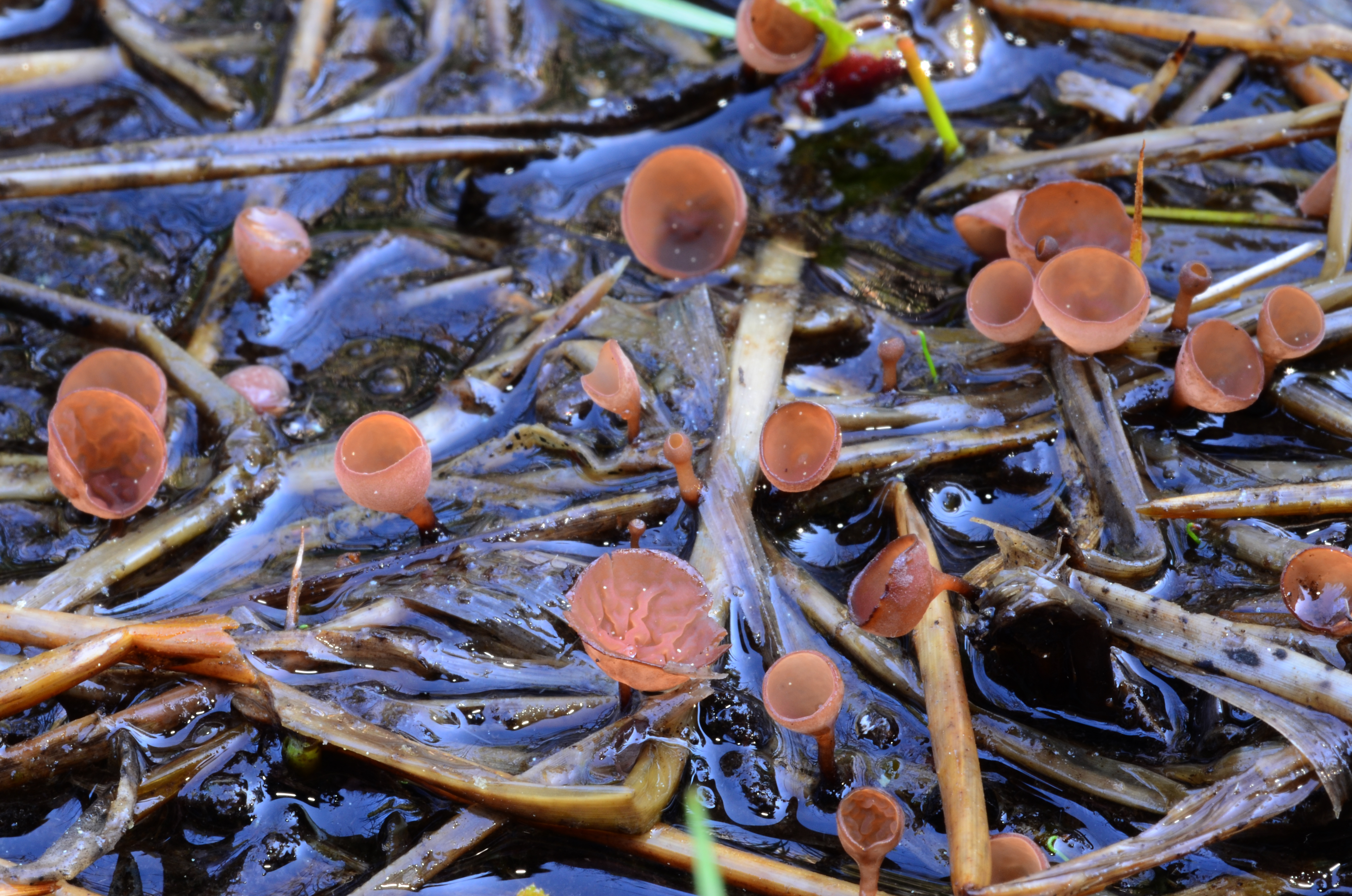
- Sclerotinia sulcata

Scientific classification
- Kingdom: Fungi
- Division: Ascomycota
- Class: Leotiomycetes
- Order: Helotiales
- Family: Sclerotiniaceae
- Genus: Sclerotinia; Fuckel (1870)

Type species
- Sclerotinia libertiana Fuckel (1870)

Species
- See text

= Sclerotinia =

Genus of fungi

Sclerotinia is a genus of fungi in the family Sclerotiniaceae. The widely distributed genus contains 14 species.

== Taxonomy ==
A number of species previously assigned to Sclerotinia are now considered to be members of the closely related genus, Botrytis.

=== Species ===
Selected species include:

- Sclerotinia borealis
- Sclerotinia bulborum (Wakker) Sacc.
- Sclerotinia homoeocarpa F.T. Benn.
- Sclerotinia minor Jagger
- Sclerotinia ricini
- Sclerotinia sclerotiorum (Lib.) de Bary
- Sclerotinia spermophila Noble
- Sclerotinia sulcata (Roberge ex Desm.) Whetzel
- Sclerotinia trifoliorum Erikss.
- Sclerotinia veratri
