= Pseudociboria =

Scientific classification
- Kingdom: Fungi
- Division: Ascomycota
- Class: Leotiomycetes
- Order: Helotiales
- Family: Sclerotiniaceae
- Genus: Pseudociboria; Kanouse

Type species
- Pseudociboria umbrina Kanouse

Genus of fungi

Pseudociboria is a genus of fungi in the family Sclerotiniaceae. This is a monotypic genus, containing the single species Pseudociboria umbrina.
