= Moserella =

Scientific classification
- Missing taxonomy template (fix): Moserella

Type species
- Moserella radicicola Pöder & Scheuer (1994)

Genus of fungi

Moserella is a fungal genus in the family Sclerotiniaceae; according to the 2007 Outline of Ascomycota, its placement in this family is uncertain. This is a monotypic genus, containing the single species Moserella radicicola, described as new to science in 1994 by Reinhold Pöder and Christian Scheuer. The fungus grows in the damaged mycorrhizal root tips of Picea abies.

The genus name of Moserella is in honour of Meinhard Michael Moser(1924-2002), who was an Austrian mycologist.
