= Zoellneria =

Scientific classification
- Kingdom: Fungi
- Division: Ascomycota
- Class: Leotiomycetes
- Order: Helotiales
- Family: Sclerotiniaceae
- Genus: Zoellneria; Velen.

Type species
- Zoellneria rosarum Velen.

Genus of fungi

Zoellneria is a genus of fungi in the family Sclerotiniaceae.

The genus was circumscribed by Josef Velenovský in Monogr. Discom. Bohem. on page 298 in 1934.

The genus name of Zoellneria is in honour of Johann Karl Friedrich Zöllner (1834–1882), who was a German astrophysicist who studied optical illusions. He was also an early psychical investigator.

== Species ==
As accepted by Species Fungorum;

- Zoellneria acerum Velen. (1934)
- Zoellneria callochaetes (Ellis & Everh.) Dennis (1963)
- Zoellneria rosarum Velen. (1934)

Former species;

- Z. clelandii (Hansf.) Dennis (1958) = Hymenotorrendiella clelandii, Helotiaceae family
- Z. eucalypti (Berk.) Dennis (1958) = Hymenotorrendiella eucalypti, Helotiaceae
- Z. madsenii G.W. Beaton & Weste (1977) = Hymenotorrendiella madsenii, Helotiaceae
