= Cudoniopsis =

Scientific classification
- Kingdom: Fungi
- Division: Ascomycota
- Class: Leotiomycetes
- Order: Helotiales
- Family: Sclerotiniaceae
- Genus: Cudoniopsis; Speg.

Type species
- Cudoniopsis pusilla Speg.

Genus of fungi

Cudoniopsis is a genus of fungi in the family Sclerotiniaceae. This is a monotypic genus, containing the single species Cudoniopsis pusilla.
