= Lambertellinia =

Scientific classification
- Kingdom: Fungi
- Division: Ascomycota
- Class: Leotiomycetes
- Order: Helotiales
- Family: Sclerotiniaceae
- Genus: Lambertellinia; Korf & Lizoñ

Type species
- Lambertellinia scutuloides Korf & Lizoň

Genus of fungi

Lambertellinia is a genus of fungi in the family Sclerotiniaceae. This is a monotypic genus, containing the single species Lambertellinia scutuloides.
