= Wenying Zhuang =

Chinese mycologist (born 1948)

- Born: July 27, 1948; Beijing, China
- Citizenship: China
- Education: Shanxi Agricultural University; Chinese Academy of Sciences; Cornell University
- Scientific career
- Fields: Mycology
- Workplaces: Chinese Academy of Sciences
- Doctoral advisor: Richard P. Korf

Wenying Zhuang (July 27, 1948) is a Chinese mycologist. She is known for her contributions to the study of species diversity and phylogeny of Ascomycetes.

== Early life ==
Wenying Zhuang was born and raised in Beijing, China. She is the daughter of Qiaosheng Zhuang, a wheat breeder and academician of the Chinese Academy of Science.

Wenying studied Plant Pathology in the Department of Agronomy at Shanxi Agricultural College (now Shanxi Agricultural University) from 1973 to 1975, and then entered the Graduate School of the Chinese Academy of Sciences (CAS), where she received a Master of Science degree in Mycology in 1985. She continued graduate study in Mycology at Cornell University, earning a Ph.D. in 1987, under Richard P. Korf.

== Career ==
In 1975, Wenying started work as a lecturer at Shanxi Agriculture University. She was appointed as an assistant professor at the Institute of Microbiology Mycology Division of the CAS. After she received her Ph.D., she returned to China and continued her academic career in mycology in the same laboratory at the Institute of Microbiology. She worked as postdoctoral research fellow at Cornell University from July 1990 to January 1991. In 1991 she began working at the Systematic Mycology and Lichenology Laboratory of the Institute of Microbiology, CAS (now upgraded to National Key Laboratory of Mycology.

She has served as the director of Systematic Mycology and Lichenology Laboratory, Institute of Microbiology, CAS for two terms. In 2009, she was elected as a CAS Academiciana. She serves as Associate Editor-in-Chief of the Editorial Committee of Cryptogamic Flora of China, and an Editorial Board Member of international mycological journals Fungal Diversity, Mycotaxon and Phytotaxa. She is an honorary member of the Mycological Society of America, and Executive Committee Member of the International Mycological Association.

On October 19, 2010, Wenying was elected Third World Academy Society (TWAS) Academician in the 21st annual conference.

As a professor in CAS, she has supervised seven doctoral students and two master students.

== Scientific work ==
She worked on wild resource surveys, collections, and study of species diversity of certain groups of Ascomycetes through tropical and northwest areas of China, including Henan, Hubei, Yunnan, Zhejiang, Hainan, Fujian provinces and Taiwan. She continues a phylogeny study on her own collections and Institute of Microbiology specimens.

Another main contribution of her study is molecular phylogeny of Ascomycetes, between species or genera with similar anatomical structures in Otidea, Pyronemataceae, Penicillium, Nectriaceae and Helotiales, utilizing molecular bio-information methods such as ITS, 28S rDNA partial sequencing, and other nucleotide sequence analysis.

She established 9 new genera, 152 new species, and 18 new sub-species and 257 species reports found in China.

== Recognition ==
A genus is named in her honor: Wenyingia, in the family Pyronemataceae. It is a monotypic genus, which contains a single species, Wenyingia sichuanensis, found in western Sichuan Province.

In 1995, Wenying was awarded Third prize of Natural Science from Chinese Academy of Sciences.

== Publications ==
Wenying has published 180 papers, of which 97 are in SCI indexed journals. She has written and published 5 books and chapters in other 8 books so far.

=== Selected books ===
- Zhuang, Wen-Ying (2001). Higher Fungi of Tropical China. Mycotaxon Limited. ISBN 9780930845131.
- Ainsworth, Geoffrey Clough (2008). Ainsworth & Bisby's Dictionary of the Fungi (10 ed.). CABI. ISBN 9780851998268.

=== Selected articles ===
- Zhuang, W. Y. (2005). "Re-disposition of specimens filed under Lachnea in HMAS" (PDF). Fungal Diversity. 18: 211–224.
- Zhuang, W.y., ed. (2005). "Fungi of Northwestern China".
- Liu CY, Zhuang WY (2006). "Relationships among some members of the genus Otidea (Pezizales, Pyronemataceae)" (PDF). Fungal Diversity. 23: 181–192.
- Wang, Long; Zhuang, Wen-Ying (March 2007). "Phylogenetic analyses of penicillia based on partial calmodulin gene sequences". Bio Systems. 88 (1–2): 113–126. Bibcode:2007BiSys..88..113W. doi:10.1016/j.biosystems.2006.04.008. ISSN 0303-2647. PMID 16860929.
- Zhuang, Wen-ying; Nong, Ye; Luo, Jing (2007). "New species and new Chinese records of Bionectriaceae and Nectriaceae (Hypocreales, Ascomycetes) from Hubei, China". Fungal Diversity. 24: 347–357.
- Li, W.y.; Zhuang, W.y. (2007). "Re-examinations of Botryosphaeriaceae (Dothideomycetes) on deposit in HMAS. ----中国科学院微生物研究所". Mycotaxon. 100: 209–220. doi:10.5962/p.419230.
- Zhuang, W. Y.; He, X.s. (2007-05-15). "产生担子器的担子菌一新科". Mycosystema (in Chinese and English). 26 (3): 339–342. ISSN 1672-6472.

== See also ==
- List of mycologists
