= Herbert Hice Whetzel =

American mycologist and plant pathologist

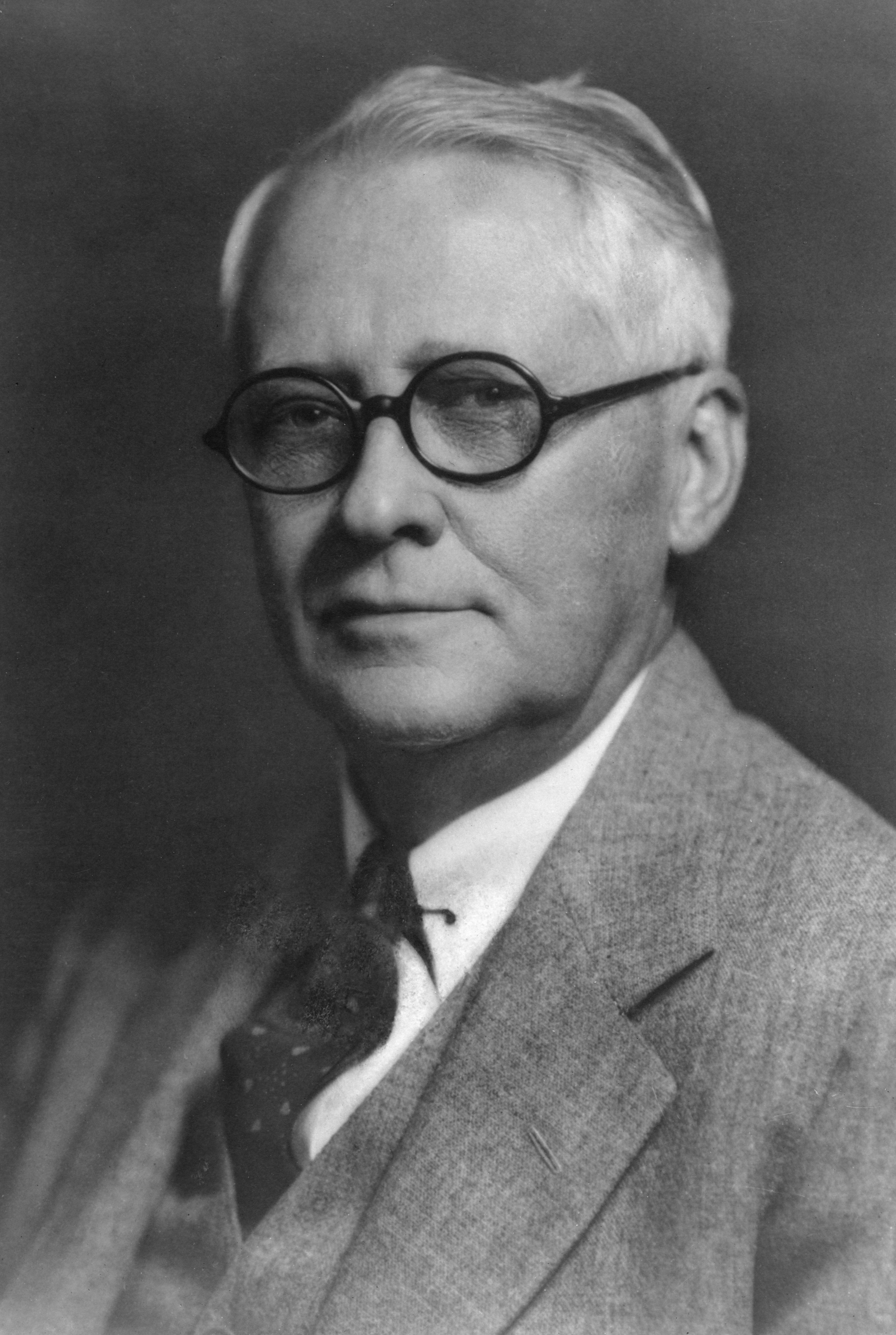
- Whetzel in 1937
- Born: September 5, 1877; Avilla, Indiana, United States
- Died: November 30, 1944 (aged 67); Ithaca, New York, U.S.
- Occupations: Professor, phytopathologist, mycologist
- Spouse(s): Lucy E. Baker (d.1912), Bertha A. Baker (d.1939)
- Children: Gertrude O. Grover, Joseph C. Whetzel
- Parent(s): Joseph Conrad Whetzel, Gertrude (Eckles) Whetzel

Herbert Hice Whetzel (September 5, 1877 – November 30, 1944) was an American plant pathologist and mycologist. As a professor of plant pathology, he led the first department of plant pathology at an American university and founded the Cornell Plant Pathology Herbarium (CUP).

== Background and education ==
H. H. Whetzel was born near Avilla, Indiana, where he spent his boyhood on the family farm. A nature lover and collector from an early age, he taught school for two years after graduating high school, then earned a bachelor's degree at Wabash College. After graduating from Wabash College in 1902, he attended graduate school at Cornell University, where he studied under the prominent mycologist George F. Atkinson. In 1904 he married Lucy E. Baker. They had two children, Joseph and Gertrude; Lucy died in 1912. In 1914 he married Lucy's sister Bertha A. Baker, and they raised the children together in Ithaca, New York.

== Career ==
While still working on his doctoral research, Whetzel was hired by Liberty Hyde Bailey to do extension work for Cornell's College of Agriculture and Life Sciences. In 1906, Whetzel was appointed Assistant Professor of Botany, and in 1907, he became the Head Professor of the newly created Department of Plant Pathology. A quirk of Cornell's rules prevented him from officially receiving his PhD, but he was later awarded honorary D.Sc. degrees from Wabash College and the University of Puerto Rico. His students included M. F. Barrus and Charles Chupp, who both went on to Teach at Cornell and who shared Whetzel's conviction of the importance of Extension work as well as Carlos E. Chardón, who became a Government Minister and Chancellor of the University of Puerto Rico.

Whetzel studied sclerotium-producing cup fungi, and published a monograph of genera in the family Sclerotiniaceae. He was a charter member of the American Phytopathological Society, authored more than 300 publications, and was instrumental in founding and developing the Cornell Plant Pathology Herbarium (CUP), where his fungus collections are stored. He was a pioneer in documenting the Fungi of Puerto Rico (1916) and Bermuda (1920–1921). At the end of his life he issued the exsiccata like series Bermuda Fungi, specimens no. 101 to no. 200 distributed by J. M. Waterston after his death.

Whetzel died in Ithaca, New York, at the age of 67. He had resided in the Forest Home area of Ithaca for over 30 years.

== See also ==
- List of mycologists
