= Jan Hendrik Wakker =

Botanist (1859–1927)

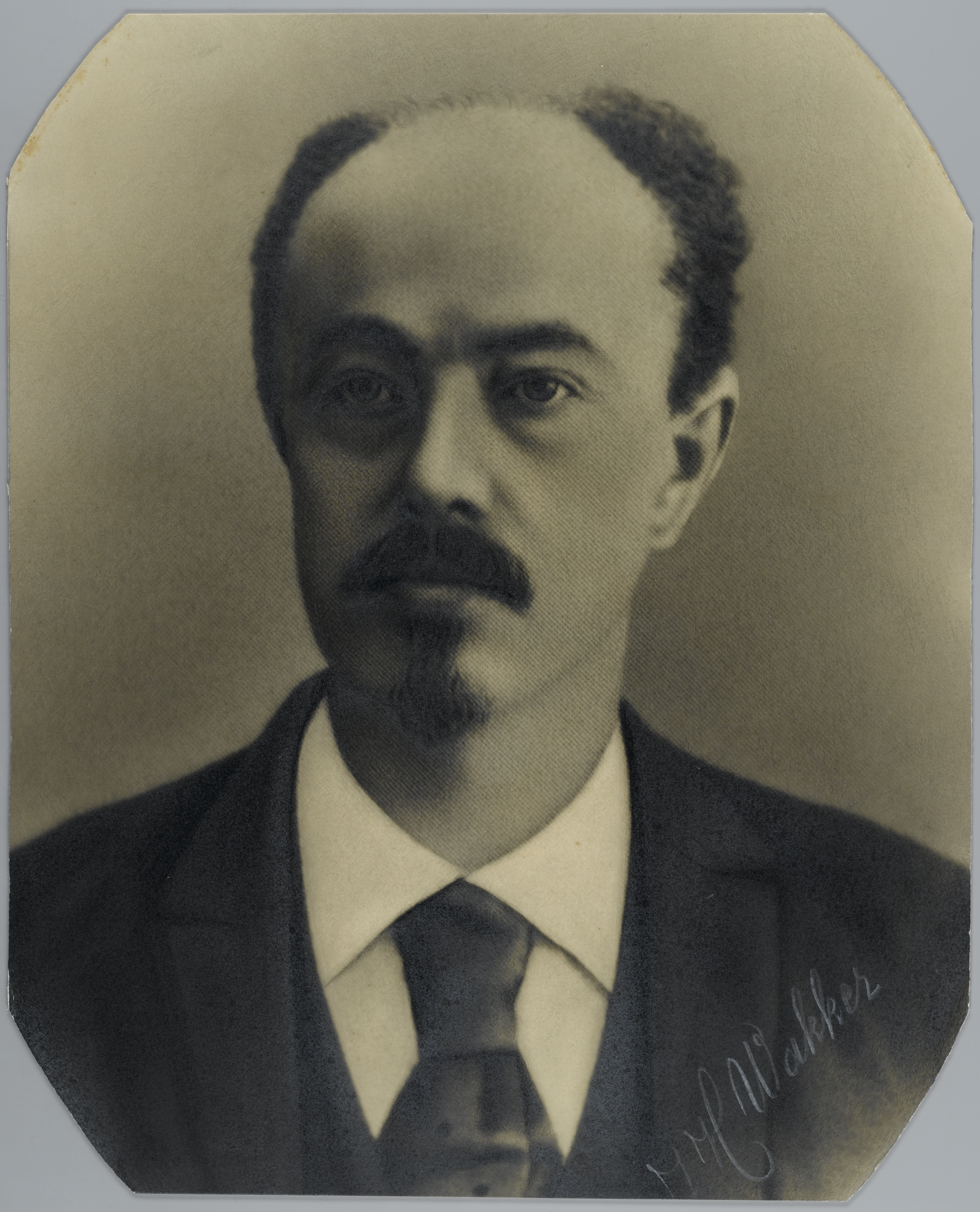
Possible image of Jan Hendrik Wakker

Jan Hendrik Wakker (28 June 1859 – 26 July 1927) was a Dutch botanist and plant pathologist. He worked as a director of the sugarcane experimental station in Pasoeroean from 1892 to 1897.

Wakker was born in Amsterdam and went to school along with included J.M. Janse, Jacques Perk and Willem Kloos. He then went to study under Hugo de Vries and J.C Costerus and received a doctorate in 1885 with research on adventitious buds. He then worked with Hugo de Vries, examining a disease of hyacinths caused by bacteria. He was among the first to demonstrate bacterial infections in plants. He then studied another disease of hyacinth caused by Peziza bulborum. Another disease was later found to be caused by a nematode. In 1886 the bulbgrower's society did not fund the position that Wakker worked in. In 1887 he became an assistant at the botanical laboratory in Utrecht and in 1889 he began to teach in the Zuivelschool at Alphen-Oudshoorn. In 1892 he received an appointment as director in the Dutch East Indies sugarcane experimental station in Pasoeroean where he worked for five years. Here he examined diseases of sugarcane and studied flowering and plant genetics. He returned to the Netherlands and began to teach at gymnasium in 's-Hertogenbosch from 1897. In 1905 he was offered a directorship at the Willie Commelin Scholten Phytopathology Laboratory but he did not accept it.
