= Streptotinia =

Scientific classification
- Kingdom: Fungi
- Division: Ascomycota
- Class: Leotiomycetes
- Order: Helotiales
- Family: Sclerotiniaceae
- Genus: Streptotinia; Whetzel

Type species
- Streptotinia arisaemae Whetzel

Genus of fungi

Streptotinia is a genus of fungi in the family Sclerotiniaceae.
