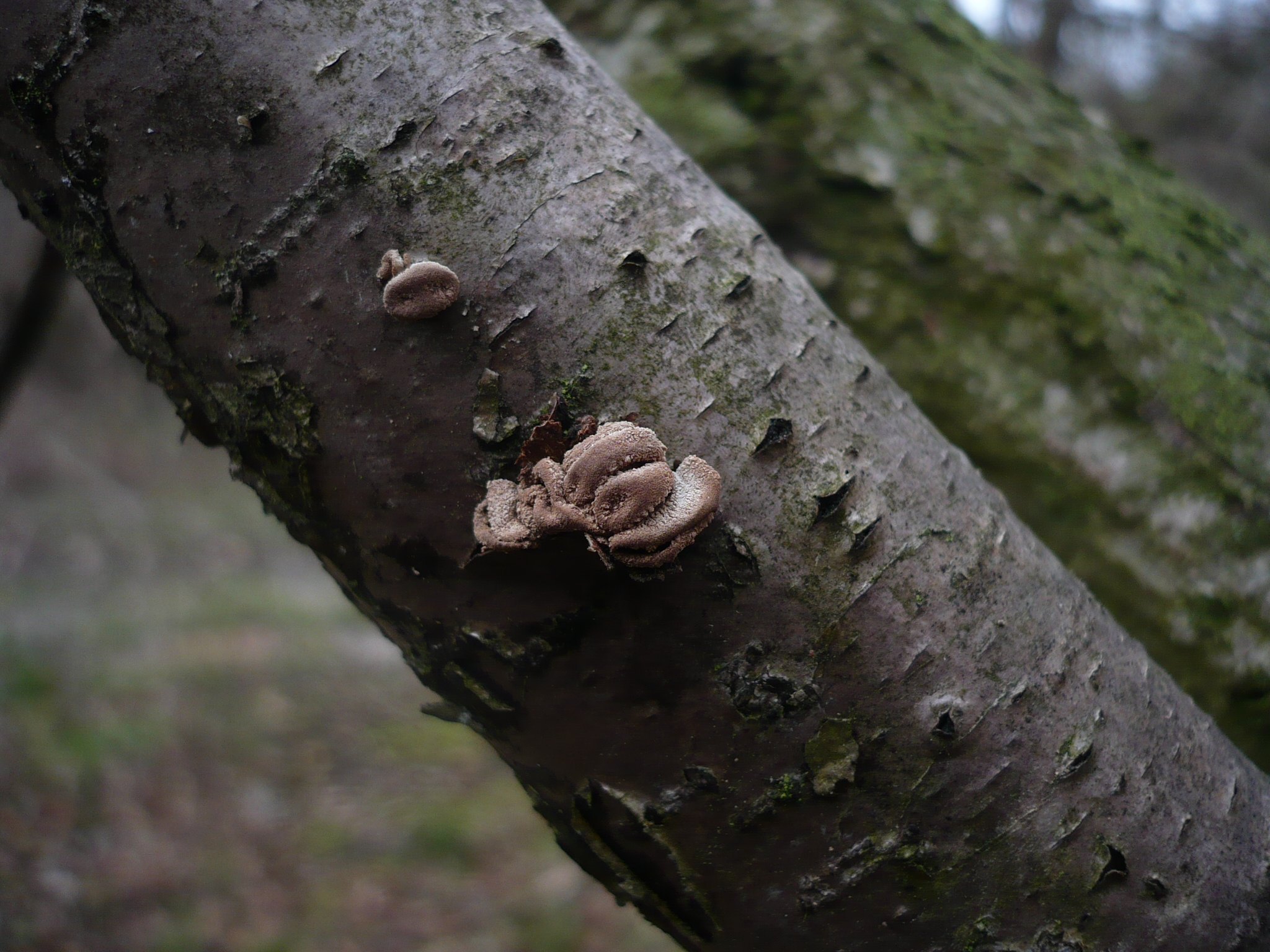
- Encoelia furfuracea

Scientific classification
- Kingdom: Fungi
- Division: Ascomycota
- Class: Leotiomycetes
- Order: Helotiales
- Family: Cenangiaceae
- Genus: Encoelia (Fr.) P.Karst. (1871)

Type species
- Encoelia furfuracea (Roth) P.Karst. (1871)

Synonyms
- Peziza trib. Encoelia Fr. (1822); Phibalis Wallr. (1833); Cenangella subgen. Phaeangella Sacc. (1889); Phaeangella (Sacc.) Massee (1895)

= Encoelia =

Genus of fungi

Encoelia is a genus of fungi in the family Sclerotiniaceae.

== Species ==
- Encoelia aterrima
- Encoelia carpini
- Encoelia cubensis
- Encoelia dalongshanica
- Encoelia deightonii
- Encoelia eliassonii
- Encoelia fascicularis
- Encoelia fimbriata
- Encoelia fissa
- Encoelia fuckelii
- Encoelia furfuracea
- Encoelia fuscobrunnea
- Encoelia glaberrima
- Encoelia glauca
- Encoelia helvola
- Encoelia heteromera
- Encoelia himalayensis
- Encoelia impudicella
- Encoelia inculcata
- Encoelia indica
- Encoelia kirschsteiniana
- Encoelia lobata
- Encoelia mollisioides
- Encoelia montana
- Encoelia nebulosa
- Encoelia neocaledonica
- Encoelia nitida
- Encoelia papuana
- Encoelia petrakii
- Encoelia pruinosa
- Encoelia reichenbachii
- Encoelia rubiginosa
- Encoelia russa
- Encoelia salicella
- Encoelia singaporensis
- Encoelia siparia
- Encoelia sitchensis
- Encoelia striatula
- Encoelia tegularis
- Encoelia tiliacea
- Encoelia tristis
- Encoelia ulmi
- Encoelia urceolata
