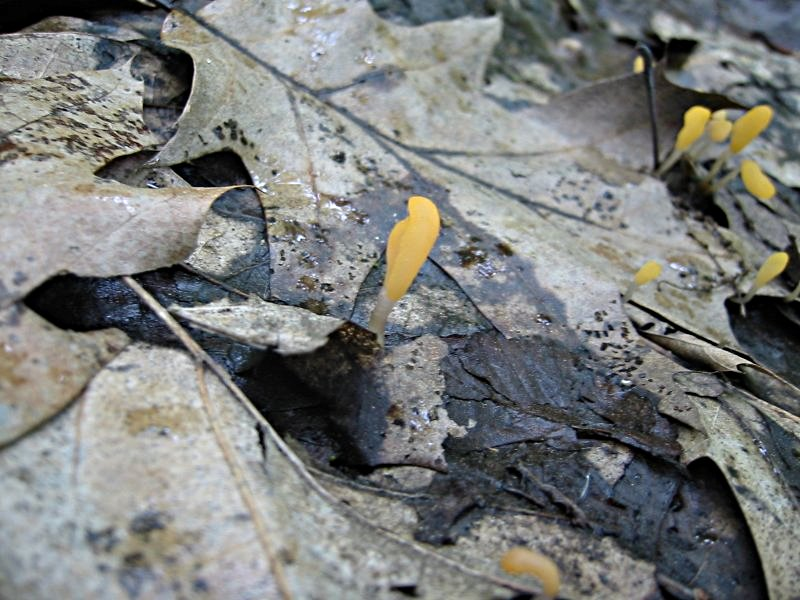
- Mitrula paludosa growing on swamp-leaves in the Middlesex Fells Reservation.

Scientific classification
- Kingdom: Fungi
- Division: Ascomycota
- Class: Leotiomycetes
- Order: Helotiales
- Family: Sclerotiniaceae
- Genus: Mitrula
- Species: M. paludosa

Binomial name
- Mitrula paludosa Fr.

= Mitrula paludosa =

Species of fungus

Mitrula paludosa (syn. Mitrula phalloides), the swamp beacon (US) or bog beacon, (UK) is a species of fungus. It is inedible.

== Habitat ==
These mushrooms are found in swamps and bogs across North America in the cooler climates of south-eastern Canada, New England south to the Mason–Dixon line, and much of the mid-western United States. Also present in Europe from the British Isles to Eastern Europe.

On the West Coast of the United States, the Mitrula elegans looks similar.

== Identification ==
Many related species of Mitrula look identical without microscopic study. The cap or club is yellow with a white stalk (possibly with some pink coloration). It is around 2–3 mm wide, and up to 4 cm tall.
