= Stromatinia =

Scientific classification
- Kingdom: Fungi
- Division: Ascomycota
- Class: Leotiomycetes
- Order: Helotiales
- Family: Sclerotiniaceae
- Genus: Stromatinia; Boud.

Type species
- Stromatinia rapulum (Bull.) Boud.

Genus of fungi

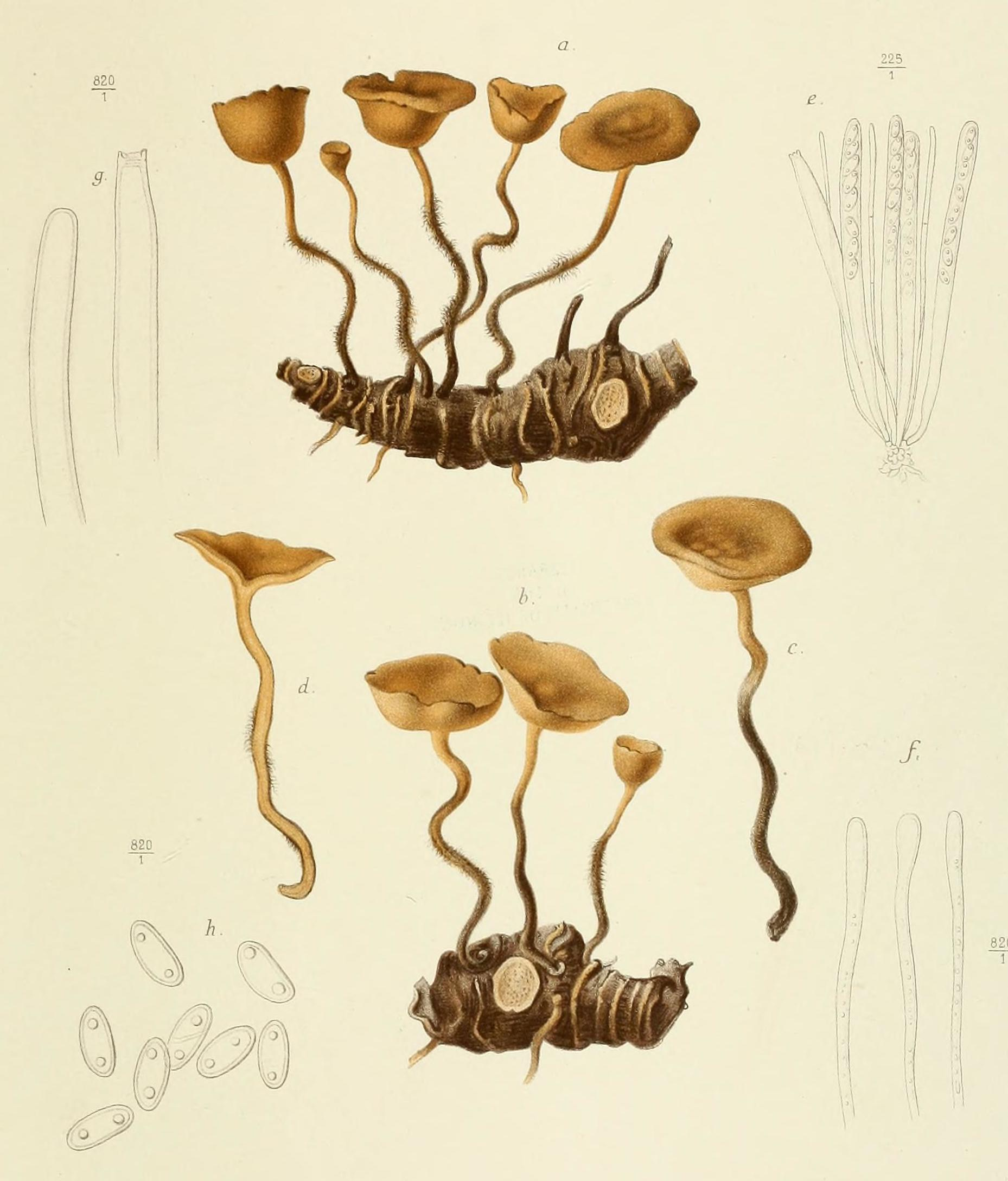
Stromatinia rapulum (illustration by Boudier, 1907)

Stromatinia is a genus of fungi in the family Sclerotiniaceae.
