= Discomycetes =

Former class of fungi

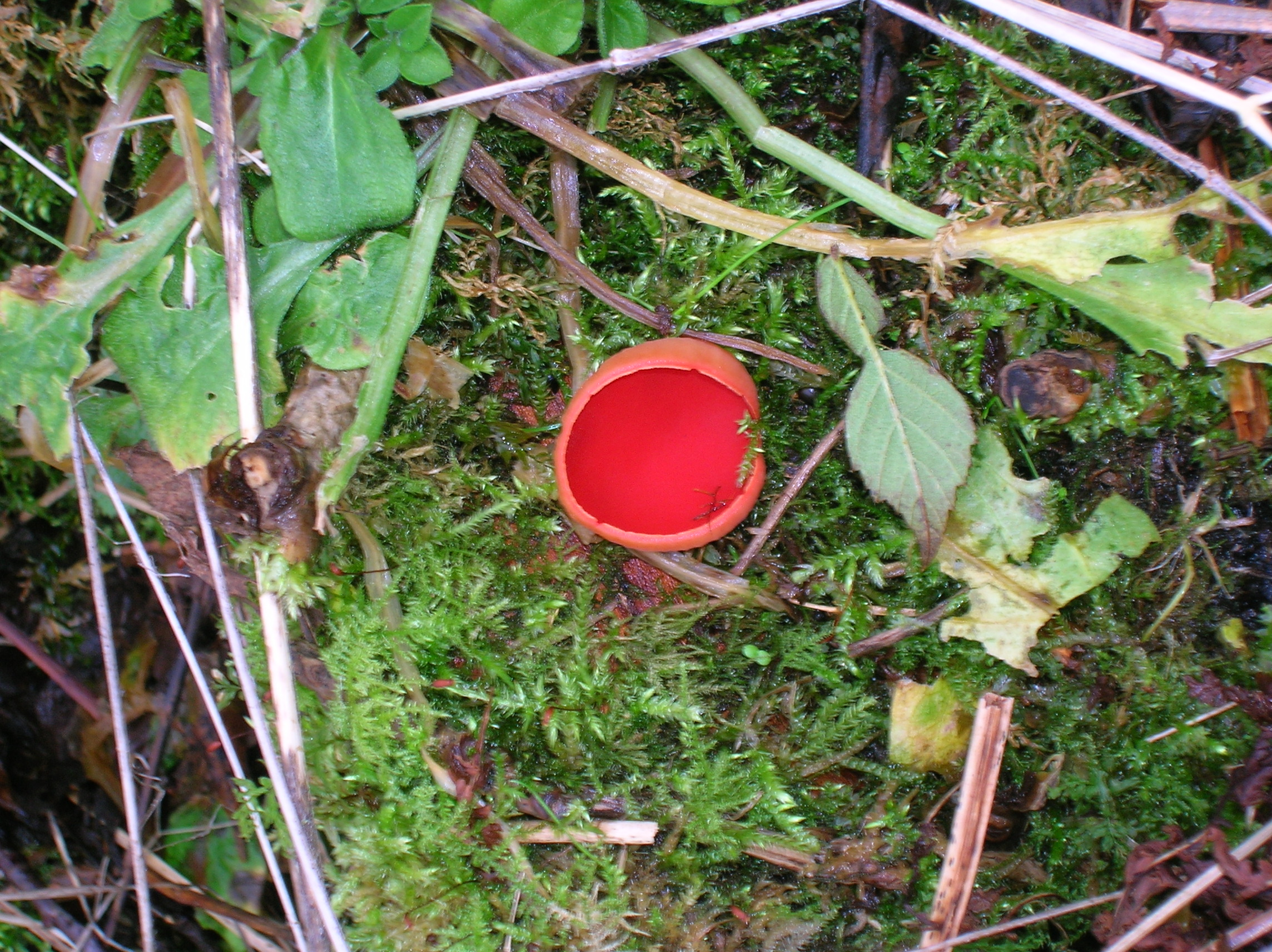
Photograph of a discomycetes.

Discomycetes is a former taxonomic class of Ascomycete fungi which contains all of the cup, sponge and brain fungi, and some club-like fungi. It includes typical cup fungi like the scarlet elf cup and the orange peel fungus, and fungi with fruiting bodies of more unusual shape, such as morels, truffles and the swamp beacon. New taxonomic and molecular data fail to support the monophyly of the Discomycetes.

== Description and features ==
Discomycetes are usually small and cup shaped, and come in singular form.

A common feature of Discomycetes are the asci, which are typically produced on the surface of cup-like fruiting bodies. In most discomycetes, each ascus contains eight sexual spores that are forcibly discharged into the air when mature.

In modern classifications, the members of the obsolete class are included in Pezizomycetes, Lecanoromycetes, Leotiomycetes and Sordariomycetes.
