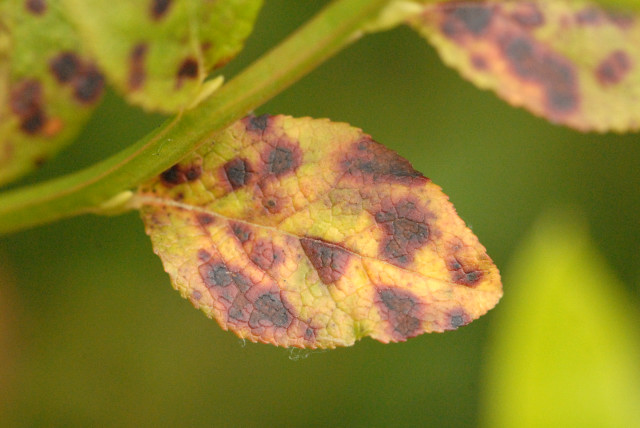
- Valdensinia heterodoxa

Scientific classification
- Kingdom: Fungi
- Division: Ascomycota
- Class: Leotiomycetes
- Order: Helotiales
- Family: Sclerotiniaceae; Whetzel (1945)

Type genus
- Sclerotinia Fuckel

= Sclerotiniaceae =

Family of fungi

The Sclerotiniaceae are a family of fungi in the order Helotiales. Many species in this family are plant pathogens.

== Genera ==
- Amerosporium
- Amphobotrys
- Asterocalyx
- Botryotinia
- Botrytis
- Ciboria
- Ciborinia
- Coprotinia
- Cristulariella
- Cudoniopsis
- Dicephalospora
- Dumontinia
- Elliottinia
- Encoelia
- Grovesinia
- Kohninia
- Lambertellina
- Martininia
- Mitrula
- Mitrulinia
- Monilinia
- Moserella (placement uncertain)
- Myriosclerotinia
- Ovulinia
- Phaeosclerotinia
- Poculina
- Pseudociboria
- Pycnopeziza
- Redheadia
- Sclerocrana
- Sclerotinia
- Seaverinia
- Septotinia
- Streptotinia
- Stromatinia
- Torrendiella
- Valdensinia
- Zoellneria
