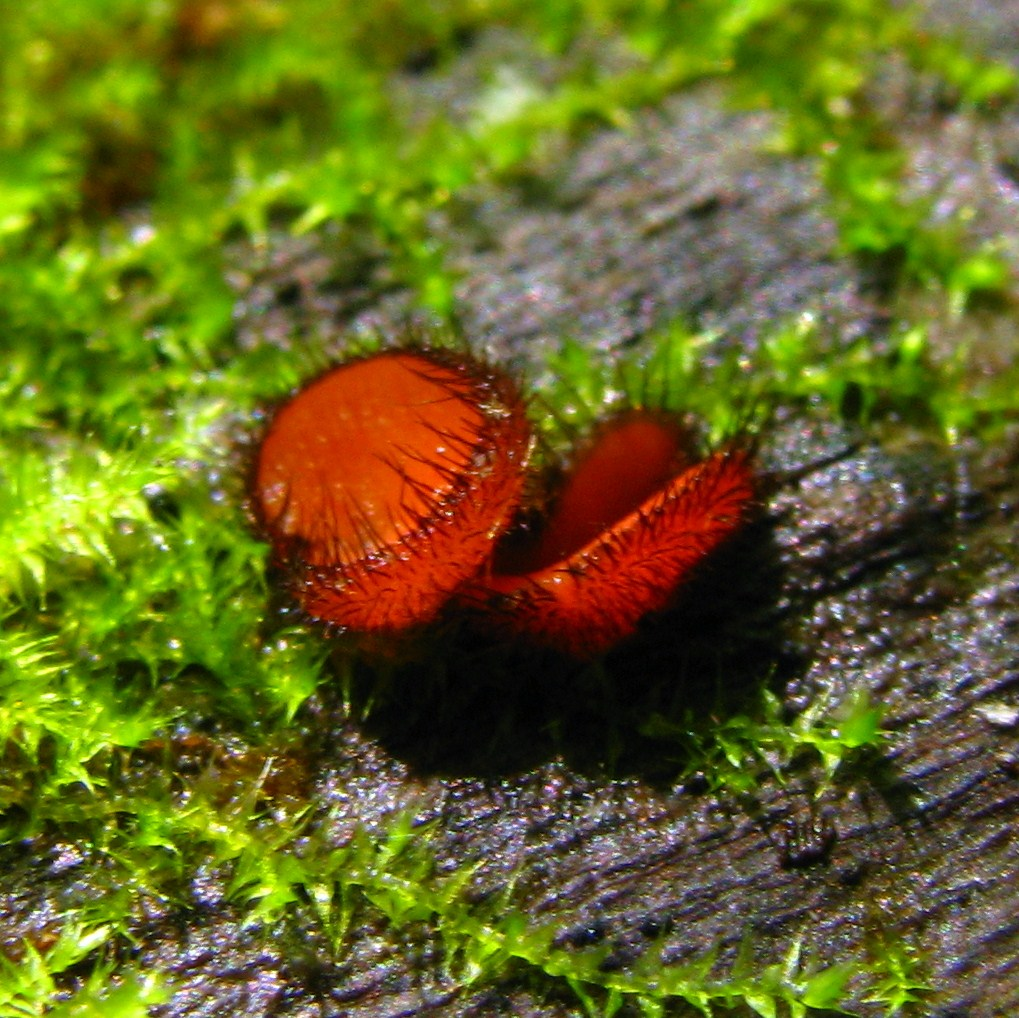

Scientific classification
- Kingdom: Fungi
- Division: Ascomycota
- Class: Pezizomycetes
- Order: Pezizales
- Family: Pyronemataceae
- Genus: Scutellinia
- Species: S. scutellata

Binomial name
- Scutellinia scutellata (L.) Lamb. (1887)

Synonyms
- Patella scutellata (L.) Morgan (1902)

= Scutellinia scutellata =

Species of fungus

Scutellinia scutellata Mycological characteristics
- Smooth hymenium
- Hymenium attachment is not applicable
- Lacks a stipe
- Spore print is white
- Ecology is saprotrophic
- Edibility is inedible

Scutellinia scutellata, commonly known as the eyelash pixie cup, eyelash cup, the Molly eye-winker, the scarlet elf cap, the eyelash fungus or the eyelash pixie cup, is a small saprophytic fungus in the family Pyronemataceae. It is the type species of Scutellinia, as well as being the most common and widespread. The fruiting bodies are small red cups with distinctive long, dark hairs or "eyelashes". These eyelashes are the most distinctive feature and are easily visible with a magnifying glass.

The species is common in North America and Europe, and has been recorded on every continent. It is found on rotting wood and in other damp habitats, typically growing in small groups, sometimes forming clusters. It is sometimes described as inedible, with its small size also rendering it of no culinary interest. Despite this, it is popular among mushroom hunters due to its unusual "eyelash" hairs, making it memorable and easy to identify.

== Taxonomy ==
Scutellinia scutellata was first described in 1753 by Carl Linnaeus in his book Species Plantarum as Peziza scutellata, and it was given its current name by Jean Baptiste Émil Lambotte in Memoires societe royale des sciences de Liege in 1887. It was also named Patella scutellata in 1902. The specific name scutellata is from the Latin for "like a small shield". Common names include the eyelash fungus, the eyelash cup, the scarlet elf cap, the Molly eye-winker and the eyelash pixie cup.

The genus Scutellinia is currently placed in the family Pyronemataceae. However, genera of the Pyronemataceae lack unifying macroscopic or microscopic characteristics; this lack of uniting characters has led various authors to propose a variety of classification schemes. A 1996 study of British specimens of Scutellinia revealed that S. crinita, originally described as Peziza crinita in 1789 by French botanist Pierre Bulliard, was synonymous with S. scutellata.

Scutellinia scutellata is the type species of the genus.

== Description ==
The fruiting body is a shallow disc shape, typically between 0.2 to 1 centimetre (1/8 to 3/8 inch) in diameter. The youngest specimens are almost entirely spherical; the cups open up and expand to a disc during maturity. The inner surface of the cup (the fertile spore-bearing surface, known as the hymenium) is bright orange-red, while the outer surface (the sterile surface) is pale brown. The flesh is red and thin.

The outer surface is covered in dark coloured, stiff hairs, measuring up to 1 cm (3/8 in) in length. At the base, these hairs are up to 40 μm thick, and they taper towards the pointed apices. The hairs form distinctive "eyelashes" on the margin of the cup that are visible to the naked eye. or easily visible through a magnifying glass. S. scutellata is sessile; it does not have a stalk.

=== Microscopic features ===
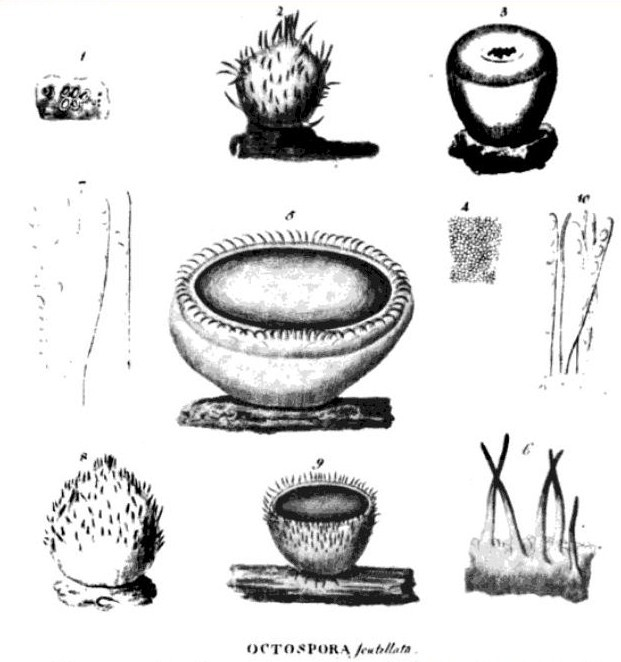
Asci and ascospores of S. scutellata, drawn by Johann Hedwig in 1788

Scutellinia scutellata has asci of approximately 300 μm by 25 μm in size and releases elliptical spores measuring 18 to 19 μm by 10 to 12 μm. The translucent (hyaline) ascospores have a rough exterior, (with very small warts) and contain small droplets of oil. They are white when present in large numbers, like a spore print. The paraphyses are cylindrical in shape and feature septa partitioning the hypha into distinct cells. Electron microscopy of the top of the ascus has revealed a roughly delimited operculum (a flap-like covering of the ascus) and ascostome (a pore in the apex of the ascus), and a subapical ring.

Carotenoids are pigmented molecules found naturally in plants, and some types of fungi, including S. scutellata. A 1965 study reported the carotenoid composition of this fungus, found to contain a high proportion of monocyclic carotenes—carotenes with only one cyclohexene ring, such as beta-carotene. Also present were minor amounts of xanthophyll, a molecule structurally related to the carotenes.

=== Similar species ===
Of more than a dozen species of Scutellinia, S. scutellata is the most common and widespread, though a microscope is required to differentiate between some of them. It is differentiated from most other Scutellinia by its larger size, and its distinctive "eyelashes". Although David Arora describes S. scutellata as "easily recognizable", it can be mistaken for S. umbrarum (which has a larger fruiting body and larger spores, as well as having shorter, less obvious hairs), S. erinaceus (which is slightly smaller, and orange to yellow in colour, with smooth spores), Cheilymenia crucipila (which is much smaller, with short, pale hairs and spores lacking oil droplets), and Melastiza chateri (which is bright orange with small brown hairs). The "Pennsylvania eyelash cup" (S. pennsylvanica) is a smaller North American version that has smaller hairs and spores that are more coarsely warted than S. scutellata. S. barlae is very similar as well, and can only be reliably distinguished by its roughly spherical ascospores that are typically 17–23 μm in diameter.

Species from the genus Lamprospora are smaller and hairless. Similar fungi that favour dung over rotting wood include Cheilymenia coprinaria, C. theleboides, and Coprobia granulata while species such as Anthracobia macrocystis, A. melaloma, Trichophaea abundans, Pyronema omphalodes, Pulvinula carbonaria and P. archeri are cup fungi that favour burned-over ground. Another similar species is Lachnellula arida.

== Distribution and habitat ==
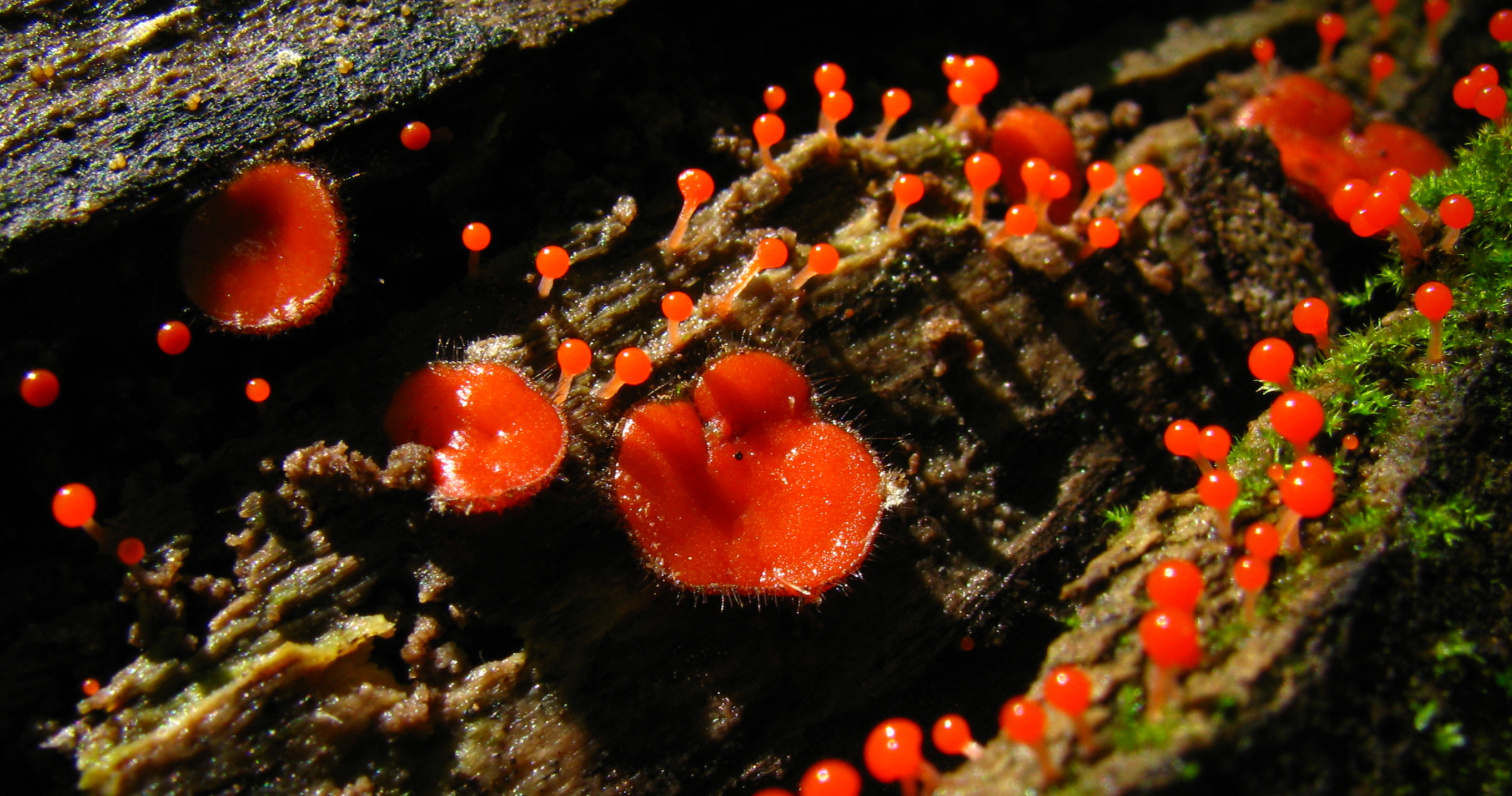
Scutellinia scutellata typically grows in groups on rotten wood.

Scutellinia scutellata is common in both Europe, where it can be found from late spring to late autumn, and North America, where it fruits in winter and spring. It has also been collected in Cameroon, Colombia, East Asia, India, Iceland, Israel, New Guinea and the Solomon Islands, Russia, and Turkey.

A saprobic species, it grows generally in subalpine regions, fruiting on rotten wood and damp soil, and can also sometimes be found on ashes, wet leaves or bracket fungi. In Alaska it has been found growing on humus in the tundra. A six-year study of the succession of fungal flora appearing on freshly cut stumps of poplar trees (Populus canadensis) showed that S. scutellata appeared roughly in the middle of the fungal succession (about 2–4 years after the tree had been cut), along with the species Ascocoryne sarcoides, Scutellinia cervorum, and Lasiosphaeria spermoides. When growing on wood, it is often obscured by surrounding moss. Though sometimes found alone, they typically fruit in groups, sometimes forming dense clusters on rotting wood or other plant detritus.

Due to its small size, it is often overlooked, but mycologist Vera Evenson has observed that "the discovery of the Eyelash Cup is always a great pleasure", due to "the beauty of the eyelashes". Vera McKnight describes it as "a most attractive little fungus", and claims it is easy to notice due to its bright colouration.

== Edibility ==
While some list S. scutellata as inedible, others list it as having an unknown edibility. David Arora considers it too small to be of any culinary interest and it lacks a distinctive smell or taste.
