= Ciliaria =

Ciliaria may refer to:

- Ciliaria, a genus of plants in the family Saxifragaceae, synonym of Saxifraga
- Ciliaria, a genus of plants in the family Cystocloniaceae, synonym of Calliblepharis; see Gigartinales
- Ciliaria, a genus of fungi in the family Pyronemataceae, synonym of Scutellinia
