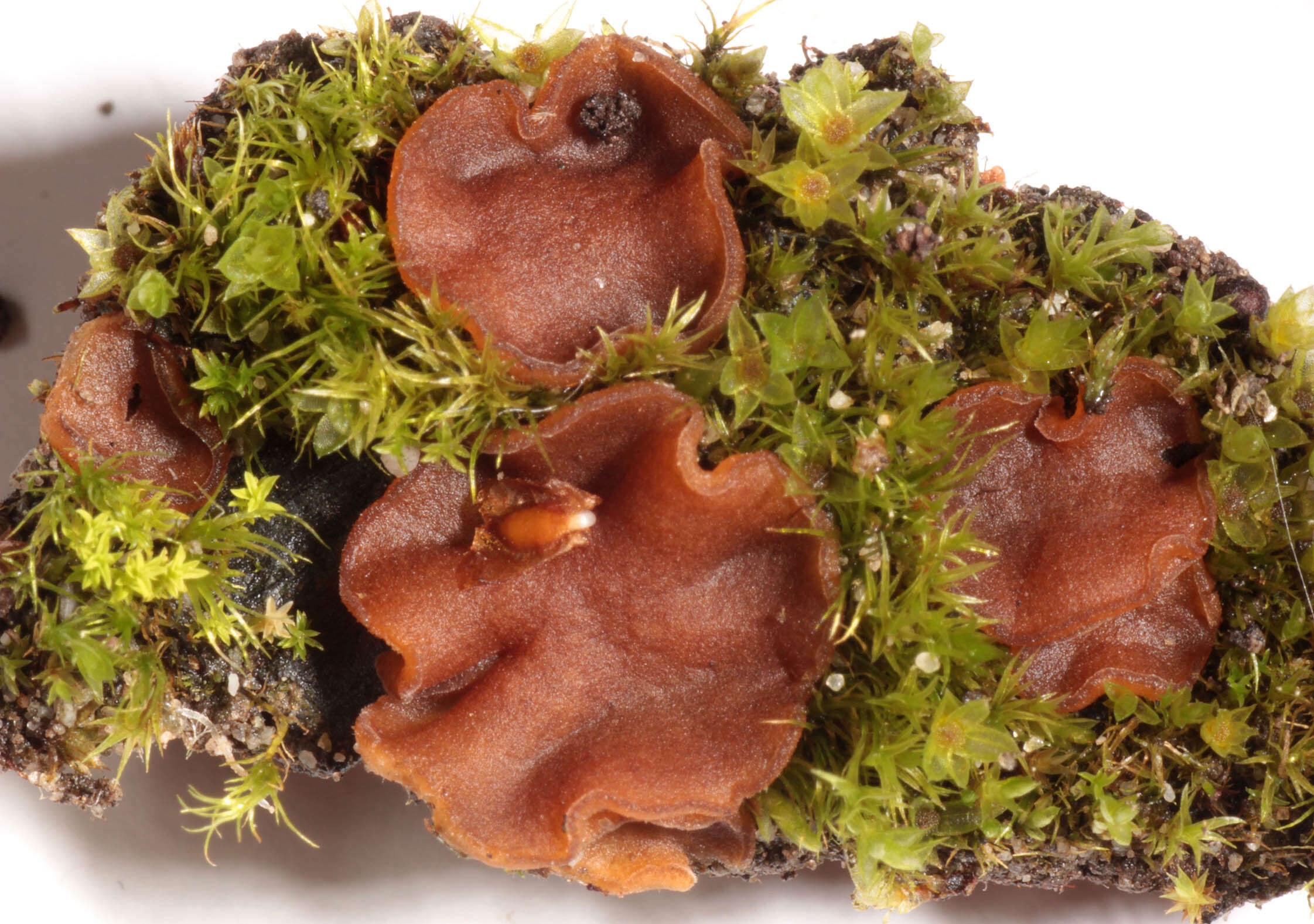

Scientific classification
- Kingdom: Fungi
- Division: Ascomycota
- Class: Pezizomycetes
- Order: Pezizales
- Family: Pyronemataceae
- Genus: Sphaerosporella
- Species: S. brunnea

Binomial name
- Sphaerosporella brunnea (Alb. & Schwein.) Svrček & Kubička

Synonyms
- Sphaerosporella hinnulea; Peziza schizospora; Peziza confusa; Trichophaea brunnea

= Sphaerosporella brunnea =

Fungi species

Sphaerosporella brunnea is a pyrophilic species of small ascomycete cup fungi that commonly makes its habitat on burned substrates. Sphaerosporella brunnea is synonymous with Sphaerosporella hinnulea, Trichophaea brunnea, Peziza brunnea and numerous other fungi due to previously conceived variations in the fungi's habitat, substrate, and color ranging from dark brown to a light yellow-orange, however these differences were soon found to be negligible. S. brunnea is ectomycorrhizal, suspected to be saprobic, and is thought to be commonly widely distributed in Australia, Asia, the eastern United States and parts of Europe, such as Germany, Austria, Poland, the United Kingdom, and Sweden. This minuscule fungi is a detrimental contaminant in black truffle orchards, where Sphaerosporella brunnea seems to compete and inhibit the infection and growth of Tuber fungi, causing economic loss due to decreased infection rates of Tuber species.

== Taxonomy and phylogeny ==
Sphaerosporella brunnea was first identified by Johann Baptist von Albertini and Lewis David von Schweinitz in their Conspectus fungorum in Lusatiae Superioris agro Niskiensi crescentium, e methodo Persooniana (1805), a publication that described fungi in Germany and Lusatia. Albertini & Schwinitz classified this fungi as Peziza brunnea, and S. brunnea's current name was given by Czech mycologists Mirko Svrček and Jiří Kubička in 1961.

This species has had many genus and species changes. Sphaerosporella hinnulea and Trichophaea brunnea are two of the more significant synonyms of S. brunnea.

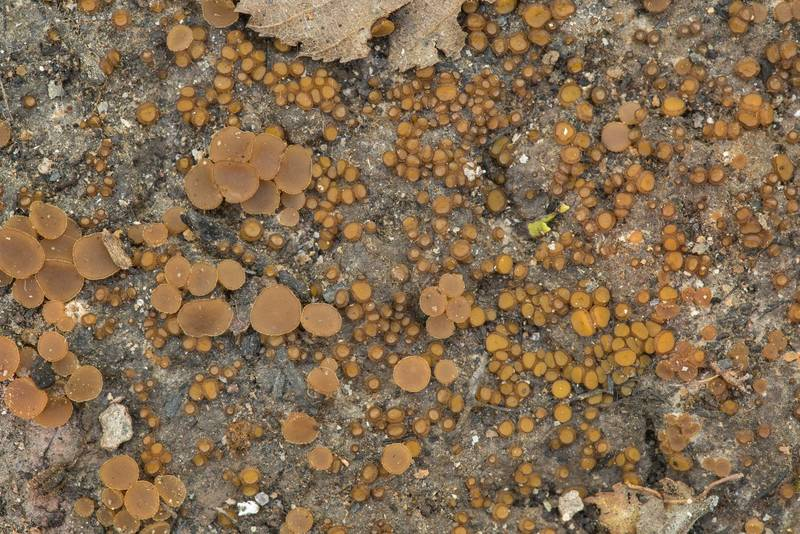
S. brunnea on a bonfire site

Sphaerosporella brunnea and Sphaerosporella hinnulea were thought to be separate species based on small differences in morphology and different habitats. S. brunnea was designated as having fruiting bodies 1-6mm in diameter, being "pale- to dark-brown", and growing in groups on burnt substrates, while S. hinnulea was thought to reach diameters of 1cm, be "reddish-brown" and grow on sandy soils in forests. However this distinction on the colors of these supposed two species was not agreed upon. In 1969 Rifai reported that S. hinnulea had more "reddish coloration of the discs"^{[} while Seaver (1928) described both S. hinnulea and S. brunnea as "reddish-brown". Furthermore, upon finding burnt charcoal in the substrate of the type specimen of S. hinnuella, there can not be said that there are clear differences between neither the habitat nor morphology of S. hinnuella and S. brunnea, and it was determined that these two taxa were synonymous..

== Morphology ==
S. brunnea fruiting bodies appear as round cups ascocarps when young and appear more saucer shaped as they mature, and have a 1-6mm diameter. These fruiting bodies lack stalks and are connected to their substrate at a central location. Fruiting bodies have darker septate hairs around their margin and underside, while the top surface of the fungi is hairless. It seems that S. brunnea can range in color from being brown to yellow-brown to orange-brown, which caused confusion in whether the lighter colors of S. brunnea were a separate species. The flesh of S. brunnea is an orange color. According to Yao & Spooner (1996) the hyphae of S. brunnea appears " thin, with cells often inflated or irregularly lobed".

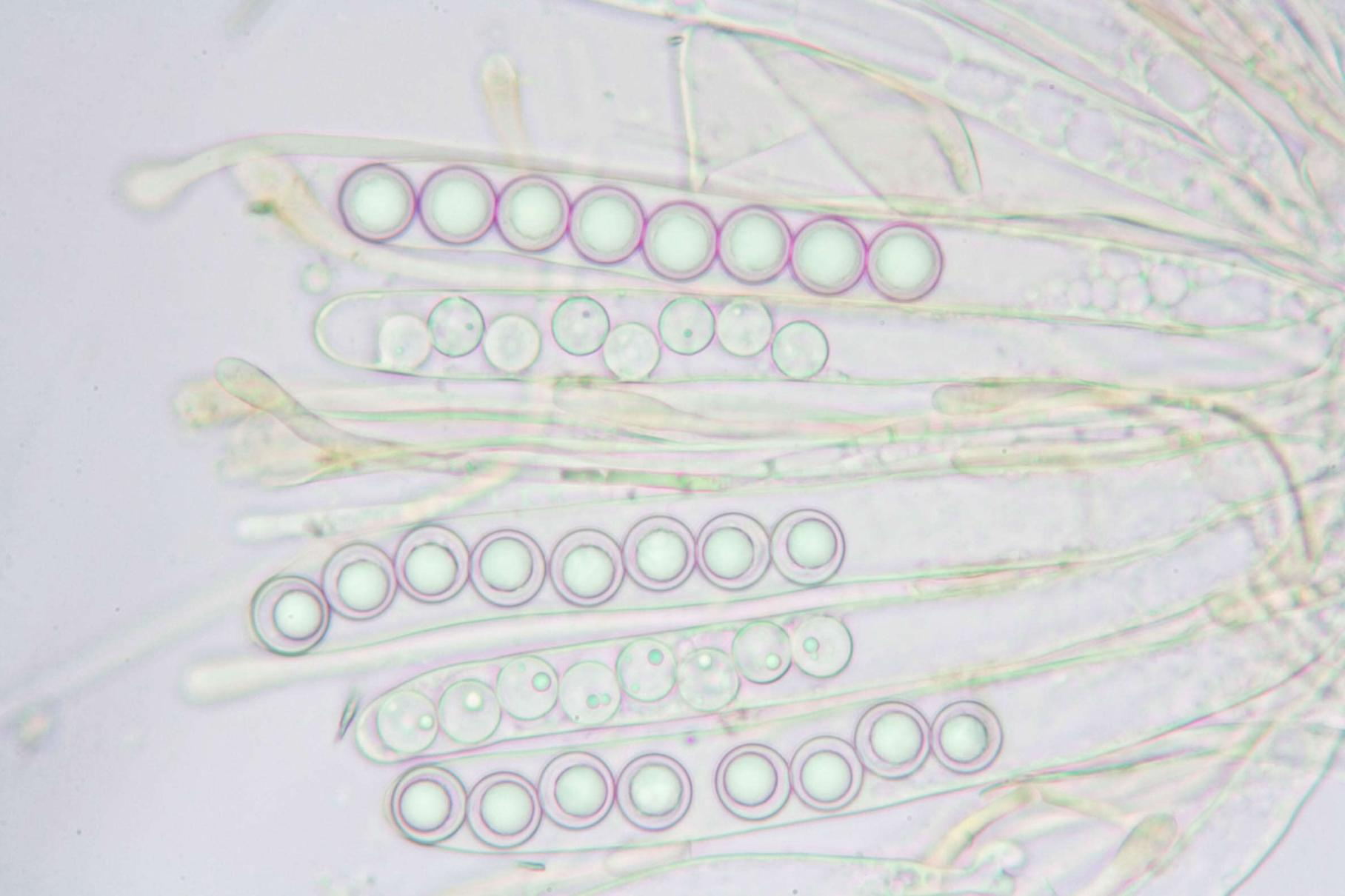
Asci and spores of S. brunnea, large lipid droplet present in spore

The asci of S. brunnea are cylindrical, thin walled and contain 8 ascospores arranged in a single file row. The ascospores themselves are unicellular, colorless, spherical and appear perfectly circular and, according to Wu et al. (1994), young spores contain "small-lipid droplets and large vacuoles", while mature spores contain a "very large lipid droplet, almost filling the spore". S. brunnea is not thought to be toxic, and the flesh has been described as having "no distinctive odor or taste".

== Ecology ==
Sphaerosporella brunnea makes its habitat on burnt substrates, soil containing charcoal or other burnt matter, however it has also been found in sandy soils and among mosses and peat. S. brunnea has been found in Australia, North America, Asia, and Europe. Yao & Spooner (1996) report that S. brunnea is found on "new or old burnt ground and charcoal heaps, sometimes amongst mosses". The occurrence of pyrophilous fungi on burnt substrates is not totally understood, but could be due to "changes in soil pH, increased carbon content, heat activation of spores, lack of competition from other less heat-tolerant fungi, or fruiting in response to loss of a nutritional host".

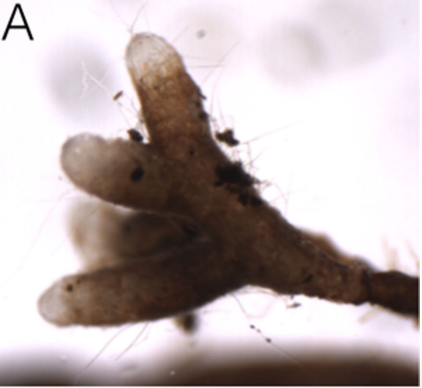
Ectomycorrhizae of S. brunnea

S. brunnea is a fast-growing operculate fungi whose "ascospores germinate readily", and is thus one of the first new pioneering growths in post-fire soils. S. brunnea is ectomycorrhizal, has low host specificity, and has been found to form ectomycorrhizal relationships with a wide range of hosts such as Jack pine trees (Pinus banksiana), Picea, Larix, Populus, Quercus robur, Quercus ilex and Castanea sativa. In a study done by Danielson (1984), Jack pine roots infected with S. brunnea were examined, and it was found that it had formed mycorrhizae that were "simple or dichotomously branched once or twice" "ochraceous (light brownish yellow) but darkening with age" and composed of "smooth hyphae 4-14 μm in diameter" and with a "well-developed" Hartig net. In addition to this, Ángeles-Argáiz et al. (2015) describes S. brunnea ectomycorrhizae as having "thin and smooth mantles in brown to reddish-brown colorations, sometimes opaque or lacquers, without cystidia or clamp connections", and "without rhizomorphs or mycelial mats. In inoculation tests on Jack pine, it was found that this ability to form mycorrhizal relationships is not shared by related taxa: Anthracobia melaloma, Trichophaea minuta, T. contradicta, and T. abundans. In a study done by Hughes et al. (2020) Sphaerosporella endophytes were found in pine needles, which has not been reported in the past. Hughes et al. found that the infection of roots and needles are separate, and infection in the roots my be due to interactions with Sphaerosporella in the soil, while infection of the roots may be facilitated by "air-borne propagules entering through stomates". In the same study, Sphaerosporella ascocarps were more often observed in severely burned sites which suggests dormant Sphaerosporella ascospores were trigged to germinate by heat.

S. brunnea was capable of degrading pure cellulose and "was a strong producer of phenol oxidases", which indicates that S. brunnea could be saprobic. It is not certain whether a mycorrhizal fungi can also be capable of saprobic growth, but Danielson (1984) believes that S. brunnea is the ideal fungi to test this theory. Moreover, according to Bennuchi et al. (2019), compared to relative taxa, proteins in the genome of S. brunnea show an "enriched capacity to produce plant cell wall -degrading enzymes" which could support S. brunnea having possible saprobic ability

== Overall biology and relevance for humans ==
S. brunnea is a known greenhouse contaminant that can interfere with the production of seedling attempting to be infected with species of Tuber, including Tuber melanosporum (black truffle), and has therefore caused significant economic losses in truffle orchards, even making it necessary to destroy entire batches of seedlings. Danielson (1984) proposed that the use of unsterilized peat moss in planting substrate mixtures is the source of S. brunnea contamination, but Ángeles-Argáiz et al. (2015) found that S. brunnea, among other species, can be found in commercial pasteurized peat moss, perhaps due to more heat tolerant spores. Ángeles-Argáiz et al. (2015) report that S. brunnea also seems to be able to be transported to plants from the local environment and not only peat moss, perhaps by air. Once S. brunnea has been established in soils it is difficult to eradicate, but so far there have been no quantitative reports detailing the exact economical damages caused by S. brunnea S. brunnea can prevent Tuber mycorrhizal infection in nurseries producing truffle-infected seedlings across Europe, North America, Oceania, and Asia due to its "massive production of spores that germinate rapidly and quickly infect host plants", but there are currently no long-term solutions to prevent infections of S. brunnea in truffle nurseries.
