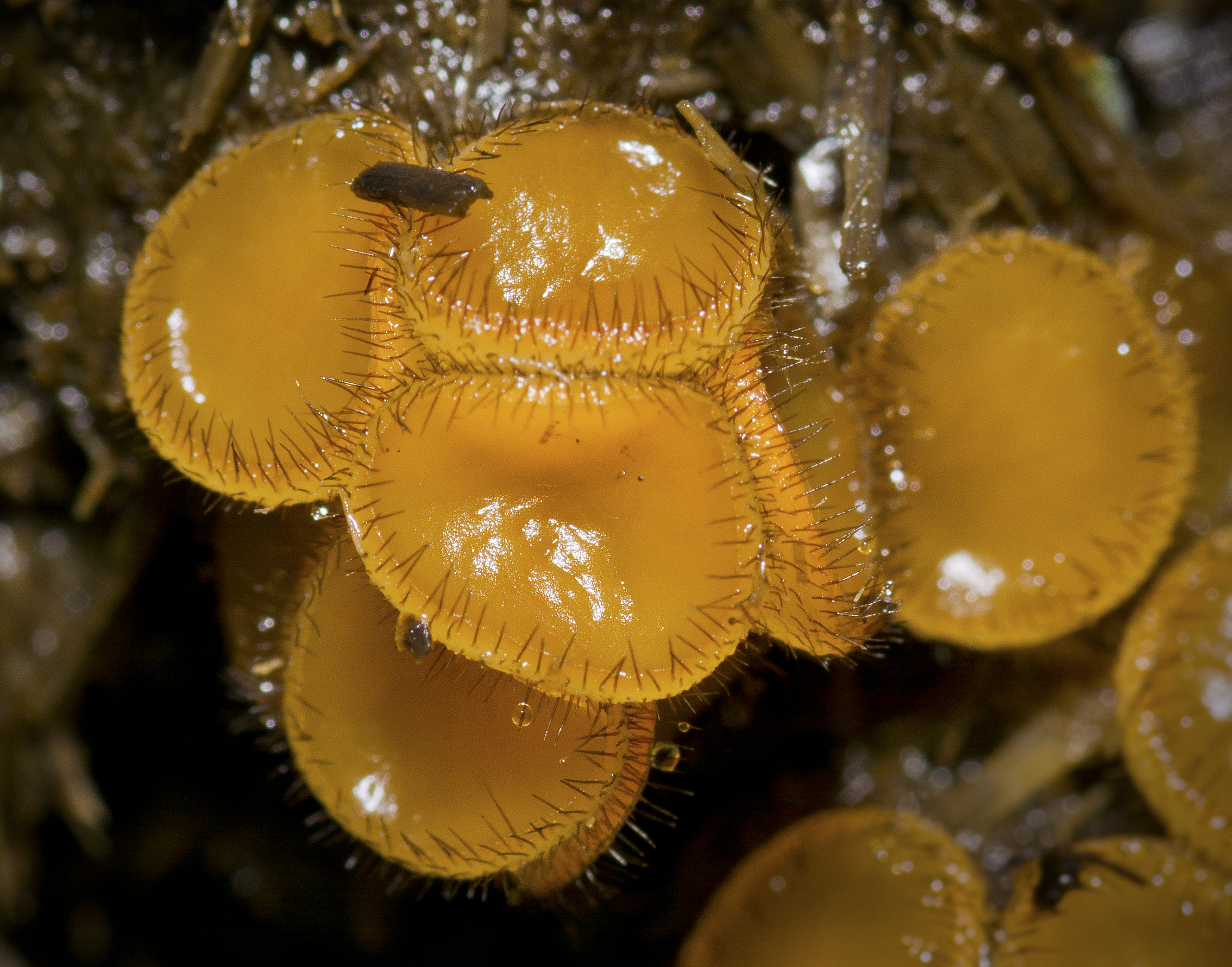

Scientific classification
- Domain: Eukaryota
- Kingdom: Fungi
- Division: Ascomycota
- Class: Pezizomycetes
- Order: Pezizales
- Family: Pyronemataceae
- Genus: Cheilymenia
- Species: C. fimicola

Binomial name
- Cheilymenia fimicola Bagl., 1866

Synonyms
- Cheilymenia coprinaria

= Cheilymenia fimicola =

Species of fungus

Cheilymenia fimicola is a species of apothecial fungus belonging to the family Pyronemataceae.

== Description ==
The fungus grows as orange flat saucers without stipes. It has hairs resembling eyelashes. It is reddish-orange when young and lightens in age.

=== Similar species ===
It may be closely related to species of Aleuria.

Similar species include Cheilymenia crucipila, Cheilymenia stercorea, and Cheilymenia theleboloides.

== Distribution and habitat ==
Occurring in Europe, specimens appear singly or clustered on dung, including that of cattle.

== Edibility ==
It is thought to probably be edible if cleaned thoroughly.
