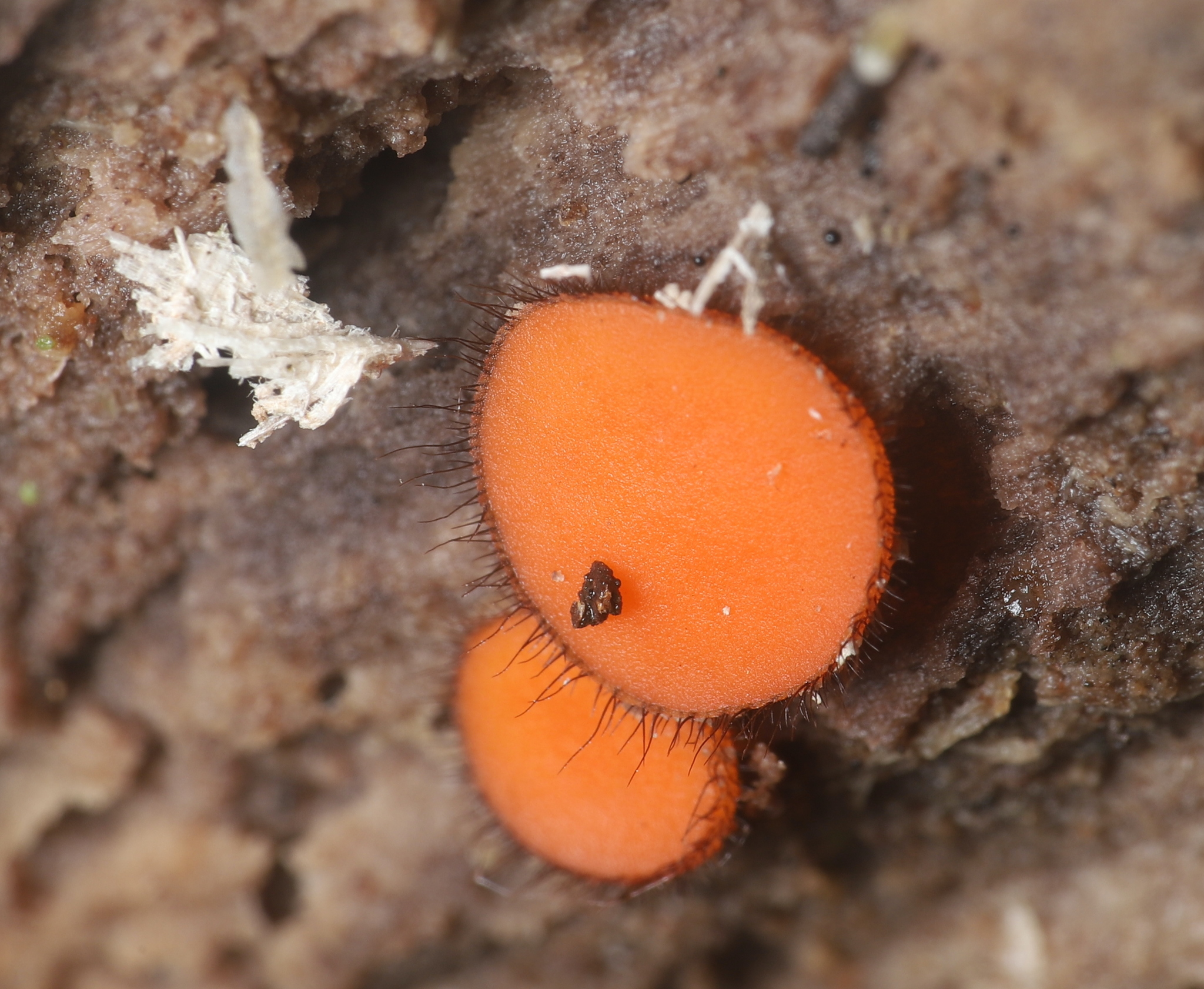

Scientific classification
- Domain: Eukaryota
- Kingdom: Fungi
- Division: Ascomycota
- Class: Pezizomycetes
- Order: Pezizales
- Family: Pyronemataceae
- Genus: Scutellinia
- Species: S. olivascens

Binomial name
- Scutellinia olivascens (Cooke) Kuntze (1891)

Synonyms
- List: Peziza olivascens Cooke (1876); Ciliaria ampullacea (Limm.) Boud. (1907); Humaria olivascens (Cooke) Quél. (1886); Lachnea ampullacea (Limm.) Gillet (1880); Lachnea olivascens (Cooke) Sacc. (1889); Peziza ampullacea Limm. (1878); Peziza macrochaeta Rabenh. & Gonn. (1870); Scutellinia ampullacea (Limm.) Kuntze (1891); Scutellinia ampullacea var. parvula Le Gal (1966); Tricharia olivascens (Cooke) Boud. (1907)

= Scutellinia olivascens =

Species of fungus

Scutellinia olivascens is a species of apothecial fungus belonging to the family Pyronemataceae. The species was described in 1876 by Mordecai Cooke as Peziza olivascens, but Otto Kuntze revised the genus to Scutellinia in 1891.

The species resembles the abundant Scutellinia umbrorum and can only be reliably identified by microscopic features. Found in Europe, S. olivascens forms clusters of orange discs up to 1.5 cm in diameter on soil or rotting wood in summer and autumn.
