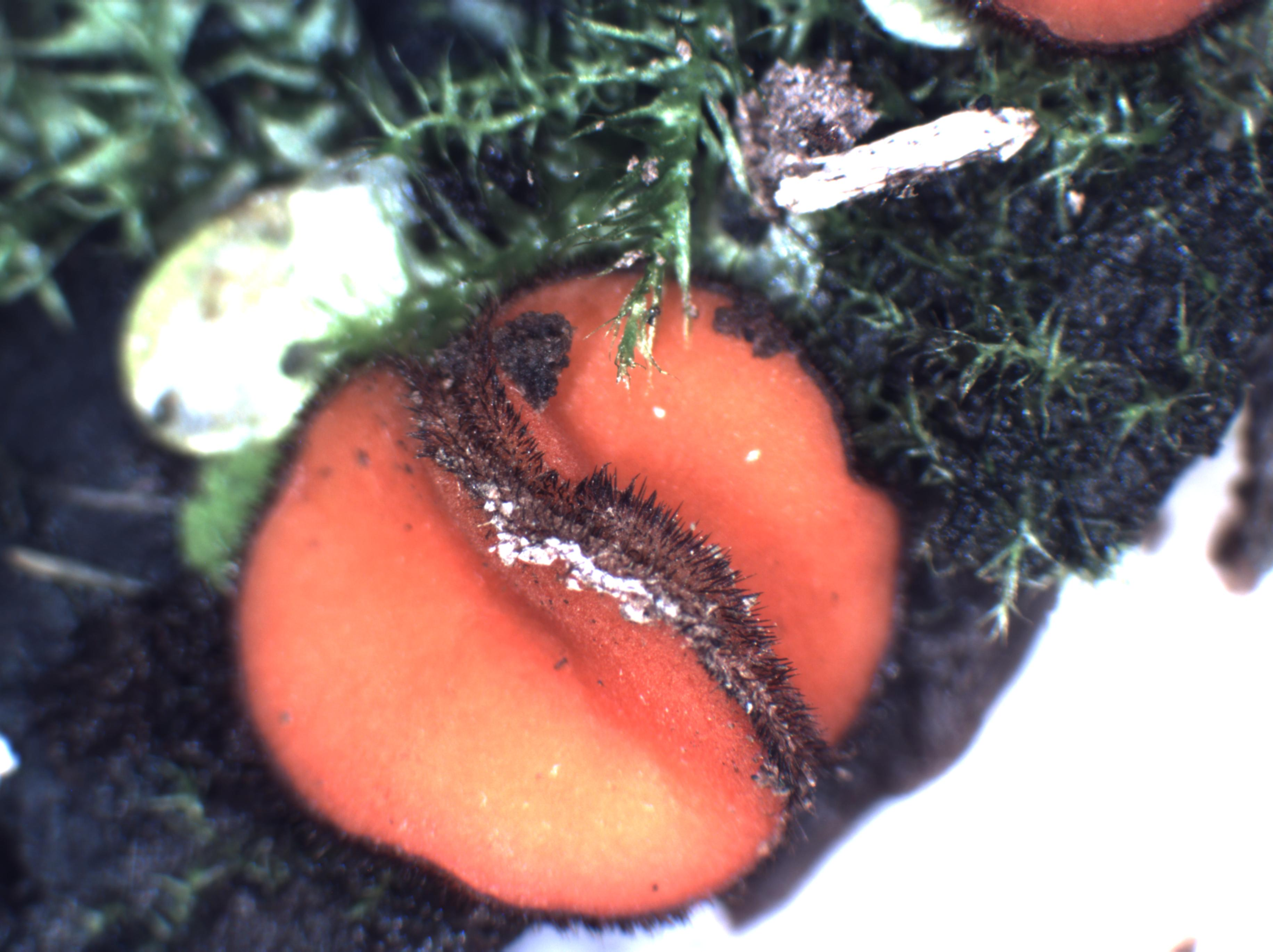

Scientific classification
- Kingdom: Fungi
- Division: Ascomycota
- Class: Pezizomycetes
- Order: Pezizales
- Family: Pyronemataceae
- Genus: Scutellinia
- Species: S. subhirtella

Binomial name
- Scutellinia subhirtella Svrček (1971)

= Scutellinia subhirtella =

Species of fungus

Scutellinia subhirtella is a species of fungus belonging to the family Pyronemataceae. It was described as new to science in 1971 by the Czech mycologist Mirko Svrček from specimens collected in the former Czechoslovakia. The yellowish-red to red fruitbodies grow in damp locations or wetlands on bare soil or mossy ground, as well as on rotting wood.

== Description ==
Scutellinia subhirtella is a small disc-shaped fungus produces fruiting bodies (apothecia) measuring 2–5 mm in diameter. These fruiting bodies are typically scattered rather than clustered, with a disc-like shape that spreads widely as it matures. The inner surface where spores are produced (hymenium) is brownish-red to reddish in colour, while the outer surface is covered with distinctive brown hairs, giving it a bristly appearance.

Under microscopic examination, the fungus features a cellular structure (excipulum) composed of roughly spherical (globose) to slightly elongated, transparent cells measuring 30–40 micrometres (μm) in diameter. The characteristic hairs (setae) along the margin and exterior are 150–600 μm long and 15–30 μm thick, with root-like branching at the base and gradually tapering to a point. These yellowish-brown hairs have relatively thick walls (4–6 μm).

The reproductive structures (asci) are cylindrical, measuring 250–280 by 17–21 μm, and produce eight spores each. The sterile filaments (paraphyses) among the asci are thread-like, 3–4 μm thick but expanding at the tips to 7–10 μm, containing orange pigment.

The spores themselves are transparent (hyaline), containing small oil droplets (guttules), and measure 18–22 by 12–15) μm. They are oblong to broadly elliptical with mostly rounded ends, though some may be narrower. The spore surface is densely covered with small wart-like projections (verrucae) measuring 0.3–1.2 μm high and up to 1.5 μm in diameter. These warts are typically smaller, dot-like, rounded, and irregularly angular to somewhat wavy, but remain distinct when viewed under a microscope.

== Habitat and distribution ==
Scutellinia subhirtella grows on bare soil or mossy ground, as well as on rotting wood, particularly in damp locations or wetlands. The type specimen was collected in Bohemia (now part of the Czech Republic) in the Šumava Mountains near Horská Kvilda on clay soil with detritus in a forest ditch along a road on 30 September 1961.
