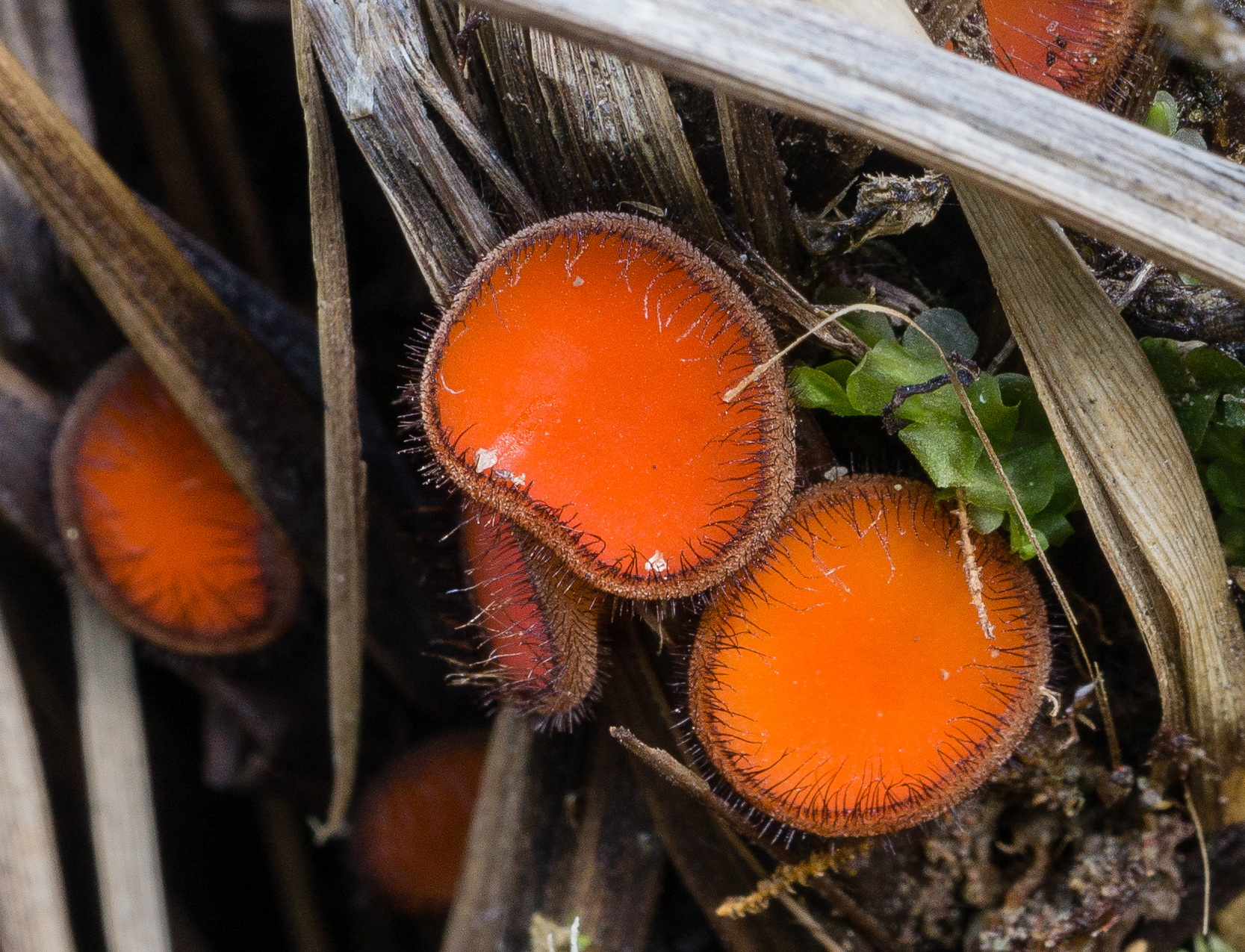

Scientific classification
- Domain: Eukaryota
- Kingdom: Fungi
- Division: Ascomycota
- Class: Pezizomycetes
- Order: Pezizales
- Family: Pyronemataceae
- Genus: Scutellinia
- Species: S. umbrorum

Binomial name
- Scutellinia umbrorum (Fr.) Lambotte (1888)

Synonyms
- Peziza umbrosa Fr. (1822)

= Scutellinia umbrorum =

Species of fungus

Scutellinia umbrorum is a species of apothecial fungus belonging to the family Pyronemataceae. This is a common European species, forming clusters of orange discs up to 1.5 cm in diameter on soil or rotting wood in summer and autumn. It is very similar to congeners such as Scutellinia olivascens and can only be reliably identified by microscopic features. S. umbrorum is inedible.
