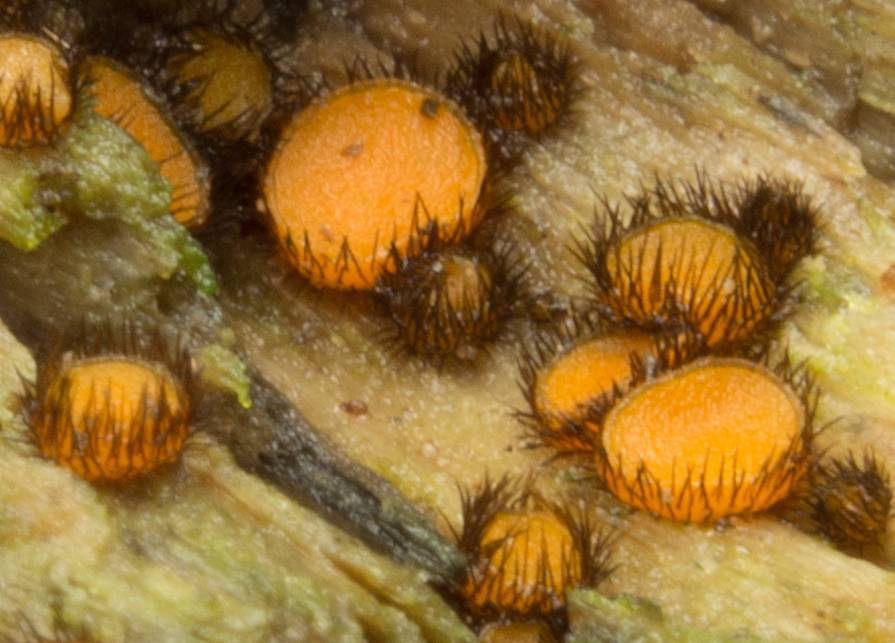

Scientific classification
- Domain: Eukaryota
- Kingdom: Fungi
- Division: Ascomycota
- Class: Pezizomycetes
- Order: Pezizales
- Family: Pyronemataceae
- Genus: Scutellinia
- Species: S. setosa

Binomial name
- Scutellinia setosa (Nees) Kuntze (1891)

Synonyms
- Peziza setosa Nees (1816); Humaria setosa (Nees) Fuckel (1870); Lachnea setosa (Nees) Cooke (1876); Ciliaria setosa (Nees) Boud. (1907); Patella setosa (Nees) Seaver (1929)

= Scutellinia setosa =

Species of fungus

Scutellinia setosa is a species of apothecial fungus belonging to the family Pyronemataceae. Its fruit bodies are disc-shaped with thick black "hairs" (setae) around the cup rim. The smooth, ellipsoid, spores measure 11–13 by 20–22 μm and contain numerous oil droplets. The asci (spore-bearing cells) are roughly cylindrical, measuring 300–325 μm by 12–15 μm. Originally described from Europe, it is also found in North America and Central America, where it grows on the rotting wood of deciduous trees.
