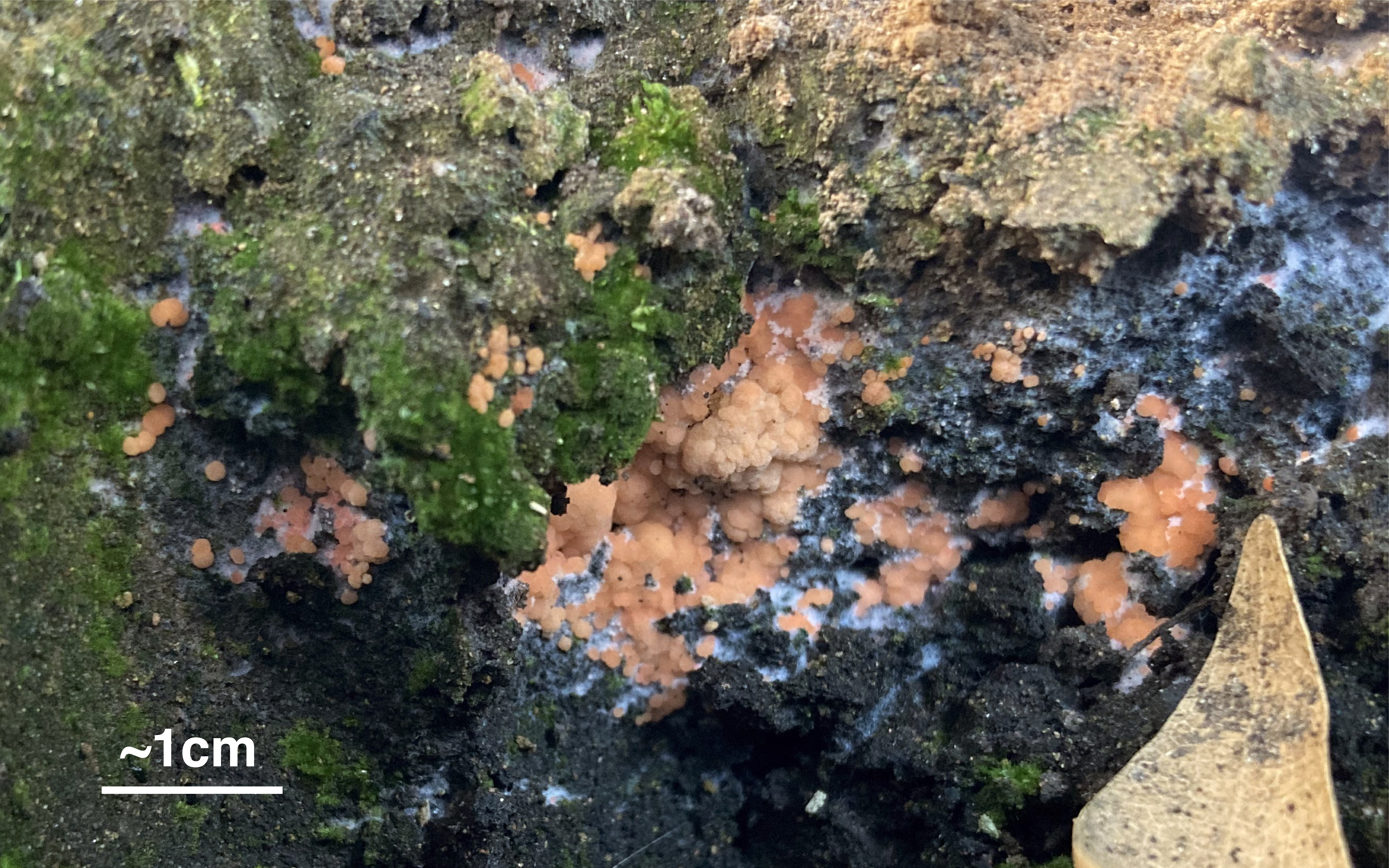
- Pyronema sp. fruiting on burned soil a few months after a wildfire in California, USA

Scientific classification
- Kingdom: Fungi
- Division: Ascomycota
- Class: Pezizomycetes
- Order: Pezizales
- Family: Pyronemataceae
- Genus: Pyronema

Type species
- Pyronema omphalodes (Bull.) Fuckel (1870)

Species
- P. domesticum (Sowerby) Sacc. (1889); P. omphalodes (Bull.) Fuckel (1870)

Synonyms
- Phycoascus A.Møller (1901)

= Pyronema =

Genus of fungi

Pyronema is a genus of cup fungi in the family Pyronemataceae. Pyronema are found fruiting exclusively on recently burned or heat-sterilized substrates. The fruiting bodies (apothecia) are light-pink to orange and disc or cushion shaped. Always growing in dense clusters, and often fusing together resulting in an amorphous mat-like appearance. Ascospores are simple, smooth, ellipsoid, colorless, and lack lipid droplets. When grown in a laboratory setting on agar plates, P. domesticum produces sclerotia, whereas P. omphalodes does not. P. domesticum tends to produce pink to orange apothecia and slightly larger spores, whereas P. omphalodes apothecia are orange to yellow-orange with slightly smaller spores. Pyronema are known to dominate the soil fungal community after fire, and P. domesticum has been shown to metabolize charcoal. P. omphalodes is synonymous with P. confluens and P. marianum.

Pyronema was first circumscribed as Peziza omphalodes by Pierre Bulliard in 1790, and in 1870 Leopold Fuckel built off the description from Bulliard, merging several synonymous species into P. omphalodes. In 1889, Pier Andrea Saccardo circumscribed the species P. domesticum, directly building from the work of James Sowerby.
