= Sphaerosporella =

Scientific classification
- Domain: Eukaryota
- Kingdom: Fungi
- Division: Ascomycota
- Class: Pezizomycetes
- Order: Pezizales
- Family: Pyronemataceae
- Genus: Sphaerosporella (Svrček) Svrček & Kubička (1961)

Type species
- Sphaerosporella brunnea (Alb. & Schwein.) Svrček & Kubička (1961)

Species
- S. brunnea S. hinnulea S. taiwania

Synonyms
- Sphaerospora subgen. Sphaerosporella Svrček (1948)

Genus of fungi

Sphaerosporella is a genus of fungi in the family Pyronemataceae.
