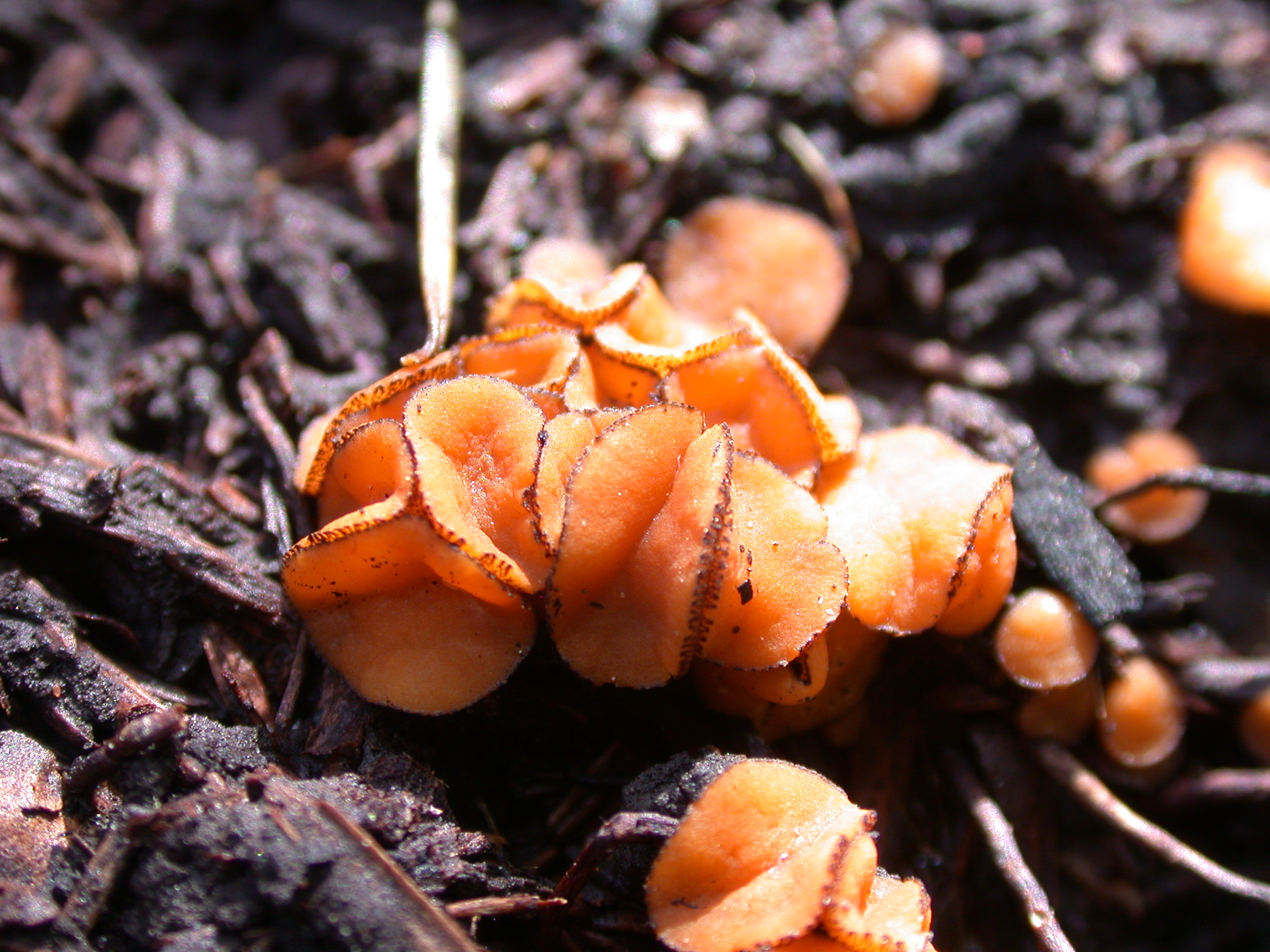
- Anthracobia macrocystis

Scientific classification
- Domain: Eukaryota
- Kingdom: Fungi
- Division: Ascomycota
- Class: Pezizomycetes
- Order: Pezizales
- Family: Pyronemataceae
- Genus: Anthracobia; Boud. (1885)

Type species
- Anthracobia melaloma (Alb. & Schwein.) Arnould (1893)

Species
- A. humana A. korfii A. macrocystis A. maurilabra A. melaloma A. muelleri A. nitida A. rehmii A. subatra A. uncinata

= Anthracobia =

Genus of fungi

Anthracobia is a genus of fungi in the family Pyronemataceae. The genus was circumscribed by Jean Louis Émile Boudier in 1885. Anthracobia is widely distributed in north temperate regions, and contains 15 species. Phylogenetic analyses suggest that the genus as currently circumscribed is polyphyletic.
