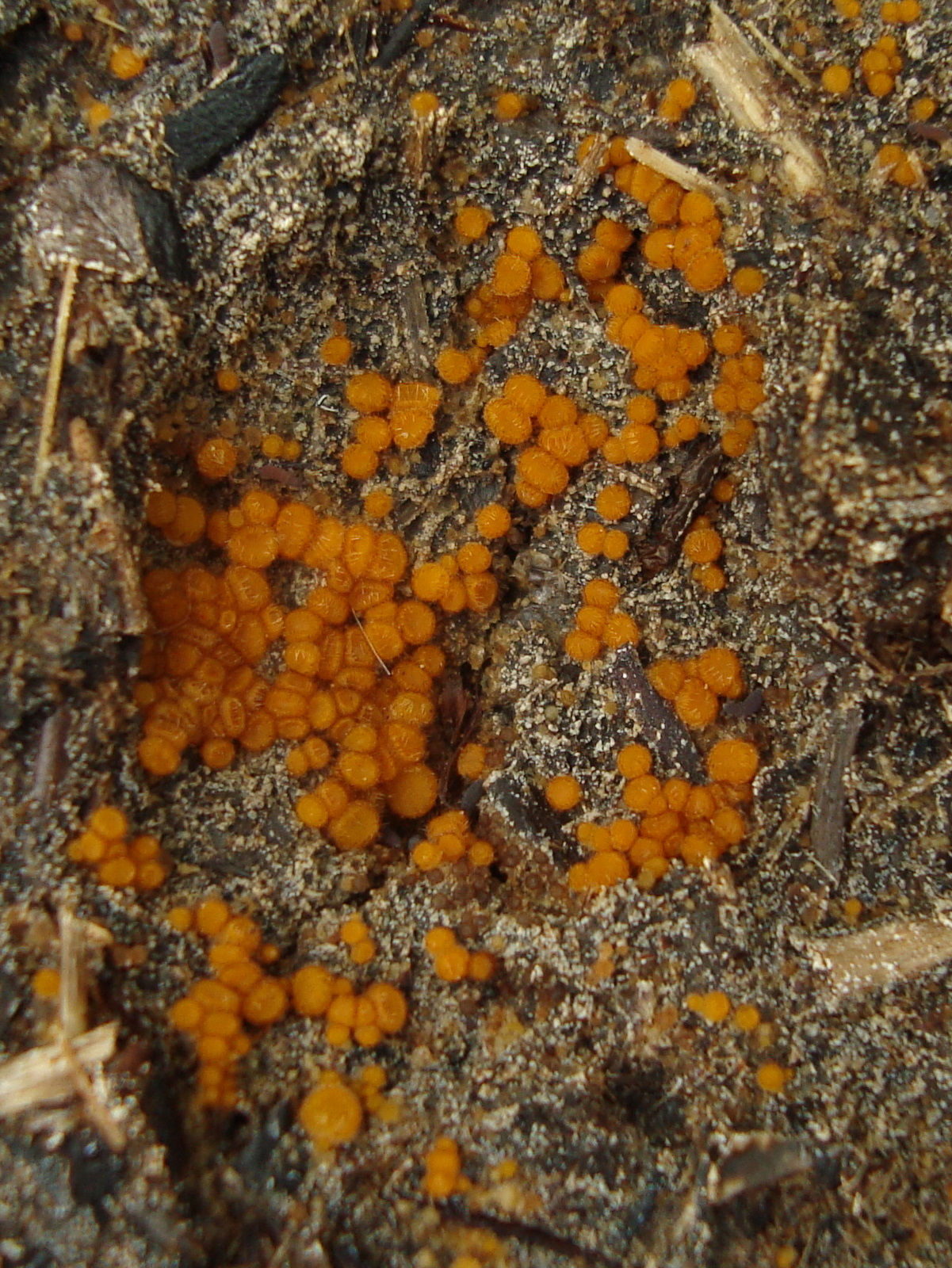
- Cheilymenia spp.

Scientific classification
- Domain: Eukaryota
- Kingdom: Fungi
- Division: Ascomycota
- Class: Pezizomycetes
- Order: Pezizales
- Family: Pyronemataceae
- Genus: Cheilymenia; Boud. (1885)

Type species
- Cheilymenia stercorea (Pers.) Boud. (1907)

Species
- See text

= Cheilymenia =

Genus of fungi

Cheilymenia is a genus of fungi in the family Pyronemataceae. The genus has a widespread distribution, especially in temperate regions, and contains 66 species, many very similar in appearance and habitat and only separable by microscopic features.

== Species ==
Species include:

- Cheilymenia fimicola
- Cheilymenia granulata
- Cheilymenia stercorea
