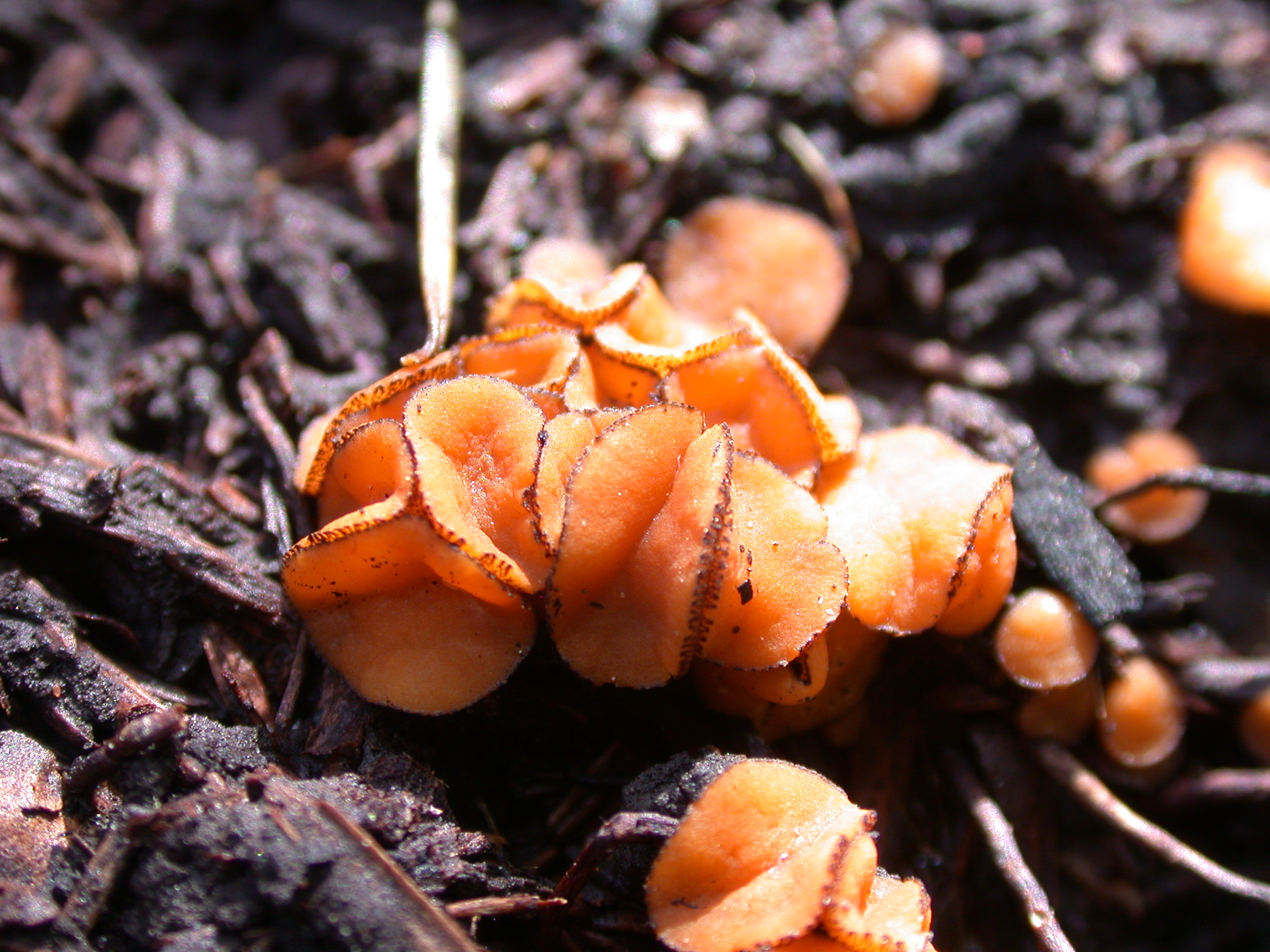

Scientific classification
- Kingdom: Fungi
- Division: Ascomycota
- Class: Pezizomycetes
- Order: Pezizales
- Family: Pyronemataceae
- Genus: Anthracobia
- Species: A. macrocystis

Binomial name
- Anthracobia macrocystis Cooke, 1875

= Anthracobia macrocystis =

Species of fungus

Anthracobia macrocystis, the charcoal goldeneye, is a species of apothecial fungus belonging to the family Pyronemataceae.

This is a European species which appears as orange discs up to 3 mm across thickly clustered on burnt ground.
