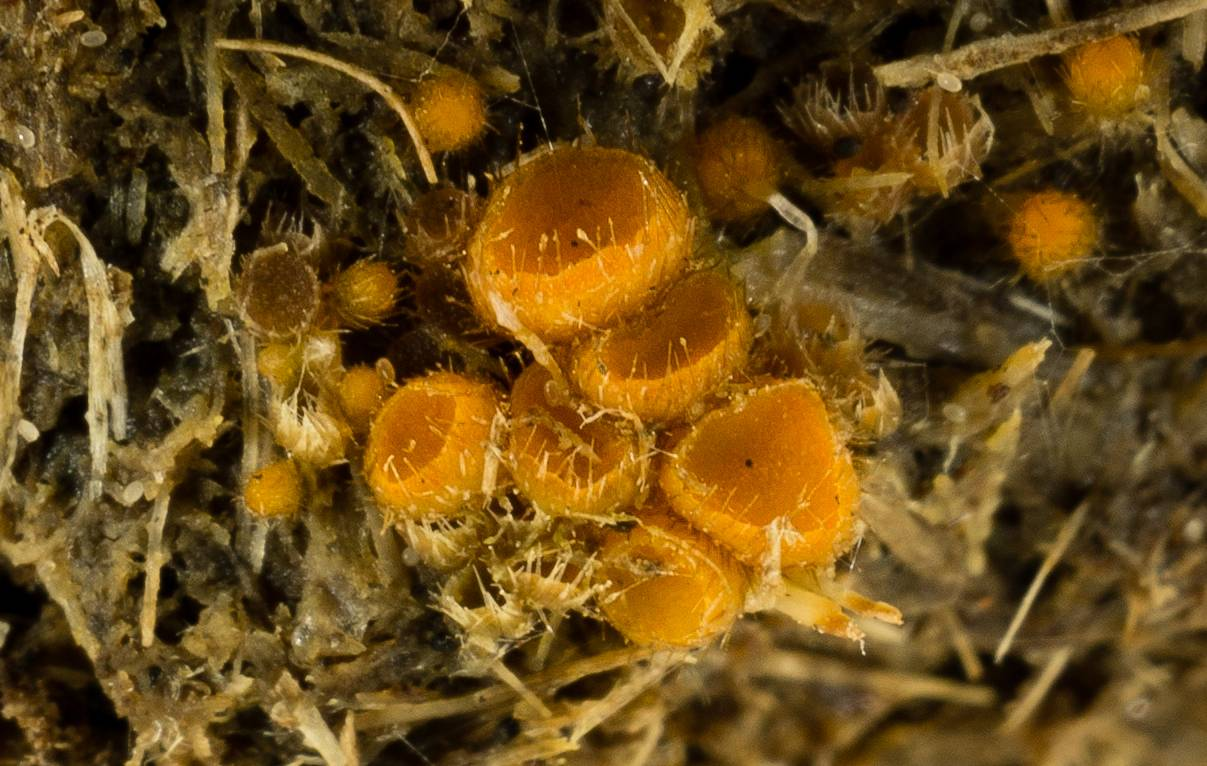

Scientific classification
- Domain: Eukaryota
- Kingdom: Fungi
- Division: Ascomycota
- Class: Pezizomycetes
- Order: Pezizales
- Family: Pyronemataceae
- Genus: Cheilymenia
- Species: C. stercorea

Binomial name
- Cheilymenia stercorea (Pers.) Boud. (1907)

Synonyms
- Peziza stercorea Pers. (1800)

= Cheilymenia stercorea =

Species of fungus

Cheilymenia stercorea is a species of apothecial fungus belonging to the family Pyronemataceae.

Specimens appear as orange-red discs up to 3 mm in diameter, clustered on dung, usually from cows. The spores are elliptical and measure 14–18 by 8–10 μm, while the asci are 175–220 by 9–12 μm.

It is found in Europe and North America.
