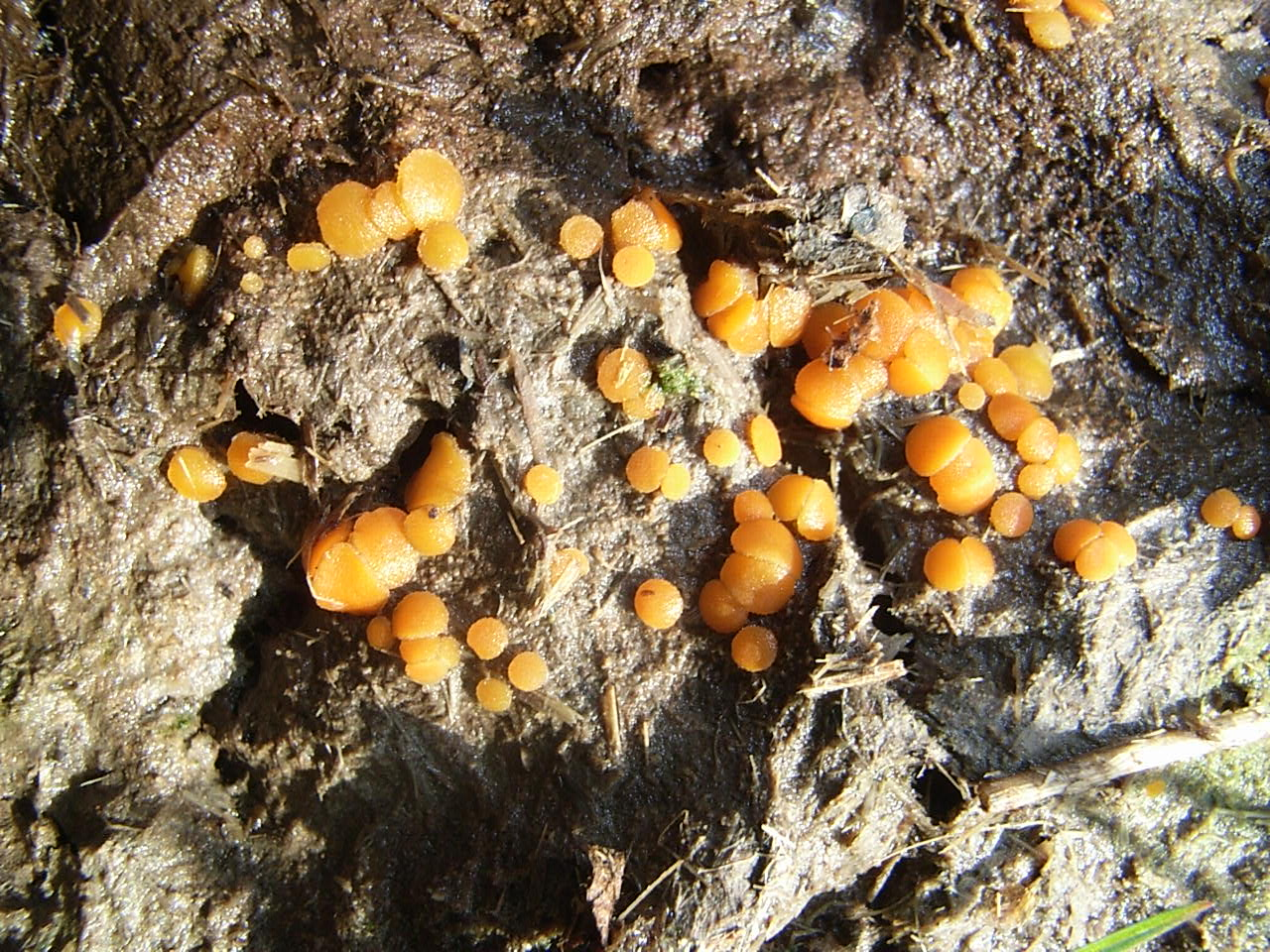

Scientific classification
- Domain: Eukaryota
- Kingdom: Fungi
- Division: Ascomycota
- Class: Pezizomycetes
- Order: Pezizales
- Family: Pyronemataceae
- Genus: Cheilymenia
- Species: C. granulata

Binomial name
- Cheilymenia granulata Bull., 1790

Synonyms
- Coprobia granulata, Ascophanus granulatus

= Cheilymenia granulata =

Species of fungus

Cheilymenia granulata is a species of apothecial fungus belonging to the family Pyronemataceae.

This is a very common European species appearing throughout the year (most commonly in summer and autumn) as tiny orange-red discs up to 2 mm in diameter, thickly clustered on dung, usually from cows.

Many publications place this species in a separate genus, Coprobia.
