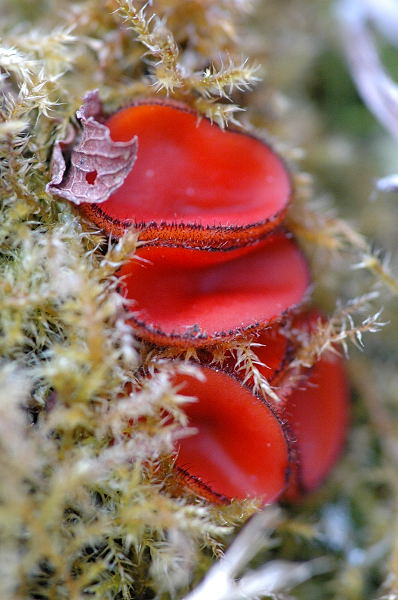
- Scutellinia scutellata

Scientific classification
- Kingdom: Fungi
- Division: Ascomycota
- Class: Pezizomycetes
- Order: Pezizales
- Family: Pyronemataceae
- Genus: Scutellinia (Cooke) Lambotte (1887)

Type species
- Scutellinia scutellata (L.) Lambotte (1887)

= Scutellinia =

Genus of fungi

Scutellinia is a genus of cup-fungi in the family Pyronemataceae. The genus is widely distributed, especially in the Northern Hemisphere, and according to the Dictionary of the Fungi (10th edition, 2008), contains 66 species.

== Species ==
- Scutellinia ahmadiopsis
- Scutellinia armatospora
- Scutellinia badioberbis
- Scutellinia barlae
- Scutellinia cejpii
- Scutellinia citrina
- Scutellinia colensoi
- Scutellinia crinita
- Scutellinia crucipila
- Scutellinia decipiens
- Scutellinia erinaceus
- Scutellinia jejuensis
- Scutellinia kerguelensis
- Scutellinia legaliae
- Scutellinia lusatiae
- Scutellinia macrospora
- Scutellinia marginata
- Scutellinia minor
- Scutellinia minutella
- Scutellinia mirabilis
- Scutellinia nigrohirtula
- Scutellinia olivascens
- Scutellinia paludicola
- Scutellinia patagonica
- Scutellinia pennsylvanica
- Scutellinia pilatii
- Scutellinia pseudotrechispora
- Scutellinia scutellata
- Scutellinia setosa
- Scutellinia sinensis
- Scutellinia subbadioberbis
- Scutellinia subhirtella
- Scutellinia superba
- Scutellinia totaranuiensis
- Scutellinia trechispora
- Scutellinia tuberculata
- Scutellinia umbrorum
- Scutellinia vitreola
