= Pyronema omphalodes =

- Showing orange coloration

Scientific classification
- Kingdom: Fungi
- Division: Ascomycota
- Class: Pezizomycetes
- Order: Pezizales
- Family: Pyronemataceae
- Genus: Pyronema
- Species: P. omphalodes

Binomial name
- Pyronema omphalodes (Bull.) Fuckel

Synonyms
- List: Aleuria omphalodes (Bull.) Gillet; Humaria omphalodes (Bull.) Massee; Peziza omphalodes Bull.; Tapesia omphalodes (Bull.) Quél.; Chromelosporium glomerulosum (Bull.); Chromelosporium glomerulosum Sacc.; Humaria omphalodes anon.; Oedocaphalum glomerulosum Harz; Peziza confluens Pers. DC; Phialea confluens (Pers.) Gillet; Pyronema confluens Pers.; Pyronema omphalodes var. confluens (Pers.) Sacc.; Peziza confluens var. lilacina Pers.; Pyronema omphalodes var. lilacina (Pers.) Sacc.; Peziza confluens var. rosella (Ehrenb.) Pers.; Peziza rosella Ehrenb.; Peziza omphalodes var. aurantiolutea Fr.; Peziza omphalodes var. lutea Wallr.; Pyronema confluens Tul. & C. Tul.; Pyronema confluens var. inigneum W.H. Br.; Pyronema omphalodes var. aurantiolutea Sacc.; Pyronema omphalodes var. camerunense Henn.; Pyronema omphalodes var. claviforme Velen.; Pyronema omphalodes var. incarnatorosea Sacc.

Species of fungi

Pyronema omphalodes is a pyrophilous cup fungus. Known for its fast colonization of burned soil, the fungus thrives in fire altered habitats, where it contributes to soil stabilization and early ecological succession. Its distinctive orange to pink fruiting bodies and extensive white mycelium make it recognizable on burned substrates.

== Taxonomy ==
Pyronema omphalodes was described in France by Pierre Bulliard in the 18th century as Peziza omphalodes and later reclassified by Fuckel under its current name, P. omphalodes. Pyronema confluens was previously believed to be a separate Pyronema species but is now synonymous of P. omphalodes.

== Morphology ==
Pyronema omphalodes produces small, brightly colored pink orange cup shaped apothecia. The fruiting bodies are small, often only a few millimeters in diameter. They often grow in dense clusters appearing as irregular mats. P. omphalodes produces white mycelium surrounding its apothecia. Individual fruiting bodies arise from the mycelial mat.

The apothecia contain asci cylindrical, operculate, asci. Asci are eight-spored. Ascospores are 150 µm in length and 10–15 µm in width. The ascospores are hyaline, and produced through sexual reproduction.

== Reproduction ==
Pyronema omphalodes is homothallic. It undergoes sexual reproduction, forming apothecia containing asci and ascospores. Under laboratory conditions, the life cycle of P. omphalodes is seven days long. When conditions are favorable ascospores germinate and produce mycelium in a few hours. Sexual reproductive structures develop two days after germination, followed by the formation of apothecia by day four. By the seventh day post germination the apothecia mature and produce asci containing haploid ascospores.

== Ecology ==
Pyronema omphalodes on burnt substate

Pyronema omphalodes is an early-successional species that quickly colonizes substrates following wildfires. Wildfires alter soil conditions, nutrient availability and the composition of the microbial environment. These changes create opportunities for fungi, like P. omphalodes to exploit. Experimental burning of forest soils has demonstrated that Pyronema species, which may be rare before fire, can become dominant members of the fungal community within the first few weeks following a disturbance. In one experimental study, sequences assigned to Pyronema accounted for approximately 37% of the fungal sequences detected during the first two weeks following fire.

Pyrophilous fungi contribute to soil stabilization through the formation of hyphal networks in post fire succession. Experimental research has demonstrated that P. omphalodes, along with the pyrophilous fungi Geopyxis carbonaria and Morchella septimelata, significantly increased the aggregation of burned forest soil compared with uninoculated controls. Soil aggregation suggests that P. omphalodes could stabilize soils, reducing erosion and nutrient loss during the early stages of ecosystem recovery.Pyronema omphalodes abundance declines rapidly following initial colonization. The mechanisms driving this decline are not fully understood but may be partially attributed to competition with other microorganisms and the production of antifungal compounds by soil bacteria.

== Fire associated adaptations ==
Studies indicate pyrophilous fungi have genomic adaptations that may help establishment in fire alerted environments . Genomic analyses have identified enzyme families, including lytic polysaccharide monooxygenases, glycoside and hydrolases, in pyrophilous fungi. These are believed to contribute to the degradation of organic matter in burned substrates. Additionally, stress-response gene families, including heat shock proteins, may help these fungi tolerate environmental stress. Combined the genetic characteristics a contribute to the ability of pyrophilous fungi to colonize in fire effected soils.

Little is known about the mechanisms used by P. omphalodes to persist between fire events. Some research suggests that Pyronema species survive as dormant spores or resting structures in soil until stimulated by heat or chemical changes associated with fire. Experimental burning of forest soils has demonstrated rapid increases in Pyronema abundance.

== Distribution ==
Pyronema omphalodes is reported across the across the globe. It has been documented in Europe, North America, and Australia, primarily from recently burned or otherwise intensely heated soils. In North America, records extend across both eastern and western regions of the United States and Canada. European records include the United Kingdom and northern European countries such as Denmark, Finland, Norway, and Sweden, while the species has also been reported following fires in Australian Eucalyptus forests.
