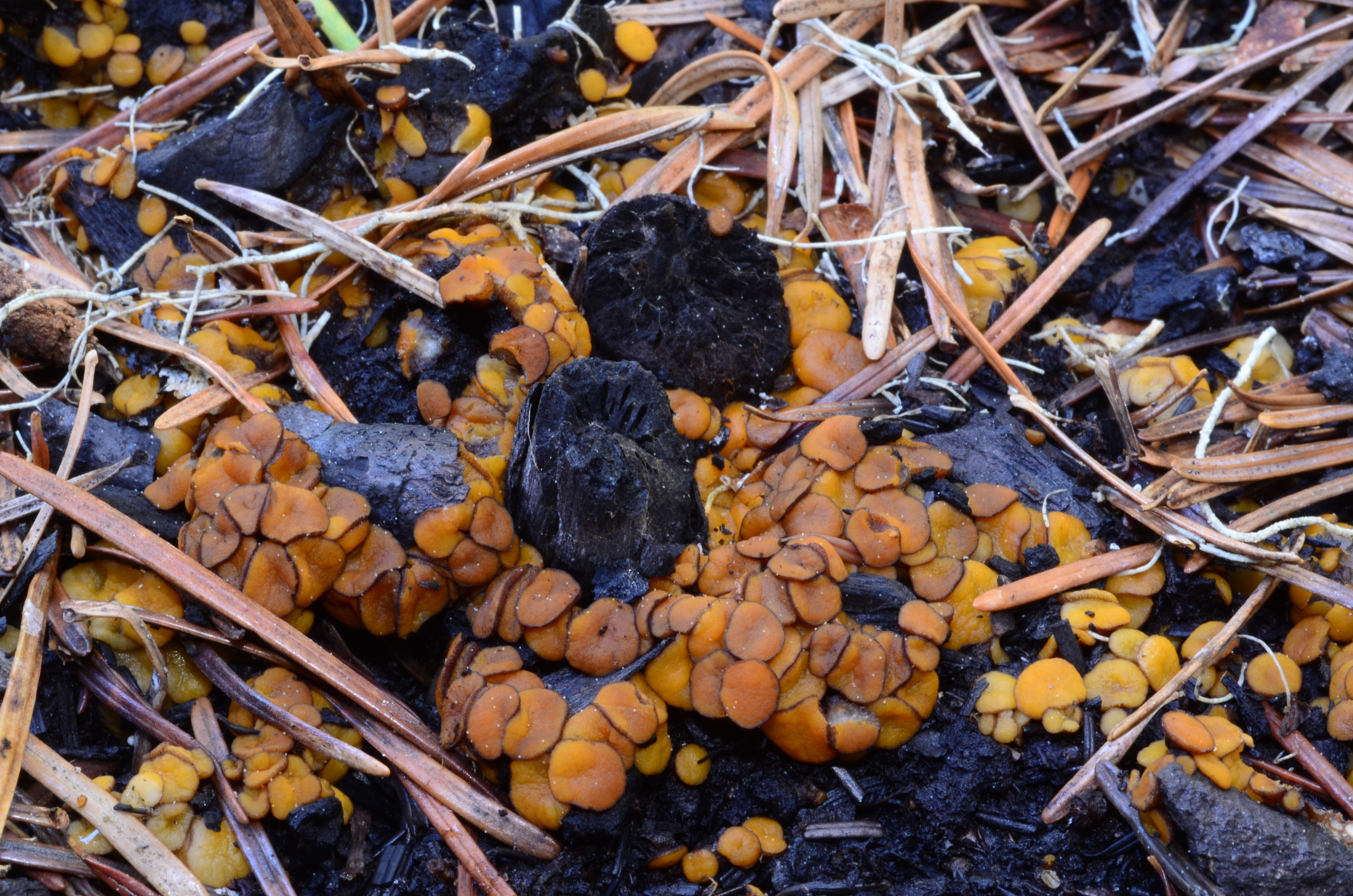

Scientific classification
- Domain: Eukaryota
- Kingdom: Fungi
- Division: Ascomycota
- Class: Pezizomycetes
- Order: Pezizales
- Family: Pyronemataceae
- Genus: Anthracobia
- Species: A. melaloma

Binomial name
- Anthracobia melaloma (Alb. & Schwein.) Boud. (1893)

Synonyms
- Peziza melaloma Alb. & Schwein. (1805); Humaria melaloma (Alb. & Schwein.) P.Karst. (1885); Lachnea melaloma (Alb. & Schwein.) Sacc. (1889); Humariella melaloma (Alb. & Schwein.) J.Schröt. (1893); Patella melaloma (Alb. & Schwein.) Seaver (1928)

= Anthracobia melaloma =

Species of fungus

Anthracobia melaloma is a species of apothecial fungus belonging to the family Pyronemataceae. It produces orangish cup-or disc-like fruit bodies that have small brown hairs around the edge. Fruit bodies occur in burn sites.
