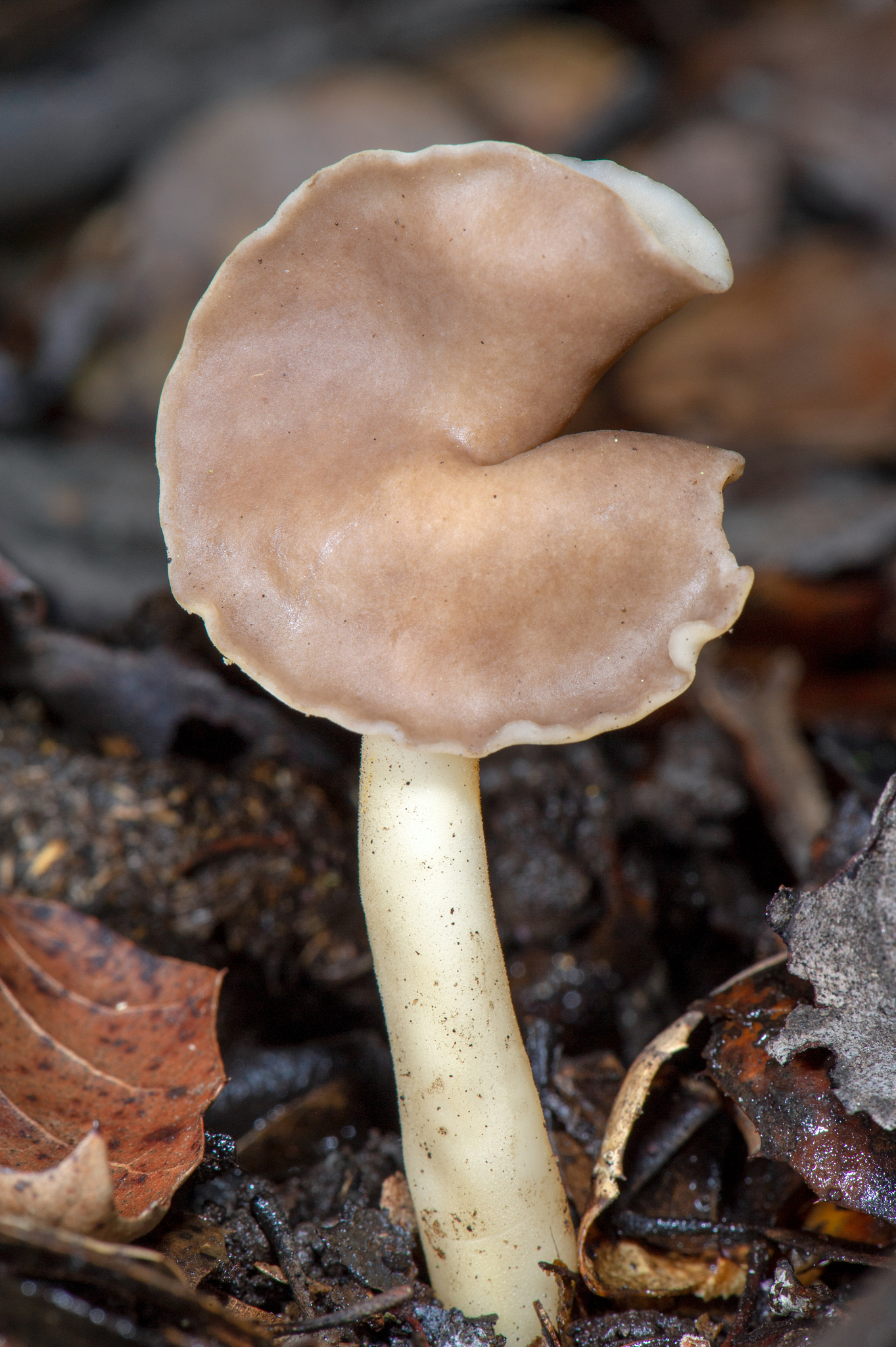
- Baja California, Mexico, 2019
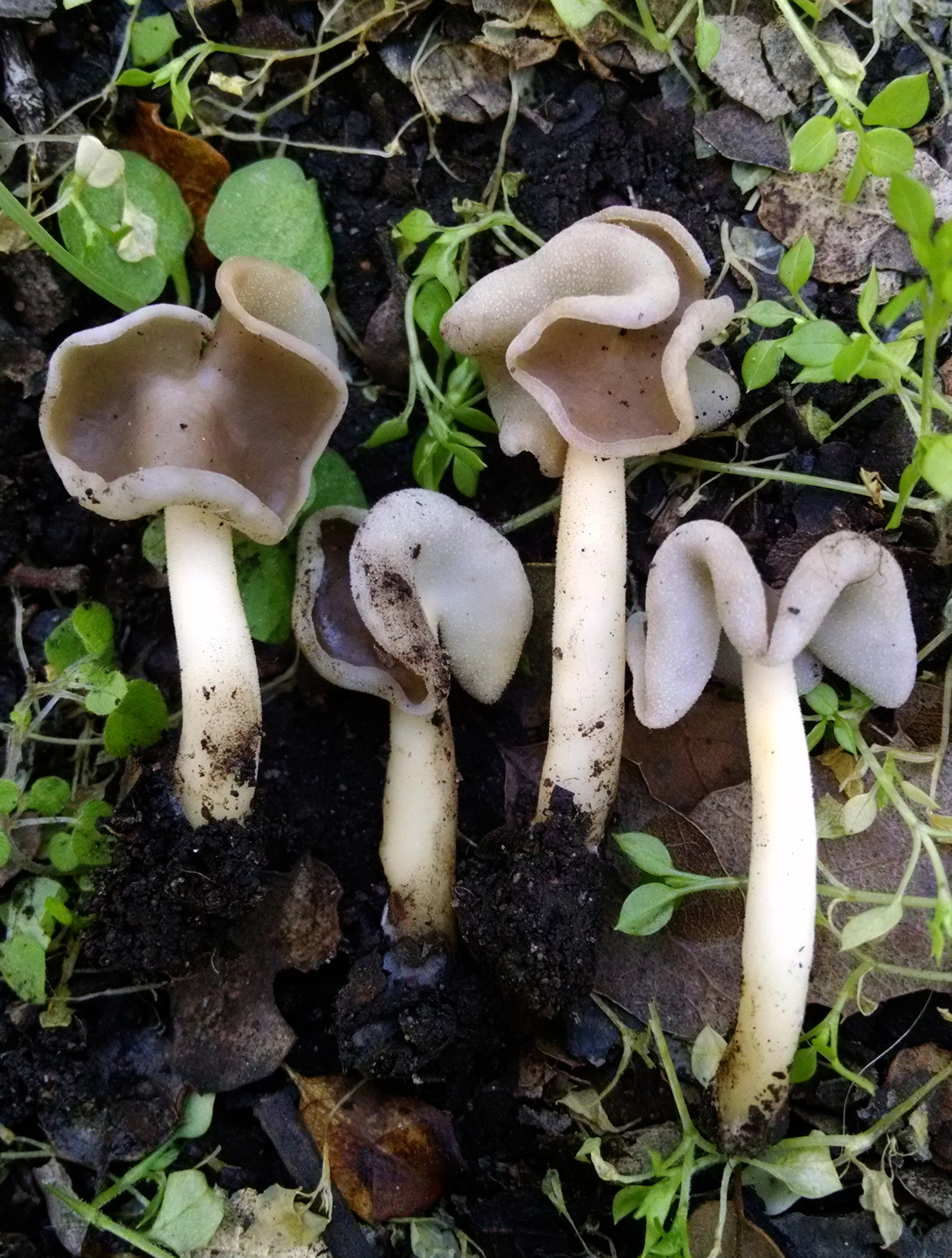
- Los Peñasquitos Canyon Preserve, 2017

Scientific classification
- Kingdom: Fungi
- Division: Ascomycota
- Class: Pezizomycetes
- Order: Pezizales
- Family: Helvellaceae
- Genus: Helvella
- Species: H. compressa

Binomial name
- Helvella compressa (Snyder) N.S.Weber (1975)

Synonyms
- Paxina compressa Synder (1936)

= Helvella compressa =

Species of fungus

Helvella compressa, also known as the compressed elfin saddle, is a species of ascomycete "sac fungus" related to the Peziza cups.

== Description ==
The distinctive fruiting body looks roughly like a fortune cookie on a stick. The brownish cap is up to 5 centimetres (2 in) in diameter. The pale stalk is up to 10 cm long and 1.2 cm thick.

=== Similar species ===
The species can only be confused with Helvella albella, which is rarer, and has a darker brown cap and a smooth underside (rather than H. compressa's "faintly" fuzzy underside) and H. elastica, which is smaller, with "rounder lobes". H. compressa can be distinguished from H. atra by its coloration.

Helvella compressa is genetically closely related to H. stevensii, H. corbierei, and H. levis (synonym of Helvella latispora). H. levis is more common in Europe and the Danish call it Bredsporet foldhat ("wide-brimmed hat"). Helvella stevensii is smaller and paler than H. compressa.

== Distribution ==
Helvella compressa is endemic to North America west of the Rocky Mountains. According to David Arora, H. compressa "seems to be the most common" of the non-fluted Helvellas found in California. Helvella compressa is possibly also present in China and Tibet.

== See also ==
- Helvella ephippium
- Paragyromitra infula
