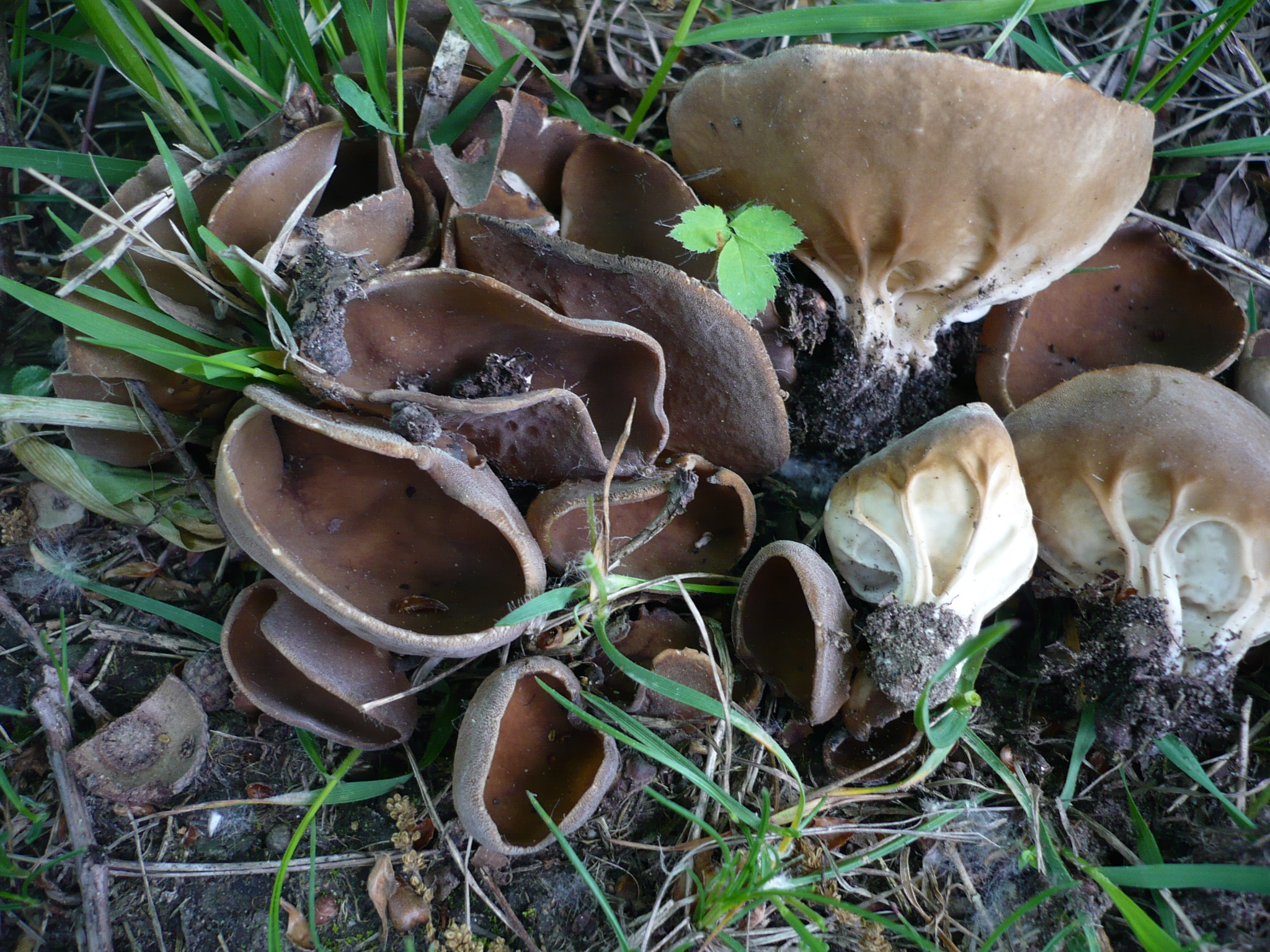

Scientific classification
- Kingdom: Fungi
- Division: Ascomycota
- Class: Pezizomycetes
- Order: Pezizales
- Family: Helvellaceae
- Genus: Helvella
- Species: H. acetabulum

Binomial name
- Helvella acetabulum (L.) Quél. (1874)

Synonyms
- Peziza acetabulum L. (1753); Octospora acetabulum (L.) Timm (1788); Peziza sulcata Pers. (1801); Macroscyphus acetabuliforme Gray (1821); Acetabula sulcata (Pers.) Fuckel (1870); Acetabula vulgaris Fuckel (1870); Paxina acetabulum (L.) Kuntze (1891); Paxina sulcata (Pers.) Kuntze (1891)

= Helvella acetabulum =

Species of fungus

Helvella acetabulum Mycological characteristics
- Smooth hymenium
- Cap is infundibuliform
- Hymenium attachment is not applicable
- Stipe is bare
- Ecology is mycorrhizal
- Edibility is not recommended

Helvella acetabulum is a species of fungus in the family Helvellaceae, order Pezizales. This relatively large cup-shaped fungus is characterized by a tan fruit body with prominent branching ribs resembling a cabbage leaf; for this reason it is commonly known as the cabbage leaf Helvella. Other colloquial names include the vinegar cup and the brown ribbed elfin cup.

The fruit bodies reaches dimensions of 8 centimetres (3 in) by 4 cm (1 1/2 in) tall. It is found in Eurasia and North America, where it grows in sandy soils, under both coniferous and deciduous trees.

== Taxonomy ==
The fungus was first named as Peziza acetabulum by Carl Linnaeus in his 1753 Species Plantarum. It was given its current name by French mycologist Lucien Quélet in 1874 after having been placed in various Peziza segregates: Joachim Christian Timm placed it in Octospora (1788), Samuel Frederick Gray in Macroscyphus (1821), and Leopold Fuckel in Acetabula (1870). The trend continued, with Claude Casimir Gillet with placing it in Aleuria in 1879, and Otto Kuntze in his new Paxina (of which it would later be designated type species) in 1891.

Described independently as Peziza sulcata by Christiaan Hendrik Persoon in 1801, it was placed under that name in both Paxina and Acetabula—alongside its precursor as both taxa were still considered separate at the time. Finally, Frederic Clements renamed Acetabula as Phleboscyphus in 1903 and improperly reused Fuckel's name as the basionym of his Phleboscyphus vulgaris.

=== Etymology ===
The specific epithet acetabulum means "little vinegar cup", and was the Latin word for a small vessel used for storing vinegar (see acetabulum). Common names include the "cabbage leaf Helvella", the "vinegar cup", the "ribbed-stalk cup", and the "brown ribbed elfin cup".

== Description ==
Helvella acetabulum has a deeply cup-shaped fruit body (technically an apothecium) that is up to 8 centimetres (3 inches) in diameter, and 4 cm (1 1/2 in) deep. The cream-colored stem is typically 1 to 6 cm (1/2 to 2 1/2 in) tall by 1 to 3 cm (1/2 to 1 1/4 in) thick, with ribs extending almost to the top of the fruit body. The fruit body's exterior surface is cream-colored towards the stem and may feel subtly grainy near the margin. The inner spore-bearing surface, the hymenium, is brownish and possibly smooth or slightly wavy. The mushroom's odor and taste are not distinctive.

The spores are smooth, elliptical, translucent (hyaline), and contain a single central oil droplet; they have dimensions of 18–20 by 12–14 μm. The spore-bearing cells, the asci, are 350–400 by 15–20 μm, are operculate—meaning they have an apical "lid" that releases the spores. The tips of the asci are inamyloid, so they do not adsorb iodine when stained with Melzer's reagent. The paraphyses are club-shaped, and have a pale brown color, with tips that are up to 10 μm thick.

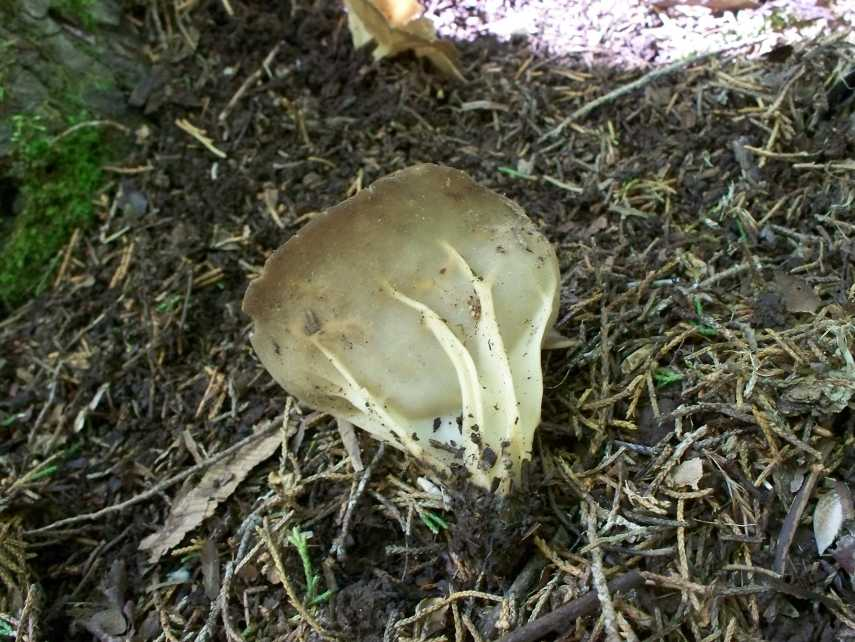
Prominent ribs on the outer surface are characteristic

=== Similar species ===
Helvella queletii has a roughly similar form and appearance, but the ribbing in that species does not extend up the margin as does H. acetabulum. H. griseoalba has ribs that extend halfway up the sides of the fruit body, but the color of the cup is pale to dark gray rather than cream. The ribs of H. solitaria and Dissingia leucomelaena barely touch the cap. H. costifera produces similar fruit bodies but has a grayish to grayish-brown hymenium; like H. acetabulum, it has ribs that extend to most of the outside of the fruit body. There are sometimes intermediate forms between the two species, making them difficult to distinguish.

H. robusta is also similar to H. acetabulum, but has a lighter-colored hymenium, a robust stem, and the margin of the fruit body is often bent over the stem at maturity. In contrast, H. acetabulum never has the edge of the fruit body bent over the stem, and the stem is "indistinct or prominent, but never robust". Other similar species include H. leucomelaena and Gyromitra perlata.

== Distribution and habitat ==
This fungus is widespread in North America and Europe. In North America, the distribution extends north to Alberta, Canada. In Mexico, it has been collected from State of Mexico, Guanajuato, Guerrero, and Tlaxcala. It is also found in Israel, Jordan, Turkey, Iran China (Xinjiang) and Japan.

The fruit bodies grows solitary, scattered, or clustered together on soil in both coniferous and deciduous woods, typically in spring and summer. A preference for growing in association with coast live oak (Quercus agrifolia) has been noted for Californian populations.

== Potential toxicity ==
The edibility of the fruit bodies is often listed as unknown, but consumption of this fungus is not recommended as similar species in the family Helvellaceae contain varying levels of monomethylhydrazine (MMH). Although MMH can be removed by boiling in a well-ventilated area, consumption of any MMH-producing mushroom is not advisable (as with G. esculenta). Roger Phillips lists the species as poisonous.
