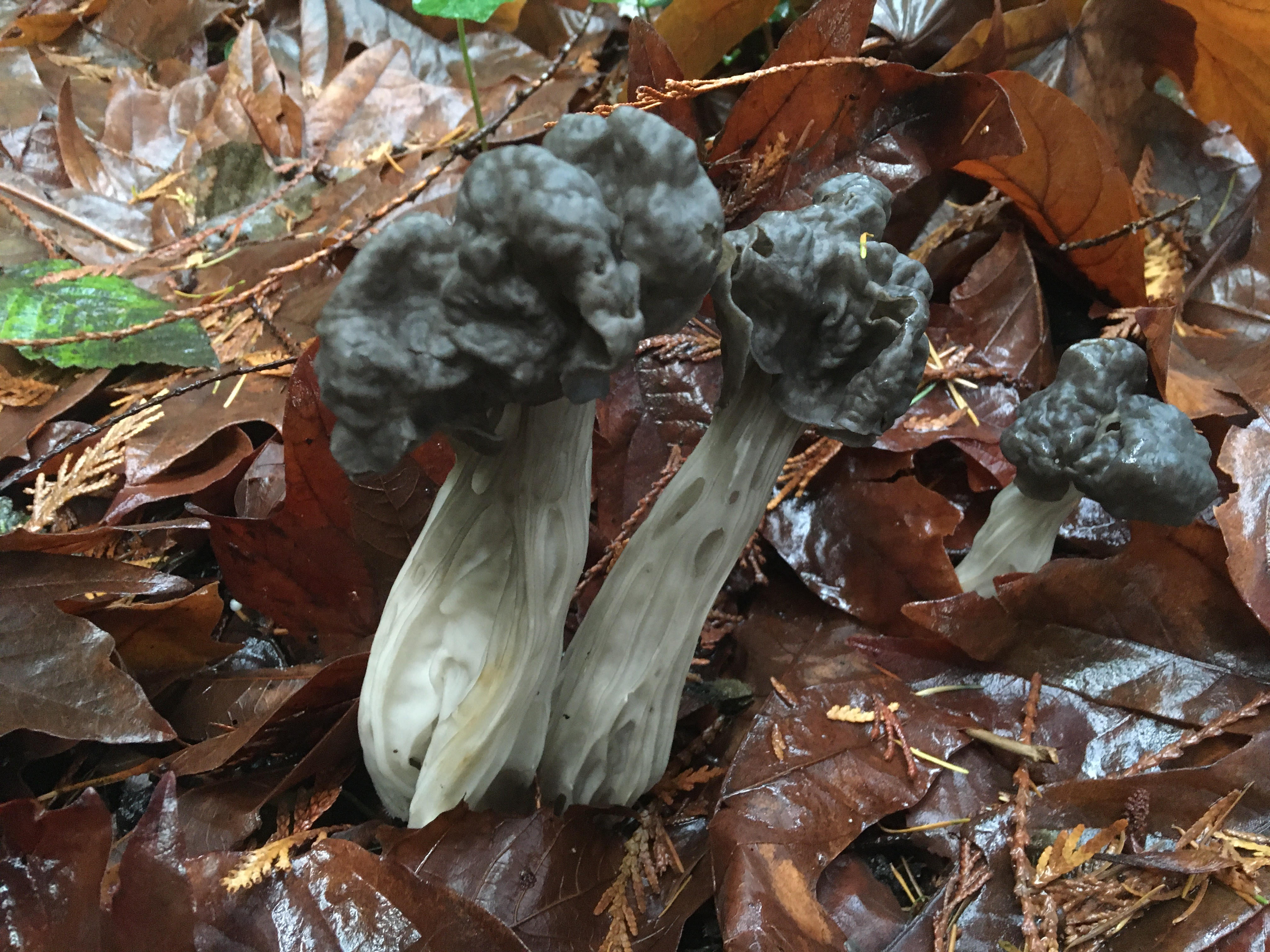

Scientific classification
- Kingdom: Fungi
- Division: Ascomycota
- Class: Pezizomycetes
- Order: Pezizales
- Family: Helvellaceae
- Genus: Helvella
- Species: H. lacunosa

Binomial name
- Helvella lacunosa (Afzel.)

= Helvella lacunosa =

Species of fungus

Helvella lacunosa Mycological characteristics
- Smooth hymenium
- Cap is convex
- Hymenium attachment is not applicable
- Stipe is bare
- Spore print is white
- Ecology is saprotrophic or mycorrhizal
- Edibility is not recommended

Helvella lacunosa, known as the slate grey saddle or fluted black elfin saddle in North America, simply as the elfin saddle in Britain, is an ascomycete fungus of the family Helvellaceae. It is one of the most common species in the genus Helvella. The mushroom is readily identified by its irregularly shaped grey cap, fluted stem, and fuzzy undersurfaces. It is usually found in Eastern North America and in Europe, near deciduous and coniferous trees in summer and autumn.

== Taxonomy ==
Scottish naturalist John Lightfoot wrote of it in his 1777 work Flora Scotica, calling Helvella mitra, or curled helvella.

The fungus was formally described by Swedish botanist Adam Afzelius in 1783. Its specific epithet is the Latin adjective lacunosa, meaning "with holes". The generic name was originally a type of Italian herb but became associated with morels. H. sulcata; once separated, because of certain differences in the lobe structure is now dropped, or just a synonym. It was not possible to draw a clear distinction between the two.

== Description ==
Helvella lacunosa not uncommonly appears to be made out of wax. It has an irregularly folded or wrinkled cap which may be shades of slatey grey to black, and measure anywhere from 1 to 10 centimetres (1/2 to 4 inches), though usually between 2 and 5 cm (1 and 2 in). The margin can be fused with the wrinkled, ringless stem, which is chambered within, measuring 3–15 cm (1–6 in) high and 1–3 cm wide. The stem may be white when young and darker with age, though may be any shade of grey. The spore print is white, and the oval spores average (12) 15–21 × (9) 11–14 μm.

Occasionally, white-capped forms are found. They may be distinguished from the creamy-white coloured Helvella crispa by the latter's furry cap undersurface and inrolled margins when young. Another similar species is H. maculata, which has a brownish cap.

== Distribution and habitat ==
This species is common in Eastern North America and is also found in Europe, Varsey Rhododendron Sanctuary in Sikkim, Japan, and China.

It is frequent in the alpine, and temperate zones of both the northern and southern hemispheres. The species occurs under pine, oak and Douglas fir and nearby parkland and lawns. Fruiting bodies appear in late summer and autumn, though have been recorded in winter in California. It often occurs on burnt ground.

Two similar looking species occur in Western North America; Helvella vespertina is associated with conifers and H. dryophila is associated with oak. The European H. lacunosa has been found in Eastern North America, but rarely in the west.

== Ecology ==
The species can be attacked by Hypomyces cervinigenus or Clitocybe sclerotoidea.

== Edibility ==
This species is eaten and regarded highly by some after thorough cooking, though the stems are not eaten. Lightfoot regarded it as edible in 1777, and several guidebooks list it as edible, yet this genus is now regarded with suspicion due to the presence of toxic compounds in several related species. It has been reported to cause gastrointestinal symptoms when eaten raw. It may contain small amounts of the toxin monomethylhydrazine, so cooking is required. Roger Phillips calls it "edible but not worthwhile".
