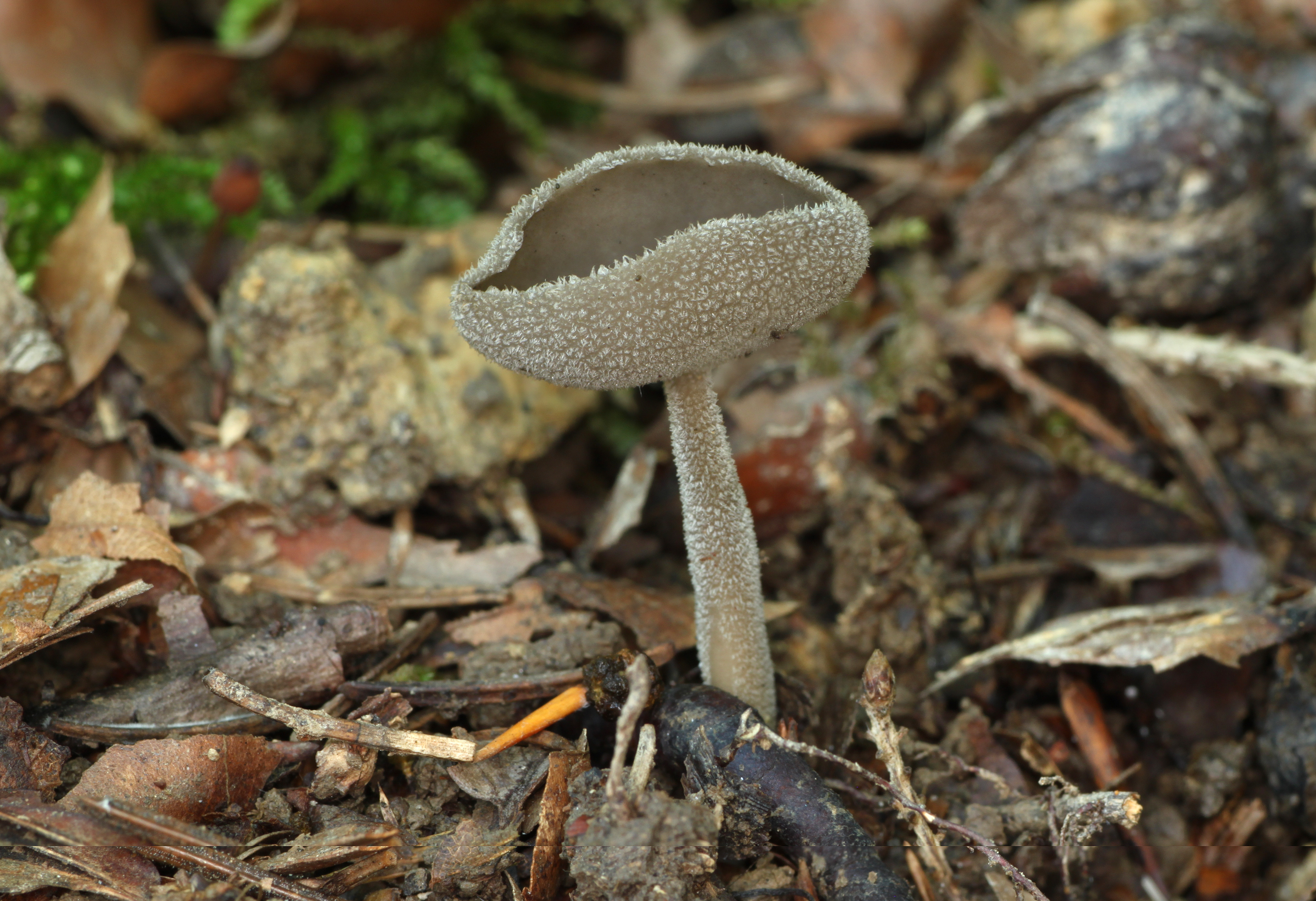

Scientific classification
- Domain: Eukaryota
- Kingdom: Fungi
- Division: Ascomycota
- Class: Pezizomycetes
- Order: Pezizales
- Family: Helvellaceae
- Genus: Helvella
- Species: H. macropus

Binomial name
- Helvella macropus (Pers.) P.Karst (1871)

Synonyms
- Peziza macropus Pers. (1796)

= Helvella macropus =

Species of fungus

Helvella macropus is a species of fungus in the family Helvellaceae of the order Pezizales. Its ascocarps are found in summer and autumn in woodland, usually (though not exclusively) associated with broad-leaved trees.

== Taxonomy ==
The fungus was originally described in 1796 by Christiaan Hendrik Persoon, who classified it in the genus Peziza. The type specimen was collected in Sweden. The taxon was transferred to the genus Helvella in 1871 by Petter Adolf Karsten.

== Description ==
The apothecium of Helvella macropus is a stalked, cup-like structure that typically forms a regular, saucer-shaped head measuring 1.5–3 cm across. Its spore-bearing surface, or hymenium, varies from yellowish to greyish-brown, and the outer cup (receptacle) is the same colour and densely covered in fine hairs (villose). The supporting stipe is slender and cylindrical, ranging from 2.5 to 12 cm in height and 3–5 mm in width, with a pubescent (hairy) surface that emphasises its hollow interior.

Beneath the hymenium lies the medullary excipulum, a loosely interwoven network of brownish hyphae about 4–6 μm wide, some inflated to 10–20 μm and constricted at their septa. Outside this is the ectal excipulum, where the innermost hyphae also form a textura intricata of cells 10–30 μm across. Toward the surface, these cells reorganise into fascicled rows of cylindrical hyphae 20–35 μm long by 10–15 μm wide, and some extend into tufts of hyphoid hairs up to 200 μm in length. The spore-bearing ascus are pleurorhynchous—originating from a hooked basal cell—and measure 240–300 × 13–16 μm, each enclosing eight ellipsoid-fusoid ascospores. These spores are 19.5–25.8 μm long by 9–12.0 μm wide and contain one large plus two to three medium-sized oil droplets (guttules). Interspersed among the asci are sterile paraphysis filaments, 3–4 μm wide at the base and swelling to 5–9 μm at their club-shaped tips.

=== Similar species ===
Similar species include H. corium, H. cupuliformis, H. fibrosa, H. pezizoides, H. queleti, and Donadinia nigrella.

== Distribution ==
This species has a wide distribution in the Northern Hemisphere, having been recorded throughout North America, as well as in Central America, Europe, China, and Japan. It can be found on the ground or on rotting wood along with moss.

== Toxicity ==
The species is inedible.
