= Helvella fibrosa =

Scientific classification
- Kingdom: Fungi
- Division: Ascomycota
- Class: Pezizomycetes
- Order: Pezizales
- Family: Helvellaceae
- Genus: Helvella
- Species: H. fibrosa

Binomial name
- Helvella fibrosa (Wallr.) Korf (2008)

Synonyms
- List: Sarcoscypha fibrosa (Wallr.) La (1887); Macropodia fibrosa (Wallr.) Sacc. (1889); Octospora villosa Hedw. (1789); Peziza macropus var. villosa (Hedw.) Pers. (1801); Peziza fibrosa Wallr. (1833); Cyathicula villosa (Hedw.) P.Karst. (1866); Fuckelina villosa (Hedw.) Kuntze (1891); Leptopodia villosa (Hedw.) Arnould (1893); Cyathipodia villosa (Hedw.) Boud. (1904); Cyathipodia villosa (Hedw.) Boud. (1907); Helvella villosa (Hedw.) Dissing & Nannf. (1966); Helvella dissingi Korf (1988)

Species of fungus

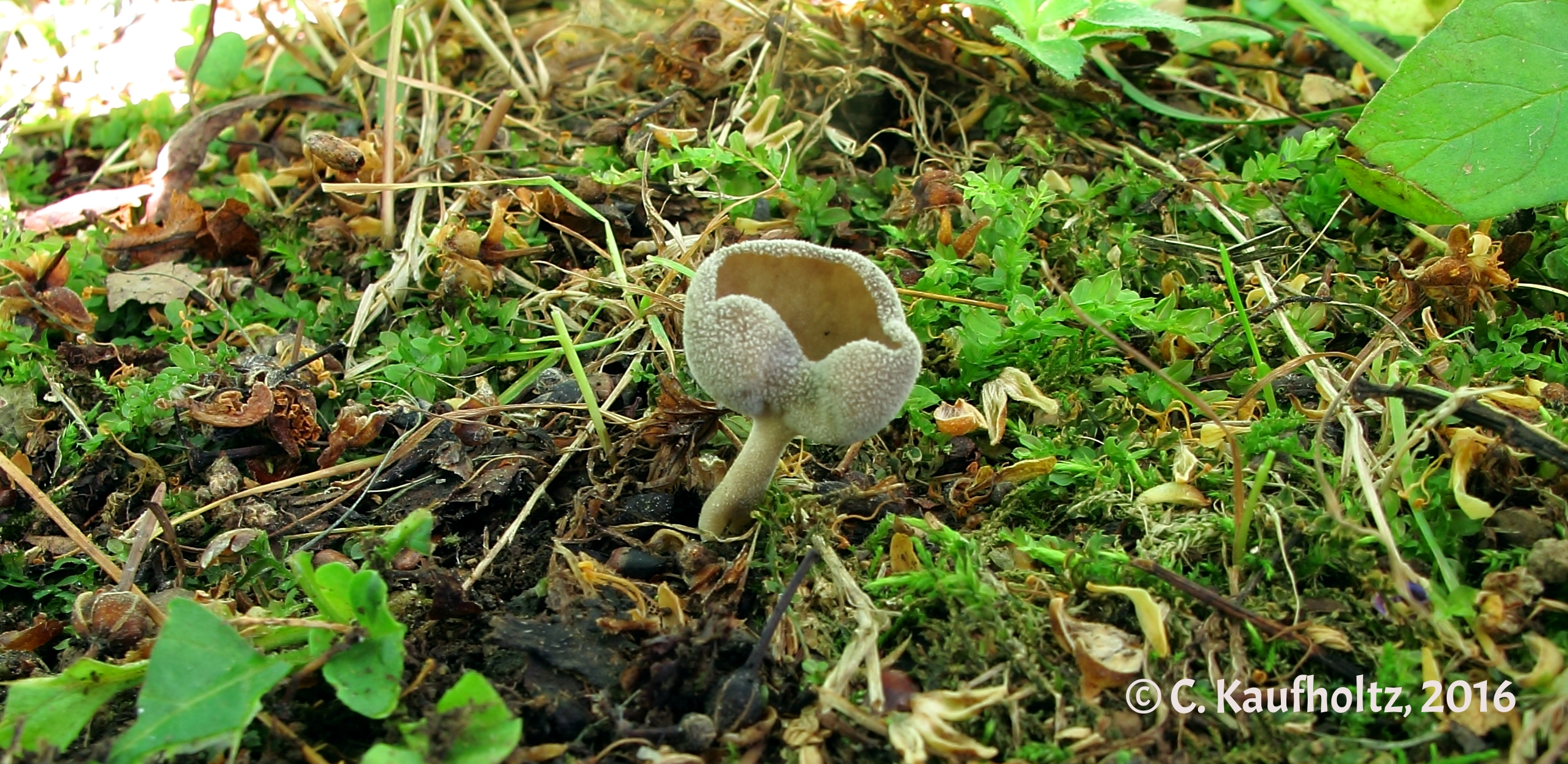
Helvella fibrosa

Helvella fibrosa is a species of fungus in the family Helvellaceae of the order Pezizales. It was originally known as Octospora villosa when first scientifically described by the German botanist Karl Friedrich Wilhelm Wallroth in 1833, and was placed in a number of different genera throughout the decades, including Peziza, Fuckelina, and Cyathipodia. The current generic placement was proposed by Richard P. Korf in 2008.

== Description ==
The fruiting body of Helvella fbrosa is delicate and small, with the cap (apothecium) measuring 5–20 mm across. When young, the apothecium resembles a cup that has been squashed from above; as it matures, it flattens into a plate-like form and its margin often splits into radial fragments. The spore-bearing surface, or hymenium, is smooth and varies in colour from grey through dark grey to brownish-grey, while the exterior (sterile surface) is covered in fine hairs, giving it a downy (pubescent) texture and a grey to grey-brown hue. The stalk, or stipe, typically stands 10–35 mm tall—usually exceeding the width of the apothecium—and is 2–6 mm thick. It is more or less cylindrical, sometimes curving slightly at the base, and bears a similar downy covering; its colour is generally grey, though creamy white forms are occasionally encountered.

Under the microscope, the spore-bearing cells known as asci are cylindrical, measure 245–310 μm by 12–14 micrometres (μm), and each contains eight spores. These asci are single-walled (uniseriate), arise from a hooked basal cell (a crozier), and do not react to iodine stains (inamyloid). The ascospores are smooth, transparent, ellipsoid structures about 16–20 μm long and 10–12.7 μm wide, each containing a prominent central oil droplet and staining readily with certain dyes (cyanophilic). Among the asci are sterile supportive filaments called paraphyses; these are similar in length to the asci, septate (with cross-walls), bear hook-like structures at the base, and display a club-shaped thickening near the tip. Their colour ranges from transparent to brownish.

The tissue layers of the apothecium (the excipulum) have distinct arrangements of hyphae. Directly beneath the hymenium lies the subhymenium, a loosely woven network of branching hyphae that appears transparent or pale greyish-brown. Beneath this is the medullary excipulum, composed of a tangled matrix of branching hyphae about 3–5 μm wide, which are greyish-brown. The outermost layer, the ectal excipulum, consists of angular or prism-shaped cells up to 35 μm across, pigmented greyish-brown. At the very surface is a palisade-like zone of several rows of cells grouped into tufts of parallel hyphae, imparting a subtle tufted texture and a transparent to greyish-brown tint.

== Habitat and distribution ==
Helvella fibrosa has a worldwide distribution. It is relatively common in deciduous and mixed forests of Europe, where it grows in humid habitats. Some countries in which the presence of this species has been confirmed with DNA analysis include Denmark, Finland, Iceland, Norway, and Sweden. H. macropus is a relative with which it has been confused many times.
