= Helvella zhongtiaoensis =

Scientific classification
- Domain: Eukaryota
- Kingdom: Fungi
- Division: Ascomycota
- Class: Pezizomycetes
- Order: Pezizales
- Family: Helvellaceae
- Genus: Helvella
- Species: H. zhongtiaoensis

Binomial name
- Helvella zhongtiaoensis J.Z.Cao & B.Liu (1990)

Species of fungus

Helvella zhongtiaoensis is a species of fungus in the family Helvellaceae. It is found in China, where it grows in the forest under Pinus tabulaeformis. The fungus was described as new to science in 1990 by Jin-Zhong Cao and Bo Liu.
