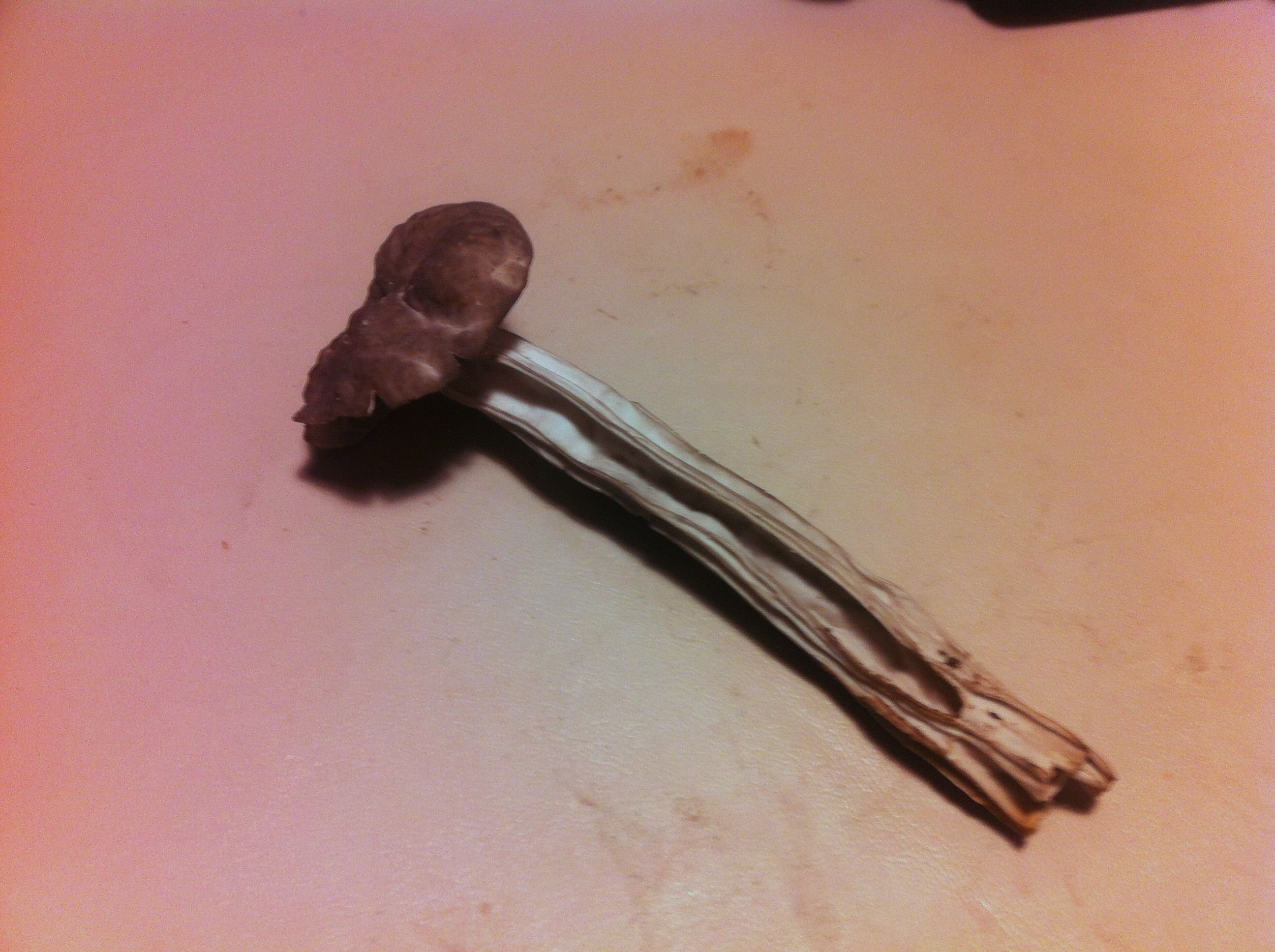

Scientific classification
- Domain: Eukaryota
- Kingdom: Fungi
- Division: Ascomycota
- Class: Pezizomycetes
- Order: Pezizales
- Family: Helvellaceae
- Genus: Helvella
- Species: H. phlebophora

Binomial name
- Helvella phlebophora Sacc.

Synonyms
- Helvella queletiana Sacc. & Traverso

= Helvella phlebophora =

Species of fungus

Helvella phlebophora is a species of fungus in the family Helvellaceae of the order Pezizales.

== Distribution ==
This species has been found in China
