= Helvella semiobruta =

Scientific classification
- Kingdom: Fungi
- Division: Ascomycota
- Class: Pezizomycetes
- Order: Pezizales
- Family: Helvellaceae
- Genus: Helvella
- Species: H. semiobruta

Binomial name
- Helvella semiobruta Donadini & Berthet (1976)

Species of mushroom-forming fungus

Helvella semiobruta is a species of mushroom-forming fungus in the family Helvellaceae, formally described in 1976. The fungus produces stalked, cap-shaped fruit bodies with lobes that start greyish white and darken to black with age, supported by a hollow stalk featuring three to five blunt longitudinal ribs. It grows in mycorrhizal association with rock rose shrubs (particularly Cistus albidus) and is primarily found in Mediterranean climates of southern Europe, though it has been recorded as far north as Sweden. The species typically fruits from January to March at elevations of 500–700 metres above sea level in maquis shrubland habitats.

== Taxonomy ==
Helvella semiobruta was formally described by Jean-Claude Donadini and Paul Berthet in 1976 in the Bulletin de la Société Mycologique de France. Molecular studies place it within the /lacunosa clade of the genus Helvella, forming a distinct lineage alongside H. helvellula, H. iberica, H. inexpectata and H. juniperi.

== Description ==
The fruit body consists of a stalked, cap‑shaped cup (an apothecium) 1.5–3 cm across. Young cups are folded and convex; as they mature they become irregularly two‑ or three‑lobed with gently wavy (undulate) margins. In fully mature specimens the lobes often fold back (deflex) and may fuse to the top of the stalk. The spore‑bearing layer (hymenium) is initially greyish white, smooth or slightly bumpy (gibbose), and darkens to black with age. The outer surface of the cup is finely scurfy (furfuraceous) at first, then develops a network of ribs and veins.

The stalk (stipe) is hollow, 1.2–4 cm tall by 0.5–2 cm thick, and bears three to five blunt longitudinal ribs with matching grooves. It is generally the same colour as the cup or slightly paler above, turning whitish at the base. Under the microscope, the inner flesh is made up of densely interwoven hyphae (textura intricata) while the outer layer consists of rows of angular to prismatic brownish cells. The elongated sac‑shaped spore‑bearing cells (asci) measure about 300–370 × 14–18 μm. Spores are oblong‑ellipsoidal, roughly 19.8–24.5 by 12.2–14.8 μm, each containing one large and several smaller oil droplets (guttules). Sterile supporting filaments (paraphyses) are thin (3–4 μm) below and expand to club‑shaped tips of 6–9 μm.

== Habitat and distribution ==
This species is characteristic of Mediterranean climates, where it grows in mycorrhizal association with shrubs of the rockrose genus Cistus, especially Cistus albidus. Fruiting bodies appear from January to March at altitudes of 500–700 m above sea level. Although predominantly recorded in southern Europe, a confirmed collection from Gotland, Sweden shows it can occur further north. It has also been collected in Greece, and Cyprus, where it grows in maquis shrubland.

It often fruits alongside close relatives such as Helvella juniperi—which has a more irregular saddle‑shaped cup and deeper furrows on its stalk—and the cup‑shaped Helvella helvellula, but can be distinguished by its more regular cap morphology and fewer, less prominent ribs on the stipe.
