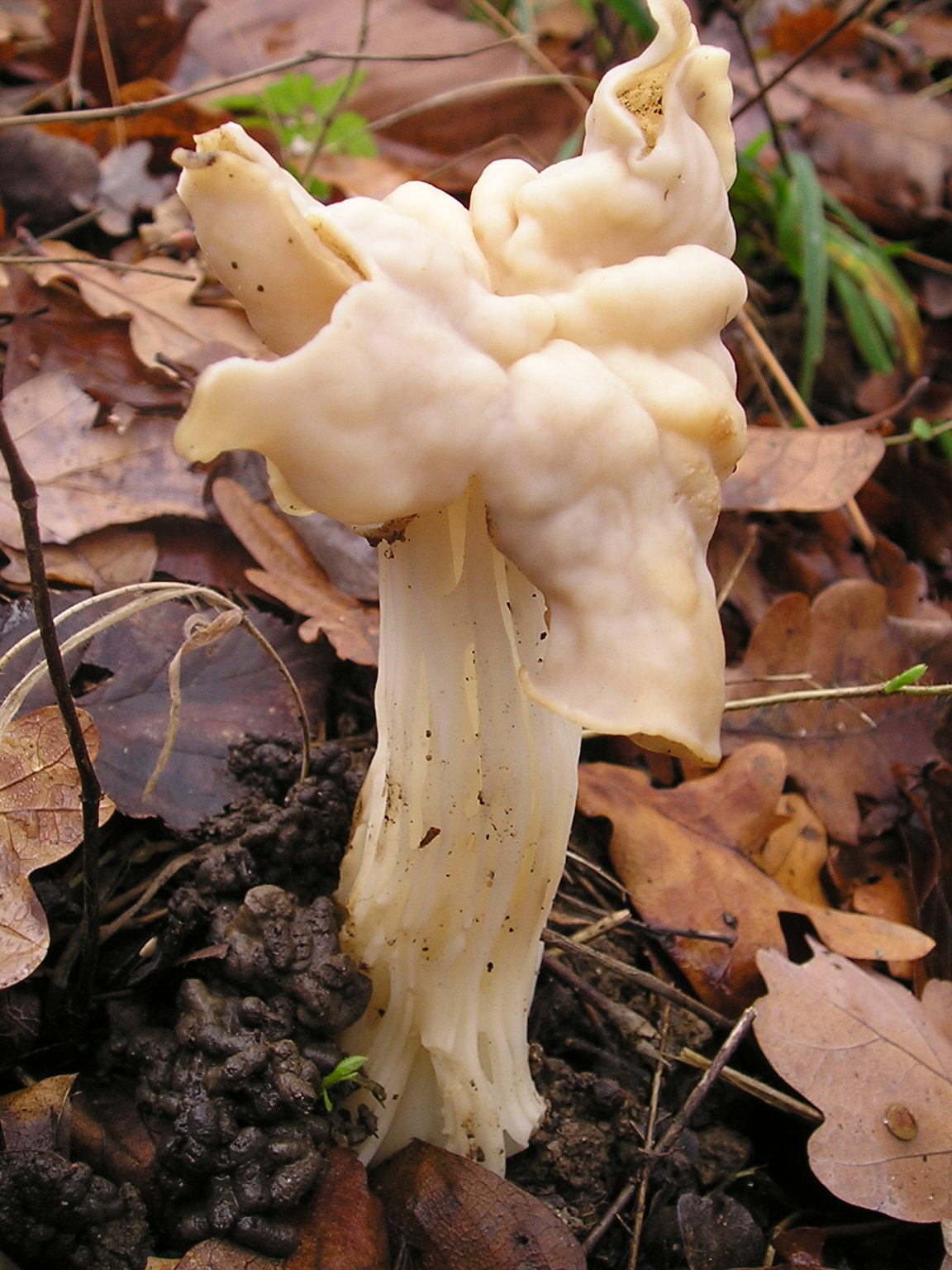
- Helvella crispa

Scientific classification
- Kingdom: Fungi
- Division: Ascomycota
- Class: Pezizomycetes
- Order: Pezizales
- Family: Helvellaceae
- Genus: Helvella; Fr.

Type species
- Helvella crispa (Scop.) Fr. (1822)

= Helvella =

Genus of fungi

Helvella is a genus of ascomycete fungus of the family Helvellaceae. The mushrooms, commonly known as elfin saddles, are identified by their irregularly shaped caps, fluted stems, and fuzzy undersurfaces. They are found in North America and in Europe. Well known species include the whitish H. crispa and the grey H. lacunosa. They have been reported to cause gastrointestinal symptoms when eaten raw.

== Description ==
Species in Helvella have fruiting bodies (technically ascocarps) that grow above the ground, and usually have stems. The cup-like fruiting body (the apothecium) can assume a variety of forms: it may be shaped like an ear (auriculate), or a saddle; it may be convex or irregularly lobed and bent. The spore-bearing surface, the hymenium, can be smooth, wavy or wrinkled and can range in color from white to black or various shades of gray or brown. Similarly, the outer surface of the fruiting bodies can be smooth, ribbed, or have minute hairlike projections (villi). The stem is cylindrical and tapering or grooved and ribbed. The flesh is usually between 1–2 mm thick.

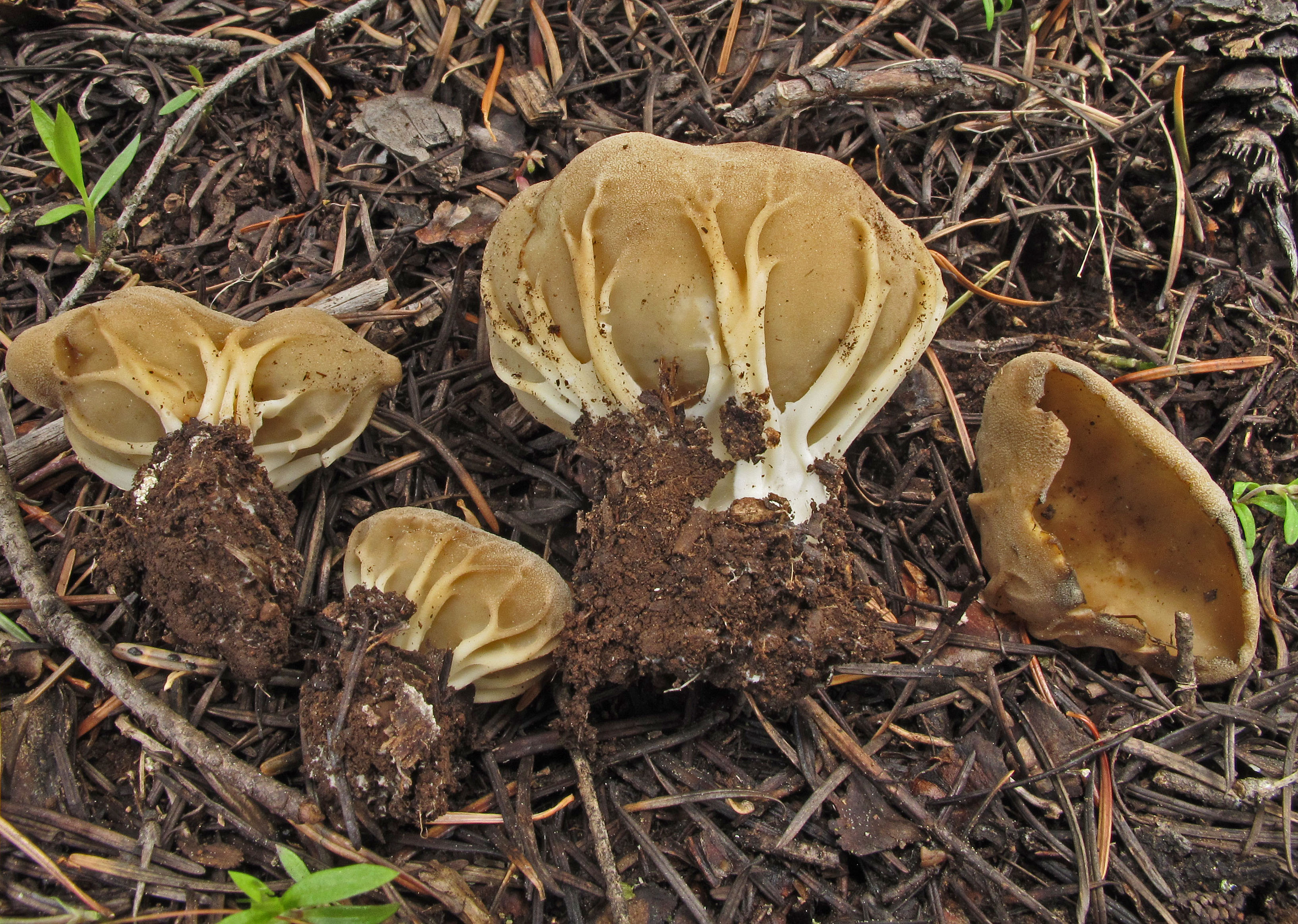
H. acetabulum

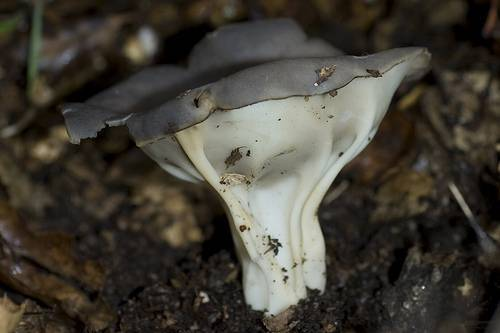
H. costifera

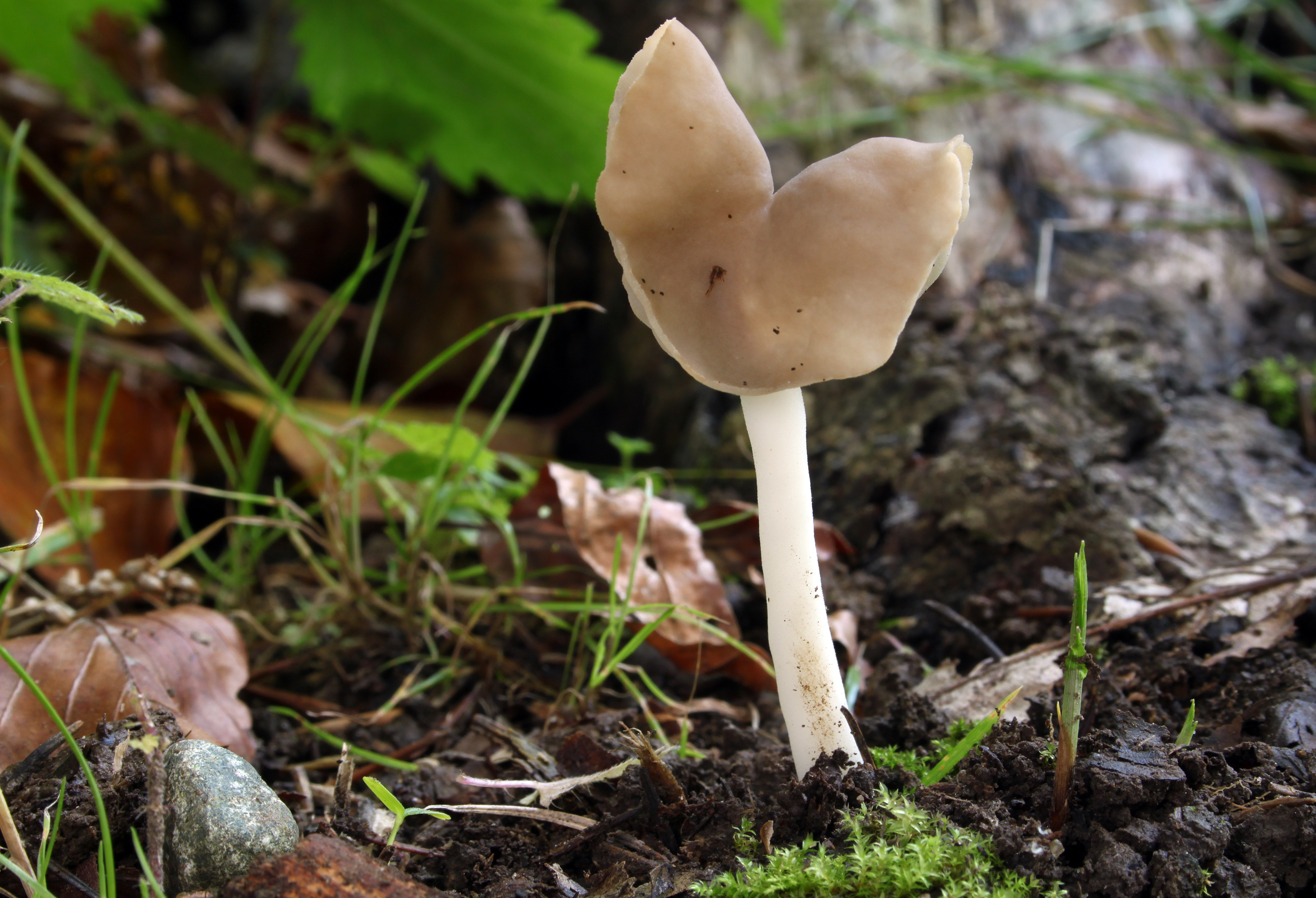
H. ephippium

== Species ==
As of September 2023, Species Fungorum has registered159 species of Helvella:

- Helvella acetabuloides
- Helvella acetabulum
- Helvella adhaerens
- Helvella affinis
- Helvella agaricoides
- Helvella albella
- Helvella albipes
- Helvella alpicola
- Helvella alpina
- Helvella arctica
- Helvella arcto-alpina
- Helvella astieri
- Helvella aterrima
- Helvella atra
- Helvella atroides
- Helvella austrooccidentalis
- Helvella bachu
- Helvella borealis
- Helvella branzeziana
- Helvella brevis
- Helvella brevissima
- Helvella bulbosa
- Helvella calycina
- Helvella capucina
- Helvella capucinoides
- Helvella carnosa
- Helvella chinensis
- Helvella cinerella
- Helvella compressa
- Helvella connivens
- Helvella constricta
- Helvella corbierei
- Helvella corium
- Helvella cornuta
- Helvella costifera
- Helvella crispa
- Helvella crispoides
- Helvella cupuliformis
- Helvella cystidiata
- Helvella danica
- Helvella dovrensis
- Helvella dryadophila
- Helvella dryophila
- Helvella dura
- Helvella elastica
- Helvella engleriana
- Helvella ephippioides
- Helvella ephippium
- Helvella faulknerae
- Helvella favrei
- Helvella fibrosa
- Helvella fistulosa
- Helvella flavida
- Helvella floriforma
- Helvella foetida
- Helvella fulva
- Helvella fusca
- Helvella fuscolacunosa
- Helvella galeriformis
- Helvella glutinosa
- Helvella griseoalba
- Helvella guttata
- Helvella heganii
- Helvella helvellula
- Helvella hispanica
- Helvella hispida
- Helvella huangii
- Helvella hyperborea
- Helvella hypocrateriformis
- Helvella iberica
- Helvella inexpectata
- Helvella involuta
- Helvella jiaohensis
- Helvella jilinensis
- Helvella jimsarica
- Helvella jizushanica
- Helvella jocatoi
- Helvella juniperi
- Helvella lactea
- Helvella lacunosa
- Helvella latispora
- Helvella leucopus
- Helvella liui
- Helvella lobata
- Helvella ludovicae
- Helvella macropus
- Helvella maculata
- Helvella maculatoides
- Helvella magna
- Helvella maroccana
- Helvella menzeliana
- Helvella mesatlantica
- Helvella minor
- Helvella monachella
- Helvella nannfeldtii
- Helvella neopallescens
- Helvella orentitomentosa
- Helvella orienticrispa
- Helvella pallidula
- Helvella papuensis
- Helvella paraphysitorquata
- Helvella parva
- Helvella pedunculata
- Helvella pezizoides
- Helvella philonotis
- Helvella phlebophora
- Helvella phlebophoroides
- Helvella phlebophoropsis
- Helvella pileata
- Helvella plateata
- Helvella platycephala
- Helvella platypodia
- Helvella pocillum
- Helvella poculiformis
- Helvella pseudoalpina
- Helvella pseudolacunosa
- Helvella pseudoreflexa
- Helvella pubescens
- Helvella pulchra
- Helvella pulla
- Helvella quadrisulca
- Helvella queletiana
- Helvella ravida
- Helvella retinervis
- Helvella rivularis
- Helvella robusta
- Helvella rossica
- Helvella rugosa
- Helvella schaefferi
- Helvella scrobiculata
- Helvella scyphoides
- Helvella semiobruta
- Helvella sichuanensis
- Helvella sinensis
- Helvella solida
- Helvella solitaria
- Helvella subfusispora
- Helvella subglabra
- Helvella sublactea
- Helvella subspadicea
- Helvella subtinta
- Helvella taiyuanensis
- Helvella terrestris
- Helvella terricola
- Helvella tianshanensis
- Helvella tinta
- Helvella ulvinenii
- Helvella umbraculiformis
- Helvella underwoodii
- Helvella unicolor
- Helvella vacini
- Helvella varia
- Helvella verruculosa
- Helvella vespertina
- Helvella vitrea
- Helvella vulgata
- Helvella xinjiangensis
- Helvella yunnanensis
- Helvella zhongtiaoensis

=== Transferred species ===
- Helvella aestivalis – now Balsamia aestivalis
- Helvella beatonii – now Geomorium beatonii
- Helvella confusa – now Dissingia confusa
- Helvella crassitunicata – now Dissingia crassitunicata
- Helvella dissingi – now Helvella fibrosa
- Helvella fuegiana – now Geomorium fuegianum
- Helvella javanica – synonym of Helvella lacunosa
- Helvella leucomelaena – now Dissingia leucomelaena
- Helvella oblongispora – now Dissingia oblongispora
- Helvella queletii – synonym of Helvella solitaria

== See also ==
- Elfin saddle
