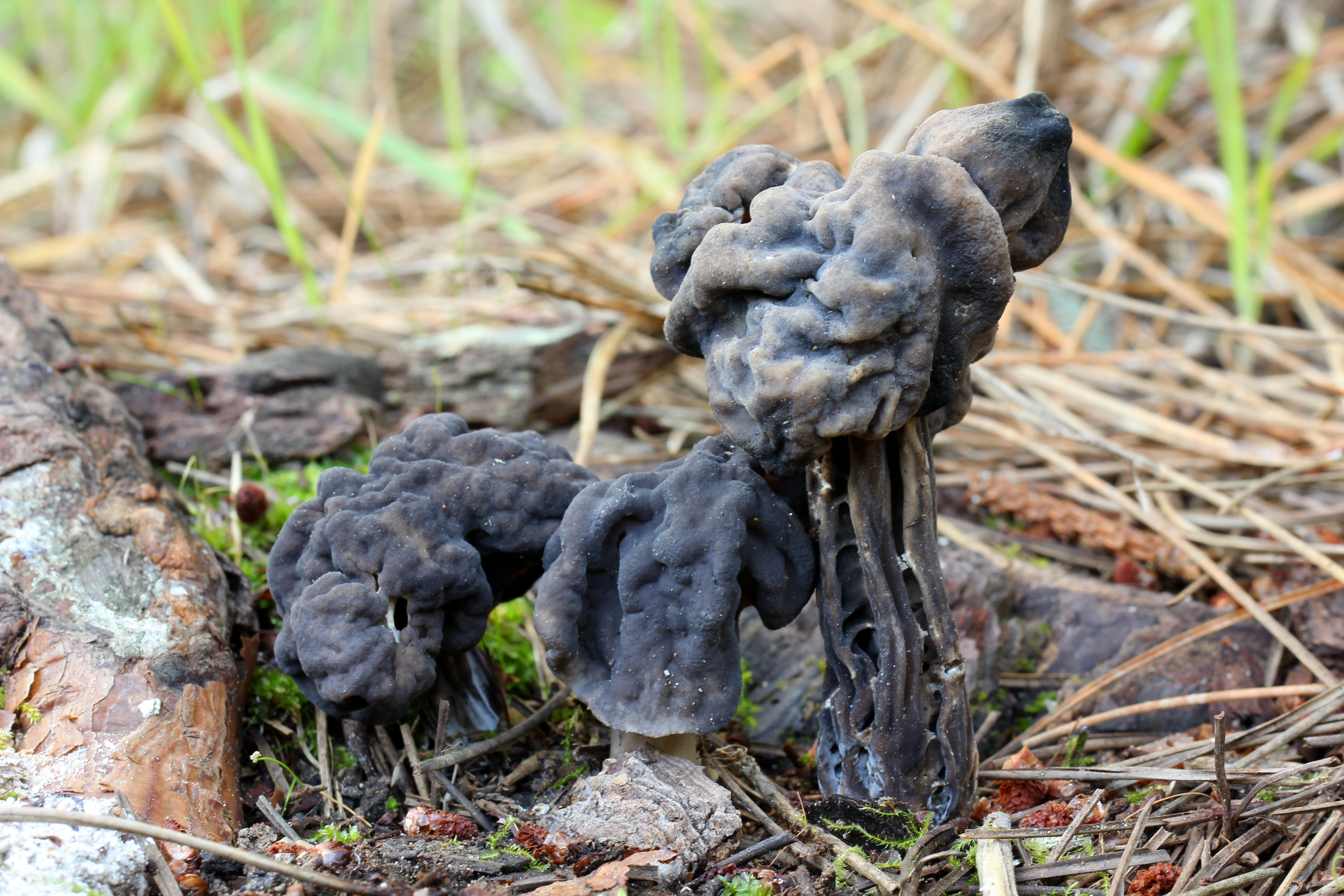

Scientific classification
- Kingdom: Fungi
- Division: Ascomycota
- Class: Pezizomycetes
- Order: Pezizales
- Family: Helvellaceae
- Genus: Helvella
- Species: H. vespertina

Binomial name
- Helvella vespertina N.H.Nguyen & Vellinga (2013)

= Helvella vespertina =

Species of fungus

Helvella vespertina is a species of fungus in the family Helvellaceae.

== Description ==
The gray-to-black cap varies in its gnarled shape, measuring about 2–7 centimetres (1–3 inches) tall and wide. The stem may be twisted or holed, from 4–15 cm (1 1/2–6 in) tall and 2–3 cm (3/4–1 1/4 in) thick, varying in color to be dark like the cap, bright white, or faded between two shades, and can display yellowish spots. The stem is chambered within. The flesh is brittle. The spore print is white.

=== Similar species ===
Similar species include H. crispa and H. dryophila.

== Distribution and habitat ==
It is found in Western North America under conifers from September to March.

== Ecology ==
The parasitic Ascomycete fungus Hypomyces cervinigenus may colonise H. vespertina, often producing a white moldy appearance.
