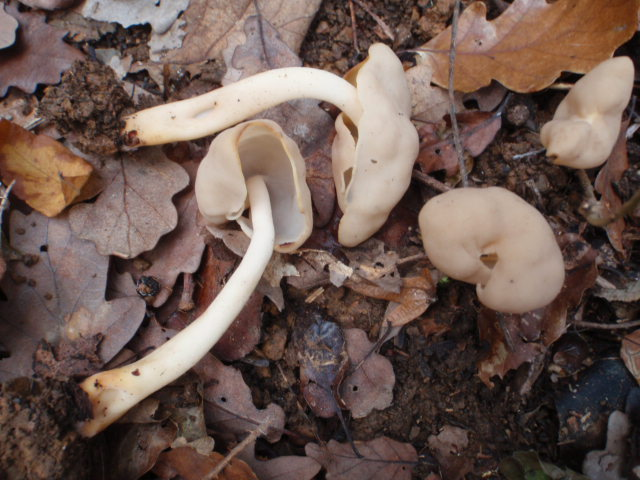

Conservation status
- Apparently Secure (NatureServe)

Scientific classification
- Domain: Eukaryota
- Kingdom: Fungi
- Division: Ascomycota
- Class: Pezizomycetes
- Order: Pezizales
- Family: Helvellaceae
- Genus: Helvella
- Species: H. elastica

Binomial name
- Helvella elastica Bull. (1785)

Synonyms
- Leptopodia elastica (Bull.) Boud. (1907)

= Helvella elastica =

Species of fungus

Helvella elastica Mycological characteristics
- Smooth hymenium
- Cap is convex
- Hymenium attachment is not applicable
- Stipe is bare
- Spore print is white
- Ecology is mycorrhizal
- Edibility is not recommended

Helvella elastica, commonly known as the flexible Helvella, elastic saddle, or brown elfin saddle, is a species of fungus in the family Helvellaceae of the order Pezizales. It has a roughly saddle-shaped yellow-brown cap atop a whitish stipe. It grows on soil in woods in Eurasia and North America.

== Description ==
The fruit body of the fungus is grayish or olive-brown, saddle- or mitral-shaped (i.e., resembling a double mitre) and is attached only to the top of the stipe; it may be up to 3.5 centimetres (1 1/2 inches) wide. The underside is white. The stipe is white, solid or filled with loosely stuffed hyphae, has a smooth surface, and is up to 8 cm (3 1/8 in) long by 1 cm (3/8 in) thick. The flesh of H. elastica is brittle and thin. The odor and taste are indistinct.

=== Microscopic characteristics ===
The spores are oblong to elliptical in shape, translucent (hyaline), contain one central oil drop (guttulate), and have dimensions of 18–22 by 10–14 μm; young spores have coarse surface warts, while older ones are smooth. The spore-bearing cells, the asci, are 260 by 17–19 μm. The paraphyses (sterile cells interspersed between the asci) are club-shaped, filled with oil drops, sometimes branched, and are 6–10 μm at the apex.

=== Similar species ===
The closely related fungus Helvella albipes has a thicker stipe and a two- to four-lobed cap. H. compressa and H. latispora have cap edges that are curled upward, rather than inward as in H. elastica. H. maculata has a similar cap but a ribbed stem. Gyromitra infula has an orange and more defined cap.

== Habitat and distribution ==
This fungus is typically found fruiting singly, scattered, or clustered together on the ground or on wood in coniferous and deciduous woods. It has been found in Europe, Japan, China, and western North America. It is present in summer and fall.

== Potential toxicity ==
Consumption of this fungus is not recommended as similar species in the family Helvellaceae contain the toxin gyromitrin.

== Fibrinolytic activity ==
A 2005 Korean study investigated the ability of extracts from 67 different mushroom species to perform fibrinolysis, the process of breaking down blood clots caused by the protein fibrin. H. elastica was one of seven species that had this ability; the activity of the extract was 60% of that of plasmin, the positive control used in the experiment.
