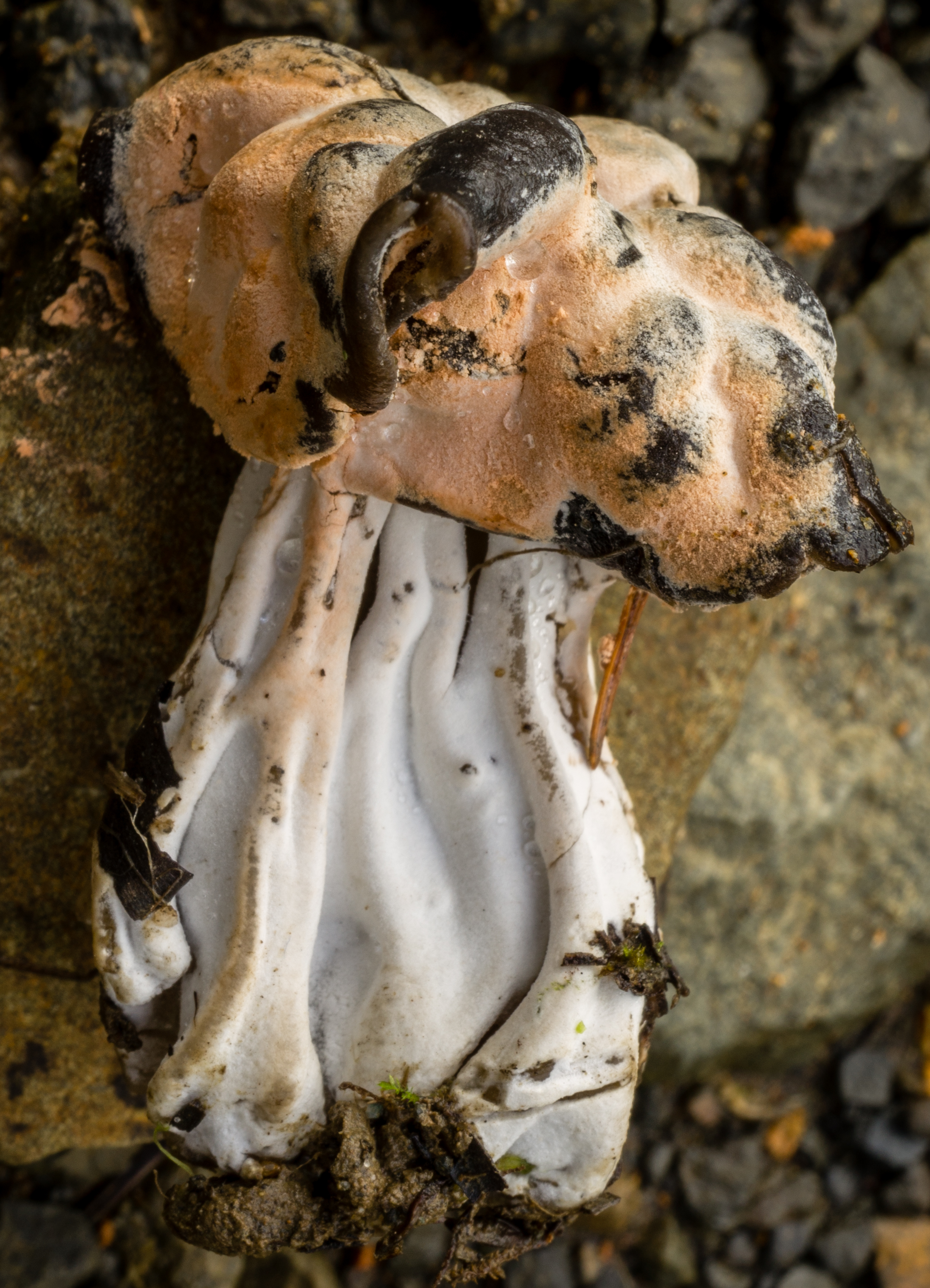
- H. cervinigenus growing on a Helvella fruit body

Scientific classification
- Domain: Eukaryota
- Kingdom: Fungi
- Division: Ascomycota
- Class: Sordariomycetes
- Order: Hypocreales
- Family: Hypocreaceae
- Genus: Hypomyces
- Species: H. cervinigenus

Binomial name
- Hypomyces cervinigenus Rogerson & Simms (1971)

= Hypomyces cervinigenus =

Species of fungus

Hypomyces cervinigenus is a parasitic ascomycete fungus that grows on elfin saddle (Helvella) mushrooms in Europe and North America.

== Taxonomy ==
The species was described as new to science in 1971 by Clark Rogerson and Horace Simms. The type collection was made in Pierce County, Washington, where the fungus was found growing on the stipe and cap of what they identified as a fruit body of Helvella lacunosa. (Later molecular work demonstrated that the European H. lacunosa is not found in North America, and that the corresponding species are H. dryophila and H. vespertina.)

Based on the original publication, H. cervinigenus appears most closely related to H. polyporinus, which has slightly apiculate spores with faint verrucosity. The authors positioned H. cervinigenus as intermediate between typical Hypomyces species (like H. lactifluorum and its allies) and H. cervinigemus in terms of ascospore characteristics.

== Description ==
H. cervinigenus has perithecia that are white to pale buff with a waxy texture. The ascospores are two-celled, smooth-walled, and measure less than 25 μm long. The anamorph form of the fungus is known as Mycogone cervina.

The fungus initially forms a white, loose, cottony subiculum (a mat-like structure of fungal threads) that becomes more compact as the reproductive structures develop. These threads (hyphae) are branched, transparent (hyaline), divided by walls (septate), and uniformly less than 3 micrometres (μm) in diameter.

The reproductive structures, called perithecia, appear as the fungus matures. These structures are either separate or densely compacted in patches up to 1 square centimetre. When fresh, the perithecia are white and translucent, but as they age and dry, they become waxy in appearance and light yellow, buff, or amber coloured. They are roughly globose (spherical) to ovate (egg-shaped) or papillate (with a nipple-like projection), measuring about 165–350 μm high by 132–265 μm wide.

The wall of each perithecium is 10–12 μm thick with a complex cellular structure. The papilla (tip) of the perithecium has a distinctive ostiole (opening) lined with filamentous structures called periphyses that are 15–20 by 2 μm in size.

Inside the perithecia are the asci, elongated sac-like structures containing the spores. These asci are long and linear, measuring about 100-–142 by 2–4.5 μm. They have thin walls except at the apex (tip), where there is a thickened cap 1–2 μm thick with a distinct pore through which spores are released. The ascospores themselves are arranged obliquely in a single row within each ascus. They are hyaline (transparent), fusiform (spindle-shaped) to cylindrical, and usually 2-celled, measuring about 15–26 by 1.5–5 μm. The spores typically have acute (pointed) ends but can sometimes have a more obtuse (blunted) lower end. The cell wall is smooth, and the cytoplasm inside often appears vacuolated, with a septum (dividing wall) in the middle that may sometimes be difficult to see.

== Distribution and habitat ==
H. cervinigenus can be found growing on elfin saddle (Helvella) mushrooms in Europe and North America.
