= Underwoodia =

Underwoodia may refer to:

- Underwoodia (fungus), a genus in the ascomycete family Helvellaceae
- Underwoodia (millipede), a genus in the millipede family Caseyidae
