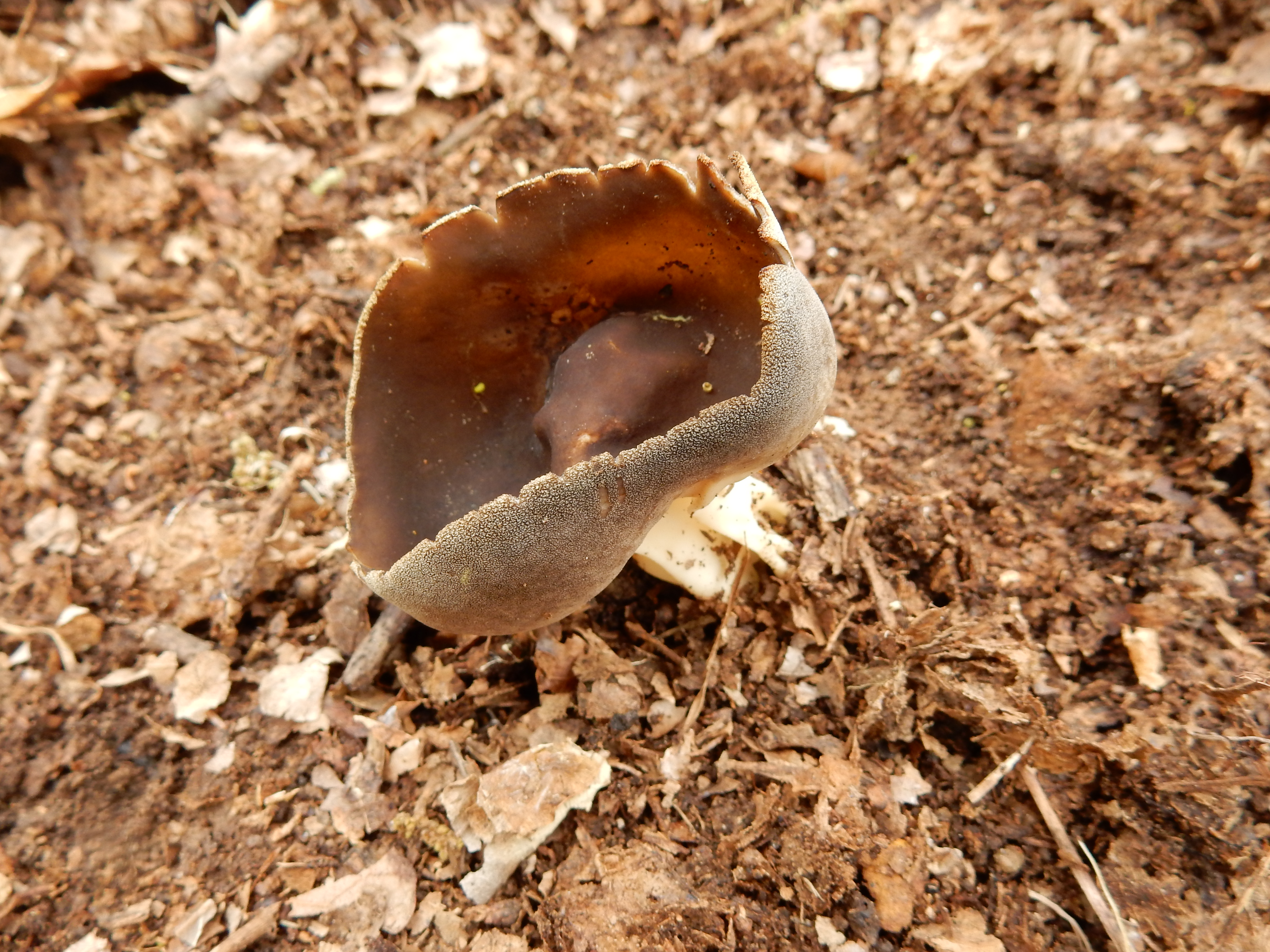

Scientific classification
- Domain: Eukaryota
- Kingdom: Fungi
- Division: Ascomycota
- Class: Pezizomycetes
- Order: Pezizales
- Family: Helvellaceae
- Genus: Helvella
- Species: H. solitaria

Binomial name
- Helvella solitaria (P.Karst.) P.Karst. (1871)

Synonyms
- List: Peziza solitaria P.Karst. (1869); Acetabula calyx Sacc. (1873); Lachnea solitaria (P.Karst.) Bizz. & Sacc. (1876); Peziza amphora Quél. (1877); Acetabula amphora (Quél.) Sacc. (1889); Paxina calyx (Sacc.) Kuntze (1891); Paxina amphora (Quél.) Kuntze (1891)

= Helvella solitaria =

Species of fungus

Helvella solitaria is a species of fungus in the family Helvellaceae. It produces cup-shaped fruiting bodies with dark brown to black spore-bearing surfaces supported by ribbed, whitish stalks. First described by the Finnish mycologist Petter Adolf Karsten in 1871, the species is distinguished by its hollow stipe with three to six blunt ribs that continue onto the cup's base and its ellipsoid-shaped spores containing a single oil droplet.

The fungus has a boreal and temperate distribution across Europe and North America, occurring in both coniferous and mixed forests from sea level to alpine elevations of about 2,400 metres (7,900 ft). It typically grows on mineral-rich soils in various habitats, including beneath shrubs, in dryas-dominated fellfields, along grassy verges, and on roadside substrates under trembling aspen.

== Taxconomy ==
Helvella solitaria was first validly described by Petter Adolf Karsten in 1871 in Bidrag till kännedom om Finlands natur och folk, having initially appeared as Peziza solitaria in 1869—a name later ruled illegitimate as a homonym. In 1876, Bizzarri and Pier Andrea Saccardo transferred it to Lachnea solitaria. Subsequent synonyms include Giacomo Bresadola's Helvella queletii (1882), later recombined as Acetabula queletii by J. Benedix in 1962.

The holotype of Karsten's basionym was collected at Mustiala, Finland, on 21 September 1866 (PAK 3288) and is preserved at the Finnish Museum of Natural History (H). To stabilise the application of the name, an epitype was designated from a 13 July 1942 collection in Stadsskogen, Uppsala, Sweden. The type of Bresadola's H. queletii, gathered in May 1882 near Terzolas, Italy, remains housed at the herbarium in Florence (S).

== Description ==
The fruiting bodies consist of a stalked, cup- to saucer-shaped apothecium that often becomes laterally compressed with age, measuring 2.5–5 centimetres (1–2 in) across. The spore-bearing surface, or hymenium, is smooth and dark greyish-brown to brownish-black, contrasting subtly with the outer receptacle, which is the same colour or slightly paler and is finely downy (pubescent). Supporting the cup is a distinct, hollow stipe 1.5–6 cm tall and 0.8–2 cm thick, coloured whitish to pale grey. The stipe bears three to six blunt ribs separated by grooves that continue seamlessly onto the base of the cup, giving the entire structure a subtly ribbed appearance.

Beneath the hymenium lies the medullary excipulum, a layer of densely interwoven hyphae (textura intricata) 3–7 micrometres (μm) wide, forming a firm but flexible tissue. Overlying this is the ectal excipulum, composed of angular (textura angularis) cells 25–50 × 20–40 μm in size; some of these outer cells produce fascicled tufts of three to six hyphal cells that are cylindrical to club-shaped, 10–26 × 8–14 μm. The spore-bearing asci are pleurorhynchous—arising from a hooked basal cell—and measure 270–330 × 13–15 μm, each enclosing eight spores. The ascospores are ellipsoid, contain a single oil droplet (uniguttulate), and range from 18.2–21.8 μm long by 11.4–13.2 μm wide. Interspersed among the asci are paraphyses, sterile filaments 3–4 μm wide at the base with brown-walled, granular contents, which swell to 5–8 μm at their club-shaped tips.

== Habitat and distribution ==
Helvella solitaria has a boreal and temperate distribution. It is most often encountered in both coniferous and mixed forests, ranging from lowland woodlands to alpine zones. It typically fruits on the ground, favouring mineral-rich soils beneath shrubs such as willows and in dryas‐dominated fellfield associations, but it has also been recorded on grassy verges and even roadside substrates under trembling aspen. Fruiting bodies appear from early summer into autumn, with collections documented at elevations from near sea level up to around 2,400 metres (7,900 ft).

This species is widespread across Europe, with confirmed records from Iceland, Norway, Sweden, Switzerland and France, extending eastwards into the Caucasus region of Georgia and northern Russia. Beyond Europe, it has been sequenced from North America, notably in Alberta, Canada, indicating a broader Holarctic distribution.
