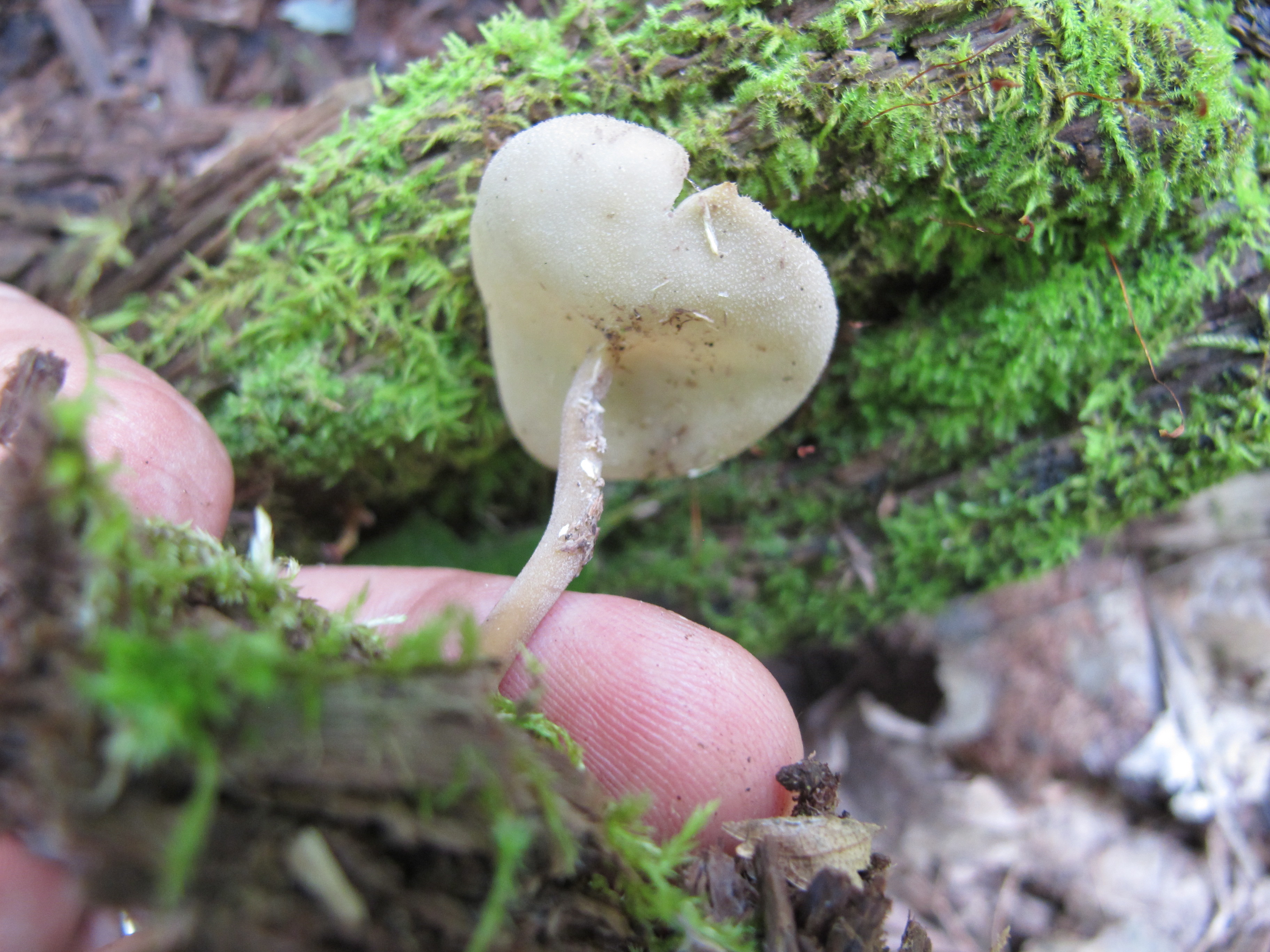

Scientific classification
- Domain: Eukaryota
- Kingdom: Fungi
- Division: Ascomycota
- Class: Pezizomycetes
- Order: Pezizales
- Family: Helvellaceae
- Genus: Helvella
- Species: H. cupuliformis

Binomial name
- Helvella cupuliformis Dissing & Nannf.

Synonyms
- Cyathipodia cupuliformis (Dissing & Nannf.) J. Breitenb. & F. Kränzl.

= Helvella cupuliformis =

Species of fungus

Helvella cupuliformis is a species of fungus in the family Helvellaceae of the order Pezizales, described in 1966.

== Description ==
A variant has been described from China, H. cupuliformis var. crassa that has larger fruit bodies (1.5 to 5.5 cm (0.6 to 2.2 in)) and wider spores (18–21 by 12.5–15 μm).

== Distribution ==
This species has been found in China, and Jalisco (Mexico).
