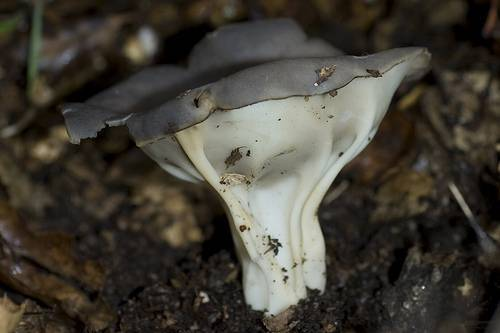

Scientific classification
- Domain: Eukaryota
- Kingdom: Fungi
- Division: Ascomycota
- Class: Pezizomycetes
- Order: Pezizales
- Family: Helvellaceae
- Genus: Helvella
- Species: H. costifera

Binomial name
- Helvella costifera Nannf. (1953)

Synonyms
- Acetabula costifera ([S.Lundell & Nannf.) Benedix (1965); Paxina costifera (Nannf.) Stangel (1963)

= Helvella costifera =

Species of fungus

Helvella costifera is a species of fungus in the family Helvellaceae. It produces distinctive cup-shaped fruiting bodies supported by a ribbed stalk. The fungus features greyish to greyish-brown caps with prominent yellowish-white ribs that extend from the hollow stalk and branch into forks on the cup's undersurface. First described scientifically in 1953, H. costifera has a widespread distribution across Europe, Asia, and North America, including China, Spain, Scandinavia, and Mexico.

== Description ==
The apothecia of Helvella costifera are regularly stalked cup-shaped fruiting bodies (stipitate-cupulate), measuring 1.5–4 cm across and 1–4 cm tall. The inner spore-bearing surface, or hymenium, appears greyish when fresh and dries to a dark greyish-brown. Externally, the cup (receptacle) is slightly downy (subpubescent) and matches the hymenium’s colour in fresh specimens, later becoming pale greyish-brown on drying. A distinct, hollow stipe supports the cup and bears five to six prominent, blunt-edged ribs of yellowish-white that extend onto the underside of the cup. These ribs branch into two forks (dichotomously) near the apex without interconnecting and remain whitish even in dried specimens.

Under the microscope, the outer tissue layer (excipulum) consists of prism-shaped to angular cells, with the outermost cell walls lightly pigmented brown. The spore-bearing asci are pleurorhynchous—arising from a hook-shaped basal cell (crozier)—and measure 230–270 × 12–15 μm, each enclosing eight spores. The ascospores are broadly ellipsoid, 14.2–16.6 × 10.6–13.6 μm, smooth and transparent. Interspersed among the asci are sterile supportive filaments called paraphyses, which are straight, septate and 2.0–3.2 μm wide at the base, gradually swelling to about 4.5 μm at their tips.

== Distribution ==
This species has been found in China, and North America (including Mexico). In Europe, it has been documented from Spain, Denmark, Norway, and Sweden.
