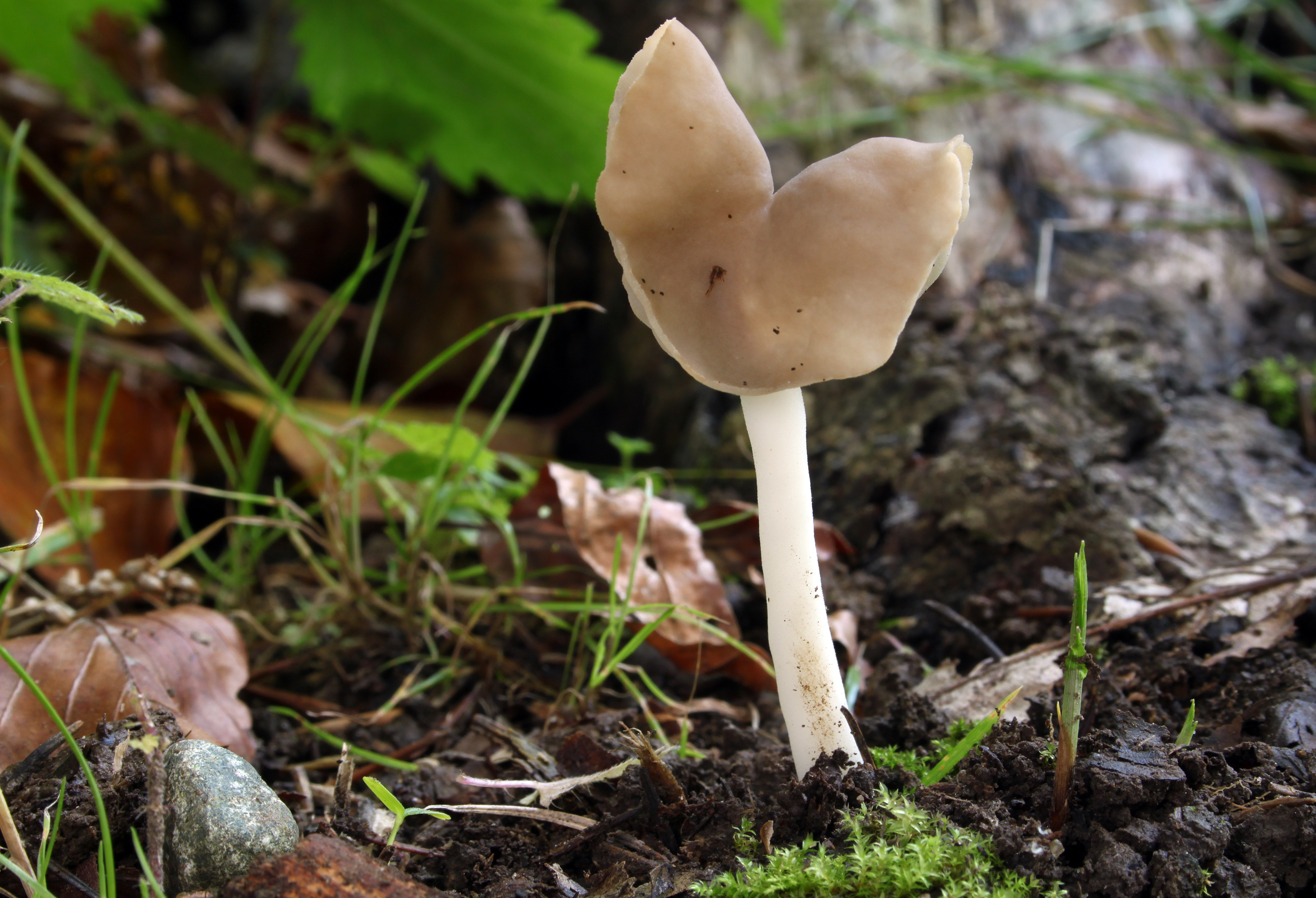

Scientific classification
- Domain: Eukaryota
- Kingdom: Fungi
- Division: Ascomycota
- Class: Pezizomycetes
- Order: Pezizales
- Family: Helvellaceae
- Genus: Helvella
- Species: H. ephippium

Binomial name
- Helvella ephippium Lév. (1841)

Synonyms
- Helvella atra var. murina (Boud.) Keissl. Helvella murina (Boud.) Sacc. & Traverso; Leptopodia ephippium (Lév.) Boud. Leptopodia murina Boud.

= Helvella ephippium =

Species of fungus

Helvella ephippium is a species of fungus in the family Helvellaceae, Pezizales order. It appears in summer and autumn as an upright white stem up to 5 centimetres (2 inches) tall supporting a greyish-brown saddle-shaped cap. It is found in woodland and is variously listed as inedible or "edible but uninspiring".

== Distribution ==
This is a European species, also recorded in China.
