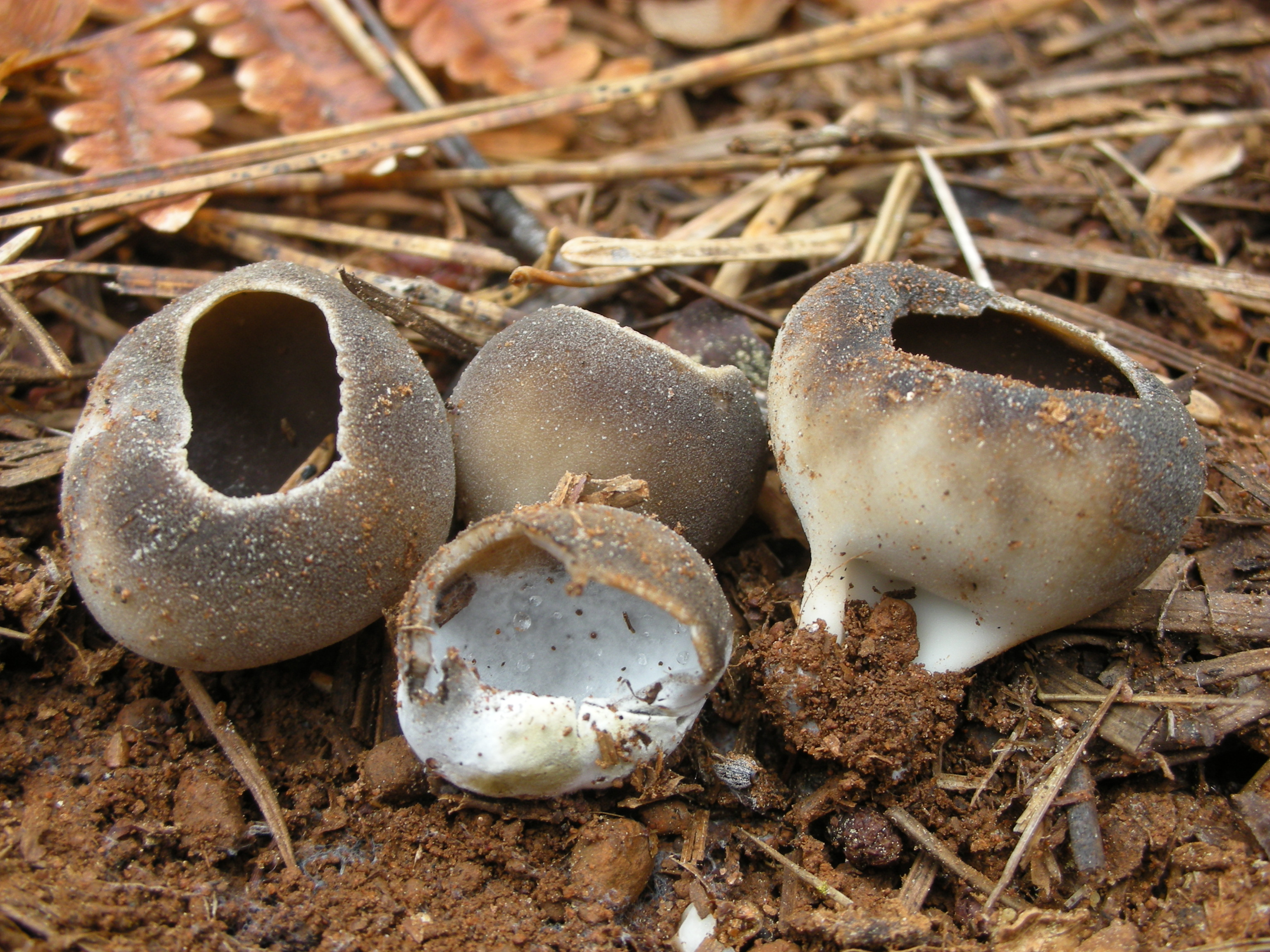
- Found in Tuolumne County, California

Scientific classification
- Kingdom: Fungi
- Division: Ascomycota
- Class: Pezizomycetes
- Order: Pezizales
- Family: Helvellaceae
- Genus: Dissingia
- Species: D. leucomelaena

Binomial name
- Dissingia leucomelaena (Pers.) (Pers.) K. Hansen & X.H. Wang

Synonyms
- Paxina leucomelas (Pers.) Kuntze; Helvella leucomelaena (Pers.) Nannf.

= Dissingia leucomelaena =

Species of fungus

Dissingia leucomelaena, commonly known as the white-footed elf cup, is a species of fungus in the family Helvellaceae of the order Pezizales. As its common name implies, it is characterized by the white coloring of its stem.

== Description ==
The deeply cup-shaped cap of the fruiting body is up to 3 centimetres (1 1/8 in) broad. The outer surface of the cap is blackish-brown near the top, with the color turning to white as it near the stem; the inner surface of the cup is blackish. The stem can be up to 4 cm (1 5/8 in) long by 0.5 cm (1/4 in) thick, with ribs or folds extending onto the undersurface of the cap.

Helvella acetabulum is a similar species, with more defined ribs.

== Distribution ==
In North America, this fungus is rare, but it has been collected in California, Alaska, and the Rocky Mountains. It has also been found in South America and Europe. It typically grows in coniferous forests, and the white stipe may be hidden or obscured by leaves or may be partially buried in the soil. It can be found from spring to early summer.

== Edibility ==
Consumption of this fungus is not recommended as similar species in the family Helvellaceae contain the toxin gyromitrin.
