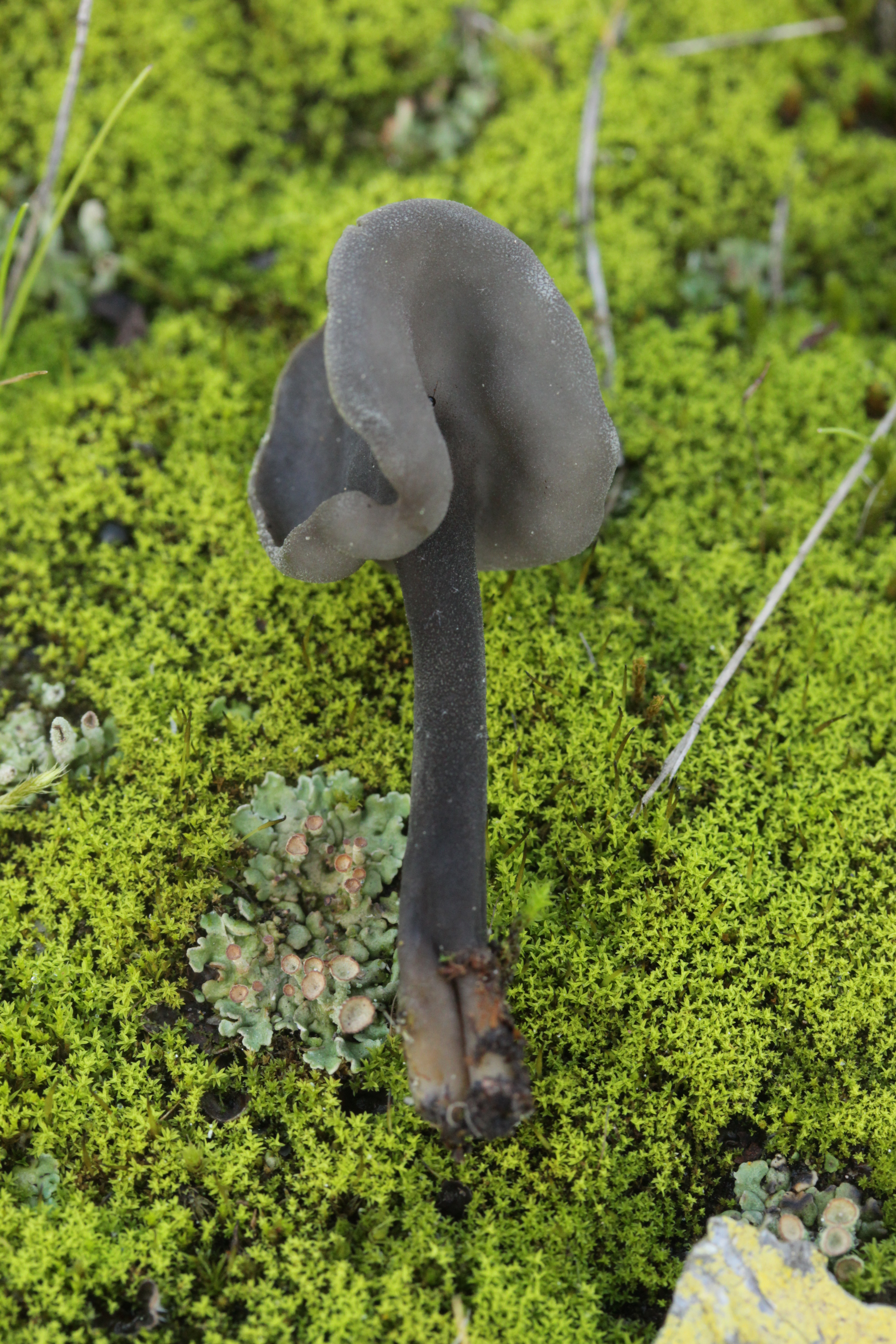

Scientific classification
- Kingdom: Fungi
- Division: Ascomycota
- Class: Pezizomycetes
- Order: Pezizales
- Family: Helvellaceae
- Genus: Helvella
- Species: H. atra

Binomial name
- Helvella atra J. König

Synonyms
- Leptopodia atra (J. König) Boud

= Helvella atra =

Species of fungus

Helvella atra, commonly known as the dark elfin saddle, is a species of fungus in the family Helvellaceae of the order Pezizales.

== Description ==
The gray mushroom has a saddle-shaped cap, up to 2 centimetres (3/4 in) tall and wide. The stalk is up to 3.5 cm long and 5 millimetres (1/4 in) thick.

== Distribution ==
This species has been found in China and Japan. It is listed in A Field Guide to Mushrooms of the Carolinas and has been reported on iNaturalist as having been found once in western North Carolina and across similar latitudes, including several times across the Eastern US, in Europe, Russia, etc.
