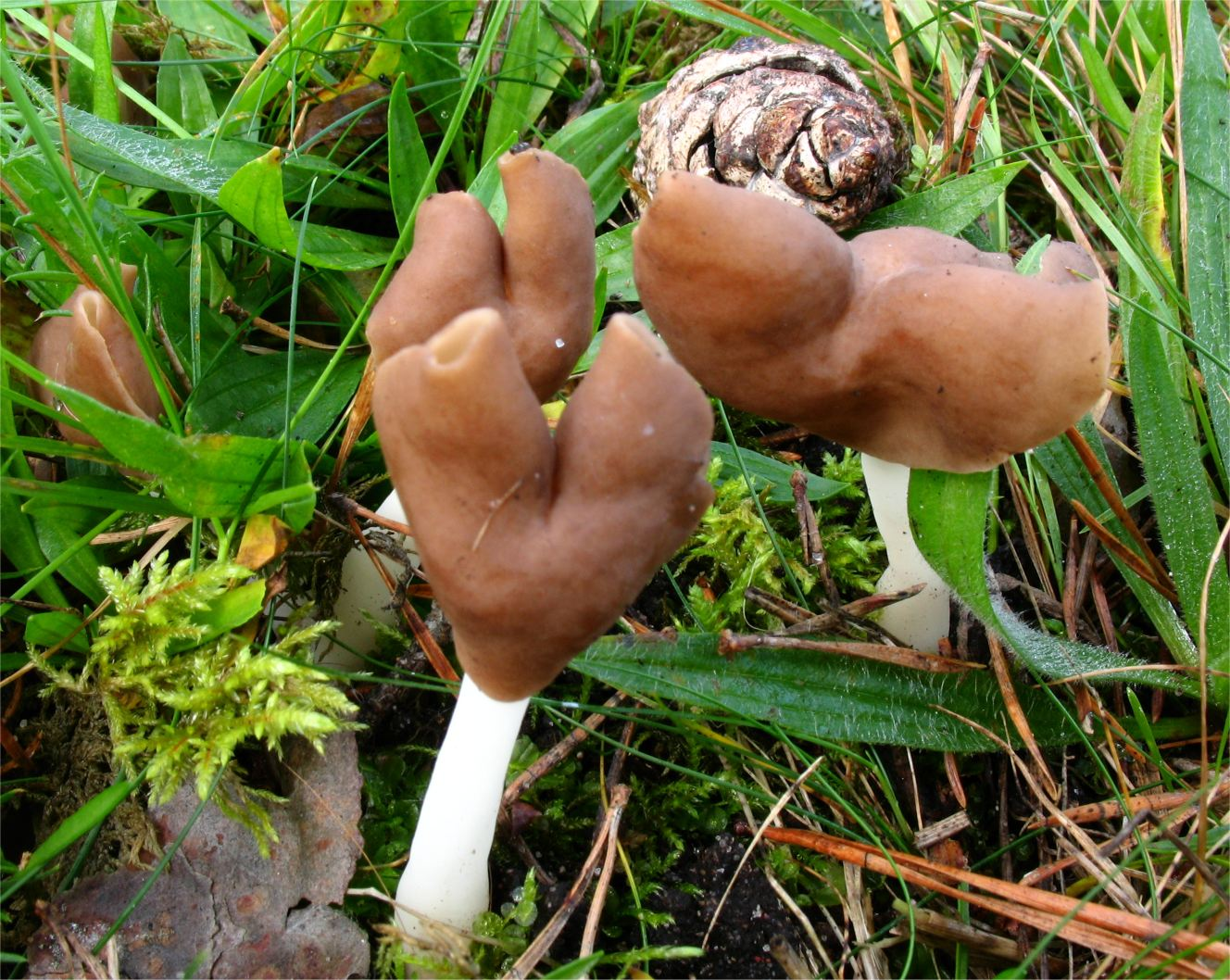

Scientific classification
- Domain: Eukaryota
- Kingdom: Fungi
- Division: Ascomycota
- Class: Pezizomycetes
- Order: Pezizales
- Family: Helvellaceae
- Genus: Helvella
- Species: H. albella

Binomial name
- Helvella albella Quél. (1896)

Synonyms
- Leptopodia albella (Quél.) Boud. (1907)

= Helvella albella =

Species of fungus

Helvella albella is a species of fungus in the family Helvellaceae that is found in Europe and North America. It was described by French mycologist Lucien Quélet in 1896.
