= Elfin saddle =

Name for several species of fungus

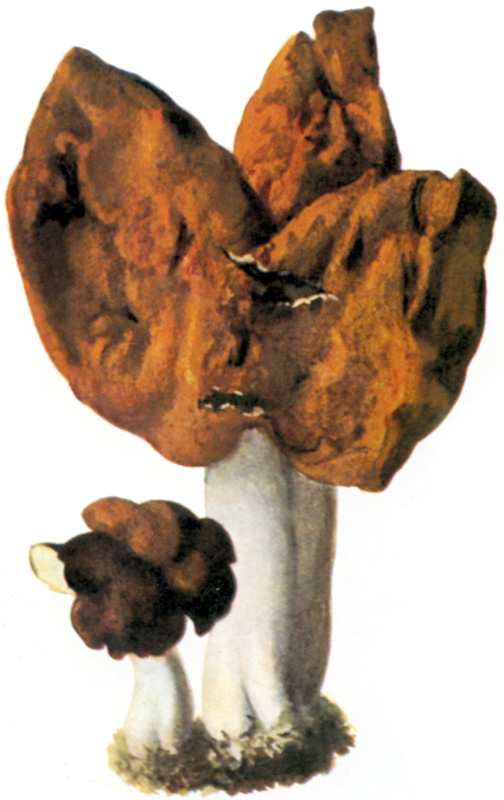
Gyromitra infula, one of several species known as an "elfin saddle"

The common name elfin saddle is given to a number of Ascomycete fungi in the order Pezizales. These medium to small fungi often have irregular saddle-shaped caps. Species include:

- Gyromitra infula (elfin saddle)
- Helvella lacunosa (fluted black elfin saddle)
- Helvella elastica (brown elfin saddle)
- Helvella crispa (elfin saddle)
