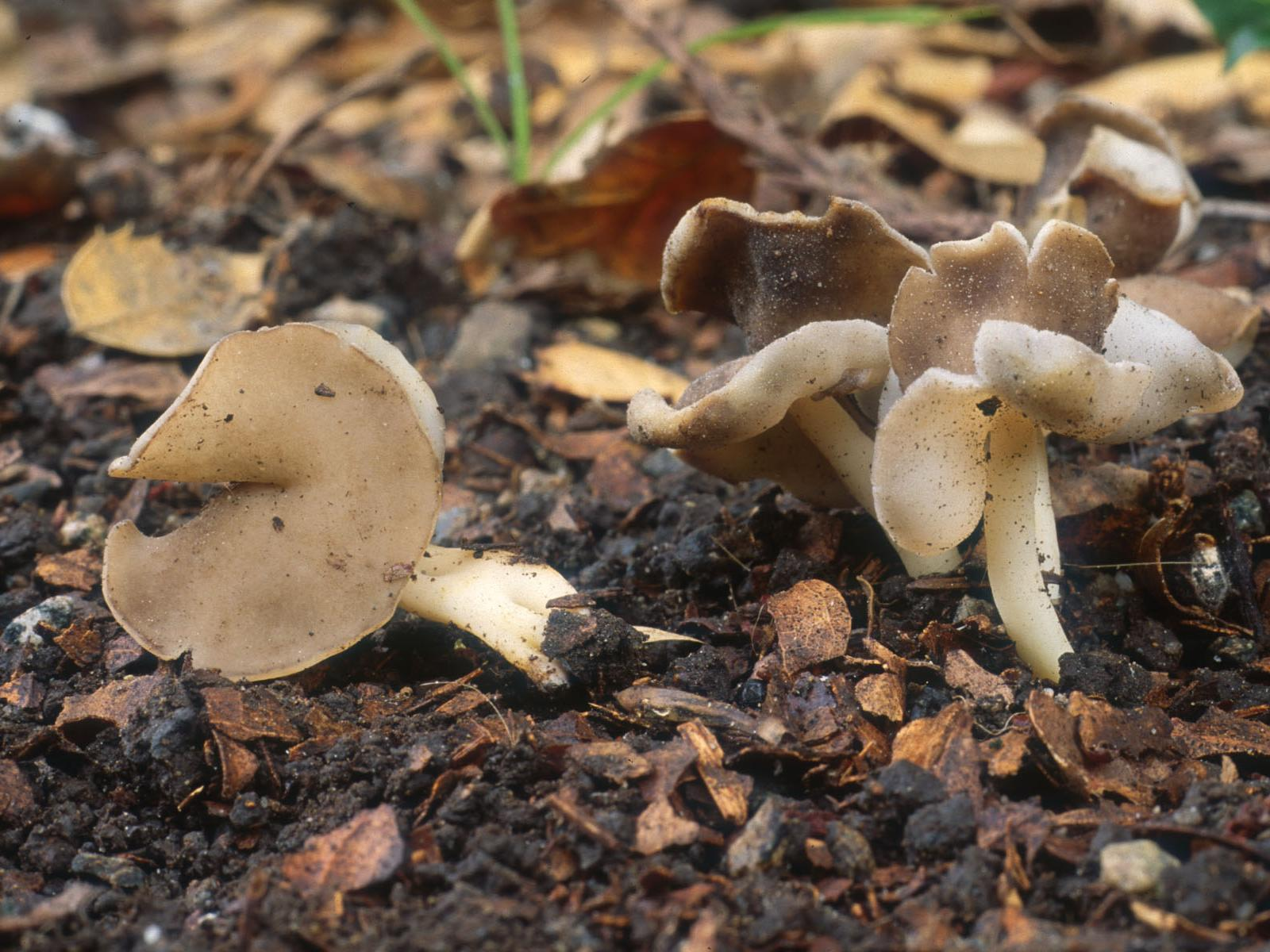
- Found in Soquel, California

Scientific classification
- Domain: Eukaryota
- Kingdom: Fungi
- Division: Ascomycota
- Class: Pezizomycetes
- Order: Pezizales
- Family: Helvellaceae
- Genus: Helvella
- Species: H. latispora

Binomial name
- Helvella latispora Boud., 1898

Synonyms
- Helvella stevensii Peck. Leptopodia stevensii (Peck) Le Gal

= Helvella latispora =

Species of fungus

Helvella latispora is a species of fungus in the family Helvellaceae of the order Pezizales. Ascocarps appear in late summer and autumn as pale stems up to 5 cm in height topped by a greyish saddle shaped cap.

== Edibility ==
Consumption of this fungus is not recommended as similar species in the family Helvellaceae contain the toxin gyromitrin.
