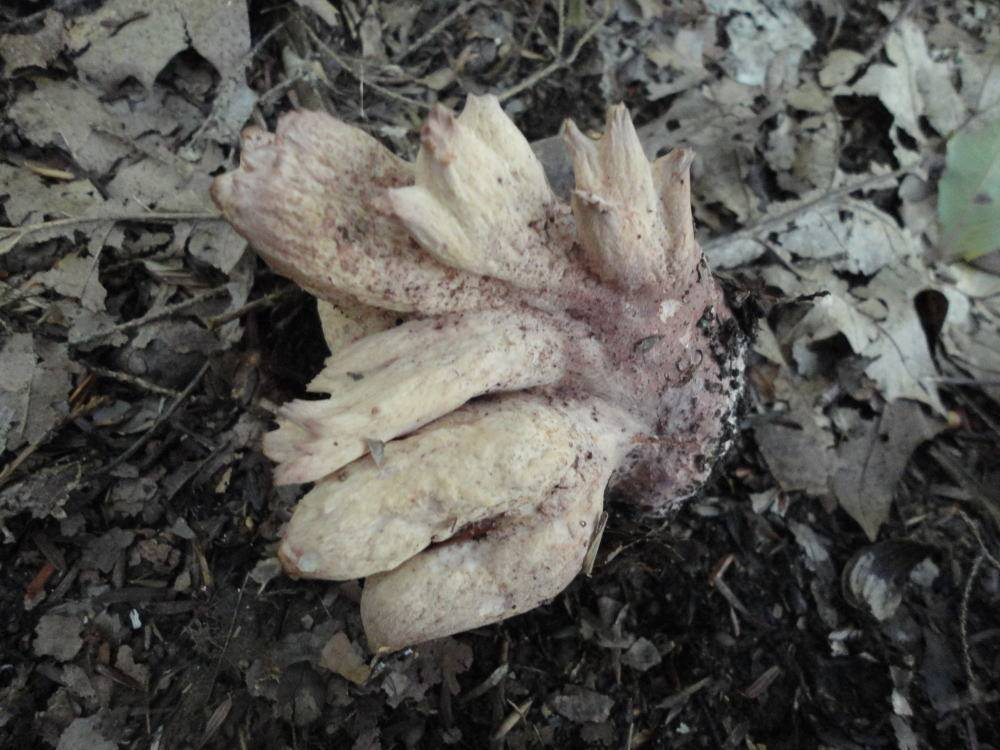
- Underwoodia columnaris

Scientific classification
- Kingdom: Fungi
- Division: Ascomycota
- Class: Pezizomycetes
- Order: Pezizales
- Family: Helvellaceae
- Genus: Underwoodia; Peck (1890)

Type species
- Underwoodia columnaris Peck (1890)

= Underwoodia (fungus) =

Genus of fungi

Underwoodia is a genus of ascomycete fungi in the order Pezizales. The widespread genus contained many species, before they were transferred to the Geomorium genus. The genus, described by Charles Horton Peck in 1890, honors mycologist Lucien Marcus Underwood.

== Species ==
As accepted by Species Fungorum;

- Underwoodia columnaris Peck (1890)

Former species;

- U. beatonii Rifai (1968) = Geomorium beatonii, Geomoriaceae
- U. campbellii Sacc. (1909) = Daleomyces phillipsii, Pezizaceae
- U. fuegiana (Speg.) Gamundí (1957) = Geomorium fuegianum, Geomoriaceae
- U. fuegiana var. cabrinii Raithelh. (1983) = Geomorium fuegianum, Geomoriaceae
- U. singeri Gamundí & E. Horak (1979) = Geomorium singeri, Geomoriaceae
- U. singeri var. fulvostipitata Gamundí & E. Horak (1979) = Geomorium singeri, Geomoriaceae
- U. sparassoides (Boud.) Bánhegyi (1938) = Daleomyces phillipsii, Pezizaceae
