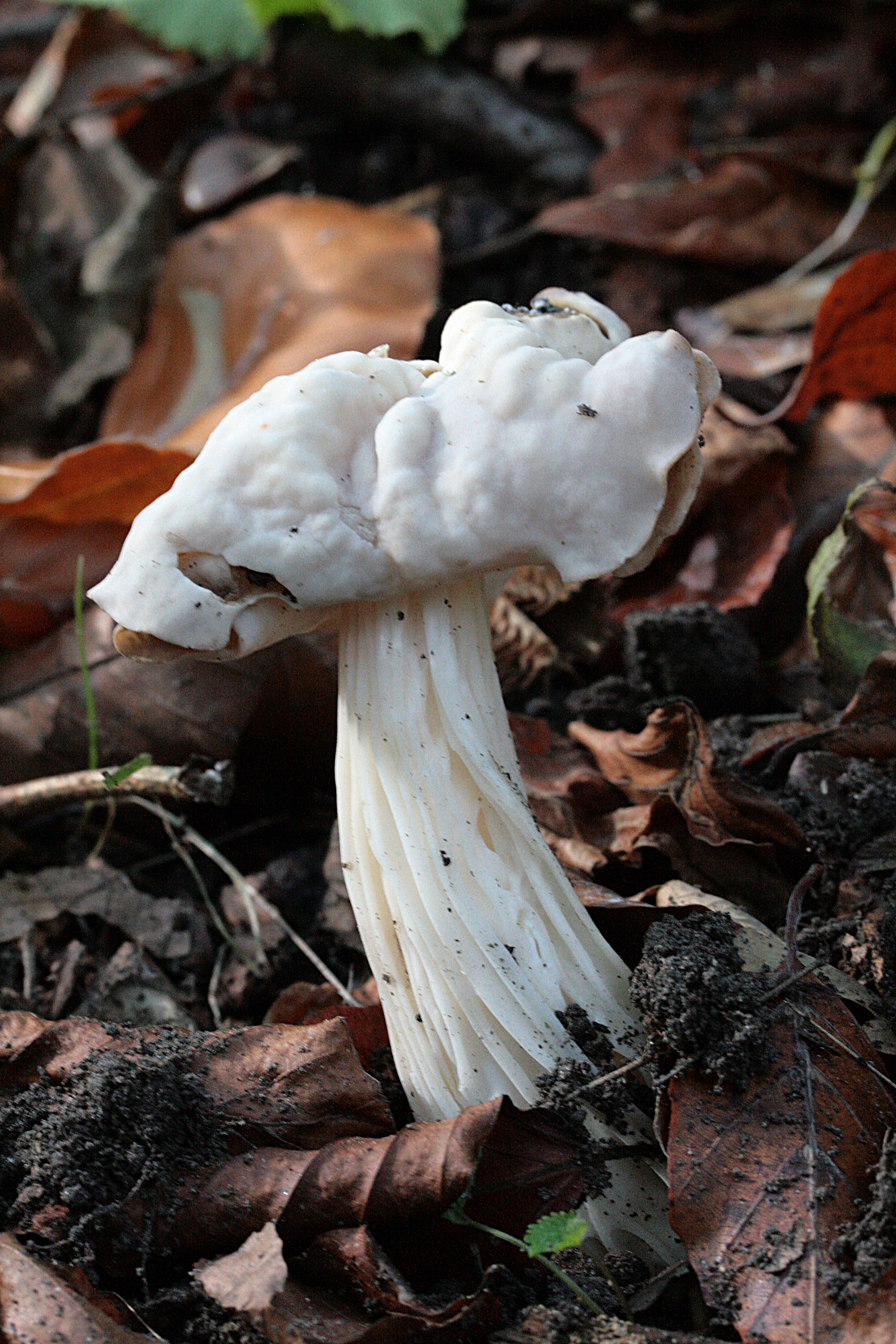

Scientific classification
- Kingdom: Fungi
- Division: Ascomycota
- Class: Pezizomycetes
- Order: Pezizales
- Family: Helvellaceae
- Genus: Helvella
- Species: H. crispa

Binomial name
- Helvella crispa (Scop.) Fr. (1822)

= Helvella crispa =

Species of fungus

Helvella crispa
- Mycological characteristics
- Smooth hymenium
- Cap is convex
- Hymenium attachment is irregular or not applicable
- Stipe is bare
- Spore print is white
- Ecology is saprotrophic or mycorrhizal
- Edibility is poisonous

Helvella crispa, also known as the fluted white elfin saddle, white saddle, elfin saddle or common helvel, is an ascomycete fungus of the family Helvellaceae. The mushroom is readily identified by its irregularly shaped whitish cap, fluted stem, and fuzzy undersurfaces. It is found in eastern and western North America and in Europe, near deciduous trees in summer and autumn.

== Etymology ==
The fungus was originally described as Phallus crispus by the naturalist Giovanni Antonio Scopoli in 1772. Its specific epithet is Latin adjective crispa 'wrinkled' or 'curly'. The generic name was originally a type of Italian herb but became associated with morels.

== Description ==
Helvella crispa is creamy white in colour, 6–13 centimetres (2 1/2–5 inches) in length, with a cap 2–6 cm (1–2 in) in diameter. It is striking due to its irregularly shaped lobes on the cap, but with a robust creamy-white base (2–8×1–2.5 cm in size). Its flesh is thin and brittle. The stem is 3–10 cm (1¼–4 in) long, white or pinkish in colour and ornately ribbed. It gives off a pleasant aroma, but is not edible raw.

The spore print is white and the oval spores average 19 x 11.5 μm. Occasionally white-capped forms are found. It can be distinguished from occasional white forms of Helvella lacunosa by its furry cap undersurface and inrolled margins when young.

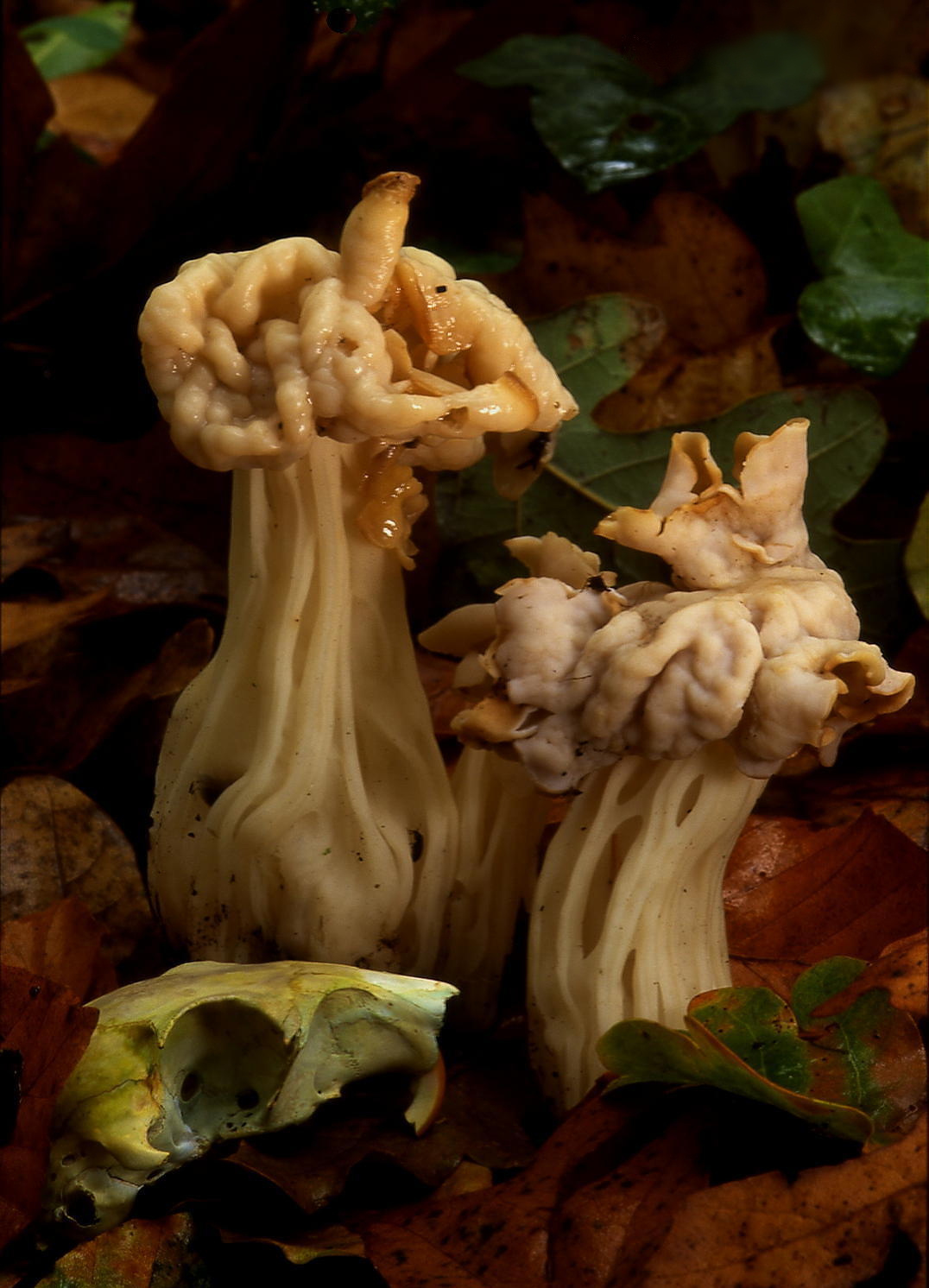
H. crispa in Dorset, England

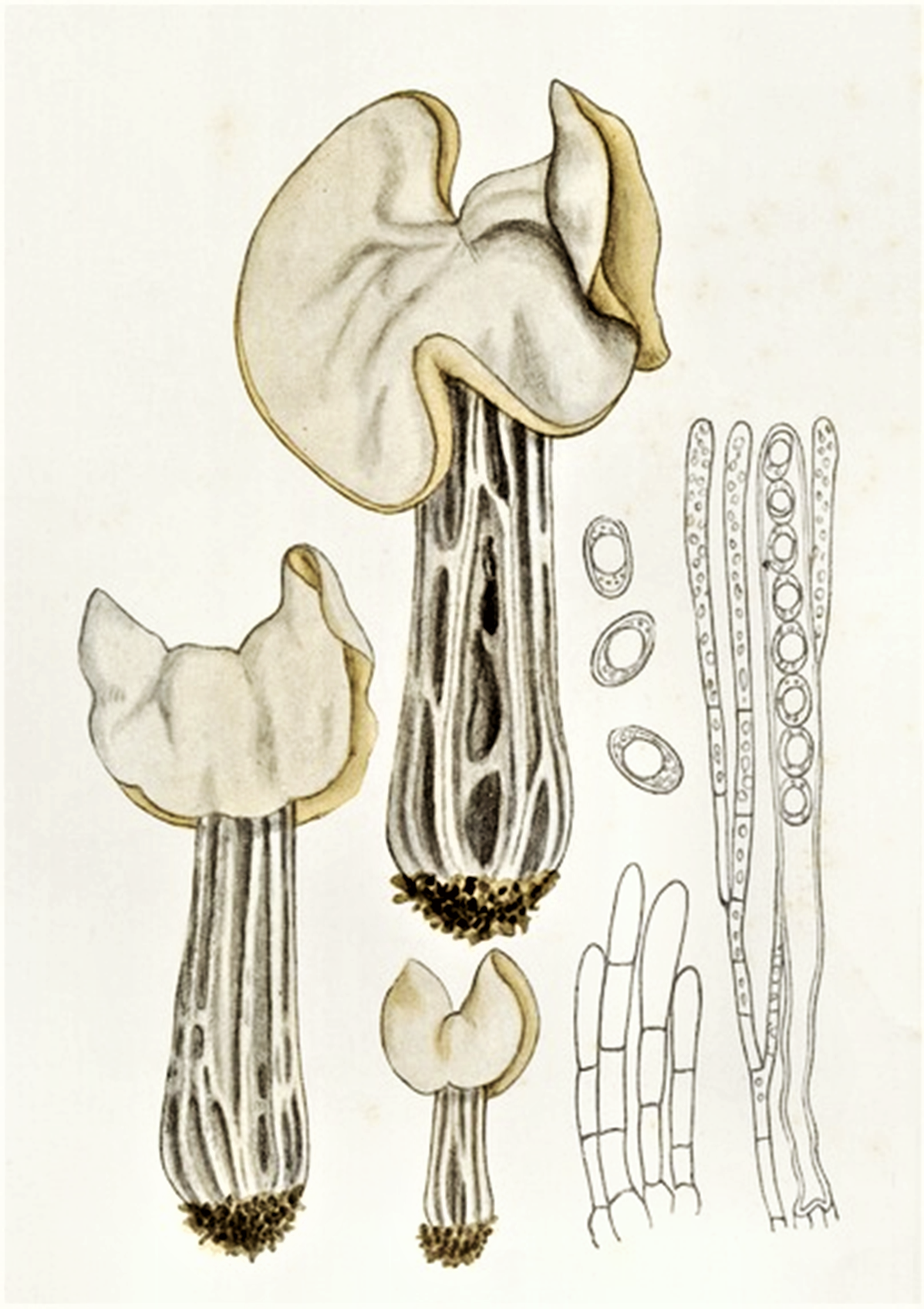
1932 illustration

== Distribution and habitat ==
H. crispa is found in China, Japan, Europe and eastern and western North America, though is sometimes replaced by the related Helvella lacunosa in western parts.

It grows in grass as well as in humid hardwoods, such as beech (not so well in resinous ones), along the side of pathways, in hedges and on the talus of meadows. They can be spotted from the end of summer until the end of autumn.

== Edibility ==
Some guidebooks list this species as edible as recently as 2006. However, it has been reported to cause gastrointestinal symptoms when eaten raw. Many sources list this species as containing or being suspected of containing monomethylhydrazine; extensive chemical analysis has not been performed on this species. Some guides recommend that if consumed, it is recommended to cook thoroughly and only in small amounts, and to consume with caution. There is no evidence of this species being widely consumed, or that toxins are removed during cooking.

Recent evidence suggests that this fungus and similar species containing gyromitrin may cause the fatal disease amyotrophic lateral sclerosis (ALS) after many years or even decades.
