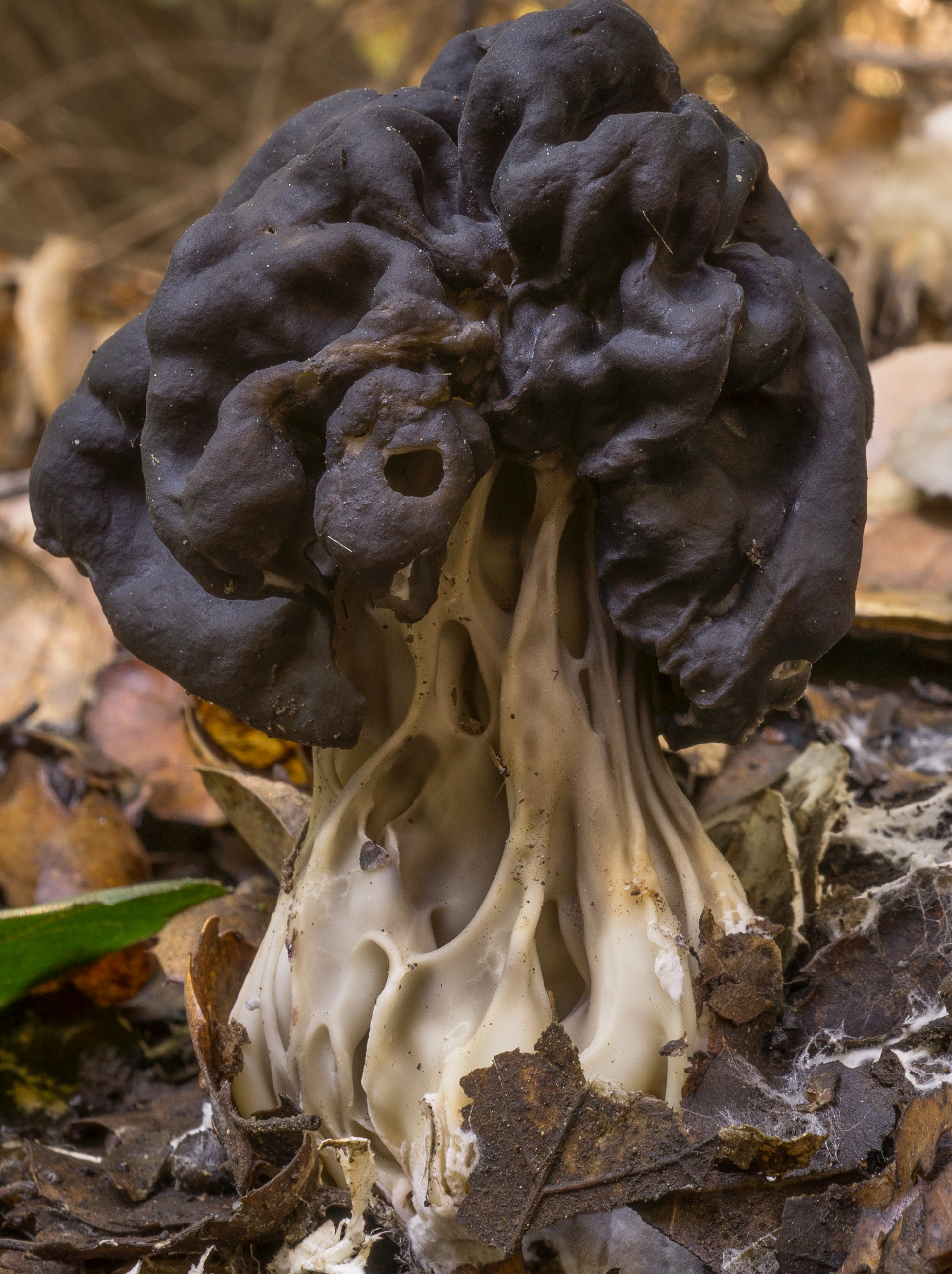

Scientific classification
- Domain: Eukaryota
- Kingdom: Fungi
- Division: Ascomycota
- Class: Pezizomycetes
- Order: Pezizales
- Family: Helvellaceae
- Genus: Helvella
- Species: H. dryophila

Binomial name
- Helvella dryophila Vellinga & N.H.Nguyen (2013)

= Helvella dryophila =

Species of fungus

Helvella dryophila is a species of fungus in the family Helvellaceae. It is found in western North America, where it associates with oak.
