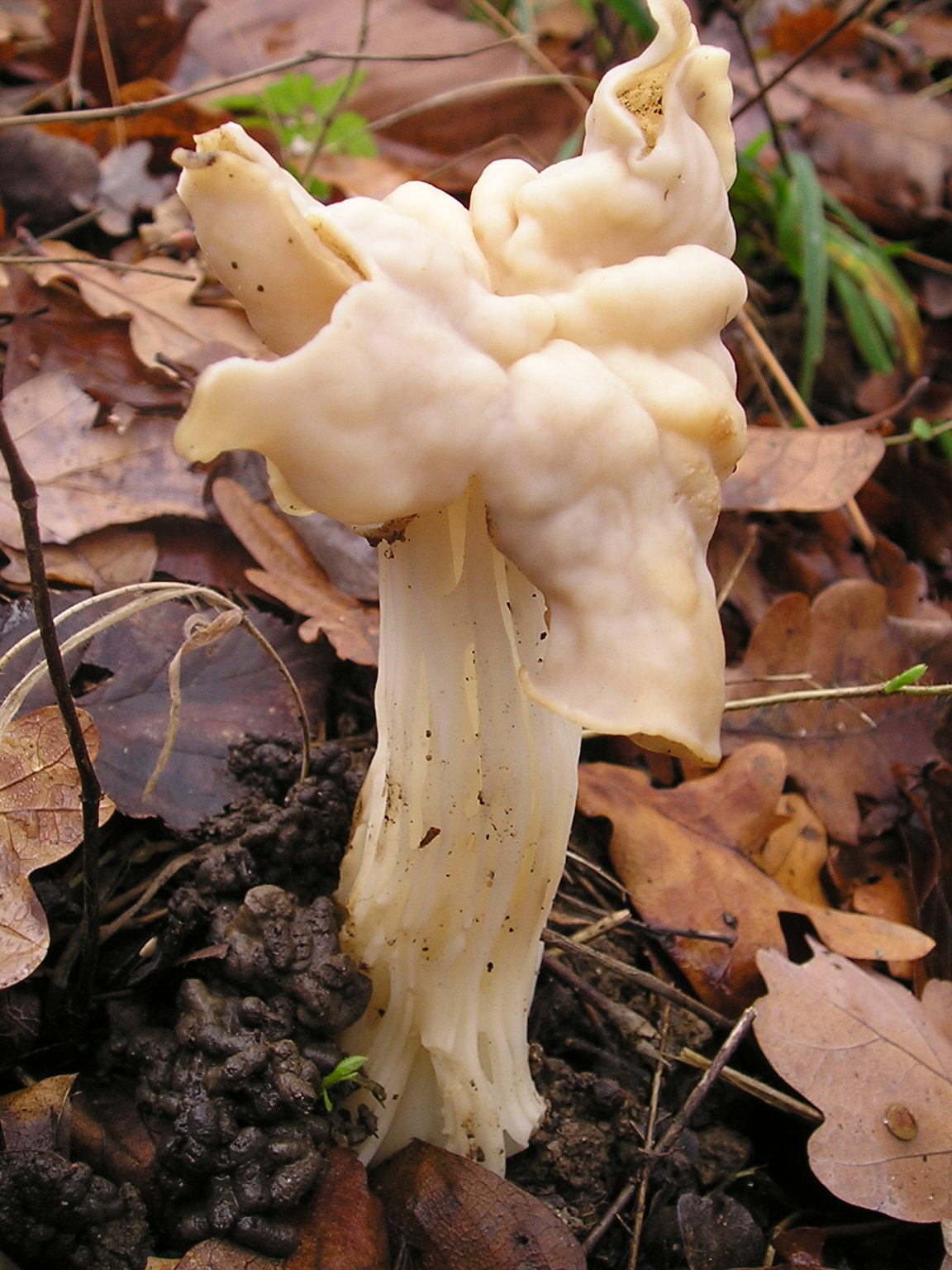
- Helvella crispa

Scientific classification
- Kingdom: Fungi
- Division: Ascomycota
- Class: Pezizomycetes
- Order: Pezizales
- Family: Helvellaceae; Fr. (1822)

Type genus
- Helvella L. (1753)

Genera
- Balsamia; Barssia; Helvella; Underwoodia; Wynnella

= Helvellaceae =

Family of fungi

The Helvellaceae are a family of ascomycete fungi, the best-known members of which are the elfin saddles of the genus Helvella. Originally erected by Elias Magnus Fries in 1823 as Elvellacei, it contained many genera. Several of these, such as Gyromitra and Discina, have been found to be more distantly related in a molecular study of ribosomal DNA by mycologist Kerry O'Donnell in 1997, leaving a much smaller core clade now redefined as Helvellaceae. Instead, this narrowly defined group is most closely related to the true truffles of the Tuberaceae. Although the Dictionary of the Fungi (10th edition, 2008) considered the Helvellaceae to contain six genera and 63 species, genetic analysis has shown that Leucangium, previously classified in this family, is more closely related to the Morchellaceae.
