= Pezizomycetes =

- Clockwise from top left: Morchella esculenta (yellow morel); Sarcoscypha austriaca (scarlet elfcup); Chorioactis geaster (Texas star); Aleuria aurantia (orange peel fungus); Gyromitra esculenta (false morel); Peziza (cup fungi); Helvella vespertina (Western black elfin saddle); and Tuber aestivum (summer truffle)

Scientific classification
- Kingdom: Fungi
- Division: Ascomycota
- Subdivision: Pezizomycotina
- Class: Pezizomycetes; O.E.Eriksson & Winka (1997)

Orders
- Pezizales

Class of fungi

Pezizomycetes are a class of fungi within the division Ascomycota.

Pezizomycetes are apothecial fungi, meaning that their spore-producing/releasing bodies (ascoma) are typically disk-like, bearing on their upper surfaces a layer of cylindrical spore-producing cells called asci, from which the spores are forcibly discharged.

Important groups include: cup fungi (Peziza), morels, Elfin saddles, and truffles.
