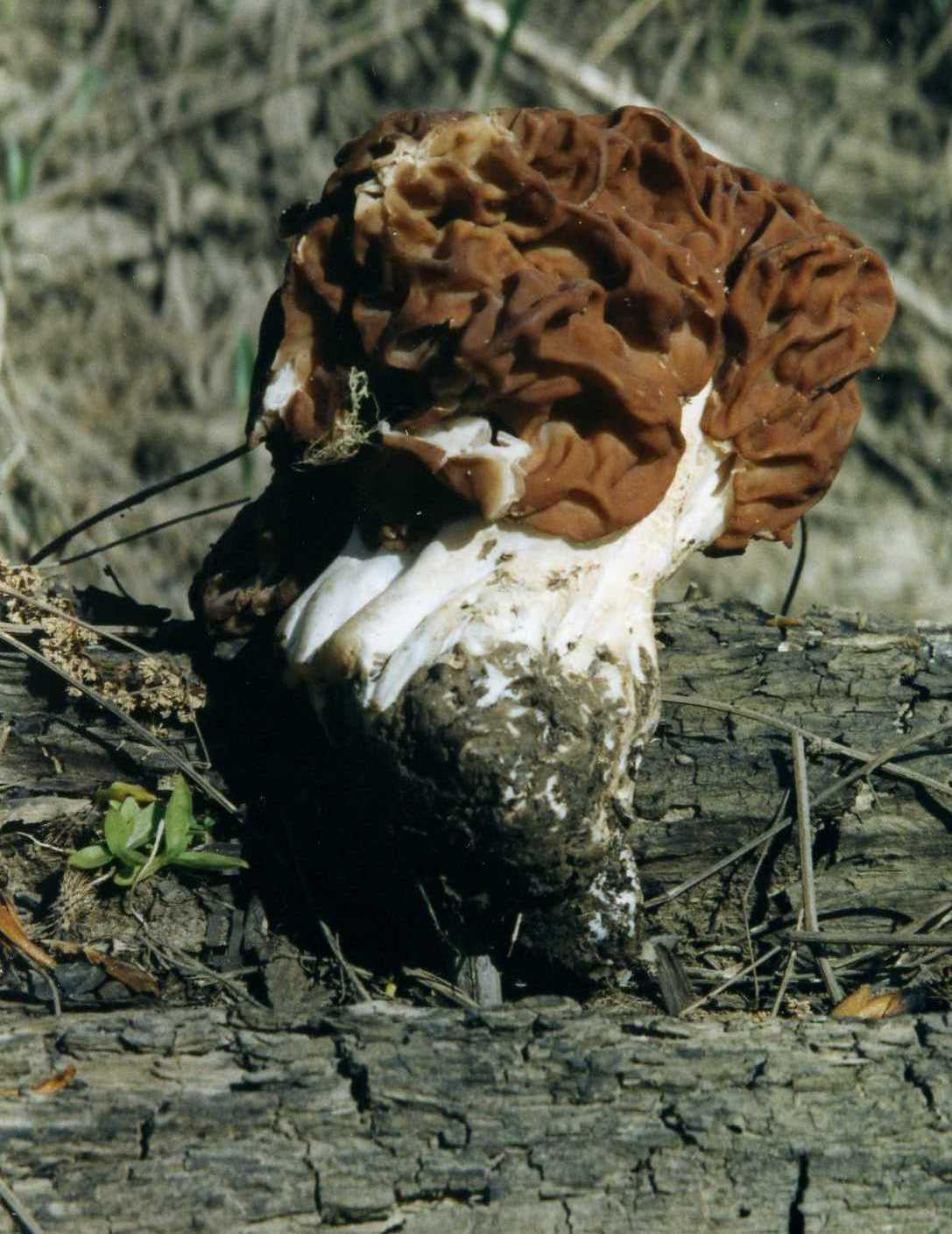

Scientific classification
- Kingdom: Fungi
- Division: Ascomycota
- Class: Pezizomycetes
- Order: Pezizales
- Family: Discinaceae
- Genus: Gyromitra
- Species: G. caroliniana

Binomial name
- Gyromitra caroliniana (Bosc) Fr. (1872)

Synonyms
- Morchella caroliniana Bosc (1811); Helvella caroliniana (Bosc) Nees (1817); Mitrophora caroliniana (Bosc) Lév. (1846); Neogyromitra caroliniana (Bosc) S.Imai (1932); Discina caroliniana (Bosc) Eckblad (1968); Fastigiella caroliniana (Bosc) Benedix (1969)

= Gyromitra caroliniana =

Species of fungus

Gyromitra caroliniana
- Mycological characteristics
- Smooth hymenium
- Cap is convex
- Hymenium attachment is not applicable
- Stipe is bare
- Spore print is yellow
- Ecology is saprotrophic
- Edibility is not recommended

Gyromitra caroliniana, known commonly as the Carolina false morel or big red, is an ascomycete fungus of the genus Gyromitra, within the Pezizales group of fungi. It is found in hardwood forests of the southeastern United States, where it fruits in early spring soon after snowmelt.

The fruit body, or ascocarp, appears on the ground in woodland, and can grow to massive sizes. The heavily wrinkled cap is red-brown in color, nearly spherical to roughly elliptical in shape, and typically measures 15 to 20 cm (5.9 to 7.9 in) tall and 6 to 13 cm (2.4 to 5.1 in) wide. The stipe is massive, up to 11 cm (4.3 in) thick, with a white felt-like surface. The brittle flesh is densely packed into the cap in convoluted folds that form internal locules.

== Taxonomy ==
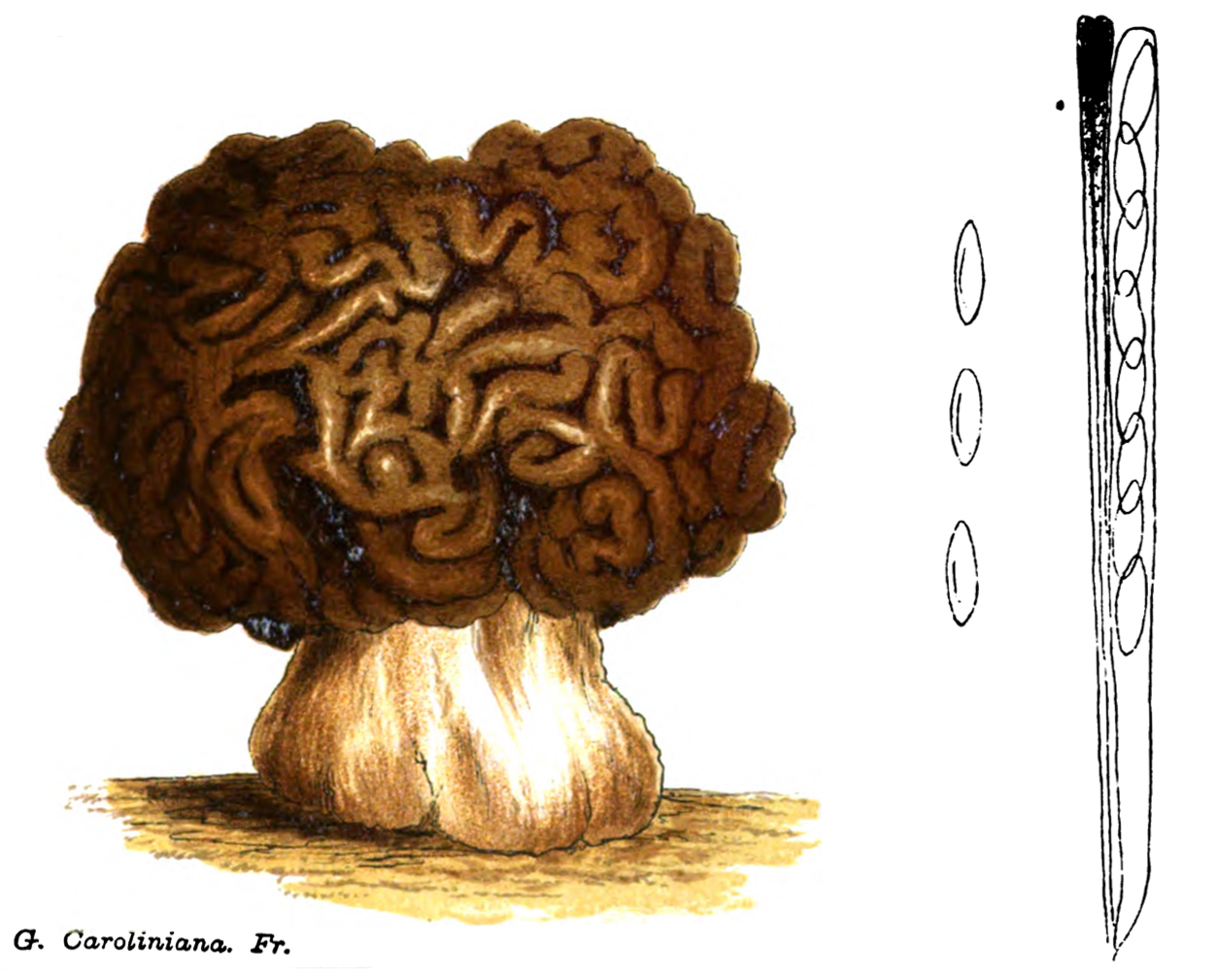
Drawings of fruit body, spores, and ascus with spores from Mordecai Cubitt Cooke's 1879 work Mycographia, seu Icones fungorum

The species was originally named Morchella caroliniana by French botanist Louis Augustin Guillaume Bosc in 1811, and later sanctioned under this name by Elias Fries in 1822. It was transferred to Gyromitra by Fries in 1871. Gyromitra caroliniana is the type species of subgenus Caroliniana of genus Gyromitra. This grouping comprises species that have, in maturity, coarsely reticulate ascospores (i.e., with a network of ridges on the surface) with multiple blunt spines that originate from the reticulum on the spores. Other species in this subgenus include G. fastigiata and the central European species G. parma. In 1969, Erich Heinz Benedix believed that the spore reticulation was sufficiently unique to be worthy of designation as a separate genus, and he described Fastigiella to contain G. caroliniana. Harri Harmaja disagreed, later placing Fastigiella in synonymy with Gyromitra.

In a 2009 review of the genus Gyromitra, authors van Vooren and Moreau say that Bosc's original species description is ambiguous, leaving much room for interpretation, and they suggest that several reports of the species occurring in Europe should be referred to Gyromitra fastigiata. They point out that in 1970, Estonian mycologist Ain Raitviir considered Bosc's Morchella caroliniana a nomen dubium, and Fries's description as nomen confusum, and advocated the abandonment of the specific epithet caroliniana. In the early 1970s, Kent McKnight redefined the taxon and selected a neotype, based on five specimens collected from Lorton, Virginia in 1942.

The specific epithet refers to the Carolinas, where it was first collected scientifically. Common names include the "brown false morel", "Carolina false morel", "big red", (particularly in Missouri and Arkansas), or "river red".

== Description ==
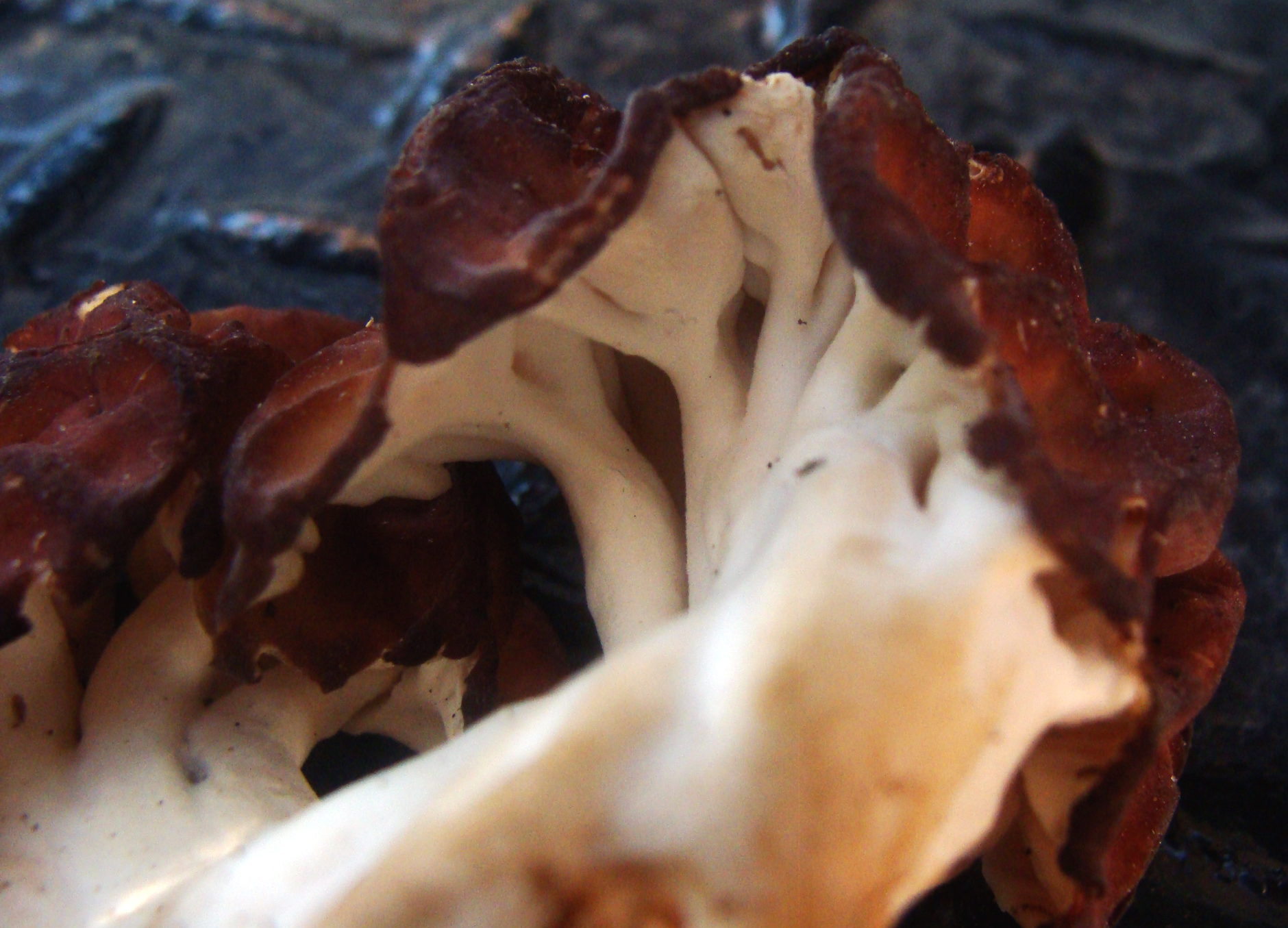
The top of the stipe is branched.

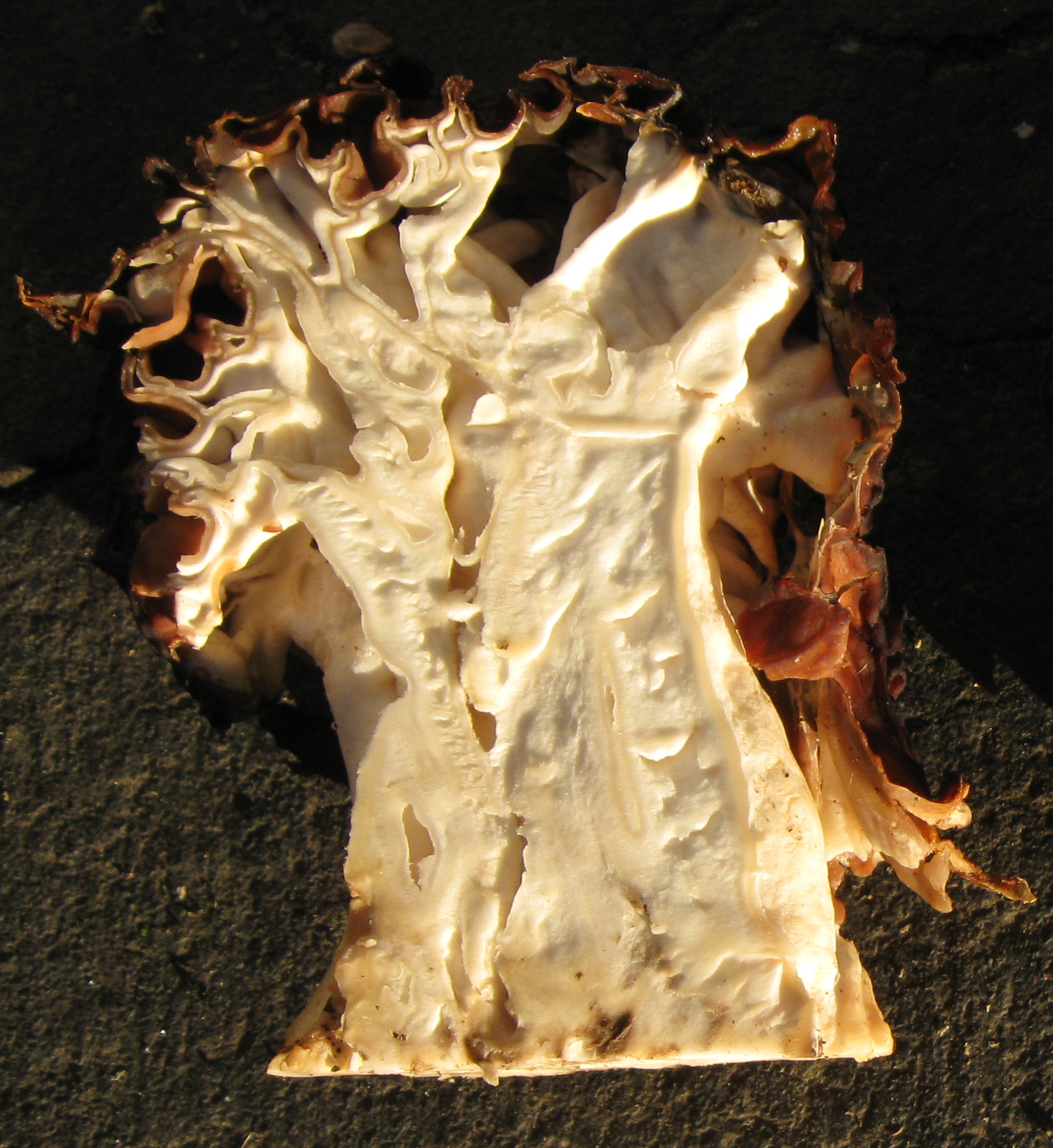
A bisected specimen reveals densely packed flesh and small air pockets.

The cap is roughly spherical to elliptical, and features a folded, crumpled, or corrugated surface that somewhat resembles the surface of a brain. It has areas of more or less symmetrical pits, or ribs arranged vertically. The cap margin is close to the stipe and sometimes adheres to it. The color is reddish to reddish-brown, but becomes darker in weathered specimens; the reverse side is whitish. Fruit bodies are typically 6–7 cm (2.4–2.8 in) across but can grow to be much larger. Fred J. Seaver reported one specimen to have grown to a height of 10.5 in (27 cm), but a more usual height range is 15–20 cm (5.9–7.9 in). The underside is whitish, but not readily visible. The stipe is short and stout, furrowed, typically 6–10 cm (2.4–3.9 in) long by 4–6 cm (1.6–2.4 in) wide but sometimes much larger, and usually thickest at the base. Pure white when young and with a felt-like surface, it discolors in age or with handling. The upper portion of the stipe is usually branched, but the branches are hidden by the cap. The whitish flesh forms locules (chambers) and is densely packed in the stipe and cap, forming branches to the points of attachment.

The spores are narrowly elliptical, hyaline (translucent), and apiculate (with a sharply pointed tip), measuring 30–33 by 11.5–14 μm. Spores usually have one large oil droplet and one or two smaller ones. Initially smooth, the spore surface becomes reticulate and coarse, developing small warts. The use of scanning electron microscopy has revealed up to 6 short apiculi (the part of a spore that attaches to the sterigmata) that originate from extensions of the reticulation. Asci (spore-bearing cells) are 320–420 by 18.5–23 μm, and the paraphyses are 6.5–5.9 μm wide.

Although some guides indicate the species is edible with suitable preparation (such as boiling), it is generally not recommended for consumption because of the risk of confusion with other toxic Gyromitra species that contain the compound gyromitrin. When boiled in water, or digested in the body, this compound is readily hydrolyzed to the toxic compound monomethylhydrazine—used as a propellant in some rocket fuels.

=== Similar species ===
Gyromitra brunnea is similar in appearance to G. caroliana, and has an overlapping geographical range. G. brunnea is distinctly lobed, and lacks ribs and cross-ribs. Consequently, "seams" can usually be found where the undersurface is exposed. In contrast, G. caroliniana is almost never lobed and thus lacks seams. Its tightly wrinkled and attached cap mostly hide the undersurface. G. korfii has a more block-like or square appearance, and its yellowish-brown to reddish-brown cap surface has fewer wrinkles, folds, and convolutions. G. fastigiata is a European species that resembles the North American G. brunnea. The common and widespread G. esculenta has a loosely lobed, irregularly shaped, brainlike cap. It has shorter spores measuring 21–25 by 12–13 μm.

Gyromitra lookalikes
G. fastigiata	G. korfii	G. brunnea	G. esculenta

== Habitat and distribution ==
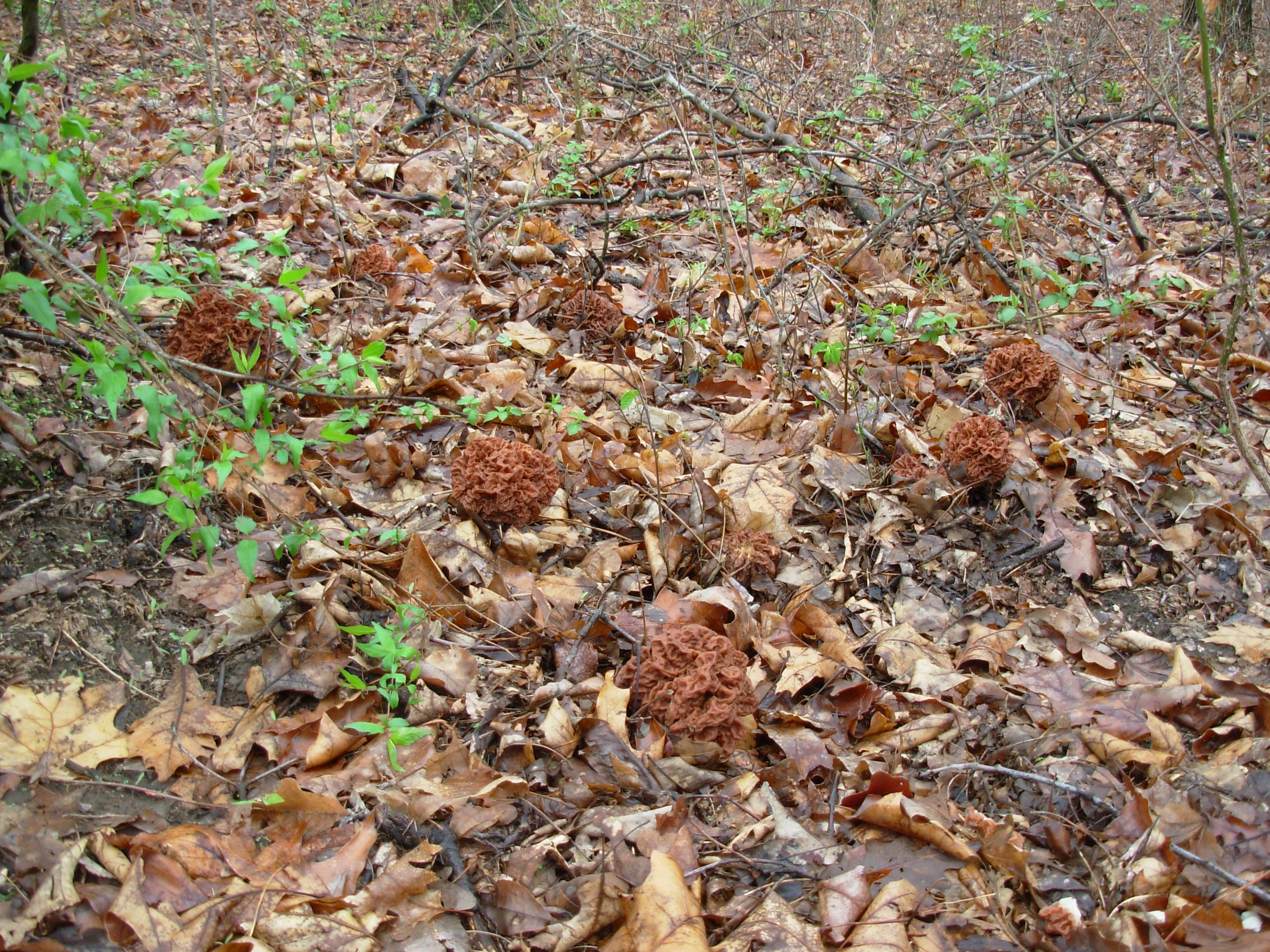
Fruit bodies can grow singly or in loose groups.

The fungus fruits singly or in loose groups on the ground under hardwood trees, in rich humus. Common habitats include near stumps and other dead wood, particularly oak, and along river bottoms. In the southern states, it can appear as early as March, but elsewhere it typically fruits in April and May. The species has been used as an indicator signalling the start of "morel season". Gyromitra species are "officially" considered saprobic, but exhibit some mycorrhizal tendencies, and may integrate both ecological lifestyles in their life cycle.

The range of G. caroliniana includes Oklahoma to the Carolinas and north to the Great Lakes. Erich Benedix reported the fungus in Thuringia and Austria, where he claimed it had previously often been misidentified with young forms of Gyromitra infula. A more recent revision disputes those claims, saying "Reports from Europe are unsubstantiated and are due to confusion with G. fastigiata and G. gigas". The fruit bodies develop slowly, and specimens left until late in the season can grow up to five pounds or more.

== See also ==
- Morchella, the true morels
