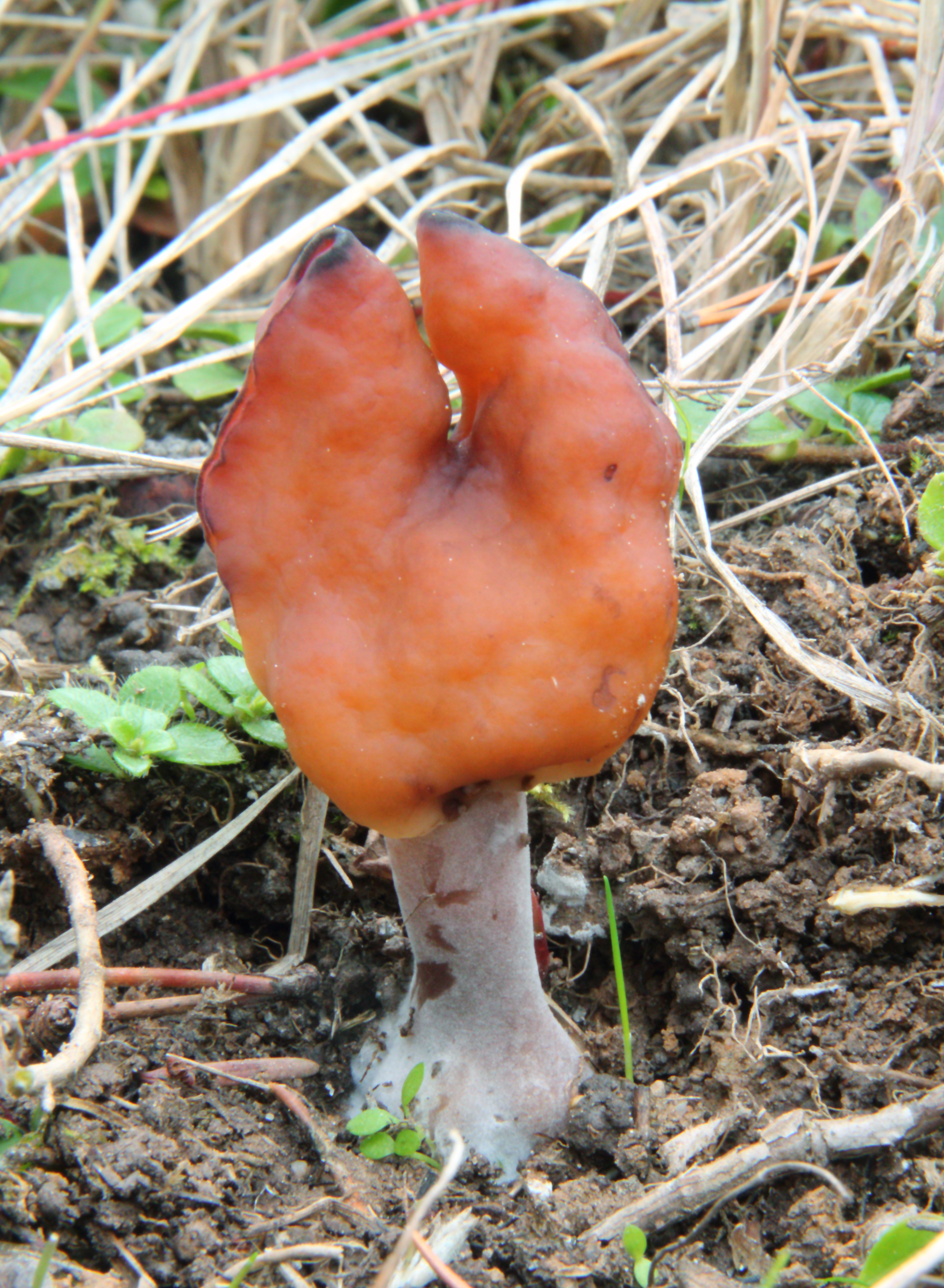

Scientific classification
- Domain: Eukaryota
- Kingdom: Fungi
- Division: Ascomycota
- Class: Pezizomycetes
- Order: Pezizales
- Family: Discinaceae
- Genus: Paragyromitra
- Species: P. infula

Binomial name
- Paragyromitra infula (Schaeff.) X.C. Wang & W.Y. Zhuang (2023)

Synonyms
- List: Helvella infula Schaeff. (1774); Helvella brunnea J.F.Gmel. (1792); Gyromitra infula (Schaeff.) Quél. (1886); Physomitra infula (Schaeff.) Boud. (1907)

= Paragyromitra infula =

Species of fungus

Paragyromitra infula Mycological characteristics
- Smooth hymenium
- Cap is convex
- Hymenium attachment is not applicable
- Stipe is bare
- Spore print is yellow to buff
- Ecology is saprotrophic or mycorrhizal
- Edibility is poisonous

Paragyromitra infula, commonly known as the hooded false morel or the elfin saddle, is a species of fungus in the family Discinaceae. The dark reddish-brown caps of the fruit bodies develop a characteristic saddle-shape in maturity, and the ends of both saddle lobes are drawn out to sharp tips that project above the level of the fruit body. The stipe is white or flushed pale brown, smooth on the outside, but hollow with some chambers inside.

P. infula is found in the Northern Hemisphere, usually in the late summer and autumn, growing on rotting wood or on hard packed ground. The species has been considered poisonous, believed to contain the toxic compound gyromitrin, but a 2023 study has thrown this into doubt.

== Taxonomy ==
The fungus was first described in 1774 by the German mycologist Jacob Christian Schäffer as Helvella infula (the original genus spelling was Elvela). In 1849, Elias Magnus Fries established the genus Gyromitra, distinguishing it from Helvella based on a gyrose hymenium (marked with wavy lines or convolutions); the genus was based on the type species G. esculenta. Later, in 1886, the French mycologist Lucien Quélet transferred the species to Gyromitra. The next few decades witnessed some lingering confusion as to the correct taxonomical placement of these fungi.

In 1907, Jean Boudier moved both G. esculenta and H. infula into a newly created genus he called Physomitra; he retained the genus Gyromitra but "based it on an entirely different character so as to exclude from the genus the very species on which it was founded". In an attempt to reconcile the confusion surrounding the naming and identity of the two mushrooms, Fred J. Seaver proposed that both were synonymous, representing variable forms of the same species. His suggestion was not adopted by later mycologists, who identified various differences between the two species, including fruiting time as well as macroscopic and microscopic differences. The species is now classified in the newly erected genus Paragyromitra.

=== Etymology ===
The specific epithet is from the Latin infǔla, a heavy band of twisted wool worn by Roman officiants at sacrifices. It is known more commonly as the elfin saddle or the hooded false morel. Additionally, P. infula is a member of a group of fungi collectively known as "false morels", so named for their resemblance to the highly regarded edible true morels of the genus Morchella. This group includes species such as Gyromitra esculenta (brain mushroom), Discina caroliniana (beefsteak mushroom) and Discina gigas (snow morel).

== Description ==
The cap of the fruit body (technically an apothecium) is about 2.5–9 cm (1–3 1/2 in) wide and tall, reddish to orangish brown, and saddle-shaped with 2–4 lobes. It is chambered or hollow within and frequently develops blackish-brown spots on the surface. During the mushroom's development, the cap's periphery grows into the stipe below to form a hollow, roughly bell-shaped structure with the fertile spore-bearing surface (the hymenium) on the outside; as the surface growth of the hymenium continues to expand even after joining to the stipe, the hymenium can no longer follow and it arches up into folds and pads.

The mostly hollow stipe is between 2–8 cm (3/4–3 1/8 in) high and 1–2.5 cm (3/8–1 in) thick, varying in color from reddish brown to whitish or even bluish, but is typically lighter than the cap. The stipe is minutely tomentose – covered with a layer of very fine hairs. The context (flesh) is 1–2 millimetres thick, brittle, and whitish to brownish. It lacks a notable odor or taste.

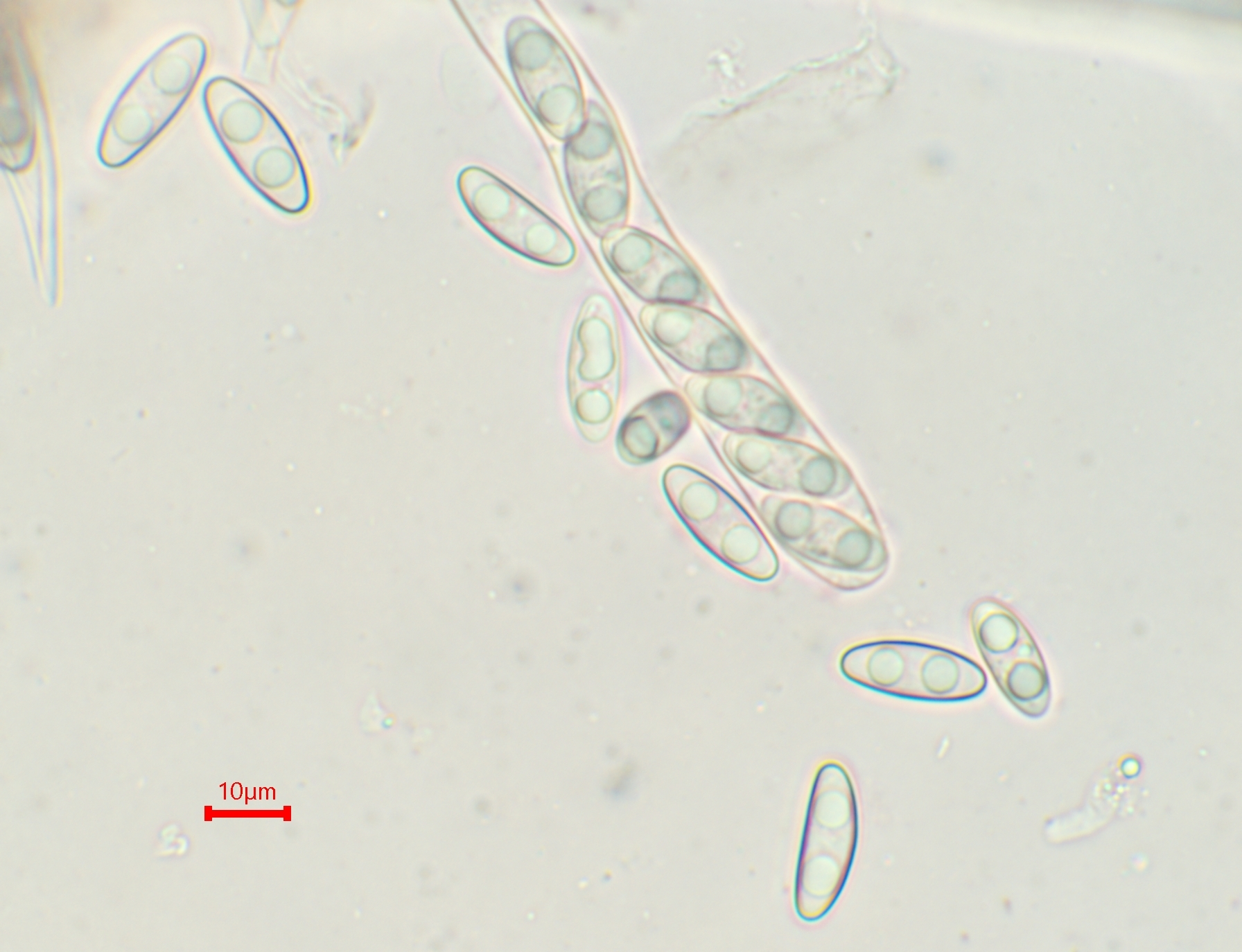
Spores and ascus

Ascospores are ellipsoidal in shape, hyaline, smooth, thin-walled, with dimensions of 17–22 by 7–9 μm. They are also biguttulate, containing two large oil droplets at either end. The spore-producing cells, the asci, are roughly cylindrical, eight-spored, operculate (opening by an apical lid to discharge the spores) and have dimensions of 200–350 by 12–17 |μm. The diameter of the club-shaped paraphyses is 7–10 μm at the apex.

=== Similar species ===
Gyromitra esculenta has a wrinkled surface (similar to brainlike convolutions), not wavy or bumpy like P. infula. Paragyromitra ambigua is very similar in appearance, and although it is usually not possible to discern between the two species without examining microscopic characteristics, P. ambigua is said to have more pronounced purple tints in the stipe and has larger spores (about 22–30 μm long). Discina brunnea is more stout with a white stem, with a wrinkled cap which usually lacks points.

The saddle-shaped cap of P. infula might also lead to confusion with some species of the genus Helvella, but these latter fungi typically have grayer colors and thinner, fluted stipes (e.g. H. maculata which has distinctly white flesh).

== Distribution and habitat ==
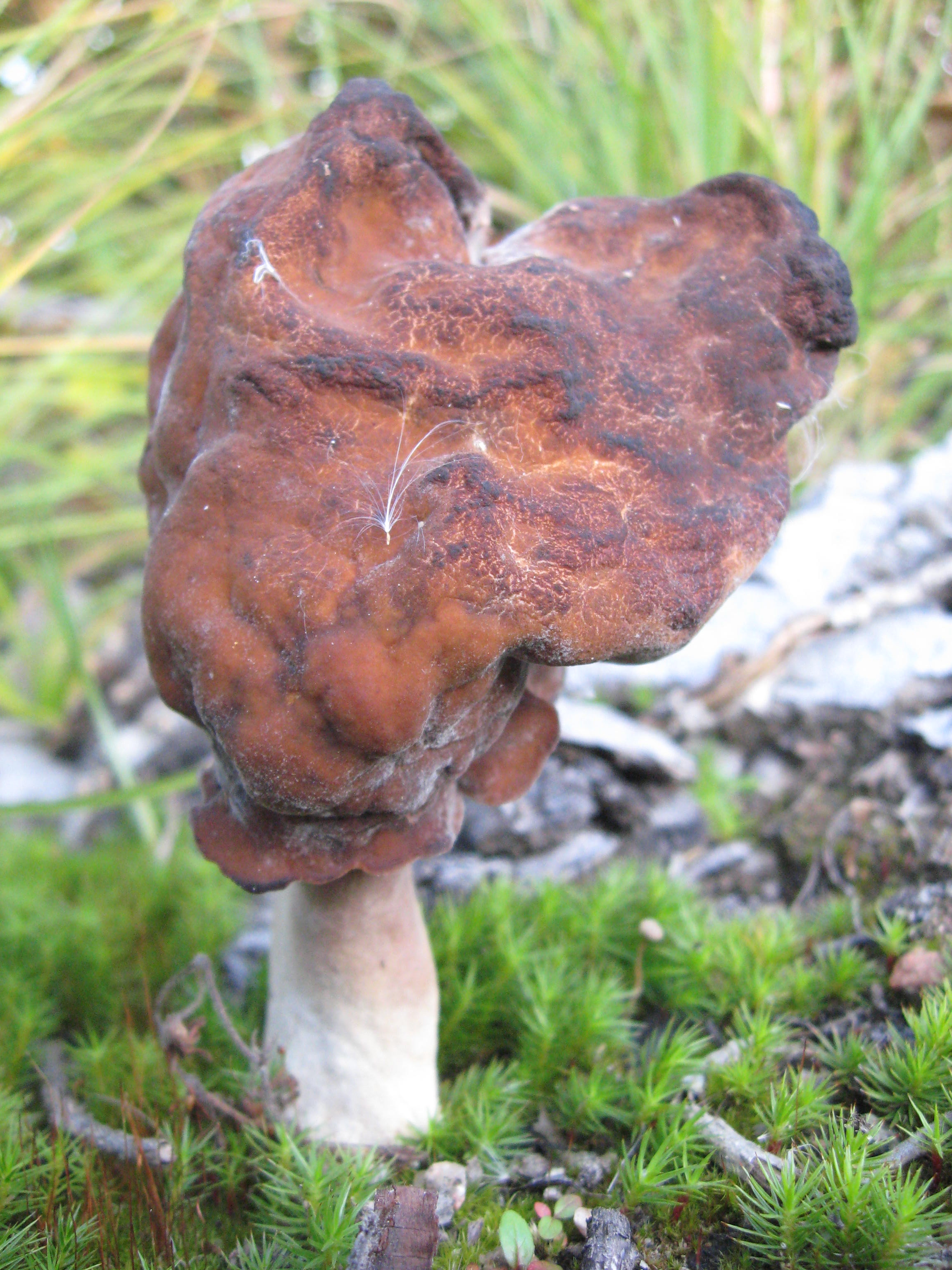
P. infula in northern Saskatchewan

P. infula is widely distributed throughout boreal, montane and coastal forests in North America. The North American range extends north to Canada and south to Mexico. It has also been reported from South America, Europe, and Asia.

The fungus can be found growing singly to scattered in or near coniferous woodland in autumn, often on rotten wood. It is also commonly found on packed ground, such as beside country roads, or in campgrounds. Associated conifers include Picea glauca, P. mariana, P. sitchensis, Pinus contorta, P. banksiana, P. monticola, Abies balsamea, A. grandis, Pseudotsuga menziesii, Tsuga heterophylla, Larix occidentalis, Thuja plicata, as well as the deciduous tree species Populus balsamifera, P. tremuloides, Acer macrophyllum, Alnus species, and Betula papyrifera.

== Toxicity ==
This fungus has been widely regarded as poisonous, as it was long believed to contain the toxic compound gyromitrin, present in some species of Gyromitra, which when digested is metabolized into monomethylhydrazine, a major component of rocket fuel. However, a 2023 study found no traces of gyromitrin in G. infula (now called Paragyromitra infula) using a new chromatography method.
