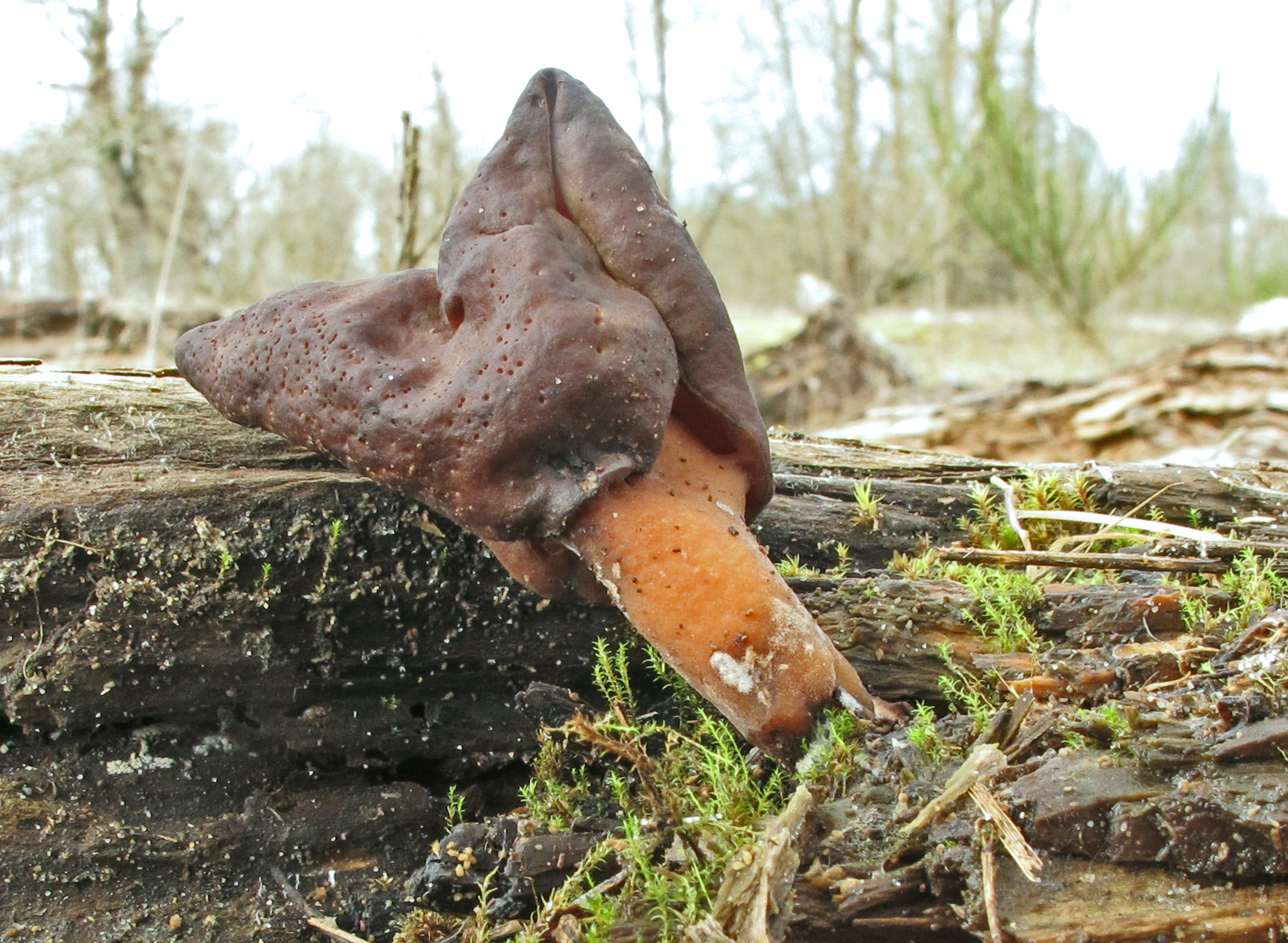
- On Sauvie Island, Oregon

Scientific classification
- Domain: Eukaryota
- Kingdom: Fungi
- Division: Ascomycota
- Class: Pezizomycetes
- Order: Pezizales
- Family: Discinaceae
- Genus: Paragyromitra
- Species: P. ambigua

Binomial name
- Paragyromitra ambigua (P.Karst.) X.C. Wang & W.Y. Zhuang (2023)

Synonyms
- Helvella ambigua P.Karst. (1881); Physomitra infula var. ambigua (P.Karst.) Boud. (1907); Gyromitra ambigua (P. Karst.) Harmaja (1969)

= Paragyromitra ambigua =

Species of fungus

Paragyromitra ambigua is an ascomycete species of fungus in the family Discinaceae, and related to the false morel G. esculenta. The species is found in North America, where it produces fruit bodies (mushrooms) that grow on the ground. The edibility of the fruit bodies is not known with certainty, and it is not recommended for consumption.

== See also ==
- Gyromitrin, a toxic chemical found in Gyromitra fungi
- Morchella, the true morels
