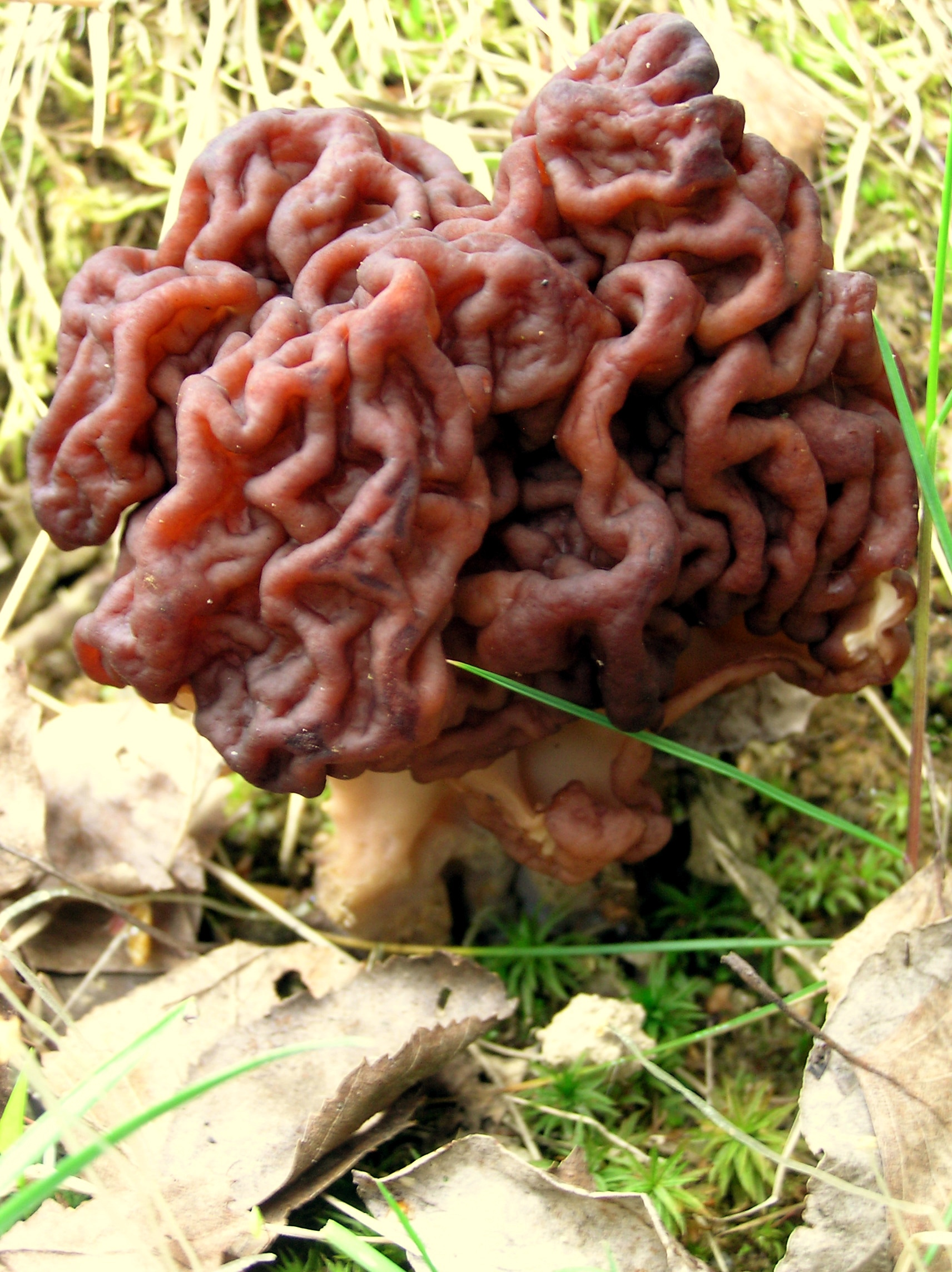

Scientific classification
- Kingdom: Fungi
- Division: Ascomycota
- Class: Pezizomycetes
- Order: Pezizales
- Family: Discinaceae
- Genus: Gyromitra
- Species: G. esculenta

Binomial name
- Gyromitra esculenta (Pers. ex Pers.) Fr. (1849)

Synonyms
- Helvella esculenta Pers. (1800); Physomitra esculenta (Pers.) Boud. (1907)

= Gyromitra esculenta =

Species of fungus

Gyromitra esculenta
- Mycological characteristics
- Smooth hymenium
- Cap is convex
- Hymenium attachment is not applicable
- Stipe is bare
- Spore print is yellow to buff
- Ecology is saprotrophic or mycorrhizal
- Edibility is deadly or choice

Gyromitra esculenta /ˌdʒaɪroʊˈmaɪtrə ˌɛskjəˈlɛntə, ˌdʒɪrə-/ is an ascomycete fungus from the genus Gyromitra. The fruiting body, or mushroom, is an irregular brain-shaped cap, dark brown in colour, that can reach 10 centimetres (4 inches) high and 15 cm (6 in) wide, perched on a stout white stipe up to 6 cm (2 1/2 in) high. It is widely distributed across Europe and North America, normally fruiting in sandy soils under coniferous trees in spring and early summer.

Although potentially fatal if eaten raw, G. esculenta is sometimes parboiled for consumption, being a popular delicacy in Europe and the upper Great Lakes region of North America. However, evidence suggests that thorough cooking does not eliminate all toxins. When consumed, the principal active mycotoxin, gyromitrin, is hydrolyzed into the toxic compound monomethylhydrazine, which affects the liver, central nervous system, and sometimes the kidneys. Symptoms involve vomiting and diarrhea several hours after consumption, followed by dizziness, lethargy and headache. Severe cases may lead to delirium, coma, and death. Recent evidence suggests G. esculenta may be chronically toxic and linked to regional clusters of ALS.

== Taxonomy ==
The fungus was first described in 1800, by mycologist Christian Hendrik Persoon, as Helvella esculenta, and gained its current accepted binomial name when the Swedish mycologist Elias Magnus Fries placed it in the genus Gyromitra in 1849.

It is known by a variety of common descriptive names such as "brain mushroom", "turban fungus", elephant ears, or "beefsteak mushroom/morel", although beefsteak mushroom can also refer to the much choicer edible basidiomycete Fistulina hepatica. Dating from the 19th century, the German term lorchel is a result of the older lorche, itself from the 18th century Low German Lorken, aligning with the similar-sounding (and similar-looking) morchel.

Gyromitra esculenta is a member of a group of fungi known as "false morels", so named for their resemblance to the highly regarded true morels of the genus Morchella. The grouping includes other species of the genus Gyromitra, such as G. infula (elfin saddle), G. caroliniana and G. gigas (snow morel). While some of these species contain little to no gyromitrin, many guidebooks recommend treating them all as poisonous, since their similar appearance and significant intraspecific variation can make reliable identification difficult. The toxic qualities of G. esculenta may be reduced by cooking, but possibly not enough to prevent poisoning from repeated consumption.

The more distantly related ascomycete mushrooms of the genus Verpa, such as V. bohemica and V. conica, are also known as false morels, early morels or thimble morels; like the Gyromitra, they are eaten by some and considered poisonous by others.

The genus Gyromitra had been classically considered part of the family Helvellaceae, along with the similar-looking elfin saddles of the genus Helvella. Analysis of the ribosomal DNA of many of the Pezizales showed G. esculenta and the other false morels to be only distantly related to the other members of the Helvellaceae and instead most closely related to the genus Discina, forming a clade which also contains Pseudorhizina and Hydnotrya. Thus the four genera are now included in the family Discinaceae.

=== Etymology ===
The genus name is derived from the Greek terms gyros/γυρος "round" and mitra/μιτρα "headband". Its specific epithet is derived from the Latin esculentus, "edible".

== Description ==
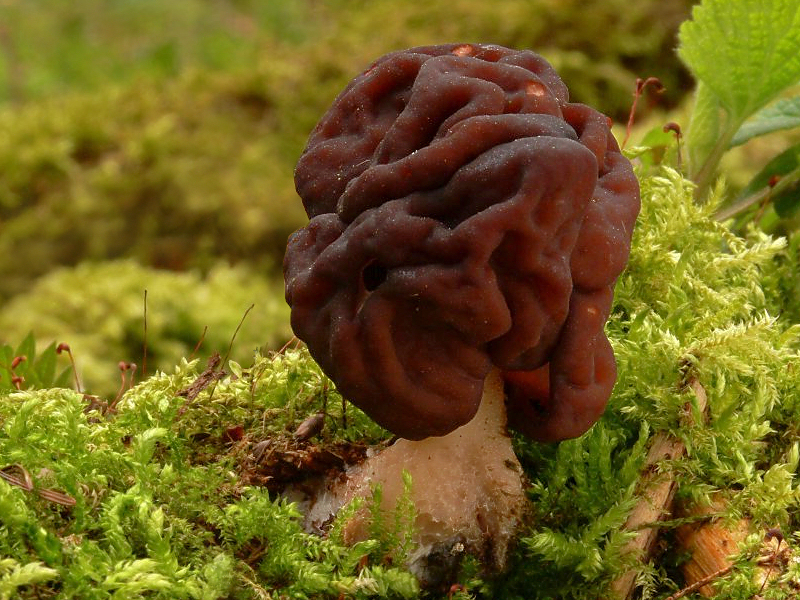
A younger specimen with a less wrinkled cap

Resembling a brain, the irregularly shaped cap may be 12 centimetres (4 1/2 inches) or more high and wide. Initially smooth, it becomes progressively more wrinkled as it grows and ages. The cap is brownish, and can variously be shaded reddish, chestnut, purplish, or golden. It darkens to black in age. Specimens from California may have more reddish-brown caps. Attached to the cap at several points, the stipe is 3–6 cm (1–2 1/2 in) high and 1–5 cm (1/2–2 in) wide. G. esculenta has been reported to have a solid stipe whereas those of true morels (Morchella spp.) are hollow, although a modern source says it is hollow as well. The smell can be pleasant and has been described as fruity, and the fungus is mild-tasting.

The spore print is whitish, with transparent spores that are elliptical and 17–22 μm in length.

=== Similar species ===
G. esculenta resembles the various species of true morel, although the latter are more symmetric and look more like pitted gray, tan, or brown sponges. Its cap is generally darker and larger.

G. gigas, G. infula and G. ambigua in particular are similar, the latter two being toxic to humans.

== Habitat and distribution ==
G. esculenta grows on sandy soil in temperate coniferous forest and occasionally in deciduous woodlands. Among conifers it is mostly found under pines (Pinus spp.), but also sometimes under aspens (Populus spp.). The hunting period is from April to July, earlier than for other species, and the fungus may even sprout up with the melting snow. It can be abundant in some years and rare in others. The mushroom is more commonly found in places where ground has been disturbed, such as openings, rivulets, washes, timber clearings, plowed openings, forest fire clearings, and roadsides. Enthusiasts in Finland have been reported burying newspaper inoculated with the fungus in the ground in autumn and returning the following spring to collect mushrooms.

Although more abundant in montane and northern coniferous woodlands such as the Sierra Nevada and the Cascade Range in northwestern North America, Gyromitra esculenta is found widely across the continent, as far south as Mexico. It is also common in Central Europe, less abundant in the east, and more in montane areas than lowlands. It has been recorded from Northern Ireland, from Uşak Province in Western Turkey, and from the vicinity of Kaş in the Antalya Province of Turkey's southern coast.

== Toxicity ==
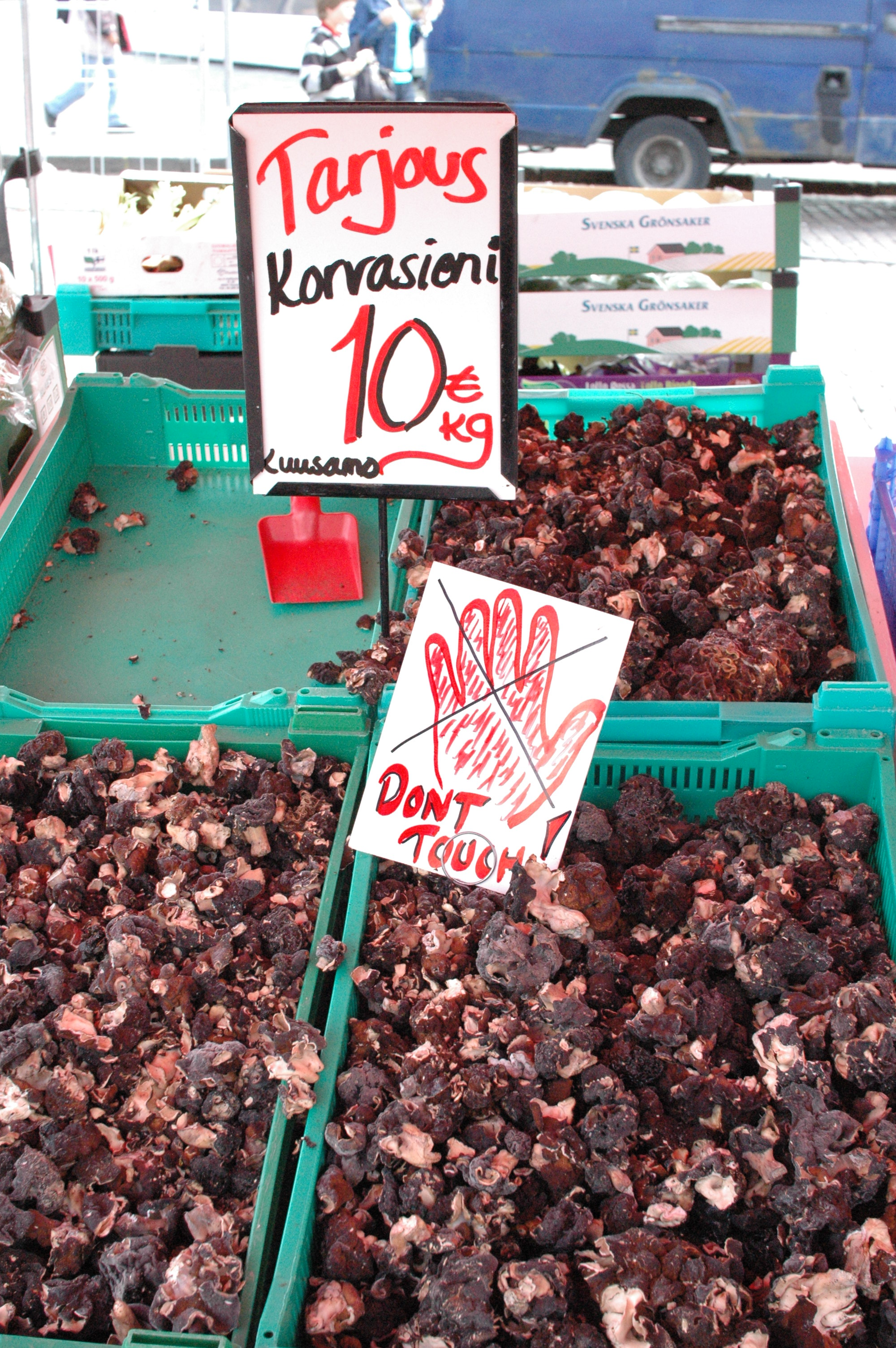
For sale with warning sign, Market Square, Helsinki

Toxic reactions have been known for at least a hundred years. Experts speculated the reaction was more of an allergic one specific to the consumer, or a misidentification, rather than innate toxicity of the fungus, due to the wide range in effects seen. Some would suffer severely or perish while others exhibited no symptoms after eating similar amounts of mushrooms from the same dish. Yet others would be not poisoned after eating G. esculenta for many years. However, the fungus is now widely recognized as potentially deadly. The mushroom has been linked to ALS in a French study, potentially causing clusters of sporadic etiology cases of the neurodegenerative disease. The toxin gyromitrin is metabolized to monomethylhydrazine a carcinogen and potential cause of sporadic ALS. A similar toxin was found in a diet the Chamorro people of Micronesia, where the sporadic ALS cluster or Lytico-bodig disease was linked to consumption of bats eating Federico nuts (Cycas micronesica) and of flour made from these nuts.

Gyromitra esculenta contains levels of the poison gyromitrin that vary locally among populations; although these mushrooms are only rarely involved in poisonings in either North America or western Europe, intoxications are seen frequently in eastern Europe and Scandinavia. A 1971 Polish study reported at the time that the species accounted for up to 23% of mushroom fatalities each year. Death rates have dropped since the mid-twentieth century; in Sweden poisoning is common, though life-threatening poisonings have not been detected and there was no fatality reported over the 50 years from 1952 to 2002. Gyromitra poisonings are rare in Spain, due to the widespread practice of drying the mushrooms before preparation and consumption, but has a mortality rate of about 25%.

A lethal dose of gyromitrin has been estimated to be 10–30 mg/kg for children and 20–50 mg/kg in adults. These doses correspond to around 0.2–0.6 kg (7 oz – 1 lb 5 oz) and 0.4–1 kg (14 oz – 2 lb 3 oz) of fresh mushroom respectively. Evidence suggests that children are more severely affected; it is unclear whether this is due to a larger weight consumed per body mass ratio or to differences in enzyme and metabolic activity.

=== Geographical variation ===
Populations of G. esculenta appear to vary geographically in their toxicity. A French study has shown that mushrooms collected at higher altitudes have lower concentrations of toxin than those from lower elevations, and there is some evidence that fungi west of the Rocky Mountains in North America contain less toxin than those to the east. However, poisonings in the USA have been reported, although less frequently than in Europe.

=== Biochemistry ===
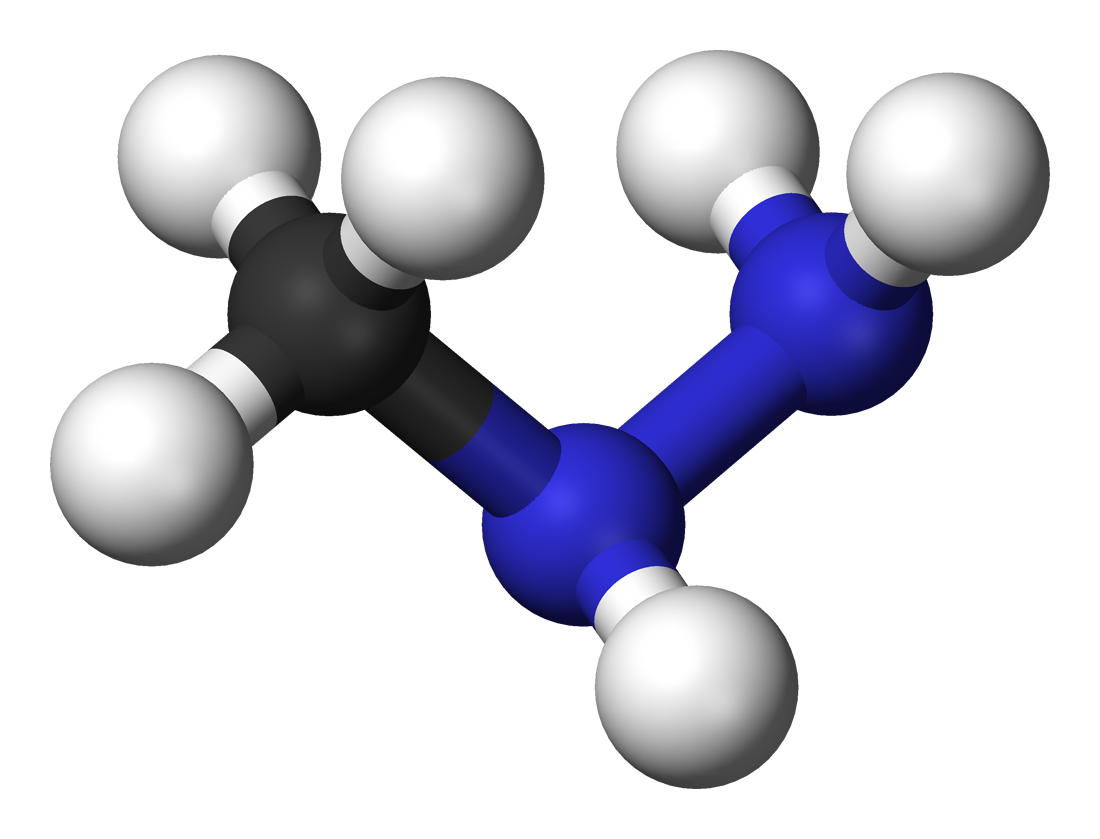
MMH (C H_{3}N_{2}H_{3}), a toxic metabolite

The identity of the toxic constituents eluded researchers until 1968, when acetaldehyde N-methyl-N-formylhydrazone, better known as gyromitrin, was isolated. Gyromitrin is a volatile, water-soluble hydrazine compound hydrolyzed in the body into N-methyl-N-formylhydrazine (MFH) then monomethylhydrazine (MMH). Other N-methyl-N-formylhydrazone derivatives have been isolated in subsequent research, although they are present in smaller amounts. These other compounds would also produce monomethylhydrazine when hydrolyzed, although it remains unclear how much each contributes to the false morel's toxicity.

MMH reacts with pyridoxal-5-phosphate—the activated form of pyridoxine (vitamin B_{6})—to form a hydrazone. This reduces production of the neurotransmitter GABA via decreased activity of glutamic acid decarboxylase, producing the neurological symptoms. MMH also causes oxidative stress leading to methemoglobinemia. Inhibition of diamine oxidase (histaminase) elevates histamine levels resulting in headaches, nausea, vomiting, and abdominal pain.

MFH, the intermediary product of gyromitrin hydrolysis, has toxicities of its own. MFH undergoes cytochrome P450-regulated oxidative metabolism which, via reactive nitrosamide intermediates, leads to formation of methyl radicals which lead to liver damage.

=== Symptoms ===
The symptoms of poisoning are typically gastrointestinal and neurological. Symptoms occur within 6–12 hours of consumption, although cases of more severe poisoning may present sooner—as little as 2 hours after ingestion. Initial symptoms are gastrointestinal, with sudden onset of nausea, vomiting, and watery diarrhea which may be bloodstained. Dehydration may develop if the vomiting or diarrhea is severe. Dizziness, lethargy, vertigo, tremor, ataxia, nystagmus, and headaches develop soon after; fever often occurs, a distinctive feature which does not develop after poisoning by other types of mushrooms. In most cases of poisoning, symptoms do not progress from these initial symptoms, and patients recover after 2–6 days of illness.

In some cases there may be an asymptomatic phase following the initial symptoms which is then followed by more significant toxicity including kidney damage, liver damage, and neurological dysfunction including seizures and coma. These signs usually develop within 1–3 days in serious cases. The patient develops jaundice and the liver and spleen become enlarged; in some cases blood sugar levels will rise (hyperglycemia) and then fall (hypoglycemia) and liver toxicity is seen. Additionally intravascular hemolysis causes destruction of red blood cells resulting in increase in free hemoglobin and hemoglobinuria which can lead to renal toxicity or kidney failure. Methemoglobinemia may also occur in some cases. This is where higher than normal levels of methemoglobin, which is a form of hemoglobin that can not carry oxygen, are found in the blood. It causes the patient to become short of breath and cyanotic. Cases of severe poisoning may progress to a terminal neurological phase, with delirium, muscle fasciculations and seizures, and mydriasis progressing to coma, circulatory collapse, and respiratory arrest. Death may occur from five to seven days after consumption.

=== Treatment ===
Treatment is mainly supportive; gastric decontamination with activated charcoal may be beneficial if medical attention is sought within a few hours of consumption. However, symptoms often take longer than this to develop, and patients do not usually present for treatment until many hours after ingestion, thus limiting its effectiveness. Patients with severe vomiting or diarrhea can be rehydrated with intravenous fluids. Monitoring of biochemical parameters such as methemoglobin levels, electrolytes, liver and kidney function, urinalysis, and complete blood count is undertaken and any abnormalities are corrected. Dialysis can be used if kidney function is impaired or the kidneys are failing. Hemolysis may require a blood transfusion to replace the lost red blood cells, while methemoglobinemia is treated with intravenous methylene blue.

Pyridoxine, also known as vitamin B6, can be used to counteract the inhibition by MMH on the pyridoxine-dependent step in the synthesis of the neurotransmitter GABA. Thus GABA synthesis can continue and symptoms are relieved. Pyridoxine, which is only useful for the neurological symptoms and does not decrease hepatic toxicity, is given at a dose of 25 mg/kg; this can be repeated up to a maximum total of 15 to 30 g daily if symptoms do not improve. Benzodiazepines are given to control seizures; as they also modulate GABA receptors they may potentially increase the effect of pyridoxine. Additionally MMH inhibits the chemical transformation of folic acid into its active form, folinic acid, this can be treated by folinic acid given at 20–200 mg daily.

=== Long-term effects ===
==== ALS ====
Lagrange et al. presented in 2018 a link between life-long foraging for G. esculenta and amyotrophic lateral sclerosis (ALS) in French Alps populations. Similar ALS clusters possibly related to mushrooms are found near the Aosta Valley (Italy), in Sardinia, and in Michigan.

==== Carcinogenicity ====
Monomethylhydrazine, gyromitrin, raw Gyromitra esculenta, and N-methyl-N-formylhydrazine have been shown to be carcinogenic in experimental animals. Although Gyromitra esculenta has not been observed to cause cancer in humans, it is possible there is a carcinogenic risk for people who ingest these types of mushrooms. Even small amounts may have a carcinogenic effect. At least 11 different hydrazones have been isolated from G. esculenta, and it is not known if all potential carcinogens can be completely removed by parboiling.

== Consumption ==
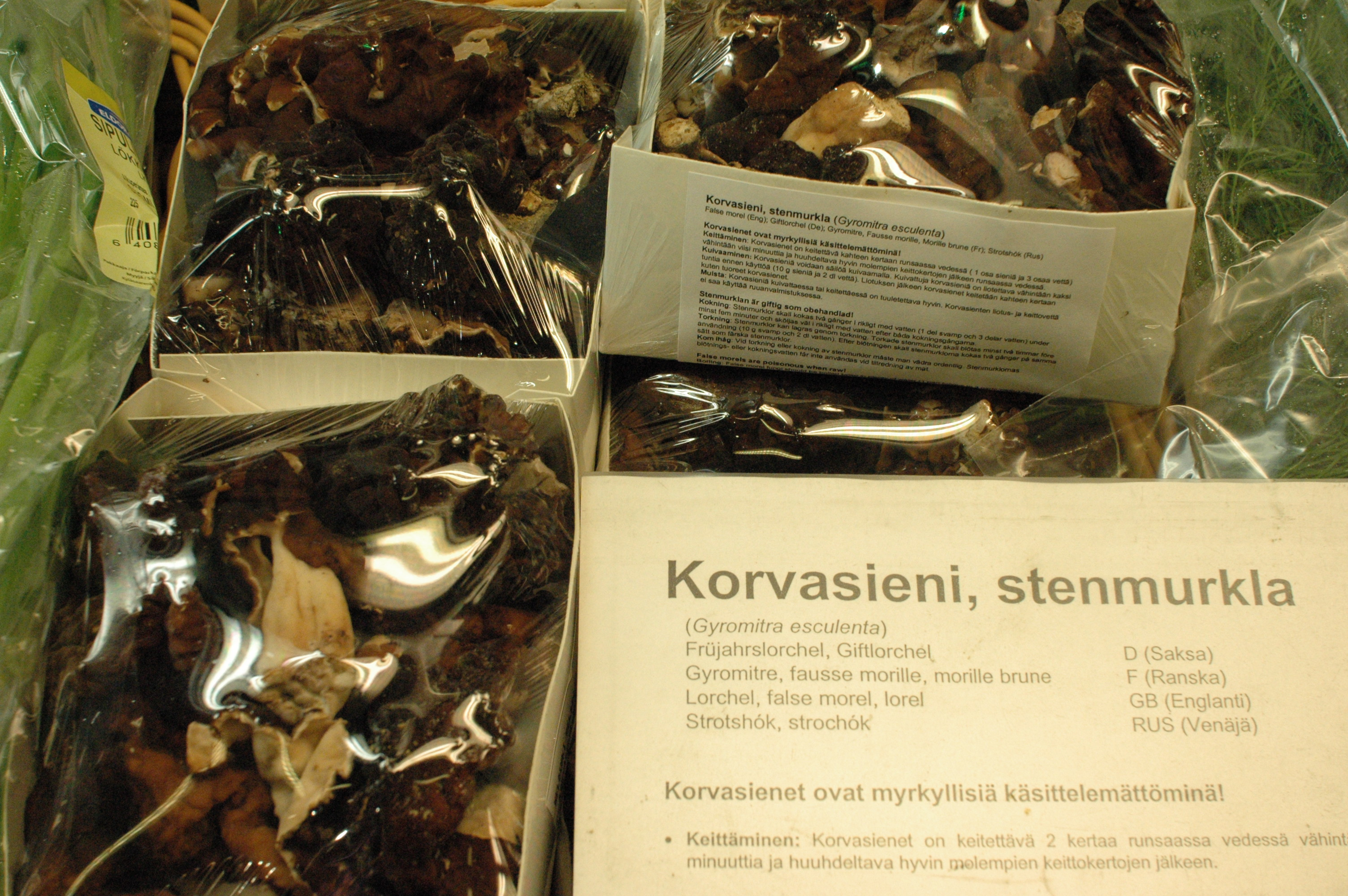
For sale in Helsinki, Finland with compulsory preparation instructions/safety datasheet

Despite its recognized toxicity, G. esculenta is marketed and consumed in several countries or states in Europe and North America. It was previously consumed in Germany, with fungi picked in and exported from Poland; more recently, however, Germany and Switzerland discouraged consumption by prohibiting its sale. Similarly in Sweden, the Swedish National Food Administration warns that it is not fit for human consumption, and restricts purchase of fresh mushrooms to restaurants alone.

The mushroom is still highly regarded and consumed in Bulgaria, being sold in markets and picked for export there. In some countries such as Spain, especially in the eastern Pyrenees, they are traditionally considered a delicacy, and many people report consuming them for many years with no ill effects. Despite this, the false morel is listed as hazardous in official mushroom lists published by the Catalan Government and sale to the public is prohibited throughout Spain. Outside of Europe, G. esculenta is consumed in the Great Lakes region and some western states in the United States.

Selling and purchasing fresh false morels is legal in Finland, where it is highly regarded. However, the mushrooms are required by law to be accompanied with a warning that they are poisonous and legally prescribed preparation instructions. False morels are also sold prepared and canned, in which case they are ready to be used. In Finnish cuisine, false morels may be cooked in an omelette, or gently sautéed in butter in a saucepan, flour and milk added to make a béchamel sauce, or pie filling. Alternatively, more fluid can be added for a false morel soup. Typical condiments added for flavour include parsley, chives, dill and black pepper.

In 2025 it was reported that a few years earlier the mushroom had been stripped of its status as an edible mushroom by the Finnish Food Agency. According to the agency this means the mushroom is no longer recommended for consumption, but that there is no recommendation against safe consumption either. They did, however, state that they are assesing the exposure of Finns to gyromitrin.

While cooking the fungus removes (most of) the toxins, the cook can become poisoned by the hydrazine fumes given off by cooking.

=== Controversies ===
In 2015, Swedish chef Paul Svensson caused a controversy when he prepared a dish with Gyromitra esculenta in a TV show. Mushroom expert Monica Svensson criticized him for including it, because monomethylhydrazine is a known carcinogen and there is a risk that inexperienced people might misinterpret the recipe and potentially poison themselves. She also expressed criticism to Per Morberg for similar reasons. Paul Svensson said that he was not aware of the carcinogenic effects and apologized afterwards, and he promised to remove Gyromitra from his dishes.

=== Preparation ===
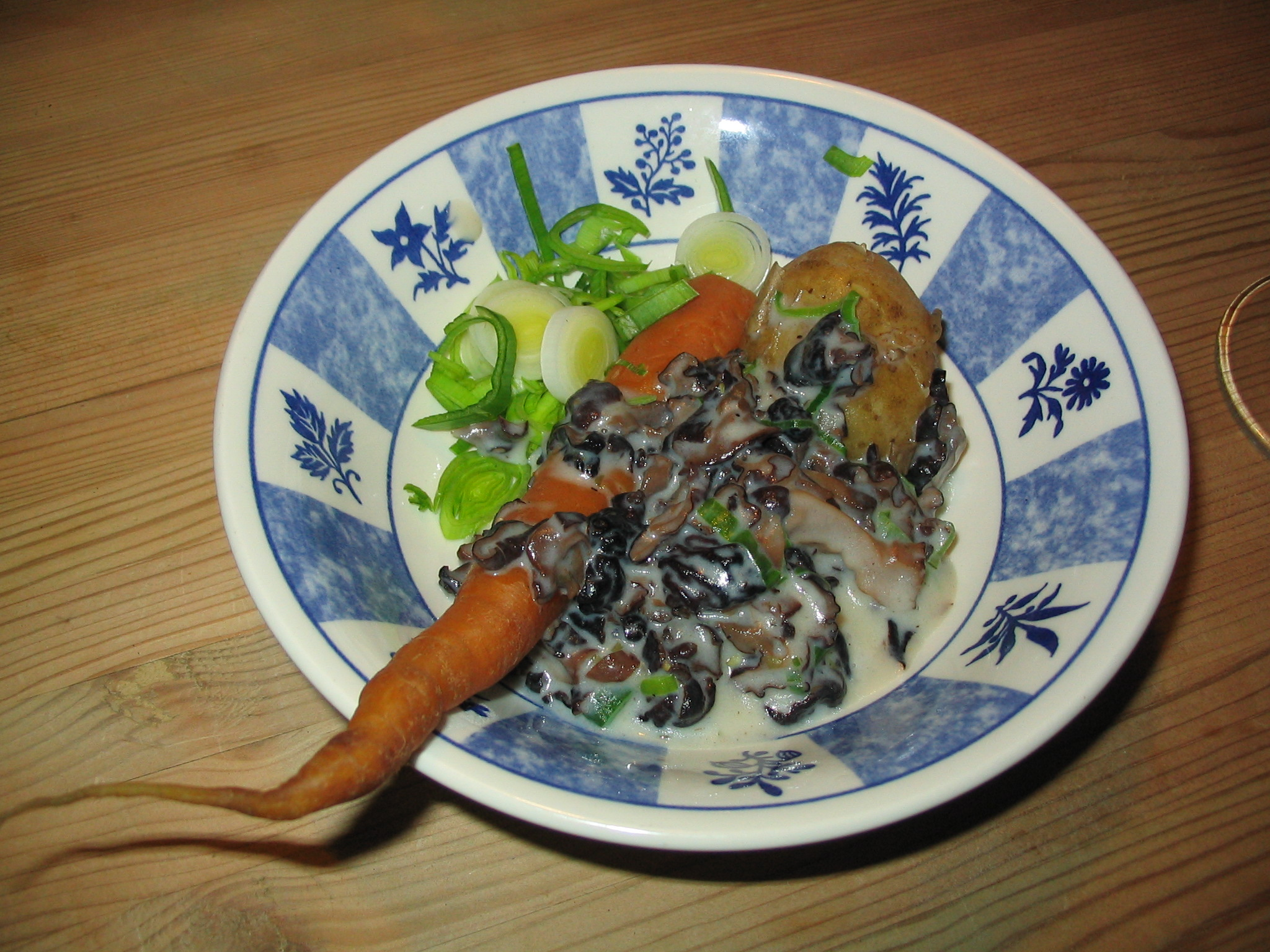
Cooked in a cream sauce

Most of the hydrazine derivatives must be removed to render this mushroom edible. The recommended procedure involves either first drying and then boiling the mushrooms, or boiling the fresh mushrooms directly. To prepare fresh mushroom it is recommended that they are cut into small pieces and parboiled twice in copious amounts of water, at least three parts water to one part chopped mushrooms, for at least five minutes, after each boiling the mushroom should be rinsed thoroughly in clean water. Each round of parboiling reduces the free gyromitrin contents to a tenth. Significant amounts of gyromitrin are retained in the internal structure of the mushroom even after boiling. After 3 rounds of boiling for 5 minutes and discarding the water, the gyromitrin content is reduced to 6-15% of the original. After 5 rounds, this content is reduced to 7%. The gyromitrin is leached into the water where it will remain, therefore the parboiling water must be discarded and replaced with fresh water after each round of boiling. However, it is still recommended that the mushroom be boiled after drying.

MMH boils at 87.5 °C (190 °F) and thus readily vaporizes into the air when water containing fresh false morels is boiled. If boiling the mushrooms indoors, care should be taken to ensure adequate ventilation, and, if symptoms of monomethylhydrazine poisoning appear, immediately open all windows and move outside to seek fresh air. Even after boiling, small amounts of gyromitrin and other hydrazine derivatives remain in the mushrooms. Given the possibility of accumulation of toxins, repeated consumption is not recommended.

=== Prospects for cultivation ===
Strains with much lower concentrations of gyromitrin have been discovered, and the fungus has been successfully grown to fruiting in culture. Thus there is scope for future research into cultivation of safer strains.

== See also ==
- List of deadly fungi
