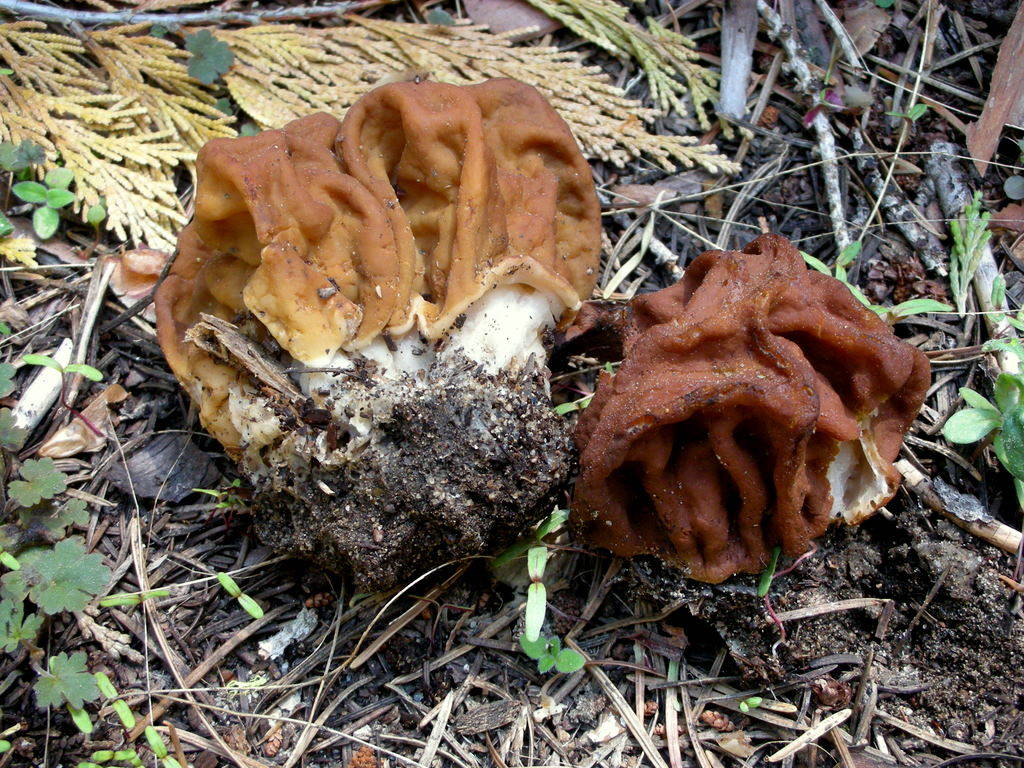

Scientific classification
- Kingdom: Fungi
- Division: Ascomycota
- Class: Pezizomycetes
- Order: Pezizales
- Family: Discinaceae
- Genus: Discina
- Species: D. gigas

Binomial name
- Discina gigas (Krombh.) Eckblad (1968)

Synonyms
- List: Helvella gigas Krombh. (1834); Gyromitra gigas (Krombh.) Quél. (1873); Neogyromitra gigas (Krombh.) S.Imai (1938); Maublancomyces gigas (Krombh.) Herter (1950); Gyromitra curtipes Fr. (1861); Helvella curtipes (Fr.) P. Karst. (1871); Maublancomyces curtipes (Fr.) Herter (1951); Gyromitra gigas var. pumila Velen. (1934); Gyromitra ussuriensis Lj.N. Vassiljeva (1950); Neogyromitra ussuriensis (Lj.N. Vassiljeva) Raitv. (1964)

= Discina gigas =

Species of fungus

Discina gigas
- Mycological characteristics
- Smooth hymenium
- Cap is convex
- Hymenium attachment is irregular or not applicable
- Stipe is bare
- Spore print is yellow to buff
- Ecology is saprotrophic or mycorrhizal
- Edibility is not recommended

Discina gigas, commonly known as the snow mushroom, snowbank false morel, walnut, giants false morel, snow morel, snow false morel, calf brain, or bull nose, is a species of fungus and a member of the Ascomycota found in Europe.

It is referred to as one of the false morels, due to its similar appearance and occurrence in the spring and early summer in similar habitats to true morels (Morchella ssp.).

== Taxonomy ==
The species was first described scientifically by Julius Vincenz von Krombholz as Helvella gigas.

== Description ==
The tannish, wrinkled cap grows up to 10 centimetres (4 in) broad and 6 cm tall. The whitish stalk is typically almost as thick as the cap, up to 10 cm long and broad.

=== Similar species ===
Many of the common names of Discina gigas refer to both its resemblance to true morels, Morchella ssp., and to the related genus Gyromitra.

A very similar and directly related species, D. montana, occurs in North America; it apparently has larger spores than D. gigas. While both species are reportedly edible in small amounts if thoroughly cooked, eating is not recommended due to their similarity to more toxic species of mushrooms.

== Toxicity ==
It contains small quantities of hydrazines; its content in gyromitrin was scientifically assessed by Viernstein et al. (1980) and resulted of about 1mg per kg of fresh mushroom (roughly 1,500-fold less compared to that of Gyromitra esculenta). Though no casualties have been ascribed to its consumption, parboiling is still highly recommended. Some guides have listed it as being edible if properly prepared. However, consumption is not recommended due to variability and similarity to other more toxic species of Gyromitra.

This fungus has been banned for sale in France since 1991 due to potential toxicity, the effects of which would cause a fairly rare fatal neurodegenerative disease, amyotrophic lateral sclerosis (ALS).
