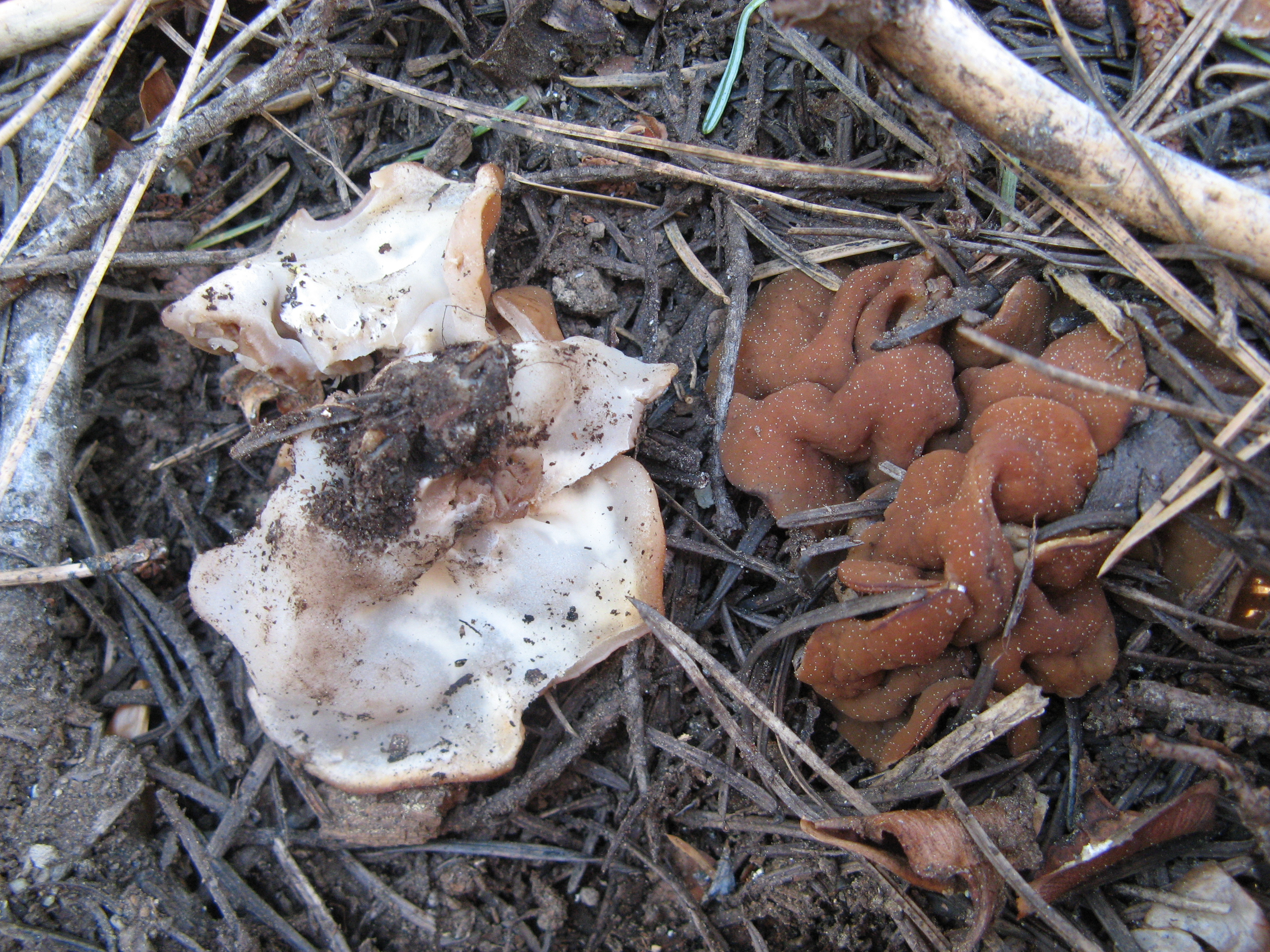
- Discina ancilis

Scientific classification
- Kingdom: Fungi
- Division: Ascomycota
- Class: Pezizomycetes
- Order: Pezizales
- Family: Discinaceae
- Genus: Discina (Fr.) Fr. (1849)

Type species
- Discina perlata Fr. (1849)

Synonyms
- Peziza a Discina Fr. (1822); Discinella P.Karst. (1891)

= Discina (fungus) =

Genus of fungi

Discina is a genus of ascomycete fungi related to the false morels of the genus Gyromitra. There are about 20 species in the genus. They bear dish- or cup-shaped fruit bodies. The best known member is the pig ear (D. ancilis), which is deemed edible after thorough cooking, although is viewed with suspicion given its relation to the highly toxic false morels.

== Species ==
The following species are recognised in the genus Discina:

- Discina accumbens Rahm (1970)
- Discina ancilis (Pers.) Sacc. (1889)
- Discina australica Cooke (1892)
- Discina boudieri Sacc. (1889)
- Discina brunnea (Underw.) Raitv. (1970)
- Discina caroliniana (Bosc) Eckblad (1968)
- Discina corticalis (P. Karst.) Sacc. (1895)
- Discina disticha Starbäck (1905)
- Discina epixyla Pat. (1903)
- Discina fastigiata (Krombh.) Svrček & J. Moravec (1972)
- Discina ferruginascens (Boud.) Sacc. & Traverso (1910)
- Discina geogenia Rahm ex Donadini (1985)
- Discina gigas (Krombh.) Eckblad (1968)
- Discina khanspurensis (Jabeen & Khalid) X.C. Wang & W.Y. Zhuang (2023)
- Discina lenta Starbäck (1905)
- Discina martinii (Donadini & Astier) Donadini & Astier (1985)
- Discina megalospora (Donadini & Riousset) Donadini & Riousset (1985)
- Discina melaleuca Bres. (1898)
- Discina montana (Harmaja) Ginns (1975)
- Discina pallida Velen. (1922)
- Discina pallidorosea Henn. (1902)
- Discina pseudogigas (X.C. Wang & W.Y. Zhuang) X.C. Wang & W.Y. Zhuang (2023)
- Discina radiosensilis Falck (1916)
- Discina roblinensis Wichanský (1963)
- Discina ticiniana (Littini) X.C. Wang & W.Y. Zhuang (2023)
- Discina urnula Velen. (1922)
