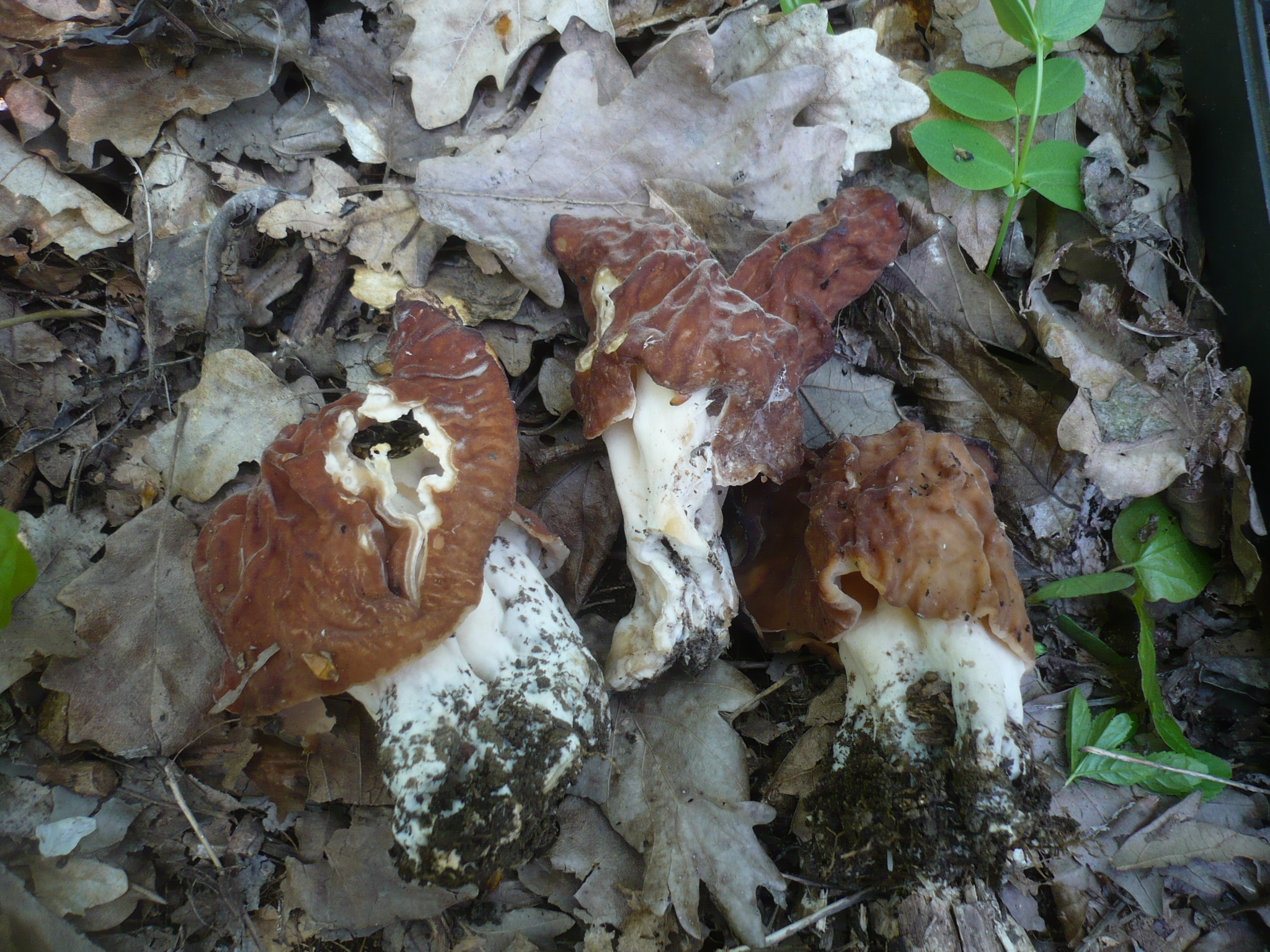

Scientific classification
- Domain: Eukaryota
- Kingdom: Fungi
- Division: Ascomycota
- Class: Pezizomycetes
- Order: Pezizales
- Family: Discinaceae
- Genus: Discina
- Species: D. fastigiata

Binomial name
- Discina fastigiata (Krombh.) Svrček & J. Moravec (1972)

Synonyms
- List: Helvella fastigiata Krombh. (1834); Gyromitra fastigiata (Krombh.) Rehm (1895); Physomitra infula var. fastigiata (Krombh.) Boud. (1907); Maublancomyces fastigiatus (Krombh.) Herter (1951); Maublancomyces fastigiata (Krombh.) Herter (1951); Neogyromitra fastigiata (Krombh.) McKnight (1968)

= Discina fastigiata =

Species of fungus

Discina fastigiata is a species of fungus in the family Discinaceae. Its common names are brown false morel and brown gyromitra. It is related to species containing the toxin monomethylhydrazine, so its consumption is not advised.

== Description ==
The cap of Discina fastigiata is 4-10 cm wide, and is composed of multiple upwardly curved lobes, usually with three tips. The texture is ribbed and brain-like. The lobes are irregularly folded over and sloped towards the stem. The colour varies from yellow to reddish-brown to black, when the spores are mature. The inside of the cap is hollow and white.

The stipe is chalk-white and cylindrical, though thickening at the base and ribbed like the cap. Inside it is made out of hollow or stuffed connected channels. It measures 60-80 mm long and 25-60 mm thick. The lower part of the stipe is always covered in dirt. The flesh is white and fragile. Its texture is watery to succulent. It smells slightly sperm-like.

The hymenium (spore-bearing surface) is on the outside of the cap. The transparent spores are long and elliptical, measuring 25–30 × 11–14 μm. The surface of the spores is rough to webbed and they contain 1-3 oil drops. Each ascus contains 8 spores, and measures 18-25 x 440-525 μm. The walls of the asci show no reaction in Melzer's reagant.

It has 5-9 μm wide, thin-walled, yellow-brown paraphyses with 3-5 septa.

== Distribution ==
Discina fastigiata grows in southeastern and midwestern United States, as well as the Great Lakes region. It fruits throughout spring. It grows alone or in groups on soil, leaf litter or rotting wood in hardwood forests.
