= False morel =

Name for several species of mushroom

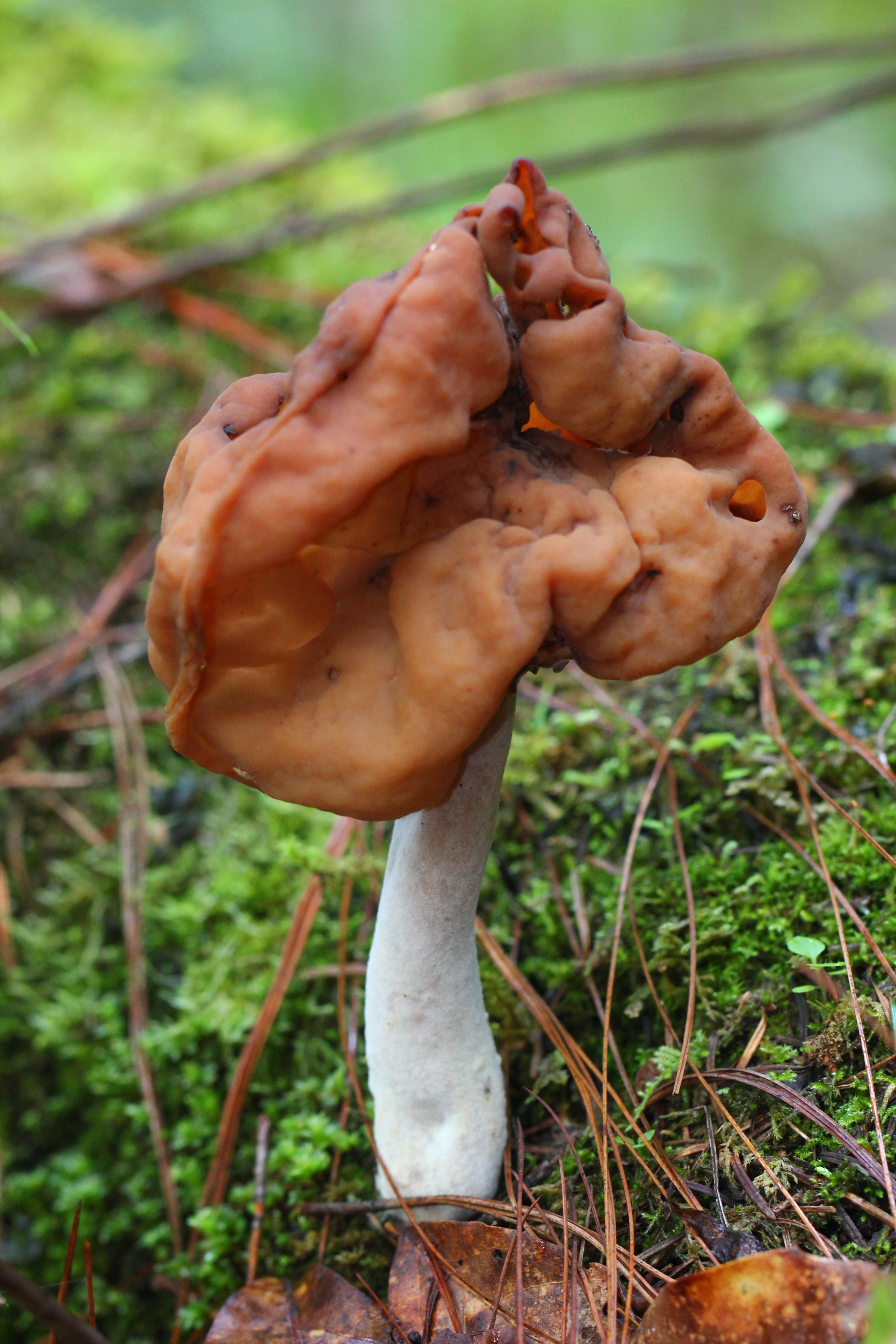
A false morel is a fungus which looks very similar to a morel or Morchella

The name false morel is given to several species of mushroom which bear a resemblance to the highly regarded true morels of the genus Morchella. Like Morchella, false morels are members of the Pezizales, but within that group represent several unrelated taxa scattered through the families Morchellaceae, Discinaceae, and Helvellaceae, with the epithet "false morel" most often ascribed to members of the genus Gyromitra.

== Compared to morels ==
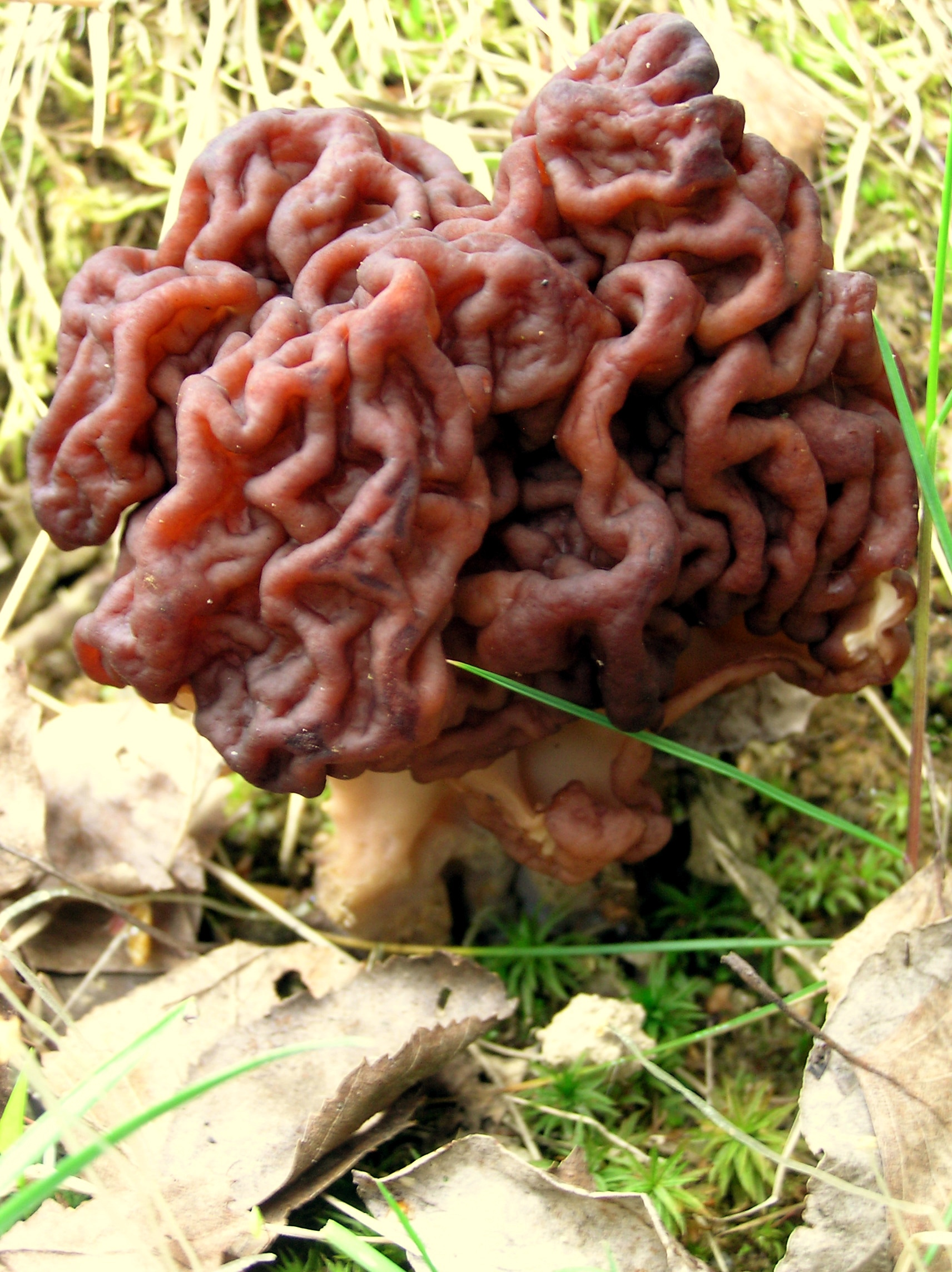
Gyromitra esculenta, a false morel

A great many morel lookalikes, and morels themselves, are toxic or cause gastrointestinal upset when consumed raw; furthermore, some of them such as Gyromitra esculenta remain toxic even after conventional cooking methods. Although some false morels can be eaten without ill effect, others can cause severe gastrointestinal upset, loss of muscular coordination (including cardiac muscle), or even death. Incidents of poisoning usually occur when they are eaten in large quantities, inadequately cooked, or over several days in a row. Some species contain gyromitrin, a toxic and carcinogenic organic compound, which is hydrolyzed in the body into monomethylhydrazine (MMH). Gyromitra esculenta in particular has been reported to be responsible for up to 23% of mushroom fatalities each year in Poland. G. esculenta—regarded as delicious—is known to be potentially deadly when eaten fresh, but research in the 1990s showed that toxins remain even after proper treatment. While many people freely eat false morels, potentially even toxic species, without apparent harm, some people have developed acute toxicity and recent evidence suggests that there may be long-term health risks as well, including amyotrophic lateral sclerosis (ALS). There is speculation that false morel consumption has caused clusters of ALS in the French Alps.

The key morphological features distinguishing some of the false morels from true morels are as follows:

- Gyromitra species often have a wrinkled or brain-like appearance to the cap due to multiple wrinkles and folds, rather than the honeycomb appearance of true morels due to ridges and pits. Some species of Gyromitra do not contain gyromitrin, but are potentially easy to confuse with Gyromitra esculenta and other toxic species in the areas where their ranges overlap.
- Gyromitra esculenta has a cap that is usually reddish-brown in colour, but sometimes also chestnut, purplish-brown, or dark brown.
- Gyromitra species are typically chambered in longitudinal section, while Verpa species contain a cottony substance inside their stem, in contrast to true morels which are always hollow.
- The caps of Verpa species (V. bohemica, V. conica and others) are attached to the stem only at the apex (top of the cap), unlike true morels which have caps that are attached to the stem at, or near the base of the cap, or halfway along the stem ("half-free morels"). The easiest way to distinguish Verpa species from Morchella species is to slice them longitudinally. Since all known Verpa species are safe to eat if prepared similarly to morels, there is little risk in mistaking them for morels.

== See also ==
- Gyromitrin, a toxic chemical in Gyromitra fungi
