= Gyromitrin =

Wireframe model of gyromitrin
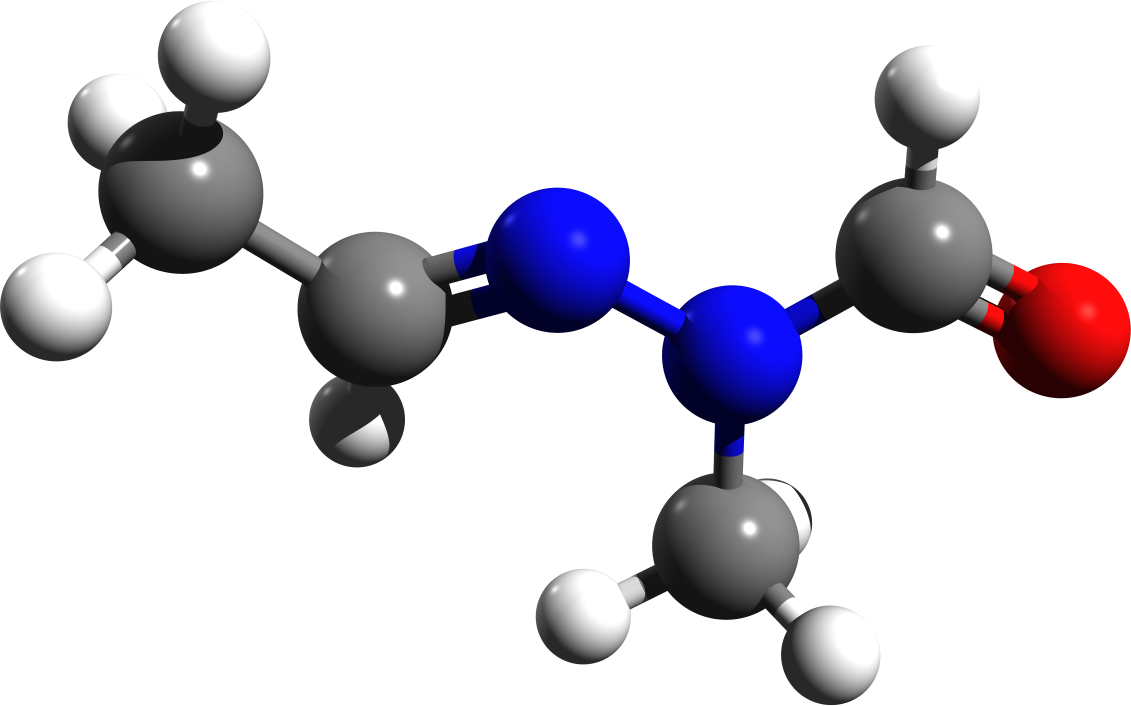
Ball and stick model of gyromitrin

Names
- IUPAC name N′-Ethylidene-N-methylformohydrazide
- Other names Acetaldehyde methylformylhydrazone Formic acid 2-ethylidene-1-methylhydrazide

Identifiers
| CAS Number | 16568-02-8 |
| 3D model (JSmol) | Interactive image |
| Beilstein Reference | 1922396 |
| ChEBI | CHEBI:5583 |
| ChemSpider | 25985; 7827534 (1E); 19957776 (1Z) |
| KEGG | C08305 |
| MeSH | Gyromitrin |
| PubChem CID | 27932; 9548611 (1E); 5365327 (1Z) |
| UNII | S9J72G0T46 |
| CompTox Dashboard (EPA) | DTXSID0039225 |
- InChI: InChI=1S/C4H8N2O/c1-3-5-6(2)4-7/h3-4H,1-2H3 Key: IMAGWKUTFZRWSB-UHFFFAOYSA-N
- SMILES: CC=NN(C)C=O

Properties
| Chemical formula | C_{4}H_{8}N_{2}O |
| Molar mass | 100.121 g·mol^{−1} |
| Boiling point | 143 °C (289 °F; 416 K) |

Hazards
- Occupational safety and health (OHS/OSH)
| Main hazards | highly toxic and reactive liquid |
- Except where otherwise noted, data are given for materials in their standard state (at 25 °C [77 °F], 100 kPa). Infobox references

Gyromitrin is a toxin and carcinogen present in several members of the fungal genus Gyromitra, like G. esculenta. Its formula is C_{4}H_{8}N_{2}O. It is unstable and is easily hydrolyzed to the toxic compound monomethylhydrazine CH_{3}NHNH_{2}. Monomethylhydrazine acts on the central nervous system and interferes with the normal use and function of vitamin B_{6}. Poisoning results in nausea, stomach cramps, and diarrhea, while severe poisoning can result in convulsions, jaundice, or even coma or death. Exposure to monomethylhydrazine has been shown to be carcinogenic in small mammals.

== History ==
Poisonings related to consumption of the false morel Gyromitra esculenta, a highly regarded fungus eaten mainly in Finland and by some in parts of Europe and North America, had been reported for at least a hundred years. Experts speculated the reaction was more of an allergic one specific to the consumer, or a misidentification, rather than innate toxicity of the fungus, due to the wide range in effects seen. Some would suffer severely or perish while others exhibited no symptoms after eating similar amounts of mushrooms from the same dish. Yet others would be poisoned after previously eating the fungus for many years without ill-effects. In 1885, Böhm and Külz described helvellic acid, an oily substance they believed to be responsible for the toxicity of the fungus. The identity of the toxic constituents of Gyromitra species eluded researchers until 1968, when N-methyl-N-formylhydrazone was isolated by German scientists List and Luft and named gyromitrin. Each kilogram of fresh false morel had between 1.2 and 1.6 grams of the compound.

== Mechanism of toxicity ==
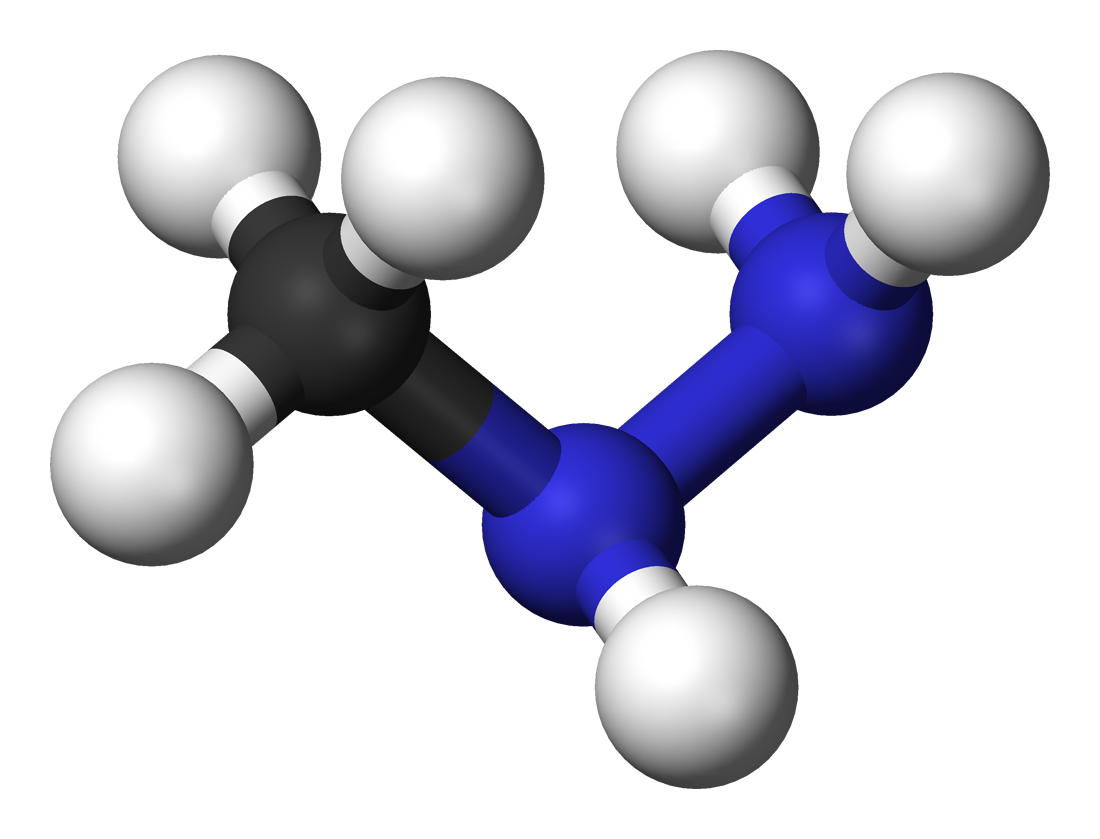
Monomethylhydrazine (MMH; CH_{3}NHNH_{2}), a toxic metabolite

Gyromitrin is a volatile, water-soluble hydrazine compound that is rapidly metabolized into monomethylhydrazine (MMH) through the intermediate N-methyl-N-formylhydrazine.

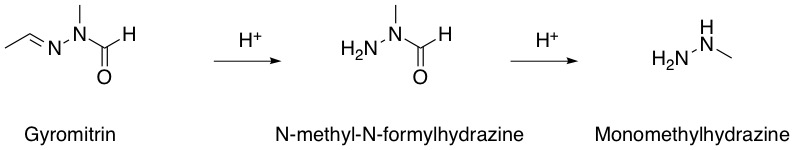
Gyromitrin metabolism

Other N-methyl-N-formylhydrazone derivatives have been isolated in subsequent research, although they are present in smaller amounts. These other compounds would also produce monomethylhydrazine when hydrolyzed, although it remains unclear how much each contributes to the false morel's toxicity.

The toxins react with pyridoxal 5-phosphate—the activated form of pyridoxine—and form a hydrazone. This reduces production of the neurotransmitter GABA via decreased activity of glutamic acid decarboxylase, which gives rise to the neurological symptoms. MMH also causes oxidative stress leading to methemoglobinemia. Additionally during the metabolism of MMH, N-methyl-N-formylhydrazine is produced; this then undergoes cytochrome P450 oxidative metabolism which produces large amounts of hepatotoxic free radicals in a manner similar to the metabolism of carbon tetrachloride. Inhibition of diamine oxidase (histaminase) elevates histamine levels, resulting in headaches, nausea, vomiting, and abdominal pain. Giving pyridoxine to rats poisoned with gyromitrin inhibited seizures, but did not prevent liver damage.

The toxicity of gyromitrin varies greatly according to the animal species being tested. Tests of administering gyromitrin to mice to observe the correlation between the formation of MMH and stomach pH have been performed. Higher levels of formed MMH were observed in the stomachs of the mice than were observed in control tests under less acidic conditions. The conclusions drawn were that the formation of MMH in a stomach is likely a result of acid hydrolysis of gyromitrin rather than enzymatic metabolism. Based on this animal experimentation, it is reasonable to infer that a more acidic stomach environment would transform more gyromitrin into MMH, independent of the species in which the reaction is occurring.

The median lethal dose (LD_{50}) is 244 mg/kg in mice, 50–70 mg/kg in rabbits, and 30–50 mg/kg in humans. The toxicity is largely due to the MMH that is created; about 35% of ingested gyromitrin is transformed to MMH. Based on this conversion, the LD_{50} of MMH in humans has been estimated to be 1.6–4.8 mg/kg in children, and 4.8–8 mg/kg in adults.

== Occurrence and removal ==
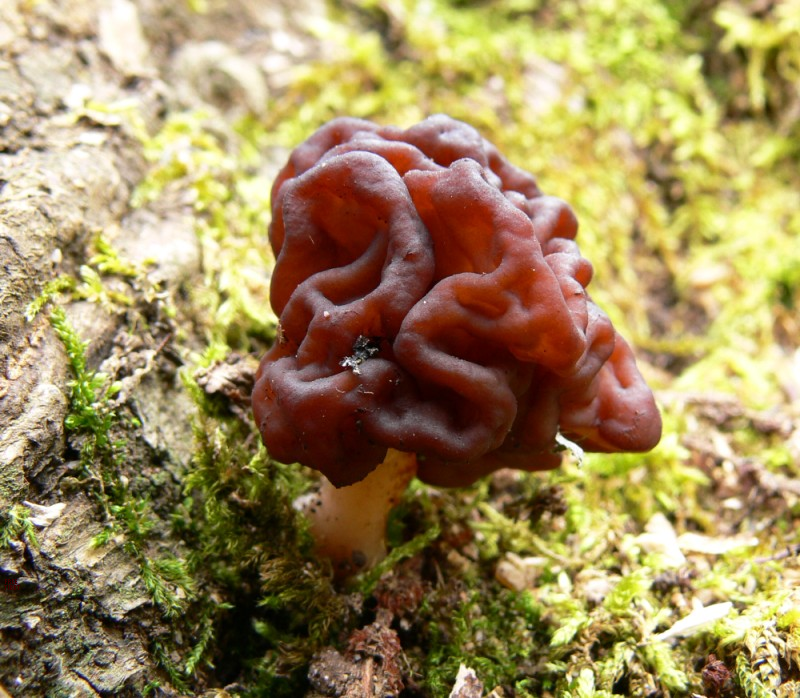
Gyromitra esculenta

Several Gyromitra species are traditionally considered very good edibles and several steps are available to remove gyromitrin from these mushrooms and allow their consumption. For North America, the toxin has been reliably reported from the species G. esculenta, G. gigas, and G. fastigiata. Species in which gyromitrin's presence is suspected, but not proven, include G. californica, G. caroliniana, G. korfii, and G. sphaerospora, in addition to Disciotis venosa and Sarcosphaera coronaria. The possible presence of the toxin renders these species "suspected, dangerous, or not recommended" for consumption.

Gyromitrin content can differ greatly in different populations of the same species. For example, G. esculenta collected from Europe is "almost uniformly toxic", compared to rarer reports of toxicity from specimens collected from the US west of the Rocky Mountains. A 1985 study reported that the stems of G. esculenta contained twice as much gyromitrin as the cap, and that mushrooms collected at higher altitudes contained less of the toxin than those collected at lower altitudes.

The gyromitrin content in false morels has been reported to be in the range of 40–732 milligrams of gyromitrin per kilogram of mushrooms (wet weight). Gyromitrin is volatile and water soluble, and can be mostly removed from the mushrooms by cutting them to small pieces and repeatedly boiling them in copious amounts of water under good ventilation. Prolonged periods of air drying also reduces levels of the toxin. In the US, there are typically between 30 and 100 cases of gyromitrin poisoning requiring medical attention. The mortality rate for cases worldwide is about 10%.

== Detection ==
The early methods developed for the determination of gyromitrin concentration in mushroom tissue were based on thin-layer chromatography and spectrofluorometry, or the electrochemical oxidation of hydrazine. These methods require large amounts of sample, are labor-intensive and unspecific. A 2006 study reported an analytical method based on gas chromatography-mass spectrometry with detection levels at the parts per billion level. The method, which involves acid hydrolysis of gyromitrin followed by derivatization with pentafluorobenzoyl chloride, has a minimum detectable concentration equivalent to 0.3 microgram of gyromitrin per gram of dry matter.

== Identification ==
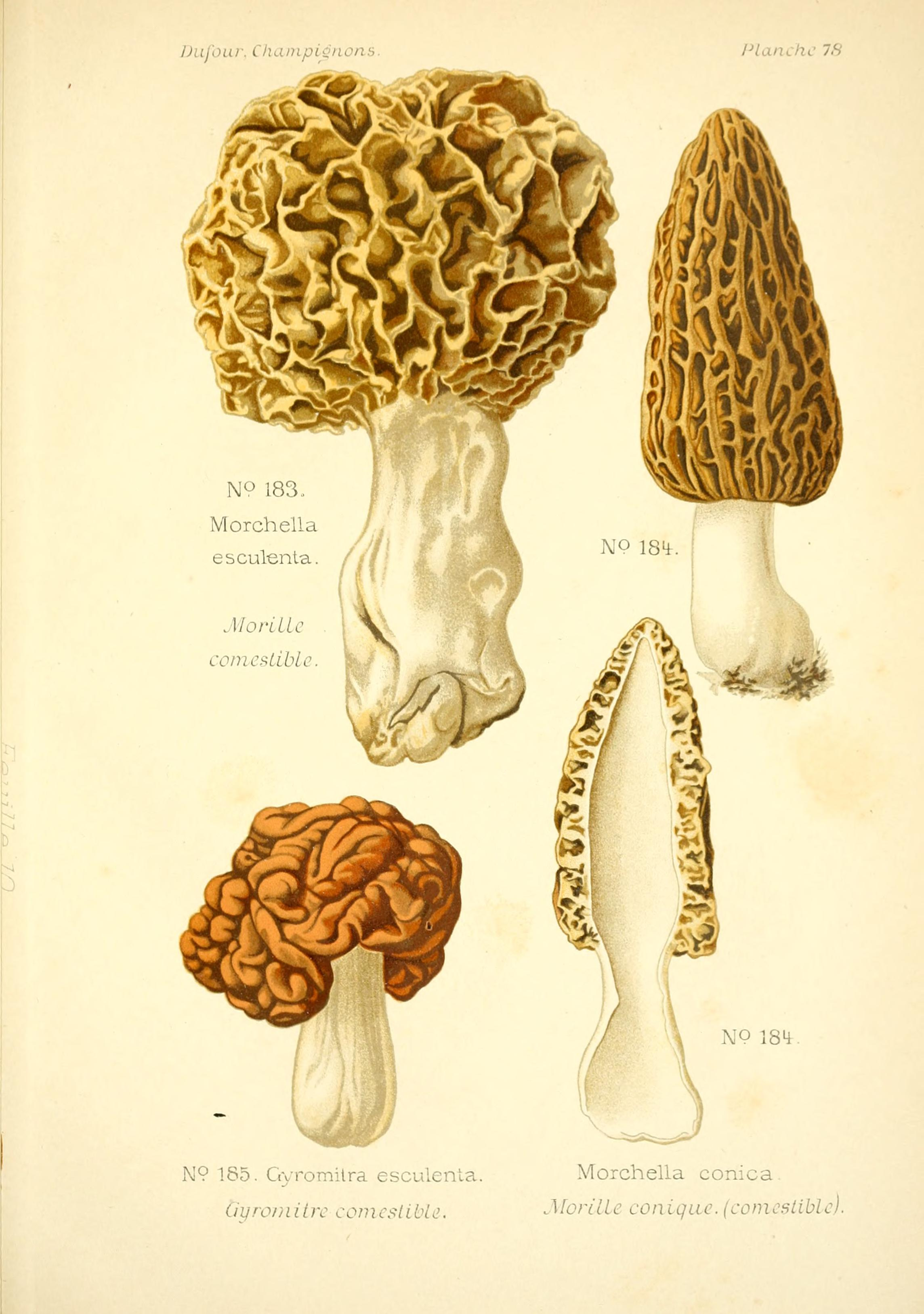
Comparison of Gyromitra esculenta and a morel mushroom

When foraging for mushrooms in the wild, it is important to be cautious of ones that may not be safe to eat. Morel mushrooms are highly sought after; however, they can easily be confused with Gyromitra esculenta, also known as “false morels”. There are a few differing characteristics between the two species that can be used to avoid accidental poisoning. The cap of a real morel mushroom attaches directly to the stem, while the cap of a false morel grows around the stem. Real morel mushrooms are also hollow from top to bottom when cut in half, which varies from the filled nature of false morels. Finally, based on outward appearance, real morels are rather uniformly shaped and covered in pits that seem to fall inwards, whereas false morels are often considered more irregularly shaped with wavy ridges that seem to form outwards.

== Poisoning ==
=== Symptoms ===
The symptoms of poisoning are typically gastrointestinal and neurological. Symptoms occur within 6–12 hours of consumption, although cases of more severe poisoning may present sooner—as little as 2 hours after ingestion. Initial symptoms are gastrointestinal, with sudden onset of nausea, vomiting, and watery diarrhea which may be bloodstained. Dehydration may develop if the vomiting or diarrhea is severe. Dizziness, lethargy, vertigo, tremor, ataxia, nystagmus, and headaches develop soon after; fever often occurs, a distinctive feature which does not develop after poisoning by other types of mushrooms. In most cases of poisoning, symptoms do not progress from these initial symptoms, and patients recover after 2–6 days of illness.

In some cases there may be an asymptomatic phase following the initial symptoms which is then followed by more significant toxicity including kidney damage, liver damage, and neurological dysfunction including seizures and coma. These signs usually develop within 1–3 days in serious cases. The patient develops jaundice and the liver and spleen become enlarged, in some cases blood sugar levels will rise (hyperglycemia) and then fall (hypoglycemia) and liver toxicity is seen. Additionally, intravascular hemolysis causes destruction of red blood cells resulting in increases in free hemoglobin and hemoglobinuria, which can lead to kidney toxicity or kidney failure. Methemoglobinemia may also occur in some cases. This is where higher than normal levels of methemoglobin—a form of hemoglobin that can not carry oxygen—are found in the blood. It causes the patient to become short of breath and cyanotic. Cases of severe poisoning may progress to a terminal neurological phase, with delirium, muscle fasciculations and seizures, and mydriasis progressing to coma, circulatory collapse, and respiratory arrest. Death may occur from five to seven days after consumption.

Toxic effects from gyromitrin may also be accumulated from sub-acute and chronic exposure due to "professional handling"; symptoms include pharyngitis, bronchitis, and keratitis.

=== Treatment ===
Treatment is mainly supportive; gastric decontamination with activated charcoal may be beneficial if medical attention is sought within a few hours of consumption. However, symptoms often take longer than this to develop, and patients do not usually present for treatment until many hours after ingestion, thus limiting its effectiveness. Patients with severe vomiting or diarrhea can be rehydrated with intravenous fluids. Monitoring of biochemical parameters such as methemoglobin levels, electrolytes, liver and kidney function, urinalysis, and complete blood count is undertaken and any abnormalities are corrected. Dialysis can be used if kidney function is impaired or the kidneys are failing. Hemolysis may require a blood transfusion to replace the lost red blood cells, while methemoglobinemia is treated with intravenous methylene blue.

Pyridoxine, also known as vitamin B_{6}, can be used to counteract the inhibition by MMH on the pyridoxine-dependent step in the synthesis of the neurotransmitter GABA. Thus GABA synthesis can continue and symptoms are relieved. Pyridoxine, which is only useful for the neurological symptoms and does not decrease hepatic toxicity, is given at a dose of 25 mg/kg; this can be repeated up to a maximum total of 15 to 30 g daily if symptoms do not improve. Benzodiazepines are given to control seizures; as they also modulate GABA receptors they may potentially increase the effect of pyridoxine. Additionally MMH inhibits the chemical transformation of folic acid into its active form, folinic acid, this can be treated by folinic acid given at 20–200 mg daily.

=== Toxicity controversy ===
Due to variances seen in the effects of consumption of the Gyromitra esculenta, there is some controversy surrounding its toxicity. Historically, there was some confusion over what was causing the symptoms to form after consuming the mushrooms. Over time, there were poisonings across Europe due to the consumption of Gyromitra mushrooms; however, the toxin causing the poisonings was unknown at that time. In 1793, mushroom poisonings that occurred in France were attributed to Morchella pleopus, and in 1885, the poisonings were said to be caused by “helvellic acid”. The identity of the toxin found in Gyromitra was not known until List and Luft of Germany were able to isolate and identify the structure of gyromitrin from these mushrooms in 1968.

Gyromitrin may not be considered especially toxic, which may lead people to underestimate its poisonous qualities. In Poland, from 1953 to 1962, there were 138 documented poisonings, only two of which were fatal. Of 706 calls to the Swedish poison center regarding Gyromitra mushrooms between 1994 and 2002, there were no fatalities. In the United States from 2001 to 2011, 448 calls to poison centers involved gyromitrin. The North American Mycological Association (NAMA) reported on 27 cases over 30 years, none of which were fatal. Although poisonings due to gyromitrin are not often fatal, it is still highly toxic to the liver. Of those 27 analyzed cases, nine developed liver injury; there were also three instances of acute kidney injury. As gyromitrin is not especially stable, most poisonings apparently occur from the consumption of the raw or insufficiently cooked "false morel" mushrooms.

There are also possibly several strains of Gyromitra esculenta that vary from region to region and have differing levels of the toxin. For example, there is a substantially less toxic variety that grows west of the Rockies in North America. The toxin may also diminish as the seasons change, as most exposures occur in the Spring. This may help explain some conflicting reports on whether the fungus is edible or not.

== Carcinogenicity ==
Monomethylhydrazine, as well as methylformylhydrazine and gyromitrin and raw Gyromitra esculenta, have been shown to be carcinogenic in experimental animals. Although Gyromitra esculenta has not been observed to cause cancer in humans, it is possible there is a carcinogenic risk for people who ingest these types of mushrooms. Even small amounts may have a carcinogenic effect. At least 11 different potentially toxic and carcinogenic natural products have been isolated from Gyromitra esculenta, and it is not known if they can be completely removed by parboiling.
