= Monomethylhydrazine =

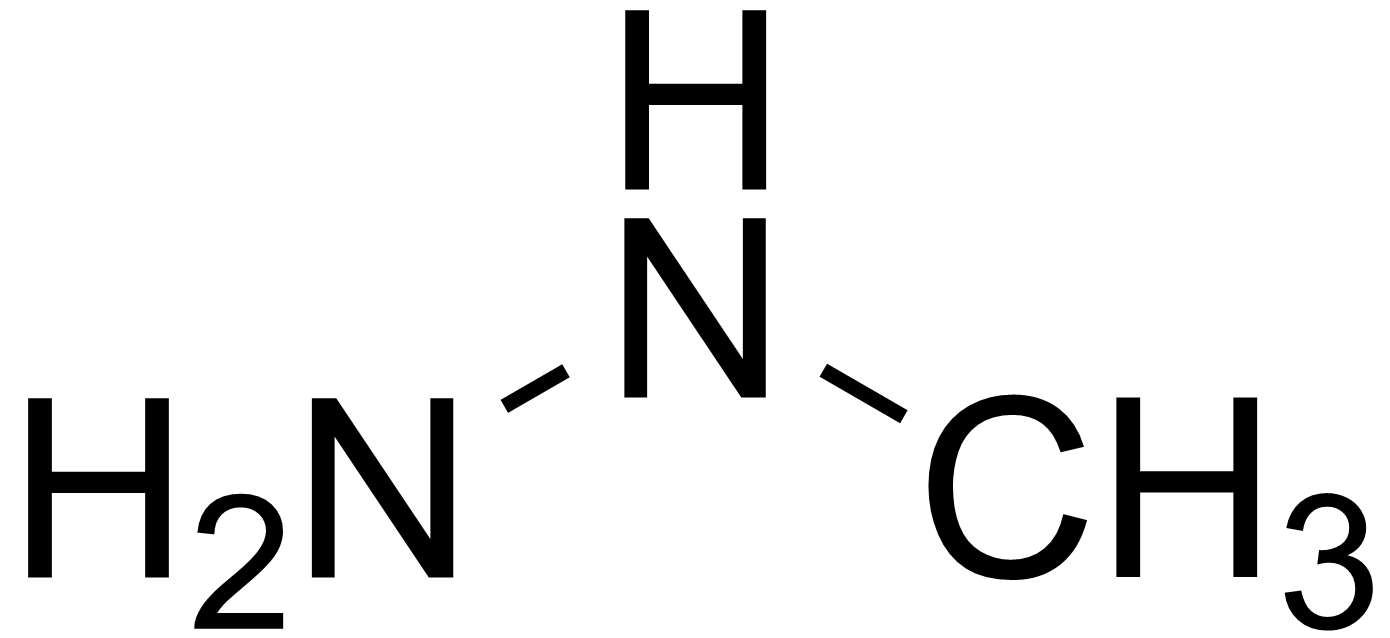
Skeletal formula of monomethylhydrazine with some implicit hydrogens shown
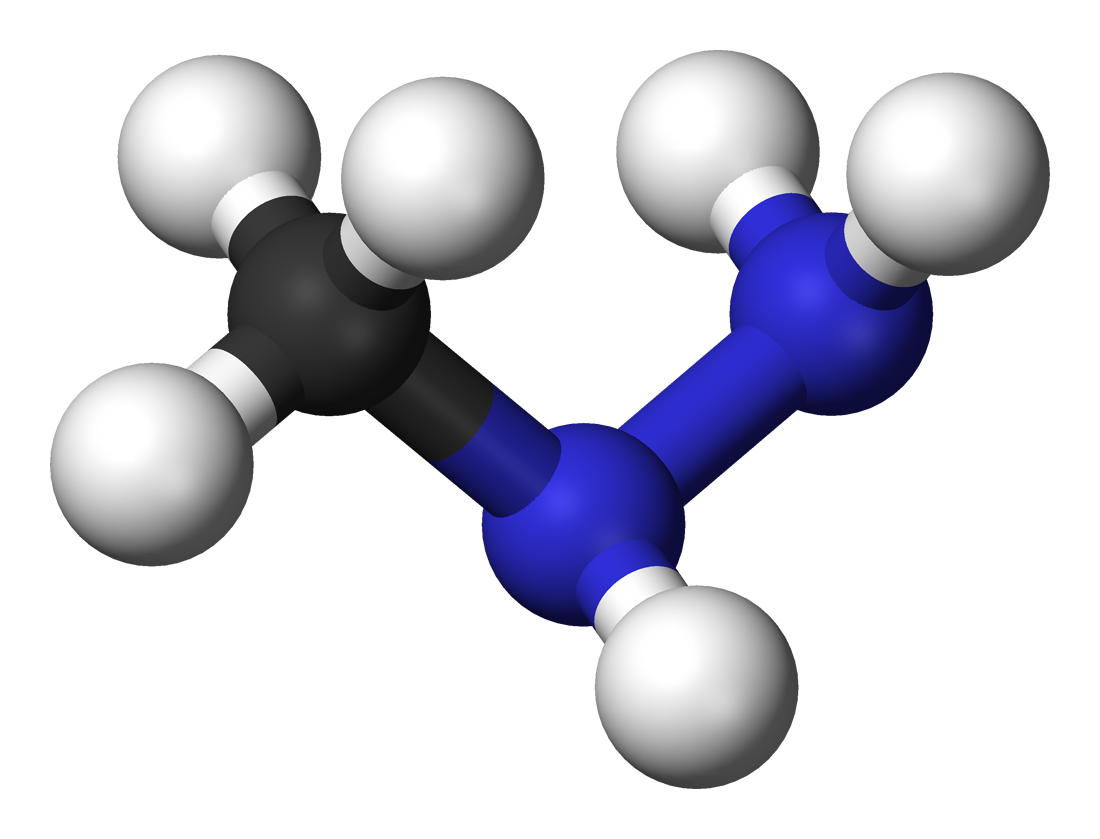
Ball and stick model of monomethylhydrazine

Names
- Preferred IUPAC name Methylhydrazine
- Other names Methyldiazane, monomethyl hydrazine

Identifiers
CAS Number	60-34-4
3D model (JSmol)	Interactive image
Beilstein Reference	635645
ChEMBL	ChEMBL160520
ChemSpider	5837
ECHA InfoCard	100.000.429
EC Number	200-471-4
MeSH	Monomethylhydrazine
PubChem CID	6061
RTECS number	MV5600000
UNII	UWA30B5Z1J
UN number	1244
CompTox Dashboard (EPA)	DTXSID4020874
- InChI: InChI=1S/CH6N2/c1-3-2/h3H,2H2,1H3 Key: HDZGCSFEDULWCS-UHFFFAOYSA-N
- SMILES: CNN

Properties
Chemical formula	CH_{6}N_{2}
Molar mass	46.073 g·mol^{−1}
Appearance	Fuming, colourless liquid
Odor	Fish-like
Density	0.875 g/cm^{3} (at 20 °C)
Melting point	−52 °C (−62 °F; 221 K)
Boiling point	87.50 °C; 189.50 °F; 360.65 K
Solubility in water	Miscible
log P	−1.318
Vapor pressure	5.00 kPa (at 20 °C)
Refractive index (n_{D})	1.4325

Thermochemistry
Heat capacity (C)	134.93 J/(K·mol)
Std molar entropy (S^{⦵}_{298})	165.94 J/(K·mol)
Std enthalpy of formation (Δ_{f}H^{⦵}_{298})	54.14 kJ/mol
Std enthalpy of combustion (Δ_{c}H^{⦵}_{298})	−1305.8 to −1304.6 kJ/mol

Hazards
- Occupational safety and health (OHS/OSH)
Main hazards	highly toxic and reactive liquid
- GHS labelling
Pictograms	(GHS02: Flammable) (GHS06: Toxic) (GHS08: Health hazard) (GHS09: Environmental hazard)
Signal word	Danger
Hazard statements	H225, H300, H301, H311, H314, H330, H351, H411
Precautionary statements	P210, P260, P273, P280, P284
NFPA 704 (fire diamond)	4 3 2
Flash point	−8 °C; 17 °F; 265 K
Autoignition temperature	196 °C (385 °F; 469 K)
Explosive limits	2.5–92%
- Lethal dose or concentration (LD, LC)
LD_{50} (median dose)	32 mg/kg (oral, rat)
LC_{50} (median concentration)	34 ppm (rat, 4 hr); 74 ppm (rat, 4 hr); 162 ppm (monkey, 1 hr); 195 ppm (dog, 30 min); 145 ppm (monkey, 30 min); 272 ppm (mouse, 30 min); 427 ppm (rat, 30 min); 56 ppm (mouse, 4 hr); 143 ppm (hamster, 4 hr)
- NIOSH (US health exposure limits)
PEL (Permissible)	C 0.2 ppm (0.35 mg/m^{3}) [skin]
REL (Recommended)	Ca C 0.04 ppm (0.08 mg/m^{3}) [2-hr]
IDLH (Immediate danger)	Ca [20 ppm]
Safety data sheet (SDS)	inchem.org

Related compounds
Related compounds	Methylamine; Ethylamine; Ethylenediamine
- Except where otherwise noted, data are given for materials in their standard state (at 25 °C [77 °F], 100 kPa). verify (what is ?) Infobox references

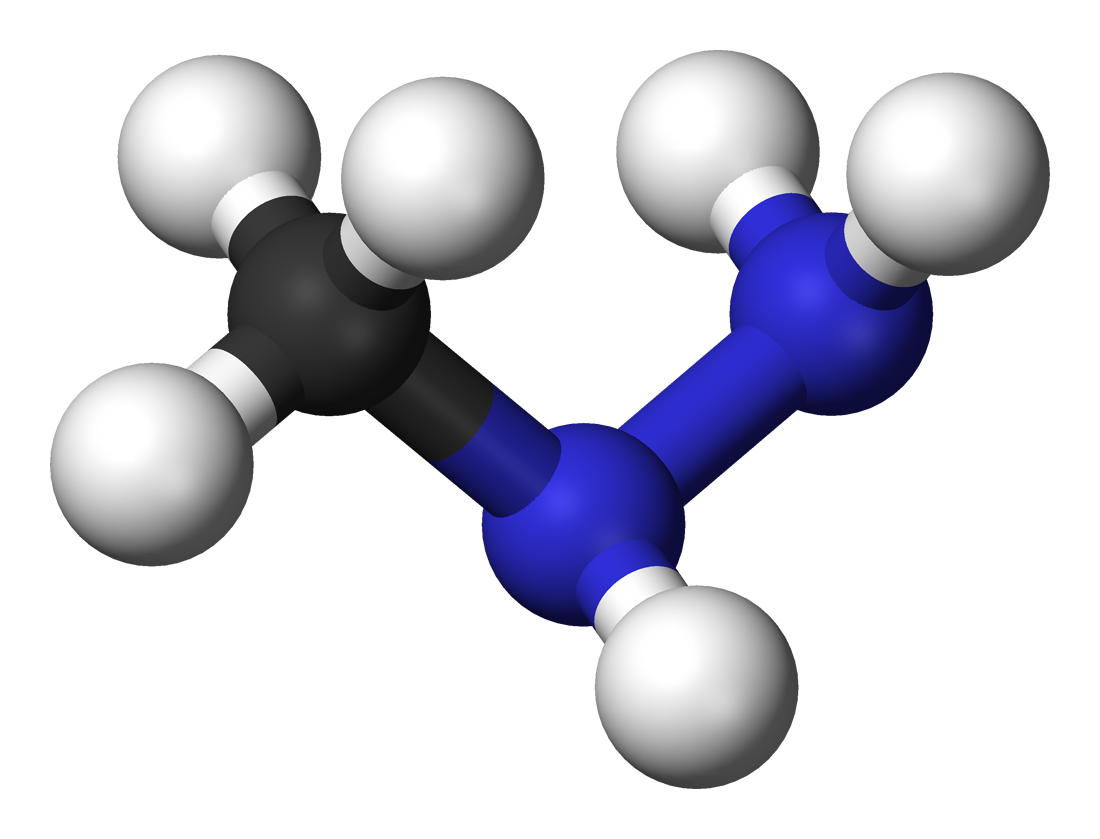

Monomethylhydrazine (MMH) is a highly toxic, volatile hydrazine derivative with the chemical formula CH_{6}N_{2}. It is used as a rocket propellant in bipropellant rocket engines because it is hypergolic with various oxidizers such as nitrogen tetroxide (N_{2}O_{4}) and nitric acid (HNO_{3}). As a propellant, it is described in specification MIL-PRF-27404.

MMH is a hydrazine derivative that was once used in the orbital maneuvering system (OMS) and reaction control system (RCS) engines of NASA's Space Shuttle, which used MMH and MON-3 (a mixture of nitrogen tetroxide with approximately 3% nitric oxide). This chemical is toxic and carcinogenic, but it is easily stored in orbit, providing moderate performance for very low fuel tank system weight. MMH and its chemical relative unsymmetrical dimethylhydrazine (UDMH) have a key advantage that they are stable enough to be used in regeneratively cooled rocket engines. The European Space Agency (ESA) has attempted to seek new options in terms of bipropellant rocket combinations to avoid using toxic chemicals such as MMH and its relatives.

MMH is believed to be the primary active mycotoxin found in the false morel (Gyromitra esculenta). In these cases, MMH is formed by the hydrolysis of gyromitrin.

Monomethylhydrazine is a possible occupational carcinogen, and the occupational exposure limits to MMH are set at protective levels to account for the possible carcinogenicity.

MMH is used in the synthesis of suritozole.

MMH is also assumed to be the active metabolite of temozolomide.
