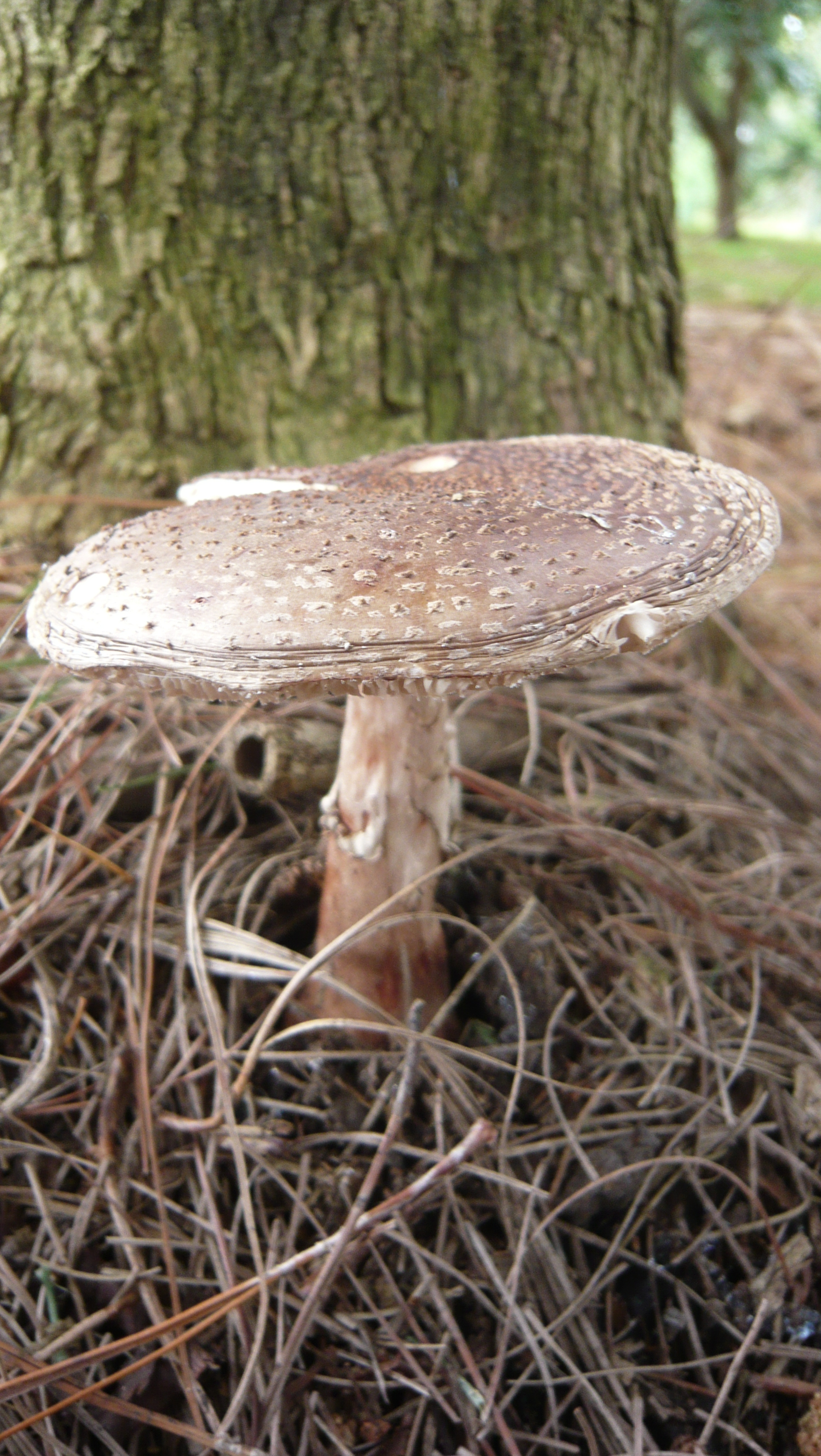

Scientific classification
- Domain: Eukaryota
- Kingdom: Fungi
- Division: Basidiomycota
- Class: Agaricomycetes
- Order: Agaricales
- Family: Amanitaceae
- Genus: Amanita
- Species: A. brunneolocularis

Binomial name
- Amanita brunneolocularis Tulloss, Ovrebo & Halling 1992

= Amanita brunneolocularis =

Species of fungus

Amanita brunneolocularis, also known as the Mesoamerican dark volva blusher, is an uncommon species of Amanita.

== Taxonomy ==
Specimens were found in September 2006 in North Carolina. It was originally thought to be some variety of Amanita rubescens. This was later found to be false, and that this was a complete different species. This new species was named Amanita brunneolocularis.
