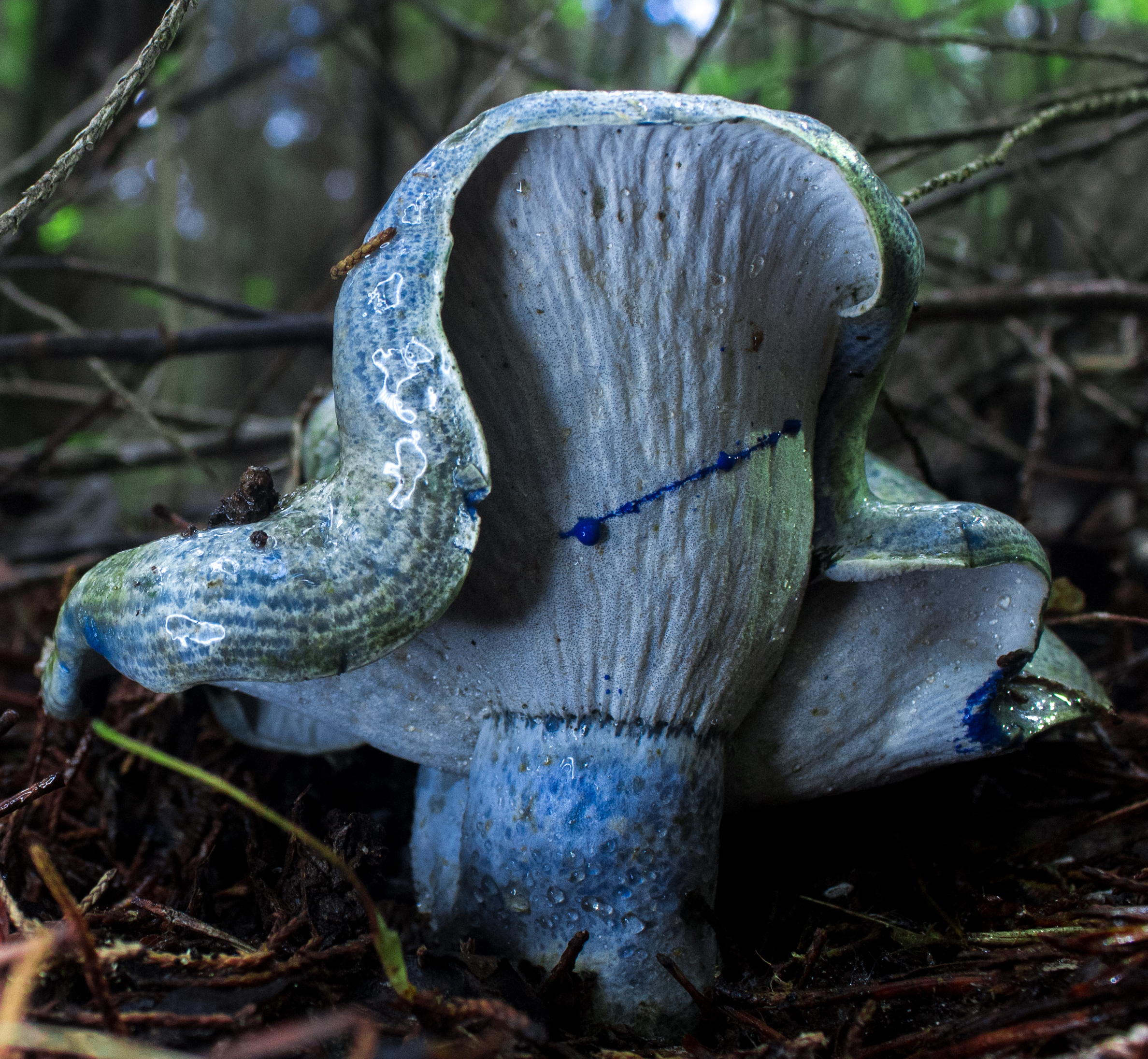
- Hypomyces lateritius on Lactarius indigo (host)

Scientific classification
- Kingdom: Fungi
- Division: Ascomycota
- Class: Sordariomycetes
- Order: Hypocreales
- Family: Hypocreaceae
- Genus: Hypomyces
- Species: H. lateritius

Binomial name
- Hypomyces lateritius (Fr.) Tul. & C.Tul. (1860)

Synonyms
- Sphaeria lateritia Fr. (1823)

= Hypomyces lateritius =

Species of edible parasitic fungus

Hypomyces lateritius, the ochre gillgobbler, is a parasitic ascomycete fungus that grows on certain species of Lactarius mushrooms, improving their flavor and densifying the flesh. Hosts include L. camphoratus, L. chelidonium, L. controversus, L. deliciosus, L. indigo, L. rufus, L. salmonicolor, L. sanguifluus, L. semisanguifluus, L. tabidus, L. trivialis, and L. vinosus.

It is a microscopic fungus causing the formation of a macroscopic whitish subiculum over the hymenium of its host species, preventing gill formation. Presence of H. lateritius also often deforms the cap and stipe. Parasitization by H. lateritius does not prevent latex from forming when the flesh is cut.

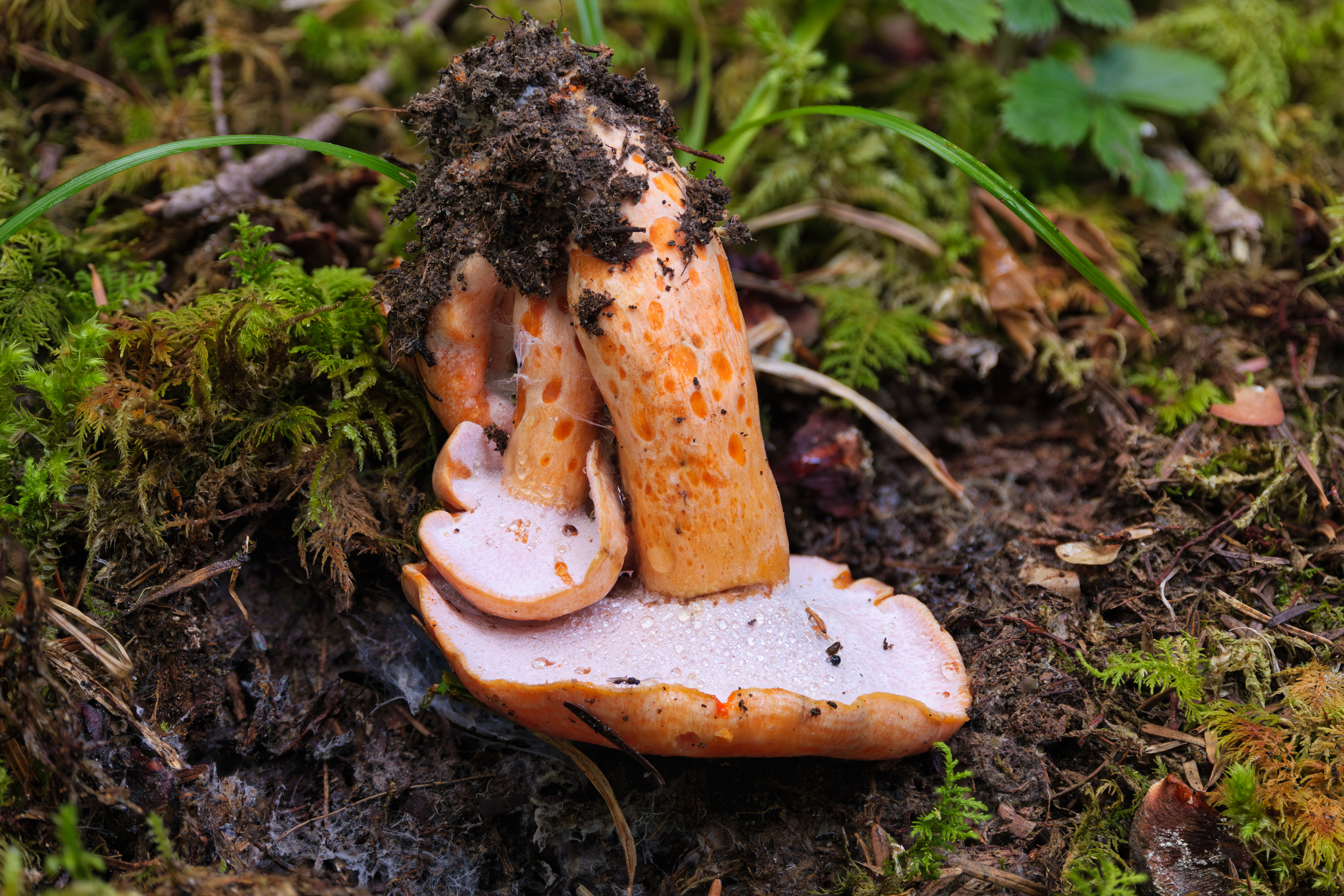
Lactarius salmonicolor infected with Hypomyces lateritius

== Distribution ==
Hypomyces lateritius can be found wherever Lactarius species can be found, in North America from Alaska to Mexico and in Europe from the Iberian Peninsula to Ukraine. In Asia in Kazakhstan, Kyrgyzstan and Western Siberia. It has also been reported in New Zealand and South Africa.

== Synonyms ==
- Sphaeria lateritia Fries, Syst. Mycol. 2: 338. 1823.
- Hypocrea lateritia (Fr.) Fries, Summa Veg. Scand. 383.1849.
- Peckiella lateritia (Fr.) Maire, Ann. Mycol. 4: 331.1906.
- Byssonectria lateritia (Fr.) Petch, J. Bot. Lond. 75: 220.1937.
- Hypomyces volemi Peck, Bull. Torrey Club 27: 20. 1900.
- Peckiella hymenioides Peck, Bull. Torrey Club 34: 102.1907.
- Hypomyces camphorati Peck, New York State Bull. 205:23. 1905 (1906).
- Peckiella camphorati (Peck) Seaver, Mycologia 2: 68.1910.
- Hypomyces camphorati (syn. Peckiella camphorati) is sometimes treated as a separate species from H. lateritius. Subiculum of specimens with L. camphoratus host tends more yellowish, and displays slightly larger ascospores. More research is required to determine whether H. lateritius is a single species or a species complex.
