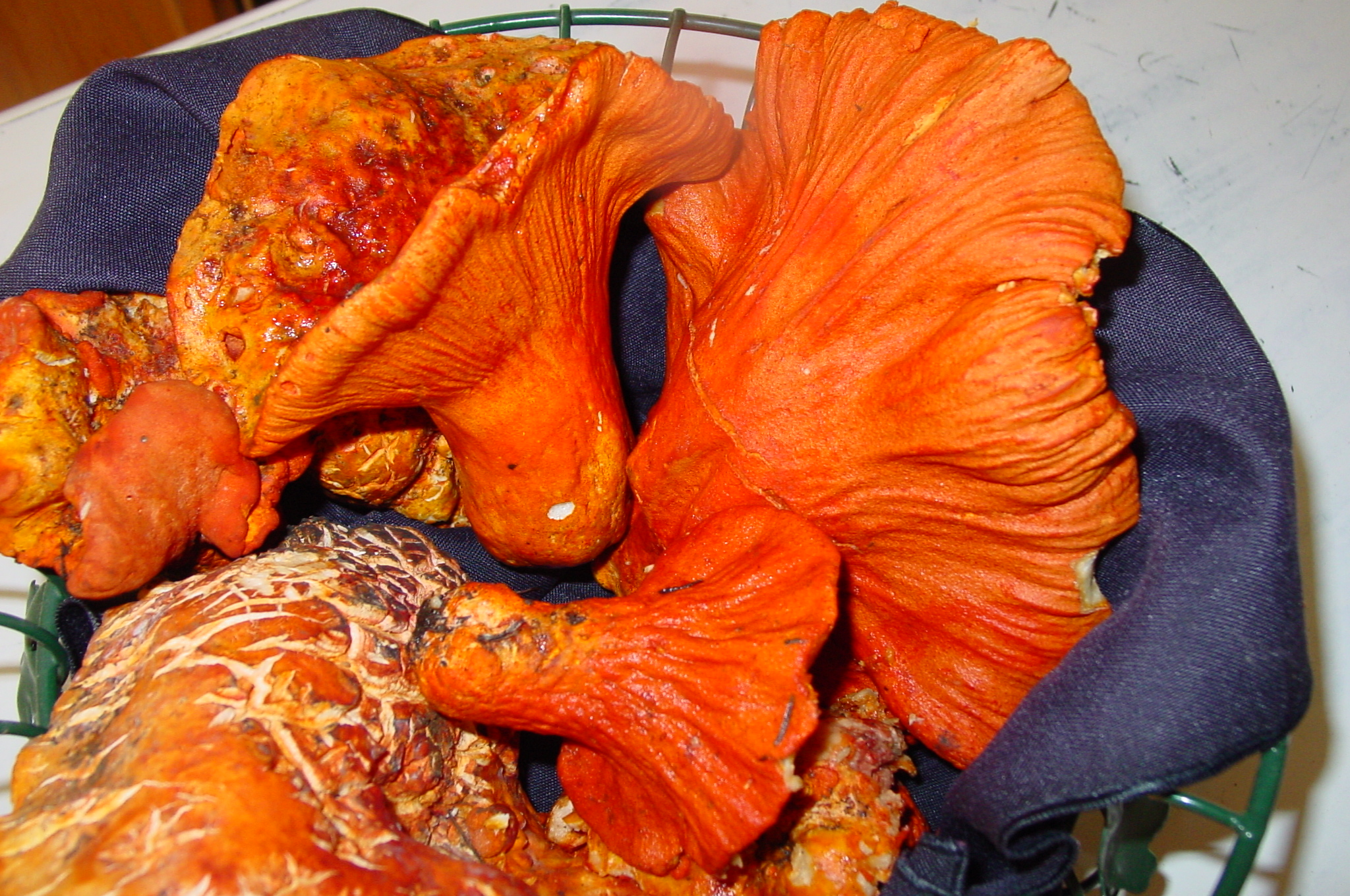

Scientific classification
- Kingdom: Fungi
- Division: Ascomycota
- Class: Sordariomycetes
- Order: Hypocreales
- Family: Hypocreaceae
- Genus: Hypomyces
- Species: H. lactifluorum

Binomial name
- Hypomyces lactifluorum (Schwein.) Tul. & C.Tul.

= Hypomyces lactifluorum =

Species of edible parasitic fungus

Hypomyces lactifluorum
- Mycological characteristics
- Smooth hymenium
- Hymenium is decurrent
- Stipe is bare
- Spore print is white
- Ecology is parasitic
- Edibility is choice

Hypomyces lactifluorum, the lobster mushroom, is a parasitic ascomycete fungus that grows on certain species of mushrooms, turning them a reddish orange color that resembles the outer shell of a cooked lobster. The fungus is edible.

== Taxonomy ==
The common name 'lobster mushroom' refers to the visual similarity of affected species to the lobster, but Hypomyces lactifluorum is not in fact a mushroom; it is a parasite that attacks them.

== Description ==
Hypomyces lactifluorum specifically attacks members of the genera Lactarius and Lactifluus (milk-caps), as well as Russula (brittlegills), such as Russula brevipes and Lactifluus piperatus in North America. At maturity, the reddish orange H. lactifluorum thoroughly covers its host, rendering it unidentifiable. As it ages, its color can go from the entire sporocarp surface and lamella to the margin of the mushroom.

The species produces a white spore print.

=== Similar species ===
Similar species include Hypomyces cervinigenus, H. chrysospermus, and H. luteovirens. Turbinellus floccosus has a similarly colored cap, but its underside has fine wrinkles rather than wavy gills. White, pink, and yellow molds could be toxic lookalike species.

== Distribution and habitat ==
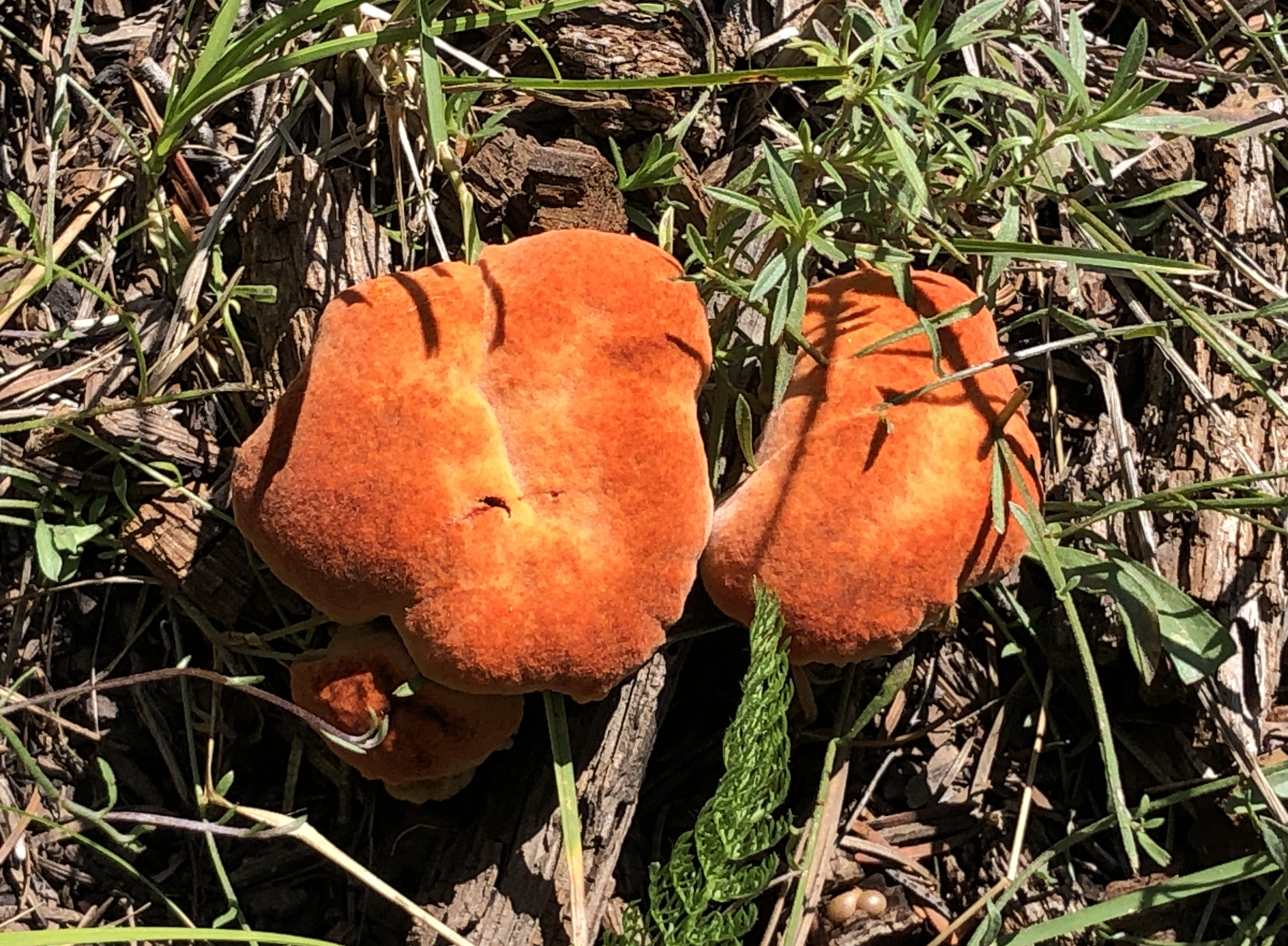
Hypomyces lactifluorum in the Jemez Mountains, New Mexico

Hypomyces lactifluorum is found in wooded areas, often near Russula brevipes or Lactarius growing in conifer forests, in particular under ponderosa pine in the American Southwest and the Pacific Northwest. Its range in the woods has been described as "solitary, scattered or gregarious" depending on location.

== Uses ==
Lobster mushrooms are widely eaten and enjoyed freshly foraged and cooked. They are commercially marketed and sometimes found in grocery stores; they have been made available at markets in Oregon. They have a seafood-like flavor and a firm, dense texture.

While edible, field guides note the hypothetical possibility that H. lactifluorum could parasitize a toxic host and that individuals should avoid consuming lobster mushrooms with unknown hosts, although no instances of toxicity have been recorded. During the course of infection, the chemicals get converted into other more flavorful compounds, making lobster mushrooms more edible. Lactarius piperatus has a spicy, hot flavor but that flavor is counteracted by the parasite H. lactifluorum, making it more edible and delicious. One author notes that he has personally never experienced any trouble from consuming them and another notes that there have been no reports of poisoning in hundreds of years of consumption.

=== Research ===
A study from Quebec found that an infected R. brevipes mushroom mostly contained lobster mushroom DNA, with only trace amounts from the original species. This study also measured intermediate products of chemical reactions, or metabolites, in infected and non-infected mushrooms. Metabolites help determine how fungi look and taste, and whether they are fit to eat. They found that through the course of its infection, the parasitic fungus completely alters the diversity and amount of metabolites in R. brevipes.
