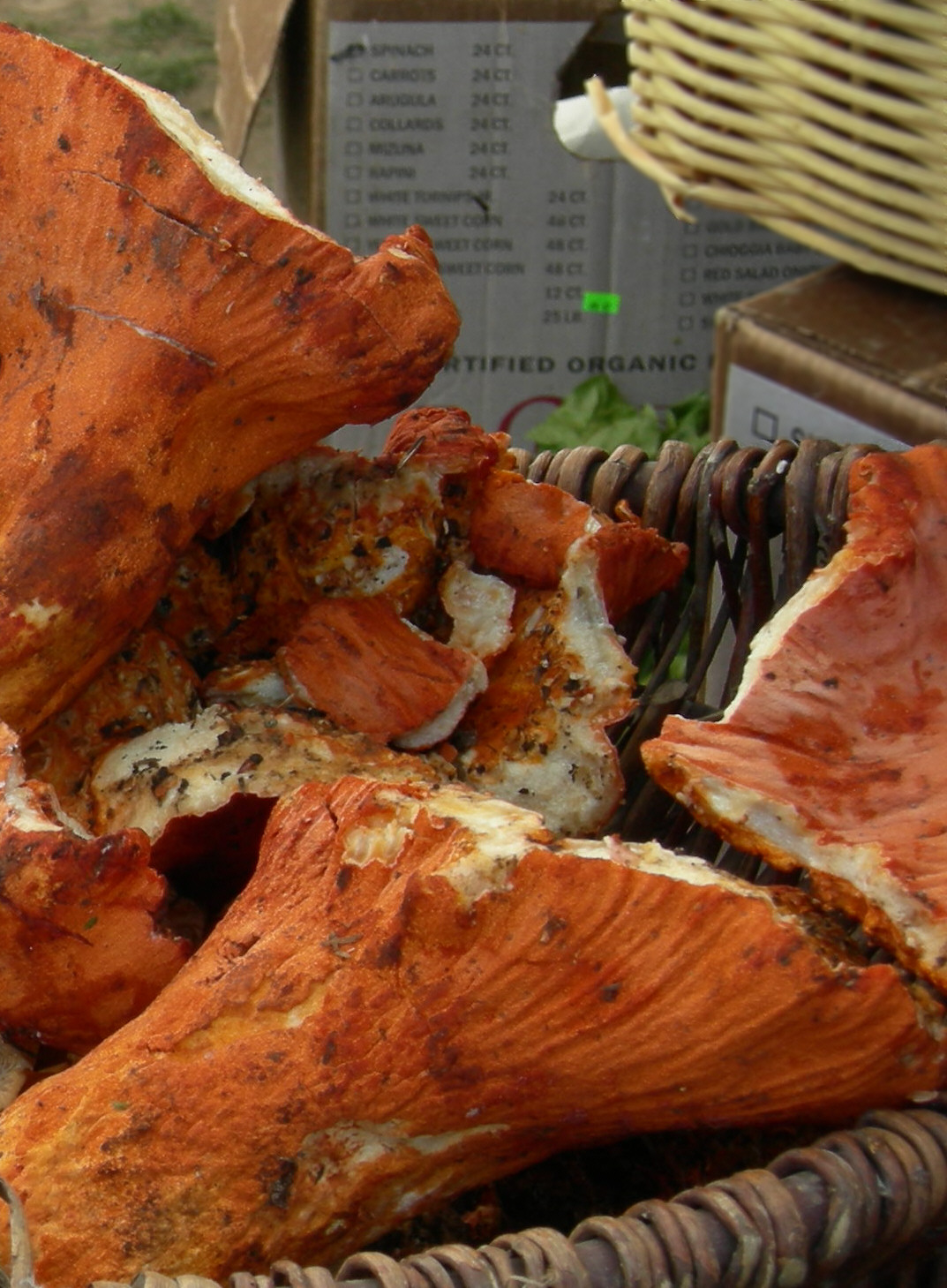
- Hypomyces lactifluorum

Scientific classification
- Kingdom: Fungi
- Division: Ascomycota
- Class: Sordariomycetes
- Order: Hypocreales
- Family: Hypocreaceae
- Genus: Hypomyces (Fr.) Tul. & C. Tul. (1860)

Type species
- Hypomyces lactifluorum (Schwein.) Tul. & C. Tul.

= Hypomyces =

Genus of fungi

Hypomyces is a genus of parasitic ascomycete fungi found in Europe, North America, Australia, and parts of China. The genus contains 53 species. Better known species include the lobster mushroom (Hypomyces lactifluorum) and the bolete eater (Hypomyces chrysospermus).

== List of noteworthy species ==
- H. cervinigenus – on Helvella lacunosa.
- H. chrysospermus – Bolete Eater, Cask fungus (Eurasia, Western Australia, North America)
- H. hyalinus – Amanita "mold" (North America)
- H. lactifluorum – Lobster mushroom (North America)
- H. lateritius – Ochre gillgobbler, pathogen of Lactarius species.
- H. luteovirens – Green langoustine, Yellow-green Russula "mold" (North America)
- H. transformans – Ramaria Eater (North America)

== Ecology ==
All Hypomyces species live as parasites on other fungi. The fruiting bodies of hypomyces are inconspicuous and generally consist of a cystic shell that is only about 1 mm in diameter and height. These fruiting bodies often cluster on the fruiting bodies of other host fungi, transforming the shape and color of the host into something different from the host's original appearance. The most commonly recognized form is the one in which the host's fruiting body is integrated with the cystic shell of the hypomyces.

== Shape ==
The individual fungi bodies are finely grained, and many of them exhibit long, narrow ellipsoids under magnification. Their diameter and height are usually about 1 to 2 mm. In general, hyphae are spread on the surface of a host fruit body and buried in the mycelium to form a large number of fruiting bodies. These can be yellow, white, olive, tan, pink or red, and present within the host or in the hypha mat.

The individual fruiting bodies are microscopically granular, and under a magnifying glass, many of them show elongated ellipsoid shapes, and are usually only 1–2 mm in diameter and height. Generally, hyphae are spread on the surface of a host fruiting body and buried in the mycelium to form a large number of fruiting bodies. The color of the fruiting bodies themselves or the mycelial mat covering the host surface can be yellow, white, olive, yellowish brown, pink, or red. Countless of asci form inside each fruiting body, which are then ejected into the outside world through the hole at the tip of the fruiting body.

The asci formed inside the fruiting body is elongated and cylindrical, with a dome-shaped structure called the "apical cap" at the tip. Eight spores are formed inside each ascus. The spores are generally somewhat angular and ellipsoid, and in many species are separated by a single septum, usually colorless to pale yellow, with thick cell walls and wart-like or bump-like patterns on the surface. Some species have horn-shaped or cap-shaped "appendages" at both ends of the spores.

== Life cycle ==
Most species reproduce asexually. Asexual regeneration spores are generally referred to as thick-wall spores, as they have thick cell walls presumably to maintain a system of dormancy and endurance. However, the precise mechanisms of spore reproduction, specifically the methods used to find and infest hosts is largely unknown.

== Hosts ==
Each species of fungus in the genus Hypomyces has a general preference for the type of host it prefers.

In addition to afflicting terrestrial mushrooms of the genera Amanita, Russula, Lactarius, Lactifluus, Suillus, Xerocomus, and Boletus, other fungi that form hard, cork-like fruiting bodies on trees, such as Trametes and Stereum, can also serve as hosts.

Auricularia auricula-judae that produce colloidal fruiting bodies, and Pezizaceae belonging to the ascomycote fungi (e.g., Helvella, Humaria, and Leotia) are also known to serve as hosts.

When infected by Hypomyces, the cap, or pileus of Amanita mushrooms do not develop properly, instead becoming deformed and stunted, often resembling human male genitalia. In those of the genus Russula, the gaps between the folds of the host's lamella are filled with mycelium of Hypomyces, showing ridged marks. In the genera Xerocomus, and Boletus, the development of the mushroom cap is often suppressed and the tubular pores formed on the underside of the host's lamellae are also filled with mycelium of Hypomyces. In any case, the host mushroom's own spore formation and dispersal are hindered, or entirely prevented from occurring.

== Distribution ==
Species of Hypomyces range from North America and Eurasia into Australia. There are at least 19 species recorded in Japan.

== Edibility ==
Hypomyces lactifluorum, whose main hosts are mushrooms of the genera Russula and Lactifluus, is commonly called lobster mushroom in North America and United Kingdom. Depending on the type of mushroom that was parasitized, the cap may be very bitter, and in some cases inedible. If edible, it is often eaten stewed in cream sauce, fried, as a salad ingredient, or as an ingredient in pasta dishes. This species is also found in Japan.

== Other species ==
- Hypomyces agaricola
- Hypomyces albidus
- Hypomyces albus
- Hypomyces amaurodermatis
- Hypomyces apiculatus
- Hypomyces apiosporus
- Hypomyces arachnoideus
- Hypomyces arecae
- Hypomyces arenaceus
- Hypomyces armeniacus
- Hypomyces asclepiadis
- Hypomyces ater
- Hypomyces aurantiicolor
- Hypomyces aurantius
- Hypomyces auriculariicola
- Hypomyces australbidus
- Hypomyces australiensis
- Hypomyces australis
- Hypomyces badius
- Hypomyces banningiae
- Hypomyces batavus
- Hypomyces biasolettianus
- Hypomyces boleticola
- Hypomyces boletinus
- Hypomyces boletiphagus
- Hypomyces bombacinus
- Hypomyces bresadolae
- Hypomyces bresadolanus
- Hypomyces camphorati
- Hypomyces caulicola
- Hypomyces cervinigenus
- Hypomyces cervinus
- Hypomyces cesatii
- Hypomyces chlorinigenus
- Hypomyces chlorinus
- Hypomyces chromaticus
- Hypomyces chrysospermus
- Hypomyces completus
- Hypomyces conviva
- Hypomyces corticiicola
- Hypomyces dactylarioides
- Hypomyces deformans
- Hypomyces destruens-equi
- Hypomyces ekmanii
- Hypomyces epimyces
- Hypomyces favoli
- Hypomyces flavescens
- Hypomyces flavolanatus
- Hypomyces floccosus
- Hypomyces fulgens
- Hypomyces fusisporus
- Hypomyces galericola
- Hypomyces goroshankianus
- Hypomyces hrubyanus
- Hypomyces hyacinthi
- Hypomyces hyalinus
- Hypomyces inaequalis
- Hypomyces insignis
- Hypomyces javanicus
- Hypomyces khaoyaiensis
- Hypomyces lactifluorum
- Hypomyces laeticolor
- Hypomyces lateritius
- Hypomyces leotiarum
- Hypomyces leotiicola
- Hypomyces linearis
- Hypomyces linkii
- Hypomyces lithuanicus
- Hypomyces macrosporus
- Hypomyces melanocarpus
- Hypomyces melanochlorus
- Hypomyces melanostigma
- Hypomyces microspermus
- Hypomyces miliarius
- Hypomyces mycogones
- Hypomyces mycophilus
- Hypomyces niveus
- Hypomyces novae-zelandiae
- Hypomyces ochraceus
- Hypomyces odoratus
- Hypomyces orthosporus
- Hypomyces paeonius
- Hypomyces pallidus
- Hypomyces pannosus
- Hypomyces papulasporae
- Hypomyces papyraceus
- Hypomyces parvisporus
- Hypomyces parvus
- Hypomyces penicillatus
- Hypomyces pergamenus
- Hypomyces perniciosus
- Hypomyces petchii
- Hypomyces pezizae
- Hypomyces polyporinus
- Hypomyces porphyreus
- Hypomyces pseudocorticiicola
- Hypomyces pseudopolyporinus
- Hypomyces psiloti
- Hypomyces puertoricensis
- Hypomyces purpureus
- Hypomyces robledoi
- Hypomyces rosellus
- Hypomyces rostratus
- Hypomyces rubi
- Hypomyces semitranslucens
- Hypomyces sepulchralis
- Hypomyces sepultariae
- Hypomyces siamensis
- Hypomyces sibirinae
- Hypomyces spadiceus
- Hypomyces stephanomatis
- Hypomyces stereicola
- Hypomyces stuhlmannii
- Hypomyces subaurantius
- Hypomyces subiculosus
- Hypomyces succineus
- Hypomyces sulphureus
- Hypomyces sympodiophorus
- Hypomyces tegillum
- Hypomyces terrestris
- Hypomyces thailandicus
- Hypomyces thiryanus
- Hypomyces tomentosus
- Hypomyces torminosus
- Hypomyces transformans
- Hypomyces trichoderma
- Hypomyces triseptatus
- Hypomyces tubericola
- Hypomyces tuberosus
- Hypomyces tulasneanus
- Hypomyces vanbruntianus
- Hypomyces vandae
- Hypomyces villosus
- Hypomyces viridigriseus
- Hypomyces viridis
- Hypomyces volemi
- Hypomyces vuilleminianus
- Hypomyces xyloboli
- Hypomyces xylophilus
