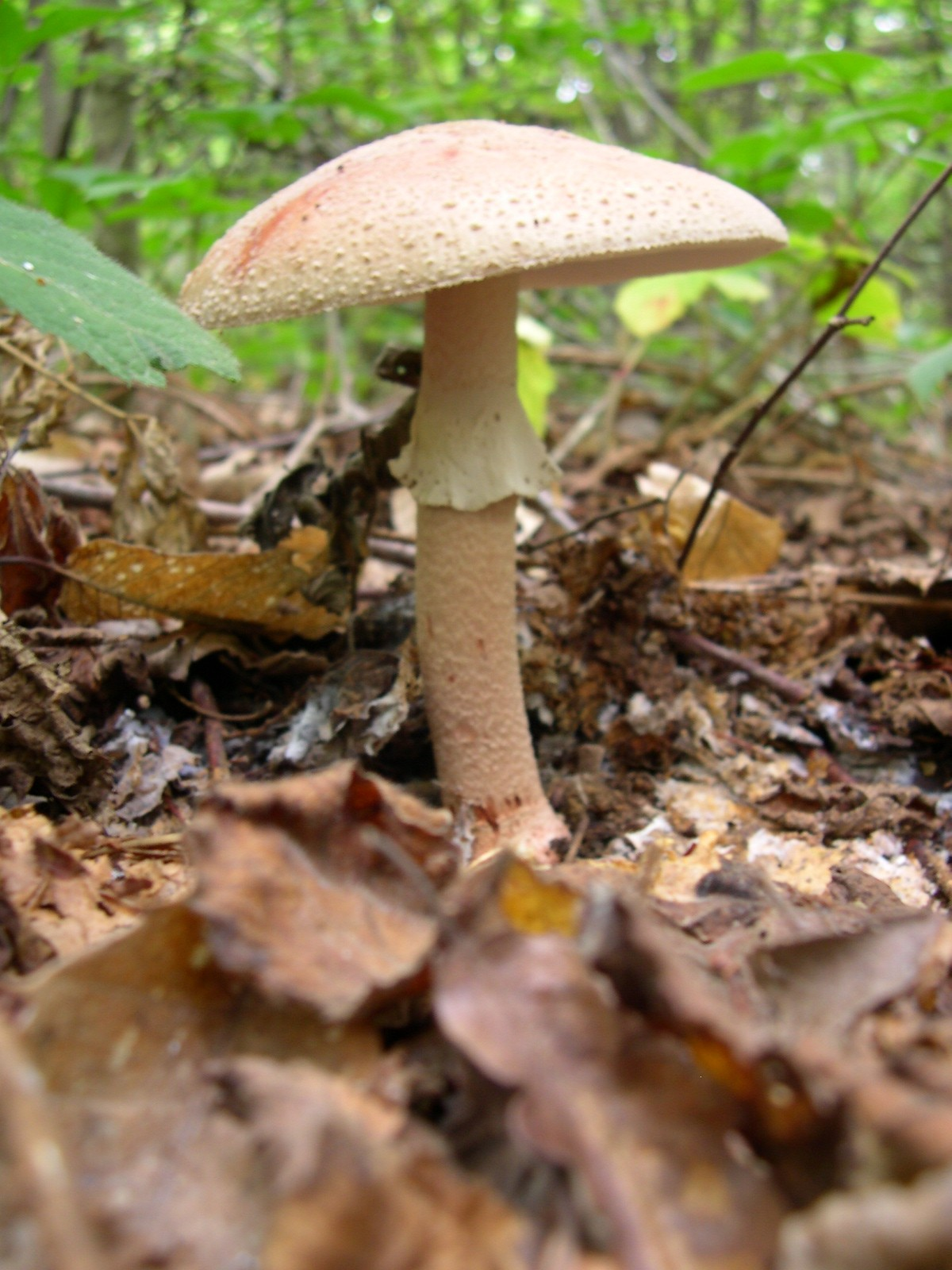
- Amanita rubescens in Piacenza, Italy; visible near the top of the cap is an example of the pink bruising which gives the species its common name

Scientific classification
- Kingdom: Fungi
- Division: Basidiomycota
- Class: Agaricomycetes
- Order: Agaricales
- Family: Amanitaceae
- Genus: Amanita
- Species: A. rubescens

Binomial name
- Amanita rubescens (Pers. ex Fr.) Gray

= Blusher =

Species of fungus

Amanita rubescens
- Mycological characteristics
- Gills on hymenium
- Cap is flat
- Hymenium is free
- Stipe has a ring
- Spore print is white
- Ecology is mycorrhizal
- Edibility is edible but not recommended

The blusher is the common name for several closely related species of the genus Amanita. A. rubescens (the blushing amanita) is found in Eurasia, North America, Australia, and Africa. A. novinupta (the new bride blushing amanita or blushing bride) is found in western North America. Both their scientific and common names stem from the tendency of their flesh to bruise pink.

Blushers are difficult to distinguish from similar species, but one identifying feature is the pink bruising. This mushroom is edible if cooked, but poisonous raw.

== Taxonomy ==
Amanita rubescens is native to Europe and Asia. Amanita novinupta can be found in western North America.

Other closely related species and variants include Amanita brunneolocularis, A. orsonii, A. rubescens var. alba, and A. rubescens var. congolensis.

== Description ==
A. rubescens has a reddish-brown convex pileus (cap), which is 5–15 centimetres (2–6 inches) across, and strewn with small white-to-mahogany warts. It is sometimes covered with an ochre-yellow flush which can be washed by the rain. The flesh of the mushroom is white, becoming pink when bruised or exposed to air. The stipe (stem) is white with flushes of the cap colour, and grows to 5–15 cm. The gills are white and free of the stem, and display red spots when damaged. The ring is striate (i.e. has ridges) on its upper side. The spores are white, ovate, amyloid, and approximately 8 by 5 μm in size. The flavour of the uncooked flesh is mild, but has a faint acrid aftertaste. The smell is not strong.

A. novinupta has a whitish cap 5–15 cm wide and stem up to 12 cm long. It also blushes pink and has a mild smell and white spore print.

=== Similar species ===
Several related species are difficult to distinguish. The pink blush is a key feature in differentiating blushers from A. pantherina (the poisonous false blusher), the flesh of which does not.A. pantherina also lacks a striate ring.

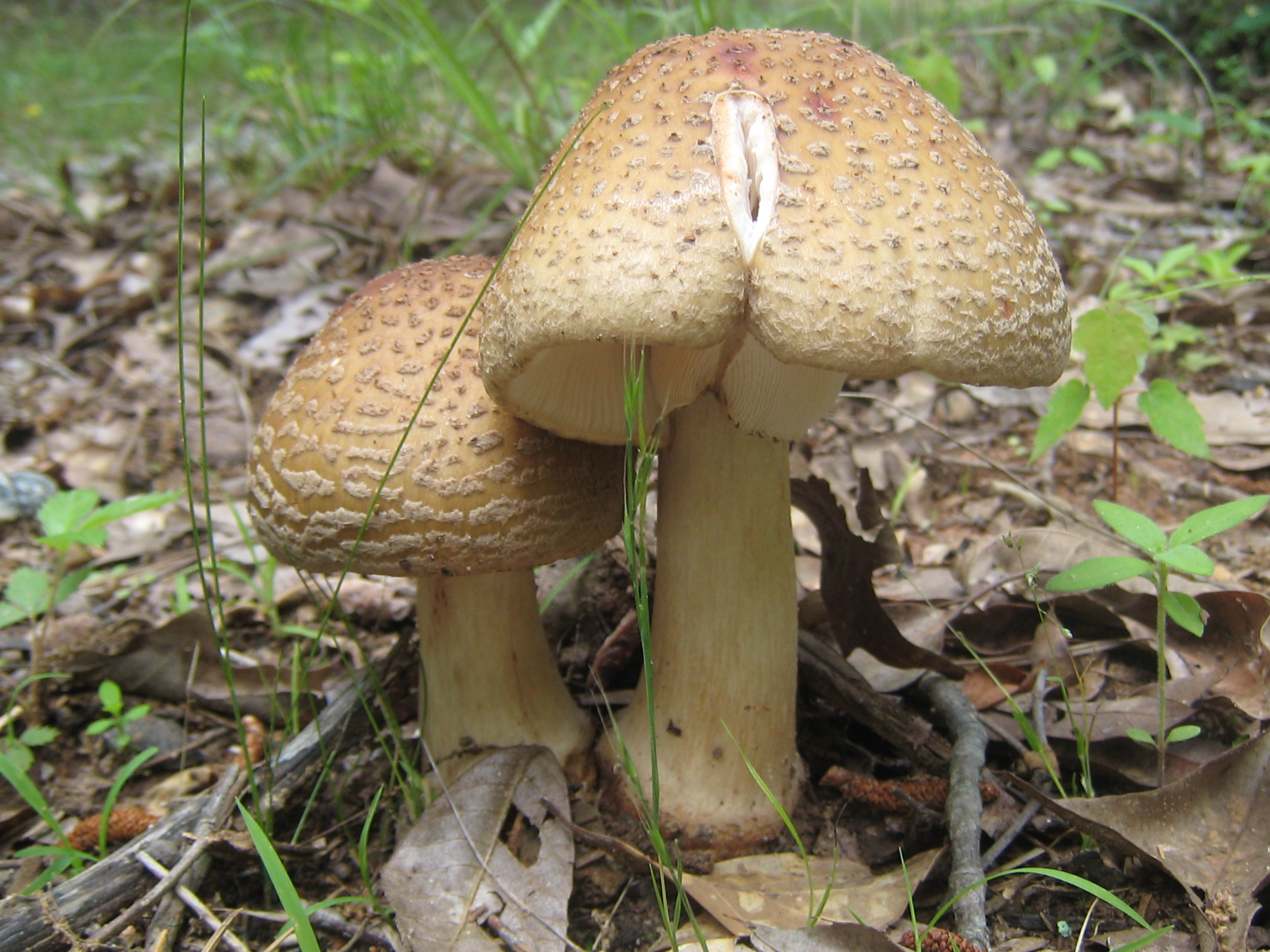
Amanita 'amerirubescens'

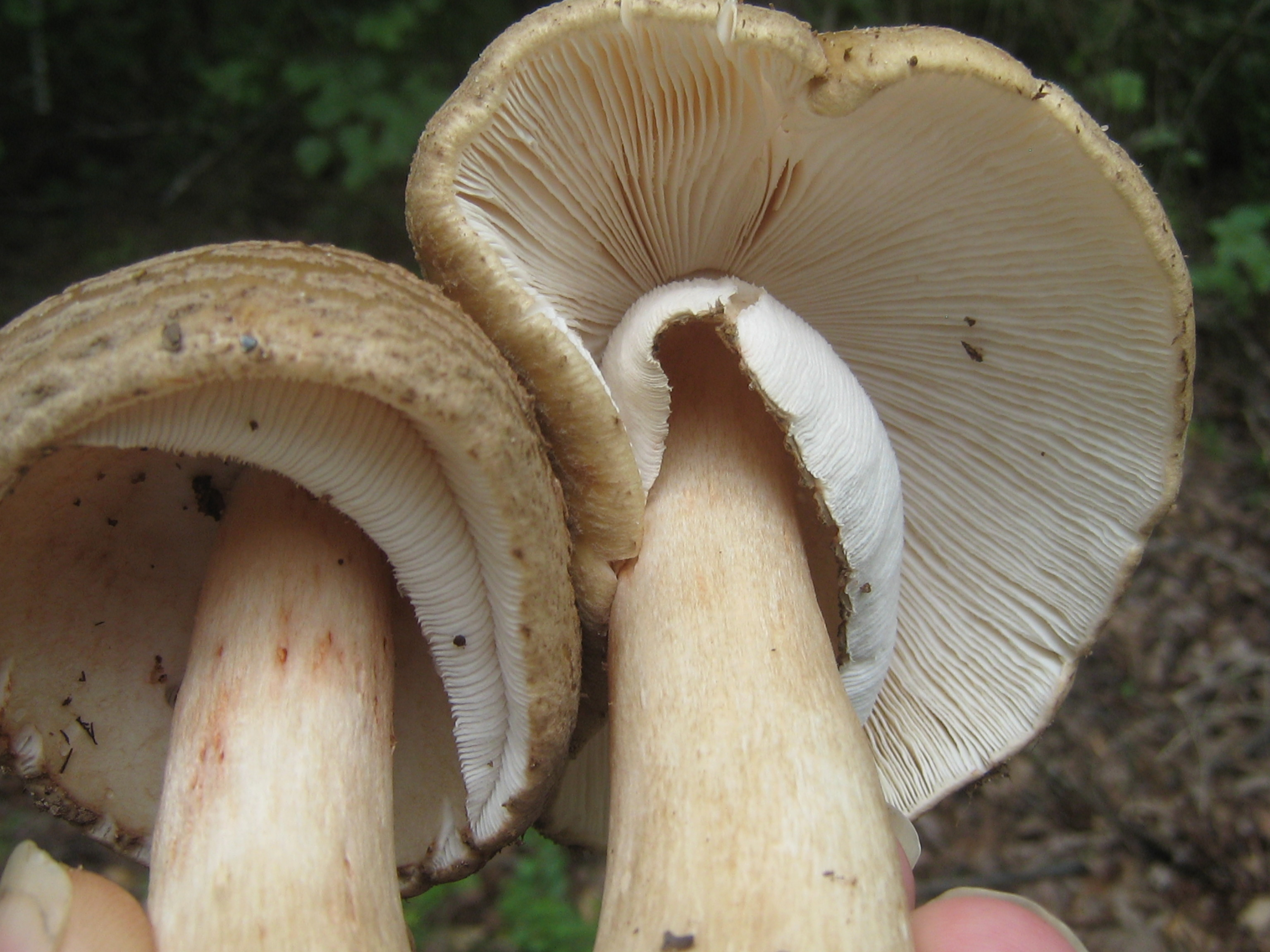
Underside of A. 'amerirubescens'

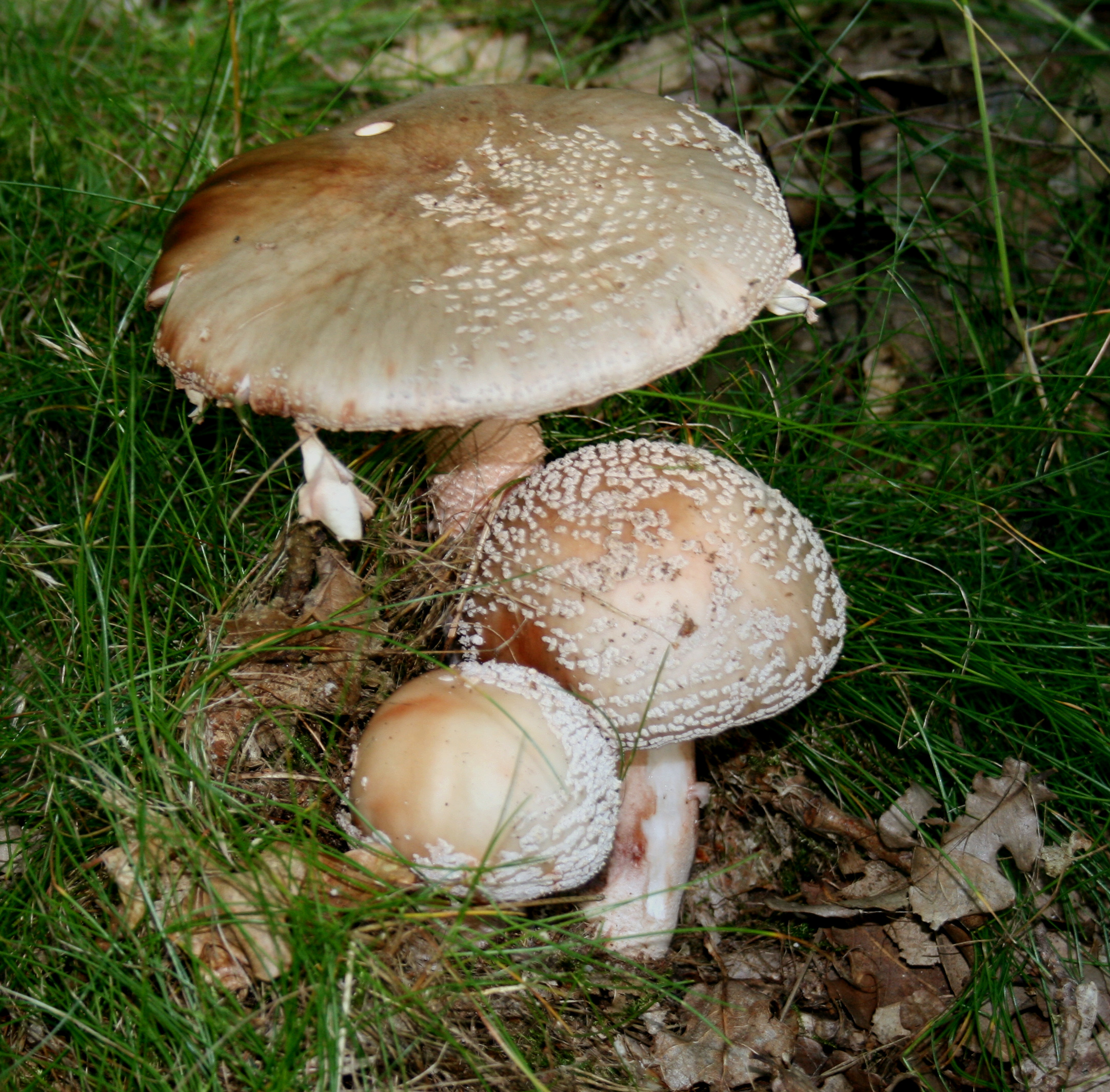
Blushers at various ages

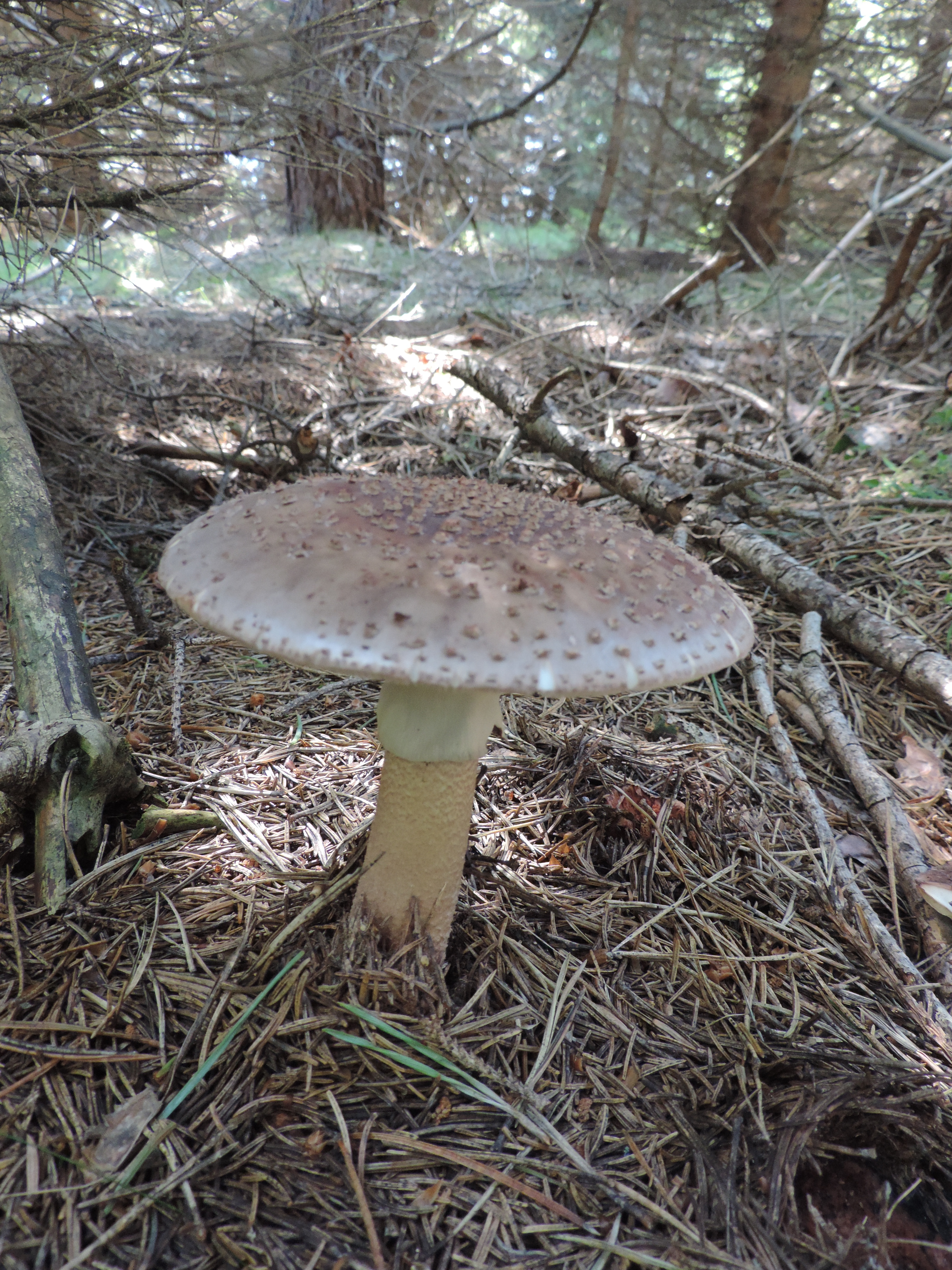
A. rubescens

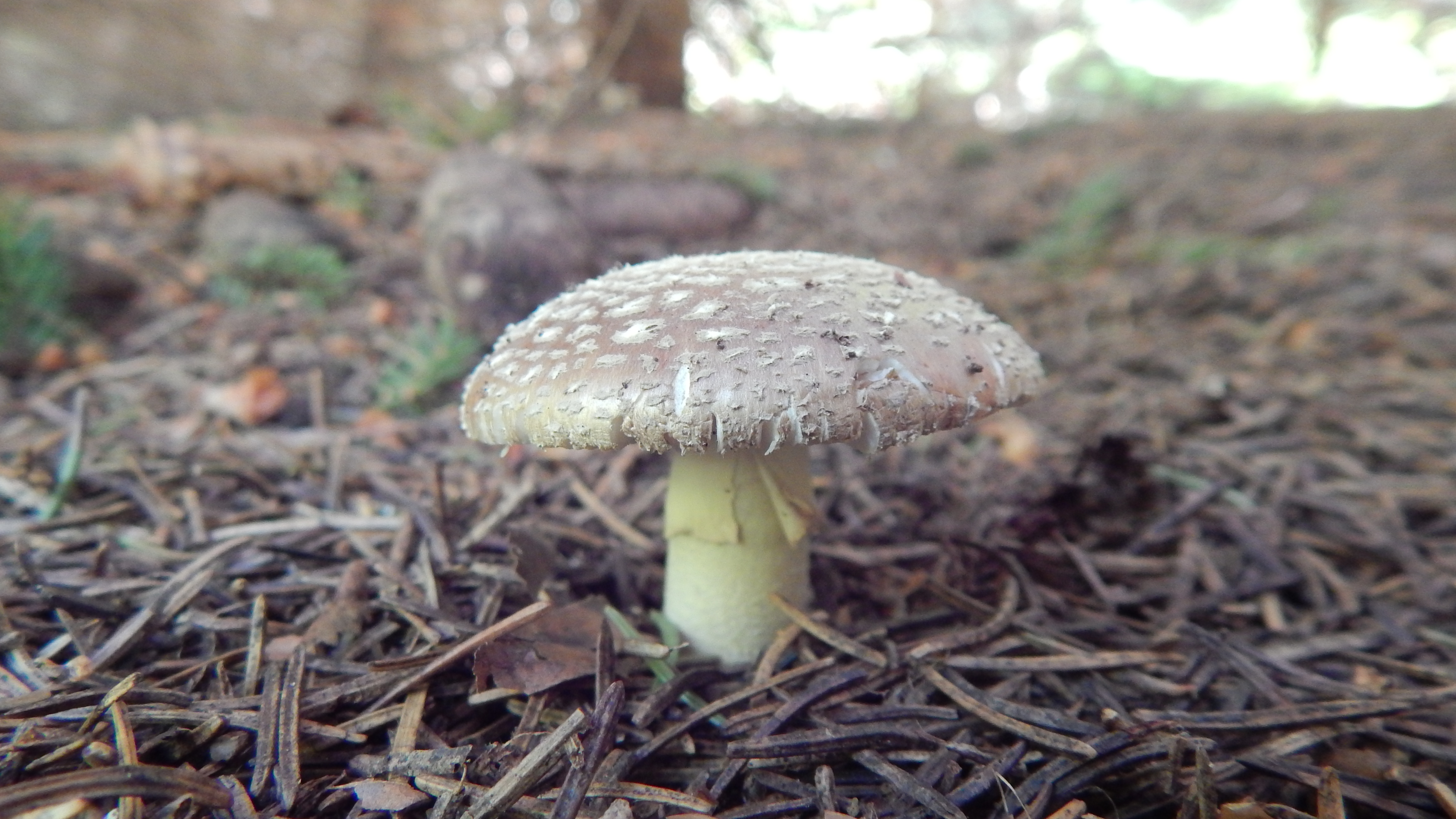
A. rubescens f. annulosulphurea

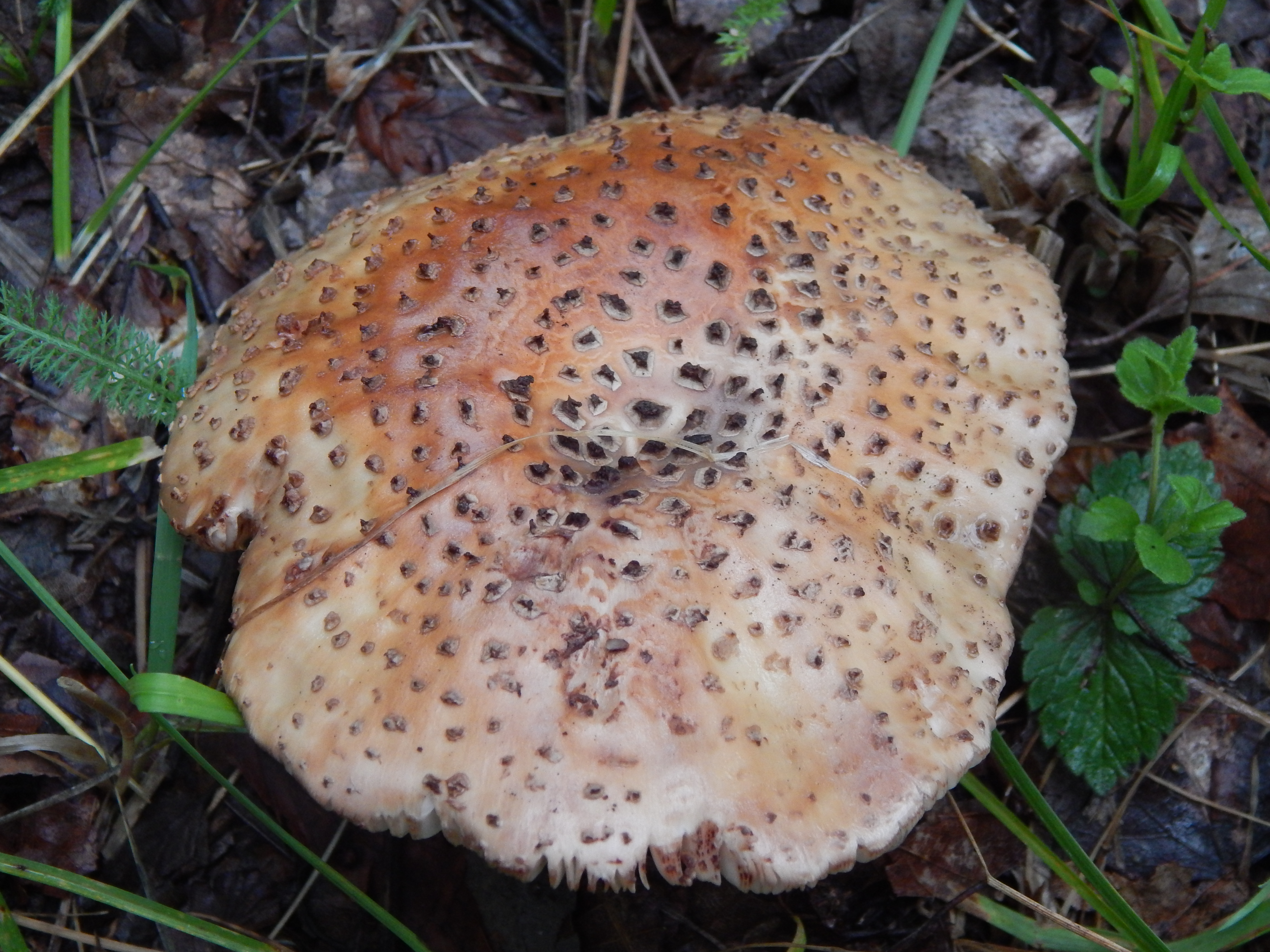
A. rubescens cap

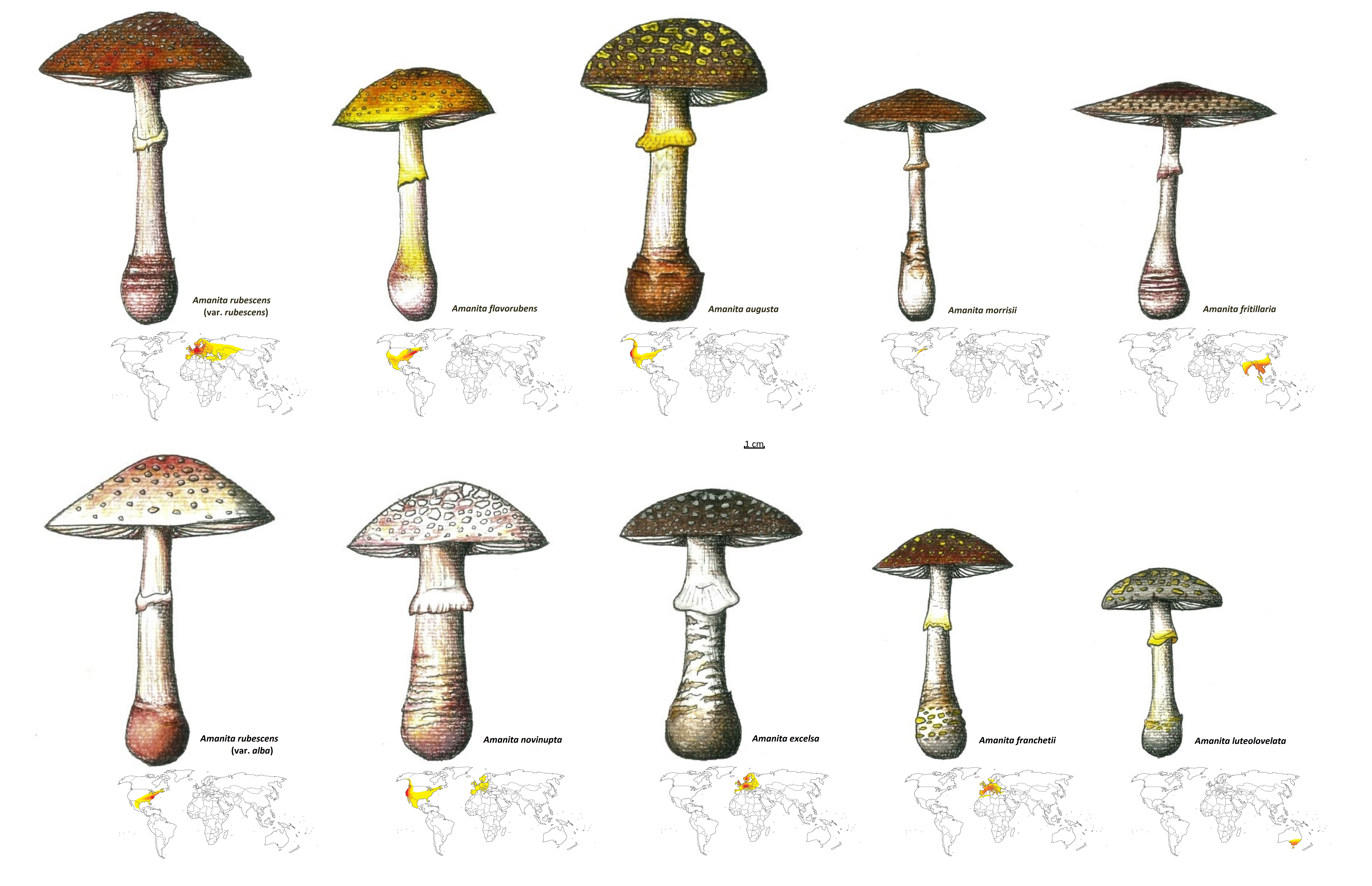
Illustration of A. rubescens group

== Distribution and habitat ==
A. rubescens is common throughout much of Europe and Asia. It grows on poor soils as well as in deciduous and coniferous woodlands, appearing from June through to November in the United Kingdom. It has also been recorded from South Africa, where it is thought to have been accidentally introduced with trees imported from Europe. Other regions where it occurs includes Russia, Japan, Australia, Canada, and the United States.

A. novinupta is found in western North America, especially California. Additionally, there are several North American species known as A. amerirubescens.

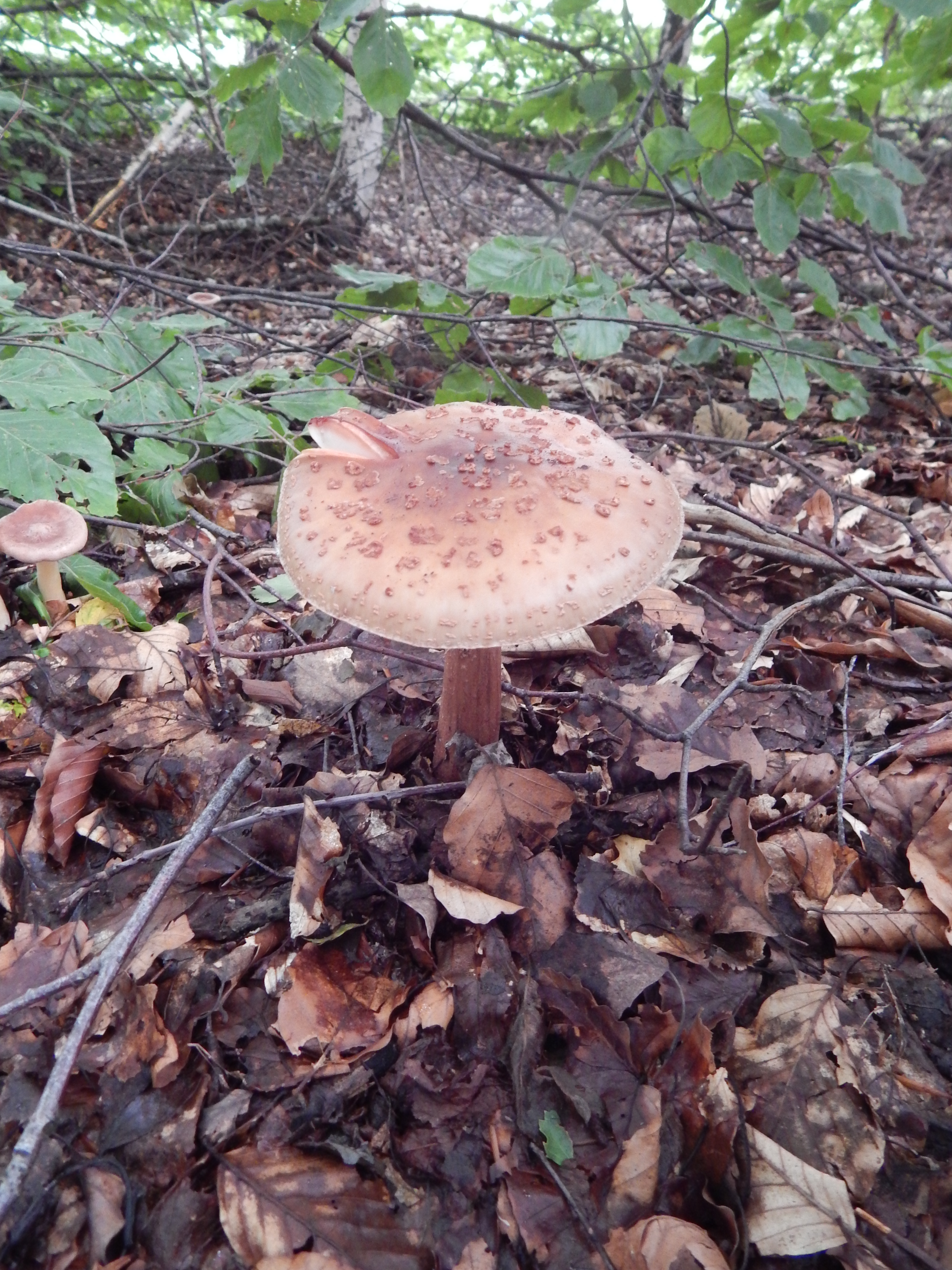
Amanita rubescens in deciduous woodland

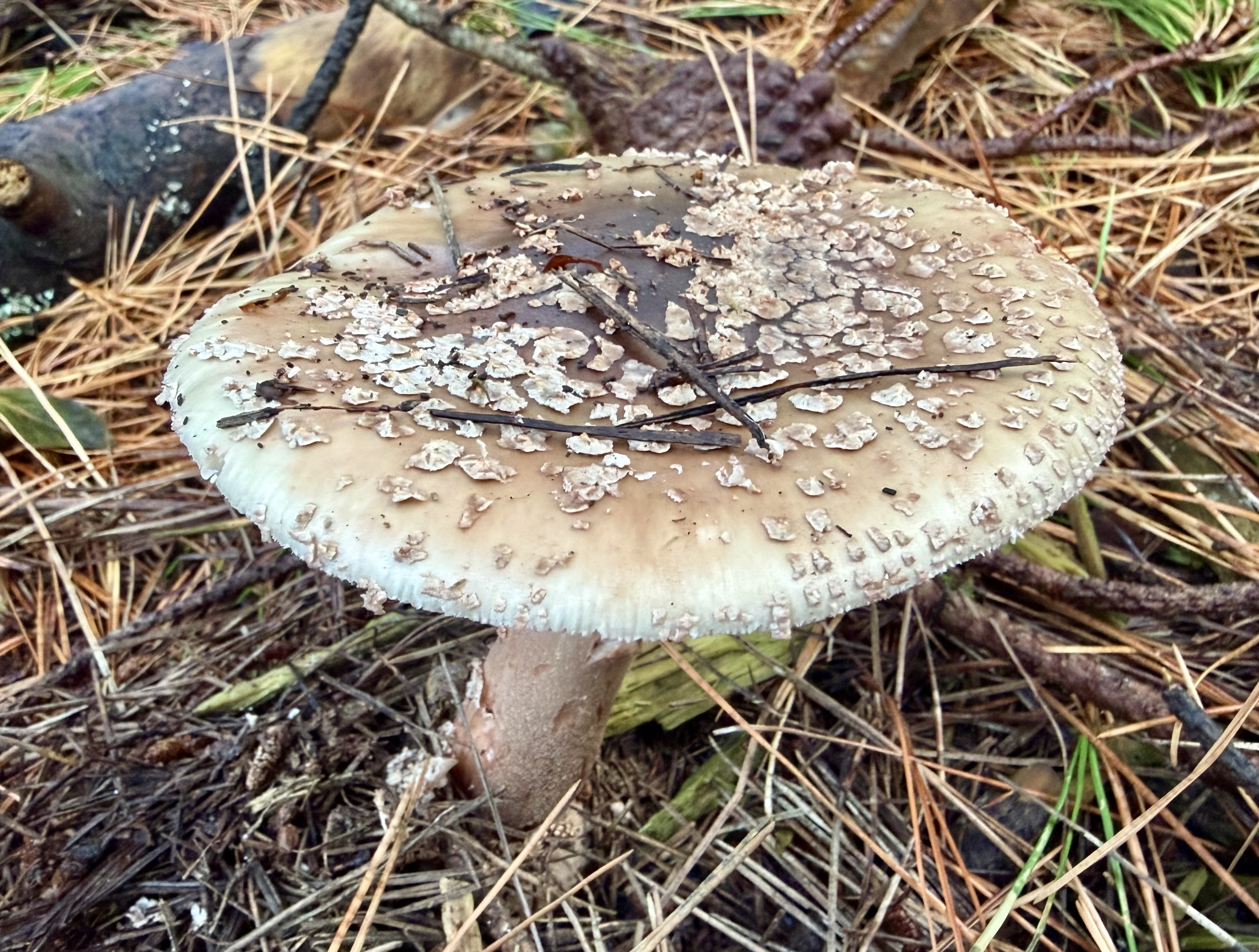
Amanita rubescens in coniferous woodland, Wales, UK

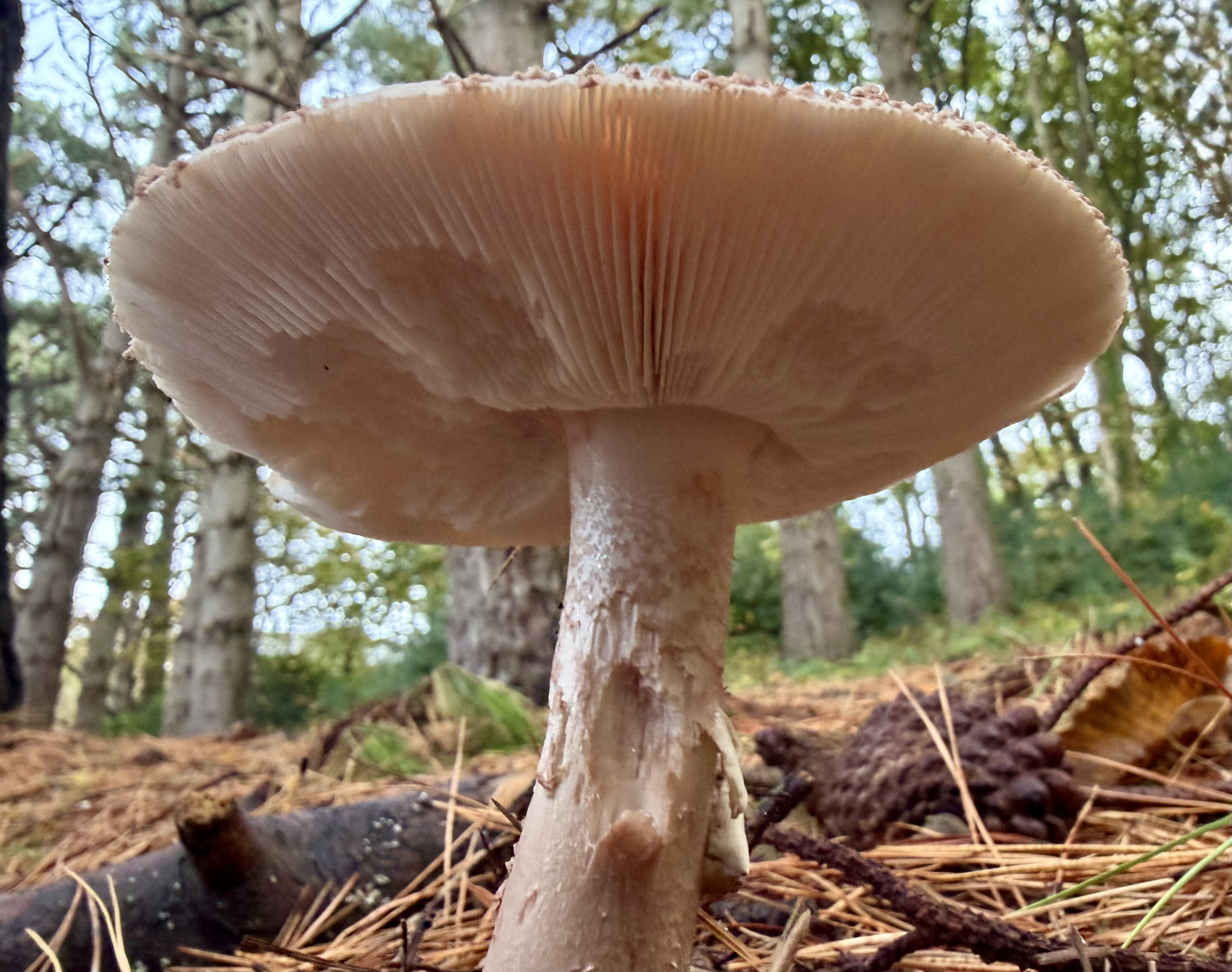
Underside of Amanita rubescens in coniferous woodland, Wales, UK

== Ecology ==
In eastern North America, species in the A. rubescens group are frequently parasitized by Hypomyces hyalinus. Parasitized fruiting bodies are extremely difficult to recognize unless they occur in conjunction with healthy ones, although some retain the "blushing" characteristic of the species.

A.amerirubescens and possibly A.novinupta are the main food for adults and larvae of the pleasing fungus beetle Tritoma biguttata; in older sources they are still listed as A.rubescens.

== Uses ==
A. rubescens is edible when cooked. A. rubescens contains a toxic hemolytic protein in its raw state, although it is not apparently harmful to consume and can be destroyed by cooking. It is noted in some mushroom books as poisonous, with David Pegler stating that if eaten raw in large quantities it can cause severe anaemia if left untreated; Pegler classifies it as a blood cell-damaging (haemolytic-poisoning) mushroom. It also resembles some toxic species.

== See also ==
- List of Amanita species
