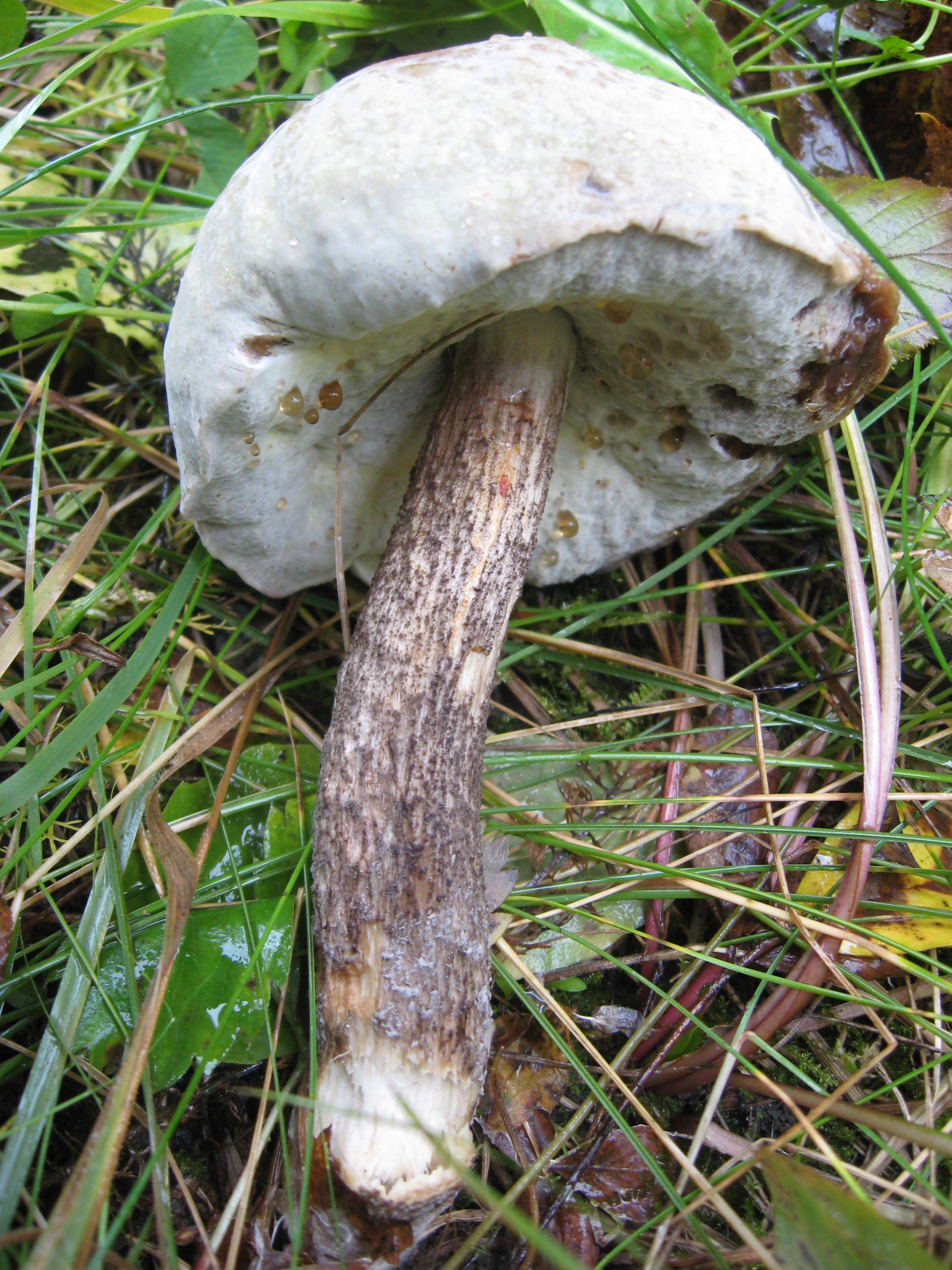
- Hypomyces chrysospermus infecting a Leccinum bolete

Scientific classification
- Kingdom: Fungi
- Division: Ascomycota
- Class: Sordariomycetes
- Order: Hypocreales
- Family: Hypocreaceae
- Genus: Hypomyces
- Species: H. chrysospermus

Binomial name
- Hypomyces chrysospermus Tul. & C.Tul. (1860)

Synonyms
- Hypolyssus chrysospermus (Tul. & C.Tul.) Kuntze (1898); Apiocrea chrysosperma (Tul. & C.Tul.) Syd. & P.Syd. (1921); Sepedonium chrysosperma (Bull.) Fr.

= Hypomyces chrysospermus =

Fungal parasite of bolete mushrooms

Hypomyces chrysospermus
- Mycological characteristics
- Smooth hymenium
- Hymenium attachment is not applicable
- Lacks a stipe
- Spore print is white to yellow
- Ecology is parasitic
- Edibility is inedible or poisonous

Hypomyces chrysospermus, the bolete eater, is a parasitic ascomycete fungus that grows on bolete mushrooms, turning the afflicted host a whitish, golden yellow, or tan color. It is found in Eurasia and North America, as well as southwest Western Australia.

Bolete eater and its afflicted host mushrooms are not edible and may be poisonous.

== Taxonomy ==
Hypomyces chrysospermus was first described by French mycologists, brothers Louis René and Charles Tulasne in 1860. Common names include bolete eater, and bolete mould.

The bolete eater belongs to a genus of parasitic ascomycetes, each species of which infects differing genera of fungi. For example, H. lactifluorum attacks mushrooms of the family Russulaceae, H. completus and H. transformans infect Suillus species, H. melanocarpus prefers Tylopilus species, while other Hypomyces have a much broader host range.

== Description ==
The bolete eater infects boletes, initially with a thin whitish layer which then becomes golden and finally a reddish-brown pimpled appearance. The bolete's flesh softens and is putrescent by the third stage. Single or multiple boletes may be infected, species of Paxillus and Rhizopogon are also attacked.

The spores are oval-shaped and smooth in the white stage and measure 10–30 by 5–12 μm, and are warty, round and thicker-walled in the yellow stage and are 10–25 μm in diameter. These two stages are asexual, while the final stage is sexual; here the spores are spindle-shaped and measure 25–30 by 5–6 μm.

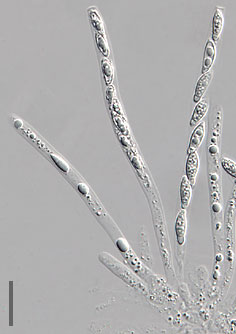
Ascus and spores

=== Similar species ===
The related lobster mushroom, H. lactifluorum, is edible. Several species of the genus may be indistinguishable without microscopy.

== Distribution and habitat ==
Hypomyces chrysospermus is found in North America, and Europe, where it is common. It is common in the southwest of Western Australia, where it is found in forest and coastal plant communities. It is also found in the Eastern Chinese provinces of Hebei, Jiangsu, Anhui, and Fujian.

== Toxicity and uses ==
H. chrysospermus is not edible and may be poisonous. It is used in traditional Chinese medicine to stop bleeding, primarily via topical application onto open wounds.

== Cadmium tolerance in fungi ==
Fungi have demonstrated an ability to effectively absorb heavy metals, which has increased interest in using them for low-cost and efficient pollution remediation in heavily contaminated environments. H. chrysospermus tolerates cadmium by expressing specific genes in response to cadmium stress, helping it absorb and resist heavy metal pollution. Notably, it activates 1,839 genes related to membrane functions and metal transport.
