= Hypomyces orthosporus =

Scientific classification
- Domain: Eukaryota
- Kingdom: Fungi
- Division: Ascomycota
- Class: Sordariomycetes
- Order: Hypocreales
- Family: Hypocreaceae
- Genus: Hypomyces
- Species: H. orthosporus

Binomial name
- Hypomyces orthosporus K.Põldmaa

Species of fungus

Hypomyces orthosporus is a species of fungus belonging to the family Hypocreaceae.

It is native to Europe and Northern America.
