= Hypomyces lithuanicus =

Scientific classification
- Domain: Eukaryota
- Kingdom: Fungi
- Division: Ascomycota
- Class: Sordariomycetes
- Order: Hypocreales
- Family: Hypocreaceae
- Genus: Hypomyces
- Species: H. lithuanicus

Binomial name
- Hypomyces lithuanicus Heinr.-Norm. (1969)

Species of fungus

Hypomyces lithuanicus is a parasitic ascomycete in the Hypocreales order. The fungus produces a cream-ochre to cinnamon-colored granular or velvety growth of mycelium on the surfaces of the gills of agaric fungi like Lactarius torminosus, causing them to be deformed.
