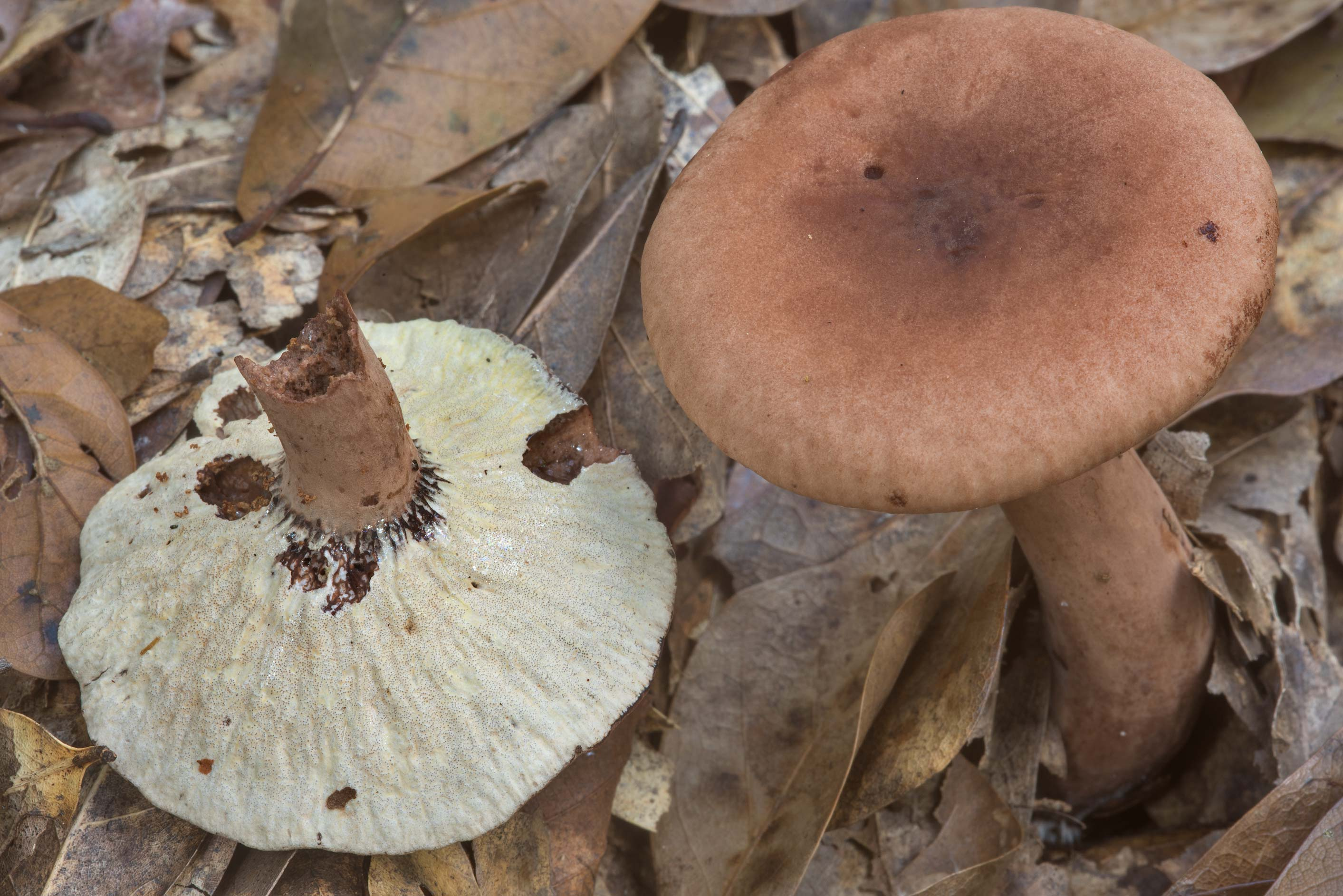
- Hypomyces camphorati

Scientific classification
- Domain: Eukaryota
- Kingdom: Fungi
- Division: Ascomycota
- Class: Sordariomycetes
- Order: Hypocreales
- Family: Hypocreaceae
- Genus: Hypomyces
- Species: H. camphorati

Binomial name
- Hypomyces camphorati Peck (1906)

Synonyms
- Peckiella camphorati (Peck) Seaver (1910)

= Hypomyces camphorati =

Species of fungus

Hypomyces camphorati is a parasitic ascomycete in the family Hypocreaceae. Its host species is Lactarius camphoratus, and it causes a whitish to yellowish subiculum to form on the hymenium of the host, covering and preventing formation of the gills. It also causes deformed cap shape and densifying flesh.

Hypomyces camphorati is often treated as Hypomyces lateritius, but it is set apart by its yellowish coloration and slightly larger ascospores. Further research is required to determine whether H. camphorati is indeed a separate species.
