= Kadri Põldmaa =

Estonian mycologist

Kadri Põldmaa (born 28 April 1970 in Tartu) is an Estonian mycologist.

Põldmaa is the daughter of mycologist Peeter Põldmaa (1929–1990). She graduated from Tartu Secondary School No. 2 (now, the Miina Härma Gymnasium) in 1988. In 1992, she graduated from the University of Tartu's Department of Biology, receiving her master's degree from the institution in 1994, and her PhD in 1998 with the dissertation Studies in the Systematics of Hypomyces and Allied Genera (Hypocreales, Ascomycota). From 1999 until 2000, she was a postdoctoral student at the University of Pennsylvania and from 2002 to 2003 at the Estonian Biocentre.

Areas of research include taxonomy and distribution of taxa growing on the fruiting bodies of the fungal family Hypocreaceae in the world and microfungi growing on the fruiting bodies and fungi of Estonia. Põldmaa has described 35 new fungal species and one fungal family for science, including the taxon Hypomyces orthosporus.
