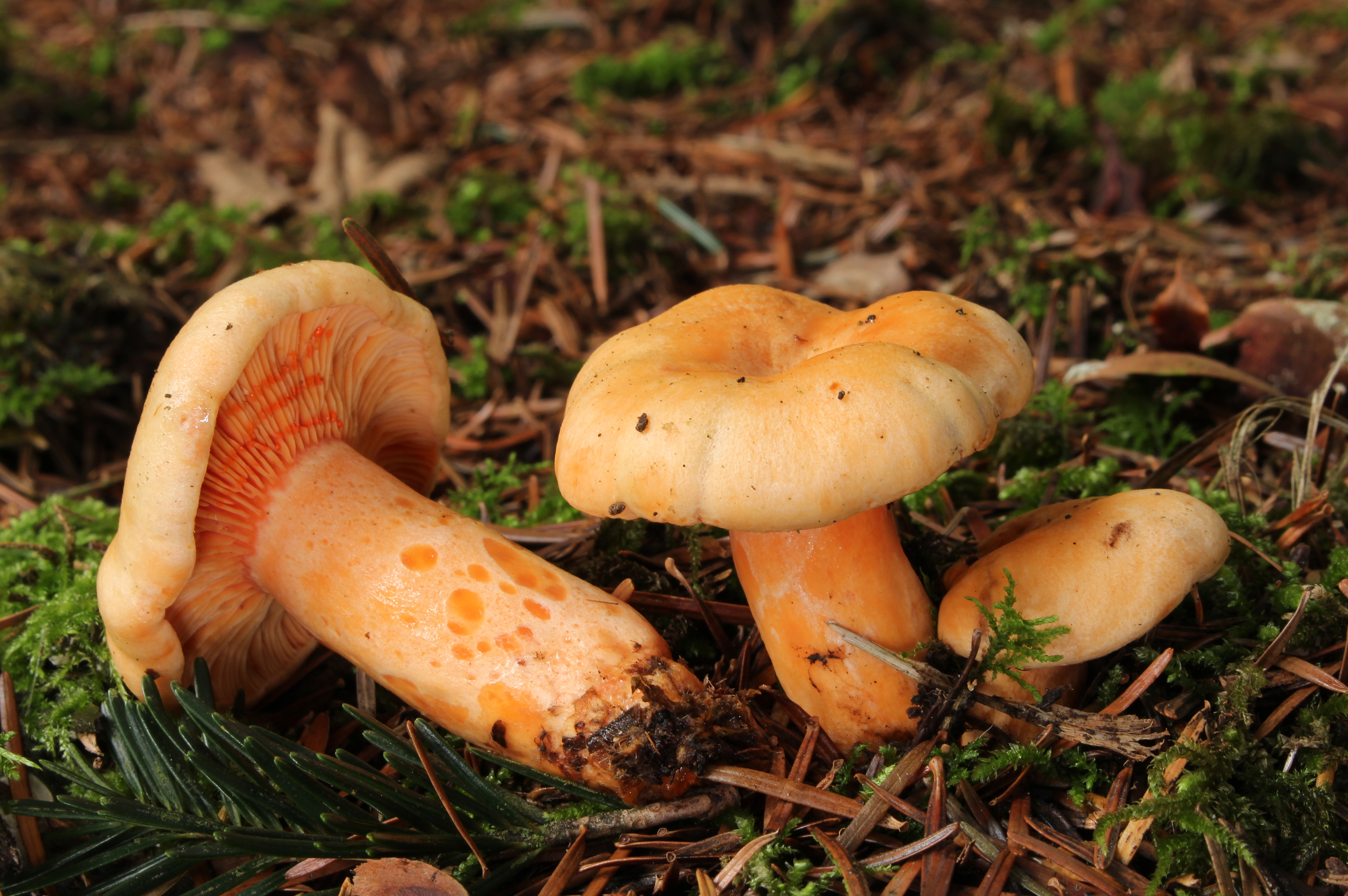

Scientific classification
- Kingdom: Fungi
- Division: Basidiomycota
- Class: Agaricomycetes
- Order: Russulales
- Family: Russulaceae
- Genus: Lactarius
- Species: L. salmonicolor

Binomial name
- Lactarius salmonicolor R. Heim & Leclair (1953)

Synonyms
- Lactarius salmoneus R. Heim & Leclair (1950); Lactarius subsalmoneus Pouzar (1954); Lactarius thyinos A.H. Smith (1960); Lactarius salmonicolor f. brigantiacus L. Rémy (1965)

= Lactarius salmonicolor =

Species of fungus

Mycological characteristics
- Gills on hymenium
- Cap is depressed or convex
- Hymenium is decurrent
- Stipe is bare
- Spore print is yellow-orange
- Ecology is mycorrhizal
- Edibility is edible or choice

Lactarius salmonicolor is a species of fungus in the family Russulaceae. It is native to Europe and North America. It has some culinary uses in parts of Europe.

== Etymology ==
The species derives its name from the term "salmonicolor", meaning salmon-colored in Latin.

== Description ==
Lactarius salmonicolor can be found throughout most of Europe from September to November, the species' growing season. The fungus grows primarily near to the roots of fir trees, where it receives nutrients for its growth, participating in ectomycorrhiza with the roots of its host plant. The top of the pileus is an orange-reddish color, with rare spots of green in older decaying specimens. The cap is also slightly depressed in the center after an initial convexity, and irregularly shaped, sometimes with lobes. The surface of the cap is also smooth and viscid. On the underside of the cap, the lamellas are evenly spaced, with gills occasionally splitting as they become decurrent on the beginning of the stipe. They are salmon-orange and usually slightly lighter than the top of the cap; however they turn red after bruising.

The stipe is cylindrical and more often long and slender, but rarely it can be found as short and thick. L. salmonicolor has a mild and slightly acrid flavor but becomes bitter after time. The spore deposit is pale yellow to orange in color, and spores have variations such as ridges and warts on the surface up to 0.5 μm high.

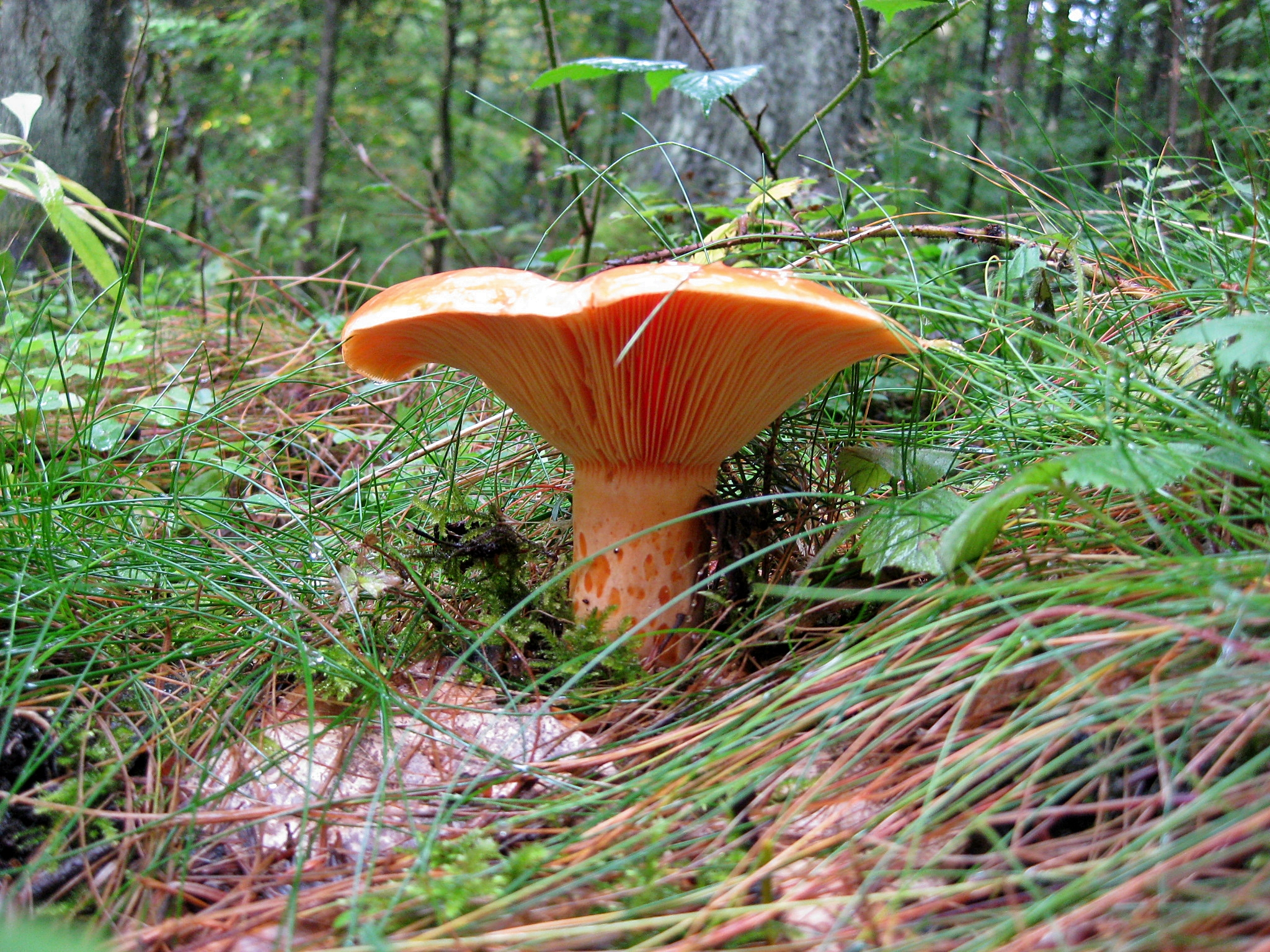
L. salmonicolor

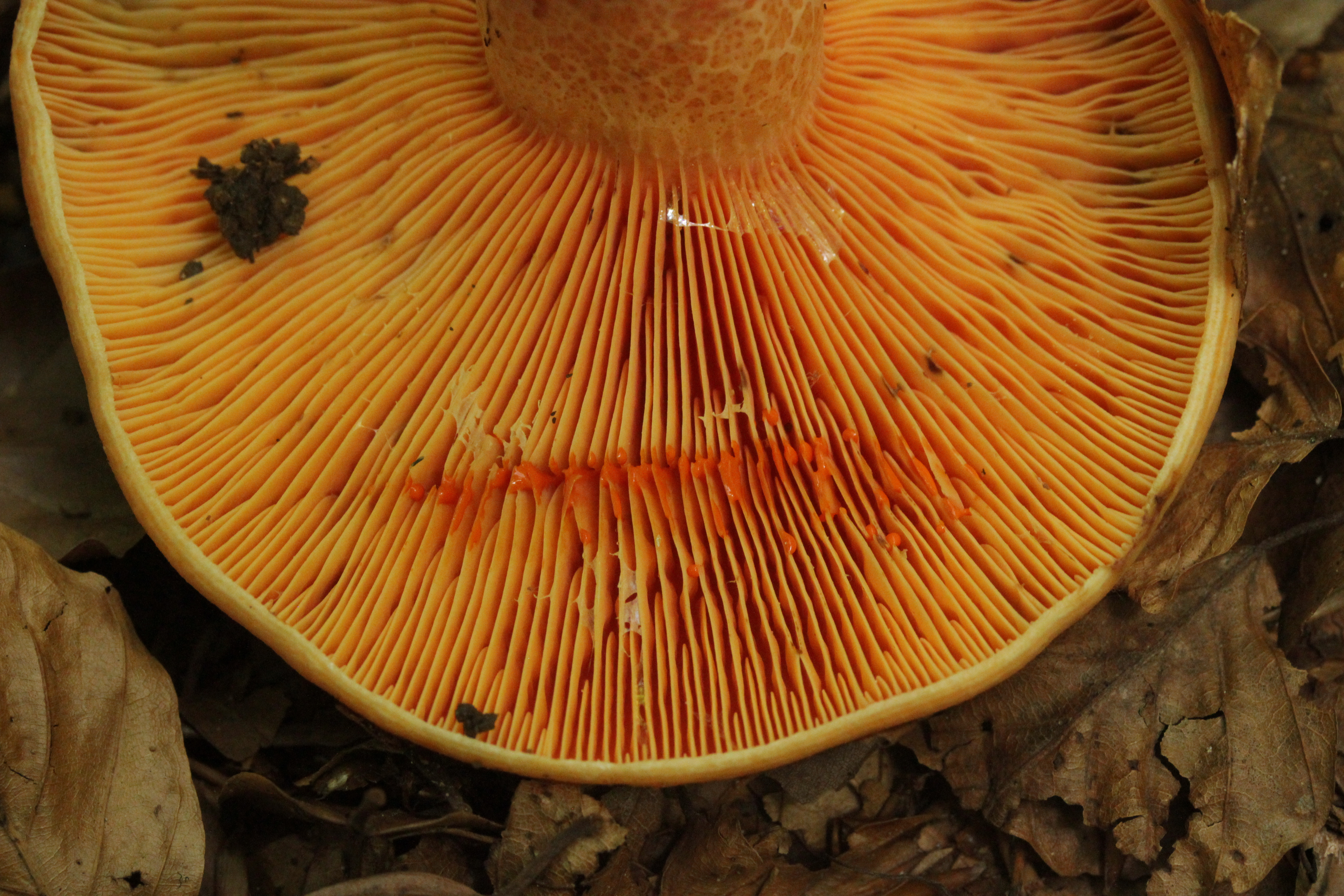
Closeup of lamella

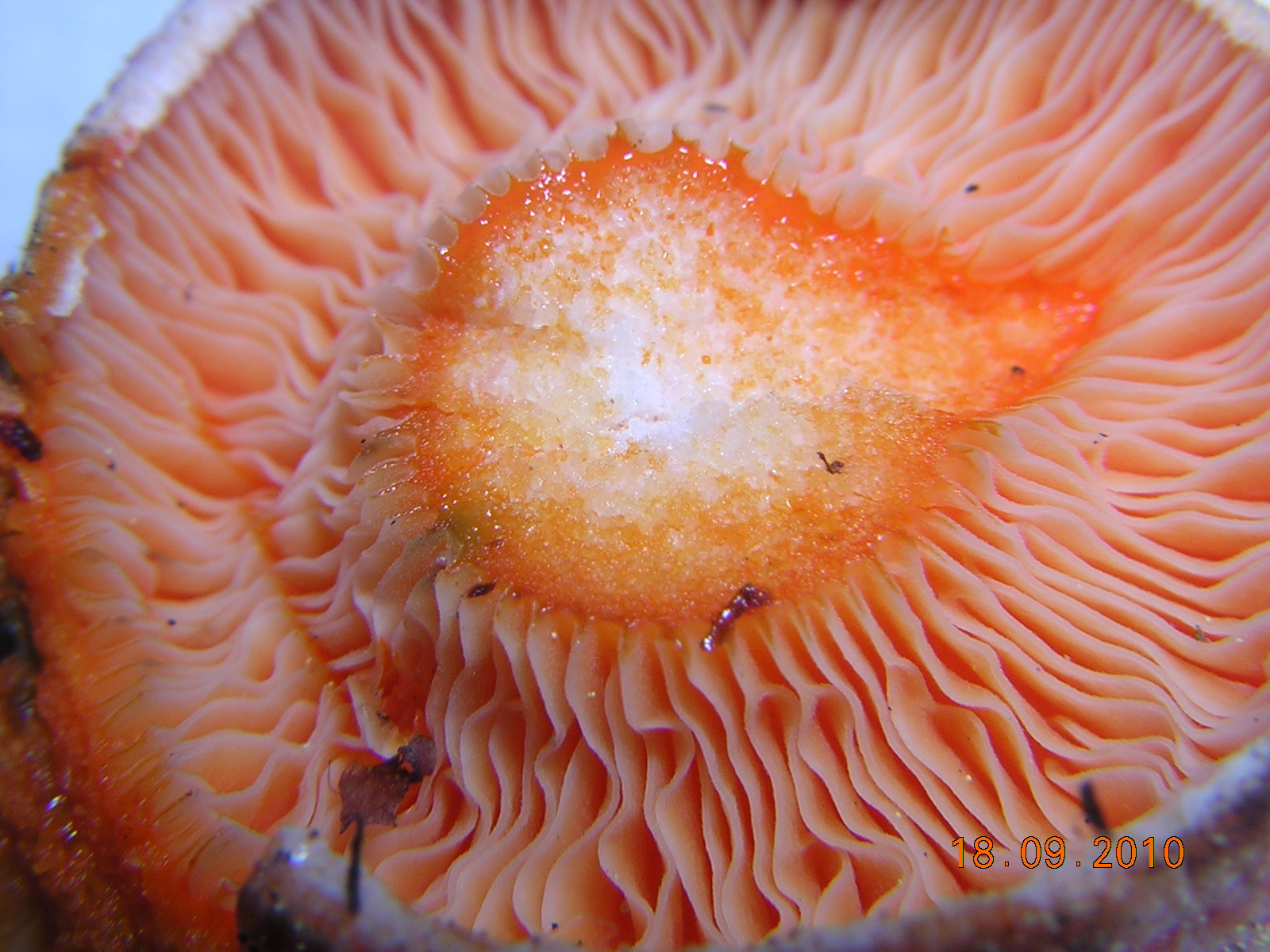
Lamella and flesh

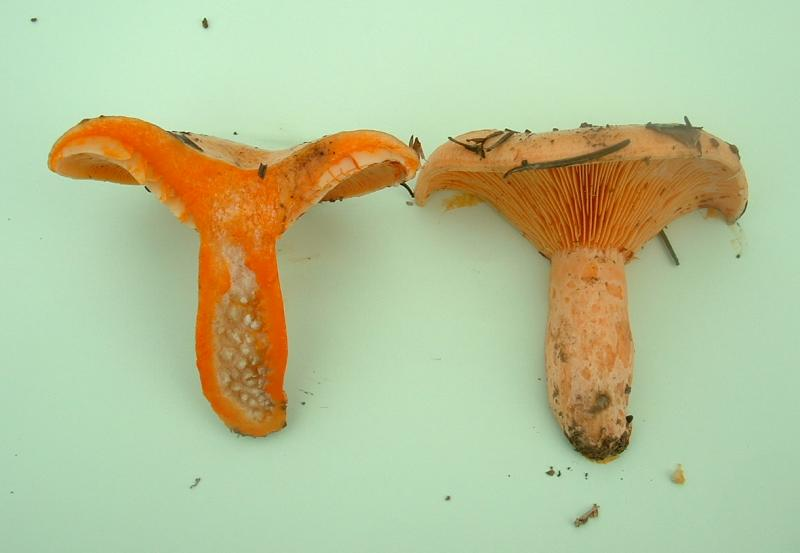
Flesh

== Distribution and habitat ==
The species is native to most of Europe as well as in bogs and conifer forests of Canada, the Great Lakes region and the northeastern United States.

== Uses ==
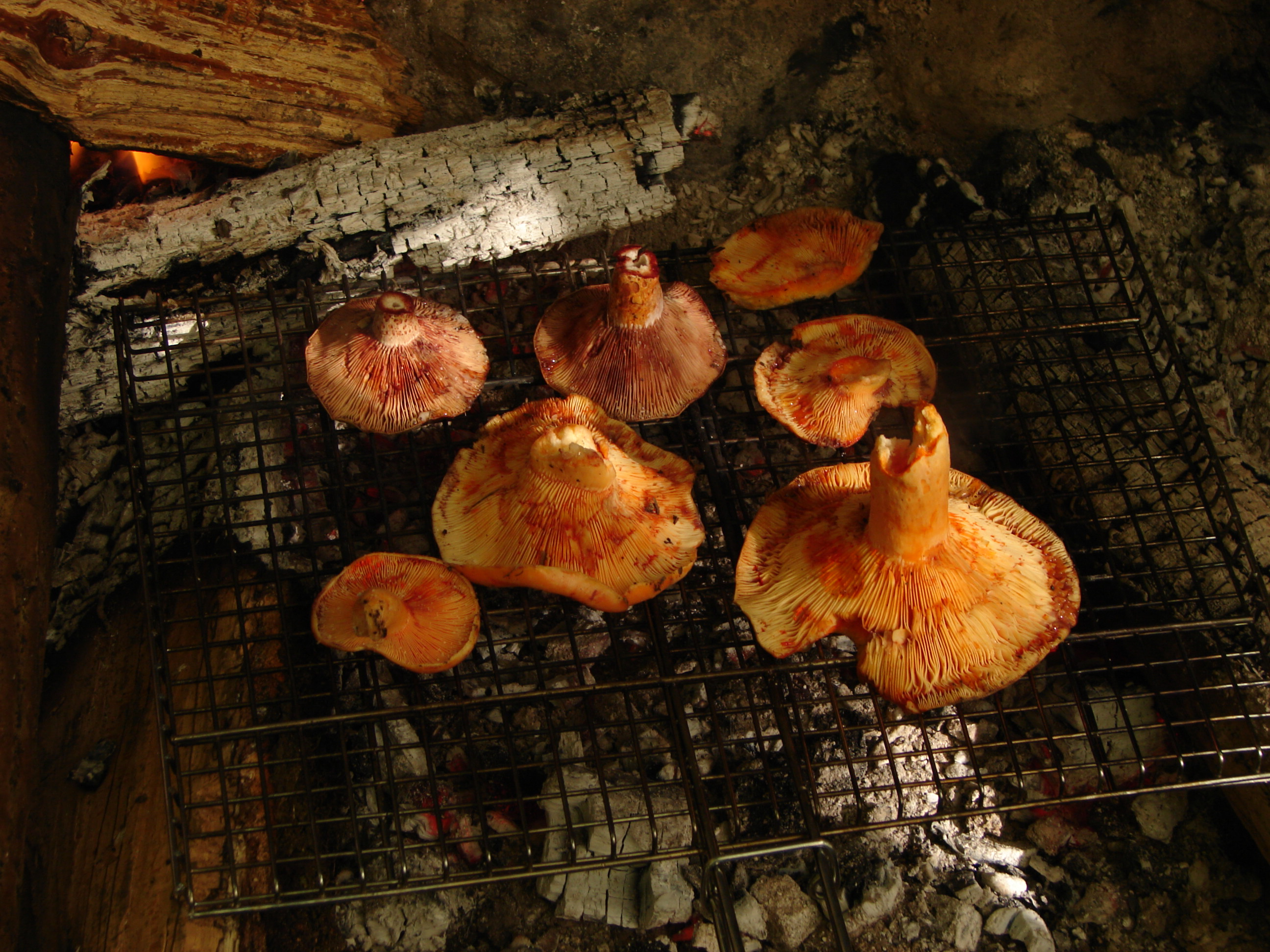
Milky agaric cooked at Bolu province, Turkey

This fungus, like most milky caps, is often used in regional cuisine, especially in areas of Europe. Due to its common use throughout different European cultures, it has developed many common names such as "fungo del sangue" ("blood fungus" in Italian), "lactaire couleur de saumon" ("salmon colored milk cap" in French), "milky agaric" (UK), and many more.
