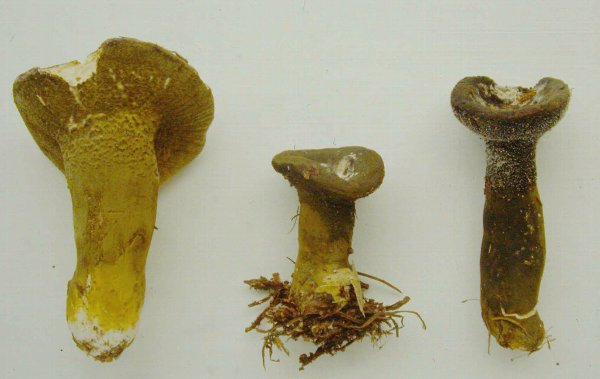
- Hypomyces luteovirens occurring on basidiomata of Lactarius laeticolorus

Scientific classification
- Kingdom: Fungi
- Division: Ascomycota
- Class: Sordariomycetes
- Order: Hypocreales
- Family: Hypocreaceae
- Genus: Hypomyces
- Species: H. luteovirens

Binomial name
- Hypomyces luteovirens (Fr.) Tul.

= Hypomyces luteovirens =

Species of fungus

Hypomyces luteovirens
- Mycological characteristics
- Smooth hymenium
- Lacks a stipe
- Ecology is parasitic
- Edibility is not recommended

Hypomyces luteovirens, commonly known as the green langoustine, is a parasitic fungus in the genus Hypomyces. It is a green mold that grows on certain Russula mushrooms. It sometimes grows on Lactarius species. It is not recommended for consumption, because its host species and host edibility are largely unknown.

== Description ==
The fruiting body of Hypomyces luteovirens is a crusty, bumpy moldlike structure that grows on certain Russula and Lactarius mushrooms. It starts out white or yellow, becoming light green and eventually dark green as it matures. The fungus rarely covers the cap of its host and typically only covers the gills and upper stipe. The fungus makes its host's gills look more shallow, destroying their structure. H. luteovirens produces tiny parathecia in order to release its spores.

== Habitat and ecology ==
Hypomyces luteovirens is a parasite to Russula mushrooms, especially purple and red ones. It also sometimes grows on Lactarius mushrooms.
