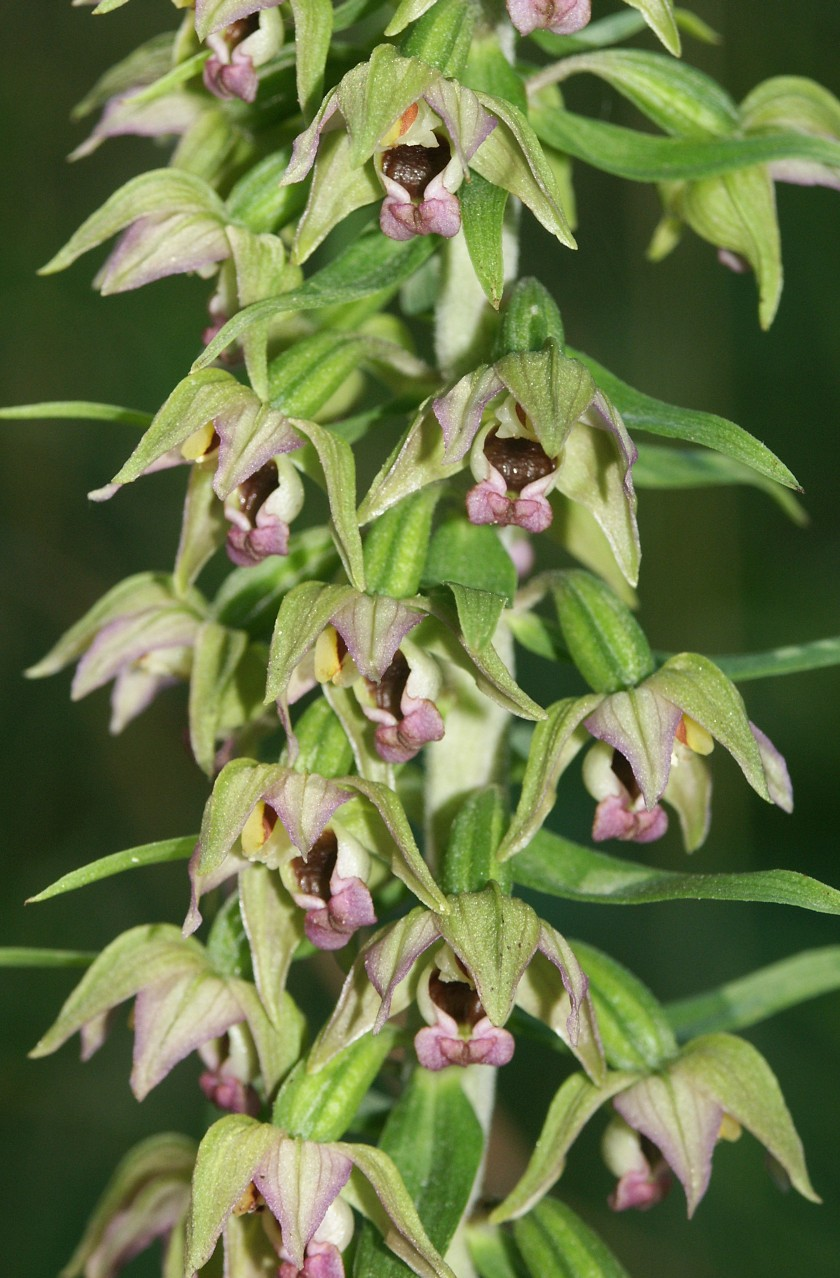

Scientific classification
- Kingdom: Plantae
- Clade: Tracheophytes
- Clade: Angiosperms
- Clade: Monocots
- Order: Asparagales
- Family: Orchidaceae
- Subfamily: Epidendroideae
- Genus: Epipactis
- Species: E. helleborine

Binomial name
- Epipactis helleborine (L.) Crantz

Subspecies and varieties
- E. h. subsp. bithynica; E. h. subsp. helleborine; E. h. subsp. neerlandica; E. h. var. tangutica; E. h. subsp. tremolsii

Synonyms
- List: Epipactis latifolia subsp. helleborine; Helleborine helleborine; Serapias helleborine

= Epipactis helleborine =

Species of orchid

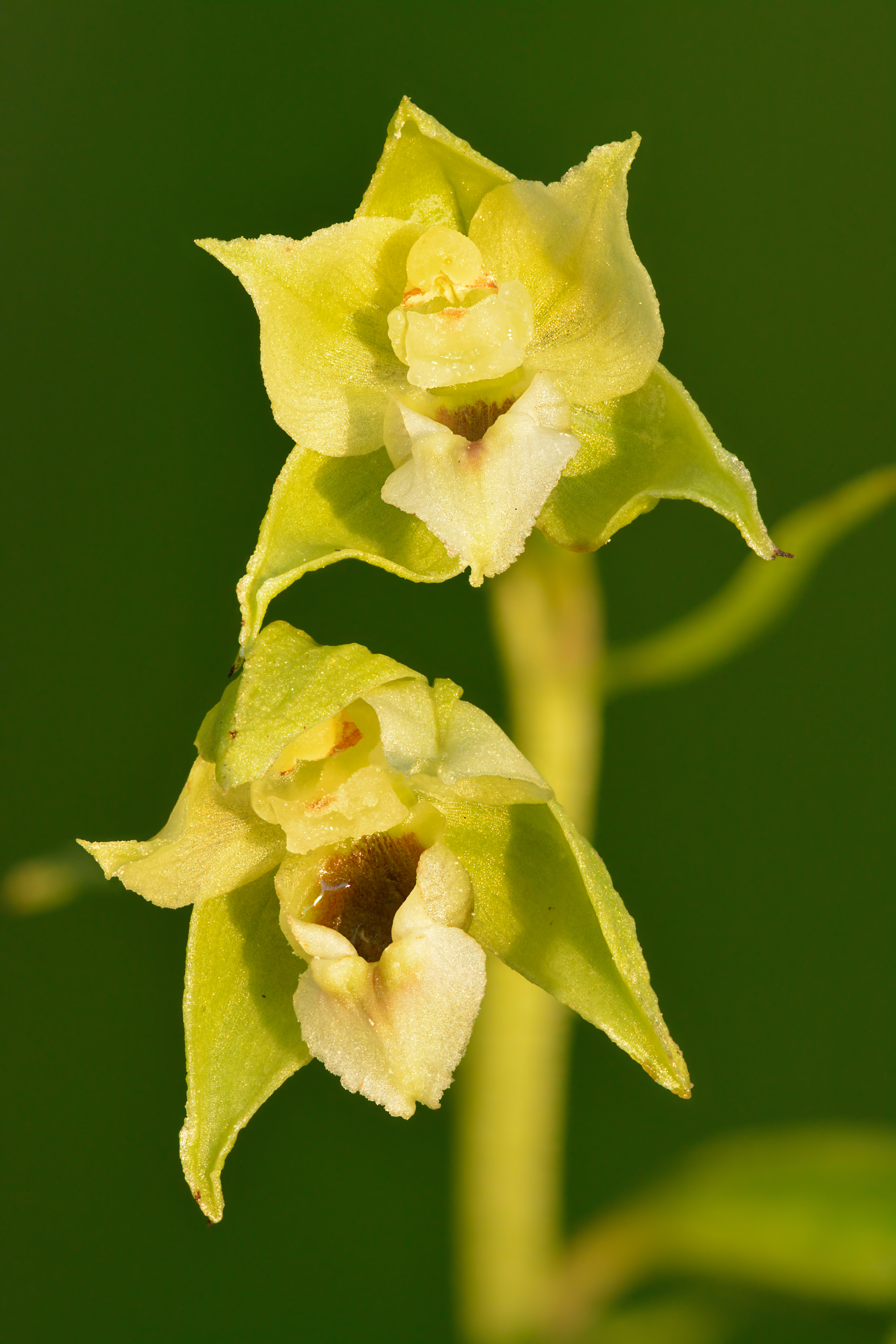
Flowers

Epipactis helleborine, the broad-leaved helleborine, is a terrestrial species of orchid with a broad distribution. It is a long lived herb which varies morphologically with ability to self-pollinate.

== Description ==
Epipactis helleborine can grow to a maximum height of 1 m (3 ft 3 in) or more under good conditions, and has broad dull green leaves which are strongly ribbed and flat. The flowers are arranged in long drooping racemes with dull green sepals and shorter upper petals. The lower labellum is pale red and is much shorter than the upper petals.

Achlorophyllous, white Epipactis helleborine plants have been found. Achlorophyllous forms tend to be shorter, as small as 17 cm.

Flowering occurs June–September.

== Taxonomy ==
Epipactis helleborine was given the scientific name Serapias helleborine by Carl Linnaeus in 1753. The botanist Heinrich Johann Nepomuk von Crantz moved the species to Epipactis in 1769 giving the species its accepted name. It is classified as a member of the family Orchidaceae.

=== Subspecies ===
Over 100 names have been proposed for subspecies, varieties and forms of Epipactis helleborine. However, according the Plants of the World Online there are just four accepted subspecies and one variety:

1. Epipactis helleborine subsp. bithynica (Robatsch) Kreutz – Turkey, Caucasus
2. Epipactis helleborine subsp. helleborine – widespread
3. Epipactis helleborine subsp. neerlandica (Verm.) Buttler – Great Britain, Norway, Sweden, Denmark, Belgium, Netherlands, France, Germany
4. Epipactis helleborine var. tangutica (Schltr.) S.C.Chen & G.H.Zhu – China
5. Epipactis helleborine subsp. tremolsii (Pau) E.Klein – France, Spain, Portugal, Sardinia, Italy, Algeria, Morocco

It has 225 synonyms of the species or one of its lower taxa.

Table of Synonyms
Name	Year	Rank	Synonym of:	Notes
Amesia consimilis (D.Don) A.Nelson & J.F.Macbr.	1913	species	subsp. helleborine	= het.
Amesia discolor (Kraenzl.) Hu	1925	species	subsp. helleborine	= het.
Amesia latifolia (L.) A.Nelson & J.F.Macbr.	1913	species	subsp. helleborine	= het.
Amesia latifolia f. monotropoides Mousley	1927	form	subsp. helleborine	= het.
Amesia latifolia f. variegata Mousley	1927	form	subsp. helleborine	= het.
Amesia longibracteata Schweinf.	1929	species	subsp. helleborine	= het.
Amesia monticola (Schltr.) Hu	1925	species	subsp. helleborine	= het.
Amesia orbicularis (K.Richt.) A.Nelson & J.F.Macbr.	1913	species	subsp. helleborine	= het.
Amesia pycnostachys (K.Koch) A.Nelson & J.F.Macbr.	1913	species	subsp. helleborine	= het.
Amesia squamellosa (Schltr.) Hu	1925	species	subsp. helleborine	= het.
Amesia tangutica (Schltr.) Hu	1925	species	subsp. tangutica	≡ hom.
Amesia tenii (Schltr.) Hu	1925	species	subsp. helleborine	= het.
Amesia yunnanensis (Schltr.) Hu	1925	species	subsp. helleborine	= het.
Calliphyllon latifolium (L.) Bubani	1901	species	subsp. helleborine	= het.
Cymbidium latifolium (L.) Sw.	1800	species	subsp. helleborine	= het.
Epipactis aspromontana Bartolo, Pulv. & Robatsch	1996	species	subsp. helleborine	= het.
Epipactis atropurpurea var. tremolsii (Pau) Schltr.	1928	variety	subsp. tremolsii	≡ hom.
Epipactis atroviridis Linton	1903	species	subsp. helleborine	= het.
Epipactis autumnalis Doro	2007	species	subsp. helleborine	= het.
Epipactis bithynica Robatsch	1991	species	subsp. bithynica	≡ hom.
Epipactis calabrica U.Grabner, S.Hertel & Presser	2014	species	subsp. helleborine	= het.
Epipactis cardina Benito & C.E.Hermos.	1998	species	subsp. tremolsii	= het.
Epipactis collaris S.Hertel	2015	species	subsp. helleborine	= het.
Epipactis condensata Kreutz, Fateryga, and Efimov	2014	species	subsp. kuenkeleana	= het.
Epipactis consimilis D.Don	1825	species	subsp. helleborine	= het.
Epipactis dalhousieae Wight	1851	species	subsp. helleborine	= het.
Epipactis degenii Szentp. & Mónus	1999	species	subsp. helleborine	= het.
Epipactis densifolia W.Hahn, Passin & R.Wegener	2003	species	subsp. tremolsii	= het.
Epipactis discolor Kraenzl.	1921	species	subsp. helleborine	= het.
Epipactis distans Arv.-Touv.	1872	species	subsp. helleborine	= het.
Epipactis duriensis Bernardos, D.Tyteca, Revuelta & Amich	2004	species	subsp. tremolsii	= het.
Epipactis etrusca Presser & S.Hertel	2014	species	subsp. helleborine	= het.
Epipactis greuteri var. aspromontana (Bartolo, Pulv. & Robatsch) P.Delforge	2006	variety	subsp. helleborine	= het.
Epipactis gutta-sanguinis Arv.-Touv.	1872	species	subsp. helleborine	= het.
Epipactis halacsyi subsp. degenii (Szentp. & Mónus) Kreutz	2004	subspecies	subsp. helleborine	= het.
Epipactis helleborine f. alba (Webster) B.Boivin	1967	form	subsp. helleborine	= het.
Epipactis helleborine f. albifolia M.R.Lowe	1990	form	subsp. helleborine	= het.
Epipactis helleborine subsp. aspromontana (Bartolo, Pulv. & Robatsch) H.Baumann & R.Lorenz	2005	subspecies	subsp. helleborine	= het.
Epipactis helleborine f. brevibracteata (Zapał.) Bordz.	1950	form	subsp. helleborine	= het.
Epipactis helleborine var. castanearum Gévaudan, Nicole & Anglade	2011	variety	subsp. tremolsii	= het.
Epipactis helleborine var. chlorantha Verm.	1949	variety	subsp. helleborine	= het.
Epipactis helleborine subsp. degenii (Szentp. & Mónus) Kreutz	2007	subspecies	subsp. helleborine	= het.
Epipactis helleborine var. densiflora Verm.	1949	variety	subsp. helleborine	= het.
Epipactis helleborine subsp. densifolia (W.Hahn, Passin & R.Wegener) Kreutz	2005	subspecies	subsp. tremolsii	= het.
Epipactis helleborine f. dentata (Zapał.) Soó	1969	form	subsp. helleborine	= het.
Epipactis helleborine f. dilatata (Asch. & Graebn.) Soó	1969	form	subsp. helleborine	= het.
Epipactis helleborine subsp. distans (Arv.-Touv.) R.Engel & P.Quentin	1996	subspecies	subsp. helleborine	= het.
Epipactis helleborine var. diversifolia Verm.	1949	variety	subsp. helleborine	= het.
Epipactis helleborine var. herbacea (Lindl.) S.N.Mitra	1973	variety	subsp. helleborine	= het.
Epipactis helleborine var. interrupta Beck	1890	variety	subsp. helleborine	= het.
Epipactis helleborine lusus interrupta (Beck) Verm.	1958	sport	subsp. helleborine	= het.
Epipactis helleborine var. intrusa (Lindl.) S.N.Mitra	1973	variety	subsp. helleborine	= het.
Epipactis helleborine var. lancifolia (Zapał.) Bordz.	1950	variety	subsp. helleborine	= het.
Epipactis helleborine subsp. latifolia (L.) Syme	1869	subspecies	subsp. helleborine	= het.
Epipactis helleborine var. latifolia (L.) A.Blytt	1903	variety	subsp. helleborine	= het.
Epipactis helleborine subsp. latina W.Rossi & E.Klein	1987	subspecies	subsp. tremolsii	= het.
Epipactis helleborine var. laxiflora Verm.	1949	variety	subsp. helleborine	= het.
Epipactis helleborine subsp. leutei (Robatsch) Kreutz	2004	subspecies	subsp. helleborine	= het.
Epipactis helleborine subsp. levantina Kreutz, Óvári & Shifman	2010	subspecies	subsp. tremolsii	= het.
Epipactis helleborine subsp. lusitanica (D.Tyteca) J.-M.Tison	2010	subspecies	subsp. tremolsii	= het., with incorrect basionym ref.
Epipactis helleborine f. luteola P.M.Br.	1996	form	subsp. helleborine	= het.
Epipactis helleborine f. macrophylla Snarskis	1963	form	subsp. helleborine	= het.
Epipactis helleborine subsp. minor (R.Engel) R.Engel	1992	subspecies	subsp. helleborine	= het.
Epipactis helleborine var. minor R.Engel	1984	variety	subsp. helleborine	= het.
Epipactis helleborine f. minor (R.Engel) P.Delforge	2006	form	subsp. helleborine	= het.
Epipactis helleborine subsp. molochina (P.Delforge) Kreutz	2004	subspecies	subsp. helleborine	= het.
Epipactis helleborine var. monotropoides (Mousley) L.Lewis	2015	variety	subsp. helleborine	= het.
Epipactis helleborine f. monotropoides (Mousley) Scoggan	1978	form	subsp. helleborine	= het.
Epipactis helleborine f. montana (Zapał.) Bordz.	1950	form	subsp. helleborine	= het.
Epipactis helleborine subsp. moratoria Riech. & Zirnsack	2008	subspecies	subsp. helleborine	= het.
Epipactis helleborine var. moratoria (Riech. & Zirnsack) P.Delforge	2011	variety	subsp. helleborine	= het.
Epipactis helleborine var. neerlandica Verm.	1949	variety	subsp. neerlandica	≡ hom.
Epipactis helleborine f. obtusa (Zapał.) Soó	1969	form	subsp. helleborine	= het.
Epipactis helleborine subsp. orbicularis (K.Richt.) E.Klein	1997	subspecies	subsp. helleborine	= het.
Epipactis helleborine var. orbicularis (K.Richt.) Verm.	1958	variety	subsp. helleborine	= het.
Epipactis helleborine f. parviflora (Zapał.) Bordz.	1950	form	subsp. helleborine	= het.
Epipactis helleborine var. phoenicea Verm.	1949	variety	subsp. helleborine	= het.
Epipactis helleborine f. przemysliensis (Zapał.) Verm.	1958	form	subsp. helleborine	= het.
Epipactis helleborine f. remota (Zapał.) Bordz.	1950	form	subsp. helleborine	= het.
Epipactis helleborine subsp. renzii (Robatsch) Løjtnant	1996	subspecies	subsp. neerlandica	= het.
Epipactis helleborine var. renzii (Robatsch) J.Claess. Kleynen & Wielinga	1998	variety	subsp. neerlandica	= het.
Epipactis helleborine subsp. schubertiorum (Bartolo, Pulv. & Robatsch) Kreutz	2004	subspecies	subsp. helleborine	= het.
Epipactis helleborine var. thomsonii (Hook.f.) S.N.Mitra	1973	variety	subsp. helleborine	= het.
Epipactis helleborine subsp. turcica (Kreutz) Véla & Viglione	2015	subspecies	subsp. tremolsii	= het.
Epipactis helleborine f. variegata (Webster) B.Boivin	1967	form	subsp. helleborine	= het.
Epipactis helleborine var. viridens A.Gray	1879	variety	subsp. helleborine	= het.
Epipactis helleborine subsp. viridis Soó	1969	subspecies	subsp. helleborine	= het.
Epipactis helleborine var. youngiana (A.J.Richards & A.F.Porter) Kreutz	2004	variety	subsp. neerlandica	= het.
Epipactis helleborine subsp. zirnsackiana (Riech.) Riech.	2010	subspecies	subsp. helleborine	= het.
Epipactis heraclea P.Delforge & Kreutz	2003	species	subsp. tremolsii	= het.
Epipactis herbacea Lindl.	1839	species	subsp. helleborine	= het.
Epipactis intrusa Lindl.	1857	species	subsp. helleborine	= het.
Epipactis kezlinekii Batoušek	2009	species	subsp. helleborine	= het.
Epipactis latifolia (L.) All.	1785	species	subsp. helleborine	= het.
Epipactis latifolia var. acutiloba Huter	1904	variety	subsp. helleborine	= het.
Epipactis latifolia f. alba Webster	1898	form	subsp. helleborine	= het.
Epipactis latifolia f. albiflora E.G.Camus	1929	form	subsp. helleborine	= het.
Epipactis latifolia var. angustifolia Brooke	1950	variety	subsp. helleborine	= het.
Epipactis latifolia var. condensata E.G.Camus & A.Camus	1912	variety	subsp. helleborine	= het.
Epipactis latifolia var. decipiens E.G.Camus	1908	variety	subsp. helleborine	= het.
Epipactis latifolia var. dentata (Zapał.) E.G.Camus	1929	variety	subsp. helleborine	= het.
Epipactis latifolia var. dilatata Asch. & Graebn.	1907	variety	subsp. helleborine	= het.
Epipactis latifolia subsp. helleborine (L.) Rivas Goday & Borja	1961	subspecies	E. helleborine	≡ hom., nom. illeg.
Epipactis latifolia var. interrupta (Beck) M.Schulze	1894	variety	subsp. helleborine	= het.
Epipactis latifolia var. intrusa (Lindl.) Hook.f.	1890	variety	subsp. helleborine	= het.
Epipactis latifolia var. major Neilr.	1859	variety	subsp. helleborine	= het.
Epipactis latifolia subsp. orbicularis (K.Richt.) K.Richt.	1890	subspecies	subsp. helleborine	= het.
Epipactis latifolia var. orbicularis (K.Richt.) E.G.Camus	1929	variety	subsp. helleborine	= het.
Epipactis latifolia subsp. ovalis (Bab.) Nyman	1882	subspecies	subsp. helleborine	= het.
Epipactis latifolia var. pallens Gaudin	1829	variety	subsp. helleborine	= het.
Epipactis latifolia var. platyphylla Irmisch	1842	variety	subsp. helleborine	= het.
Epipactis latifolia f. pseudovarians Engenst.	1912	form	subsp. helleborine	= het.
Epipactis latifolia var. pycnostachys K.Koch	1846	variety	subsp. helleborine	= het., nom. nud.
Epipactis latifolia var. pygmaea Walth.Zimm.	1912	variety	subsp. helleborine	= het.
Epipactis latifolia var. robusta Podp.	1922	variety	subsp. helleborine	= het.
Epipactis latifolia var. thomsonii Hook.f.	1890	variety	subsp. helleborine	= het.
Epipactis latifolia f. variegata Webster	1898	form	subsp. helleborine	= het.
Epipactis latifolia var. vulgaris Coss. & Germ.	1845	variety	subsp. helleborine	= het.
Epipactis latina (W.Rossi & E.Klein) B.Baumann & H.Baumann	1988	species	subsp. tremolsii	= het.
Epipactis leptochila subsp. aspromontana (Bartolo, Pulv. & Robatsch) Kreutz	2004	subspecies	subsp. helleborine	= het.
Epipactis leutei Robatsch	1989	species	subsp. helleborine	= het.
Epipactis levantina (Kreutz, Óvári & Shifman) P.Delforge	2015	species	subsp. tremolsii	= het.
Epipactis ligulata Hand.-Mazz.	1936	species	subsp. helleborine	= het.
Epipactis longibracteata (Schweinf.) S.Y.Hu	1972	species	subsp. helleborine	= het., nom. illeg.
Epipactis lucana Presser, S.Hertel & V.A.Romano	2015	species	subsp. helleborine	= het.
Epipactis lusitanica D.Tyteca	1988	species	subsp. tremolsii	= het.
Epipactis macrostachya Lindl.	1840	species	subsp. helleborine	= het.
Epipactis magnibracteata C.Schweinf.	1937	species	subsp. helleborine	= het.
Epipactis meridionalis H.Baumann & R.Lorenz	1988	species	subsp. helleborine	= het.
Epipactis micrantha E.Peter	1937	species	subsp. helleborine	= het., nom. illeg.
Epipactis minor (R.Engel) Kreutz	2021	species	subsp. helleborine	= het.
Epipactis molochina P.Delforge	2004	species	subsp. helleborine	= het.
Epipactis monticola Schltr.	1924	species	subsp. helleborine	= het.
Epipactis moratoria (Riech. & Zirnsack) Riech. & Zirnsack	2015	species	subsp. helleborine	= het.
Epipactis neerlandica (Verm.) Devillers-Tersch. & Devillers	1991	species	subsp. neerlandica	≡ hom.
Epipactis neerlandica var. renzii (Robatsch) P.Delforge	2009	variety	subsp. neerlandica	= het.
Epipactis nephrocordia Schltr.	1924	species	subsp. helleborine	= het.
Epipactis nordeniorum Robatsch	1991	species	subsp. helleborine	= het.
Epipactis orbicularis K.Richt.	1887	species	subsp. helleborine	= het.
Epipactis ovalis Bab.	1843	species	subsp. helleborine	= het.
Epipactis pycnostachys K.Koch	1849	species	subsp. helleborine	= het.
Epipactis renzii Robatsch	1988	species	subsp. neerlandica	= het.
Epipactis sanguinea S.Hertel & Presser	2014	species	subsp. helleborine	= het.
Epipactis schubertiorum Bartolo, Pulv. & Robatsch	1996	species	subsp. helleborine	= het.
Epipactis squamellosa Schltr.	1919	species	subsp. helleborine	= het.
Epipactis tallosii A.Molnár & Robatsch	1996	species	subsp. helleborine	= het.
Epipactis tallosii subsp. zaupolensis Barbaro & Kreutz	2007	subspecies	subsp. helleborine	= het.
Epipactis tangutica Schltr.	1919	species	subsp. tangutica	≡ hom.
Epipactis tenii Schltr.	1921	species	subsp. helleborine	= het.
Epipactis tremolsii Pau	1914	species	subsp. tremolsii	≡ hom.
Epipactis tremolsii subsp. cardina (Benito & C.E.Hermos.) Kreutz	2005	subspecies	subsp. tremolsii	= het.
Epipactis tremolsii subsp. densifolia (W.Hahn, Passin & R.Wegener) Kreutz	2004	subspecies	subsp. tremolsii	= het.
Epipactis tremolsii subsp. duriensis (Bernardos, D.Tyteca, Revuelta & Amich) Kreutz	2004	subspecies	subsp. tremolsii	= het.
Epipactis tremolsii var. duriensis (Bernardos, D.Tyteca, Revuelta & Amich) P.Delforge	2004	variety	subsp. tremolsii	= het.
Epipactis tremolsii subsp. heraclea (P.Delforge & Kreutz) Kreutz	2004	subspecies	subsp. tremolsii	= het.
Epipactis tremolsii subsp. latina (W.Rossi & E.Klein) S.Hertel & Riech.	2003	subspecies	subsp. tremolsii	= het.
Epipactis tremolsii subsp. lusitanica (D.Tyteca) Kreutz	2004	subspecies	subsp. tremolsii	= het.
Epipactis tremolsii subsp. turcica (Kreutz) Kreutz	2004	subspecies	subsp. tremolsii	= het.
Epipactis tremolsii var. viridiflora J.Benito	1999	variety	subsp. tremolsii	= het.
Epipactis turcica Kreutz	1997	species	subsp. tremolsii	= het.
Epipactis uliginosa Vest	1825	species	subsp. helleborine	= het.
Epipactis viridans var. brevibracteata Zapał.	1906	variety	subsp. helleborine	= het.
Epipactis viridans var. dentata Zapał.	1906	variety	subsp. helleborine	= het.
Epipactis viridans f. humilis Zapał.	1906	form	subsp. helleborine	= het.
Epipactis viridans f. interrupta (Beck) Zapał.	1906	form	subsp. helleborine	= het.
Epipactis viridans var. lancifolia Zapał.	1906	variety	subsp. helleborine	= het.
Epipactis viridans var. lithuanica Zapał.	1906	variety	subsp. helleborine	= het.
Epipactis viridans f. minor Zapał.	1906	form	subsp. helleborine	= het.
Epipactis viridans var. montana Zapał.	1906	variety	subsp. helleborine	= het.
Epipactis viridans var. obtusa Zapał.	1906	variety	subsp. helleborine	= het.
Epipactis viridans f. parviflora Zapał.	1906	form	subsp. helleborine	= het.
Epipactis viridans var. przemysliensis Zapał.	1906	variety	subsp. helleborine	= het.
Epipactis viridans f. remota Zapał.	1906	form	subsp. helleborine	= het.
Epipactis viridans var. subrotundifolia Zapał.	1906	variety	subsp. helleborine	= het.
Epipactis viridiflora Rupr.	1847	species	subsp. helleborine	= het., nom. illeg.
Epipactis voethii Robatsch	1993	species	subsp. helleborine	= het.
Epipactis youngiana A.J.Richards & A.F.Porter	1982	species	subsp. neerlandica	= het.
Epipactis yunnanensis Schltr.	1919	species	subsp. helleborine	= het.
Epipactis zaupolensis (Barbaro & Kreutz) Bongiorni, De Vivo & Fori	2010	species	subsp. helleborine	= het.
Epipactis zirnsackiana Riech.	2010	species	subsp. helleborine	= het.
Helleborine atropurpurea var. tremolsii (Pau) Soó	1927	variety	subsp. tremolsii	≡ hom.
Helleborine atroviridis (Linton) F.Hanb.	1908	species	subsp. helleborine	= het.
Helleborine helleborine (L.) Druce	1924	species	E. helleborine	≡ hom., not validly publ.
Helleborine latifolia (L.) Moench	1802	species	subsp. helleborine	= het.
Helleborine latifolia f. acutiloba (Huter) Graber	1923	form	subsp. helleborine	= het.
Helleborine latifolia f. albiflora Graber	1923	form	subsp. helleborine	= het.
Helleborine latifolia var. angustifolia Druce	1930	variety	subsp. helleborine	= het.
Helleborine latifolia var. atroviridis (Linton) Druce	1930	variety	subsp. helleborine	= het.
Helleborine latifolia f. brevibracteata (Zapał.) Soó	1927	form	subsp. helleborine	= het.
Helleborine latifolia f. dentata (Zapał.) Soó	1927	form	subsp. helleborine	= het.
Helleborine latifolia var. dilatata (Asch. & Graebn.) Graber	1923	variety	subsp. helleborine	= het.
Helleborine latifolia f. dilatata (Asch. & Graebn.) Soó	1927	form	subsp. helleborine	= het.
Helleborine latifolia f. foliosa Graber	1923	form	subsp. helleborine	= het., nom. illeg.
Helleborine latifolia f. interrupta (Beck) Graber	1923	form	subsp. helleborine	= het.
Helleborine latifolia f. lancifolia (Zapał.) Soó	1927	form	subsp. helleborine	= het.
Helleborine latifolia f. montana (Zapał.) Soó	1927	form	subsp. helleborine	= het.
Helleborine latifolia f. obtusa (Zapał.) Soó	1927	form	subsp. helleborine	= het.
Helleborine latifolia subvar. orbicularis (K.Richt.) Graber	1923	subvariety	subsp. helleborine	= het.
Helleborine latifolia f. orbicularis (K.Richt.) Soó	1927	form	subsp. helleborine	= het.
Helleborine latifolia f. parviflora (Zapał.) Soó	1927	form	subsp. helleborine	= het.
Helleborine latifolia subvar. paucifolia Gaille & Graber	1923	subvariety	subsp. helleborine	= het.
Helleborine latifolia subsp. platyphylla (Irmisch) Graber	1923	subspecies	subsp. helleborine	= het.
Helleborine latifolia var. platyphylla (Irmisch) Briq.	1910	variety	subsp. helleborine	= het.
Helleborine latifolia f. przemysliensis (Zapał.) Soó	1927	form	subsp. helleborine	= het.
Helleborine latifolia f. pseudovarians (Engenst.) Soó	1927	form	subsp. helleborine	= het.
Helleborine latifolia f. pycnostachys (K.Koch) Soó	1927	form	subsp. helleborine	= het.
Helleborine latifolia f. pygmaea (W.Zimm.) Soó	1927	form	subsp. helleborine	= het.
Helleborine macrostachya (Lindl.) Soó	1929	species	subsp. helleborine	= het.
Helleborine nephrocardia (Schltr.) Soó	1929	species	subsp. helleborine	= het.
Helleborine orbicularis (K.Richt.) Druce	1908	species	subsp. helleborine	= het.
Helleborine ovalis (Bab.) Druce	1905	species	subsp. helleborine	= het.
Helleborine pycnostachys (K.Koch) Druce	1909	species	subsp. helleborine	= het.
Helleborine squamellosa (Schltr.) Soó	1929	species	subsp. helleborine	= het.
Helleborine tangutica (Schltr.) Soó	1929	species	subsp. tangutica	≡ hom.
Helleborine tenii (Schltr.) Soó	1929	species	subsp. helleborine	= het.
Helleborine varians Soó	1928	species	subsp. helleborine	= het.
Helleborine yunnanensis (Schltr.) Soó	1929	species	subsp. helleborine	= het.
Limodorum latifolium (L.) Kuntze	1891	species	subsp. helleborine	= het., nom. illeg.
Serapias consimilis (D.Don) A.A.Eaton	1908	species	subsp. helleborine	= het.
Serapias helleborine L.	1753	species	E. helleborine	≡ hom., nom. cons.
Serapias helleborine var. latifolia L.	1753	variety	subsp. helleborine	= het.
Serapias latifolia (L.) Huds.	1762	species	subsp. helleborine	= het.
Serapias latifolia var. pallida Rosén & Wahlenb.	1821	variety	subsp. helleborine	= het.
Serapias latifolia var. vulgaris Rosén & Wahlenb.	1821	variety	subsp. helleborine	= het.
Serapias memoralis Salisb.	1796	species	subsp. helleborine	= het., nom. superfl.
Notes: ≡ homotypic synonym; = heterotypic synonym

== Distribution ==
This species is widespread across much of Europe and Asia, from Portugal to China, as well as northern Africa.

In the United Kingdom, the species is widespread and common in England and Wales, but is absent from most of Scotland scattered across Ireland.

In North America, it is an introduced species and widely naturalized mostly in the Northeastern United States, eastern Canada and the Great Lakes Region, but also in scattered locations in other parts of the continent. In the US it is sometimes referred to as the "weed orchid" or "weedy orchid" and continues to spread throughout the country to new areas including Michigan, Wisconsin, and the San Francisco Bay Area.

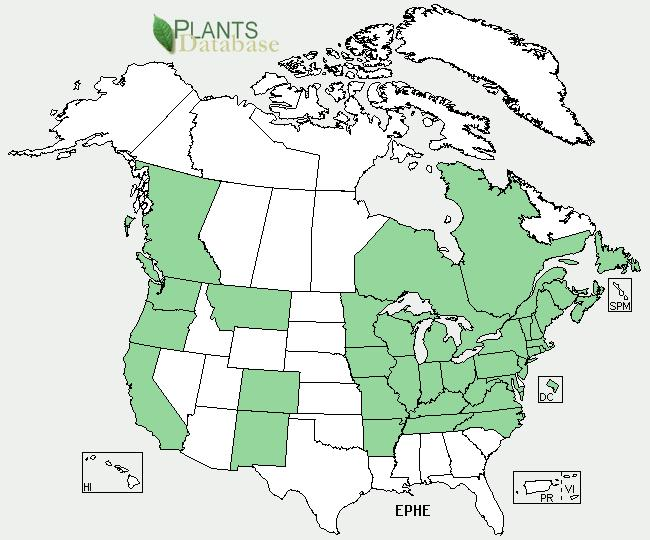
Distribution in North America

== Habitat ==
Found in woods and hedge-banks and often not far from paths near human activity. It is one of the most likely European orchids to be found within a city, with many sites for example in Glasgow, London and Moscow. Sometimes spotted beside car parks.

Epipactis helleborine is known for its successful colonization of human-made or anthropogenic habitats such as parks, gardens or roadsides. These roadside orchids exhibit special features such as large plant size and greater ability to produce flowers. Pollination plays a huge role as pollinators such as Syrphidae, Culicidae, Apidae etc. possess greater species diversity and visits the flowering sites more in anthropogenic habitats as compared to native ones. The visitation rates along with the reproductive success of these orchids are higher in large populations as they are more attractive to pollinators.

== Ecology ==
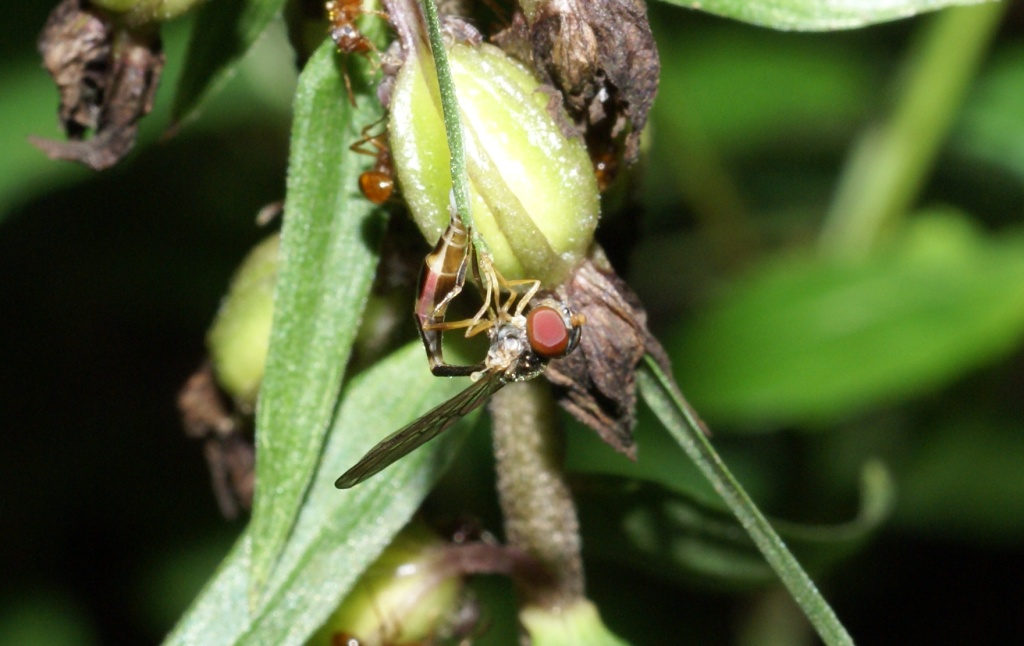
Hoverfly depositing an egg on an Epipactis helleborine leaf as a predatory response to aphids which are farmed by ants.

This species of orchid is pollinated by several species of Hymenoptera, particularly the common wasp, but also other species in the genera Vespula and Dolichovespula. Flowers release a sweet nectar to attract the wasps, which has an intoxicating effect on them. Eight populations of Epipactis helleborine in central Europe (Lower Silesia, Poland) had their nectar studied and they were found to contain naturally occurring oxycodone (as well as another narcotic-like opioid) in minute amounts.

Epipactis helleborine requires a mycorrhizal symbiosis to germinate successfully and remains partially dependent upon the fungus when plants mature, however it is not particularly selective among fungal species. Fungi associated with the live roots include Tuber, Helotiales, Peziza, Leptodontidium, Hydnotrya and Wilcoxina.

It has been suggested that the presence of this orchid species in a woodland is an indicator that edible truffles can be found there, but this is not always the case.

== Chemistry ==
Trace amounts of narcotic compounds have been identified in the plants nectar, namely 3-{2-{3-{3-(benzyloxy)propyl}-3-indol-7,8-didehydro-4,5-epoxy-3,6-D-morphinan and oxycodone.
