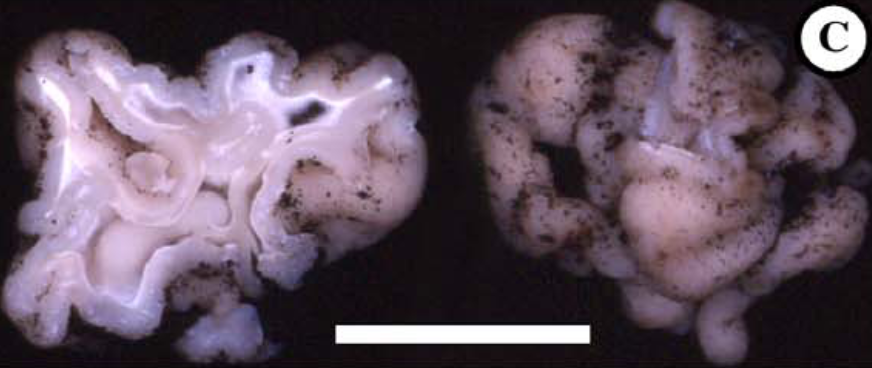
- Gymnohydnotrya sp. collected under Nothofagus pumilio in Argentina. scale bar: 1 cm

Scientific classification
- Kingdom: Fungi
- Division: Ascomycota
- Class: Pezizomycetes
- Order: Pezizales
- Family: Discinaceae
- Genus: Gymnohydnotrya; B.C. Zhang & Minter

Type species
- Gymnohydnotrya australiana B.C. Zhang & Minter

Species
- Gymnohydnotrya australiana; Gymnohydnotrya echinulata; Gymnohydnotrya ellipsospora

= Gymnohydnotrya =

Genus of fungi

Gymnohydnotrya is a genus of ascomycete fungi related to the false morels of the genus Gyromitra.
