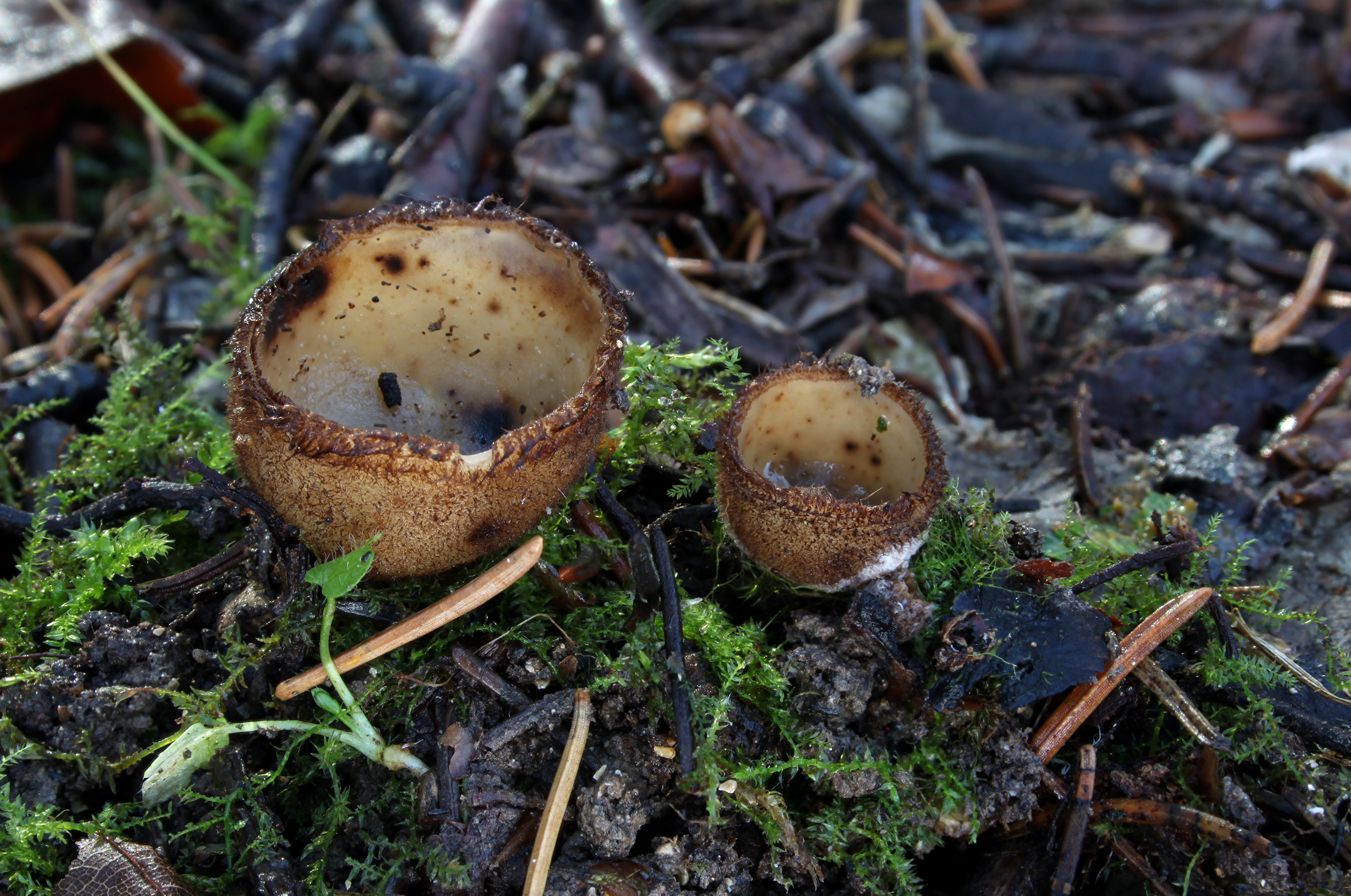

Scientific classification
- Kingdom: Fungi
- Division: Ascomycota
- Class: Pezizomycetes
- Order: Pezizales
- Family: Pyronemataceae
- Genus: Humaria
- Species: H. hemisphaerica

Binomial name
- Humaria hemisphaerica (F.H. Wigg.) Fuckel (1870)

Synonyms
- Peziza hemisphaerica F.H. Wigg. (1780); Lachnea hemisphaerica (F.H. Wigg.) Gillet (1879); Mycolachnea hemisphaerica (F.H. Wigg.) Maire (1937); Peziza hispida Sowerby (1799) nom. illegit.

= Humaria hemisphaerica =

Species of fungus

Humaria hemisphaerica
- Mycological characteristics
- Smooth hymenium
- Hymenium attachment is not applicable
- Lacks a stipe
- Ecology is mycorrhizal
- Edibility is inedible

Humaria hemisphaerica is a species of fungus in the family Humariaceae. In the UK it has the recommended English name of glazed cup; in North America it has been called the hairy fairy cup or the brown-haired fairy cup. Ascocarps (fruit bodies) are cup-shaped and can be recognized by their smooth, white inner surface and hairy, brown outer surface. The species occurs in Europe and North America.

== Taxonomy ==
This species was originally described in 1780 by German mycologist Friedrich Heinrich Wiggers as Peziza hemisphaerica. Elias Magnus Fries placed it within the Lachnea series, a name he applied to cup fungi with hairy apothecia. In 1870 Leopold Fuckel transferred P. hemisphaerica to the genus Humaria.

The specific epithet is derived from the Latin word hemisphaericum, meaning half a sphere.

== Description ==
Humaria hemisphaerica has fruiting bodies (apothecia) that typically measure 5 to 30 millimetres (1/4 to 1 1/8 inches) in diameter by 1 to 1.5 cm (3/8 to 5/8 in) deep. The fruiting bodies are initially spherical and expand to become cuplike at the fungus matures. This species typically does not have a stipe; when it does, it is present as a small abrupt base. The inner surface of the fruiting body (the hymenium) is white, while the outer hairy surface is brown and covered with brown hairs that taper to a sharp point. These hairs are 400–500 x 15–20 μm. The ascospores are elliptical, hyaline, 20–22 x 10–11 μm, and have 2–3 oil droplets.

=== Similar species ===
Similar species of Humaria may exist in North America, but are not circumscribed.

There are several other similar cup fungi in the Pyronemataceae family with hairy exteriors. Jafnea semitotsa is larger (2–5 cm in diameter) with a brown interior and a short stipe. The cups of Trichophaea species are usually less than 1 cm across; Trichophaea boudieri and T. bullata are 1–6 millimetres wide, and T. abundans prefers to grow in burnt areas. Chaetothiersia vernalis grows in a more disclike form, and Wilcoxina rehmii produces tiny discs.

== Distribution and habitat ==
H. hemisphaerica grows year-round on North America's west coast and is common in the Pacific Northwest; further east, it fruits from July to October. Specimens usually grow alone, but also appear scattered or grouped on the ground, and sometimes on decaying wood.

== Toxicity ==
The fungus is inedible.
