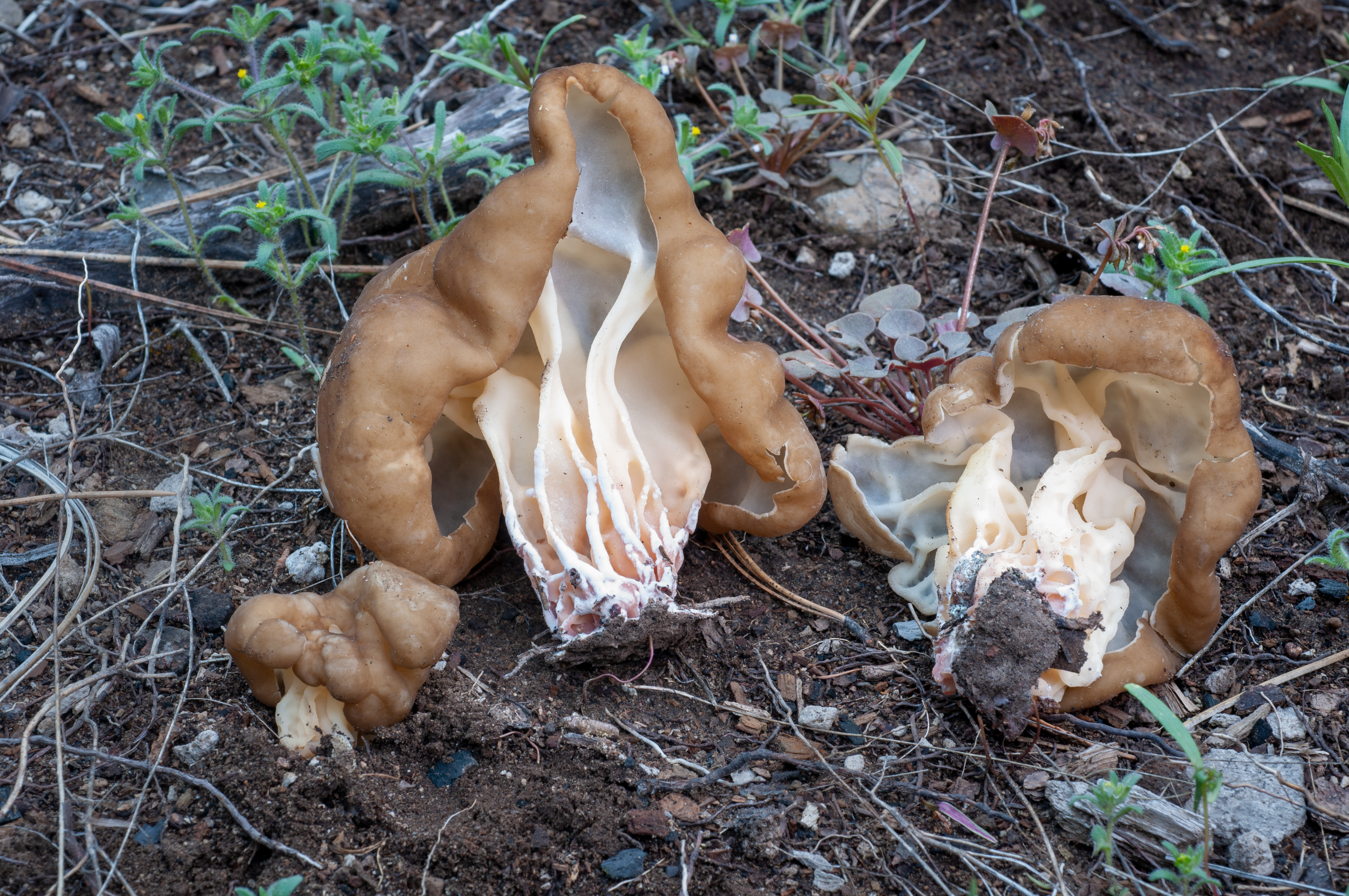

Conservation status
- Apparently Secure (NatureServe)

Scientific classification
- Kingdom: Fungi
- Division: Ascomycota
- Class: Pezizomycetes
- Order: Pezizales
- Family: Discinaceae
- Genus: Gyromitra
- Species: G. californica

Binomial name
- Gyromitra californica (W. Phillips) Raitv. (1965)

Synonyms
- Helvella californica W. Phillips (1879)

= Gyromitra californica =

Species of fungus

Gyromitra californica, commonly known as the umbrella false morel, is a species of fungus in the family Discinaceae. It was described as Helvella californica by W. Phillips in 1879.

== Description ==
Gyromitra californica has a wide, saddle-shaped cap that measures approximately 4 to 12 centimeters wide, reaching up to 16 centimeters when fully expanded. Its cap ranges in color from tan to an olive or grey-brown. The surface of the cap is slightly bumpy and uneven. The underside of the cap is a whitish, cream color and very thin.

The mushroom stalk is approximately 3 to 8 centimeters long and 2 to 5 centimeters thick. It is ribbed all the way up to the underside of the cap and appears waxy. The color of the stalk usually ranges from a cream to a pale-yellow, with a pink or rose colored base.

The Gyromitra californica also has elliptic and smooth spores, which are approximately 13.0-18.0 by 8.0-10.5 microns in size. After reaching maturity, these spores usually produce small oil droplets at their ends.

== Habitat ==
The Gyromitra californica is mostly found in the forests of western North America, ranging through British Columbia and Canada down to Washington, Oregon, and California. Though Gyromitra californica was originally found in California, it is most frequently sighted in the forests of Washington and Oregon.

The Gyromitra californica typically grows in areas with decaying wood and high moisture, like well-rotted wood or near streams or creeks.

== Edibility ==
It is considered probably poisonous. However, poisoning reports do not exist for G. californica and the toxin gyromitrin has not been detected in raw samples. There is no record of this species being widely consumed.

Gyromitra californica
- Mycological characteristics
- Smooth hymenium
- Hymenium attachment is not applicable
- Stipe is bare
- Ecology is saprotrophic
- Edibility is unknown but not recommended
