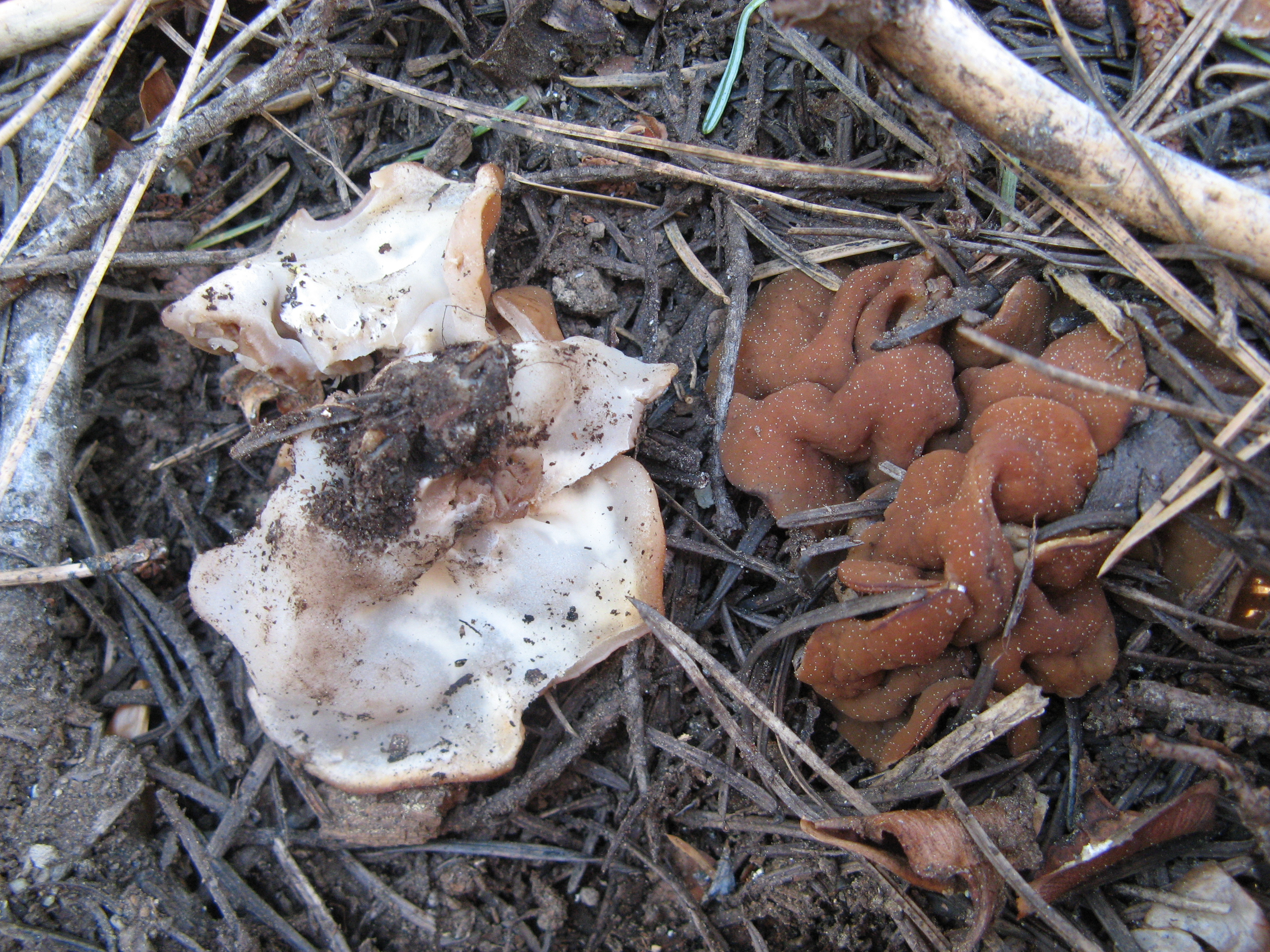
- Fruit bodies found in eastern Shasta-Trinity National Forest, Siskiyou Co., California

Scientific classification
- Kingdom: Fungi
- Division: Ascomycota
- Class: Pezizomycetes
- Order: Pezizales
- Family: Discinaceae
- Genus: Discina
- Species: D. ancilis

Binomial name
- Discina ancilis (Pers.) Sacc. (1889)

Synonyms
- List: Peziza ancilis Pers. (1822); Aleuria ancilis (Pers.) Gillet (1879); Acetabula ancilis (Pers.) Lambotte (1880); Helvella ancilis (Pers.) Quél. (1886); Gyromitra ancilis (Pers.) Kreisel (1984); Peziza perlata Fr. (1822); Discina perlata (Fr.) Fr. (1849); Peziza repanda var. perlata (Fr.) Quél. (1886); Gyromitra perlata (Fr.) Harmaja (1969)

= Discina ancilis =

Species of fungus

Discina ancilis Mycological characteristics
- Smooth hymenium
- Cap is umbilicate
- Hymenium is decurrent
- Stipe is bare
- Spore print is brown
- Ecology is saprotrophic
- Edibility is not recommended or edible

Discina ancilis, commonly known as pig's ears is a brown to tannish, wrinkled, cup- or ear-shaped fungus, sometimes with short, stout stalk.

== Taxonomy ==
The spores of D. ancilis are quite similar to those of mushrooms in the genus Gyromitra, so some mycologists classify it there.

== Description ==
The cup measures 2–10 centimetres (3/4–4 inches) wide, with a disc-like, whitish exterior, and a dark brown to tan interior. The cup is often wrinkled to convoluted, with the edges turned downward. The flesh is brittle. The stipe (when present) is up to 1 cm (3/8 in) long and 3 cm thick; it is whitish to brownish in color.

=== Microscopic characteristics ===
The spores are 25–35 x 11–16 μm, spindle shaped, minutely roughened, with a large central oil drop and two smaller ones at each end.

=== Similar species ===
Disciotis venosa is more deeply veined, and has smooth spores; it is typically found in deciduous woods. Other similar species of Discina must be differentiated microscopically. Peziza repanda is also similar. In the Pacific Northwest, D. leucoxantha and D. olympiana are similar. It also resembles Gyromitra melaleucoides.

== Distribution and habitat ==
It is found singularly or in groups, on humus or rotten wood in coniferous areas; near melting snowbanks in western mountains. It is found in temperate areas of North America. It comes into fruiting from May–July.

== Edibility ==
It is considered edible by some authors, but not others; it can be confused with other potentially toxic species. It should be cooked before consumption.
