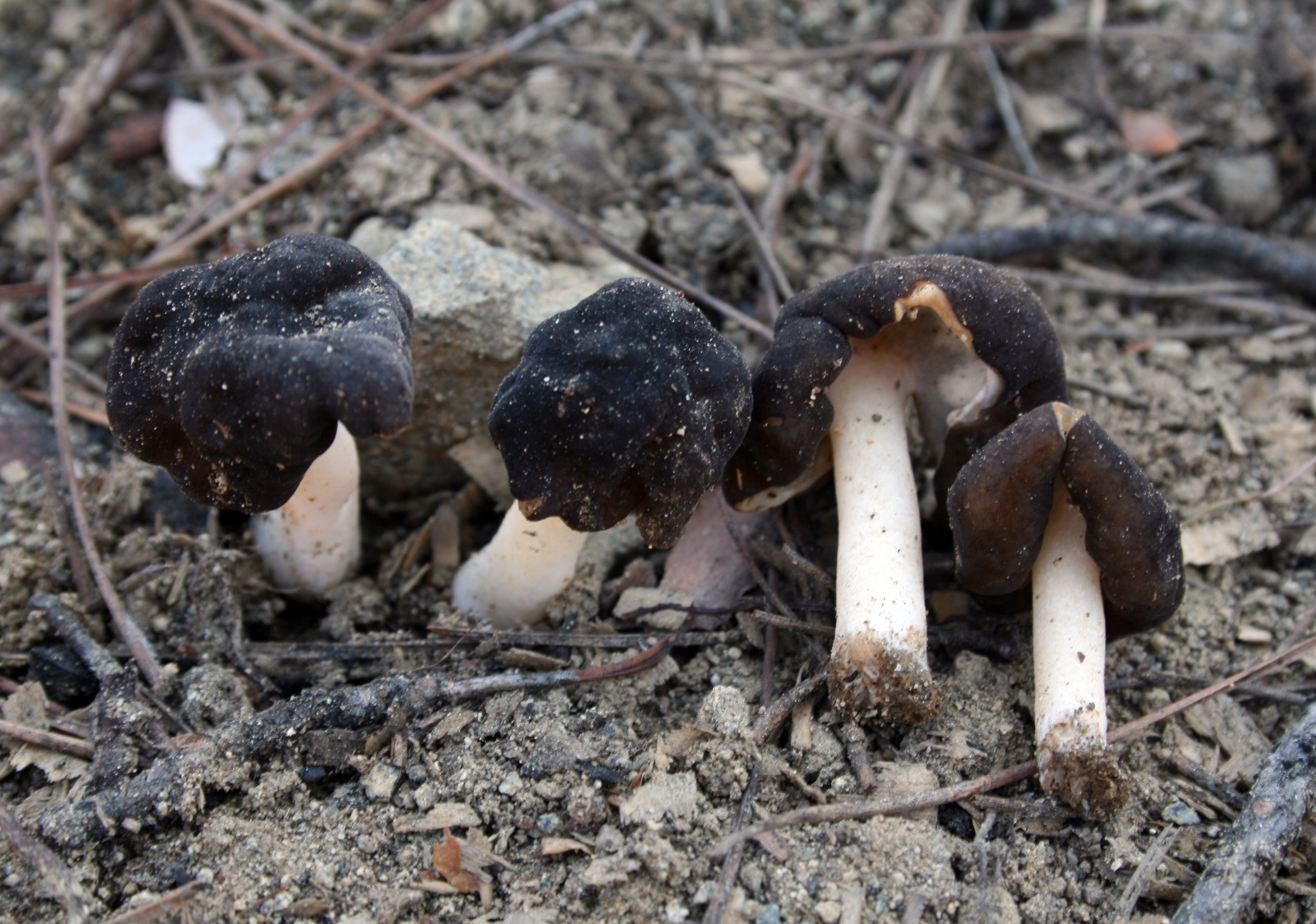

Scientific classification
- Kingdom: Fungi
- Division: Ascomycota
- Class: Pezizomycetes
- Order: Pezizales
- Family: Discinaceae
- Genus: Pseudoverpa (P.A. Moreau, Bellanger, & Loizides) X.C. Wang & W.Y. Zhuang (2023)
- Species: P. anthracobia

Binomial name
- Pseudoverpa anthracobia (Loizides, P.-A. Moreau & Bellanger) X.C. Wang & W.Y. Zhuang (2023)

Synonyms
- Gyromitra anthracobia Loizides, P.-A. Moreau & Bellanger (2018)

= Pseudoverpa =

Pseudoverpa anthracobia

Species of fungus

Pseudoverpa is a newly erected genus of post-fire ascomycete fungi in the family Discinaceae. It is monotypic, being represented by the single species Pseudoverpa anthracobia which was described as new to science in 2018 from recently burned forests on the island of Cyprus.

This fungus can resemble a Verpa species in the field because of its smooth, hollow and distinctly elongated stipe, which is attached to the pileus only at the apex. Its cerebriform (brain-like) pileus, brown-pigmented paraphyses and biguttulate cyanophilic spores, are all typical gyromitroid features, however.

Because of its carbonicolous ecology and isolated phylogenetic position within the genus Gyromitra, G. anthracobia was transferred to the new genus Pseudoverpa in 2023.
