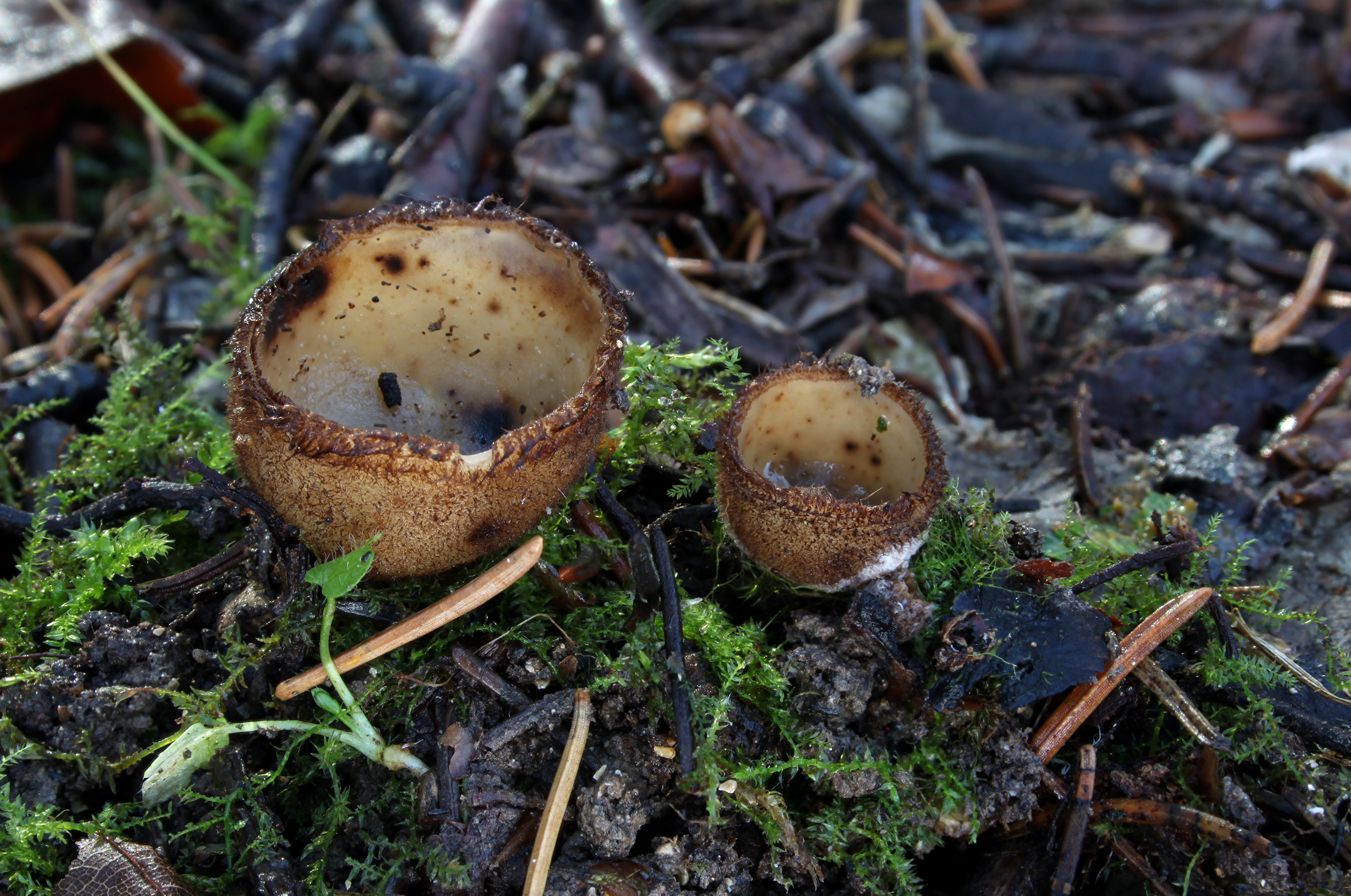
- Humaria hemisphaerica

Scientific classification
- Domain: Eukaryota
- Kingdom: Fungi
- Division: Ascomycota
- Class: Pezizomycetes
- Order: Pezizales
- Family: Pyronemataceae
- Genus: Humaria; Fuckel (1870)

Type species
- Humaria leucoloma (Hedw.) Sacc. (1889)

Synonyms
- Leucopezis Clem. (1909); Mycolachnea Maire (1937)

= Humaria =

Genus of fungi

Humaria is a genus of fungi in the family Pyronemataceae. The genus is widespread in northern temperate areas, and contains 16 species. The genus was circumscribed by Karl Wilhelm Gottlieb Leopold Fuckel in 1870.

== Species ==
- Humaria aurantia
- Humaria haemastigma
- Humaria hemisphaerica
- Humaria irregularis
- Humaria menieri
- Humaria novozeelandica
- Humaria ollaris
- Humaria solsequia
- Humaria stromella
- Humaria velenovskyi
- Humaria violascens
