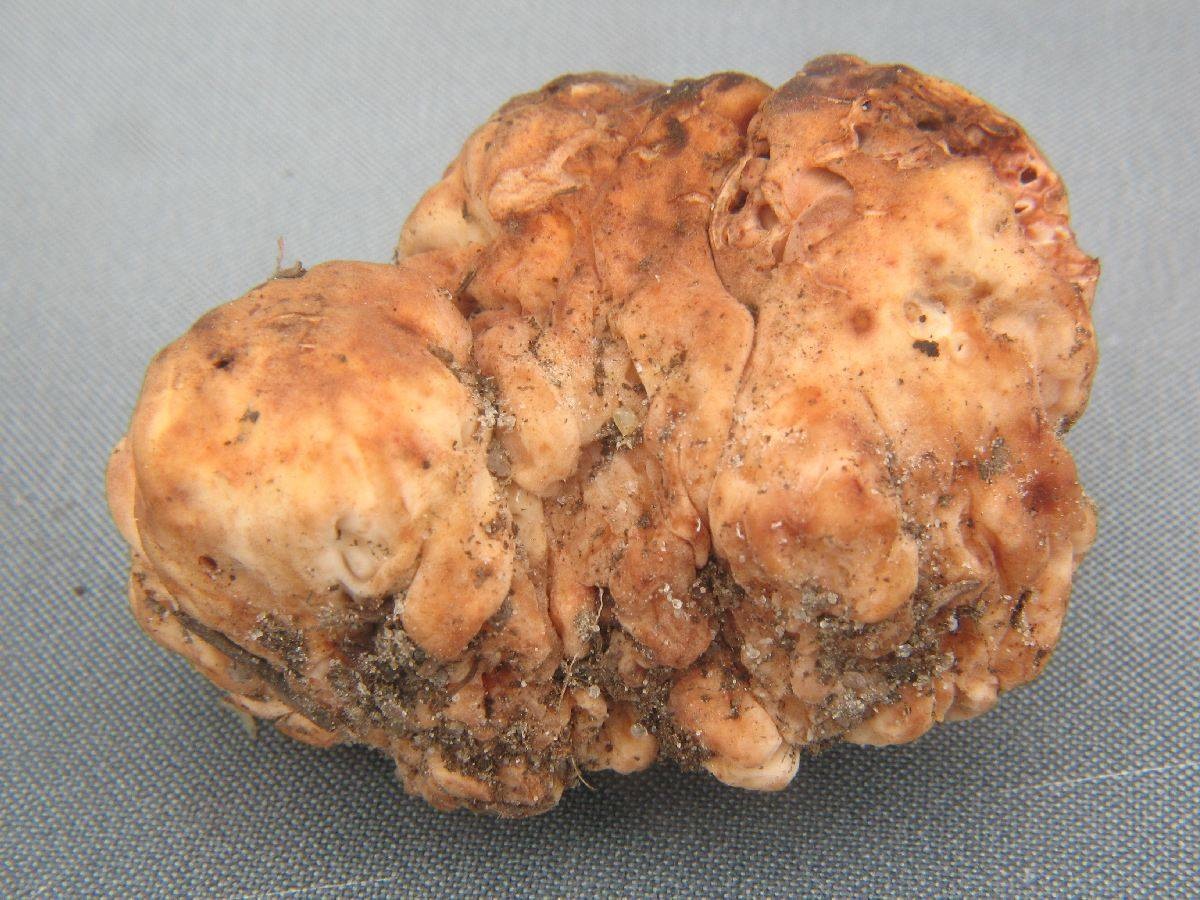

Scientific classification
- Domain: Eukaryota
- Kingdom: Fungi
- Division: Ascomycota
- Class: Pezizomycetes
- Order: Pezizales
- Family: Discinaceae
- Genus: Hydnotrya
- Species: H. tulasnei

Binomial name
- Hydnotrya tulasnei Berk.) Berk. & Broome

= Hydnotrya tulasnei =

Species of fungus

Hydnotrya tulasnei is a species of fungus belonging to the family Discinaceae.

It is native to Europe and Northern America, Japan.
