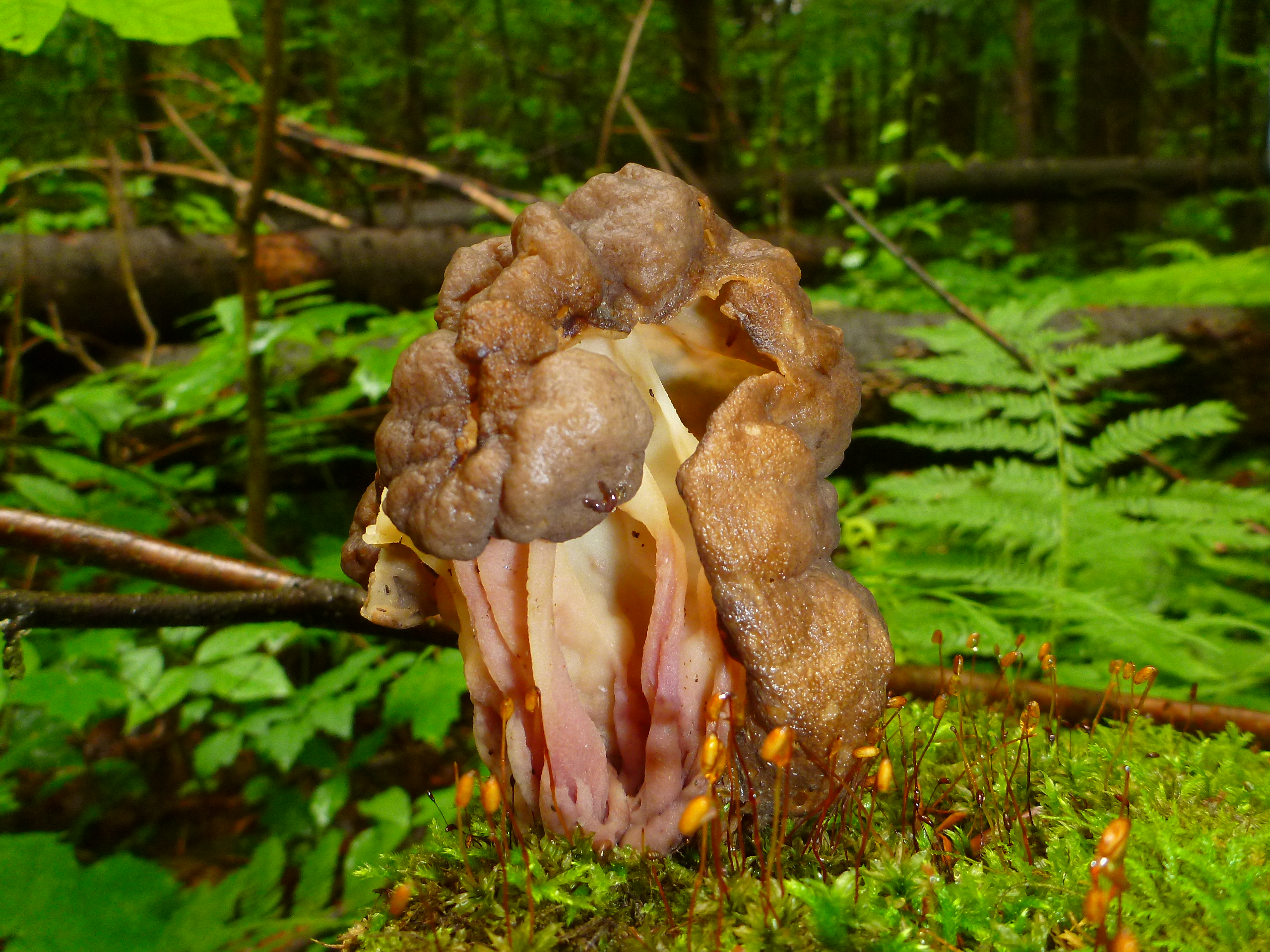
- Pseudorhizina sphaerospora

Scientific classification
- Kingdom: Fungi
- Division: Ascomycota
- Class: Pezizomycetes
- Order: Pezizales
- Family: Discinaceae
- Genus: Pseudorhizina; Jacz. (1913)

Type species
- Pseudorhizina korshinskii Jacz. (1913)

Species
- P. californica P. korshinskii P. sphaerospora

Synonyms
- Helvellella S.Imai (1932); Ochromitra Velen. (1934); Gyromitrodes Vassilkov (1942)

= Pseudorhizina =

Genus of fungi

Pseudorhizina is a genus of ascomycete fungi related to the false morels of the genus Gyromitra. The type species is Pseudorhizina korshinskii, the genus being erected in 1913. Known as the umbrella false morel, P. californica is a well-known species of western North America.
