= Discina =

Discina may refer to:

- Discina (fungus), a genus of ascomycete fungi
- Discina (brachiopod), an extinct brachiopod genus in the family Discinidae
- DisCina, a French cinema distribution company
