= Wilcoxina rehmii =

Scientific classification
- Domain: Eukaryota
- Kingdom: Fungi
- Division: Ascomycota
- Class: Pezizomycetes
- Order: Pezizales
- Family: Pyronemataceae
- Genus: Wilcoxina
- Species: W. rehmii

Binomial name
- Wilcoxina rehmii Chin S. Yang & Korf

Species of fungus

Wilcoxina rehmii is an ascomycete fungus of the Peziza group. It was first described in 1985. It has been identified in France, Kyrgyzstan, Canada, and the United States.
