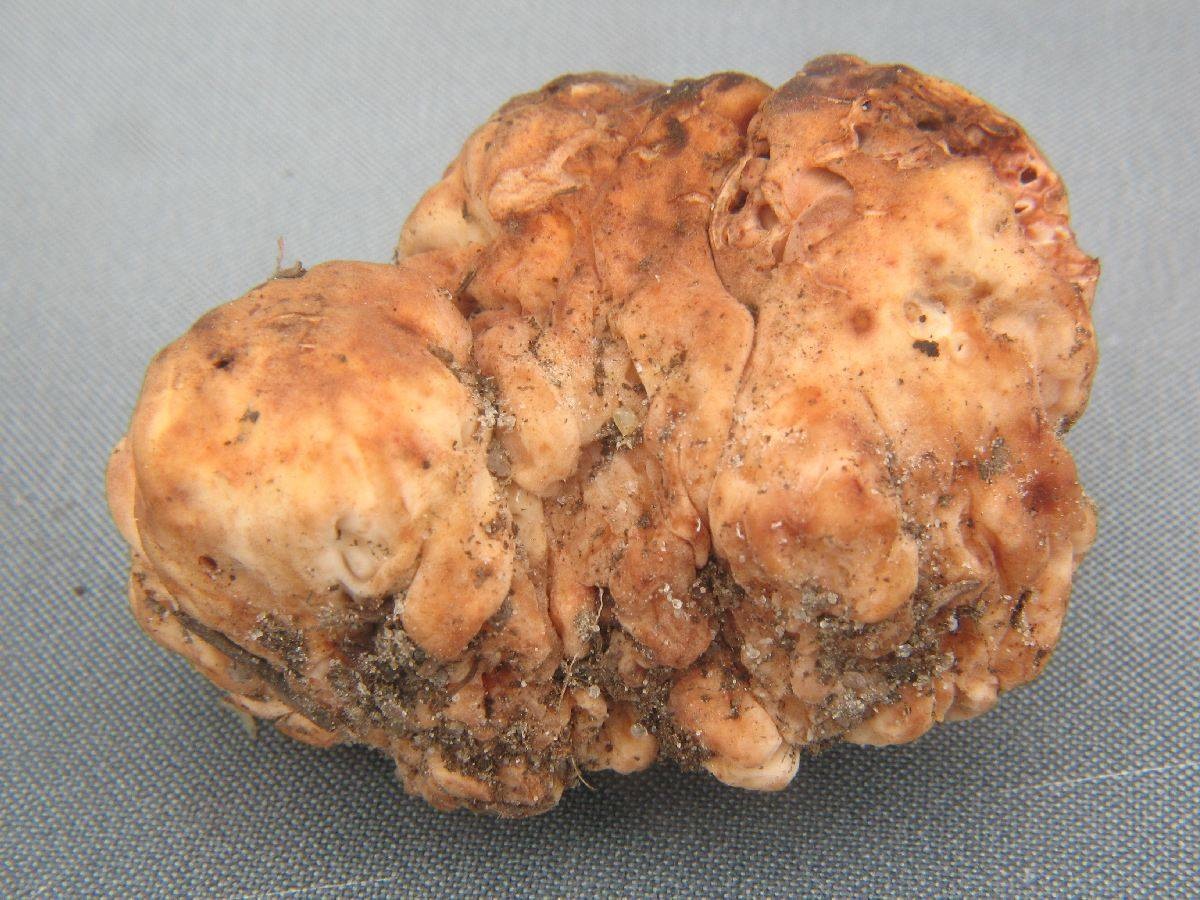
- Hydnotrya tulasnei

Scientific classification
- Domain: Eukaryota
- Kingdom: Fungi
- Division: Ascomycota
- Class: Pezizomycetes
- Order: Pezizales
- Family: Discinaceae
- Genus: Hydnotrya; Berk. & Broome (1846)

Type species
- Hydnotrya tulasnei (Berk.) Berk. & Broome (1846)

Synonyms
- Geoporella Soehner (1951); Gyrocratera Henn. (1899)

= Hydnotrya =

Genus of fungi

Hydnotrya is a genus of ascomycete fungi related to the false morels of the genus Gyromitra. There are about 15 species in the genus. A molecular phylogenetic study recovered a species that was described but neglected for 50 years, Hydnotrya bailii.

== Species ==
- Hydnotrya bailii
- Hydnotrya cerebriformis
- Hydnotrya confusa
- Hydnotrya cubispora
- Hydnotrya inordinata
- Hydnotrya michaelis
- Hydnotrya soehneri
- Hydnotrya subnix
- Hydnotrya tulasnei
- Hydnotrya variiformis
