= Wilcoxina =

Scientific classification
- Domain: Eukaryota
- Kingdom: Fungi
- Division: Ascomycota
- Class: Pezizomycetes
- Order: Pezizales
- Family: Pyronemataceae
- Genus: Wilcoxina; Chin S.Yang & Korf (1985)

Type species
- Wilcoxina mikolae (Chin S.Yang & H.E.Wilcox) Chin S.Yang & Korf (1985)

Species
- W. alaskana; W. mikolae; W. rehmii; W. sequoia

Genus of fungi

Wilcoxina is a genus of fungi in the family Pyronemataceae. It was circumscribed by Chin Yang and Richard Korf in 1985. Some species have been shown to produce the siderophore compound ferricrocin.

Species are cosmopolitan in distribution, and have been found growing with host plants in a wide variety on environments, such as nursery soils with high pH, mining sites with low pH and heavy metal contamination, natural forests and plantations, urban areas and peat soils. Wilcoxina species are mycorrhizal, and commonly infect a variety of conifers and deciduous trees such as Pinus, Betula, and Quercus species.
