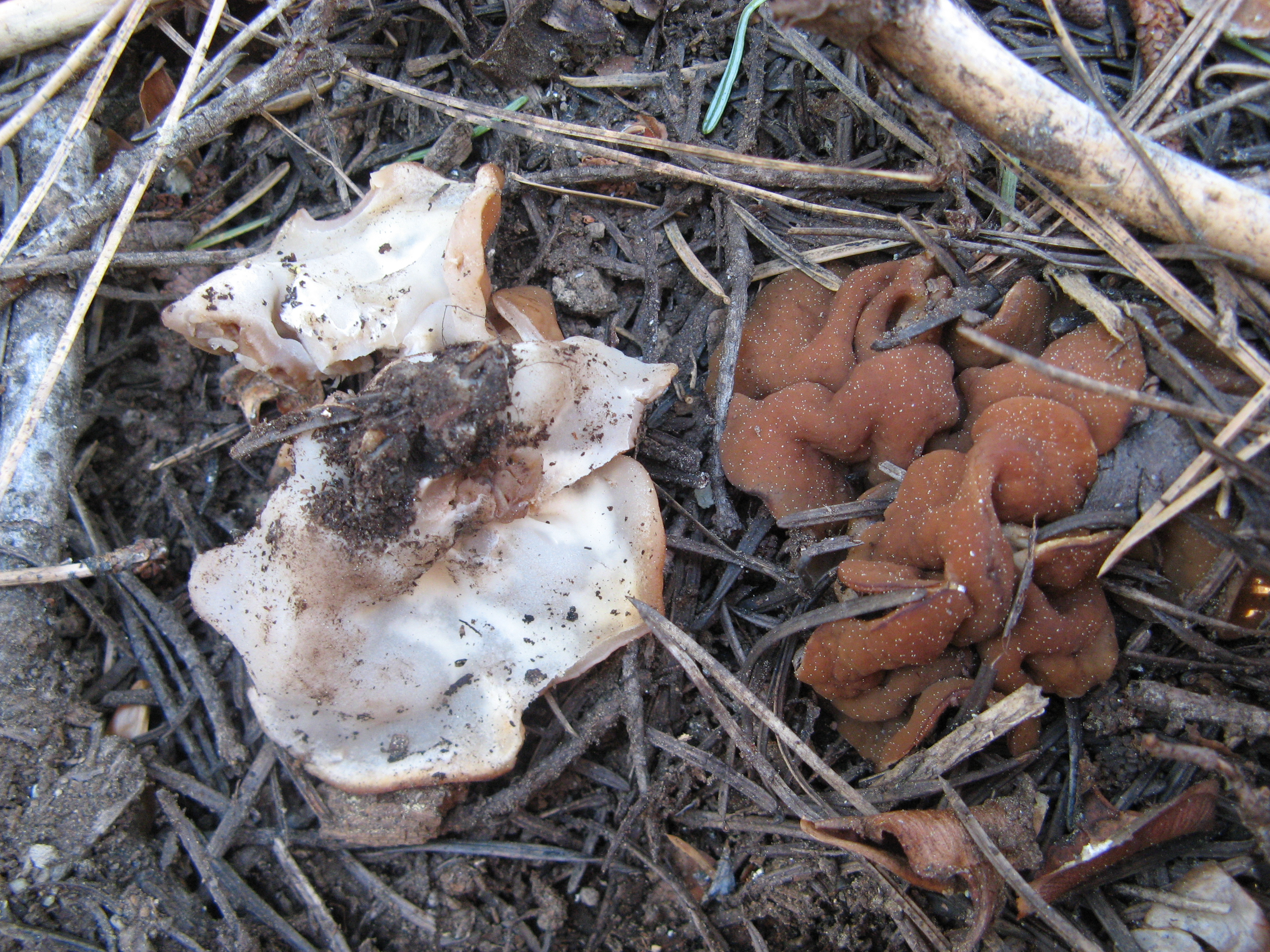
- Discina perlata, member of the Discinaceae

Scientific classification
- Kingdom: Fungi
- Division: Ascomycota
- Class: Pezizomycetes
- Order: Pezizales
- Family: Discinaceae; Benedix (1962)

Type genus
- Discina (Fr.) Fr. (1849)

Genera
- Discina; Gymnohydnotrya; Gyromitra; Hydnotrya; Maublancomyces; Paragyromitra; Pseudorhizina; Pseudoverpa

= Discinaceae =

Family of fungi

The Discinaceae are a family of ascomycete fungi, the best known members of which are the false morels of the genus Gyromitra. Originally erected by Erich Heinz Benedix in 1961, it was found to be a discrete clade in a molecular study of ribosomal DNA by mycologist Kerry O'Donnell in 1997. As of 2008, the family is thought to contain 5 genera and 58 species. As of 2022, the GBIF accepts Discina (Fr.) Fr. (27 spp), Gymnohydnotrya B.C.Zhang & Minter, 1989 (4 spp), Gyromitra Fr., 1849 (73 spp), Hydnotrya Berk. & Broome (52 spp) and Maublancomyces (1 sp). But calls Neogyromitra S.Imai and Pseudorhizina Jacz. doubtful.

Members in the family Discinaceae are known to have epigeous and hypogeous species, and are characterized by ascomata composed of an inner layer of interwoven hyphae and an outer layer composed of elongated cells arranged perpendicular to its exterior. Discinaceae include species possessing saddle-shaped apothecia and hypogeous truffles. Discinaceae possess cylindrical, 8-spored, tapered asci and ascospores that can be elliptical, globose or fusoid. Discinaceae exhibit various morphological traits, such as disc-shaped fruiting bodies, brain-like stalks, and saddle-shaped caps. Discinaceae has been proposed as a sister lineage with Morchellaceae, but is only supported by similarities in morphologic traits. Members such as Hydnotrya tulasnei are known to form ectomycorrhizal relationships with broadleaf and conifer trees in the Northern Hemisphere. Discinaceae abundance has been found to significantly correlate by forest type, such as the abundance of Hydnotrya in black truffle-producing riparian forests in Serbia.
