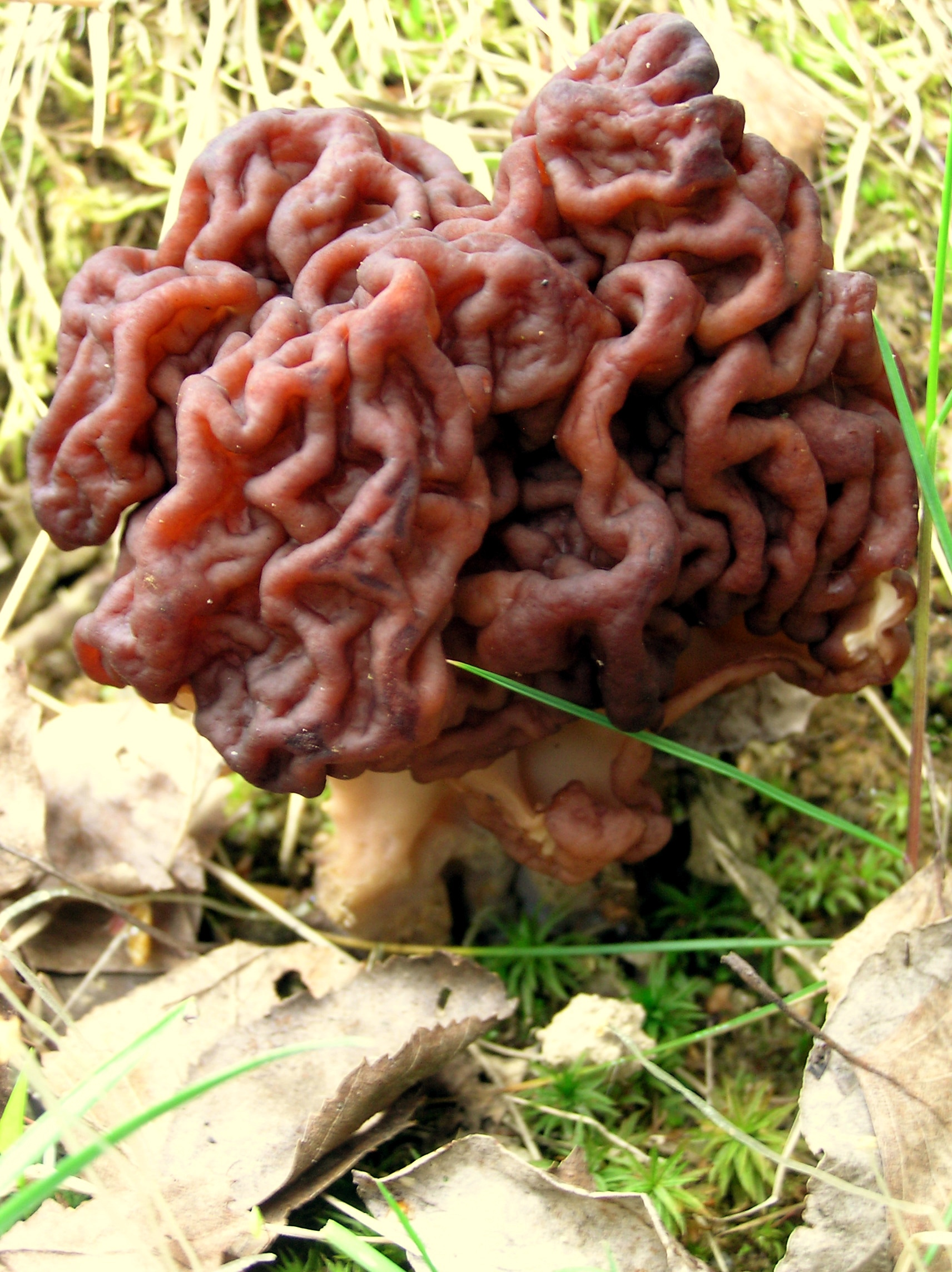
- Gyromitra esculenta

Scientific classification
- Kingdom: Fungi
- Division: Ascomycota
- Class: Pezizomycetes
- Order: Pezizales
- Family: Discinaceae
- Genus: Gyromitra; Fr. (1849)

Type species
- Gyromitra esculenta (Pers.) Fr. (1849)

Species
- See text

= Gyromitra =

Genus of fungi

Gyromitra (/ˌdʒaɪroʊˈmaɪtrə, ˌdʒɪrə-/) is a genus of about 18 species of ascomycete fungi. They are a false morel - a frequently toxic mushroom that can be mistaken for edible mushrooms of the genus Morchella (morels).

== Taxonomy ==
The name Gyromitra comes from gyro meaning convoluted and mitra meaning turban.

Analysis of the ribosomal DNA of many of the Pezizales showed the genus Gyromitra to be most closely related to the genus Discina, and also Pseudorhizina, Hydnotrya, and only distantly related to Helvella. Thus the four genera are now included in the family Discinaceae.

=== Species ===
The genus consists of the following species:

- Gyromitra accumbens Harmaja (1986)
- Gyromitra apiculatula (McKnight) Berthet (1972)
- Gyromitra arctica Vassilkov (1969)
- Gyromitra bubakii Velen. (1922)
- Gyromitra californica (W. Phillips) Raitv. (1965)
- Gyromitra chirripoensis L.D. Gómez (1972)
- Gyromitra columbiana Harmaja (1986)
- Gyromitra convoluta (Seaver) Van Vooren (2009)
- Gyromitra discinoides (S. Imai) S. Imai (1954)
- Gyromitra esculenta Pers. ex Fr. (1849) – a false morel
- Gyromitra fluctuans (Nyl.) Harmaja (1986)
- Gyromitra grandis (A. Cumino) Van Vooren & M. Carbone (2019)
- Gyromitra intermedia (Benedix) Harmaja (1976)
- Gyromitra korfii (Raitv.) Harmaja (1973)
- Gyromitra korshinskii (Jacz.) P.M. Kirk (2015)
- Gyromitra labyrinthica Fr. (1871)
- Gyromitra lactea J.Z. Cao, L. Fan & B. Liu (1990)
- Gyromitra larryi (McKnight) Harmaja (1976)
- Gyromitra leucoxantha (Bres.) Harmaja (1969)
- Gyromitra longipes Harmaja (1979)
- Gyromitra macrospora (Bubák) Harmaja (1973)
- Gyromitra mcknightii Harmaja (1986)
- Gyromitra microspora (Donadini) Harmaja (1986)
- Gyromitra neuwirthii Velen. (1922)
- Gyromitra olympiana (Kanouse) Harmaja (1973)
- Gyromitra parma (J. Breitenb. & Maas Geest.) Kotl. & Pouzar (1974)
- Gyromitra pratensis Velen. (1934)
- Gyromitra recurva (Snyder) Harmaja (1978)
- Gyromitra sichuanensis Korf & W.Y. Zhuang (1985)
- Gyromitra slonevskii V.P. Heluta (2001)
- Gyromitra sphaerospora (Peck) Sacc. (1889)
- Gyromitra spinosospora (Lucchini & Pelland.) A. Koch, Christan & Lohmeyer (1996)
- Gyromitra splendida Raitv. (1974)
- Gyromitra suspecta (Krombh.) J. Schröt. (1893)
- Gyromitra tasmanica Berk. & Cooke (1878)
- Gyromitra venenata Hai J. Li, Z.H. Chen & Zhu L. Yang (2020)
- Gyromitra warnei (Peck) Harmaja (1973)

== Toxicity ==
Some species of the genus Gyromitra are highly poisonous when eaten raw due to the presence of gyromitrin, although some are edible when cooked and Gyromitra spp. are sought after in Scandinavian countries. Widespread hemolysis has been reported from ingestion which can result in kidney failure. Methemoglobinemia has also been seen, although it is typically responsive to treatment with methylene blue. Seizures can also develop via inhibition of the neurotransmitter GABA.

Amyotrophic lateral sclerosis in Montchavin, a mountainous village in the French Alps is associated with a history of eating wild fungi (false morels) collected locally and erroneously reported as Gyromitra gigas.
