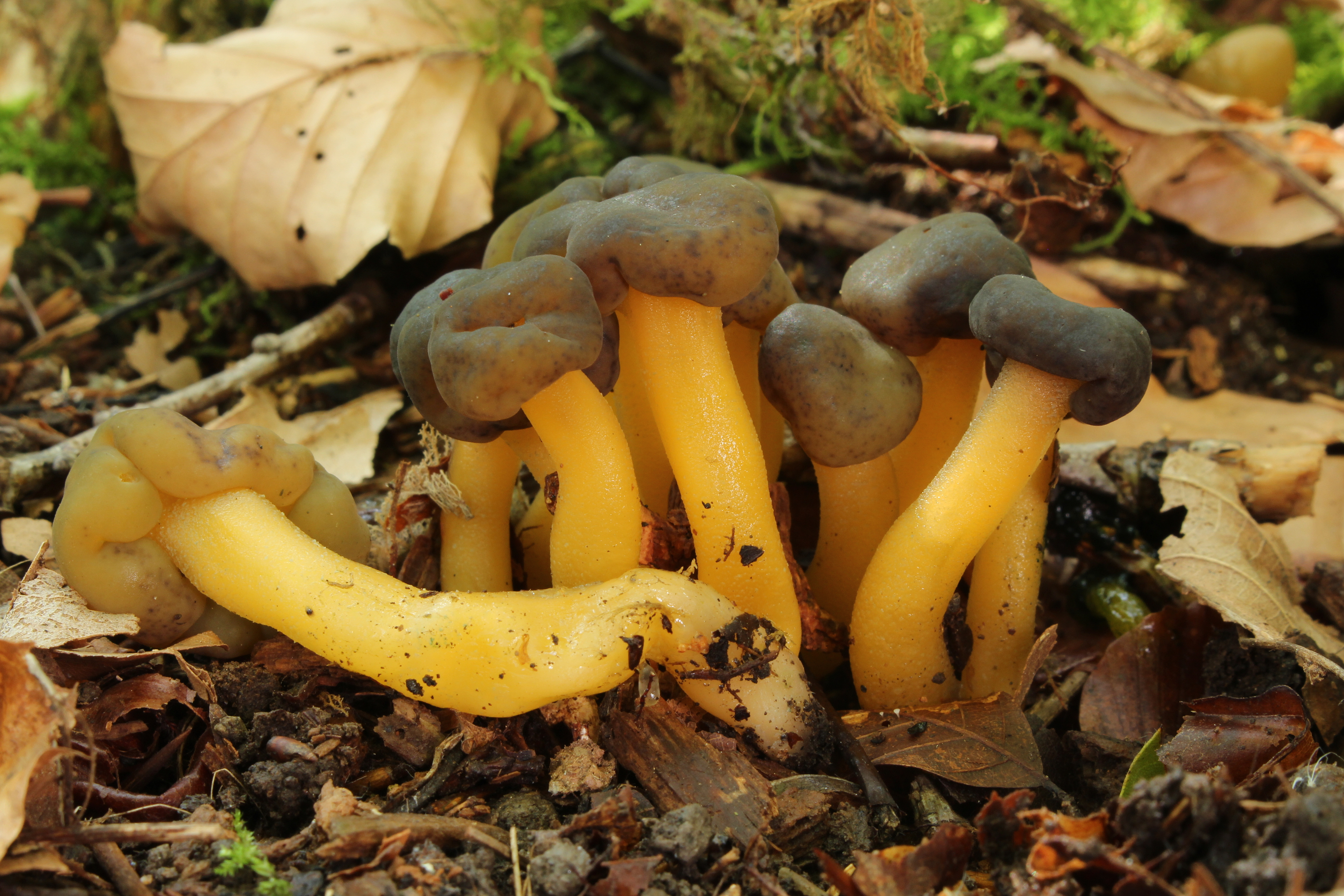

Scientific classification
- Kingdom: Fungi
- Division: Ascomycota
- Class: Leotiomycetes
- Order: Leotiales
- Family: Leotiaceae
- Genus: Leotia
- Species: L. lubrica

Binomial name
- Leotia lubrica (Scop.) Pers. (1797)

Synonyms
- Helvella lubrica Scop. (1772); Peziza cornucopiae Hoffm. (1790)

= Leotia lubrica =

Species of fungus

Leotia lubrica
- Mycological characteristics
- Smooth hymenium
- Cap is convex
- Hymenium attachment is irregular or not applicable
- Stipe is bare
- Ecology is saprotrophic or mycorrhizal
- Edibility is inedible or deadly

Leotia lubrica, commonly referred to as jelly baby, is a species of fungus in the family Leotiaceae. L. lubrica was first validly described by Giovanni Antonio Scopoli, but it was later transferred to Leotia by Christiaan Hendrik Persoon. Its relationship with other members of the genus, of which it is the type species, is complicated.

The species produces small fruit bodies up to 6 centimetres (2 1/2 in) in height, featuring a head and a stalk. The youngest fruit bodies are small and conical, but the fertile head quickly grows from the stalk. Ochre with tints of olive-green, the heads are irregularly shaped, while the stalk, of a similar colour, attaches them to the ground. The appearance can be somewhat variable and is similar to a number of other species, including Cudonia confusa, C. circinans, L. atrovirens and L. viscosa.

L. lubrica has been recorded in Europe, Asia, North America, and Australasia. Growing in woodland among moss, plant detritus or other habitats, the fruit bodies are typically found in large numbers, though they can grow in tight clumps or even individually. The species may feed as a saprotroph or possibly obtains nutrition from living trees through ectomycorrhizae. It is often described as inedible, despite its common name, but has occasionally been reported as a good edible.

== Taxonomy ==
The first species was first validly described scientifically by Giovanni Antonio Scopoli in 1772. Scopoli either named the species Elvella lubrica or Helvella lubrica, with the specific name lubrica meaning 'slimy'. Christiaan Hendrik Persoon transferred the species to Leotia, where it remains, in 1794. Other synonyms include Leotia gelatinosa, used by John Hill in 1751, (Note: Though this description was earlier than Scopoli's, it is not valid, as it was published before Carl Linnaeus's Species Plantarum. See binomial nomenclature.) Helvella gelatinosa, used in Jean Baptiste François Pierre Bulliard's Histoire des champignons de la France, and Peziza cornucopiae, a name given by Georg Franz Hoffmann in 1790. The fruit bodies of the mushrooms are typically referred to as jelly babies, but other common names include the lizard tuft, the ochre jelly club, the slippery cap, the green slime fungus, and the gumdrop fungus. The term "yellow jelly babies" is sometimes used to differentiate the species from green jelly babies, Leotia viscosa.

Leotia lubrica is the type species of the genus Leotia. It has been hypothesised that the species has a close relationship with L. atrovirens; mycologist Geoffrey Kibby suggested that greenish color of L. atrovirens may be due to infection by an imperfect fungus on L. lubrica, while David Arora proposed that the two species may intergrade. In 2004, results of phylogenetic analysis suggested that L. lubrica, L. atrovirens and L. viscosa, while morphologically well-defined, were not monophyletic. L. lubrica specimens could be split into at least two different groups, one of which also contained specimens of L. viscosa. These groups could be differentiated morphologically by the colour of the stalk when dried. The most basal was shown to be L. atrovirens.

== Description ==
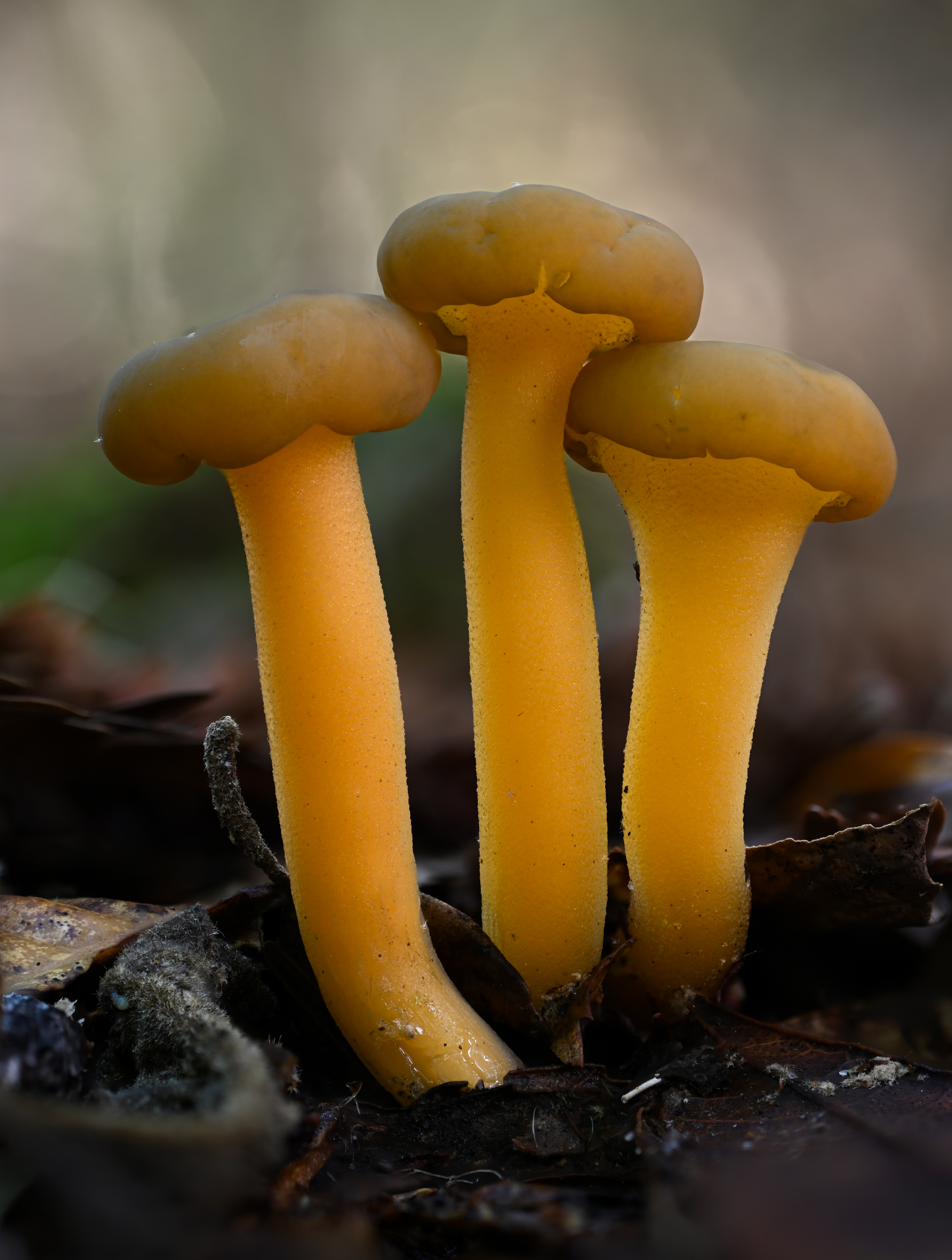
L. lubrica fruit bodies

Leotia lubrica produces fruit bodies which range from 1 to 6 centimetres (1/2 to 2 1/4 inches) in height. The youngest fruit bodies are conical in shape. When the body reaches around 2 millimetres (1/16 in) in length, the tip of the cone begins to expand, forming the head. This is the stage at which the hymenium becomes differentiated from the rest of the body, and the bodies quickly reach their mature form, maturing only through growth after that point.

Each fruit body has a single fertile head measuring 1–3 cm (1/2–1 1/4 in) across, which is an olive-greenish ochre and gelatinous. To the touch, the surface of the head can be smooth, clammy or slimey. While in shape it is convex, the head is made up of irregular lobes and undulations, and the edge is rolled inward. The underside is paler in colour than the upper surface, and smooth. The head is attached to a central stalk, which ranges from 2–8 cm (3/4–3 1/8 in) and 3–10 mm (1/8–3/8 in) wide, though thinner toward the substrate. The stalk is typically cylindrical, but can be flattened, and occasionally has furrows. The colour is similar to that of the head, though more yellow, and the surface is covered in very small granules of a greenish colour. The flesh is gelatinous in the head, while the stalk is mostly hollow, but it can be filled with gel. It has no discernible smell or taste.

=== Microscopic features ===
L. lubrica spores are borne in asci measuring around 150 by 10–12 micrometres (μm). They are club-shaped, and each ascus typically bears eight spores. The asci are inoperculate, meaning that they lack a "lid" and must split to release their spores. The elongated ascospores themselves measure 20 to 25 by 5 to 6 μm, and are subfusiform, that is, they taper slightly at each end. The surface is smooth, and they can be curved, and the spores typically contain four small drops of oil. The mature spores are septate; that is, they are divided by several septa throughout their length, with 5 to 7 partitions typical, and hyaline. The threadlike, colourless paraphyses measure 105 to 124 by 1.8 to 2.8 μm.

=== Similar species ===
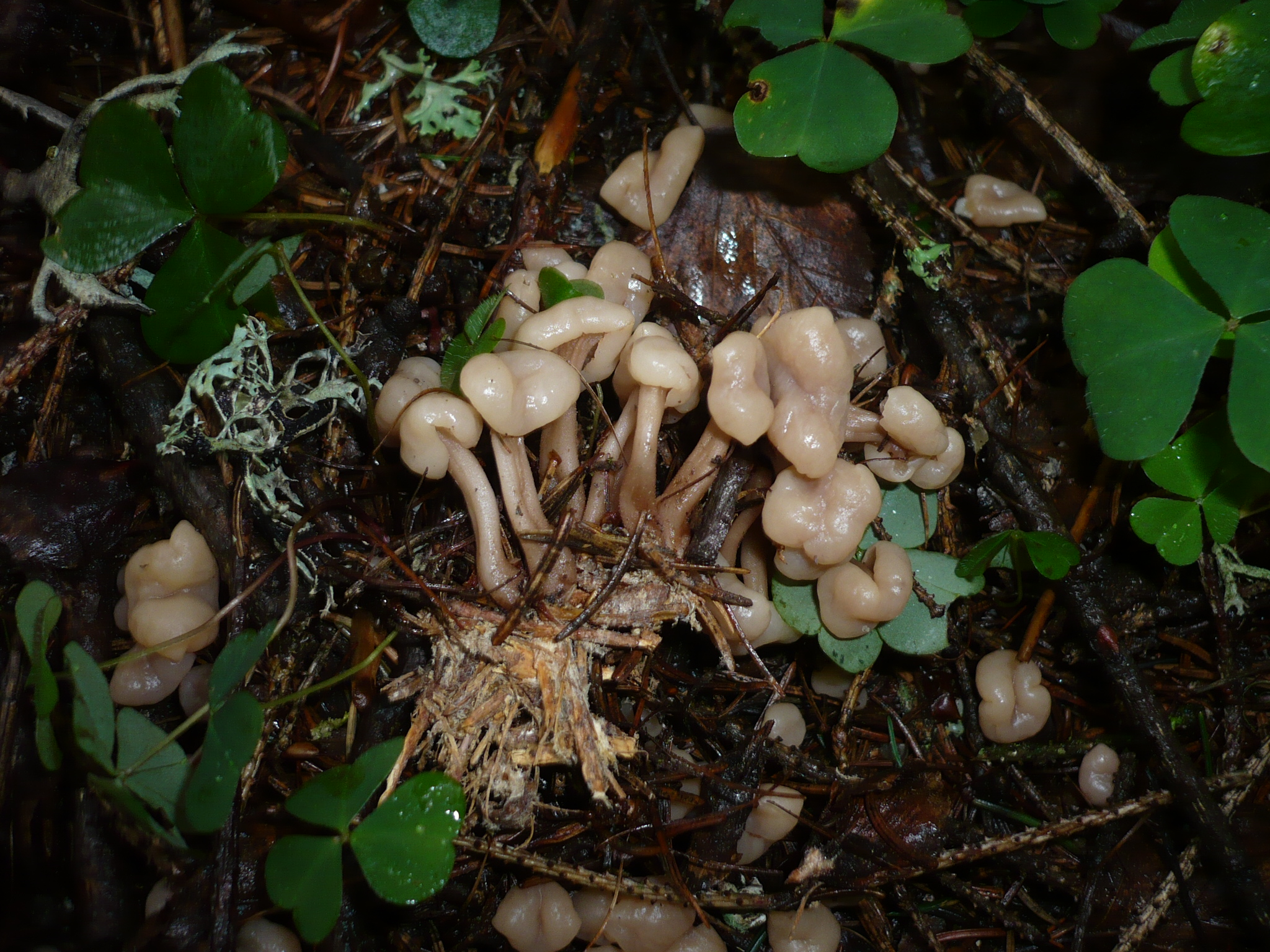
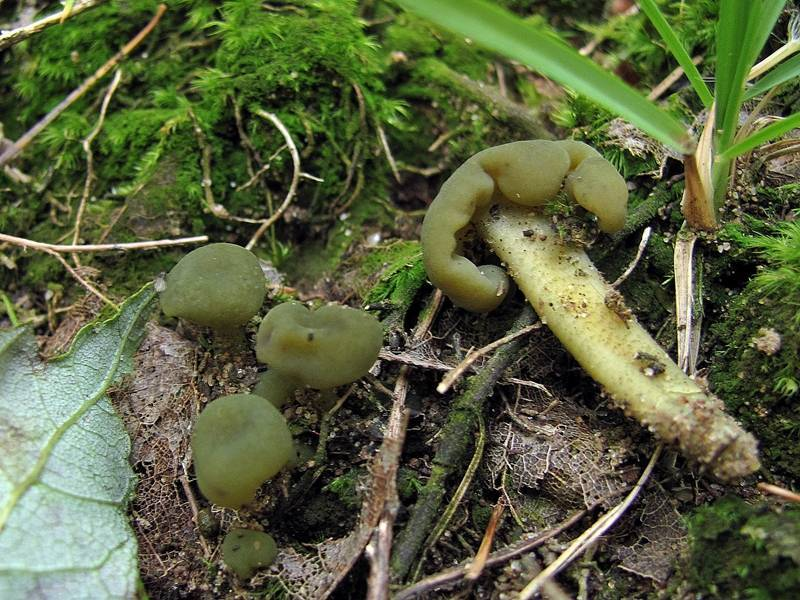
Lookalike species: Cudonia confusa (left) and Leotia atrovirens (right)

L. lubrica fruit bodies are similar to those of Cudonia confusa, commonly known as the cinnamon jellybaby. The species can be differentiated by the fact that L. lubrica fruit bodies are more sturdy, and those of C. confusa are much paler in colour. Another Cudonia species, C. circinans (which is highly similar to C. lutea), is similar to L. lubrica, though it can be differentiated by its colour (which is more brown), spores (which are smaller and thinner) and texture (which is less slimy and gelatinous than L. lubrica). L. lubrica fruit bodies can also be mistaken for those of the much rarer L. atrovirens, which can be differentiated by its darker colouration. L. viscosa can again be differentiated by colouration; the species has a green head, although L. lubrica fruit bodies can also be greenish.

== Distribution and habitat ==
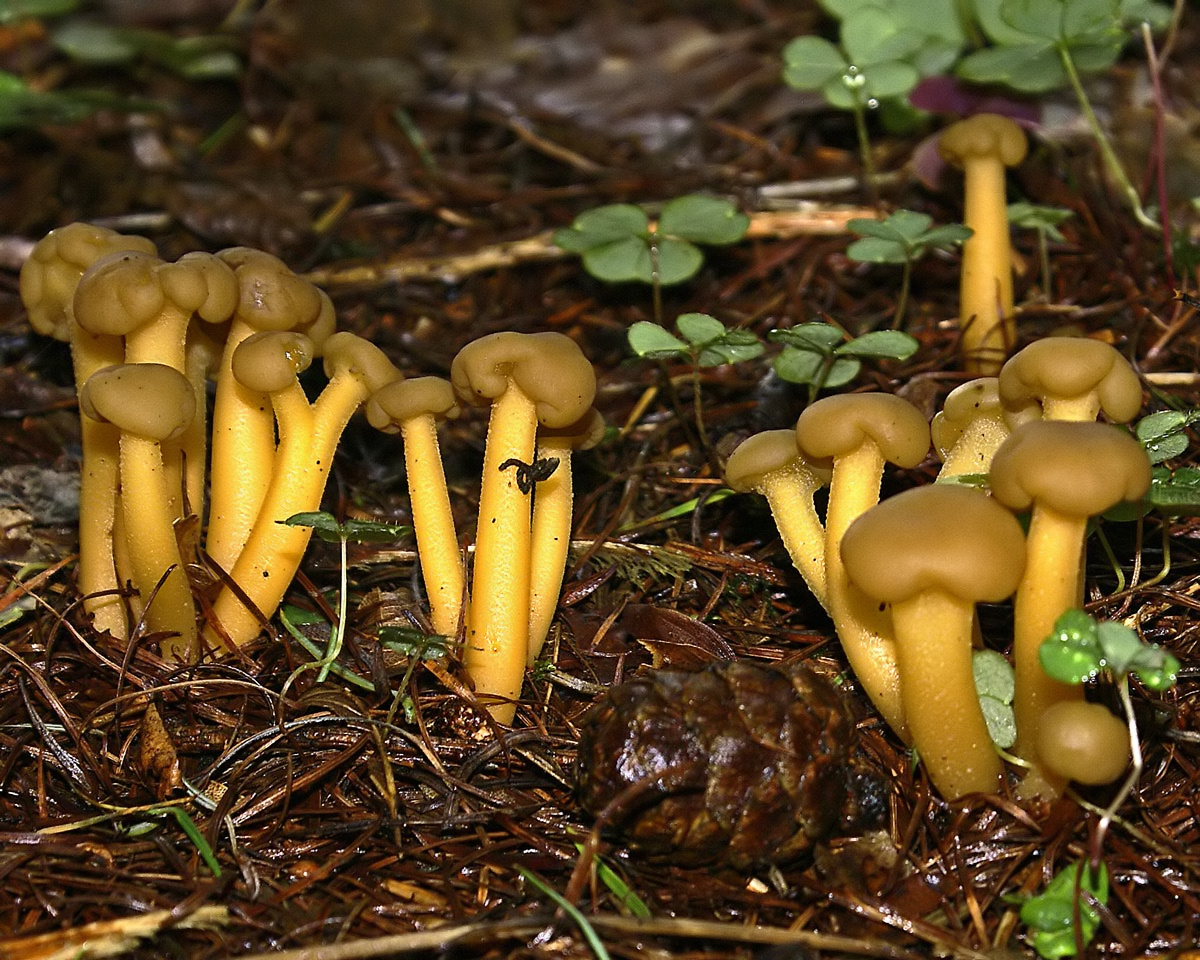
L. lubrica fruit bodies grow in large numbers, typically on soil, moss or plant waste.

Fruit bodies are typically encountered from late summer to late autumn in Europe, and from late spring to autumn in North America, where it is the most common Leotia species. It has also been recorded in eastern Asia, in China and Tibet, as well as in New Zealand and Australia.

L. lubrica favours damp deciduous woodland, but can also be found under conifers. Particular favoured habitats include path sides and underneath bracken, while favoured substrates include soil, moss and plant waste.

Fruit bodies are typically found growing in large numbers, sometimes in clumps, though solitary specimens are occasionally encountered. Several bodies can be connected at their bases, or younger bodies can grow out of the bases of older ones.

== Ecology ==
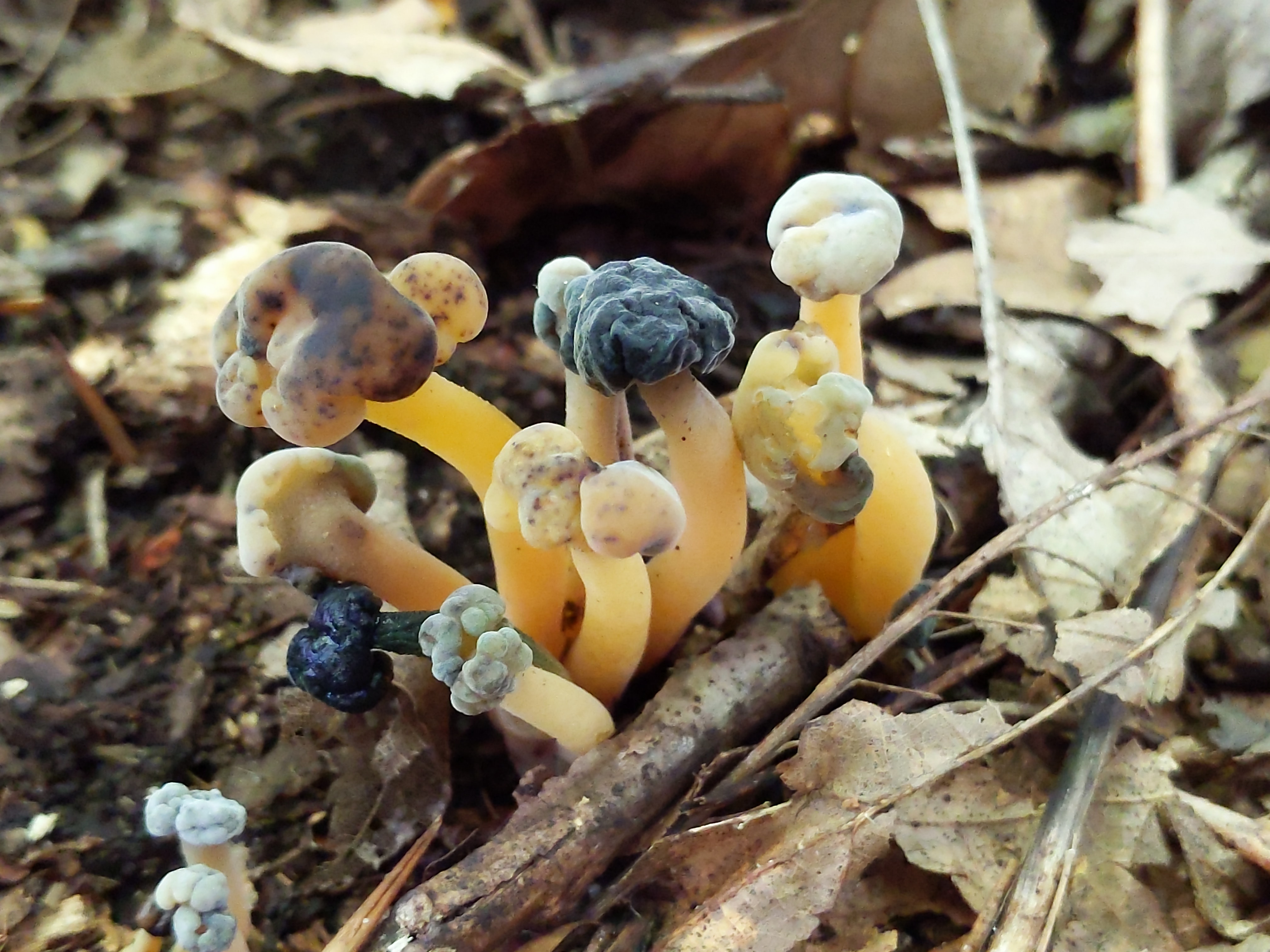
Hypomyces leotiicola infecting Leotia lubrica (Michigan, United States)

While it has been conventionally regarded as a saprotroph, molecular, isotopic and other lines of evidence have suggested that L. lubrica forms ectomycorrhizae.

Fruit bodies can be infected by the mould Hypomyces leotiarum (asexual reproduction form of Hypomyces leotiicola).

== Toxicity ==
Its fruit bodies are of little culinary interest, and, contrary to what is suggested by the common name, are often described as inedible by field guides. It has also been reported that the species is in fact edible yet insipid. Charles McIlvaine even considered it good, although others describe it as bland. L. lubrica fruit bodies have been found to contain low levels of monomethylhydrazine, a toxic chemical associated with the poisonous false morel Gyromitra esculenta.
