= Jelly Baby =

Jelly baby, Jellie babies or other variants of the same name may refer to

- Jelly Babies - a type of gelatine based sweets (candies) popular since the 19th century in Britain
- Screaming jelly babies - a popular chemistry experiment demonstrating oxidation reactions.
- Jelly baby - Leotia lubrica a type of small woodland fungus which has some resemblance to the gelatinous British sweet (see above)
- Chicken lips - Leotia viscosa a species of mushroom also known by the common name of jelly baby
