= Cudonia lutea =

Scientific classification
- Kingdom: Fungi
- Division: Ascomycota
- Class: Leotiomycetes
- Order: Rhytismatales
- Family: Cudoniaceae
- Genus: Cudonia
- Species: C. lutea

Binomial name
- Cudonia lutea (Peck) Sacc.

Species of fungi

Cudonia lutea is an ascomycete fungus in the family Cudoniaceae. Cudonia species are similar to some Helvella or Leotia species in stature, a stipe with a jelly-like head on top. Cudonia have long spores (requires microscopy), which help separate from Helvella ellipsoid spores. Cudonia lutea can be separated from Leotia by having much longer spores (over 50μm), and the less gelatinous texture. Within the genus, Cudonia circinans is almost identical but is less yellow, grows under conifers, and has spores under 40μm long.
