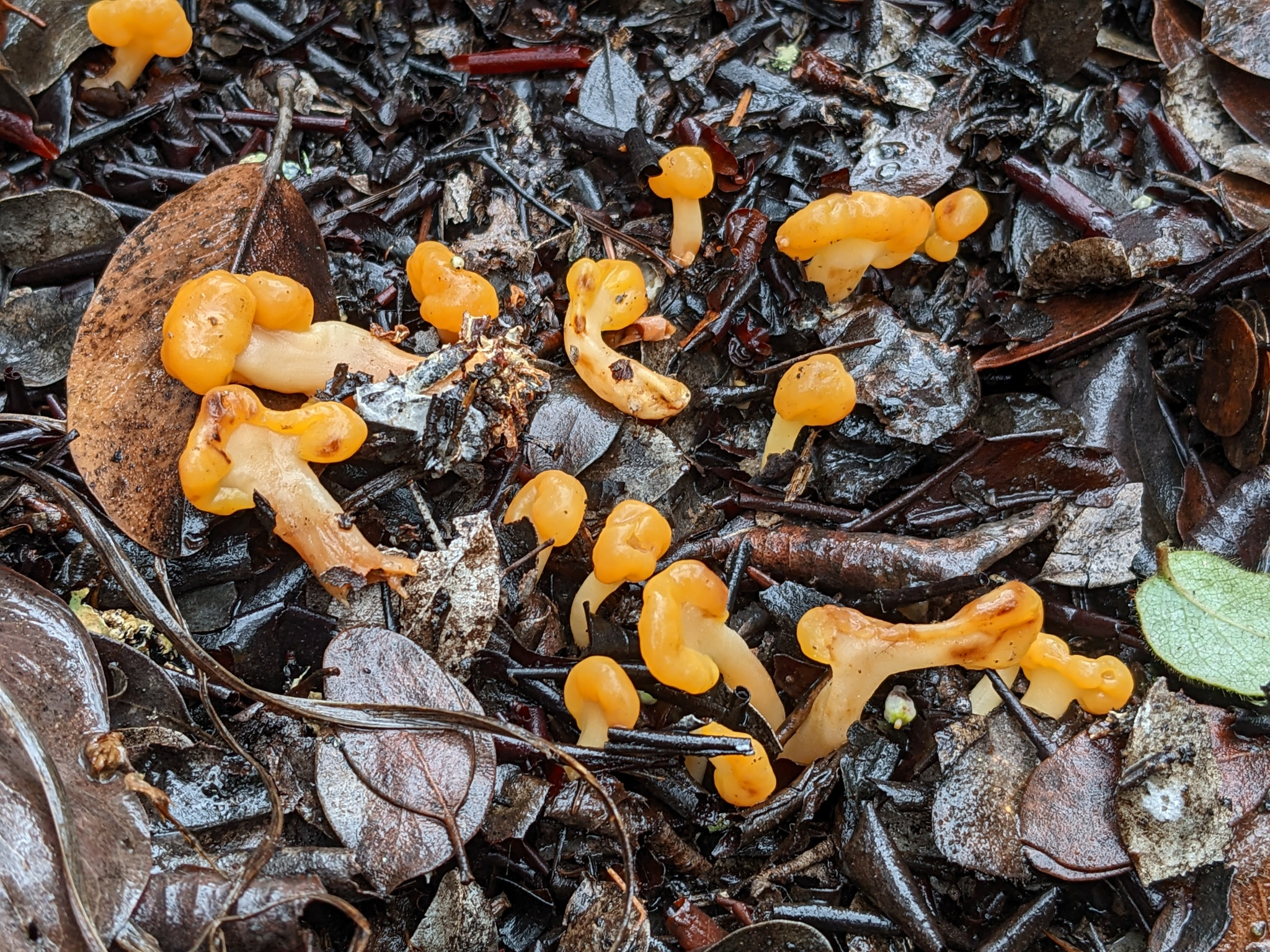
- Sonoma County, California, 2023

Scientific classification
- Kingdom: Fungi
- Division: Ascomycota
- Class: Leotiomycetes
- Order: Rhytismatales
- Family: Cudoniaceae
- Genus: Pachycudonia
- Species: P. spathulata

Binomial name
- Pachycudonia spathulata (S.Imai) S.Imai (1950)

Synonyms
- Cudonia spathulata S.Imai (1942); Spathularia spathulata (S.Imai) Mains (1956)

= Pachycudonia spathulata =

Species of fungus

Pachycudonia spathulata, commonly known as Manzanita butter clumps, is a rare and little-known fungus that grows in association with manzanita and Pacific madrone trees on the west coast of North America. This fungus was first described in 1942 by Sanshi Imai as Cudonia spathulata and renamed by Imai in 1950 to Pachycudonia spathulata. (Note: Pachycudonia was proposed as a section of the genus Cudonia in 1936.)

Mycologists are investigating the range of this fungus and seeking new observations and specimen collections.
