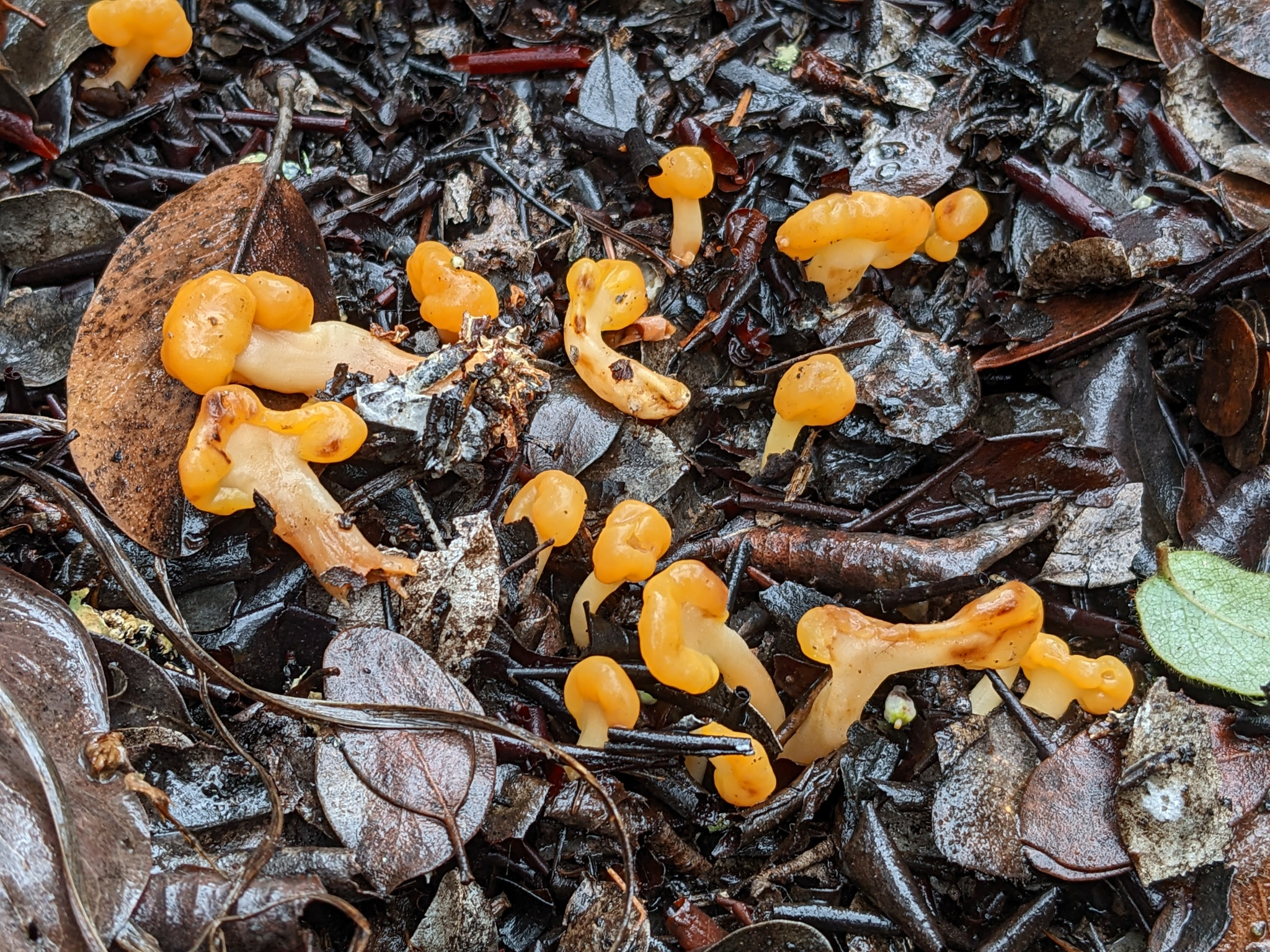

Scientific classification
- Kingdom: Fungi
- Division: Ascomycota
- Class: Leotiomycetes
- Order: Rhytismatales
- Family: Cudoniaceae
- Genus: Pachycudonia; S.Imai (1950)

Type species
- Pachycudonia constrictospora (S.Ito & S.Imai) S.Imai (1950)

= Pachycudonia =

Genus of fungi

Pachycudonia is a genus of mushroom-forming fungi in the family Cudoniaceae. The Japanese mycologist Sanshi Imai originally proposed it as a section of the genus Cudonia, basing it on the species Cudonia constrictospora, and describing the main characteristic of the genus as Pileus convexo-hemiglobosus vel depresso-convexus, crassus ("Pileus convex to hemispherical or depressed-convex, thick.") He later promoted it to distinct genus status in 1950. Pachycudonia has three species:

- Pachycudonia constrictospora (S.Ito & S.Imai) S.Imai (1950)
- Pachycudonia monticola (Mains) S.Imai (1950)
- Pachycudonia spathulata (S.Imai) S.Imai (1950)

The distribution of the genus, when described by Imai in 1955, was restricted to Japan and the Pacific coast of North America.
