= Cairney =

Cairney is a surname. Notable people with the surname include:

- Gemma Cairney (born 1985), English radio and television presenter
- Harry Cairney (born 1961), Scottish footballer
- Jim Cairney (1931–2018), Scottish footballer
- Joe Cairney (1956–2009), Scottish footballer
- John Cairney (1930–2023), Scottish actor
- John Cairney (anatomist) (1898–1966), New Zealand doctor and writer
- John Cairney (mycologist) (1959–2012), Scottish-Australian mycologist
- Paul Cairney (born 1987), Scottish footballer
- Tom Cairney (born 1991), Scottish footballer

== See also ==
- Cairnie, a village in Aberdeenshire, Scotland
