= Geocoryne =

Scientific classification
- Kingdom: Fungi
- Division: Ascomycota
- Class: Leotiomycetes
- Order: Leotiales
- Family: Leotiaceae
- Genus: Geocoryne; Korf

Type species
- Geocoryne variispora Korf

Genus of fungi

Geocoryne is a genus of fungi within the Leotiaceae family.
