= Gelatinipulvinella =

Scientific classification
- Kingdom: Fungi
- Division: Ascomycota
- Class: Leotiomycetes
- Order: Leotiales
- Family: Leotiaceae
- Genus: Gelatinipulvinella; Hosoya & Y. Otani

Type species
- Gelatinipulvinella astraeicola Hosoya & Y. Otani

Genus of fungi

Gelatinipulvinella is a genus of fungi within the Leotiaceae family. This is a monotypic genus, containing the single species Gelatinipulvinella astraeicola.
