= Leotia atrovirens =

Scientific classification
- Kingdom: Fungi
- Division: Ascomycota
- Class: Leotiomycetes
- Order: Leotiales
- Family: Leotiaceae
- Genus: Leotia
- Species: L. atrovirens

Binomial name
- Leotia atrovirens Pers.

Species of fungus

Leotia atrovirens
- Mycological characteristics
- Smooth hymenium
- Cap is convex
- Hymenium attachment is not applicable
- Stipe is bare
- Spore print is white
- Ecology is saprotrophic
- Edibility is unknown

Leotia atrovirens is a species of mushroom. The edibility of this mushroom is unknown. The cap is green, but as it matures it becomes dark green. The cap is lumpy, when young it is slimy or sticky. The stem can range from light green to dark green. The spore print is white. It has no gills. The fruiting body is gelatinous. It usually grows near each other in large to small clusters under conifers trees. They also grow well in dead stumps and moist soil.
