= Ericoid mycorrhiza =

Symbiosis between a plant and a fungus

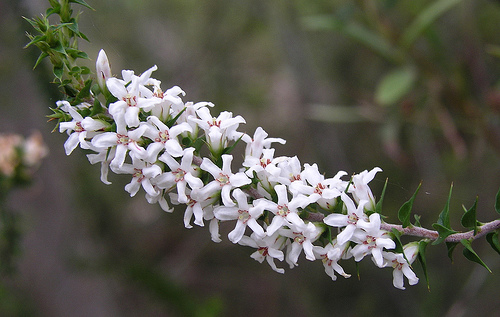
Epacris pulchella, an ericoid mycorrhizal epacrid from eastern Australia.

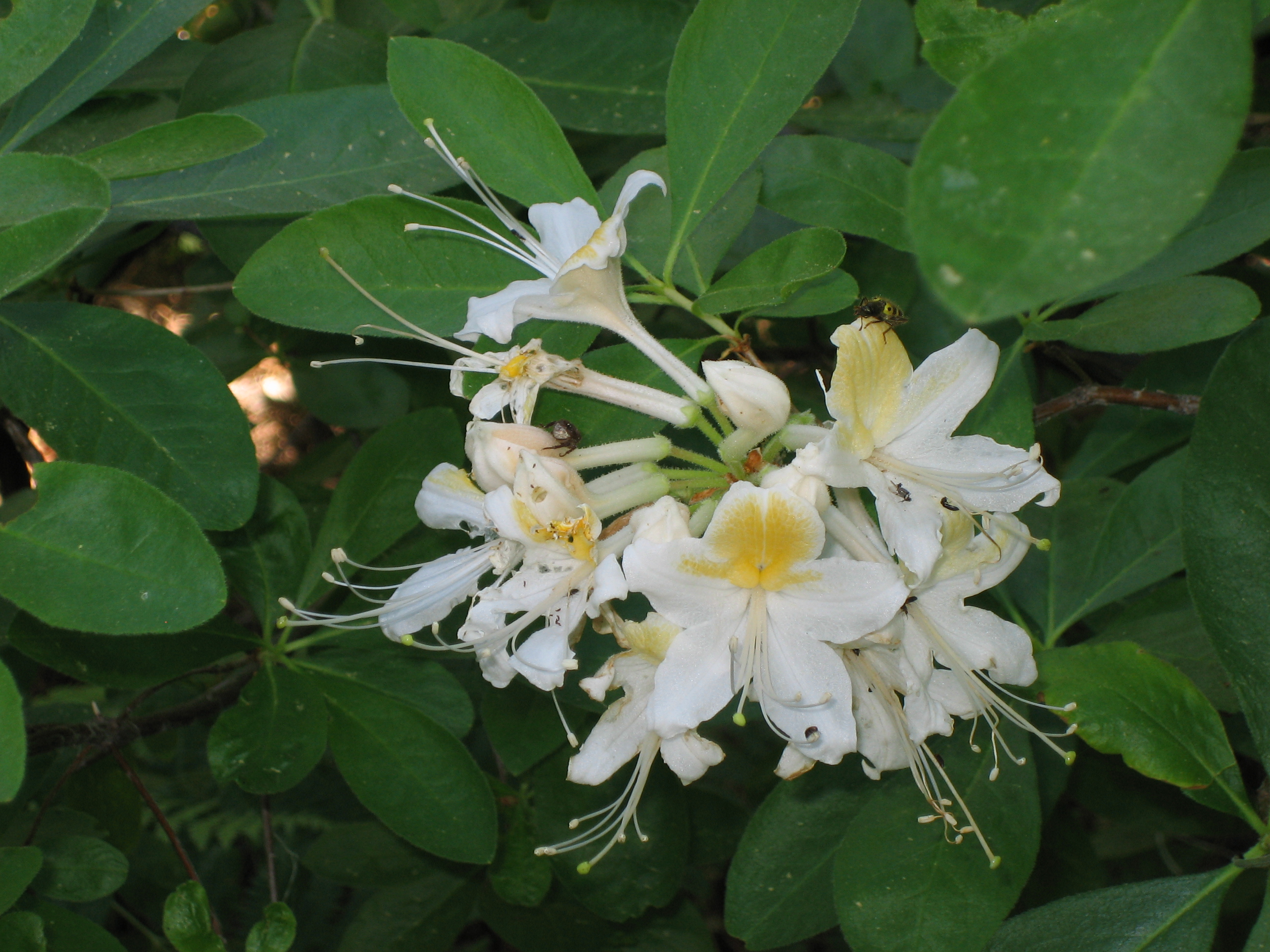
Western Azalea, Rhododendron occidentale, a western North American ericoid mycorrhizal species.

The ericoid mycorrhiza is a mutualistic relationship formed between members of the plant family Ericaceae and several lineages of mycorrhizal fungi. This symbiosis represents an important adaptation to acidic and nutrient poor soils that species in the Ericaceae typically inhabit, including boreal forests, bogs, and heathlands. Molecular clock estimates suggest that the symbiosis originated approximately 140 million years ago.

== Structure and function ==
Ericoid mycorrhizas are characterized by fungal coils that form in the epidermal cells of the fine hair roots of ericaceous species. Ericoid mycorrhizal fungi establish loose hyphal networks around the outside of hair roots, from which they penetrate the walls of cortical cells to form intracellular coils that can densely pack individual plant cells. However, the fungi do not penetrate plasma membranes of plant cells. Evidence suggests that coils only function for a period of a few weeks before the plant cell and fungal hyphae begin to degrade.

The coil is the site where fungi exchange nutrients obtained from the soil for carbohydrates fixed through photosynthesis by the plant. Ericoid mycorrhizal fungi have been shown to have enzymatic capabilities to break down complex organic molecules. This may allow some ericoid mycorrhizal fungi to act as saprotrophs. However, the primary function of these enzymatic capabilities is likely to access organic forms of nutrients, such as nitrogen, whose mineralized forms are in very limiting quantities in habitats typically occupied by ericaceous plants.

== Fungal symbionts ==
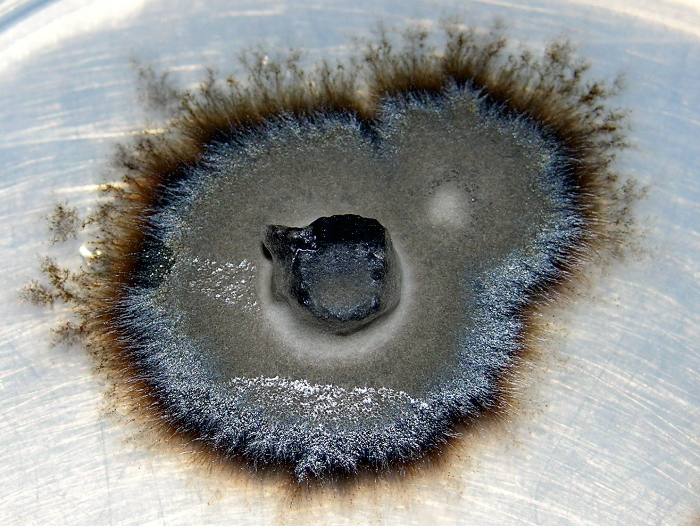
An isolate of the ericoid mycorrhizal fungus, Gamarada debralockiae, isolated from Woollsia pungens

The majority of research with ericoid mycorrhizal fungal physiology and function has focused on fungal isolates morphologically identified as Rhizoscyphus ericae, in the Ascomycota order Helotiales, now known to be a Pezoloma species.

In addition to Rhizoscyphus ericae, it is currently recognized that culturable Ascomycota such as Meliniomyces (closely allied with Rhizoscyphus ericae), Cairneyella variabilis, Gamarada debralockiae and Oidiodendron maius form ericoid mycorrhizas. The application of DNA sequencing to fungal isolates and clones from environmental PCR has uncovered diverse fungal communities in ericoid roots, however, the ability of these fungi to form typical ericoid mycorrhizal coils has not been verified and some may be non-mycorrhizal endophytes, saprobes or parasites.

In addition to ascomycetes, Sebacina species in the phylum Basidiomycota are also recognized as frequent, but unculturable, associates of ericoid roots, and can form ericoid mycorrhizas. Similarly, basidiomycetes from the order Hymenochaetales have also been implicated in ericoid mycorrhizal formation.

== Geographic and host distribution ==
The ericoid mycorrhizal symbiosis is widespread. Ericaceae species occupy at least some habitats on all continents except Antarctica. A few lineages within the Ericaceae do not form ericoid mycorrhizas, and instead form other types of mycorrhizas, including manzanita (Arctostaphylos), madrone (Arbutus), and the Monotropoidiae. The geographic distribution of many of the fungi is uncertain, primarily because the identification of the fungal partners has not always been easy, especially prior to the application of DNA-based identification methods. Fungi ascribed to Rhizoscyphus ericae have been identified from Northern and Southern Hemisphere habitats, but these are not likely all the same species. Some studies have also shown that fungal communities colonizing ericoid roots can lack specificity for different species of ericoid plant, suggesting that at least some of these fungi have a broad host range.

== Economic significance ==
Ericoid mycorrhizal fungi form symbioses with several crop and ornamental species, such as blueberries, cranberries and Rhododendron. Inoculation with ericoid mycorrhizal fungi can influence plant growth and nutrient uptake. However, much less agricultural and horticultural research has been conducted with ericoid mycorrhizal fungi relative to arbuscular mycorrhizal and ectomycorrhizal fungi.

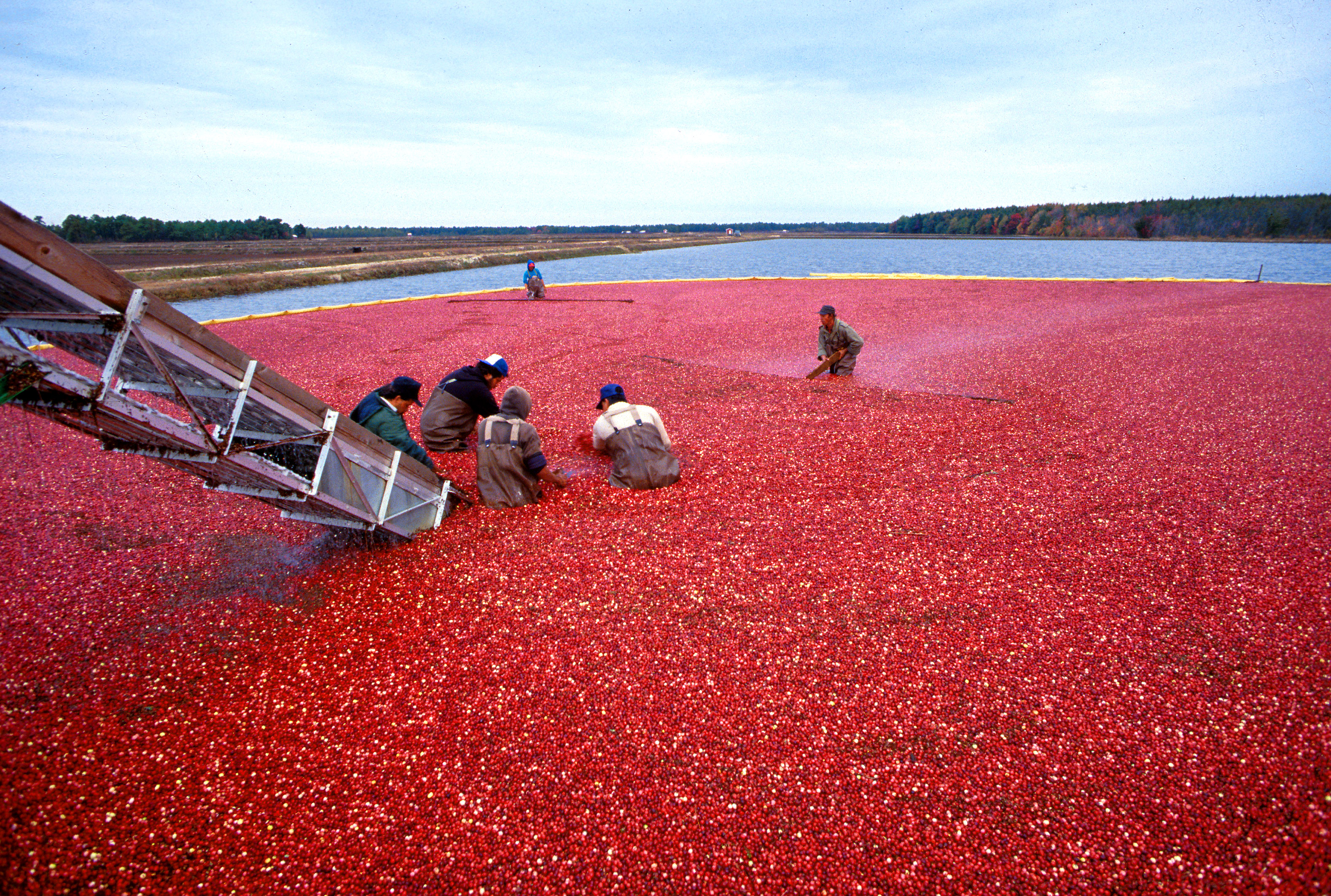
Cranberries, an ericoid mycorrhizal crop

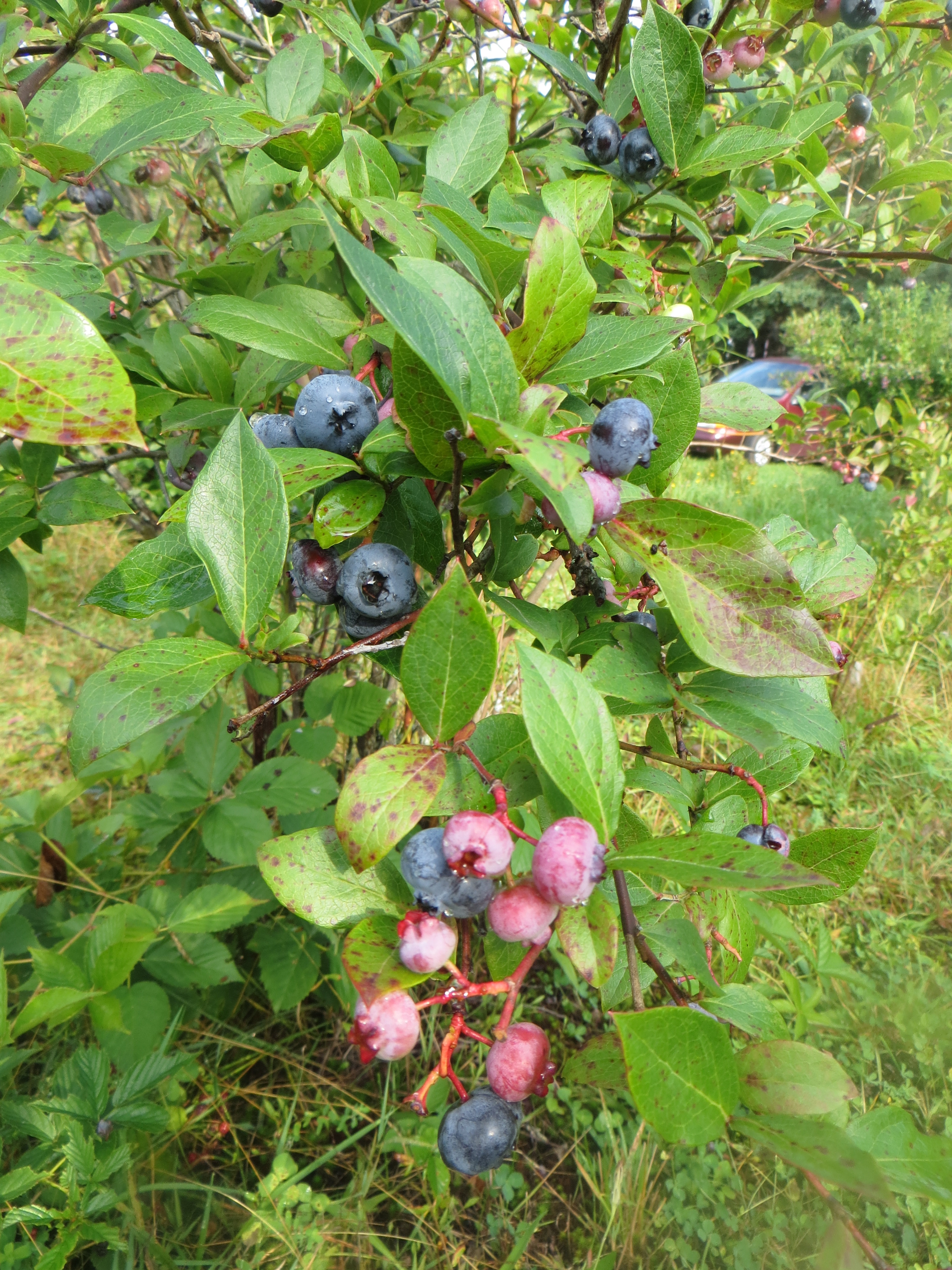
Northern highbush blueberries, Vaccinium corymbosum, an ericoid mycorrhizal crop
