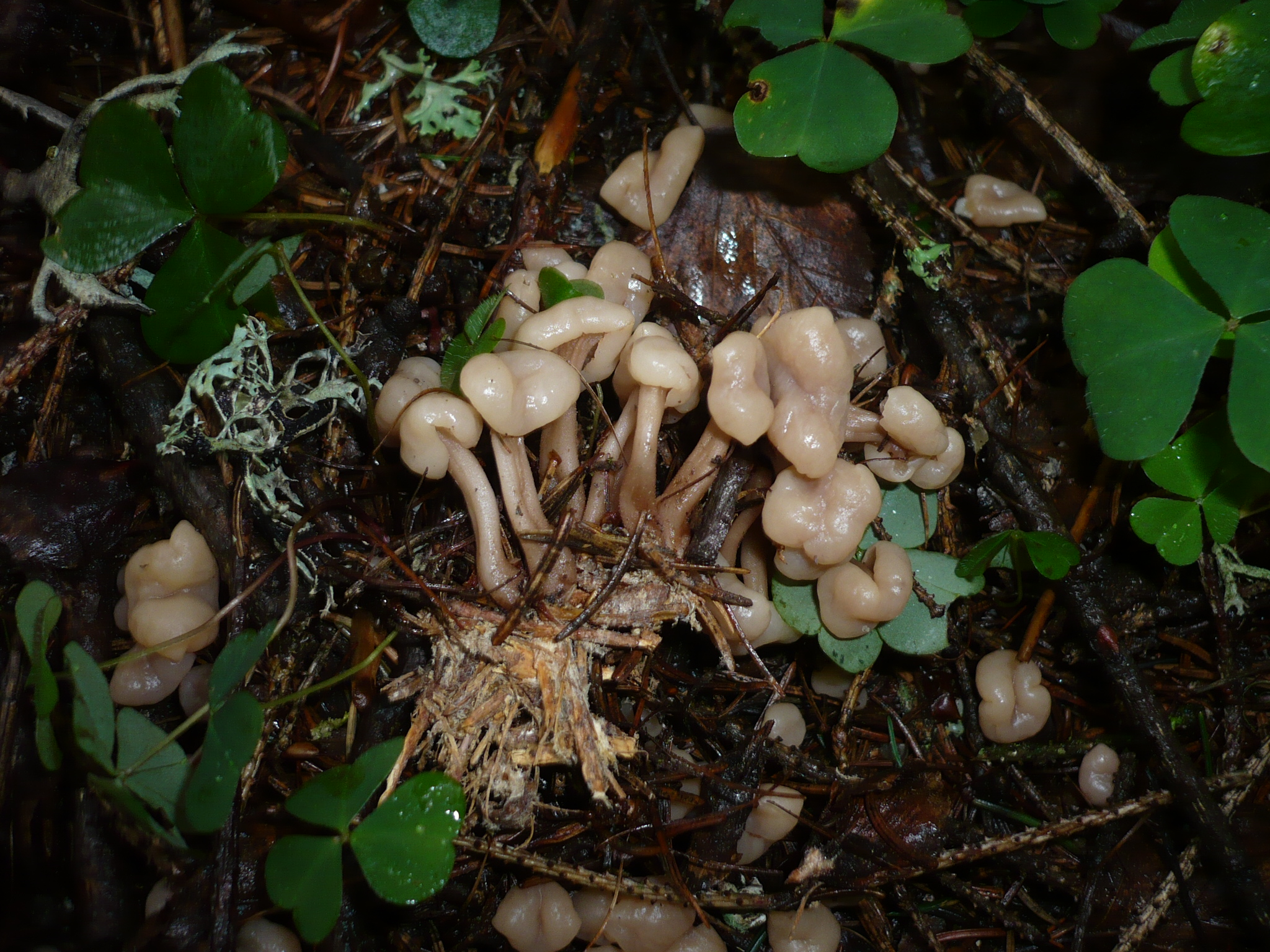

Scientific classification
- Domain: Eukaryota
- Kingdom: Fungi
- Division: Ascomycota
- Class: Leotiomycetes
- Order: Rhytismatales
- Family: Cudoniaceae
- Genus: Cudonia
- Species: C. confusa

Binomial name
- Cudonia confusa Bres. (1898)

= Cudonia confusa =

Species of fungus

Cudonia confusa, commonly known as the cinnamon jellybaby, is a species of fungus in the family Cudoniaceae. The species was first described scientifically in 1898 by Italian mycologist Giacomo Bresadola.

== Description ==
The fungus forms slimy or sticky club-shaped fruit bodies up to 3 cm (1 1/8 in) high with a cinnamon to reddish-brown "head" that measures 7–12 mm (1/4–1/2 in) atop a similarly coloured stalk that is 2–3 cm (3/4–1 1/8 in) by 1–2 mm thick. Its cylindrical spores measure 35–45 by 2 μm; arranged in a parallel fashion, they are borne in asci that measure 105–120 by 10–12 μm. The paraphyses are curled at their tips.

Cudonia circinans is similar in appearance, but its stalk is not the same color as its head.

== Habitat and distribution ==
Cudonia confusa is found in Asia (China and Korea) and Europe, where it usually grows in tufts in coniferous forests.
