= Leotia =

- Leotia lubrica

Scientific classification
- Kingdom: Fungi
- Division: Ascomycota
- Class: Leotiomycetes
- Order: Leotiales
- Family: Leotiaceae
- Genus: Leotia; Pers. (1794)

Type species
- Leotia lubrica (Scop.) Pers. (1797)

Species
- Leotia atrovirens Leotia lubrica Leotia viscosa

Genus of fungi

Leotia is a genus of cup fungi of the division Ascomycota. Leotia species are globally distributed, and are believed to be ectomycorrhizal. They are commonly known as jelly babies because of the gelatinous texture of their fruiting bodies.

== Biology ==
Leotia species are characterized by their capitate ascocarps. Within the class Leotiomycetes, Leotia species produce large fruiting bodies; their long-stalked apothecia bear a fertile layer of asci that covers the upper surface of a mushroom-like cap.

Leotia is closely related to Microglossum, another genus characterized by capitate ascocarps. The species of Leotia have traditionally been defined largely by the fresh color of the ascocarps (tan in L. lubrica, olive-green in L. atrovirens, and green-headed with a yellow stalk in L. viscosa). However, a molecular phylogenetic study revealed that color is a poor predictor of species affiliation, suggesting further study is needed to develop new, more predictive species concepts.

== Gallery ==
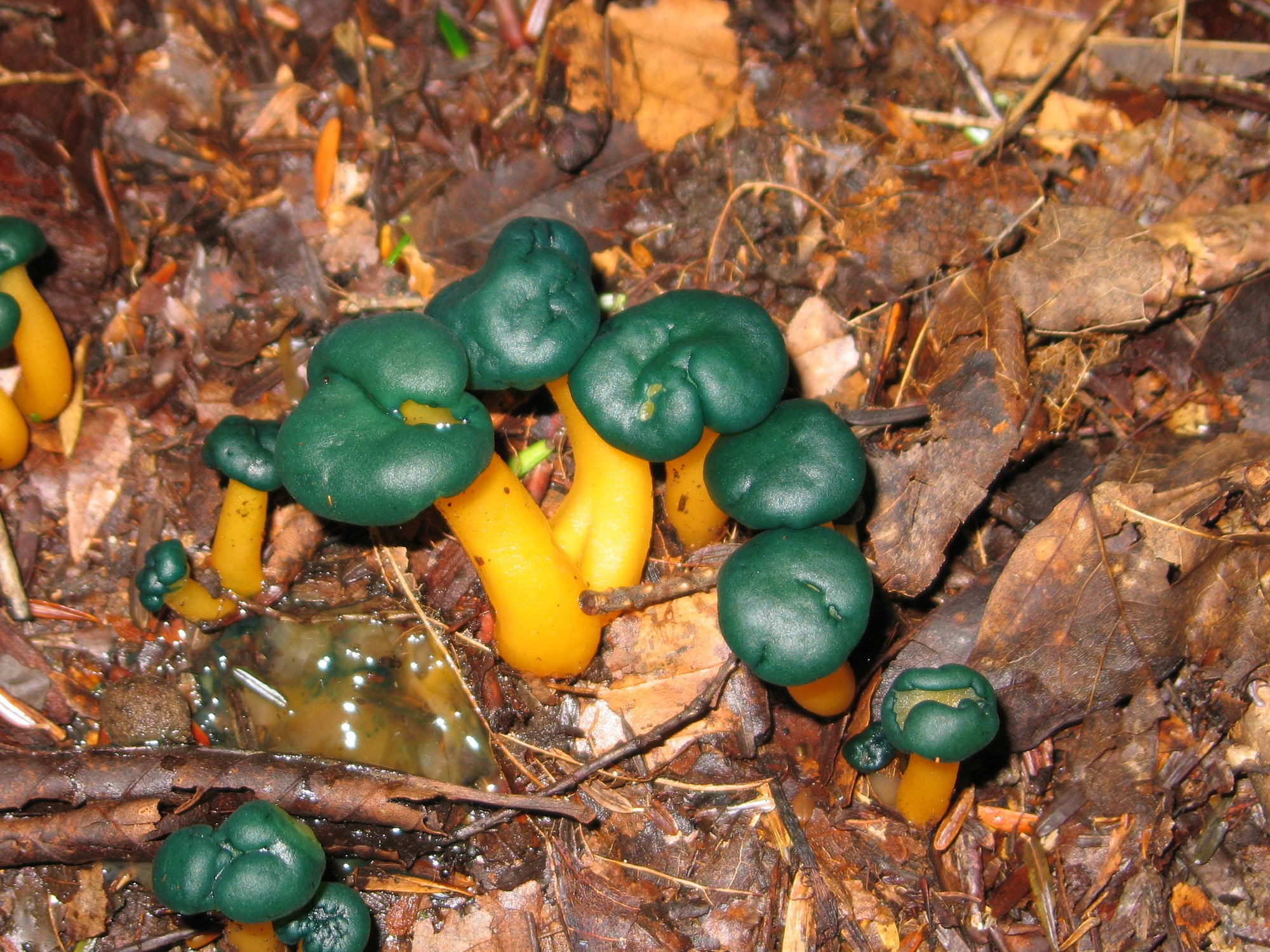
Leotia viscosa
