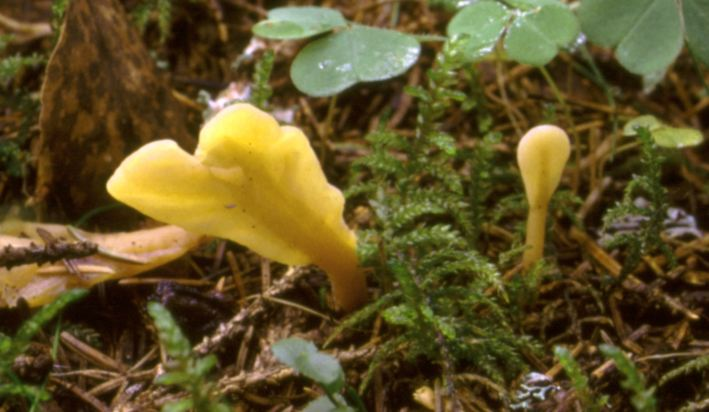

Conservation status
- Apparently Secure (NatureServe)

Scientific classification
- Kingdom: Fungi
- Division: Ascomycota
- Class: Leotiomycetes
- Order: Rhytismatales
- Family: Cudoniaceae
- Genus: Spathularia
- Species: S. flavida

Binomial name
- Spathularia flavida Pers. (1797)

Synonyms
- Helvella clavata Schaeff. (1774); Boletus elvela Batsch (1783); Spathularia flava Pers. (1797); Spathularia clavata (Schaeff.) Sacc. (1889); Mitruliopsis flavida Peck (1903)

= Spathularia flavida =

Species of fungus

Spathularia flavida
- Mycological characteristics
- Smooth hymenium
- Hymenium attachment is not applicable
- Stipe is bare
- Spore print is buff
- Ecology is saprotrophic
- Edibility is edible or unknown

Spathularia flavida, commonly known as the yellow earth tongue, the yellow fan, or the fairy fan, is an ascomycete fungus. It produces a small, fan- or spoon-shaped fruit body with a flat, wavy or lobed cream to yellow colored "head" raised on a white to cream stalk. It is usually 2–5 cm (3/4–2 in) tall. The spores produced by the fungus are needle-like, and up to 95 μm long. Several varieties have been described that differ largely in their microscopic characteristics.

The fungus fruits on the ground in mosses, forest duff or humus, and fruit bodies may occur singly, in large groups, or in fairy rings. It is found in coniferous forests of Asia, Europe and North America. It has been described by authorities variously as inedible, of unknown edibility, or edible but tough.

== Taxonomy ==
The species was first described in 1774 by the German botanist Jacob Christian Schäffer. Schaeffer gave it the binomial Elvella clavata, and called it Der keulenförmige Faltenschwamm ("the club-shaped wrinkled sponge") in the vernacular. In 1794, Christian Hendrik Persoon published Spathularia flavida as a nomen novum (new replacement name), as Schaeffer's published name was not legitimate. Elias Fries sanctioned this name in the first edition of his Systema Mycologicum (1821). According to the taxonomical database MycoBank, additional synonyms include Boletus elvela as defined by August Johann Georg Karl Batsch in 1783, and Spathularia clavata published by Pier Andrea Saccardo in 1889. In a 1955 publication, American mycologist Edwin Butterworth Mains considered Charles Horton Peck's 1903 Mitruliopsis flavida to be the same species as S. flavida.

The mushroom is commonly known as the "yellow earth tongue", "yellow fan", of "fairy fan". Samuel Gray called it the "yellowish spatula-stool" in his 1821 Natural Arrangement of British plants. The specific epithet flavida is Latin for "blonde" or "golden yellow".

== Description ==
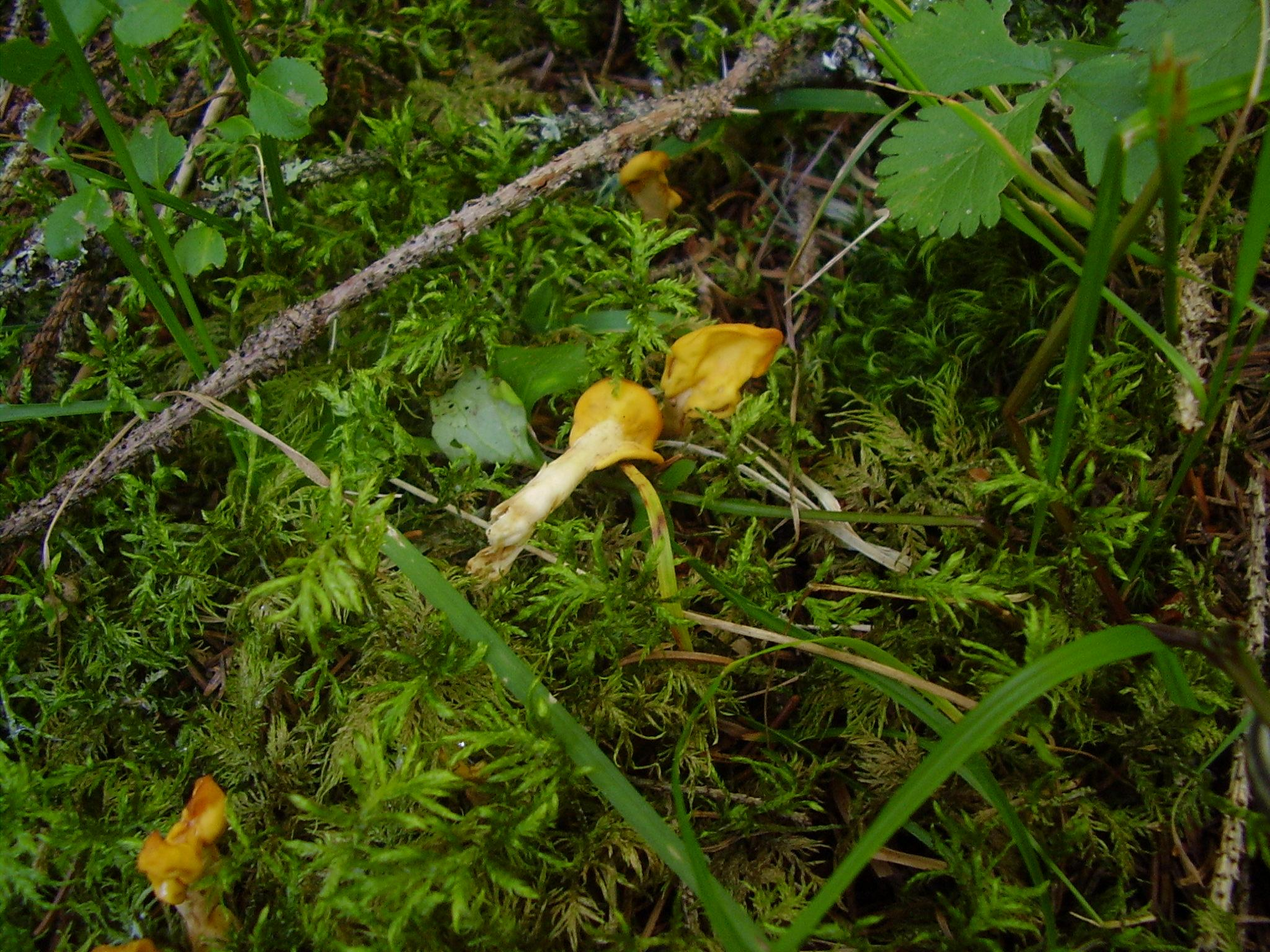
Fruit bodies growing in moss. Found in coniferous forest, Dospat region, Bulgaria

The fan- or spoon-shaped fruit bodies of S. flavida may be up to 8 cm (3 1/8 in) high, although a range between 2–5 cm (3/4–2 in) is more typical. Occasionally, fruit bodies are produced with the "head" split into two separate lobes. The color is light to strong yellow, the flattened fertile area at times paler; the color tends to deepen with the age of the fruit body. The fertile area (the region that produces spores) is often irregularly wrinkled and sometimes notched at apex, and is up to 2 cm (3/4 in) wide; it tapers down the length of either side of the stem (i.e., decurrently) from a half to a third of the total stem length. The division between the head and the stem is sharply defined. The stem is hollow, smooth (glabrous), and has a white to yellowish mycelium at its base. The flesh of the fruit body is whitish, but becomes yellowish-brown when dry.

=== Microscopic characteristics ===
In mass, the spores appear yellowish-brown, especially when they are dry. Viewed under the microscope, they appear hyaline (translucent). The spores are variable in size, but typically in the range of 30–95 by 1.5–2.5 μm. They may be non-or several septate, slender and pointed (acicular), and have an outer wall with a gelatinous layer. The asci (the spore-bearing structures) are club-shaped, with dimensions of 85–125 by 8–12 μm. The asci do not have a covering lid known as an operculum. The paraphyses (sterile cells found in the hymenium) are filamentous, and hyaline (translucent); some are ring-shaped (circinate).

=== Varieties ===
Mains described a number of varieties of S. flavida based largely on differences in the shapes and sizes of their spores. All varieties were described from collections made in the United States.

- S. flavida var. flavida

In the typical variety, spores range in size from 40–62 μm (although a smaller range of 45–56 μm is most typical) by 2–2.5 μm; the paraphyses are either slightly branched above or not at all, and are curved to circinate at their apices.

- S. flavida var. tortuosa

In this variety, the paraphyses are more curved to circinate and twisted at the apices, and often form a dense intertwined layer above the asci.

- S. flavida var. ramosa

The spores are smaller than the typical variety, usually 39–42 by 1.5–2 μm; the paraphyses are irregularly branched on the upper portion. Fruit bodies in this variety are club-shaped and flattened compared to the typical tongue-shape of the typical variety.

- S. flavida var. brevispora

This variety, common in Michigan, has spores that are 32–40 by 2 μm.

- S. flavida var. longispora

Variety longispora is known from the Pacific Northwest. It has spores that are 55–75 by 2–2.5 μm, and paraphyses that are similar to the typical variety.

=== Similar species ===
Lookalike species

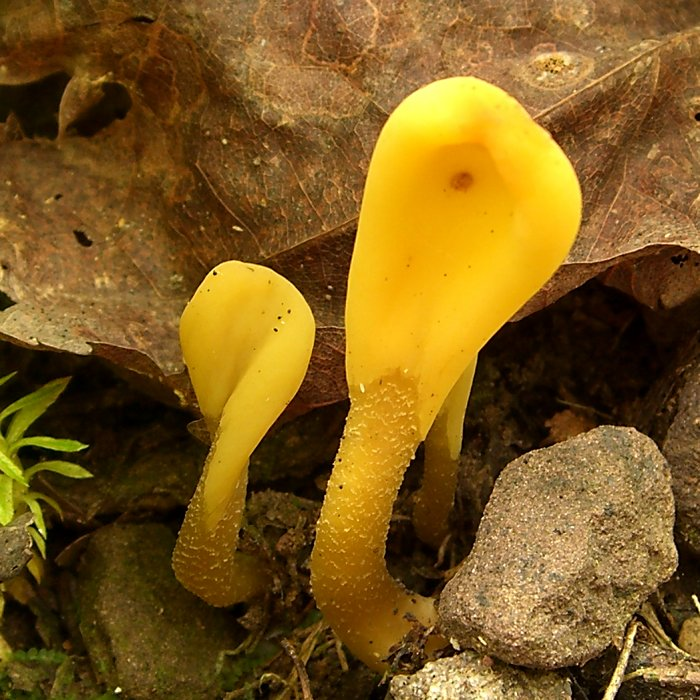
Microglossum rufum

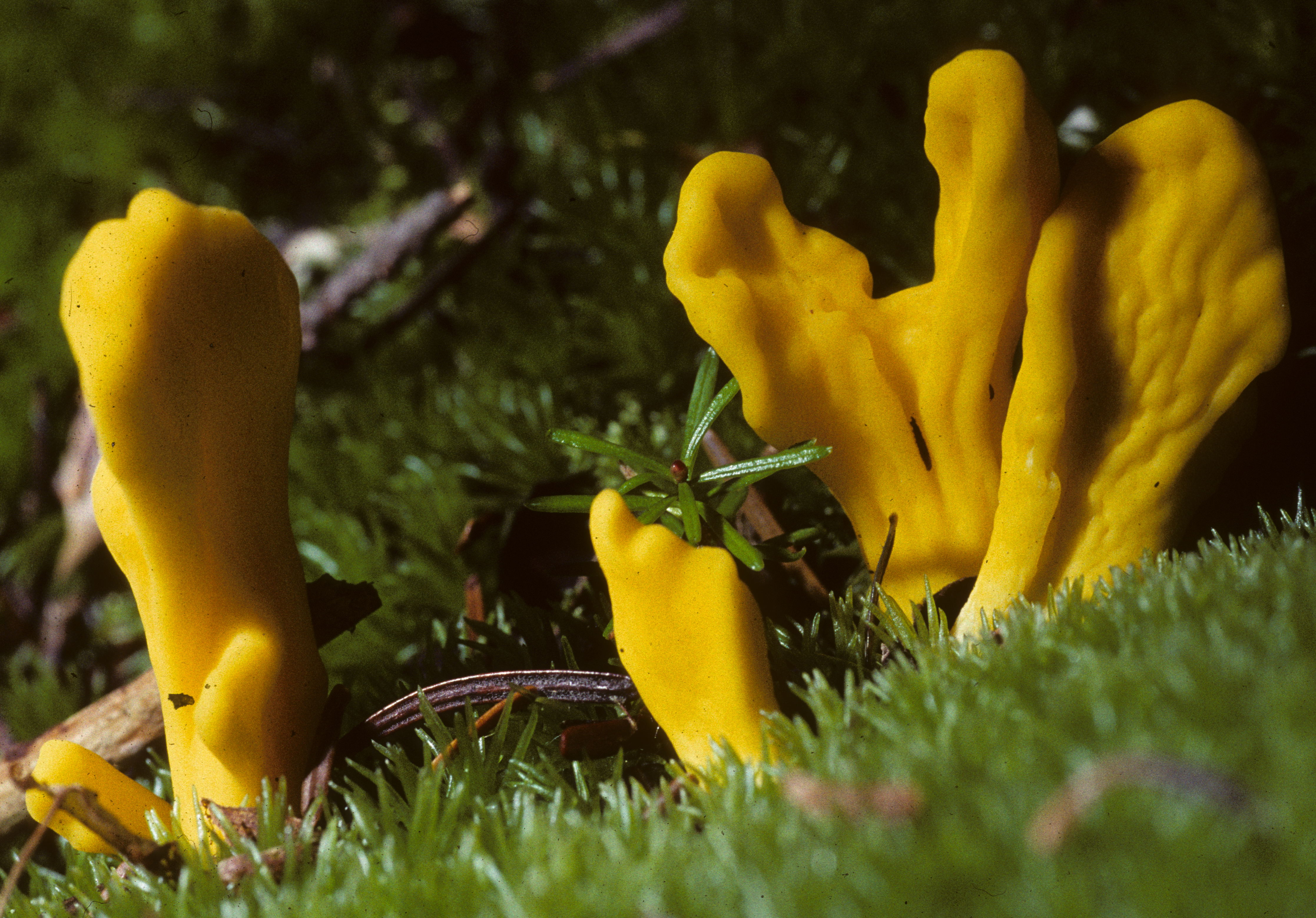
Neolecta irregularis

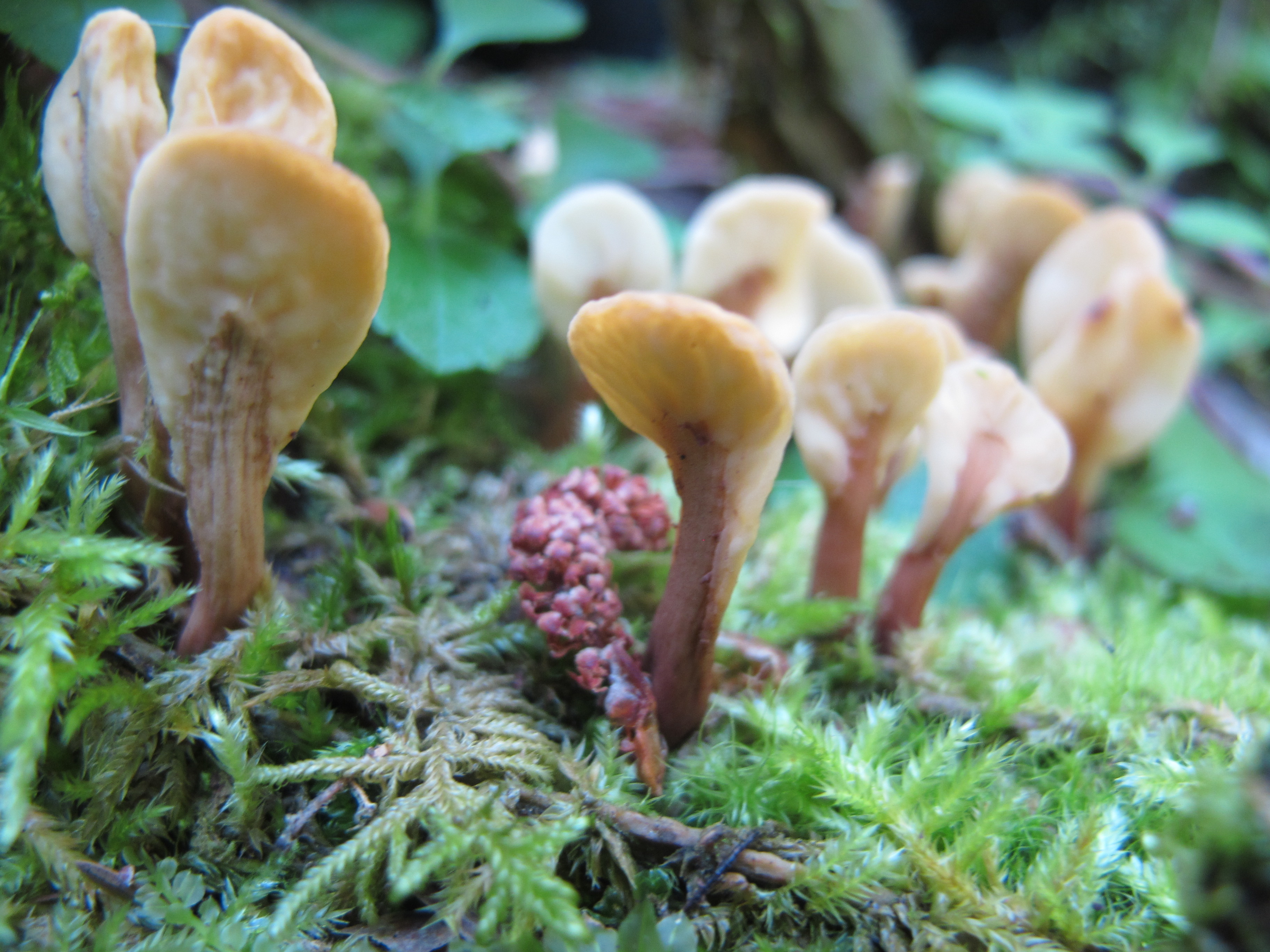
Spathulariopsis velutipes

Spathularia flavida may be distinguished from the velvet-foot fairy fan (Spathulariopsis velutipes) by differences in the stem: S. velutipes is fuzzy and brown rather than smooth and yellowish. The fuzziness is a result of a thin layer of intertwined hyphae that cover the stem, which project short hyphae outward from the surface. The closely related species S. neesi has an ochre color, spores that measure 60–80 by 1.5–2 μm, and paraphyses that are branched on the upper parts. S. rufa is also best distinguished via microscopy.

Neolecta irregularis is roughly similar in appearance to S. flavida, but lacks a sharply differentiated, spoon-shaped head, has a stem lighter in color than the head, and microscopically, has much smaller oval to elliptical spores that measure 5.5–8.5 by 3–4 μm. Another yellowish earth-tongue fungus, Microglossum rufum, has a well-defined oval to spoon-shaped head, and sausage- to spindle-shaped spores that are 18–38 by 4–6 μm.

== Distribution and habitat ==
A cosmopolitan and widespread species, S. flavida is common in temperate regions such as the Pacific Northwest region of North America, extending north to Alaska; it is, however, unknown in Mexico. In Europe, it has been collected from Britain, Germany, Spain, Austria, Belgium, Scandinavia, and Italy; in Asia, it has been reported from India Japan, and Turkey. It is considered a protected species in Slovakia.

The fruit bodies grow scattered or in groups on forest duff or humus under conifers, summer and fall, and may grow in rings or arcs. Thought to be a saprobic species (that is, obtaining nutrients from dead or decomposing organic matter), it has also been found on rotten wood. One field guide says of this species, "that one is apt to see [it] while down on the ground looking for something else."

== Ecology ==
The fungus is able to protect itself from mycophagy by the springtail Ceratophysella denisana, a common mushroom feeder, by releasing repellent odorous compounds when it is injured.

== Edibility ==
The edibility of S. flavida is variously described as untested, unknown, or "edible, but rather tough". The small size would likely discourage table use. The odor and taste are not distinctive.
