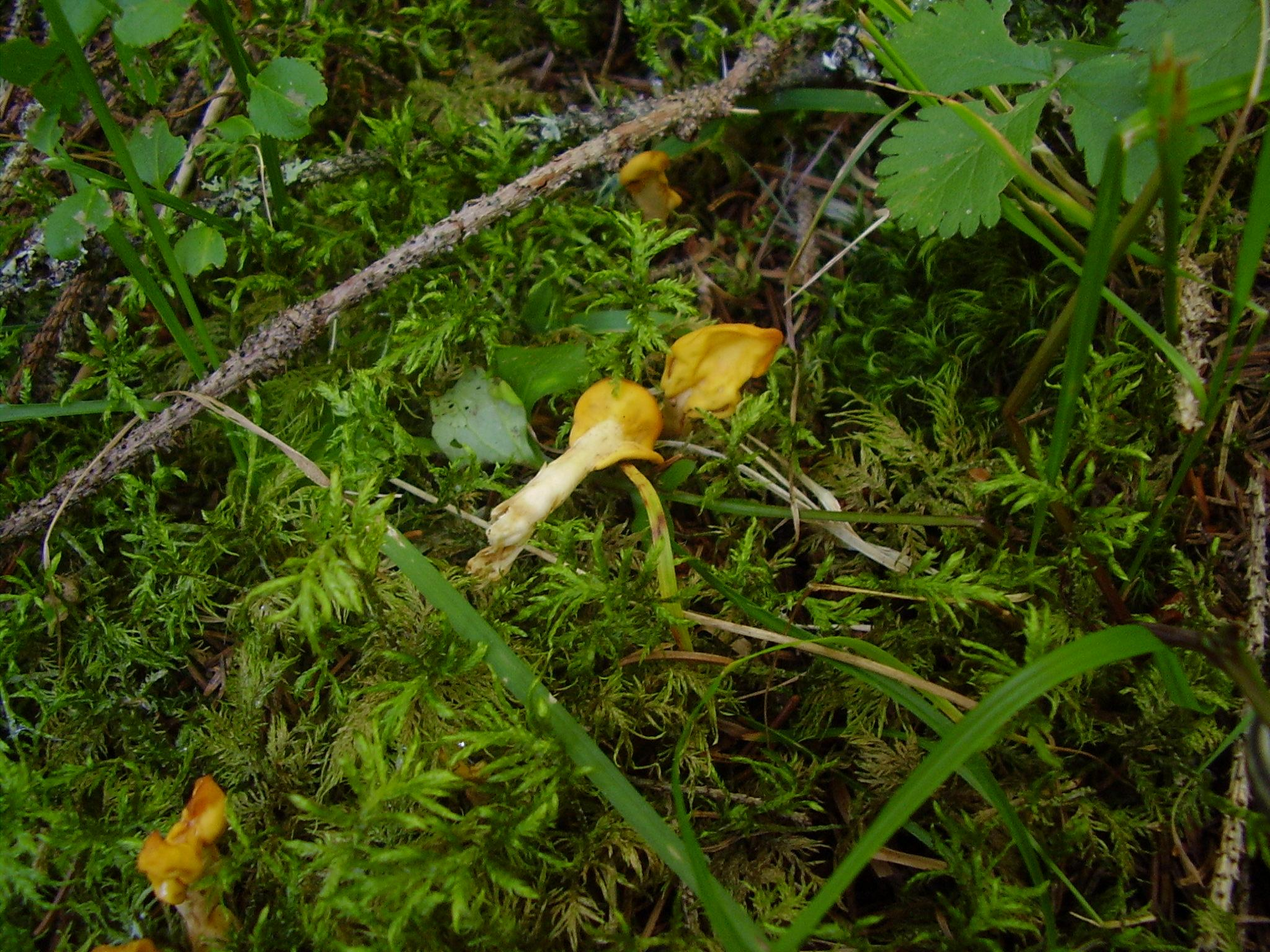
- Spathularia flavida

Scientific classification
- Kingdom: Fungi
- Division: Ascomycota
- Class: Leotiomycetes
- Order: Rhytismatales
- Family: Cudoniaceae
- Genus: Spathularia; Pers. (1794)

Type species
- Spathularia flavida Pers. (1797)

Species
- Spathularia flavida Spathularia neesii Spathularia rufa

Synonyms
- Spathulea Fr. (1825); Mitruliopsis Peck (1903)

= Spathularia =

Genus of fungi

Spathularia is a genus of fungi in the family Cudoniaceae. Species in the genus are found in coniferous forests around the bases of conifers or near rotting logs. The genus name is Latin for 'broad sword'.

== Spathularia flavida ==
Spathularia flavida, like other members of the family Cudoniaceae, is distinguished by having long, needle-like spores. A common name for Spathularia flavida is yellow Earth tongue. The spores are tightly packed side by side in the asci. The fruit body of S. flavida is a light yellowish-brown color and rarely of a brown color. The stipe grows to about eight centimeters in length and one centimeter in girth, and the flattened head grows on the sides of the stipe. It has a fairly smooth head and stipe, and has no odor. Several specimens were recovered in two expeditions to Sichuan Province, China, in 1997 and 1998. The habitat ranges across continents, mainly the coniferous forests of the United States and Europe. It can be found near the bases of coniferous trees in ring shaped clusters; however, sightings are rare and infrequent.

== Spathularia neesii ==
Spathularia neesii is similar to S. flavida' it is roughly the same size and shape, up to 8 centimeters in length and 1 centimeter in stipe width. Their colors are also similar–both are of a pale yellow but S. neesii tends to have a pale brown, tan, color, unlike the yellow of S. flavida. When dried both specimens look identical and is almost impossible to tell a difference with the naked eye. The distinguishing feature of S. neesii is the spores that measure 60 to 80 mic. long, around 20 mic. longer than that of S. flavida.
