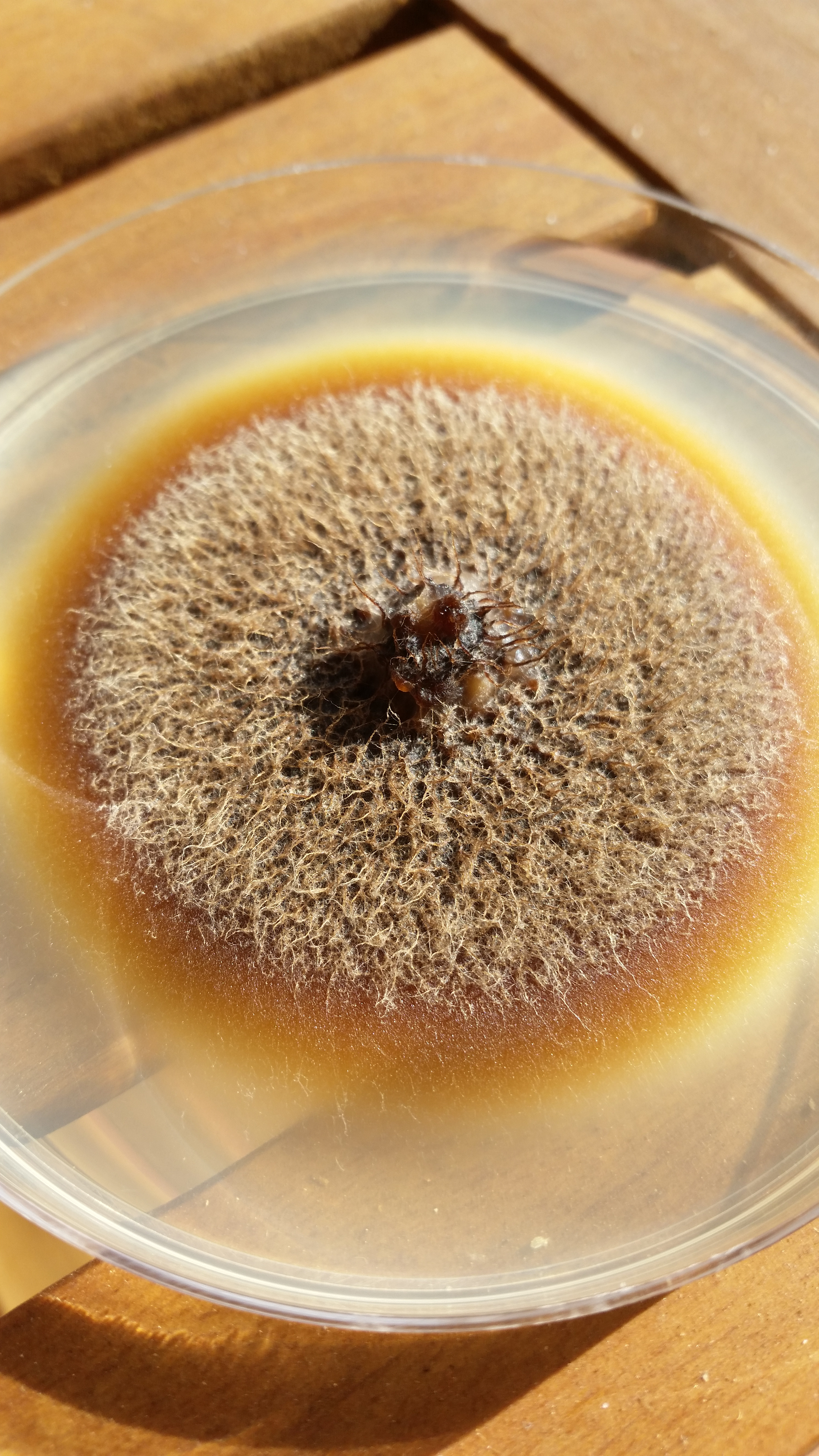
- Cairneyella variabilis

Scientific classification
- Kingdom: Fungi
- Division: Ascomycota
- Class: Leotiomycetes
- Order: Helotiales
- Family: Helotiaceae
- Genus: Cairneyella; Midgley & Tran-Dinh

Type species
- Cairneyella variabilis (Midgley & Tran-Dinh)

= Cairneyella =

Genus of fungi

Cairneyella is a genus of at least two ericoid mycorrhizal and root-associated fungi that is, to date, endemic to Australian plants, mostly from the family Ericaceae. It has been demonstrated to form typical ericoid mycorrhizal coils in hair roots and is known to enhance the growth of ericaceous seedlings. The genus is named in honour of John Cairney, an Australian-Scottish mycologist.

== Species ==
- Cairneyella variabilis
- Cairneyella sp. 2.
