= John Cairney (mycologist) =

Professor John William Gibson Cairney
- Born: 1959; Kilmarnock
- Died: 2012 (aged 52–53); Sydney
- Scientific career
- Fields: Mycorrhizal biology, mycology, microbial ecology

John William Gibson Cairney (1959–2012) was an eminent Scottish–Australian mycologist and Director of the UWS Centre for Plants and the Environment. Cairney specialised in mycorrhizal biology and ecology, particularly of ericoid- and Ectomycorrhiza. Cairney contributed significantly to mycorrhizal research, publishing over 150 manuscripts and serving as the associate editor, editor or on the advisoral panel for numerous scientific journals including: New Phytologist, Plant and Soil, Mycological Research and the Journal of Soils and Sediments.

The Australian ericoid mycorrhizal fungal genus Cairneyella is named in his honour.
