= Pezoloma =

Scientific classification
- Kingdom: Fungi
- Division: Ascomycota
- Class: Leotiomycetes
- Order: Leotiales
- Family: Leotiaceae
- Genus: Pezoloma; Clem.

Type species
- Pezoloma griseum Clem.

Genus of fungi

Pezoloma is a genus of fungi within the Leotiaceae family.
