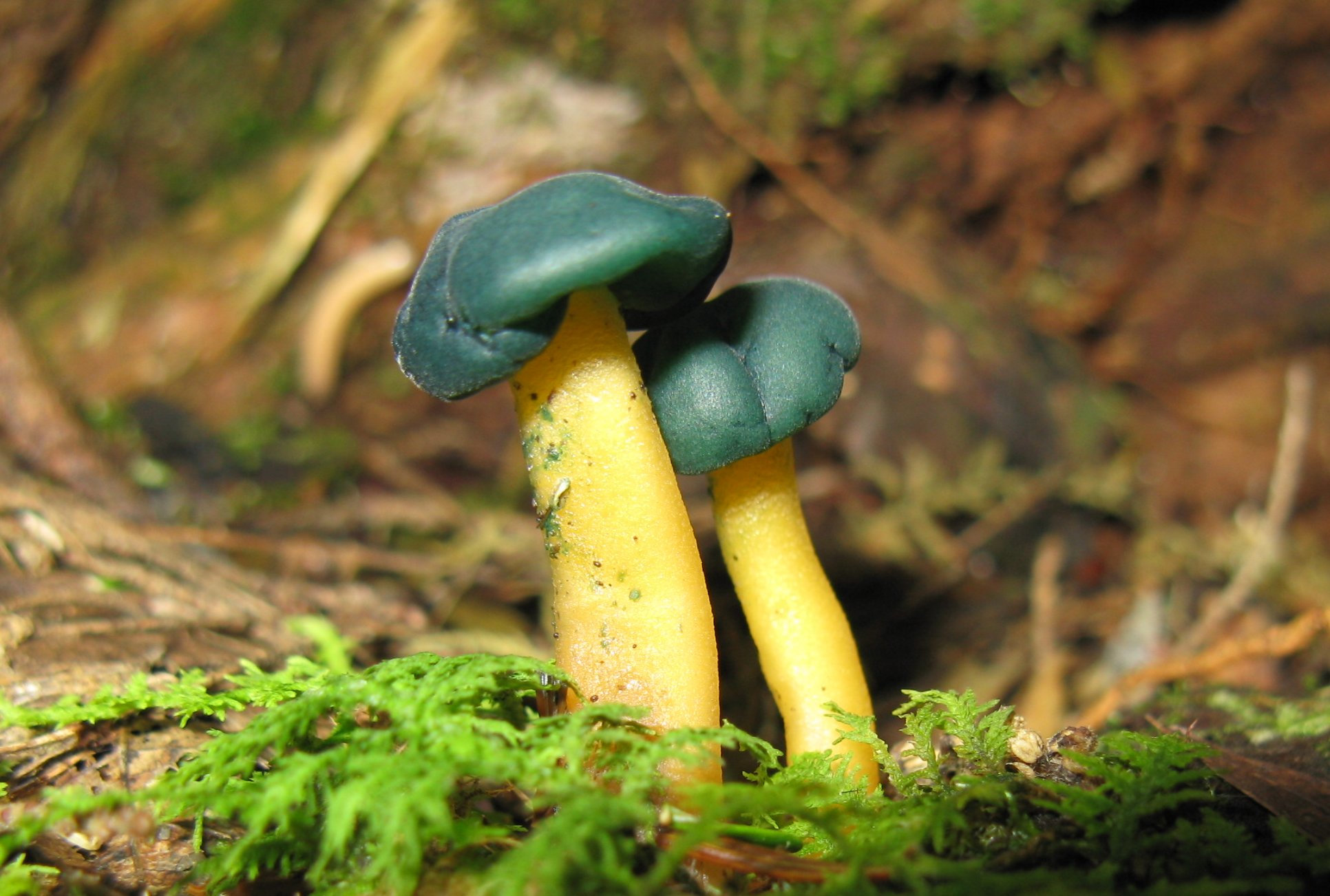
- Leotia viscosa

Scientific classification
- Kingdom: Fungi
- Division: Ascomycota
- Class: Leotiomycetes
- Order: Leotiales
- Family: Leotiaceae; Corda (1842)

Type genus
- Leotia Pers (1794)

Genera
- Alatospora; Geocoryne; Gelatinipulvinella; Leotia; Microglossum; Pezoloma; Potridiscus

= Leotiaceae =

Family of fungi

The Leotiaceae are a family of fungi in the order Leotiales. Species in this family are saprobic, and have a wide distribution, especially in temperate regions. The family contains 7 genera and 34 species.
