= Screaming jelly babies =

Classical chemical demonstration

"Screaming Jelly Babies" (British English), also known as "Growling Gummy Bears" (American and Canadian English), is a classroom chemistry demonstration in which a piece of candy bursts loudly into flame when dropped into potassium chlorate. The experiment is practiced in schools around the world and is often used at open evenings to show the more engaging and entertaining aspects of science in secondary education settings.

== Description ==
Candy being dropped into molten salt

The experiment shows the amount of energy there is in a piece of candy. Jelly babies or gummy bears are often used for theatrics. Potassium chlorate, a strong oxidising agent, rapidly oxidises the sugar in the candy causing it to burst into flames. The reaction produces a "screaming" sound as rapidly expanding gases are emitted from the test tube. The aroma of caramel is given off. Other carbohydrate or hydrocarbon containing substances can be dropped into test tubes of molten chlorate to produce similar results.

== Net reaction ==
4 KClO_{3} (s) + C_{12}H_{22}O_{11} (s) + 6 O_{2} (g) → 4 KCl + 12 CO_{2} (g) + 11 H_{2}O (g)

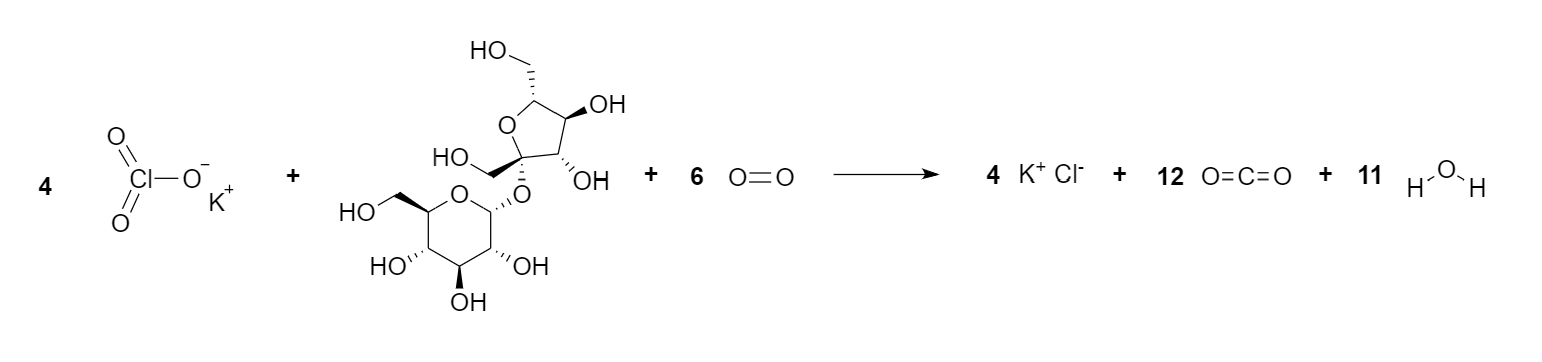

== Mechanism ==
The solid potassium chlorate is melted into a liquid.

KClO_{3} (s) + energy → K^{+}ClO^{−}_{3} (l)

The liquid potassium chlorate decomposes into potassium perchlorate and potassium chloride.

4 KClO_{3} → KCl + 3 KClO_{4}

The potassium perchlorate decomposes into potassium chloride and oxygen.

KClO_{4} → KCl + 2 O_{2}

The sugar in the candy reacts with oxygen, forming water and carbon dioxide. The reaction is exothermic and produces heat, smoke, and fire.

C_{12}H_{22}O_{11} (s) + 12 O_{2} (g) → 12 CO_{2} (g) + 11 H_{2}O (g) + energy

== Safety measures ==
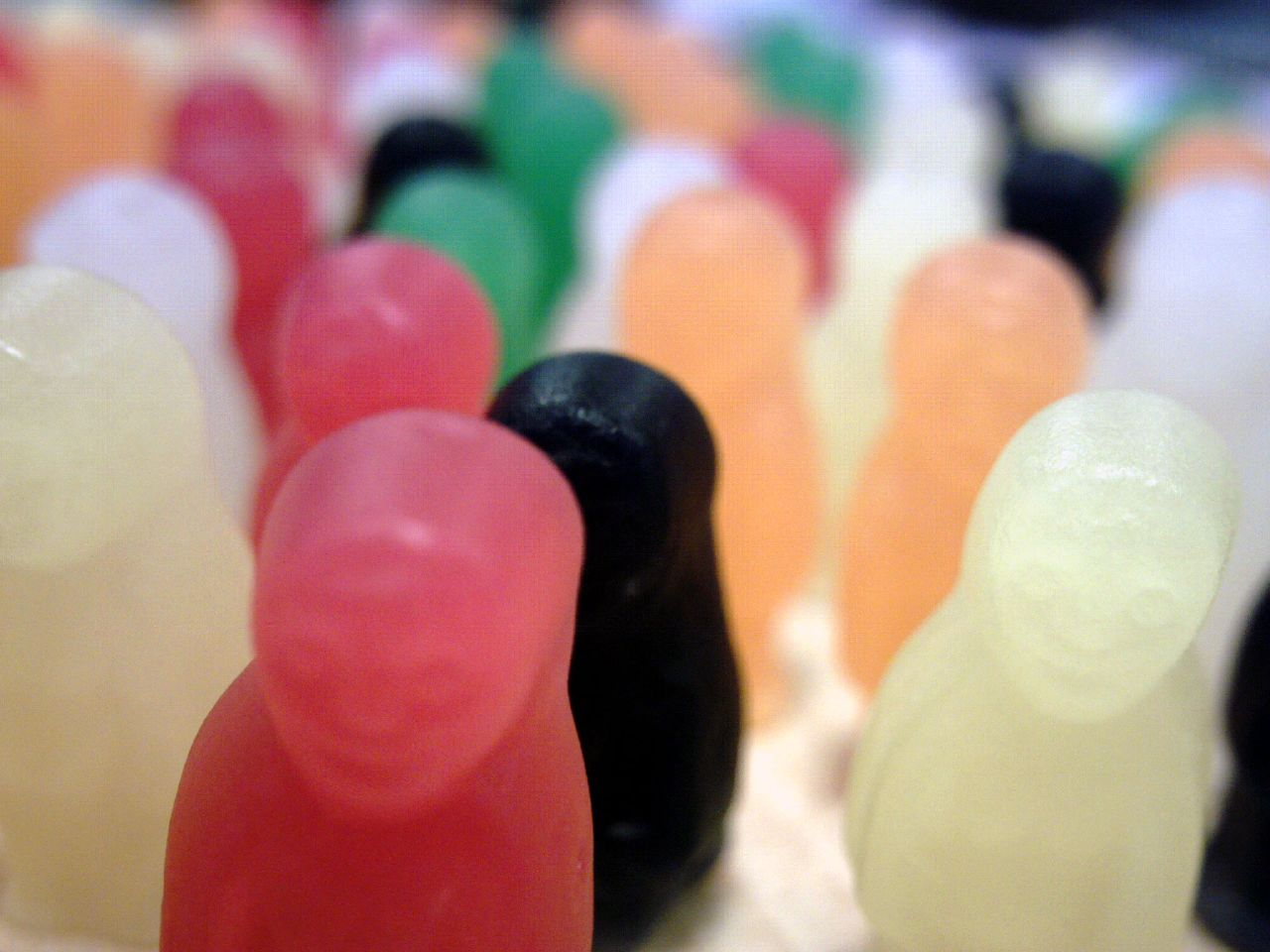
Jelly Babies

Care should be taken in performing this experiment, which should only be attempted by a professional. Potassium chlorate is a strong oxidizer and can cause fire or explosions. It is toxic by inhalation or ingestion and is hazardous to aquatic environments. Reagent grade potassium chlorate should be used. Upon completion of the demonstration, all chemicals should be disposed of in designated chemical waste containers to prevent harm to people or the environment.

All participants in the experiment should wear personal protective equipment, including eye protection, and should stand a safe distance away from the demonstration. A face-shield and heat resistant gloves should be worn by the person adding the jelly baby to the molten potassium chlorate.

== Variations ==
Deviation from the experiment is not recommended, and has been linked with accidents. Candy with low moisture content or high surface area may cause explosions.
