= Jelly Babies =

Type of British sugar crusted sweet

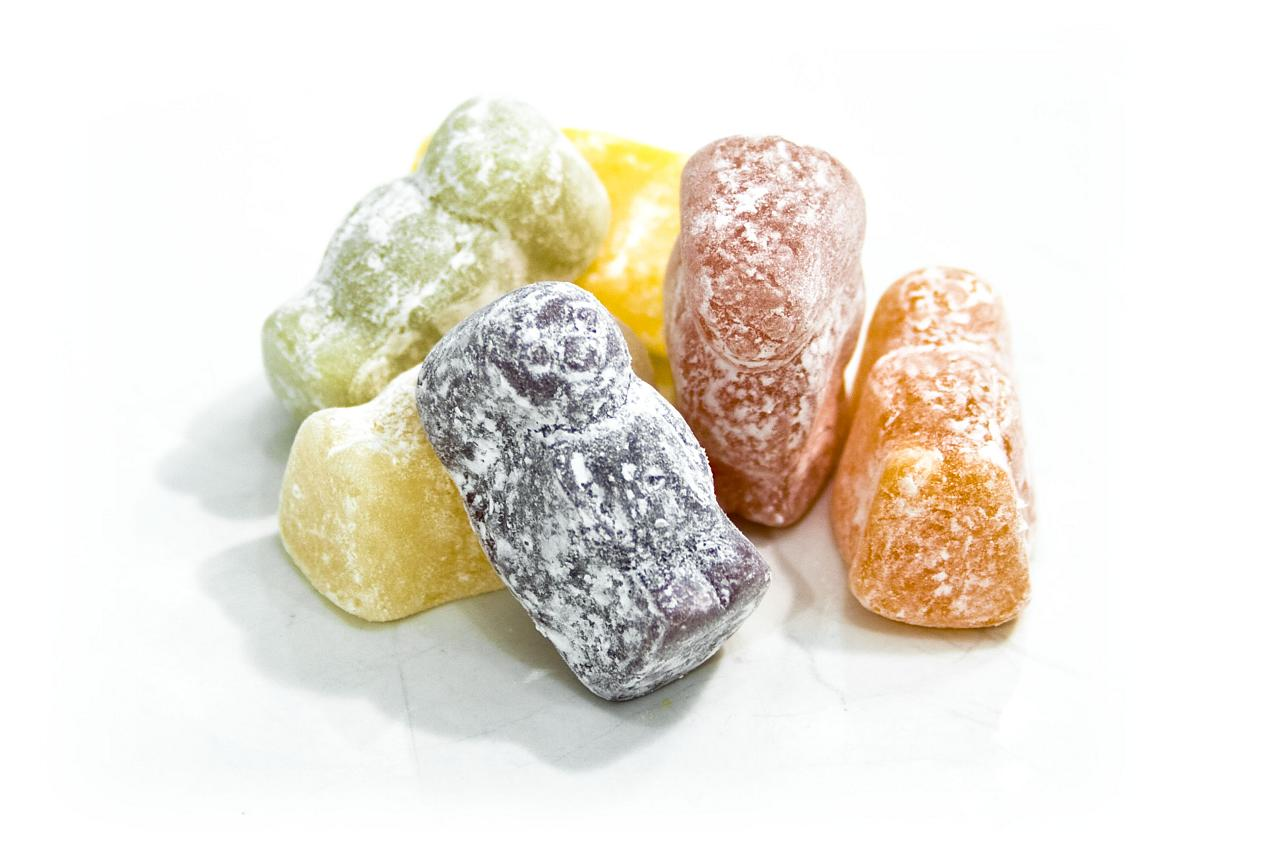
- Alternative names: Peace Babies, Unclaimed Babies
- Type: Gummy candy
- Place of origin: United Kingdom
- Region or state: Lancashire, England
- Created by: Fryers of Lancashire
- Main ingredients: Gelatin

Jelly Babies are a type of soft sugar jelly sweets in the shape of plump babies, sold in a variety of colours. They were first manufactured in Lancashire, England, in the nineteenth century. Their popularity waned before being revived by Bassett's of Sheffield in Yorkshire, who began mass-producing Jelly Babies (initially sold as "Unclaimed Babies") in 1918.

== History ==
"Jelly Babies" are known at least since advertisements by Riches Confectionery Company of 22 Duke Street, London Bridge in 1885, along with a variety of other baby sweets, including "Tiny Totties" and "Sloper’s Babies". But the pricing of these, at one farthing each, suggests that they were very much larger than the modern Jelly Baby.

The sweets were invented in 1864 by an Austrian immigrant working at Fryers of Lancashire, and were originally marketed as "Unclaimed Babies". By 1918 they were produced by Bassett's in Sheffield as "Peace Babies", to mark the end of World War I. Bassett's themselves have supported the "Peace Babies" name. Production was suspended during World War II due to wartime shortages. The product was relaunched as "Jelly Babies" in 1953.

A line of sweets called Jellyatrics was launched by Barnack Confectionery Ltd to commemorate the "Jelly Baby's 80th Birthday" in March 1999. Jellyatrics celebrate "all that is great and good about the older generation".

== Manufacture ==
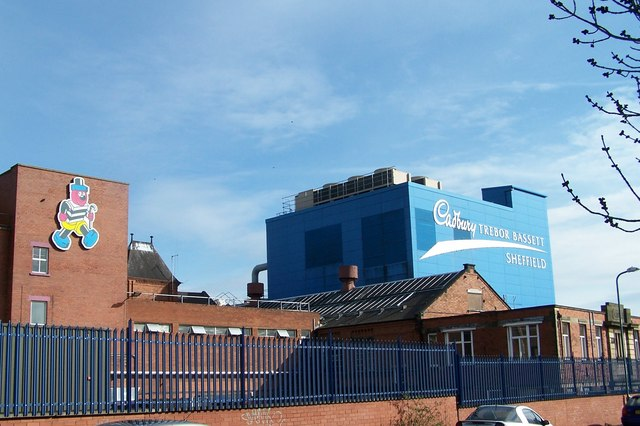
Jelly Babies in the UK are manufactured at Cadbury Trebor Bassett (the former Bassett's factory) in the Owlerton suburb of Sheffield.

The most modern manufacturer of Jelly Babies, Bassett's, now allocate individual name, shape, colour and flavour to different babies: Brilliant (red; strawberry), Bubbles (yellow; lemon), Baby Bonny (pink; raspberry), Boofuls (green; lime), Big Heart (purple; blackcurrant), and Bumper (orange).

The introduction of different shapes and names was an innovation, circa 1989, prior to which all colours of jelly baby were a uniform shape. Bassett's Jelly Babies changed in September 2007 to include only natural colours and ingredients. There are many brands of jelly babies, including Haribo Jelly Babies, as well as supermarket own brands.

Jelly Babies manufactured in the United Kingdom tend to be dusted in starch, which is left over from the manufacturing process, where it is used to aid release from the mould. Jelly Babies manufactured in Australia generally lack this coating. Like most other gummy sweets, they contain gelatin.

== In popular culture ==
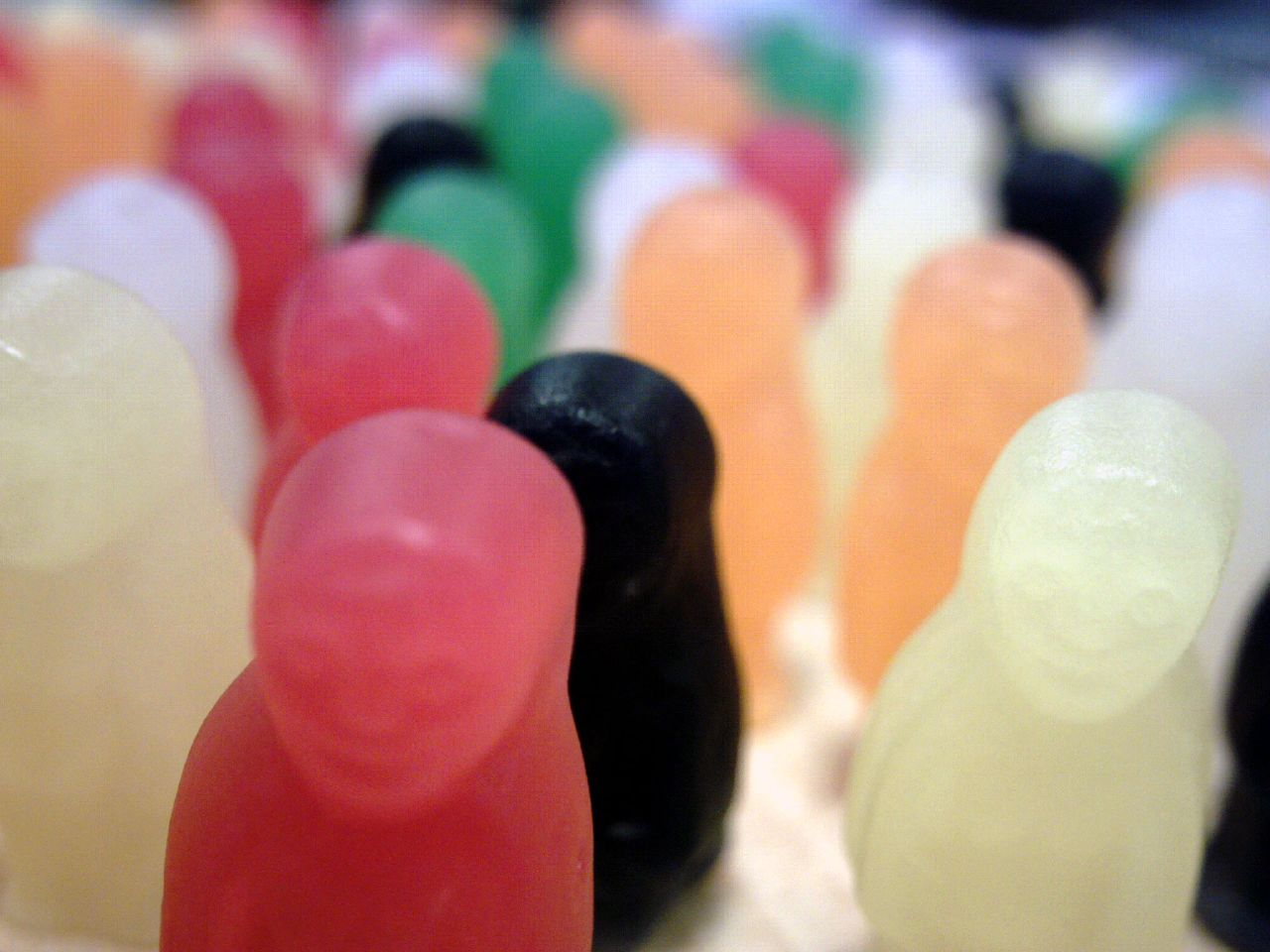
Jelly Babies

In October 1963, as Beatlemania was breaking out, fans of the Beatles in the United Kingdom pelted the band with jelly babies (or, in the United States, the much harder jelly beans) after it was reported that George Harrison liked them.

Beginning in the Second Doctor era of the popular British science fiction television series Doctor Who, but especially during that of Tom Baker's Fourth Doctor, jelly babies were frequently featured as a plot device in which the Doctor would attempt to ease an awkward moment or prevent potential conflict with an unfamiliar being by offering, "would you like a jelly baby?"

In the series by Terry Pratchett, Discworld, the country of Djelibeybi (a pun on "jelly baby", but putatively meaning "Child of the (River) Djel", and possibly derived from djellaba), is the Discworld's analogue of Ancient Egypt. The main setting of Pyramids, Djelibeybi is about two miles (3200 m) wide, along the 150-mile (240 km) length of the Djel.

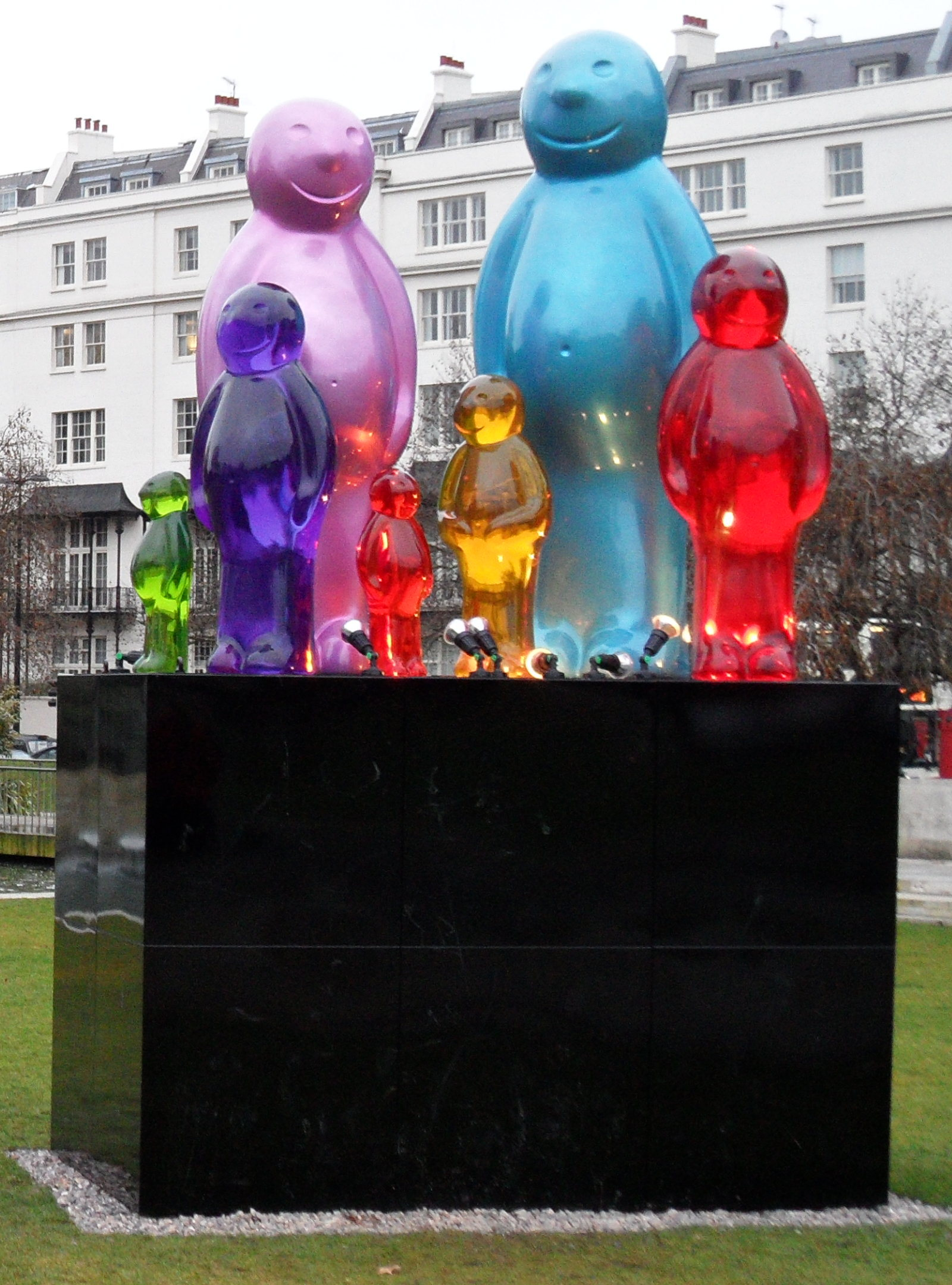
Jelly Baby Family, a sculpture by Mauro Perucchetti, near London's Marble Arch

The Australian singer Alison Hams released the "Jelly Baby Song" in May 2013 – its content alluding to the consumption of jelly babies by Type 1 Diabetics to overcome hypoglycaemic episodes – as a way to raise awareness for Type 1 Diabetes, for JDRF Australia (Juvenile Diabetes Research Foundation) who sell specially packaged jelly babies, as the focus of their annual campaign "Jelly Baby Month".

A popular school chemistry experiment is to put them in a strong oxidising agent, and see the resulting spectacular reaction. The experiment is commonly referred to as "screaming jelly babies".

A poll of 4,000 adults in Britain voted jelly babies their sixth favourite sweet in August 2009. Jelly Babies are the favourite snack of Basil Brush, a British fox puppet.

In the 2018 film Johnny English Strikes Again, Johnny English, played by Rowan Atkinson, carries a box of jelly babies with him, but they are actually disguised explosives, as in said context, "jelly" is actually short for gelignite, and they blow up whomever eats them.
