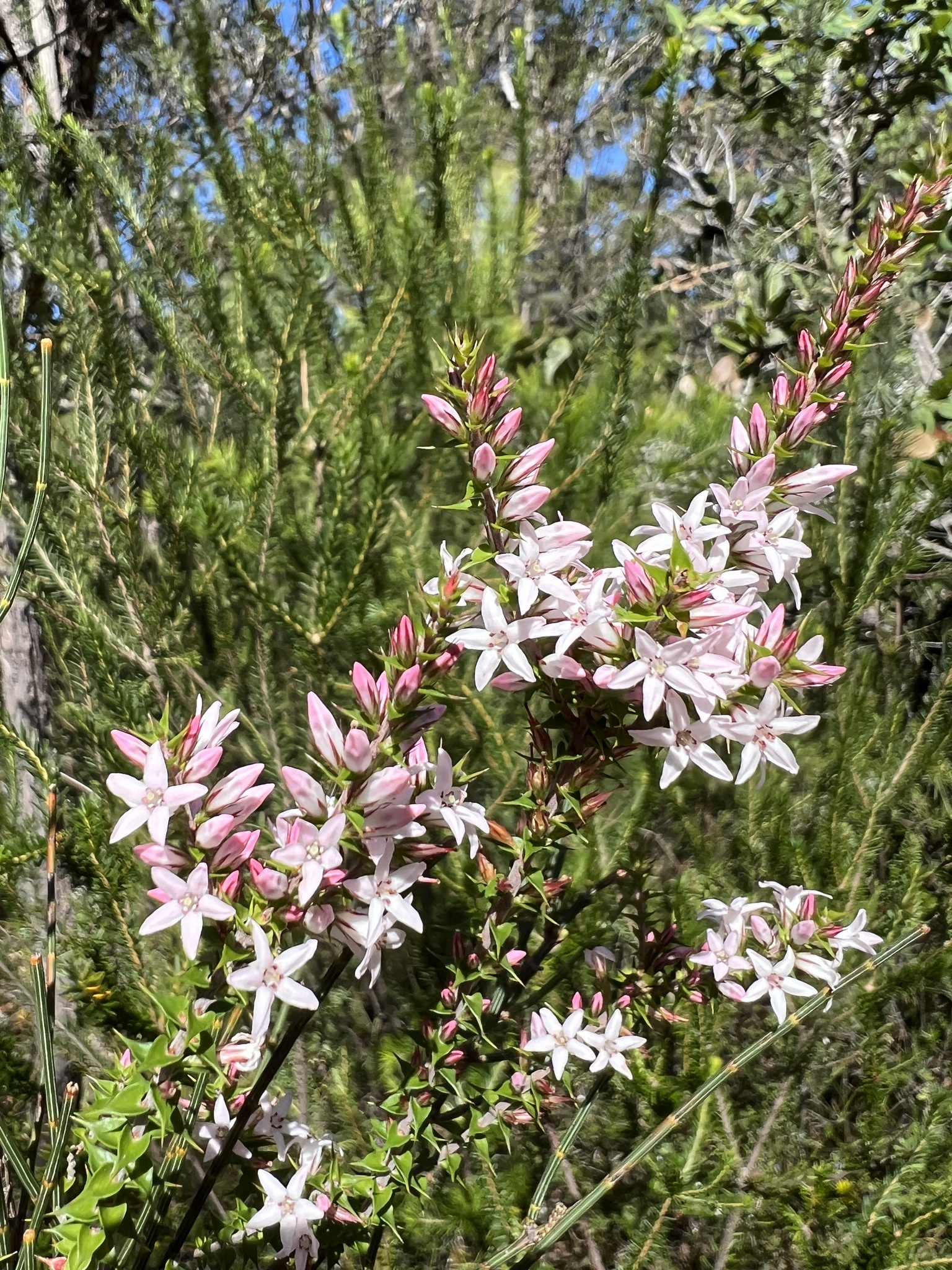
- In Ku-ring-gai Chase National Park

Scientific classification
- Kingdom: Plantae
- Clade: Tracheophytes
- Clade: Angiosperms
- Clade: Eudicots
- Clade: Asterids
- Order: Ericales
- Family: Ericaceae
- Genus: Epacris
- Species: E. pulchella

Binomial name
- Epacris pulchella Cav.

Synonyms
- Epacris pulchella Cav. var. pulchella; Epacris pulchella var. genuina Hochr. nom. inval.

= Epacris pulchella =

Species of flowering plant

Epacris pulchella, commonly known as wallum heath or coral heath is a species of flowering plant in the family Ericaceae and is endemic to eastern Australia. It is a slender, erect shrub with egg-shaped, pointed leaves and white or pinkish, tube-shaped flowers.

== Description ==
Epacris pulchella is a slender, erect shrub that typically grows to a height of 0.4–1.5 m (1 ft 4 in – 4 ft 11 in) and has only a few woolly-hairy branches, the stems with inconspicuous leaf scars. The leaves are egg-shaped, with a heart-shaped base and long, tapering tip, 2.1–6.5 mm (0.083–0.256 in) long and 1.4–4.0 mm (0.055–0.157 in) wide on a petiole 0.5–0.8 mm (0.020–0.031 in) long. The flowers are arranged in leaf axils extending down the branches and are white or pinkish and 5–8 mm (0.20–0.31 in) wide, each flower on a peduncle 1.5–2.0 mm (0.059–0.079 in) long. The sepals are 2.8–5.0 mm (0.11–0.20 in) long and the petals are joined at the base to form a tube 3.0–5.5 mm (0.12–0.22 in) long with lobes 2.5–3.5 mm (0.098–0.138 in) long. The anthers protrude beyond the end of the petal tube. Flowering occurs from January to May with a peak in March, and the fruit is a capsule 2 mm (0.079 in) long. This species is similar to E. microphylla but has longer leaves and flowers.

== Taxonomy and naming ==
Epacris pulchella was first formally described by Antonio José Cavanilles in 1797 and the description was published in his book Icones et descriptiones plantarum. The specific epithet (pulchella) means "beautiful and small".

== Distribution and habitat ==
Wallum heath grows in heath, woodland and forest on ridgetops and hillsides on the coast and nearby tablelands from south-east Queensland to near Conjola in south-eastern New South Wales.
