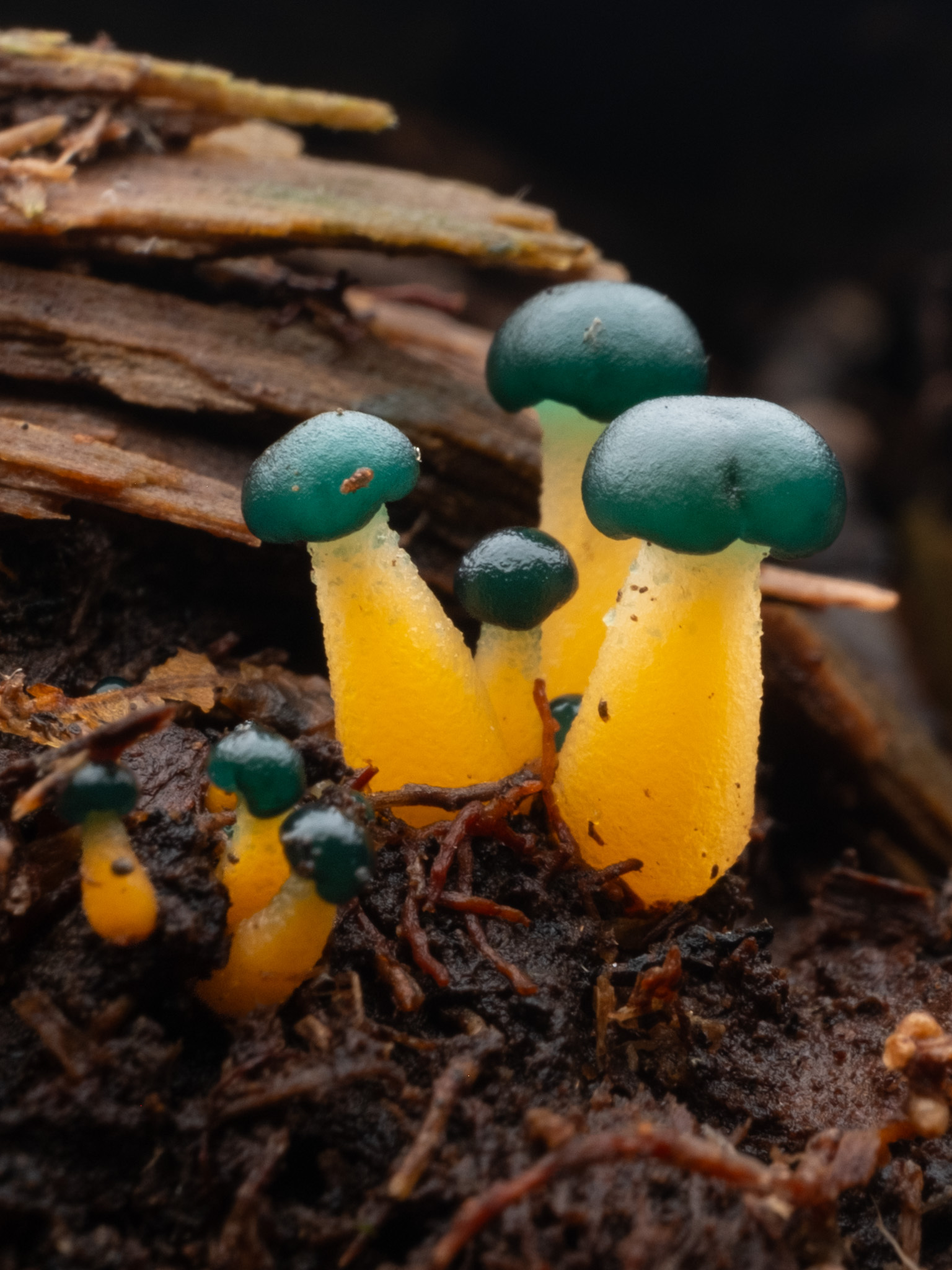

Scientific classification
- Kingdom: Fungi
- Division: Ascomycota
- Class: Leotiomycetes
- Order: Leotiales
- Family: Leotiaceae
- Genus: Leotia
- Species: L. viscosa

Binomial name
- Leotia viscosa Fr. (1822)

= Leotia viscosa =

Species of fungus

Leotia viscosa
- Mycological characteristics
- Smooth hymenium
- Cap is convex
- Hymenium attachment is not applicable
- Stipe is bare
- Spore print is white
- Ecology is saprotrophic
- Edibility is unknown

Leotia viscosa, commonly known as chicken lips, as well as jelly baby and green jelly drops, is a species of mushroom in the Leotiaceae family. Its stipe is yellow and the cap is green. The cap comes in a variety of shapes. L. viscosa is known from North America and China.

The species grows under oak trees or on dead logs. It is regarded as nonpoisonous.
