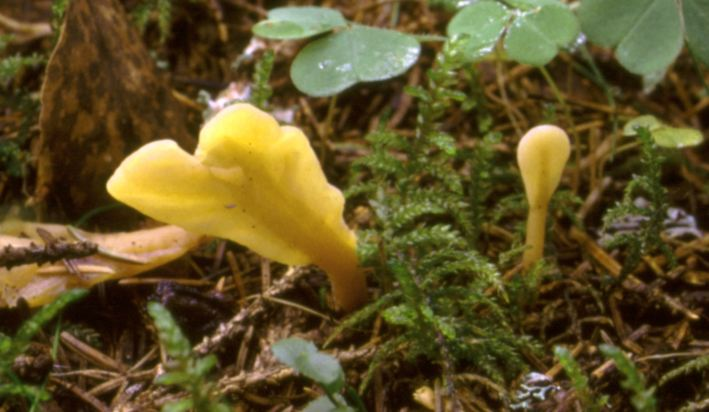
- Spathularia flavida

Scientific classification
- Kingdom: Fungi
- Division: Ascomycota
- Class: Leotiomycetes
- Order: Rhytismatales
- Family: Cudoniaceae; P.F.Cannon (2001)

Type genus
- Cudonia Fr. (1849)

Genera
- Cudonia; Spathularia; Spathulariopsis

= Cudoniaceae =

Family of fungi

The Cudoniaceae are a family of fungi in the Rhytismatales order. The family contains three genera: Cudonia, Spathularia, and Spathulariopsis. Species of Cudoniaceae are widespread in northern temperate regions.
