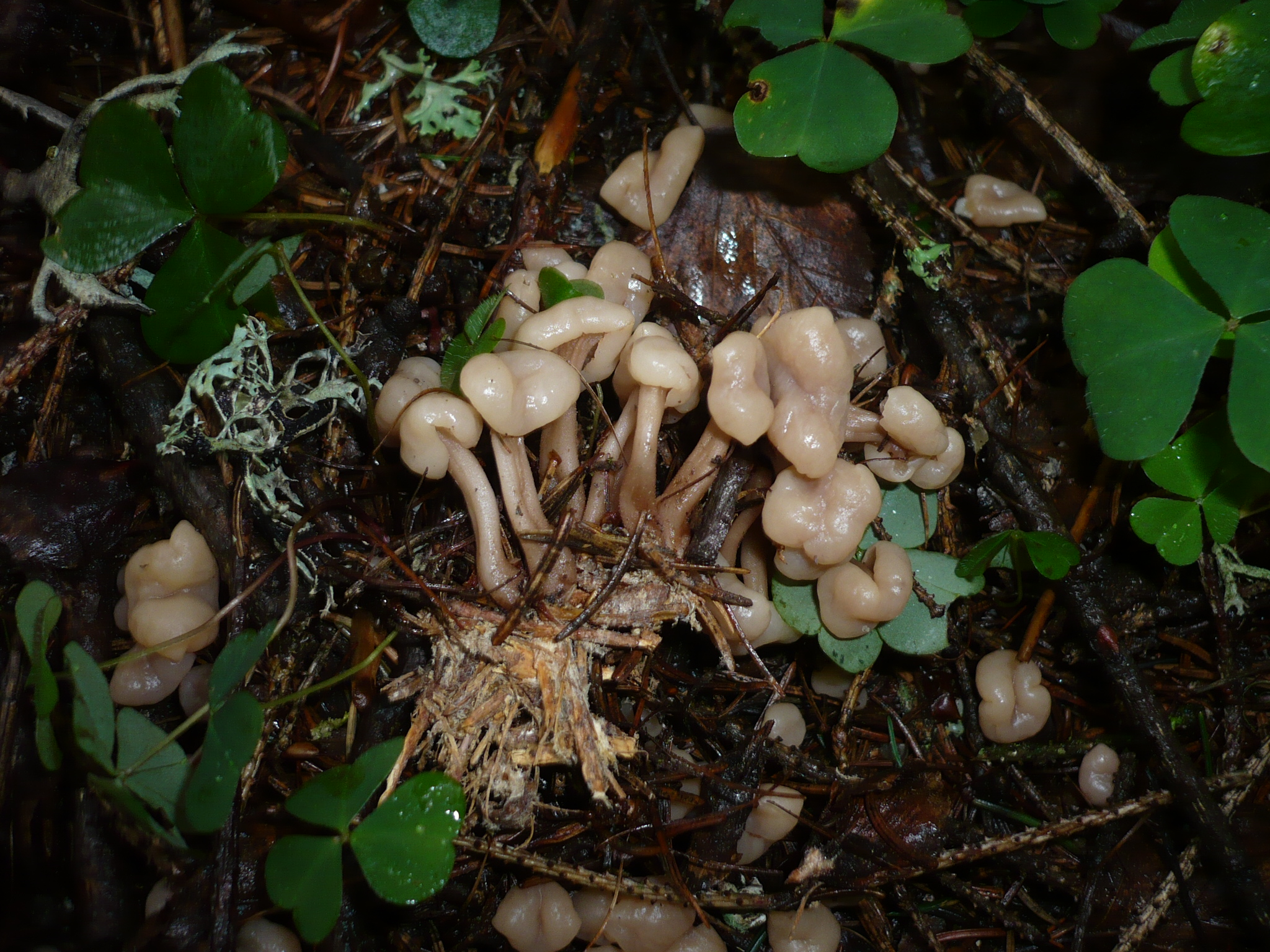
- Cudonia confusa

Scientific classification
- Kingdom: Fungi
- Division: Ascomycota
- Class: Leotiomycetes
- Order: Rhytismatales
- Family: Cudoniaceae
- Genus: Cudonia; Fr. (1849)

Type species
- Cudonia circinans (Pers.) Fr. (1849)

Species
- C. circinans C. clandestida C. confusa C. grisea C. helvelloides C. japonica C. osterwaldii C. sichuanensis

= Cudonia =

Genus of fungi

Cudonia is a genus of fungi within the family Cudoniaceae. The genus is widespread in temperate regions and its species are generally of unknown edibility. Cudonia circinans is poisonous and possibly deadly.
