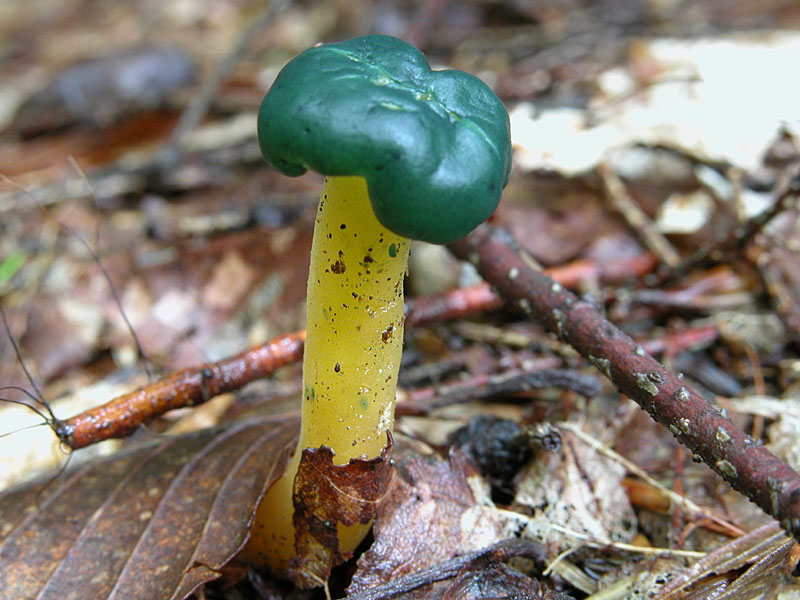
- Leotia viscosa

Scientific classification
- Kingdom: Fungi
- Division: Ascomycota
- Class: Leotiomycetes
- Order: Leotiales; Korf & Lizon (2001)

Families
- Cochlearomycetaceae; Leotiaceae; Mniaeciaceae; Tympanidaceae

= Leotiales =

Order of fungi

The Leotiales are an order of ascomycete fungi. The order contains four families and six genera of uncertain placement.

== Families ==
Leotales contains the following families:

- Cochlearomycetaceae
- Leotiaceae
- Mniaeciaceae
- Tympanidaceae

== Incertae sedis genera ==
The following genera are incertae sedis within the order Leotales:

- Alatospora Ingold
- Aotearoamyces P.R. Johnst., J.A. Cooper & Quijada
- Flagellospora Ingold
- Kobayasiyomyces G. Okada, A. Hashim. & Degawa
- Paraleotia Y.P. Tan & R.G. Shivas
- Scolecoleotia H.B. Jiang, Phookamsak & K.D. Hyde
