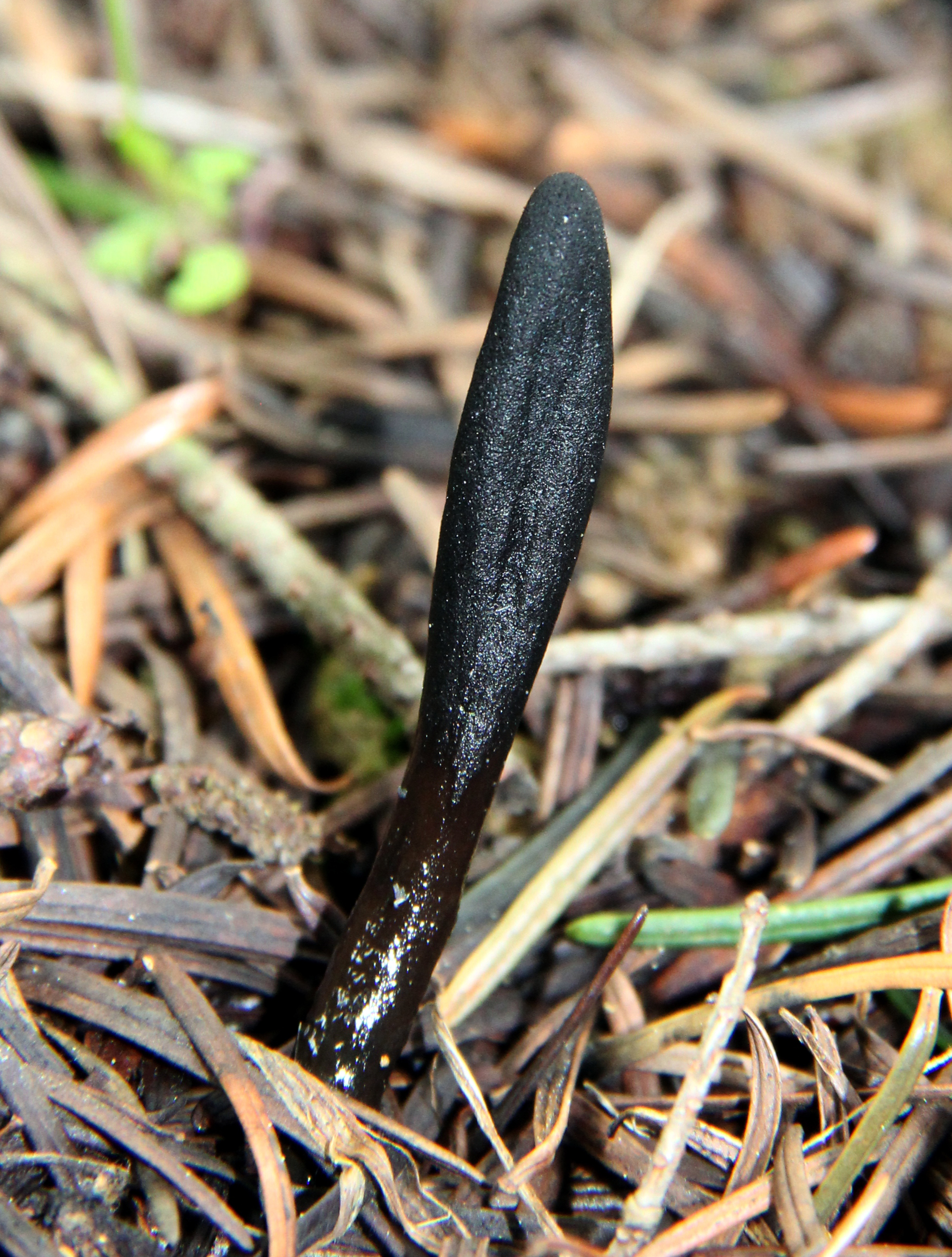

Scientific classification
- Kingdom: Fungi
- Division: Ascomycota
- Class: Geoglossomycetes
- Order: Geoglossales
- Family: Geoglossaceae
- Genus: Glutinoglossum
- Species: G. glutinosum

Binomial name
- Glutinoglossum glutinosum (Pers.) Hustad, A.N.Mill., Dentinger & P.F.Cannon (2013)

Synonyms
- Geoglossum glutinosum Pers. (1796); Geoglossum viscosum Pers. (1797); Geoglossum viscosulum Sacc. (1889); Gloeoglossum glutinosum (Pers.) E.J.Durand (1908); Cibalocoryne glutinosa (Pers.) S.Imai [as 'Cibarocoryne'] (1942)

= Glutinoglossum glutinosum =

Species of fungus

Glutinoglossum glutinosum, commonly known as the viscid black earth tongue or the glutinous earthtongue, is a species of fungus in the family Geoglossaceae (the earth tongues). First described in 1796 as a species of Geoglossum, the fungus has gone through several changes of genera in its taxonomic history. It was placed in its current genus, Glutinoglossum, in 2013.

The smooth, nearly black, club-shaped fruitbodies grow to heights ranging from 1.5 to 5 cm (1/2 to 2 in). The head is up to 0.7 cm (1/4 in) long, and the stipes are sticky. Several other black earth tongue species are quite similar in external appearance, and many can be reliably distinguished only by examining differences in microscopic characteristics, such as spores, asci, and paraphyses.

Widely distributed in the Northern Hemisphere, it has been found in northern Africa, Asia, Europe, and North America. Although previously thought to exist in Australasia, collections made from these locations have since been referred to new species. G. glutinosum is a saprophytic species that grows on soil in moss or in grassy areas.

== Taxonomy ==
- - - - - G. australasicum
        - - G. glutinosum
          - G. methvenii
      - G. exiguum
    - G. americanum
  - G. heptaseptatum

Cladogram showing phylogenetic relationships of Glutinoglossum species based on a four-gene dataset; from Hustad and Miller 2015.

The fungus was first officially described in 1796 as Geoglossum glutinosum by Dutch mycologist Christiaan Hendrik Persoon, who proposed several defining characteristics, including the black color; the smooth, compressed, club-shaped head (clavula) with grooves; and the somewhat curved and glutinous stipe. In 1908, Elias Judah Durand transferred it to Gloeoglossum, a genus he circumscribed to contain species with paraphyses (filamentous, sterile cells interspersed between the asci) present as a continuous gelatinous layer on the stipe; Gloeoglossum has since been reduced to synonymy with Geoglossum. In 1942 Japanese mycologist Sanshi Imai thought the species should be in Cibalocoryne, a genus name used earlier by Frigyes Ákos Hazslinszky, and so published Cibalocoryne glutinosa. Later authors thought Cibalocoryne to be ambiguous, and the name was synonymized with Geoglossum. Persoon also described the species Geoglossum viscosum (1801) and the variety Geoglossum glutinosum var. lubricum (1822), but both of these taxa were placed into synonymy with G. glutinosum by Elias Judah Durand in 1908.

The species was transferred by Vincent Hustad and colleagues to the newly created genus Glutinoglossum in 2013 when molecular analysis revealed that it and the species G. heptaseptatum formed a well-defined clade in the Geoglossaceae. In 2015, Hustad and Andrew Miller published an emended description of G. glutinosum with a narrower range of spore dimensions, suggesting that material collected in Australia and New Zealand represent unique species, which they referred to G. australasicum and G. exiguum. These species, along with G. americanum and G. methvenii, were added to Glutinoglossum in 2015. Hustad and Miller noted their new spore size range for G. glutinosum were more closely aligned with those given by Durand in his measurements of Persoon's type specimen.

=== Etymology ===
The specific epithet glutinosum is derived from the Latin word gluten, meaning "glue". The species is commonly known as the "viscid black earth tongue" or the "glutinous earthtongue".

== Description ==
Glutinoglossum glutinosum
- Mycological characteristics
- Smooth hymenium
- No distinct cap
- Hymenium attachment is irregular or not applicable
- Stipe is bare
- Ecology is mycorrhizal

"But of all the wicked-looking Fungi, none have so weird an appearance as the black Geoglossum. It is well termed Earth-tongue, for it springs in a tongue shape from the ground, black and glutinous."

— Margaret Mary Plues, 1863

The club-shaped fruitbodies, which have a distinct blackish head and a more lightly colored stipe (dark brown), grow to heights ranging from 1.5 to 5 cm (1/2 to 2 in). The head is up to 0.7 cm (1/4 in) tall, ranges in shape from fuse-shaped to narrowly ellipsoidal or nearly cylindrical, and is somewhat compressed on the sides. The nearly black, somewhat waxy head has a vertical groove down the middle. The stipe has a glutinous, dark grey-brown surface.

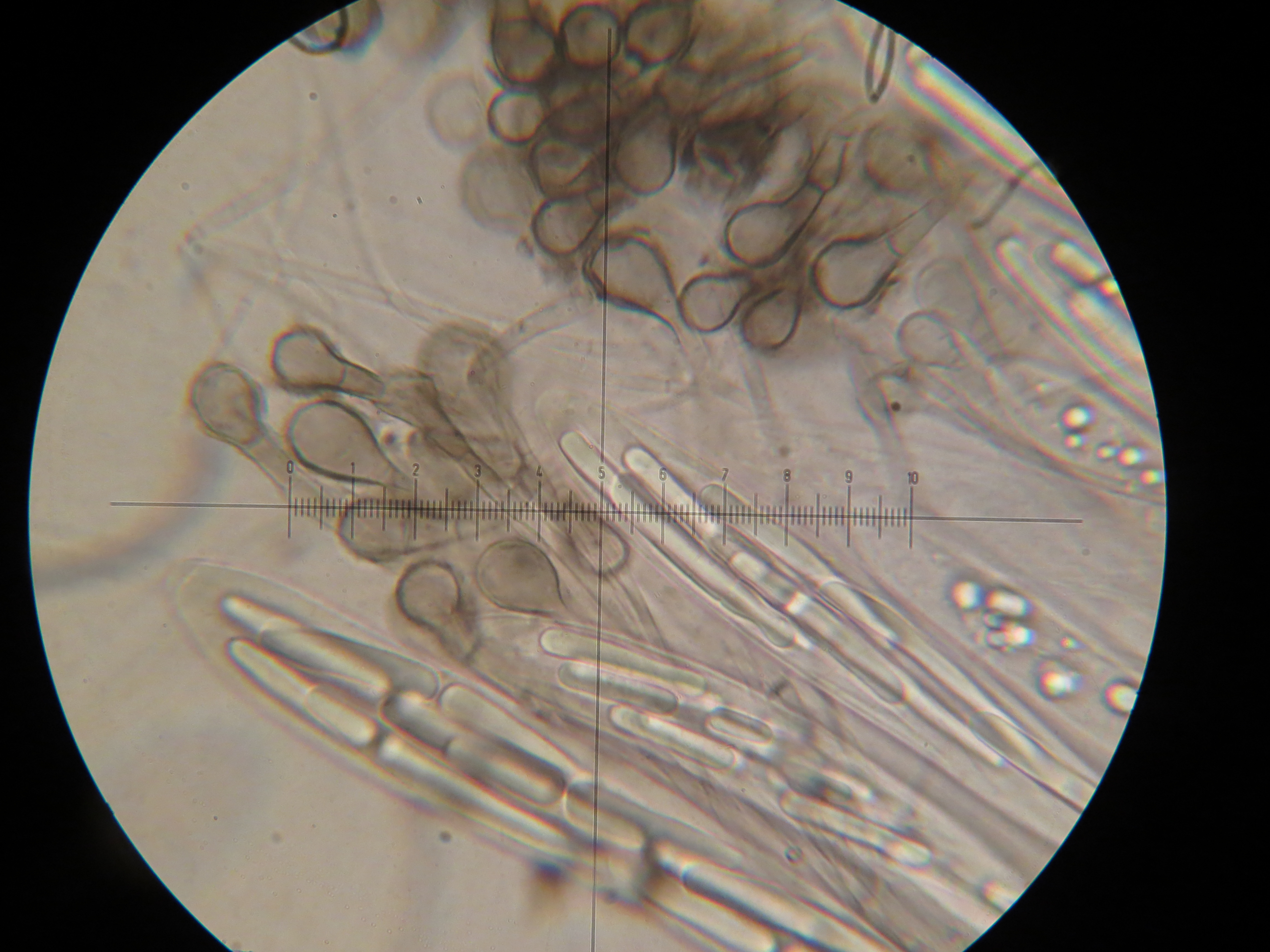
The pear-shaped or spherical tips of the paraphyses extend beyond the asci.

The spores are smooth and cylindrical, sometimes with a slight swelling in the middle, and sometimes slightly curved; they measure 59–65 by 4–5 μm. G. glutinosum spores have between two and seven septa, although three is most typical in mature specimens. The thin-walled asci (spore-bearing cells) are cylindrical to narrowly club-shaped, eight-spored, and typically measure 200–265 μm long by 12–16 μm wide. Ascospores occupy about the upper two-thirds to three-quarters of the ascus, leaving a hyaline (transparent) base. The paraphyses, hyaline at the base and brown in the upper regions, are 4–11 μm wide, and longer than the asci. Cells at the end of the paraphyses are pear-shaped (piriform) or spherical, brownish, and measure 8–10 μm wide. The sticky material on the stipe is a gelatinous matrix made of a layer of paraphyses.

Although black earth tongue species are generally not worth eating, Charles McIlvaine opined in his 1902 work One Thousand American Fungi that, if stewed, G. glutinosum is "delicious."

=== Similar species ===
Geoglossum nigritum is similar in appearance to Glutinoglossum glutinosum, but lacks a slimy stipe. Trichoglossum species, such as the common T. hirsutum, have a velvety surface texture acquired from thick-walled bristles called setae. Several other earth tongue species are roughly similar in external appearance to G. glutinosum, and can be difficult to distinguish from that species without considering distribution and microscopic characteristics such as the size and shape of the asci, ascospores, and paraphyses. Geoglossum peckianum and G. uliginosum can develop a glutinous stipe; the former has spores measuring 90–120 by 6–7 μm with 14 septa, while the latter has spores that are 60–80 by 4.5–6 μm with 7 septa. The Australasian species Glutinoglossum methvenii is distinguished from G. glutinosum by its short, stout ascospores (mostly measuring 70–80 by 5–6 μm) and the presence of curved to hooked paraphyses tips. G. australasicum, the most abundant Glutinoglossum species in Australasia, has asci measuring 205–270 by 17–20 μm, while those of G. exiguum are 165–260 by 13.5–17 μm. The latter species tends to have smaller fruitbodies, up to 3.5 cm (1.4 in) tall.

== Habitat and distribution ==
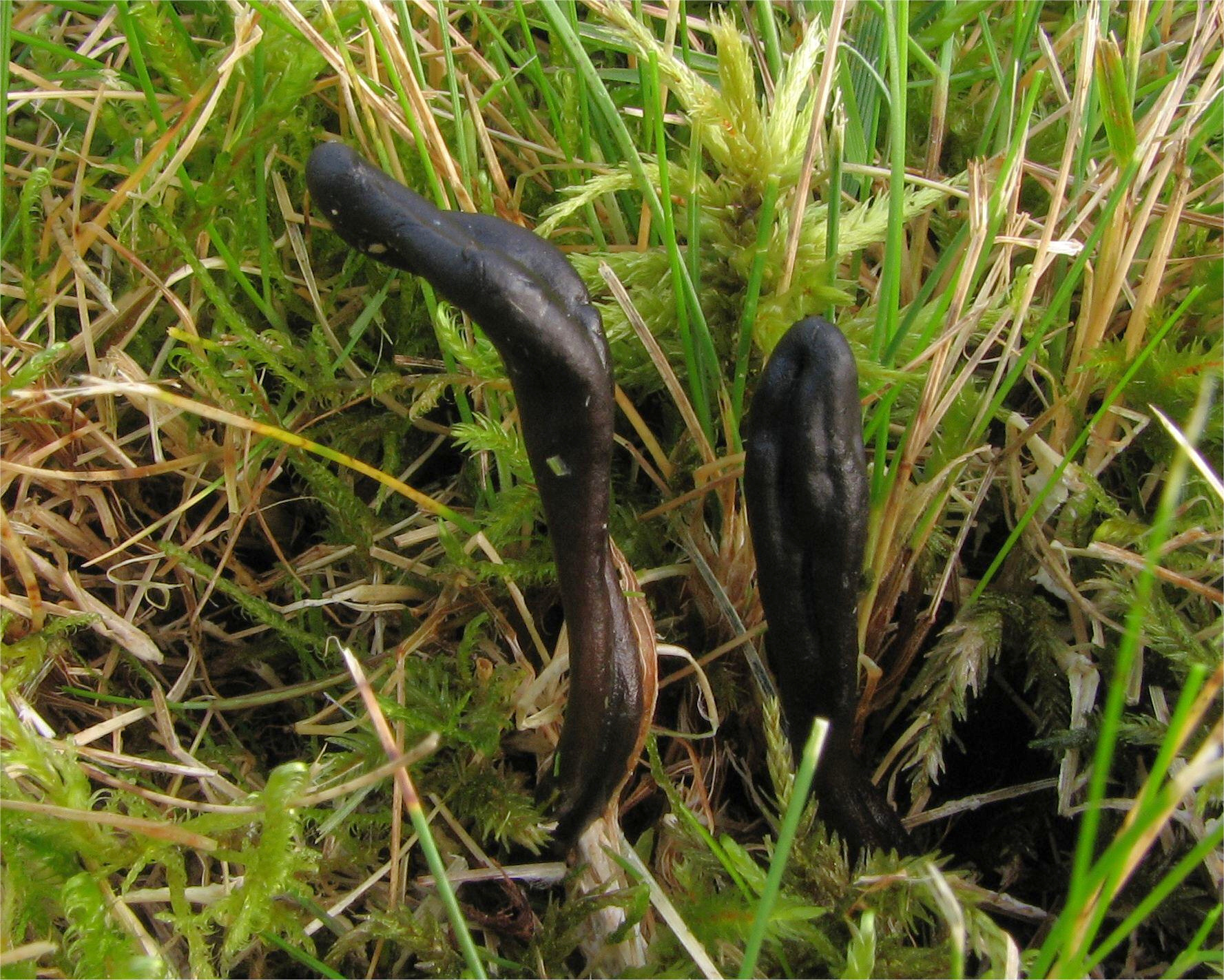
Fruitbodies found in Sweden

Glutinoglossum glutinosum is a saprophytic species. Its fruitbodies grow scattered on soil in moss beds or in grassy areas. North American collections are typically associated with hardwoods, while European collections are often made in pasture and dune slacks. The fungus has been used as an indicator of medium-quality grassland in the UK. In India, it has been encountered on the soil of oak forests, and among mosses on stony slopes at an elevation of 2,000 m (6,600 ft).

A widely distributed species, G. glutinosum has been recorded from northern Africa (Macaronesia), Asia (Bhutan, China, India, Japan, and the Philippines) and Europe. It is listed as vulnerable in Switzerland. In Bulgaria, where it is considered critically endangered, threats to G. glutinosum include "habitat changes as result of agriculture activities (crops, livestock), atmospheric and land pollution, drought, global warming". In a preliminary Regional Red List of Dutch macrofungi, G. glutinosum was considered threatened, and it was noted that before 1970, the fungus was "rather common", compared to "rather rare" after that year. The North American distribution includes Canada, the United States, and Mexico.

Although G. glutinosum was previously thought to have occurred in Australia and New Zealand, later examination and genetic analysis of collections from these locations showed the material to belong to what have since been described as the new species G. australasicum or G. exiguum.

== Uses ==
Any potential culinary value of the fruitbodies has been discussed little by experts, although Charles McIlvaine reported stewing about a quart of them.
