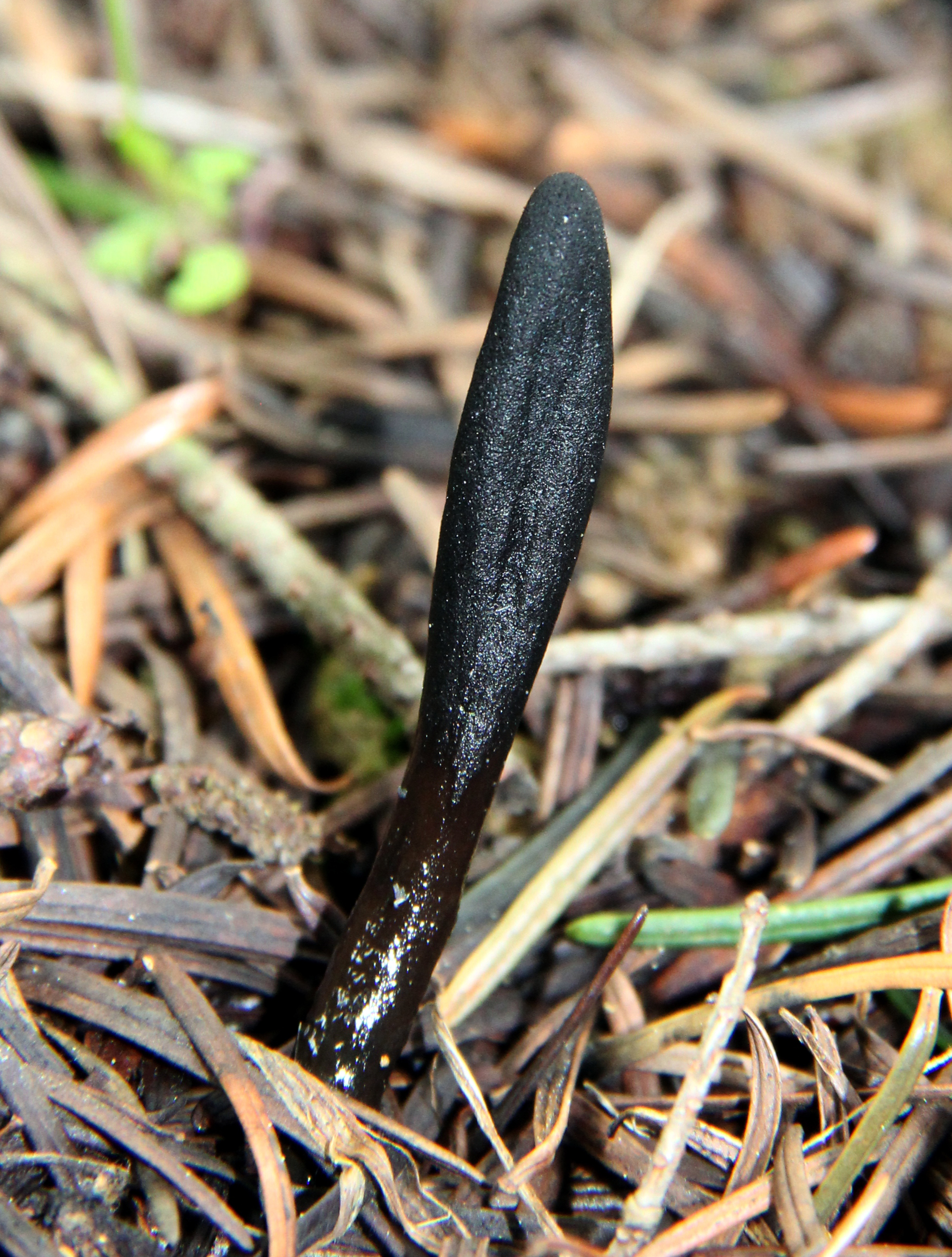
- Glutinoglossum glutinosum

Scientific classification
- Kingdom: Fungi
- Division: Ascomycota
- Class: Geoglossomycetes
- Order: Geoglossales
- Family: Geoglossaceae
- Genus: Glutinoglossum; Hustad, A.N.Mill., Dentinger & P.F.Cannon (2013)

Type species
- Glutinoglossum glutinosum (Pers.) Hustad, A.N.Mill., Dentinger & P.F.Cannon (2013)

Species
- Glutinoglossum americanum Glutinoglossum australasicum Glutinoglossum exiguum Glutinoglossum glutinosum Glutinoglossum heptaseptatum Glutinoglossum methvenii

= Glutinoglossum =

Genus of fungi

Glutinoglossum is a genus of six species of earth-tongue fungi in the family Geoglossaceae. The widespread type species, G. glutinosum, is commonly known as the "glutinous earth tongue". G. heptaseptatum is known only from the Czech Republic. Four additional species were described in 2015.

== Taxonomy ==
- - - - - - - - Gl. australasicum
              - - Gl. glutinosum
                - Gl. methvenii
            - Gl. exiguum
          - Gl. americanum
        - Gl. heptaseptatum
      - Trichoglossum hirsutum
    - Geoglossum difforme
  - Sabuloglossum arenarium

Cladogram showing phylogenetic relationships of Glutinoglossum and related species based on a four-gene dataset.

The genus was circumscribed in 2013 to contain the type species Glutinoglossum glutinosum (formerly known as Geoglossum glutinosum), and a new species, G. heptaseptatum, found in the Czech Republic. Molecular analysis showed that the two species form one of five well-defined clades in the Geoglossaceae. Sabuloglossum was another genus newly described as a result of this analysis. Although the Glutinoglossum species are not distinguishable by gross morphological features alone, they can be distinguished by their microscopic characteristics, and have an 8–10% DNA sequence dissimilarity in their internal transcribed spacer regions.

The generic name Glutinoglossum (derived from the Latin glutinosus, meaning "glutinous") refers to the sticky fruit bodies. G. glutinosum is commonly known as the "viscid black earth tongue".

== Description ==
The club-shaped fruit bodies of Glutinoglossum species are sticky or gelatinous and black. The fertile hymenium (spore-bearing surface) is at the upper portion, or "head". The gelatinous layer on the surface comprises a distinct layer of mostly straight paraphyses. The asci (spore-bearing cells) are club-shaped to cylindrical. The slow-maturing spores are initially hyaline (translucent) and lack septa, but eventually turn brown and develop septation.

Although the viscid ascocarp surface is a helpful field characteristic that can be used to distinguish Glutinoglossum species, the character is not strictly unique to this genus–Geoglossum difforme also has sticky fruit bodies, but it is a member of the Geoglossum clade.

== Habitat and distribution ==
The fruit bodies of Glutinoglossum grow on the ground in moist areas. The type G. glutinosum is widely distributed, having been reported from Australia, Africa, Asia, Europe, New Zealand, and North America. European sightings are commonly associated with pastures and dune slacks, while in North America the fungus is often reported with hardwood trees. G. heptaseptatum is known only from the type locality—a protected experimental pasture in Hradec Králové. Some literature suggests that the species, or one similar, may be present in Asia, Australia, and North America. Neither species of Glutinoglossum has been formally assessed for conservation purposes.

New Zealand Glutinoglossum species have been parasitized by the fungus Hypomyces papulasporae, which appears as a white, cottony mycelium that extends to the base of the stipe.
