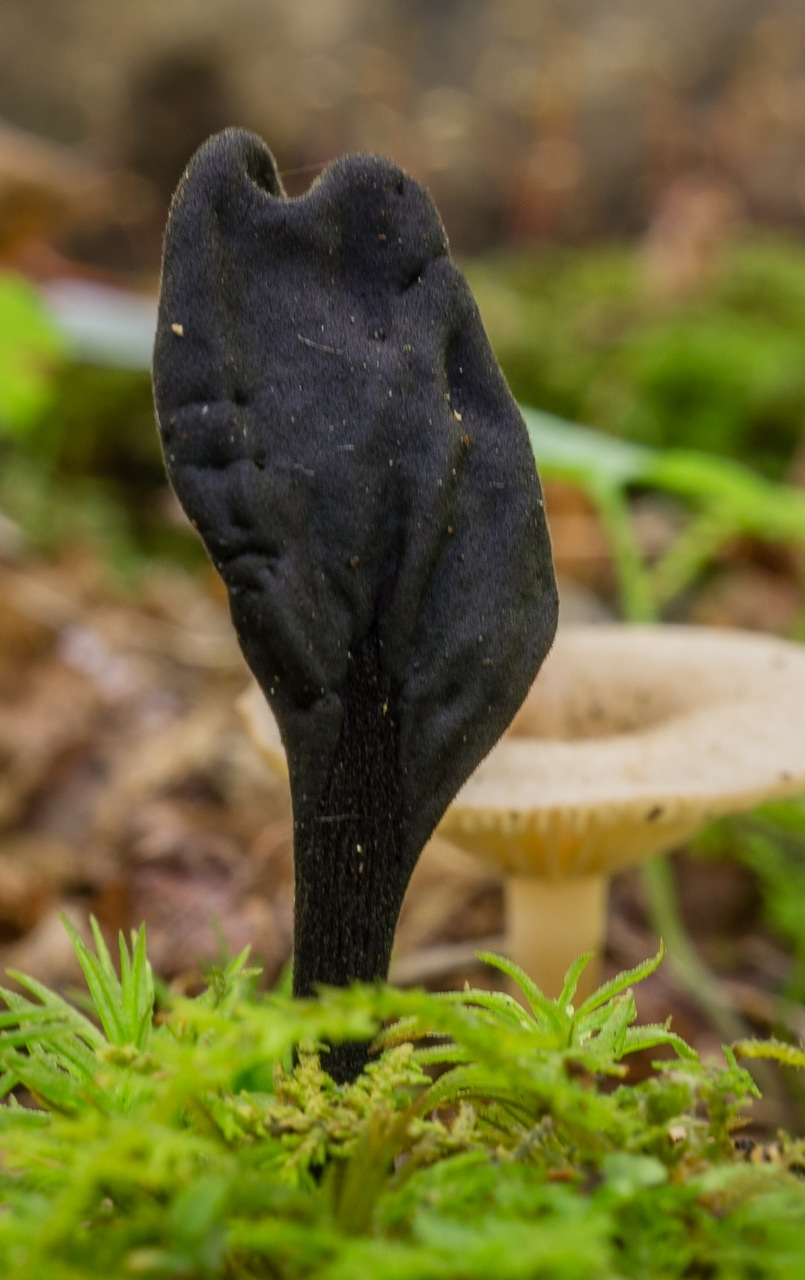
- Trichoglossum walteri, Virginia, USA

Conservation status
- Vulnerable (IUCN 3.1)

Scientific classification
- Kingdom: Fungi
- Division: Ascomycota
- Class: Geoglossomycetes
- Order: Geoglossales
- Family: Geoglossaceae
- Genus: Trichoglossum
- Species: T. walteri

Binomial name
- Trichoglossum walteri (Berk.) E.J. Durand (1908)

Synonyms
- Geoglossum walteri Berk. (1875)

= Trichoglossum walteri =

Species of fungus

Trichoglossum walteri is a species of fungus in the family Geoglossaceae. In its current sense, it is considered to be cosmopolitan and as such represents a complex of species worldwide. In the UK, it has been given the recommended English name of short-spored earthtongue. The European species occurs mainly in agriculturally unimproved grassland and threats to this habitat have resulted in the short-spored earthtongue being assessed as globally "vulnerable" on the IUCN Red List of Threatened Species.

== Taxonomy ==
The species was first described by English mycologist Miles Joseph Berkeley in 1875 as Geoglossum walteri. His description was based on an Australian collection and in its strict sense Trichoglossum walteri may be restricted to the southern hemisphere. The name was, however, adopted for collections with similar microscopic features in North and South America, Europe, and Asia. It seems probable that some of these collections represent distinct species. Initial molecular research, based on cladistic analysis of DNA sequences, supports this conclusion and also indicates that Trichoglossum walteri sensu lato is not closely related to the type species of Trichoglossum, but belongs in a separate genus as yet not formally named.

== Description ==
Ascocarps are club-shaped, up to 35 mm (1.5 in) tall, black to dark brown, with a swollen, spore-bearing head, up to half the ascocarp height, and a finely hirsute, cylindrical stipe (stem). Microscopically, dark, thick-walled, acute setae are present. The asci are 8-spored, the ascospores 90–100 × 4.5–5.5 μm, becoming 7-septate at maturity. North temperate collections differ in being larger, up to 100 mm (4 in) tall, and in having shorter ascospores, 75–85 × 4.5–5.5 μm.

=== Similar species ===
All Trichoglossum species appear similar in the field and can only be identified by microscopic examination. In European grassland, the short-spored earthtongue is most easily confused with the much commoner Trichoglossum hirsutum which has longer spores that become 15-septate at maturity.

== Conservation ==
In Europe the short-spored earthtongue is typical of waxcap grasslands, a declining habitat due to changing agricultural practices. As a result, the species is of global conservation concern and is listed as "vulnerable" on the IUCN Red List of Threatened Species.
