= Leucoglossum =

Scientific classification
- Kingdom: Fungi
- Division: Ascomycota
- Class: Geoglossomycetes
- Order: Geoglossales
- Family: Geoglossaceae
- Genus: Leucoglossum; S.Imai (1942)

Type species
- Leucoglossum durandii (Teng) S.Imai (1942)

Species
- L. durandii L. leucosporum

Genus of fungi

Leucoglossum is a genus of fungi in the earth tongue family Geoglossaceae. The genus was formally circumscribed by Japanese mycologist Sanshi Imai in 1942. Leucoglossum contains two species: the type, L. durandii, and L. leucosporum, which was added to the genus in 2014. Both species resemble those found in Trichoglossum, but can be distinguished from that genus by having hyaline (translucent) ascospores that turn brownish only when mature. L. durandii is found in China, while L. leucosporum occurs in Europe. Molecular studies indicate that Leucoglossum is a monophyletic group more closely related to Geoglossum than Trichoglossum.
