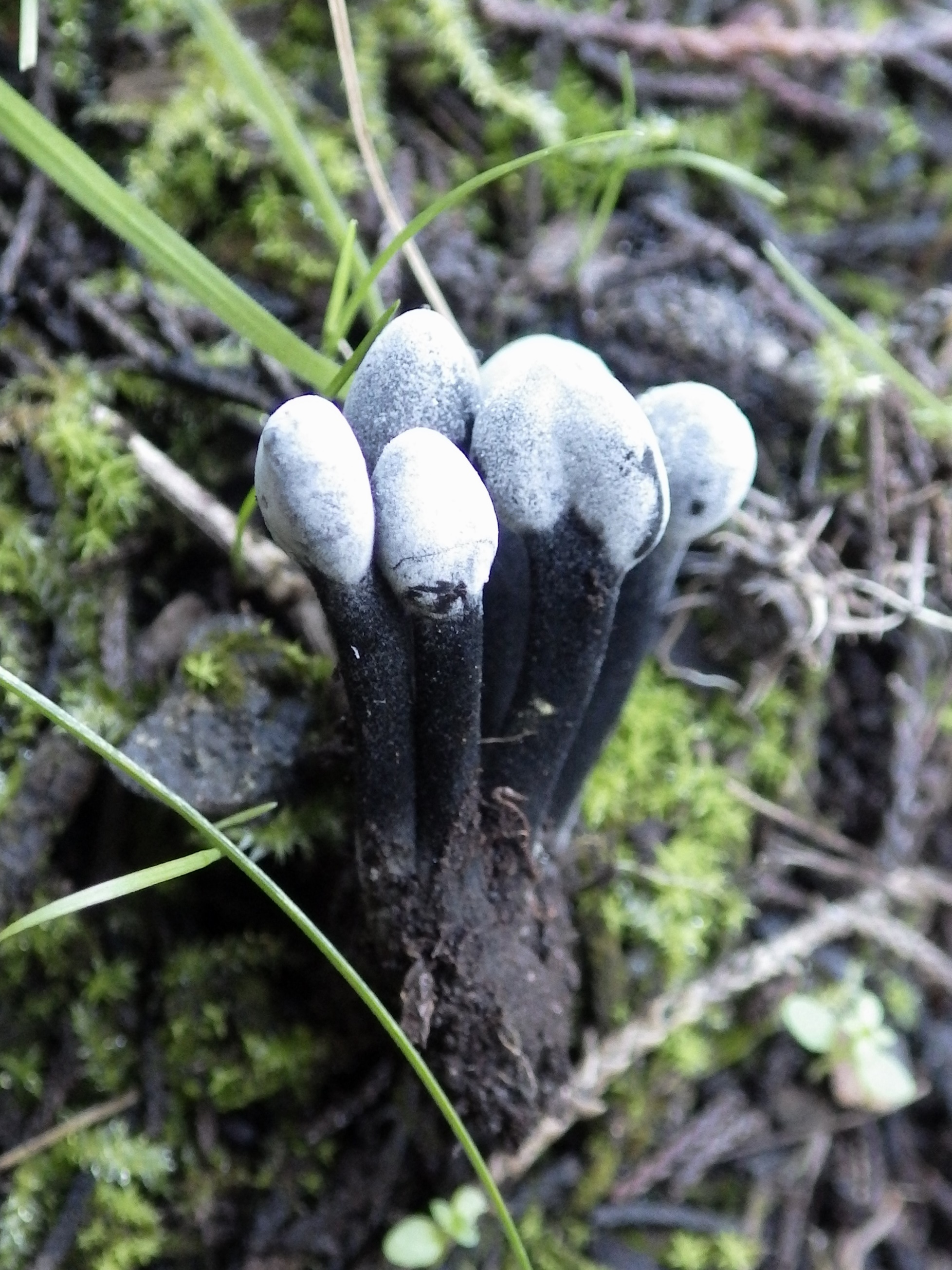
- Hypomyces papulasporae infecting Trichoglossum fruitbodies

Scientific classification
- Domain: Eukaryota
- Kingdom: Fungi
- Division: Ascomycota
- Class: Sordariomycetes
- Order: Hypocreales
- Family: Hypocreaceae
- Genus: Hypomyces
- Species: H. papulasporae

Binomial name
- Hypomyces papulasporae Rogerson & Samuels (1985)

= Hypomyces papulasporae =

Species of fungus

Hypomyces papulasporae is a parasitic ascomycete in the order Hypocreales. It was described as new to science in 1985. The type collection, made in New Zealand, was found growing on the ascomata of Trichoglossum hirsutum (black earth tongues). H. papulasporae has Sibirina- and Papulaspora-like synanamorphs.
