= Glutinoglossum exiguum =

Scientific classification
- Domain: Eukaryota
- Kingdom: Fungi
- Division: Ascomycota
- Class: Geoglossomycetes
- Order: Geoglossales
- Family: Geoglossaceae
- Genus: Glutinoglossum
- Species: G. exiguum

Binomial name
- Glutinoglossum exiguum Hustad & A.N.Mill. (2015)

Species of fungus

Glutinoglossum exiguum is a species of earth tongue fungus that was described as new to science in 2015. It is found in Australia and New Zealand, where it grows on moss in mixed deciduous forests. The fruitbody is morphologically similar to that of Glutinoglossum australasicum, which is usually somewhat larger, more abundant, and has slightly wider and longer ascospores.
