= Nothomitra =

Scientific classification
- Kingdom: Fungi
- Division: Ascomycota
- Class: Geoglossomycetes
- Order: Geoglossales
- Family: Geoglossaceae
- Genus: Nothomitra; Maas Geest. (1964)

Type species
- Nothomitra cinnamomea Maas Geest. (1964)

Species
- N. cinnamomea; N. kovalii; N. sinensis

Genus of fungi

Nothomitra is a genus of fungi in the earth tongue family Geoglossaceae. There is no known common name. Nothomitra is morphologically distinguished from Microglossum in that the fertile hymenium in Nothomitra is not flattened as in Microglossum. Furthermore, the hymenium in Nothomitra is distinctly free at the junction of the stipe, unlike in Microglossum in which the hymenium is flattened and gradually intergrades with the stipe.

== History ==
The genus was first circumscribed by Dutch mycologist Rudolph Arnold Maas Geesteranus from specimens collected in Upper Austria in autumn 1964. Two additional species were later described: Nothomitra kovalii was described by Ain Raitviir in 1971 from Kunashir in the Kuril Islands, and Nothomitra sinensis was described by Zhuang and Wang in 1997 from China. The placement of Nothomitra within the class Geoglossomycetes has been confirmed using molecular phylogenetics.

== Distribution ==
Nothomitra is only known from Europe and China, though extensive distribution data is lacking.

== Conservation ==
The conservation of Nothomitra has not formally been assessed on a global scale. N. cinnamomea and N. sinensis known from few localities in Europe and China, respectively, whereas N. kovalii is only known from its type locality.
