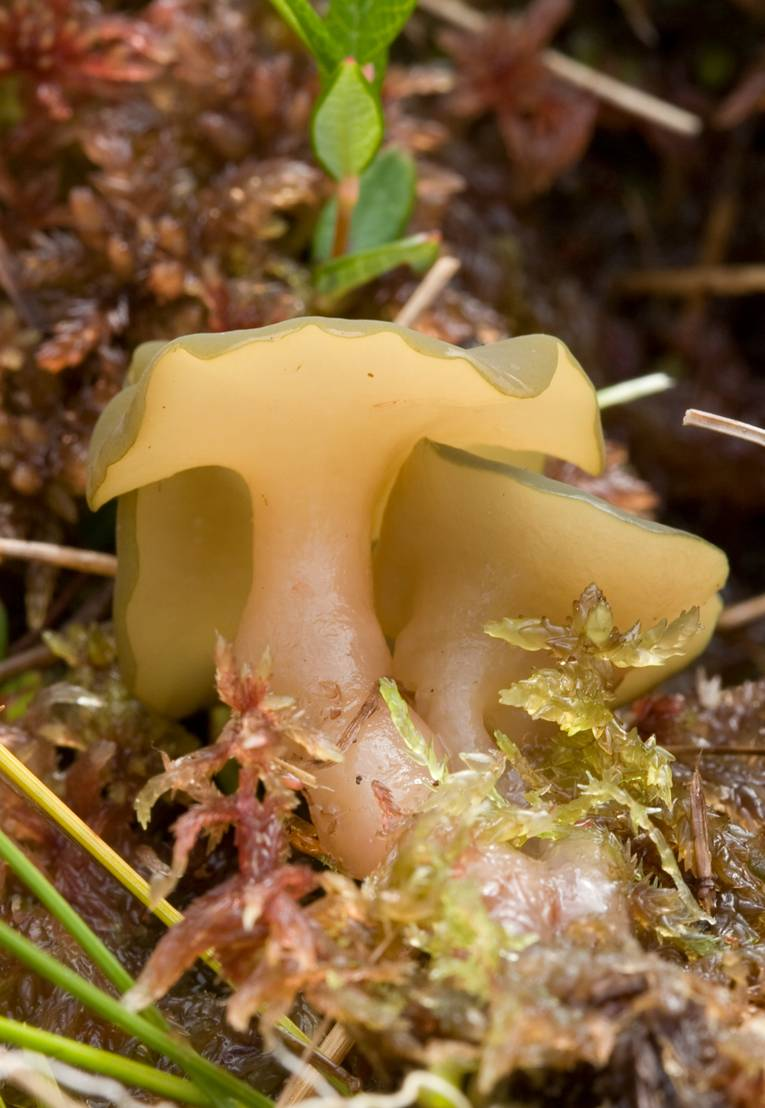
- Sarcoleotia turficola

Scientific classification
- Kingdom: Fungi
- Division: Ascomycota
- Class: Geoglossomycetes
- Order: Geoglossales
- Family: Geoglossaceae
- Genus: Sarcoleotia; S.Ito & S.Imai (1934)

Type species
- Sarcoleotia nigra S.Ito & S.Imai (1934)

Species
- S. globosa S. nigra S. platypus S. turficola

= Sarcoleotia =

Genus of fungi

Sarcoleotia is a genus of fungi in the earth tongue family Geoglossaceae.

== History ==
The genus was first described by Japanese mycologists Seiya Ito and Sanshi Imai in 1934, who separated Sarcoleotia from Leotia Pers. based on the fleshy, non-gelatinous ascocarps and subcylindrical ascospores. Sarcoleotia nigra was described as the type species in the same publication from collections made in Hokkaido, Japan. Maas Geesteranus created S. platypus by transferring Helvella platypus DC. into the genus. Korf transferred Mitrula globosa to the genus in 1971, creating S. globosa. Dennis transferred Coryne turficola to the genus in 1971. Lastly, Rahm reported "Sarcoleotia clandestina" from Switzerland in 1975, but this name is regarded as nomen nudum as no valid description of the species exists.

Some debate exists over the accepted number of species in Sarcoleotia. Maas Geesteranus considered S. nigra a later synonym of S. platypus. Korf transferred S. turficola to the genus Ascocoryne based on gelatinous tissue in the ascocarp. Schumacher and Silvertsen recognized only a single species, S. globosa. Recent molecular evidence indicates that the genus is most closely associated with Geoglossaceae.

== Habitat and distribution ==
Sarcoleotia globosa is reported by Schumacher and Silvertsen as having a "more or less transcontinental northern circumpolar boreo-oroarctic and arctic distribution", citing records from Norway, Sweden, Finland, Iceland, Greenland, Germany, Belgium, the Netherlands, Japan, and Canada. S. globosa has also been reported from Denmark. S. globosa is also reported cool temperate zones ranging from the Pacific Northwestern United States (Washington and Oregon) and Colorado. S. nigra was described from Japan and has been reported from Argentina

S. globosa has been reported from both calcareous areas and rich soil types in Europe, and acidic-nutrient poor soils in North America. S. globosa has been recorded mostly from disturbed areas and primary or secondary successional habitats, almost always fruiting in areas colonized by bryophytes. S. globosa is also reported from burned sites.

== Conservation ==
The conservation of Sarcoleotia has not formally been assessed on a global scale, though given its widespread distribution and ability to survive in varied habitats, it is probably of low concern.
