= Merugia =

Scientific classification
- Kingdom: Fungi
- Division: Ascomycota
- Class: Sordariomycetes
- Order: incertae sedis
- Genus: Merugia; Rogerson & Samuels (1990)

Type species
- Merugia palicoureae Rogerson & Samuels (1990)

Genus of fungi

Merugia is a genus of fungi in the Sordariomycetes class (subclass Sordariomycetidae) of the Ascomycota. The relationship of this taxon to other taxa within the class is unknown (incertae sedis), and it has not yet been placed with certainty into any order or family. This is a monotypic genus, containing the single species Merugia palicoureae, found on the living petioles of Palicourea plants in Guyana. The genus and species were described by mycologists Clark Thomas Rogerson and Gary J. Samuels in 1990.
