= Glutinoglossum americanum =

Scientific classification
- Domain: Eukaryota
- Kingdom: Fungi
- Division: Ascomycota
- Class: Geoglossomycetes
- Order: Geoglossales
- Family: Geoglossaceae
- Genus: Glutinoglossum
- Species: G. americanum

Binomial name
- Glutinoglossum americanum Hustad & A.N.Mill. (2015)

Species of fungus

Glutinoglossum americanum is a species of earth tongue fungus that was described as new to science in 2015. It is found in the United States, where it grows on the ground, often among moss, in mixed deciduous forests.
