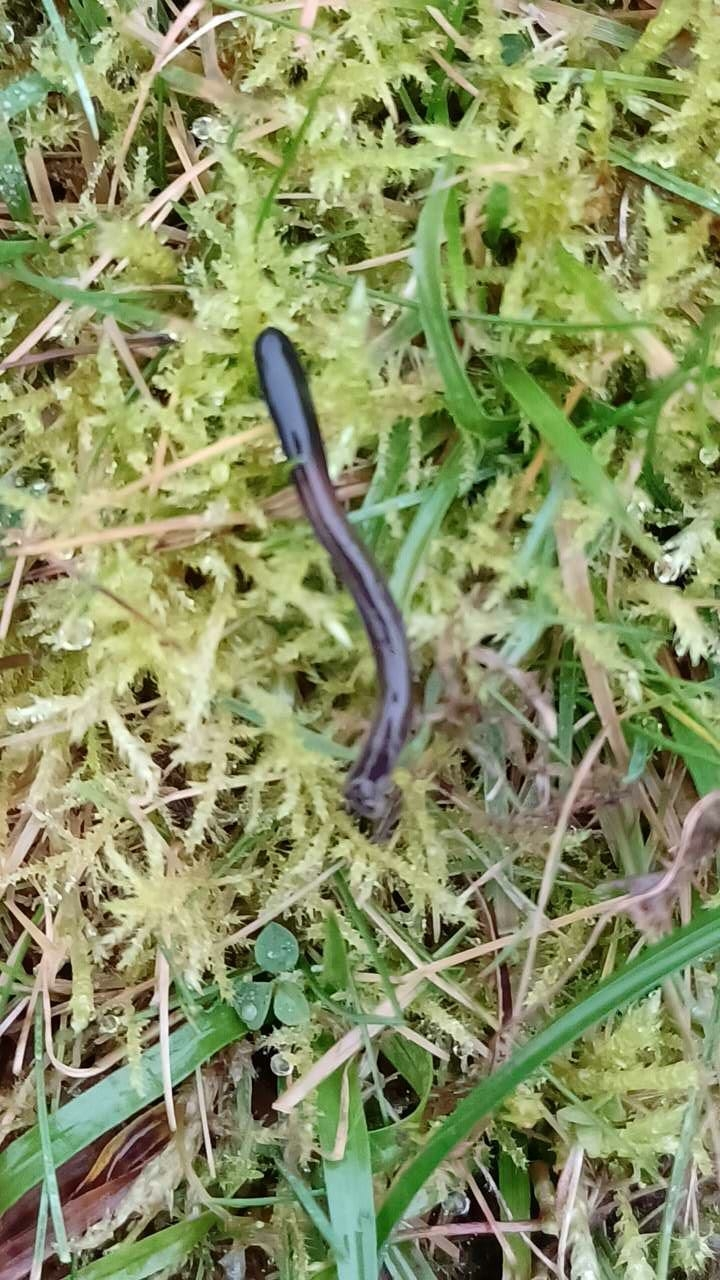

Scientific classification
- Kingdom: Fungi
- Division: Ascomycota
- Class: Geoglossomycetes
- Order: Geoglossales
- Family: Geoglossaceae
- Genus: Glutinoglossum
- Species: G. heptaseptatum

Binomial name
- Glutinoglossum heptaseptatum Hustad, A.N.Mill., Dentinger & P.F.Cannon (2013)

= Glutinoglossum heptaseptatum =

Species of fungus

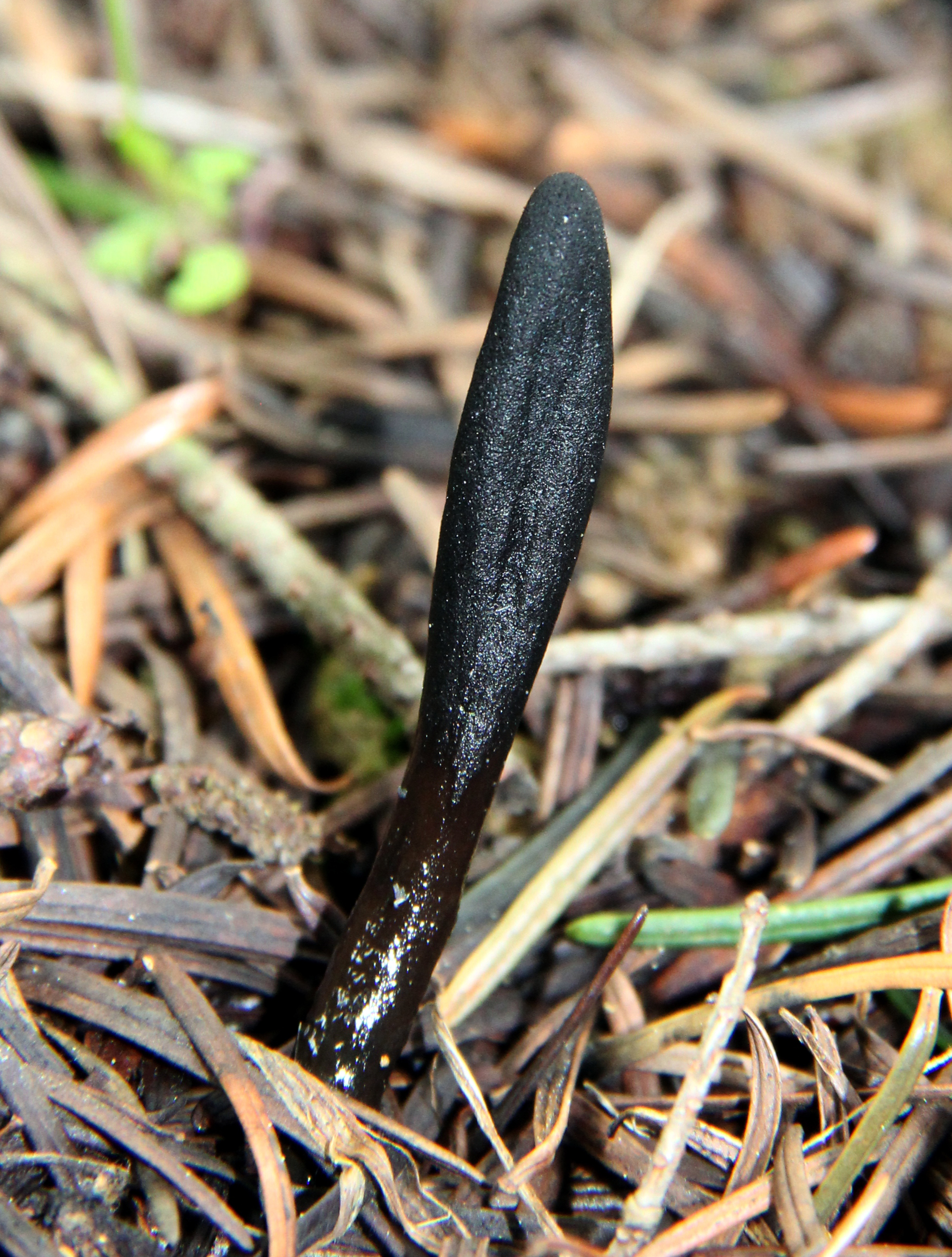
Glutinoglossum glutinosum, from which G. heptaseptatum is indistinguishable without attention to microscopic features.

Glutinoglossum heptaseptatum is a species of earth tongue fungus in the family Geoglossaceae. Described in 2013, it is indistinguishable from its close relative G. glutinosum without the use of a microscope, and is known for certain only from the Czech Republic.

== Taxonomy ==
Glutinoglossum heptaseptatum was described in 2013 in a paper by mycologists V. P. Hustad, A. N. Miller, T. M. Dentinger and P. F. Cannon published in Persoonia. It was placed in the newly described genus Glutinoglossum. The genus was created for G. heptaseptatum and G. glutinosum, which were found to comprise one of five distinct clades within the Geoglossaceae. The species have an 8–10% DNA sequence dissimilarity in their internal transcribed spacer regions. The specific name heptaseptatum refers to how the ascospores of the species typically have seven septa.

== Description ==
Macroscopically, Glutinoglossum heptaseptatum is identical to G. glutinosum. It can be distinguished by microscopic characteristics, as it features wider asci, measuring from 170 to 205 by 18 to 22 micrometres (μm), and ascospores measuring from 55 to 90 μm, which usually have seven septa.

== Habitat and distribution ==
Glutinoglossum heptaseptatum grows from the earth in damp habitats. The species is known for certain from one location in the Hradec Králové Region of the Czech Republic, near Liberec. The field also contained mosses, Festuca rubra, Agrostis capillaris and Cirsium palustre. Reports of similar specimens in the literature suggest that the species may also exist in Asia, North America and Australia, but the very wide distribution may instead suggest additional as-yet undescribed taxa.
