= Glutinoglossum methvenii =

Scientific classification
- Domain: Eukaryota
- Kingdom: Fungi
- Division: Ascomycota
- Class: Geoglossomycetes
- Order: Geoglossales
- Family: Geoglossaceae
- Genus: Glutinoglossum
- Species: G. methvenii

Binomial name
- Glutinoglossum methvenii Hustad & A.N.Mill. (2015)

Species of fungus

Glutinoglossum methvenii is a species of earth tongue fungus that was described as new to science in 2015. It is found in Australia and New Zealand, where it grows on moss and decaying logs in mixed deciduous forests. The specific epithet honours mycologist Andrew Methven.
