= Clark Thomas Rogerson =

American mycologist (1918–2001)

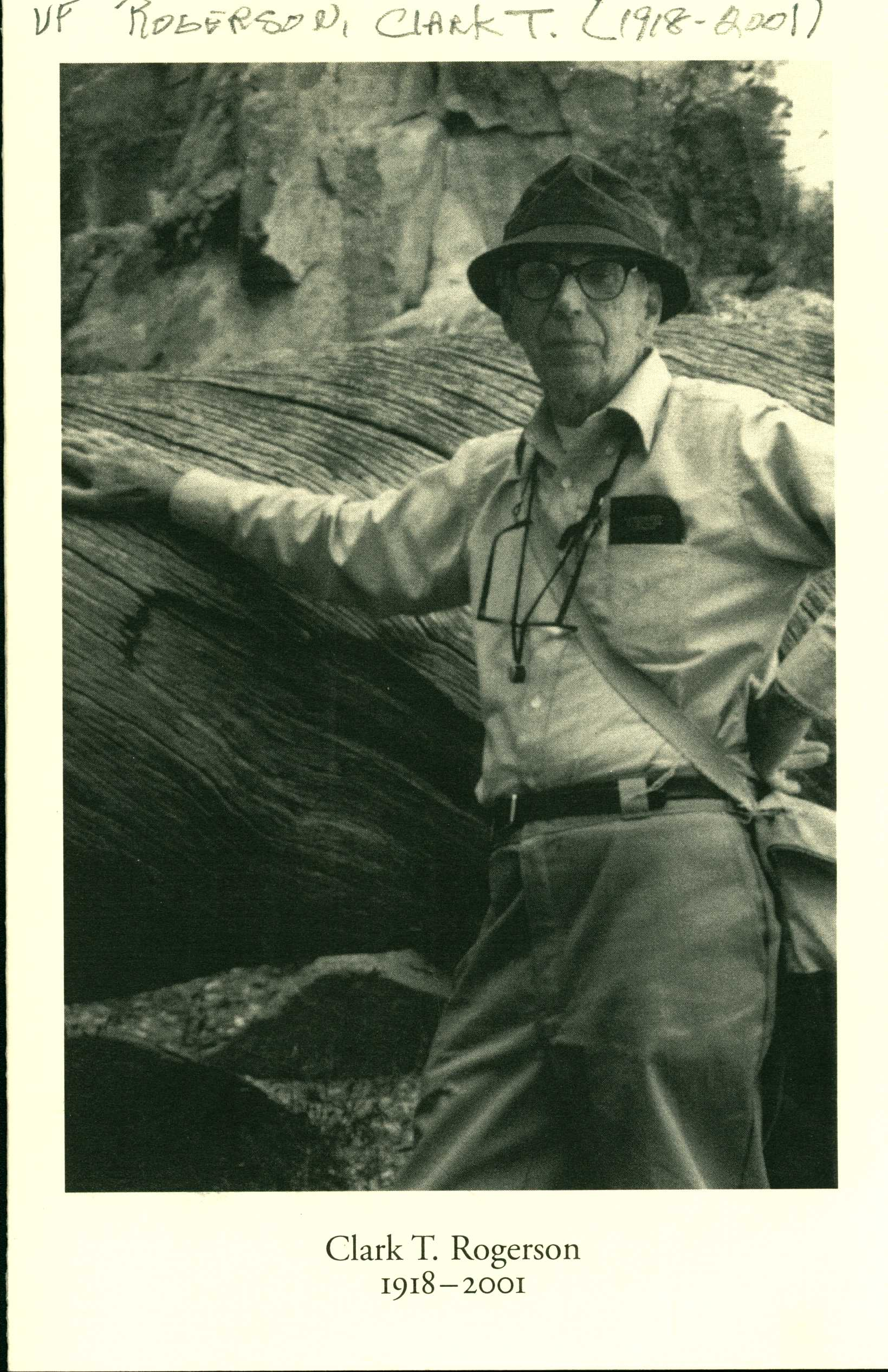
- Rogerson in 1989
- Born: October 2, 1918; Ogden, Utah, US
- Died: September 7, 2001 (aged 82); Ogden, Utah, US
- Education: Cornell University
- Known for: Taxonomy of the Hypocreales
- Scientific career
- Fields: Mycology
- Doctoral advisor: Harry Morton Fitzpatrick
- Author abbrev. (botany): Rogerson

Clark Thomas Rogerson (2 October 1918 – 7 September 2001) was an American mycologist. He was known for his work in the Hypocreales (Ascomycota), particularly Hypomyces, a genus of fungi that parasitize other fungi. After receiving his doctorate from Cornell University in 1950, he went on to join the faculty of Kansas State University. In 1958, he became a curator at The New York Botanical Garden, and served as editor for various academic journals published by the Garden. Rogerson was involved with the Mycological Society of America, serving in various positions, including president in 1969. He was managing editor (1958–89) and editor-in-chief (1960–65) of the scientific journal Mycologia.

== Biography ==
C.T. Rogerson was born on October 2, 1918, in Ogden, Utah. Upon graduating from high school in 1936, he enrolled in Weber Junior College (since renamed to Weber State University) for the following two years. Rogerson then attended Utah State University, where he had hoped to work under the supervision of botanist Bassett Maguire, but settled instead for the only available studentship with plant pathologist B.L. Richards. Rogerson received his Bachelor of Science from Utah State University in 1940. Soon after, he was drafted into the army, and spent three years (1942–1945) in the Pacific Theater of World War II. He served as a technical sergeant in laboratory and pharmacy at an army evacuation hospital, and cared for internees released in the Philippines near the war's end. During his war years, Rogerson made collections of plants, fungi, slime molds, and butterflies that he sent to Cornell or to the Smithsonian Institution.

After the war finished, Rogerson continued studying fungal systematics and started a doctoral program with Harry Morton Fitzpatrick at Cornell University; noted mycologist Richard P. Korf was another of Fitzpatrick's graduate students at the time. Under Fitzpatrick, Rogerson studied Hypomyces fungi and their anamorphs. Fitzpatrick committed suicide in 1950, and Donald S. Welch replaced him as Rogerson's advisor for the last few months of his doctoral program. Rogerson received his doctorate from Cornell in 1950. That year, he joined the faculty of Kansas State University as an assistant professor, but he would ultimately advance to associate professor. While at Kansas, he worked on the identification of fungi, and published nearly 20 papers on fungal taxonomic novelties, aeromycology (the fungal flora of air), and plant diseases caused by fungi.

In 1958, the director of The New York Botanical Garden, William Jacob Robbins, recruited Rogerson for the position of Curator of Cryptogamic Botany. Rogerson became Senior Curator in 1967 and Senior Curator Emeritus at his retirement in 1990. As curator of cryptogamic botany, Rogerson "was directly responsible for all accessions and loans of ferns and mosses, as well as of fungi and lichens, until about 1965 when, first a bryologist and later a pteridologist were added to the cryptogamic staff." At the Garden, he also continued his study on the taxonomy of the Ascomycetes, especially of Hypomyces, a genus of fungi that parasitize other fungi, and the fungal diversity of New York and Utah. Additionally, he served as editor of the Garden's publications: Memoirs of the New York Botanical Garden (1963–88), North American Flora (1963–88), and Flora Neotropica (1969–83). While at the Garden, Rogerson was also an adjunct professor of biology at Columbia University and at the Herbert H. Lehman College of the City University of New York.

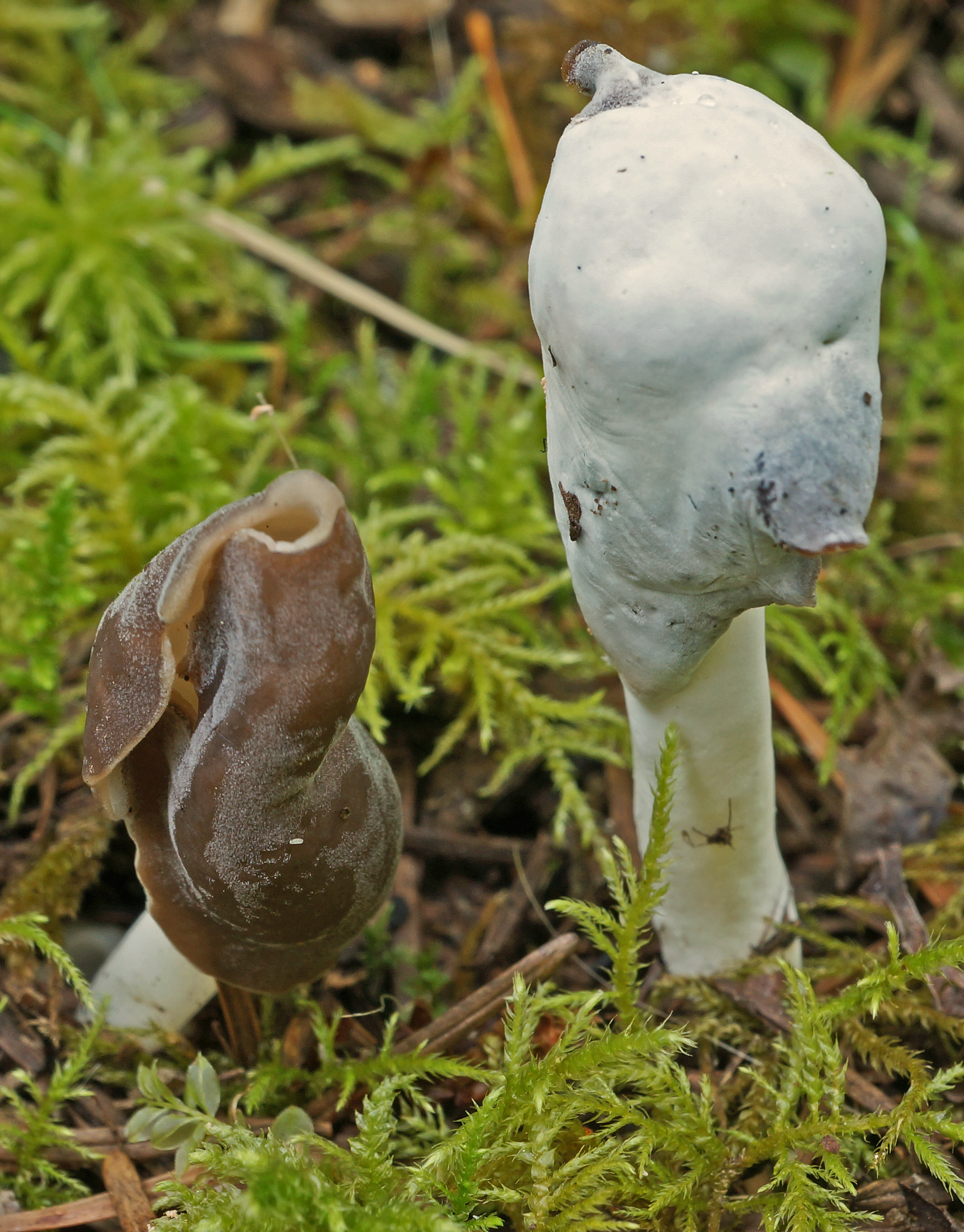
Hypomyces cervinigenus (shown infecting the Helvella fruit body on the right) is one of several species formally described by Rogerson.

During his tenure at the Garden, Rogerson was also a deeply involved member of the Mycological Society of America (MSA). He served as managing editor (1958–89) and editor-in-chief (1960–65) of the scientific journal Mycologia. He was vice-president (1967), president elect (1968), and president of the MSA (1969), and secretary-treasurer of the society from 1973 to 1974. He has served as historian of the Mycological Society of America from 1960 to 1990. Rogerson was a generous donor to MSA student travel awards. He died in Ogden on September 7, 2001.

== Mycological contributions ==
Rogerson added many thousands of records of fungi, mainly from Utah, to the Garden herbarium, where his specimens are available for study by systematists. Rogerson assisted in the formation of the three major amateur mushroom groups in the New York City area: the New York Mycological Association, the New Jersey Mycological Association, and the Connecticut-Westchester Mycological Association (COMA). He helped amateur mycologists correctly identify fungal specimens during his weekends. "In return, amateur mycologists provided him with many specimens of fungicolous Hypomyces." In 1994 he started to issue an exsiccata, namely Fungi Boreali-Americani with Stanley Jay Smith and John H. Haines as co-editors.

In 1970, Rogerson presented a detailed history of the Hypocreales and reviewed changes in the circumscription of the order up to that time. His publication included keys to the genera of both the Hypocreales and Clavicipitales, followed by a list of genera, each with the literature citation of the original descriptions and type species. He included 115 genera in the Hypocreales.

=== Taxa described ===
- Cladobotryum arnoldii Rogerson & Samuels 1993
- Cladobotryum hughesii Rogerson & Samuels 1993
- Cladobotryum succineum Rogerson & Samuels 1992
- Cylindrosporium campicola Rogerson & R. Sprague 1959
- Hypocrea avellanea Rogerson & S.T. Carey 1976
- Hypomyces amaurodermatis Rogerson & Samuels 1993
- Hypomyces badius Rogerson & Samuels 1989
- Hypomyces boletiphagus Rogerson & Samuels 1989
- Hypomyces cervinigenus Rogerson & Simms 1971
- Hypomyces chlorinigenus Rogerson & Samuels 1989
- Hypomyces lanceolatus Rogerson & Samuels 1993
- Hypomyces leotiicola Rogerson & Samuels 1985
- Hypomyces melanocarpus Rogerson & Mazzer 1971
- Hypomyces melanochlorus Rogerson & Samuels 1989
- Hypomyces microspermus Rogerson & Samuels 1989
- Hypomyces mycogones Rogerson & Samuels 1985
- Hypomyces mycophilus Rogerson & Samuels 1993
- Hypomyces papulasporae Rogerson & Samuels 1985
- Hypomyces papulasporae var. americanus Rogerson & Samuels 1985
- Hypomyces pergamenus Rogerson & Samuels 1993
- Hypomyces porphyreus Rogerson & Mazzer 1971
- Hypomyces pseudopolyporinus Rogerson & Samuels 1986
- Hypomyces stephanomatis Rogerson & Samuels 1985
- Hypomyces succineus Rogerson & Samuels 1992
- Hypomyces sympodiophorus Rogerson & Samuels 1993
- Merugia Rogerson & Samuels 1990
- Merugia palicoureae Rogerson & Samuels 1990
- Nectria albidopilosa Rogerson & Samuels 1985
- Nectria discicola Rogerson & Samuels 1985
- Nectria discophila Rogerson & Samuels 1985
- Nectria phialotrichi Rogerson & Samuels 1992
- Podostroma eperuae Rogerson & Samuels 1992
- Sympodiophora polyporicola Rogerson & S.T. Carey 1981

== Mycological lineage ==
Clark T. Rogerson belongs to the Dudley mycological lineage, which can be traced back to Anton De Bary, a famous German mycologist. William Russell Dudley was Assistant Professor of Cryptogamic Botany at Cornell University from 1883 to 1892, and received mycological training from De Bary in 1887. Joseph Charles Arthur, George Francis Atkinson, and Mason B. Thomas studied under Dudley. Thomas went to Wabash College, where he would influence Harry Morton Fitzpatrick to study mycology. Fitzpatrick received his Ph.D. in 1913 at Cornell under tutelage of Atkinson. Rogerson studied under Fitzpatrick at Cornell from 1946 to 1950. Contemporary to Rogerson was fellow student Richard P. Korf, another prominent mycologist. Students of Rogerson include Robert L. Shaffer (Kansas State; M.A.), Susan Carey Canham (Columbia University; Ph.D.), Anna F. Doyle (Columbia University; Ph.D.), Gary J. Samuels (Columbia University; Ph.D.), and Rosalind Lowen (Lehman College; Ph.D.). Katia F. Rodrigues and Priscila Chaverri (Penn State; Ph.D.) studied under Samuels. The Rogerson sublineage continues to expand under Chaverri at the University of Maryland.

== Honors and memberships ==
Rogerson received several awards and honors during his career:

- 1969: President of the Mycological Society of America
- 1980: North American Mycological Association (NAMA) award for contributions to amateur mycology
- 1981: Award from the Mycological Society of America in appreciation for service to the Society as Historian, Secretary-Treasurer, Vice-President, and President and as Managing Editor and Editor-in-Chief of Mycologia
- 1981: The Connecticut-Westchester Mycological Association (COMA) named their annual four-day mushroom foray after C.T. Rogerson in appreciation of his commitment to education and the development of amateur mycology.
- 1984: New York Botanical Garden Distinguished Service Award for outstanding contribution to the advancement of Horticulture and Botany
- 1985: COMAndation for outstanding service to COMA
- 1989: A commemorative publication celebrating the 70th birthday of C.T. Rogerson (Memoirs of the New York Botanical Garden 49: 1–375).
- 2004: The Mycological Society of America established the Clark T. Rogerson student research and travel award.

Rogerson was a member of the American Association for the Advancement of Science, the Bergen Swamp Preservation Society, and the Utah Academy of Sciences.

=== Eponymous taxa ===
- Rogersonanthus B.Maguire & B.M.Boom (1989)
- Rogersonia Samuels & Lodge (1996) - genus of fungi
- Clonostachys rogersoniana Schroers (2001)
- Golovinomyces rogersonii U.Braun (1996)
- Pseudocercospora rogersoniana U.Braun & Crous
- Pseudocosmospora rogersonii C. Herrera & P. Chaverri
- Trichoderma rogersonii Samuels (2006)
- Zelleromyces rogersonii Fogel & States (2001)

== Publications ==
Rogerson wrote 65 research publications and several bibliographic publications.

- 1950. Rogerson CT, Muenscher WC. "The vegetation of Bergen Swamp VI. The fungi." Proc Rochester Acad Sci 9:277–314.
- 1951. King C, Rogerson CT. "Tomato late blight in Kansas". Plant Dis Rep 35:120.
- 1952. Rogerson CT, Shaffer RL. "Underwoodia in Kansas". Mycologia 44:582.
- 1952. Shaffer RL, Rogerson CT. "Notes on the fleshy fungi of Kansas". Trans Kansas Acad Sci 55:282–286.
- 1952. Walker EA, Rogerson CT, Jenkins AE. "Additional collections of plantain scab and violet scab from several North Central states". Plant Dis Rep 36: 331–332.
- 1953. Elmer OM, Shields IJ, Rogerson CT. "Oak wilt in seven Kansas counties". Plant Dis Rep 37:44.
- 1953. Rogerson CT. "Kansas mycological notes: 1951". Trans Kansas Acad 56:53–57.
- 1954. Rogerson CT, King CL. "Stem rust of Merion bluegrass in Kansas". Pl Dis Reporter 38:57.
- 1954. Rogerson CT. "Kansas mycological notes: 1952". Trans Kansas Acad 57:280–284.
- 1954. Slagg CM, Rogerson CT. "A tuckahoe found in Kansas". Trans Kansas Acad 57:66–68.
- 1956. Rogerson CT. "Kansas mycological notes: 1953–54". Trans Kansas Acad 59:39–48.
- 1957. Pady SM, Johnston CO, Rogerson CT. "Stipe rust of wheat in Kansas in 1957". Plant Dis Rep 41: 959–961.
- 1957. Rogerson CT. "Diseases of grasses in Kansas: 1953–55". Plant Dis Rep 40:388–397.
- 1957. ———. "Verticillium-wilt in Kansas". Plant Dis Rep 41:1053–1054.
- 1958. ———. "Diseases of grasses in Kansas: 1956–1957". Plant Dis Rep 42:346–353.
- 1958. ———. "Kansas aeromycology I. Comparison of media". Trans Kansas Acad 61:155–162.
- 1958. ———. "Kansas mycological notes: 1955–1956". Trans Kansas Acad 60:370–375.
- 1958. ———. "Kansas mycological notes: 1957". Trans Kansas Acad 61:262–272.
- 1958. Sprague R, Rogerson CT. "Some leafspot fungi on Kansas Gramineae". Mycologia 50:634–641.
- 1959. CL, Pady SM, Rogerson CT, Ouye L. "Kansas aeromycology II. Materials, methods, and general results". Trans Kansas Acad 62:184–199.
- 1959. Kramer CL, Pady SM, Rogerson CT. "Kansas aeromycology III. Cladosporium". Trans Kansas Acad 62:200–207.
- 1959. Luttrell ES, Rogerson CT. "Homothallism in an undescribed Cochliobolus and in Cochliobolus kusanoi". Mycologia 51:195–202.
- 1959. Willis WW, Rogerson CT, Carpenter WJ. "An evaluation of several fungicides for control of root rot of croft lilies". Plant Dis Rep 43:745–749.
- 1960. Hall CV, Dutta SK, Kalia HR, Rogerson CT. "Inheritance of resistance to the fungus Colletotrichum lagenarium in watermelons". Proc Am Soc Hort Sci 15:638–643.
- 1960. Kramer CL, Pady SM, Rogerson CT. "Kansas aeromycology IV. Alternaria". Trans Kansas Acad 62: 252–256.
- 1960. ———, ———, ———. "Kansas aeromycology V: Penicillium and Aspergillus". Mycologia 52:545–555.
- 1960. ———, ———, ———. "Kansas aeromycology VIII: Phycomycetes". Trans Kansas Acad 63:19–23.
- 1962. Anchel M, Silverman WB, Valanju N, Rogerson CT. "Patterns of polyacetylene production I. The diatretynes". Mycologia 54:249–257.
- 1962. Rogerson CT. "Coral mushrooms". Gard Journal New York Botanical Garden 12:52–54.
- 1962. Swarup G, Hansing ED, Rogerson CT. "Fungi associated with sorghum seed in Kansas". Trans Kansas Acad 65:120–137.
- 1965. Rogerson CT. "Bibliography". In: Munz PA, Onagraceae (ed.). N Am Flora II 5:232–265.
- 1965. ———. "Bibliography". In: Yuncker TG, Cuscuta (ed.). N Am Flora II 4:41–48.
- 1965. ———. "Stinkhorn fungi". Gard Journal New York Botanical Garden 15:214–215.
- 1966. ———. "Dedication and preface" In: Mycologia index volumes 1–58, 1909–1966. The New York Botanical Garden: New York. Pp. vii–xv.
- 1967. Kramer CL, Haard RT, Rogerson CT. "Kansas mycological notes, 1955–1964". Trans Kansas Acad 70:241–255.
- 1968. Rogerson CT. Preface. In: Mycologia index, volumes 1–58, 1909–1966. ix–xv. New York: The New York Botanical Garden.
- 1969. ———. "The cryptogamic herbarium. Algae and fungi". Gard Journal New York Botanical Garden 19:14–19.
- 1970. Hodges CS Jr, Warner GM, Rogerson CT. "A new species of Penicillium". Mycologia 62:1106–1111.
- 1970. Rogerson CT. "The Hypocrealean fungi (Ascomycetes-Hypocreales)". Mycologia 62:865–910.
- 1971. ———, Mazzer SJ. "Two new species of Hypomyces from Michigan". Michigan Bot 10:107–113.
- 1971. ———, Simms HR. "A new species of Hypomyces on Helvella". Mycologia 63:416–422.
- 1973. ———. "Fred Jay Seaver, 1877–1970". Mycologia 65:721–724.
- 1973. ———. "New names and new taxa of fungi proposed by Fred Jay Seaver (1877–1970). 1–42". Unpublished manuscript. The New York Botanical Garden.
- 1973. ———. "Publications of Fred Jay Seaver, 1877–1970. 1–21". Unpublished manuscript, The New York Botanical Garden.
- 1976 [5 Jan 1977]. Carey ST, Rogerson CT. "Taxonomy and morphology of a new species of Hypocrea on Marasmius". Brittonia 28:381–389.
- 1976. Rogerson CT, ed. "Commemorating the 70th Birthday of Dr. Josiah L. Lowe". Mem New York Bot Gard 28:24.
- 1977. Hervey A, Rogerson CT, Leong I. "Studies of fungi cultivated by ants". Brittonia 29:226–236.
- 1977. Malloch D, Rogerson CT. "Pulveria, a new genus of Xylariaceae (Ascomycetes)". Can J Bot 55:1505–1509.
- 1978. ———, ———. "Fungi of the Canadian boreal forest region: Catulus aquilonius gen. et sp. nov., a hyperparasite on Seuratia millardetii". Can J Bot 56: 2344–2347.
- 1978. Rogerson CT. "Bibliography and index (Compositae tribe Mutisiae, tribe Senecioneae, tribe Vernoniaea)". N Am Flora II, 10:203–245.
- 1981. Berthier J, Rogerson CT. "A new North American species: Physalacria cryptomeriae". Mycologia 73: 643–648.
- 1981. Carey ST, Rogerson CT. "Morphology and cytology of Hypomyces polyporinus and its Sympodiophora anamorph". Bull Torrey Bot Club 108:12–24.
- 1981. Rossman AY, Rogerson CT. "A new species of Hypomyces (Hypocreaceae) with phragmosporous ascospores". Brittonia 33:382–384.
- 1983. Barr ME, Rogerson CT. "Two new species of Loculoascomycetes". Mycotaxon 17:247–252.
- 1983. Carey ST, Rogerson CT. "Arnoldiomyces clavisporus, the anamorph of Hypomyces polyporinus". Bull Torrey Club 110:224–225.
- 1983. Nair MSR, Carey ST, Rogerson CT. "Illudoids from Omphalotus olivascens and Clitocybe subilludens". Mycologia 75:920–922.
- 1984 [May 1986]. Samuels GJ, Rogerson CT. "New ascomycetes from Amazonas". Acta Amazonica 14(1/2 Suppl.):81–93.
- 1984. Buck WR, Rogerson CT. "Bibliography. Sphagnopsida, Sphagnaceae". N Am Flora II 11:161–175.
- 1984. Rogerson CT, Thiers BM. "Fungi from the A.O. Garrett Herbarium, University of Utah (UT)". Brittonia 36:293–296.
- 1984. Samuels GJ, Rogerson CT, Rossman AY, Smith JD. "Nectria tuberculariformis, Nectriella muelleri, Nectriella sp., and Hyponectria sceptri: low-temperature tolerant, alpine-boreal fungal antagonists". Can J Bot 62:1896–1903.
- 1984. ———, ———. "Nectria atrofusca and its anamorph, Fusarium staphyeae, a parasite of Staphylea trifolia in Eastern North America". Brittonia 36:81–895.
- 1985. Illman WI, Rogerson CT, White GP. "Disposition of Stilbum rhizomorpharum under Pseudographiella". Mycologia 77:662–665.
- 1985. Rogerson CT, Samuels GJ. "Species of Hypomyces and Nectria occurring on discomycetes". Mycologia 77:763–783.
- 1986. Barr ME, Rogerson CT, Smith SJ, Haines JH. "An annotated catalog of the pyrenomycetes described by Charles H. Peck". Bull New York State Mus Nat Hist 459:1–74.
- 1986. Rogerson CT. "[Review of] Microfungi on land plants. An identification handbook, by Martin B. Ellis and J. Pamela Ellis". Bull Torrey Club 113:61.
- 1988. Samuels GJ, Barr ME, Rogerson CT. "Xenomeris saccifolii and Gibbera sphyrospermi, new tropical species of the Venturiaceae (Fungi, Pleosporales)". Brittonia 40:392–397.
- 1989. Rogerson CT, Samuels GJ. "Boleticolous species of Hypomyces". Mycologia 81:413–432.
- 1989. ———, ———. "Polyporicolous species of Hypomyces". Mycologia 85:231–272.
- 1989. Samuels GJ, Rogerson CT. "Endocreas lasiacidis and Sinosphaeria lasiacidis, new tropical ascomycetes". Stud Mycol 31:145–149.
- 1990. Rogerson CT, Harris RC, Samuels GJ. "Fungi collected by Bassett Maguire and Collaborators in the Guayana Highland, 1944–1983". Mem New York Bot Gard 64:130–164.
- 1990. Samuels GJ, Doi Y, Rogerson CT. "Hypocreales". Mem New York Bot Gard 59:6–108.
- 1990. ———, Rogerson CT. "Some Ascomycetes (Fungi) occurring on tropical ferns". Brittonia 42:105–115.
- 1990. ———, Rogerson CT. "New Ascomycetes from the Guayana Highland". Mem New York Bot Gard 64:165–183.
- 1991. ———, Rossman AY, Lowen R, Rogerson CT. "A synopsis of Nectria subgen. Dialonectria". Mycol Pap 164:1–48.
- 1992. Rogerson CT, Samuels GJ. "New species of Hypocreales (Fungi, Ascomycetes)". Brittonia 44:256–263. doi:10.2307/2806843
- 1993. ———, Stephenson SL. "Myxomyceticolous fungi". Mycologia 85:456–469.
- 1994. ———, Samuels GJ. "Agaricolous species of Hypomyces". Mycologia 86:839–866.
- 1995. Braun U, Rogerson CT. "Phytoparasitic hyphomycetes from Utah (USA)—II". Sydowia 47:141–145.
- 1995. ———, Rogerson CT. "Phytoparasitic Hyphomycetes from Utah (USA)". Mycotaxon 46:263–274.
- 1996. Rogerson CT, Samuels GJ. "Mycology at The New York Botanical Garden (1895–1995)". Brittonia 48:389–398. doi:10.1007/BF02805308
- 1999. Barr ME, Rogerson CT. "Some loculoascomycete species from the Great Basin, USA". Mycotaxon 71:473–480.
- 1999. Rossman, Samuels GJ, Rogerson CT, Lowen R. "Genera of Bionectriaceae, Hypocreaceae, and Nectriaceae (Hypocreales, Ascomycetes)". Stud Mycol 42:1–248.
