= Rogersonanthus =

Scientific classification
- Kingdom: Plantae
- Clade: Tracheophytes
- Clade: Angiosperms
- Clade: Eudicots
- Clade: Asterids
- Order: Gentianales
- Family: Gentianaceae
- Genus: Rogersonanthus; Maguire & B.M.Boom

Genus of plants

Rogersonanthus is a genus of flowering plants belonging to the family Gentianaceae.

Its native range is Guyana, Trinidad and Tobago and Venezuela in northern South America.

The genus name of Rogersonanthus is in honour of Clark Thomas Rogerson (1918–2001), an American mycologist. It was first described and published in Mem. New York Bot. Gard. Vol.51 on page 3 in 1989.

Known species, according to Kew:

- Rogersonanthus arboreus (Britton) Maguire & B.M.Boom
- Rogersonanthus quelchii (N.E.Br.) Maguire & B.M.Boom
