= Glutinoglossum australasicum =

Scientific classification
- Domain: Eukaryota
- Kingdom: Fungi
- Division: Ascomycota
- Class: Geoglossomycetes
- Order: Geoglossales
- Family: Geoglossaceae
- Genus: Glutinoglossum
- Species: G. australasicum

Binomial name
- Glutinoglossum australasicum Hustad & A.N.Mill. (2015)

Species of fungus

Glutinoglossum australasicum is a species of earth tongue fungus that was described as new to science in 2015. It is found in Australia and New Zealand, where it grows singly or in groups on the ground and in rich humus.
