= Paraphyses =

Filamentary support structures in some plants and fungi

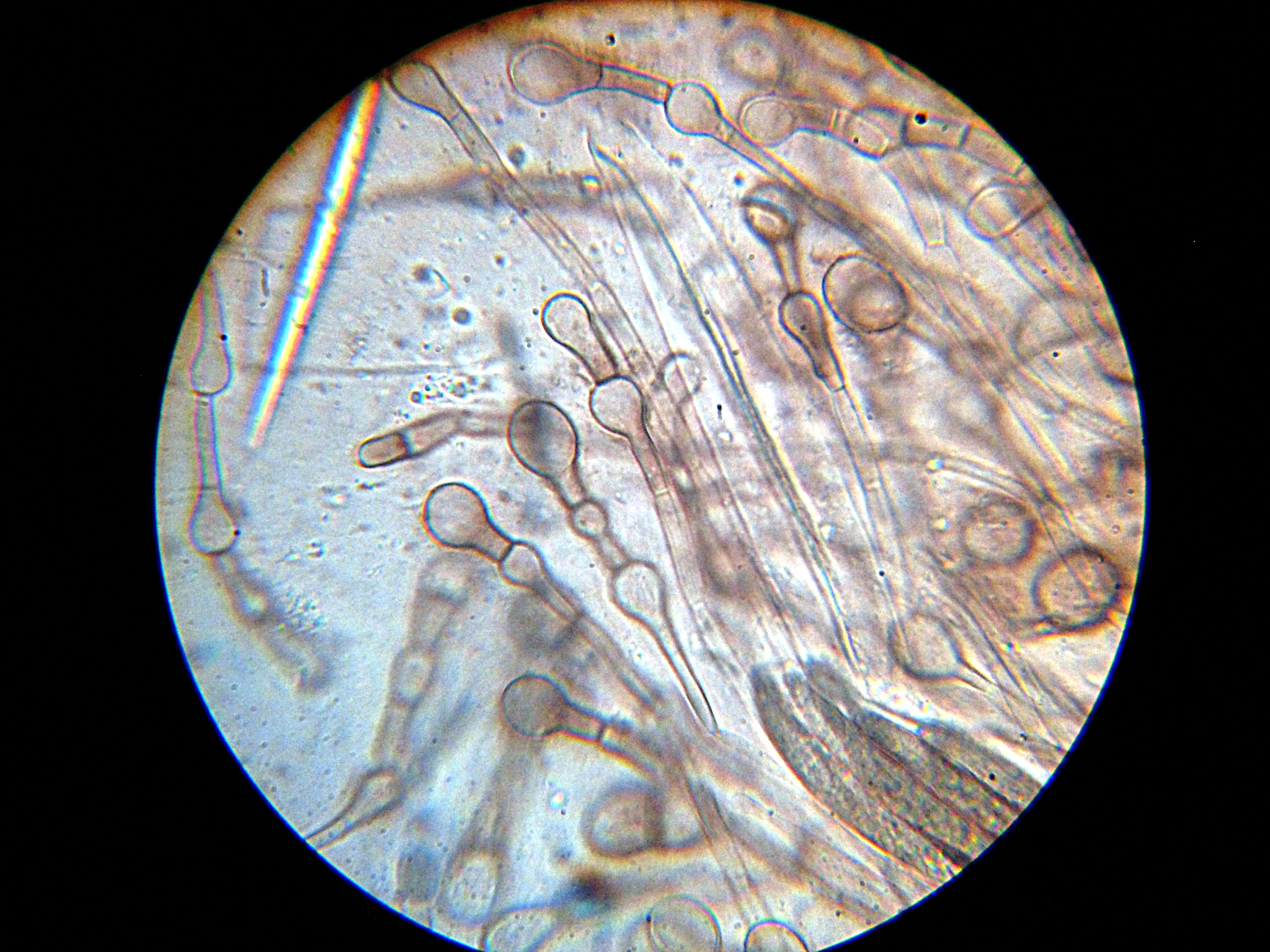
Paraphyses of the fungal species Glutinoglossum glutinosum as seen under a light microscope.

Paraphyses are erect sterile filament-like support structures occurring among the reproductive apparatuses of fungi, ferns, bryophytes and some thallophytes. The singular form of the word is paraphysis.

In certain fungi, they are part of the fertile spore-bearing layer. More specifically, paraphyses are sterile filamentous hyphal end cells composing part of the hymenium of Ascomycota and Basidiomycota interspersed among either the asci or basidia respectively, and not sufficiently differentiated to be called cystidia, which are specialized, swollen, often protruding cells. The tips of paraphyses may contain the pigments which colour the hymenium.

In ferns and mosses, they are filament-like structures that are found on sporangia. They are found between clusters of archegonia and antheridia.
