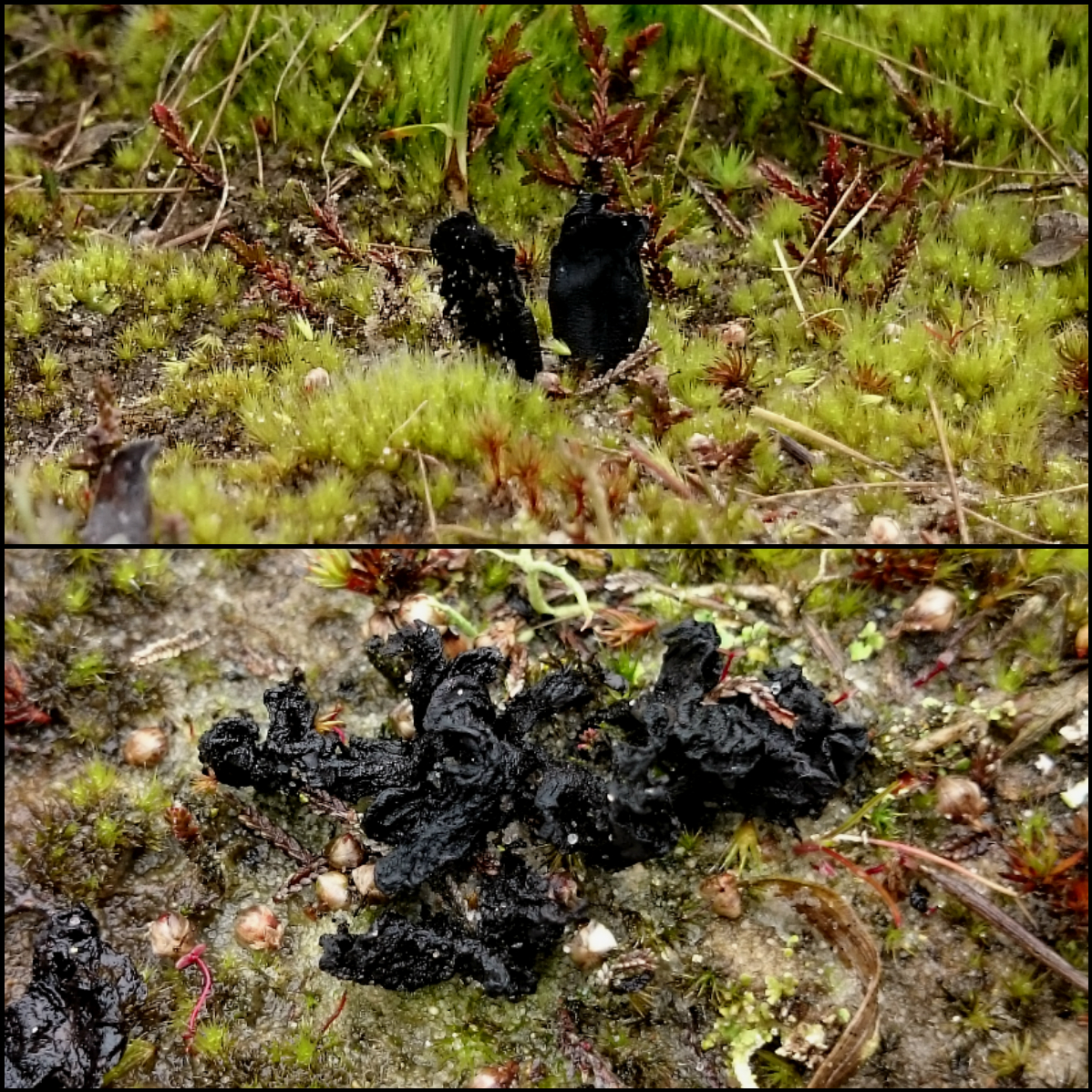
- Sabuloglossum arenarium in the Netherlands

Scientific classification
- Kingdom: Fungi
- Division: Ascomycota
- Class: Geoglossomycetes
- Order: Geoglossales
- Family: Geoglossaceae
- Genus: Sabuloglossum; Hustad, A.N.Mill, Dentinger & P.F.Cannon (2013)

Type species
- Sabuloglossum arenarium (Rostr.) Hustad, A.N.Mill., Dentinger & P.F.Cannon (2012)

Synonyms
- Microglossum arenarium Rostr. (1892); Corynetes arenarius (Rostr.) E.J.Durand (1908); Geoglossum arenarium (Rostr.) Lloyd (1916); Thuemenidium arenarium (Rostr.) Korf (1982)

= Sabuloglossum =

Genus of fungi

Sabuloglossum is a fungal genus in the earth tongue family Geoglossaceae. Circumscribed in 2013, it contains the single widely distributed species Sabuloglossum arenarium, which has previously been placed in the genera Microglossum, Corynetes, Geoglossum, and Thuemenidium. The generic name derives from the Latin word sabulum and refers to its preference for sandy habitats.
