= Interdunal wetland =

Water-filled depression between coastal sand dunes

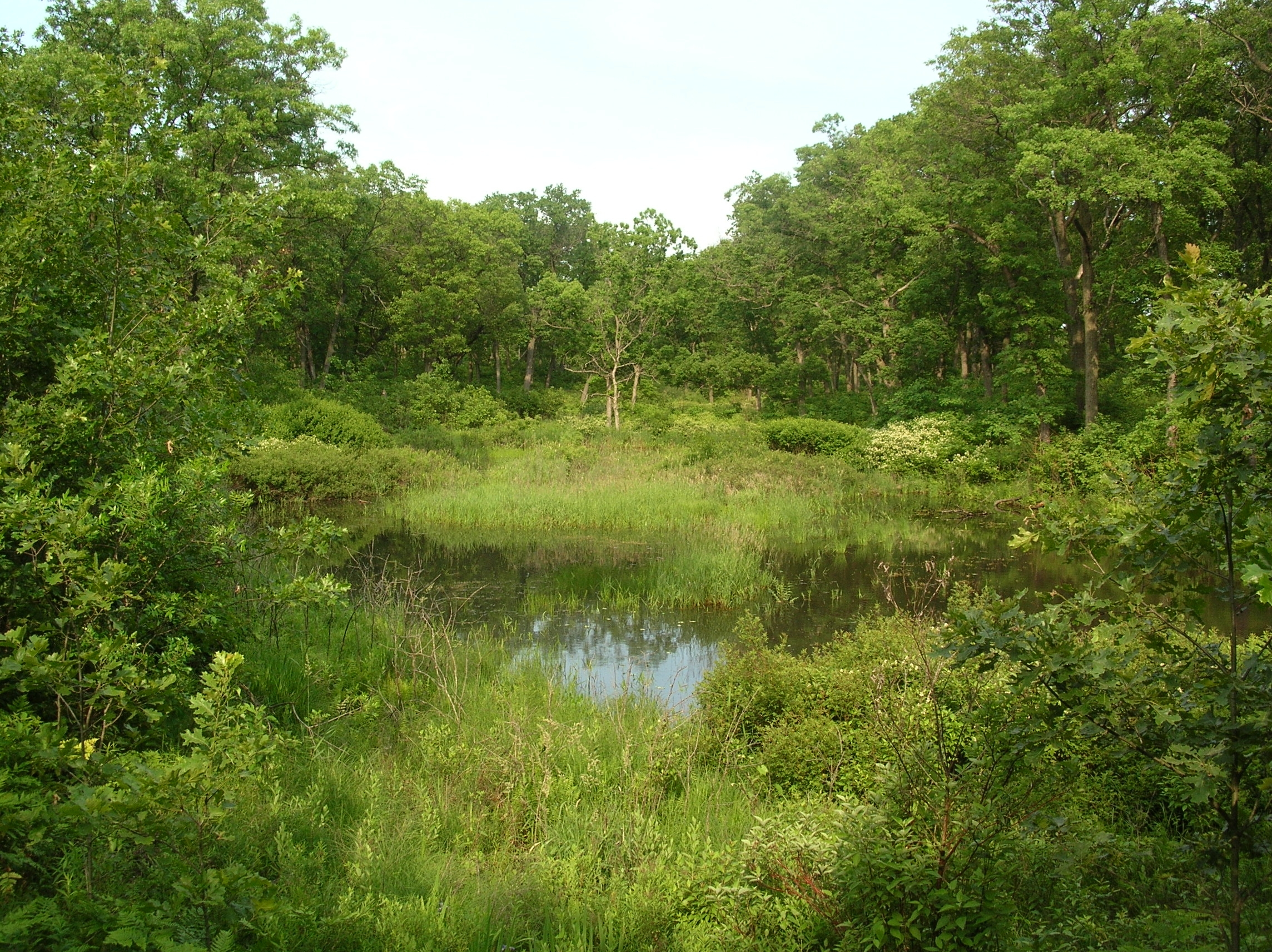
An interdunal wetland in wooded dunes, at Miller Woods in the Indiana Dunes National Park.

An interdunal wetland, interdunal pond or dune slack is a water-filled depression between coastal sand dunes. It may be formed either by wind erosion or by dunal encroachment on an existing wetland. The wind erosion process involves wind scooping out sufficient sand to reach the water table, and typically occurs behind the first line of foredunes.

Because they are typically very shallow, interdunal wetlands warm quickly, and provide an abundant source of invertebrates eaten by many species of shorebirds. Many interdunal wetlands are ephemeral, drying out during periods of low rain or low water.

Interdunal wetlands are common in Great Lakes region of North America, particularly along the eastern shore of Lake Michigan, such as at Indiana Dunes National Park and Sleeping Bear Dunes National Lakeshore. In this region, interdunal communities are typically mildly calcareous and dominated by rushes, sedges and shrubs. They are tentatively classified as G2, or globally imperiled, under the NatureServe rankings. Many conservation efforts have been made to preserve these wetlands within the Indiana Dunes.

A distinction is sometimes made between interdunal and intradunal wetlands such as pannes, which form within a single dune as part of a blowout.
