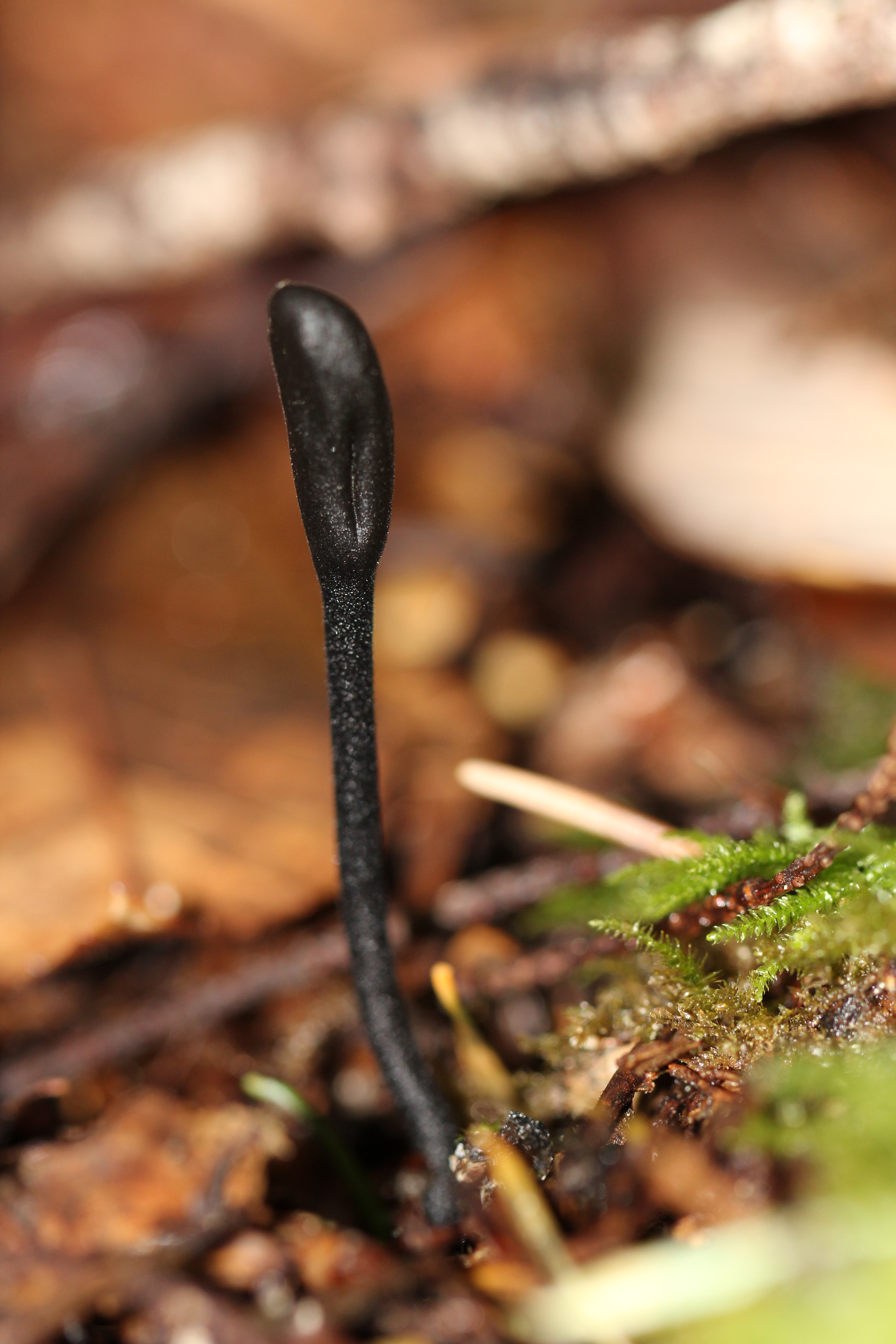
- Trichoglossum hirsutum

Scientific classification
- Kingdom: Fungi
- Division: Ascomycota
- Class: Geoglossomycetes
- Order: Geoglossales
- Family: Geoglossaceae
- Genus: Trichoglossum; Boud. (1885)

Type species
- Trichoglossum hirsutum (Pers.) Boud. (1907)

= Trichoglossum =

Genus of fungi

Trichoglossum is a genus of fungi in the family Geoglossaceae. They are commonly called hairy earth tongues. The type species is Trichoglossum hirsutum.

Members of the genus Trichoglossum have tiny hairs known as setae on the spore bearing surface. The related genus Geoglossum lacks hairs on the spore bearing surface.

== History ==
The genus Trichoglossum was created by Émile Boudier, who constructed the new genus to include species of Geoglossum bearing prominent setae. Numerous authors have examined this genus since its creation, with many new species and varieties described. Index Fungorum currently lists 47 names, including forms and varieties, while Kirk et al. (2008) acknowledge 19 species. Published molecular phylogenetic research also supports the genus as a well-supported clade.

== Location ==
Trichoglossum species are found in woodlands in North America and Europe, as well as Asia, Australasia, India, and South America.

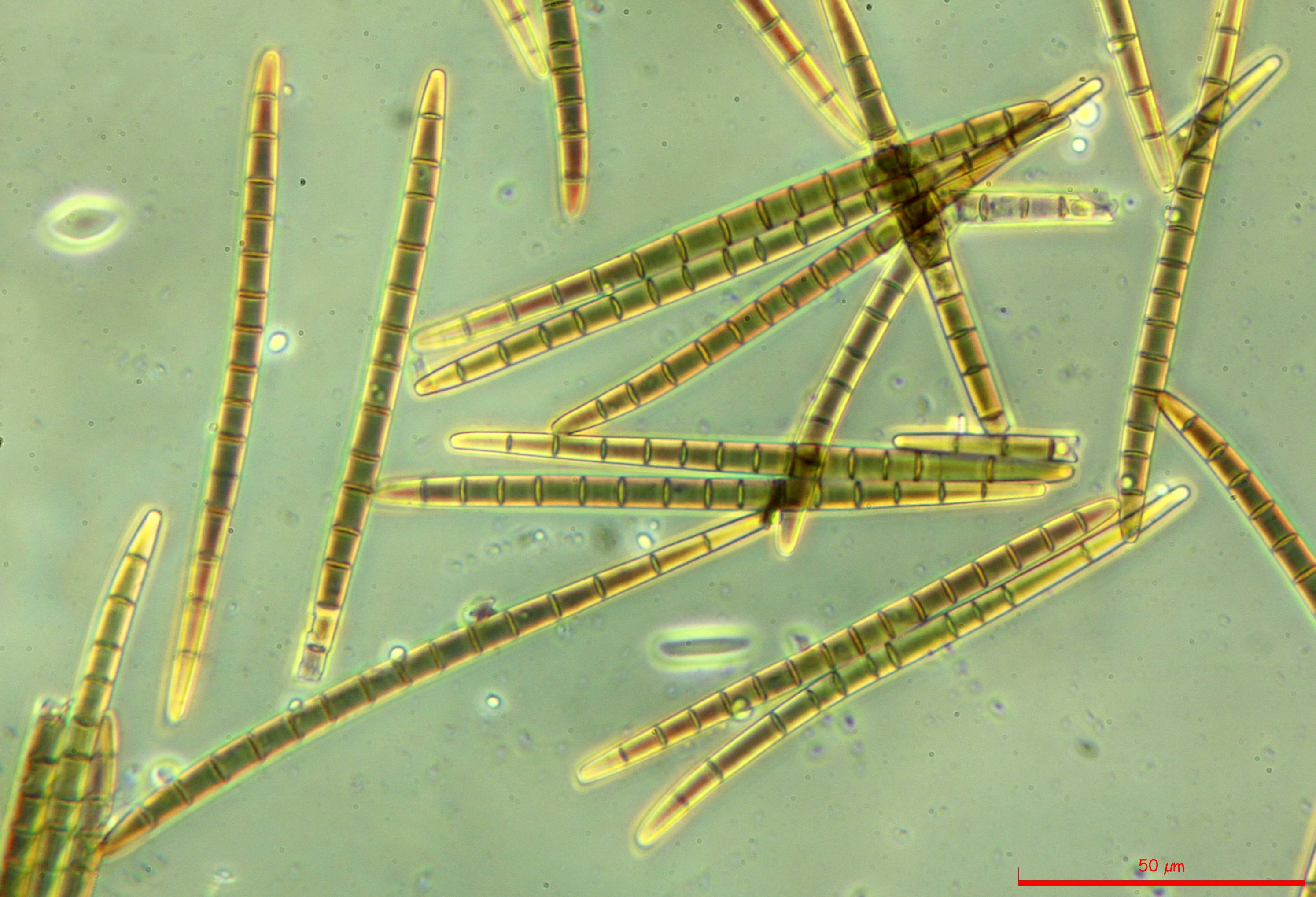
Trichoglossum hirsutum spores 400x phase contrast

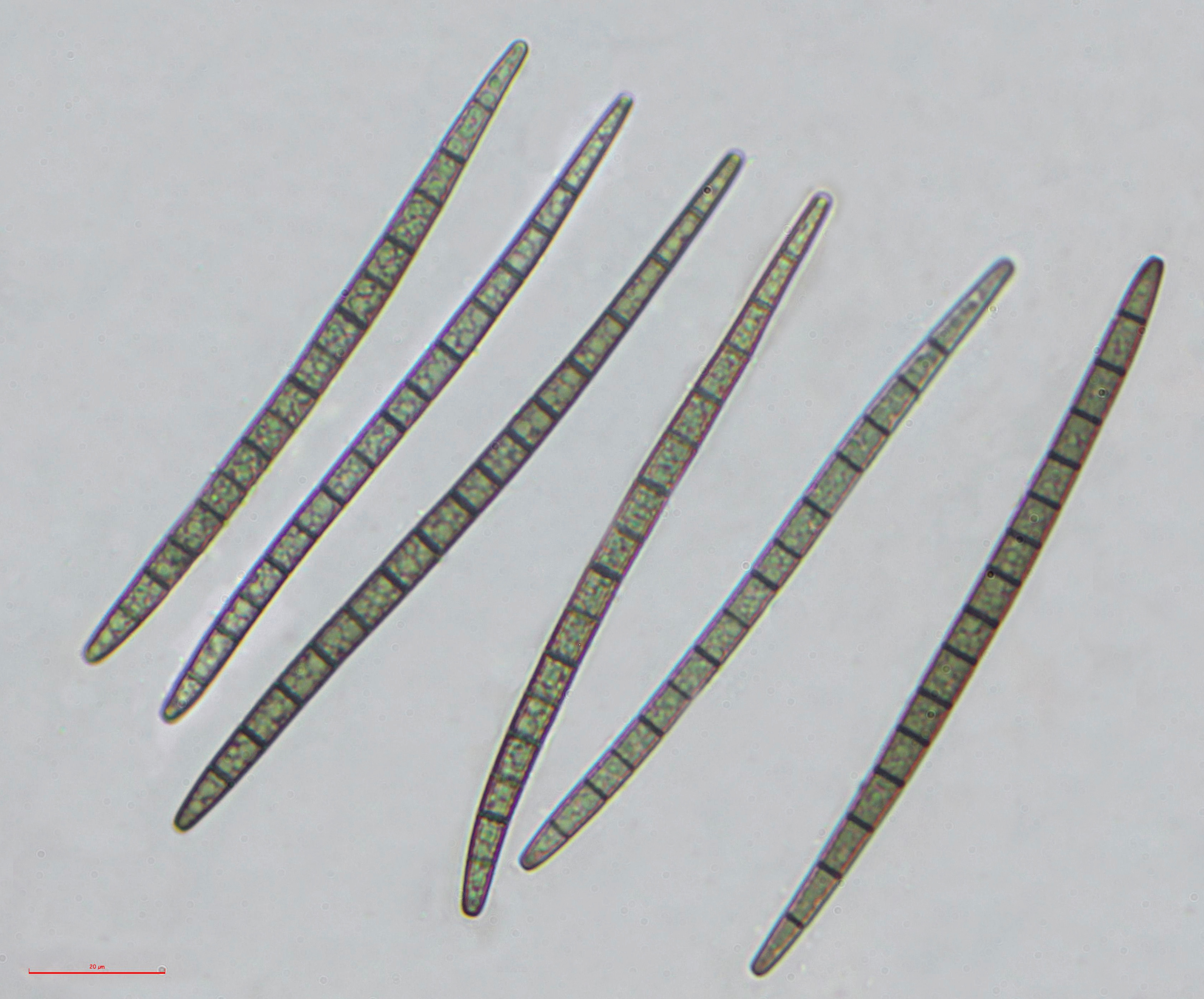
Trichoglossum hirsutum spores 400x brightfield

== Species ==
- Trichoglossum cheliense F.L.Tai 1944
- Trichoglossum confusum E.J.Durand 1921
- Trichoglossum farlowii (Cooke) E.J.Durand 1908
- Trichoglossum gracile Pat. 1909
- Trichoglossum hirsutum (Pers.) Boud. 1907
- Trichoglossum kunmingense F.L.Tai 1944
- Trichoglossum leucosporum Benkert & Hardtke 1988
- Trichoglossum octopartitum Mains 1940
- Trichoglossum persoonii F.L.Tai 1944
- Trichoglossum peruvianum E.K.Cash 1958
- Trichoglossum qingchengense W.Y.Zhuang 1997
- Trichoglossum rasum Pat. 1909
- Trichoglossum rehmianum (Henn.) E.J. Durand 1908
- Trichoglossum sinicum F.L.Tai 1944
- Trichoglossum tetrasporum Sinden & Fitzp. 1930
- Trichoglossum variabile (E.J.Durand) Nannf. 1942
- Trichoglossum velutipes (Peck) E.J.Durand 1908
- Trichoglossum walteri (Berk.) E.J.Durand 1908
- Trichoglossum wrightii (E.J.Durand) E.J.Durand 1921
