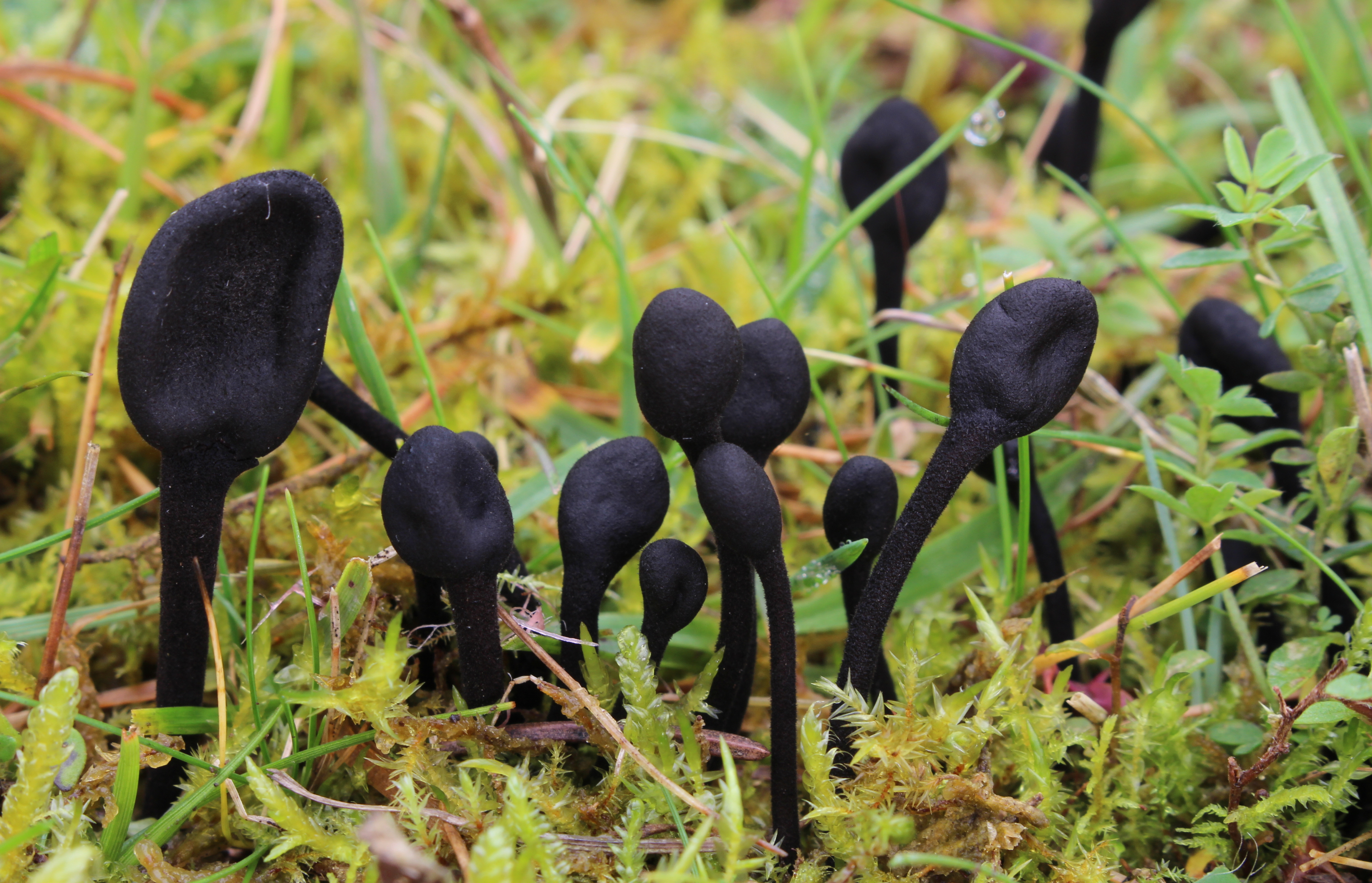
- Trichoglossum hirsutum, Germany

Scientific classification
- Kingdom: Fungi
- Division: Ascomycota
- Class: Geoglossomycetes
- Order: Geoglossales
- Family: Geoglossaceae
- Genus: Trichoglossum
- Species: T. hirsutum

Binomial name
- Trichoglossum hirsutum (Pers.) Boud. (1907)

Synonyms
- Geoglossum hirsutum Pers. (1794)

= Trichoglossum hirsutum =

Species of fungus

Trichoglossum hirsutum
- Mycological characteristics
- Smooth hymenium
- No distinct cap
- Hymenium attachment is irregular or not applicable
- Stipe is bare
- Ecology is saprotrophic

Trichoglossum hirsutum is a species of fungus in the family Geoglossaceae. In the UK, it has been given the recommended English name of hairy earthtongue. In North America it is known variously as velvety black earth tongue, velvety earth tongue, shaggy earth tongue, or black earth tongue. DNA evidence suggests the hairy earthtongue may be a species complex.

== Taxonomy ==
The species was first described by mycologist Christian Hendrik Persoon in 1794 as Geoglossum hirsutum. In 1907 Jean Louis Émile Boudier transferred the species to his new genus Trichoglossum, of which it is the type. Initial molecular research, based on cladistic analysis of DNA sequences, indicates that Trichoglossum hirsutum sensu lato comprises at least three separate taxa in Europe and North America, though these may not be morphologically distinguishable. At least one of these cryptic species occurs in both continents.

== Description ==
Ascocarps are club-shaped, up to 9 centimetres (3 1/2 in) tall, black to dark brown, with a swollen, spore-bearing head, up to a quarter or half the ascocarp height, and a finely hirsute, cylindrical stipe (stem) up to 5 millimetres (1/4 in) wide. Microscopically, dark, thick-walled, acute setae are present. The asci are 8-spored, the ascospores 110–160 × 5–7 μm, becoming 15-septate at maturity.

The epithet hirsutum (Latin: 'hairy') refers to the fine hairs (setae) that cover the ascocarp.

=== Similar species ===
Many Trichoglossum species appear similar in the field and can only be identified by microscopic examination. Superficially similar species of Geoglossum lack setae and are not finely hirsute under a hand lens. Thuemenidium atropurpureum is usually more robust and can be slightly purplish. Microglossum species have non-black hues. Tolypocladium ophioglossoides can appear similar in age.

== Conservation ==
In Europe the short-spored earthtongue is typical of waxcap grasslands, a declining habitat due to changing agricultural practices.

== Edibility ==
It is reported to be edible but is too tough to be of great interest.

== Gallery ==
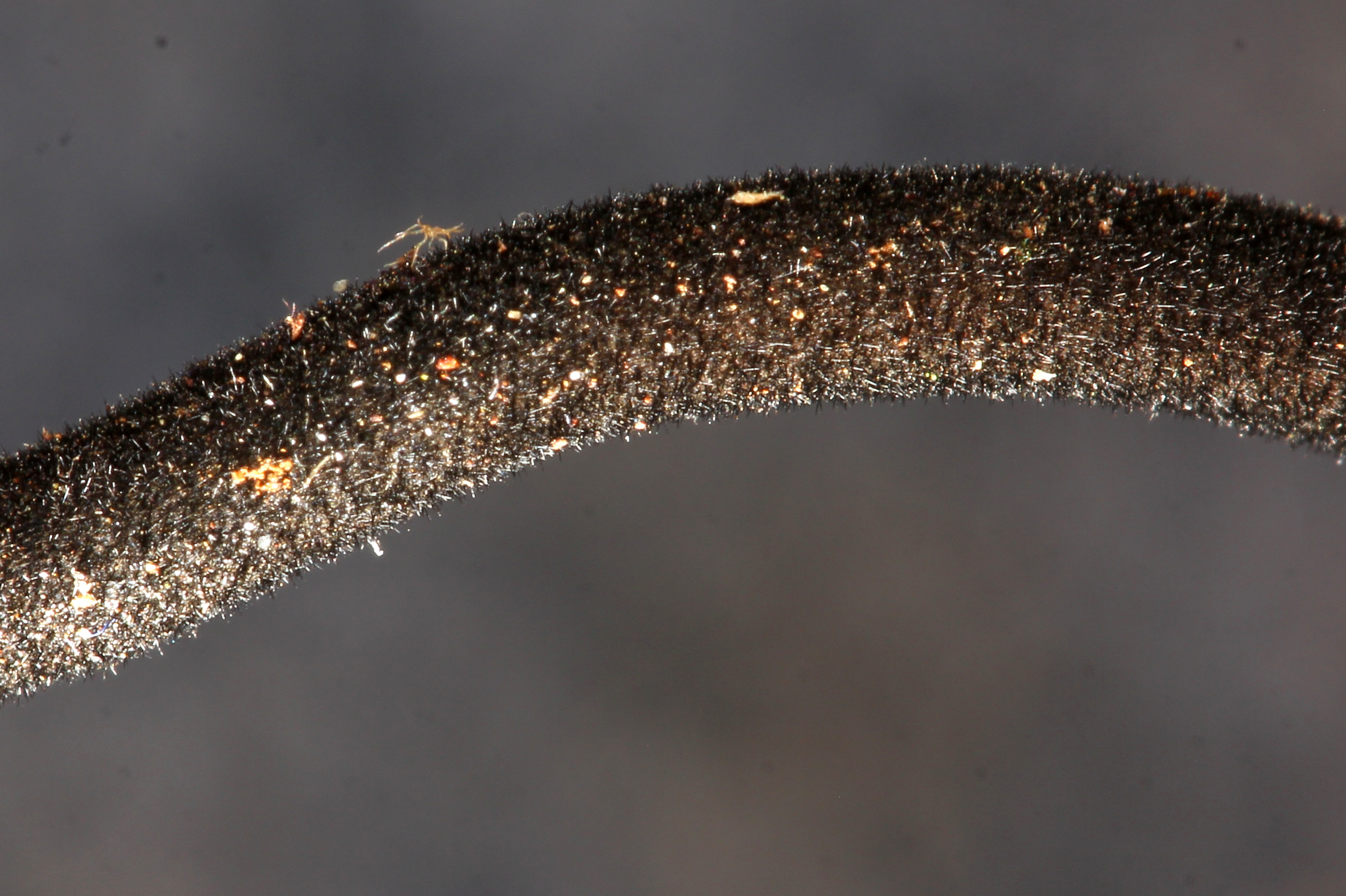
Trichoglossum hirsutum stipe

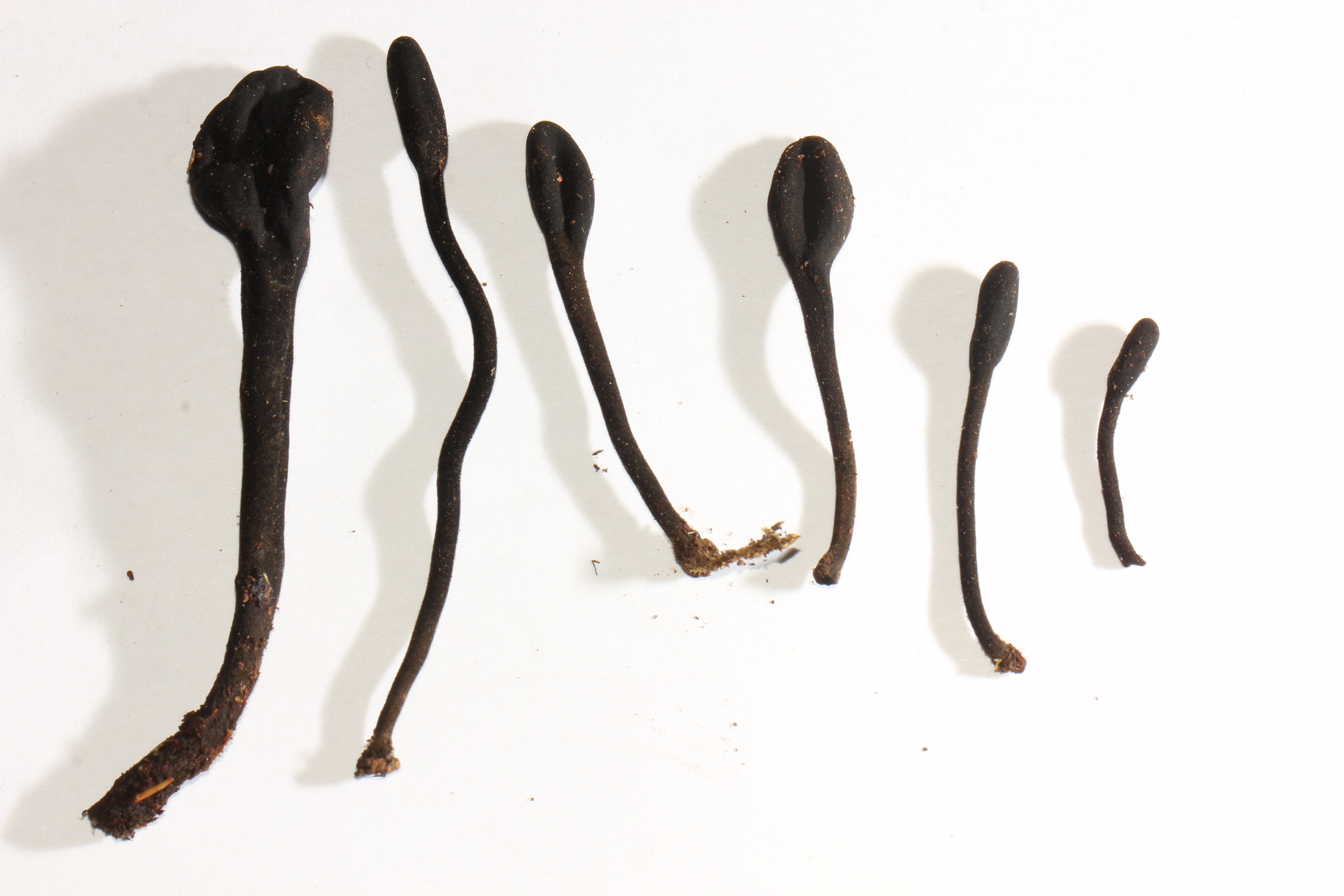
Trichoglossum hirsutum

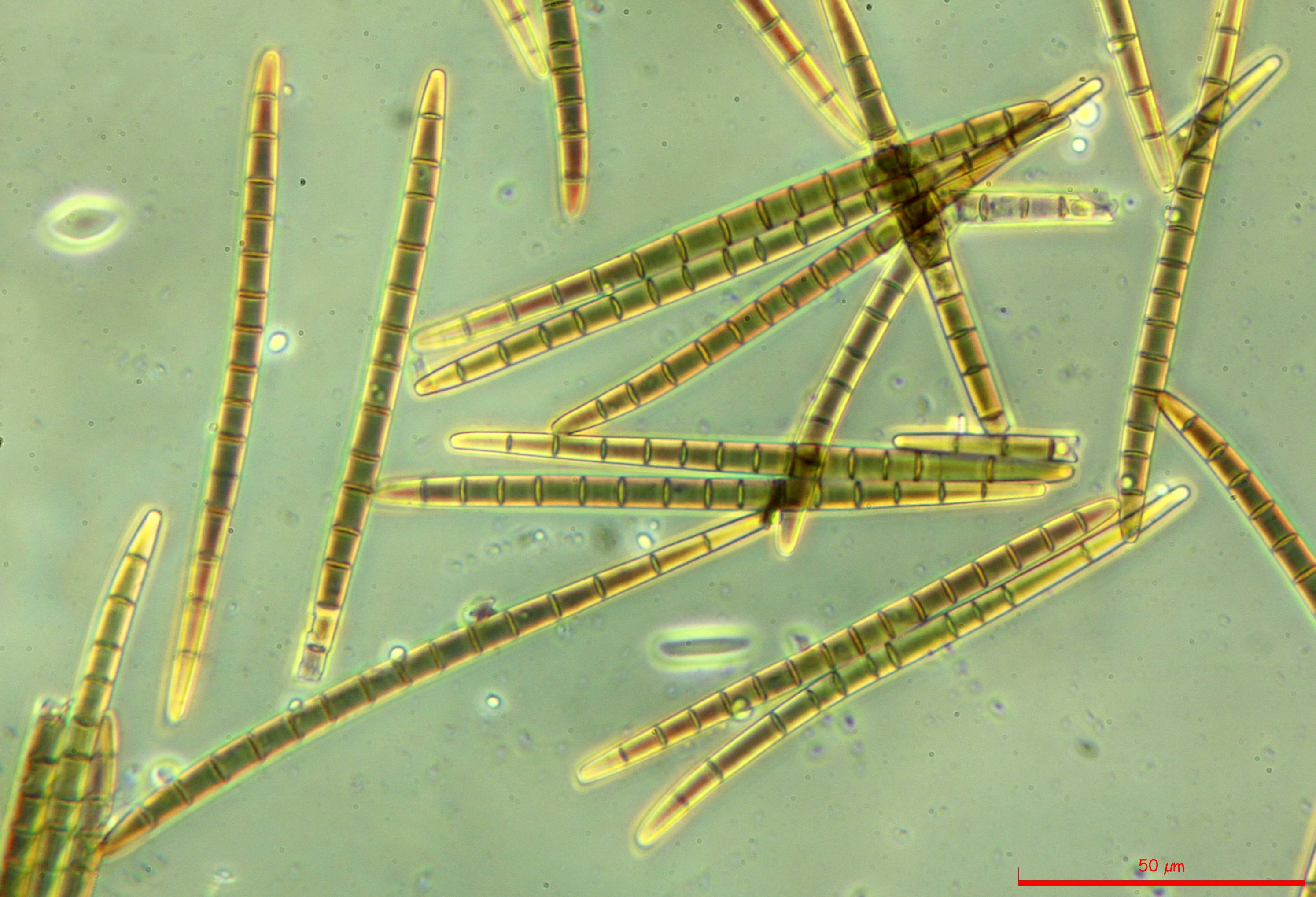
Trichoglossum hirsutum spores 400x phase contrast

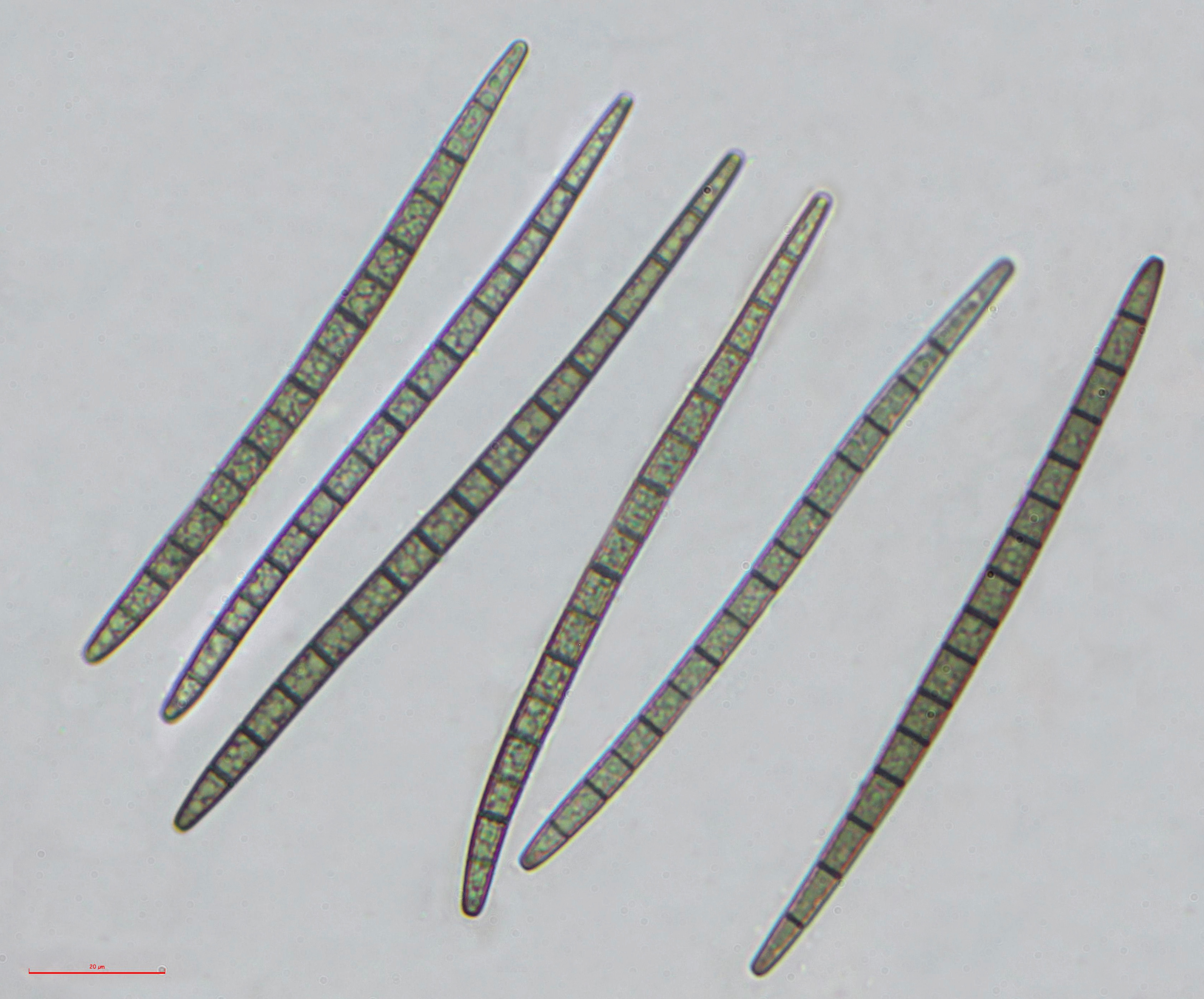
Trichoglossum hirsutum spores 400x brightfield
