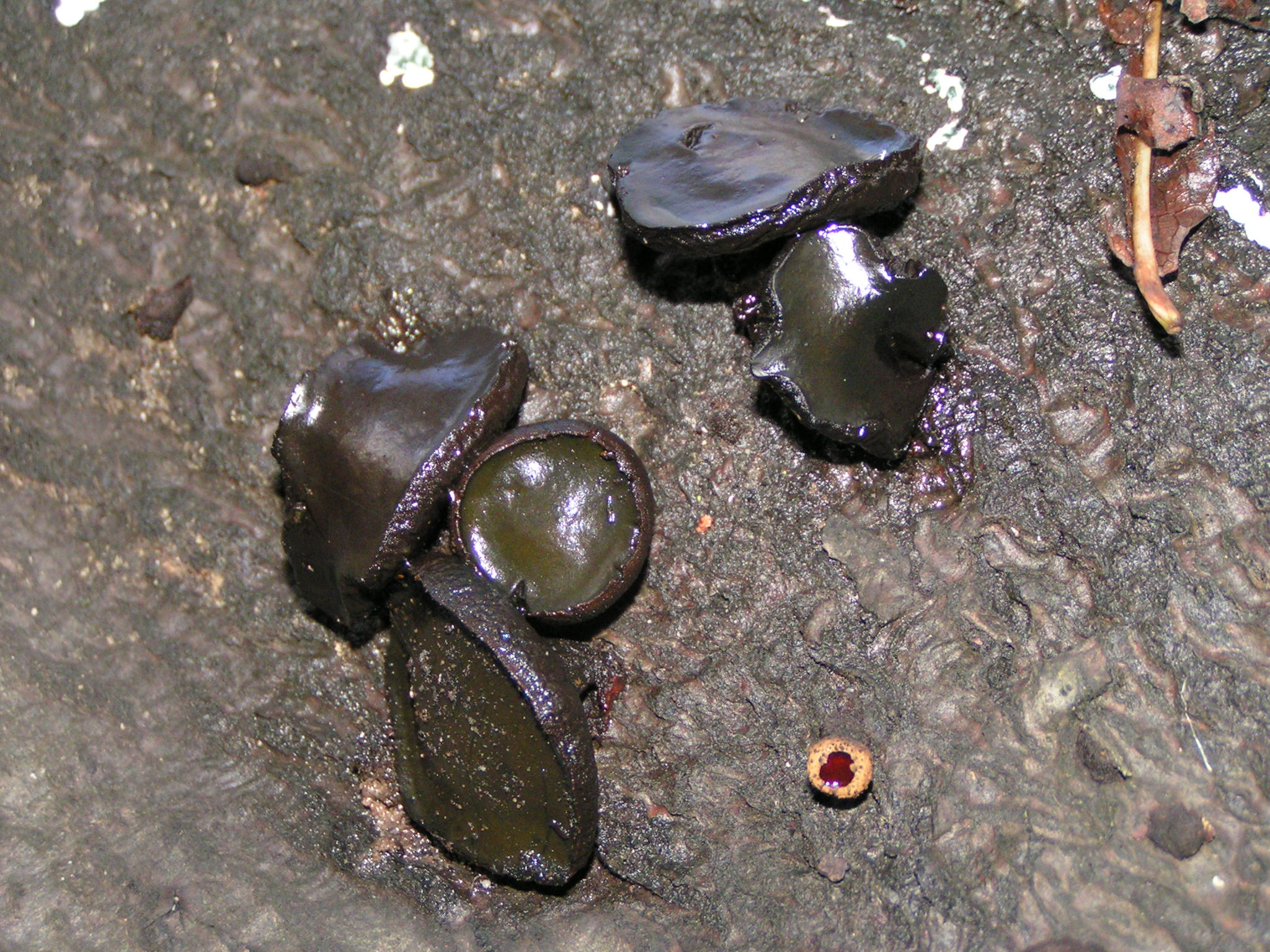
- Bulgaria inquinans

Scientific classification
- Domain: Eukaryota
- Kingdom: Fungi
- Division: Ascomycota
- Class: Leotiomycetes
- Subclass: Leotiomycetidae; O.E. Erikss. & Winka

Orders
- Helotiales Medeolariales Rhytismatales Thelebolales

= Leotiomycetidae =

Subclass of fungi

The Leotiomycetidae are a subclass of the fungal class Leotiomycetes.

== Taxonomy ==
Order: Helotiales

Family: Ascocorticiaceae
Family: Bulgariaceae
Family: Cudoniaceae
Family: Cyttariaceae
Family: Dermateaceae
Family: Geoglossaceae
Family: Helotiaceae
Family: Hemiphacidiaceae
Family: Hyaloscyphaceae
Family: Leotiaceae
Family: Loramycetaceae
Family: Phacidiaceae
Family: Rutstroemiaceae
Family: Sclerotiniaceae
Family: Vibrisseaceae

Order: Lahmiales

Family: Lahmiaceae

Order: Medeolariales

Family: Medeolariaceae

Order: Rhytismatales

Family: Ascodichaenaceae
Family: Cryptomycetaceae
Family: Cudoniaceae
Family: Rhytismataceae

Order: Thelebolales
