= Lambertella corni-maris =

Scientific classification
- Kingdom: Fungi
- Division: Ascomycota
- Class: Leotiomycetes
- Order: Helotiales
- Family: Rutstroemiaceae
- Genus: Lambertella
- Species: L. corni-maris

Binomial name
- Lambertella corni-maris Höhn. (1918)

Synonyms
- Lambertella corni-maris f. pyrina Höhn.

Species of fungus

Lambertella corni-maris is a small ascomycete fungi. It grows in deciduous fruit areas, and causes postharvest Lambertella rot on apple fruits. The species also forms a mycoparasitism relationship with Monilinia fructigena. It is the type species of the genus Lambertella.

== Taxonomy ==
Lambertella corni-maris was first described in 1918, and named for Lambert Gelbenegger. The genus Lambertella was created for the discovery of L. corni-maris.

== Description ==
When found on apples or grown on rotting fruit in the lab, L. corni-maris forms apothecia. The apothecia are positively phototropic, though light does not affect growth. They vary in shape and color depending on maturity. They begin crateriform, then saucer-shaped, then flatten as they mature. They range from pale pink to dark brown, varied by location and age. Apothecia found on apples ranges from 1 to 5 mm, while those found on pears ranged from 1.5 to 7.5 mm.

Asci are shortly stalked, clavate, and inoperculate. The average size of asci is 100 x 7.5 μm. Asci contain eight ovoid spores, which begin colorless, and turn dark brown as they mature. Spores are unicellular and contain two vacuoles. Paraphyses are colorless, aseptate and unbranched, and numerous, either equal to or exceeding the number of asci.

Lambertella corni-maris has several unique features noted when grown on agar. Its most favorable medium contains glucose and peptone as sources of carbon and nitrogen. Optimum pH for growth is 4.4, though growth occurs from pH 1.6-8.3. The species tends to grow towards areas higher in acidity. It can grow in temperatures ranging from 5° to 30° C, and the optimum temperature is 20° C. No growth occurs at 30° C or above. While it is most often found on apples in the wild, under lab conditions it can cause disease on the fruits of pear, plum, quince, orange, lemon, as well as turnip and parsnip. It did not attack when inoculated in young wood of apple, pear, cherry, and plum.

== Distribution ==
Lambertella corni-maris was first discovered in Austria on cherry fruits. It is distributed throughout western Europe, and has also been noted in Japan, and the Pacific northwest United States.

== Postharvest rot and mycoparasitism ==
Lambertella corni-maris causes the disease postharvest rot, found most often on apples. Several proposed names for this disease are yellow rot, or Lambertella rot. It likely infects fruit through wounds that occur during harvest, as in the lab, non-wounded apples did not develop yellow rot. The excretion of the cell wall degrading enzyme pectinase allows L. corni-maris to attack fruits. It causes brown spongy lesions on apple fruits, and may also grow thick yellow mycelia.

Lambertella corni-maris displays antagonism to many species of fungi and bacteria. It can live alone as an apple fruit pathogen, but will also replace Monilinia species on fruit. L. corni-maris displays allelopathic activity against Monilinia fructigena, which is a species that causes brown rot on apples. In this interaction, L. corni-maris secretes the antibiotic lambertellols A and B. The lambertellols are produced both in the presence and absence of the host M. fructigena. Lambertellol production also increases under acidic conditions, or in the presence of M. fructigena, which has been found to make its surroundings acidic. Lambertellols A and B inhibit hyphal germination of M. fructigena. In acidic conditions, lambertellols A and B become stable, allowing them to diffuse towards the host. A and B then decompose into lambertellin, which inhibits the host and allows infection by L. corni-maris. This interaction has been reported to occur on potato sucrose agar and on apple fruits. The antagonistic biotic environment caused by L. corni-maris may have driven genetic divergence between Japanese and European strains of M. fructigena.
