= Dollar spot =

Scientific classification
- Kingdom: Fungi
- Division: Ascomycota
- Class: Ascomycetes
- Order: Helotiales
- Family: Rutstroemiaceae
- Genus: Clarireedia
- Species: Clarireedia homoeocarpa

Binomial name
- Clarireedia homoeocarpa (F.T. Benn.) L.A. Beirn, B.B. Clarke, C. Salgado & J.A. Crouch

Plant fungal disease

Dollar spot is a fungal disease of turfgrass caused by the four species in the genus Clarireedia, in the family Rutstroemiaceae. The pathogen blights leaf tissues but does not affect turf grass roots or crowns. There is evidence that a fungal mycotoxin produced by the pathogen may cause root damage, including necrosis of the apical meristem in creeping bentgrass (Agrostis stolonifera). However, the importance of this toxin is unknown and its effects are not considered a direct symptom of dollar spot. The disease is a common concern on golf courses on intensely managed putting greens, fairways and bowling greens. It is also common on less rigorously maintained lawns and recreational fields. Disease symptoms commonly result in poor turf quality and appearance. The disease occurs from late spring through late fall, but is most active under conditions of high humidity and warm daytime temperatures 59–86 °F (15–30 °C) and cool nights in the spring, early summer and fall. The disease infects by producing a mycelium, which can be spread mechanically from one area to another.

== Designation ==
The official taxonomic designation of the causal agent of dollar spot has been controversial since it was first described in 1932. In 1946, it was found that the pathogen previously known as Sclerotinia homoeocarpa is not part of the genus Sclerotinia nor the family Sclerotinaceae due to its lack of apothecia-producing tuberoid sclerotia. Sexual spores have never been observed in culture of North American isolates, and only infertile apothecia have been documented. The absence of fruiting bodies made the taxonomic classification of the fungus extremely difficult until the introduction of DNA sequencing and analysis.

In 2018, Salgado-Salazar et al. used DNA sequencing data to analyze the causal agent of dollar spot and a new genus, Clarireedia, was created to accommodate the pathogen within the family Rutstroemiaceae based on their findings. This genus now includes four species: Clarireedia bennettii sp. nov., Clarireedia jacksonii sp. nov., Clarireedia homoeocarpa sp.nov., and Clarireedia monteithiana sp.nov. Clarireedia homoeocarpa and C. bennettii are only known to occur on cool-season grass hosts and are only known from the UK. Clarireedia jacksonii and C. monteithiana occur on cool-season and warm-season grasses, respectively, and are distributed globally.

== Hosts ==
Dollar spot is most commonly found on closely mowed turfgrasses. The pathogen infects most cool and warm-season grasses throughout the world, including creeping bentgrass (Agrostis stolonifera), annual bluegrass (Poa annua), Kentucky bluegrass (Poa pratensis), perennial ryegrass (Lolium perenne), hybrid bermudagrasses (Cynodon dactylon x tranvaalensis), seashore paspalum (Paspalum vaginatum), and zoysiagrass (Zoysia spp.)

== Symptoms ==
On fine textured and close-cut turf, the disease appears as round, brown to straw-colored and somewhat sunken spots approximately the size of a silver dollar. In coarse textured grasses maintained at taller cutting heights, the dead spots are larger and more diffuse. Spots are often seen in clusters. Dollar spot is readily distinguished from other turf disease by light-tan lesions with a reddish-brown border on the leaf blades of live plants near the edge of the affected area. Older lesions may take on a characteristic hourglass shape. On fine bladed grasses, the lesions usually girdle the leaf blade. Early in the day or in periods of extended dew, cobweb-like mycelium of the fungus can be seen growing on affected areas. During early stages of the disease, affected plants may appear water-soaked and wilted, but spots quickly fade to a characteristic straw color. The mycelium found on foliage is often confused with that of Pythium, Nigrospora, and Rhizoctonia.

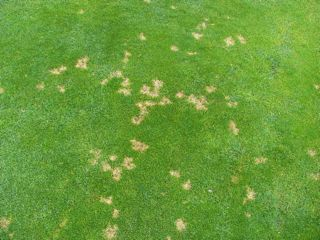
Dollar spot symptoms on creeping bentgrass.

== Disease cycle ==
The pathogen overwinters and survives unfavorable periods as dormant mycelium on infected plants and plant debris. In addition to mycelium, dollar spot survives harsh environments in stromata on leaf surfaces. Apothecia occasionally are formed by the pathogen, but are sterile. Sexual spores have not yet been discovered in North America.

Dissemination of the pathogen is restricted to the movements of infected leaf debris via equipment, people, animals, wind, or water. When environmental conditions become favorable for pathogen activity (warm, humid, high moisture in canopy), the dormant mycelia and stromata on the infected debris resume growing on the plant tissues. If moisture is sufficient in the turf canopy, mycelium can begin to penetrate new leaves and new host, causing infection.

== Environment ==
Prolonged periods of high humidity are required for the disease to infect, and infection may occur from late spring through late autumn. Conducive temperatures for dollar spot range anywhere between 59 and 86 °F (15 and 30 °C); different biotypes of the pathogen infect at different temperatures. Dew formation, which is driven by warm temperatures and high humidity levels during the day, followed by cool nights, enhances disease development. Dollar spot is more severe in dry soils, yet the disease requires high moisture in the turf canopy to thrive. Low nitrogen fertility can increase dollar spot susceptibility of the turfgrass. Nitrogen stress can contribute to disease severity because plants that lack nitrogen are more likely to develop weakened, senescent foliage that is more vulnerable to infection than plants with adequate N levels.

== Management ==
Cultural management

Dollar spot's occurrence and severity can be minimized through cultural practices. By minimizing leaf wetness via sound irrigation practices, the environment becomes less favorable for the pathogen to infect. Irrigation should be applied deeply and infrequently. Irrigation events should not occur in the late afternoon or evening, as this prolongs leaf wetness and may intensify disease. Removing dew and guttation fluids from the canopy can help lessen disease severity. This can be accomplished by mowing, rolling, "dew-whipping," or dragging a rope across the turf. Provide adequate air circulation by removing trees or installing large fans. Aerification and thatch removal are valuable tools; relieving compaction and thatch buildup allows the soil and canopy to dry more quickly. Light, frequent applications of nitrogen enhance the recuperative ability of the plant, allowing the turf to hide the symptoms of dollar spot and recover from any damage sustained. N-supplemented grasses grow more quickly and display vigorous growth and robust, healthy tissue. Quicker growth results in more frequent mowing, which removes necrotic tissue and improved the appearance of turf affected by dollar spot.

Newer cultivars of creeping bentgrass (Agrostis stolonifera) have been bred for dollar spot resistance. The National Turfgrass Evaluation Program conducts disease susceptibility trials, and results can be found on their website.

Chemical control

Chemical control is an option for practitioners who need to maintain high quality, visually pleasing turfgrass. There are many fungicides labeled for control of Sclerotinia homoeocarpa, including benzimidazoles, carboxamides, nitriles, dicarboxamides, and demethylation inhibitors (DMIs). Some common fungicides used include chlorothalonil (nitrile), propiconazole (DMI), boscalid (carboxamide), thiophanate-methyl (benzimidazole), and iprodione (dicarboxamide). Preventative fungicide programs should be implemented when conditions are favorable for disease development (i.e., in the Spring when nighttime temperatures reach 50 °F (10 °C)). While preventative applications are most effective, curative applications are also successful, but often require high rates and short application intervals.

Adequate coverage of fungicides will maximize fungicide performance. Adequate coverage can be achieved by applying fungicides in 2 gallons of water per 1000 ft2 through an air induction or flat fan nozzle producing fine to medium size droplets. Fungicide applications on golf courses normally require large commercial sprayers equipped with the appropriate nozzles. Appropriate personal protective equipment (PPE) is necessary for applying most fungicides and includes coveralls over short-sleeved shirts and pants, chemical resistant gloves, chemical resistant footwear, and protective eyewear. Always follow label precautions, including restricted entry intervals (REI) and first aid, when applying any pesticide.

Some biotypes of the pathogen have developed resistance to chemical groups including the benzimidazoles, dicarboximides, and sterol biosynthesis inhibitors. To slow or avoid the development of resistance, chemical classes should be rotated with each application. As of 2023 insufficient research is available specifying the resistance genetics responsible. A few are known: Hulvey et al., 2012 find that overexpression of two Clarireedia genes – ShCYP51B and ShatrD – are responsible for demethylation inhibitor resistance.

== Importance ==
Dollar spot is one of the most economically important turfgrass diseases. In Wisconsin, golf course superintendents typically spend 60–75% of their chemical budgets spraying for dollar spot. The average cost of controlling foliar diseases, including dollar spot, on golf courses is about $15,000 per golf course per year. This works out to about 10 fungicide treatments annually. The disease affects the majority of turfgrass species, and is active under a wide range of temperatures. Dollar spot is the most common turfgrass disease in North America, with the exception of the Pacific Northwestern United States and Western Canada. When left untreated, dollar spot can reach 90% disease severity and more money is spent per year to manage dollar spot than any other fungal disease.
