= Rutstroemia punicae =

Scientific classification
- Kingdom: Fungi
- Division: Ascomycota
- Class: Leotiomycetes
- Order: Helotiales
- Family: Rutstroemiaceae
- Genus: Rutstroemia
- Species: R. punicae

Binomial name
- Rutstroemia punicae B.Perić, 2019

Species of fungus

Rutstroemia punicae is a species of fungus in the family Rutstroemiaceae found in Montenegro.

== Taxonomy ==
The species was formally described in 2019 by Montenegrin mycologist Branislav Perić. The type specimen was collected in Glizica, Danilovgrad Municipality, Montenegro, in November 2017. The specific epithet punicae refers to the genus of its host plant, Punica granatum.

== Description ==
Its apothecia, when fresh or rehydrated, are erumpent, substipitate, cup- to disc-shaped structures measuring 0.5–2.5 mm in diameter. The hymenium displays a cinnamon-ochre color with yellowish to olive tints, aging to brown, while the outer surface is brown to reddish-brown. Microscopically, the asci are 120–150 × 10–15 µm, 8-spored, feature a Sclerotinia-type amyloid apical ring, and arise from croziers. The ascospores are smooth, hyaline, and cylindrical-allantoid, measuring 13–21 × 3.5–5.5 µm; they contain minute lipid bodies (0.3–0.7 µm) and become 1-septate when overmature. The paraphyses are cylindrical, sometimes slightly inflated at the apex, and contain hyaline, non-refractive vacuoles. Anatomically, the medullary excipulum consists of hyaline textura intricata, while the ectal excipulum is of textura prismatica-porrecta with horizontally oriented, brownish, strongly incrusted external hyphae. Octahedral crystals are present in the ectal excipulum at the margin.

== Distribution ==
The fungus is known only from Danilovgrad Municipality. Its holotype was collected in Glizica, and two paratype collections were made in the Bjelopavlići plain: one approximately 1.9 km northeast of Donje Selo, and another 1 km northwest of Gornji Martinići, at an altitude of 210 m.

== Habitat ==
Its habitat is the bark of periodically dry, corticated twigs and branches (2–8 mm thick) of Punica granatum (pomegranate) in a submediterranean environment. The substrate is calcareous.
