= Lambertella =

Scientific classification
- Kingdom: Fungi
- Division: Ascomycota
- Class: Leotiomycetes
- Order: Helotiales
- Family: Rutstroemiaceae
- Genus: Lambertella; Höhn. (1918)

Type species
- Lambertella corni-maris Höhn. (1918)

Synonyms
- Coprotinia Whetzel (1944); Phaeociboria Höhn. (1918); Phaeodiscus L.R.Batra (1968)

Genus of fungi

Lambertella is a genus of fungi in the family Rutstroemiaceae.

The genus name of Lambertella is in honour of Lambert Gelbenegger (1867-1929), an Austrian clergyman and botanist.

The genus was circumscribed by Franz Xaver Rudolf von Höhnel in Sitzungsber. Kaiserl. Akad. Wiss., Math.-Nat. Kl. Abt. Vol.1, on pages 127-375 in 1918.

== Species ==
- L. acuminata
- L. agaricicola
- L. aurantiaca
- L. belisensis
- L. berberidis
- L. boliviana
- L. bonahawensis
- L. bouchetii
- L. brevispora
- L. brunneola
- L. buchwaldii
- L. carpatica
- L. caudatoides
- L. cephalanthi
- L. chromoflava
- L. colombiana
- L. copticola
- L. corni
- L. corni-maris
- L. cryptomeriae
- L. crystallina
- L. fuscotomentosa
- L. fuscotomentosa
- L. garryae
- L. guizhouensis
- L. hicoriae
- L. himalayensis
- L. indica
- L. jasmini
- L. kumaonica
- L. kumaonica
- L. langei
- L. lasseri
- L. latispora
- L. makilingensis
- L. malesiana
- L. mexicana
- L. microspora
- L. mussooriensis
- L. myricae
- L. nainitalensis
- L. nipponica
- L. norvegica
- L. obpyriformis
- L. orientalis
- L. pachysandrae
- L. pallidispora
- L. palmeri
- L. phaeoparaphysata
- L. pruni
- L. pseudostriata
- L. pyrolae
- L. rhamnicola
- L. rubi
- L. spadiceoatra
- L. subalpina
- L. subrenispora
- L. tengii
- L. tetrica
- L. tewarii
- L. thindii
- L. torquata
- L. tropicalis
- L. tubulosa
- L. venezuelensis
- L. verrucosispora
- L. viburni
- L. whetzelii
- L. xishuangbanna
- L. yunnanensis
- L. zeylanica
