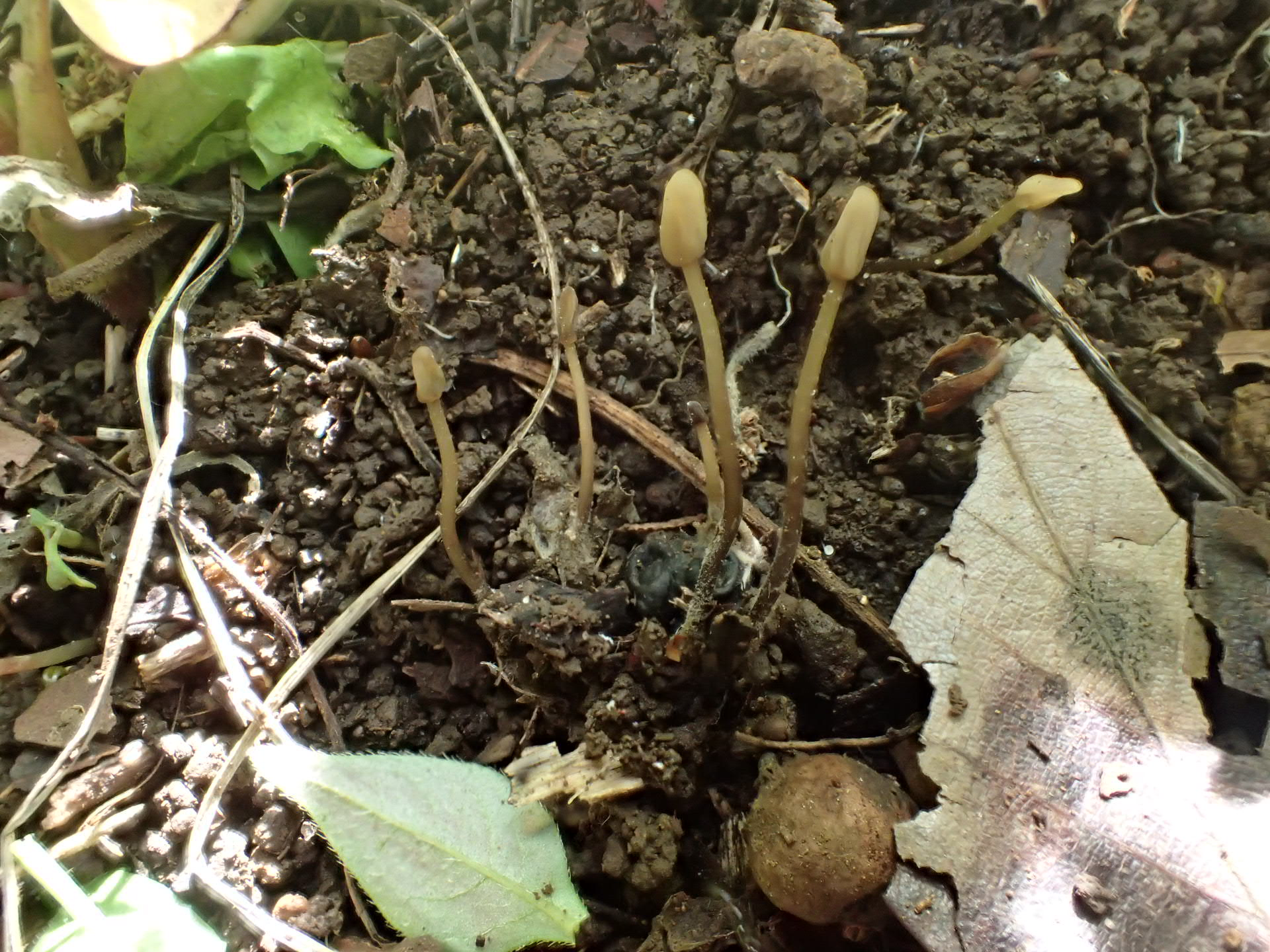
- Scleromitrula shiraiana

Scientific classification
- Kingdom: Fungi
- Division: Ascomycota
- Class: Leotiomycetes
- Order: Helotiales
- Family: Rutstroemiaceae
- Genus: Scleromitrula; S. Imai

Type species
- Scleromitrula shiraiana (Henn.) S. Imai

= Scleromitrula =

Genus of fungi

Scleromitrula is a genus of fungi within the Rutstroemiaceae family.
