= Coleophora dentiferoides =

Scientific classification
- Kingdom: Animalia
- Phylum: Arthropoda
- Class: Insecta
- Order: Lepidoptera
- Family: Coleophoridae
- Genus: Coleophora
- Species: C. dentiferoides

Binomial name
- Coleophora dentiferoides McDunnough, 1958

Species of moth

Coleophora dentiferoides is a moth of the family Coleophoridae. It is found in Canada, including Nova Scotia.

The larvae feed on the seeds of Juncus militaris. They create a tubular silken seed case.
