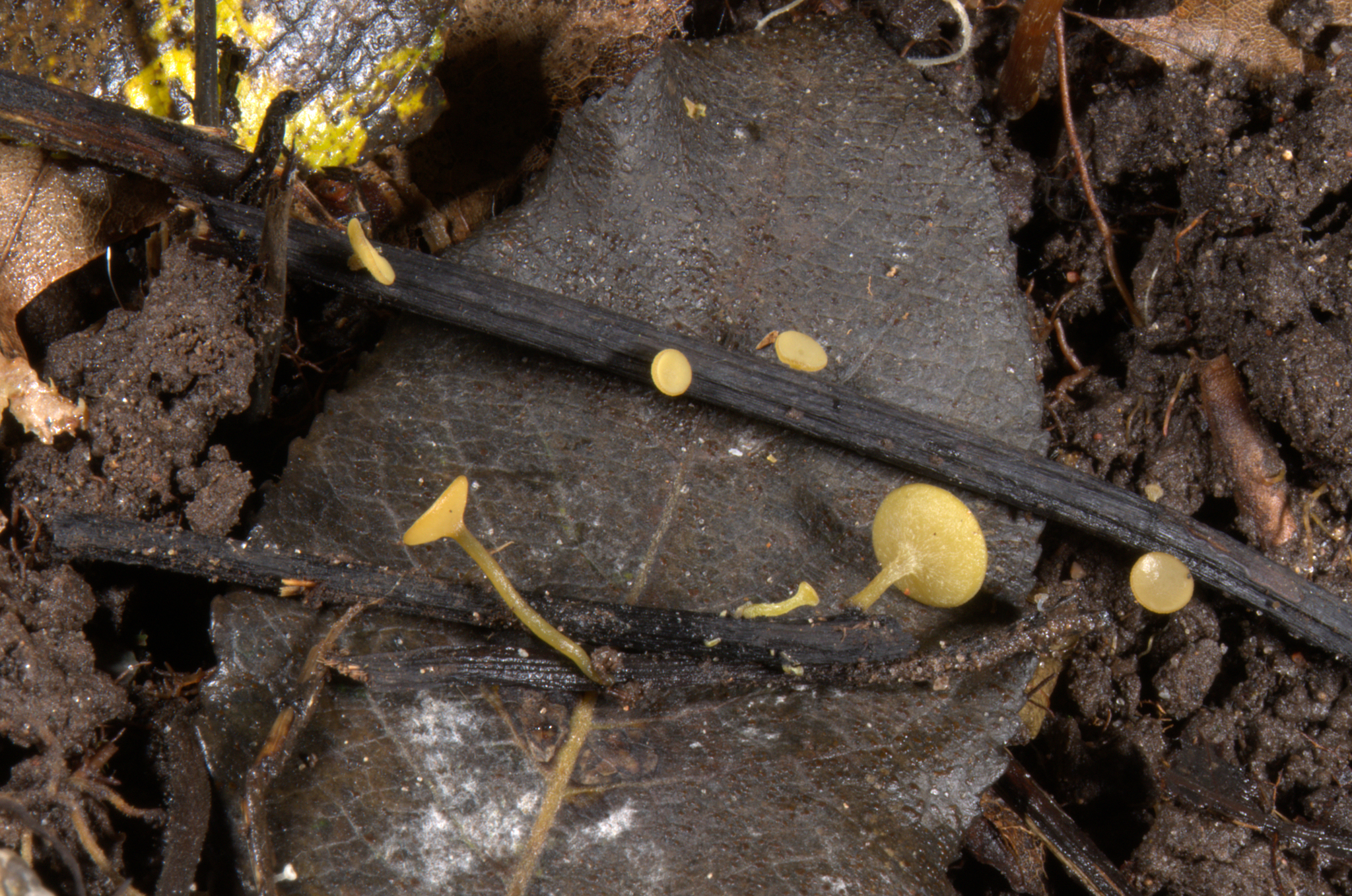
- Lanzia luteovirescens

Scientific classification
- Kingdom: Fungi
- Division: Ascomycota
- Class: Leotiomycetes
- Order: Helotiales
- Family: Rutstroemiaceae
- Genus: Lanzia; Sacc.

Type species
- Lanzia flavorufa (Sacc.) Sacc.

= Lanzia =

Genus of fungi

Lanzia is a genus of fungi within the family Rutstroemiaceae.

The genus name of Lanzia is in honour of Matteo Lanzi (1824-1908), who was an Italian doctor, botanist (Mycology and Algology) and diatom researcher. He worked as a lecturer at the University in Rome.

The genus was circumscribed by Pier Andrea Saccardo in Bot. Centralbl. vol.18 on pages 218 and 306 in 1884.

== Species ==
The following species are recognised in the genus Lanzia:

- Lanzia allantospora
- Lanzia antarctica
- Lanzia australis
- Lanzia blumenaviensis
- Lanzia cantareirensis
- Lanzia caryopsicola
- Lanzia castanopsidis
- Lanzia coracina
- Lanzia cuniculi
- Lanzia eburnea
- Lanzia equiseti
- Lanzia fibrilosa
- Lanzia flavoaurantia
- Lanzia flavorufa
- Lanzia glenii
- Lanzia guangxiensis
- Lanzia helotioides
- Lanzia huangshanica
- Lanzia kosciuszkoensis
- Lanzia longipes
- Lanzia luteovirescens
- Lanzia minuta
- Lanzia moniliformae
- Lanzia novae-zelandiae
- Lanzia ovispora
- Lanzia parasitica
- Lanzia pteridiicola
- Lanzia reticulata
- Lanzia sinensis
- Lanzia stellariae
- Lanzia thindii
- Lanzia ulmariae
- Lanzia velutinosa
- Lanzia viburni
