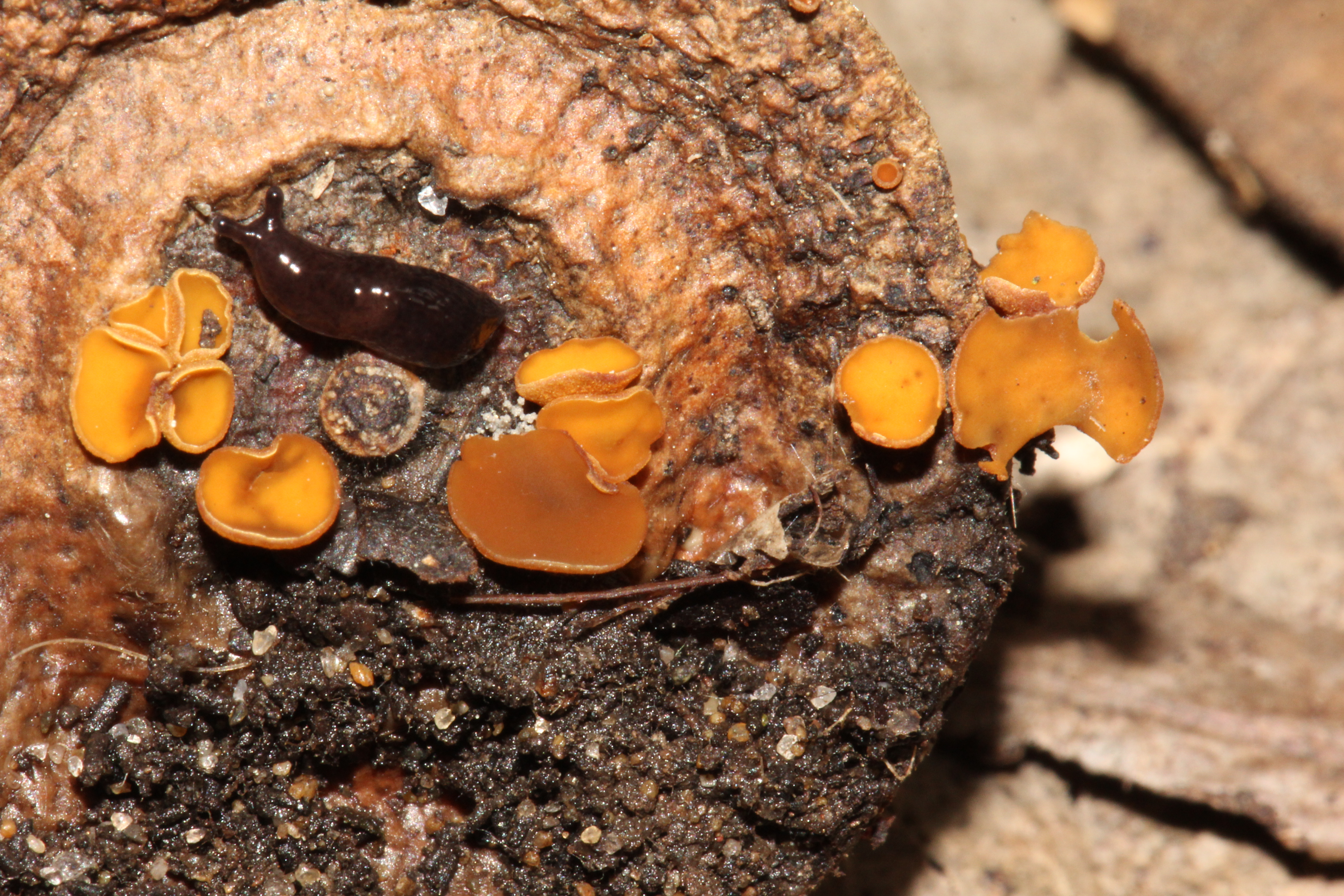
- A Rutstroemia species on a Eucalyptus seed pod

Scientific classification
- Kingdom: Fungi
- Division: Ascomycota
- Class: Leotiomycetes
- Order: Helotiales
- Family: Rutstroemiaceae
- Genus: Rutstroemia; P.Karst. (1871)

Type species
- Rutstroemia firma (Pers.) P.Karst. (1871)

= Rutstroemia =

Genus of fungi

Rutstroemia is a genus of fungi in the family Rutstroemiaceae. It was circumscribed by Petter Karsten in 1871.

The genus name of Rutstroemia is in honour of Carl Birger Rutström (1758–1826), who was a Swedish teacher, botanist and mycologist. Between 1794 and 1798, he worked at the Royal Academy of Turku in Åbo.

== Species ==
As accepted by Species Fungorum;

- Rutstroemia acutispora Le Gal (1959)
- Rutstroemia alba Velen. (1934)
- Rutstroemia allantospora R. Galán, Honrubia & J.T. Palmer (1988)
- Rutstroemia alni L. Rémy (1965)
- Rutstroemia alnobetulae Dougoud (2015)
- Rutstroemia articulata Velen. (1934)
- Rutstroemia asphodeli (Duvernoy & Maire) R. Galán & Matočec (2015)
- Rutstroemia aurantia Velen. (1934)
- Rutstroemia aurea Velen. (1934)
- Rutstroemia beaglensis Gamundí & Giaiotti (1995)
- Rutstroemia bertholletiae Dennis (1958)
- Rutstroemia bolaris (Batsch) Rehm (1893)
- Rutstroemia boliviana E.K. Cash (1958)
- Rutstroemia bufonia Velen. (1934)
- Rutstroemia bulgarioides (P. Karst.) P. Karst. (1871)
- Rutstroemia calopus (Fr.) Rehm (1893)
- Rutstroemia carbonicola Svrček (1979)
- Rutstroemia chamaemori L. Holm & K. Holm (1977)
- Rutstroemia conformata (P. Karst.) Nannf. (1942)
- Rutstroemia coracina (Durieu & Lév.) Dennis (1964)
- Rutstroemia corneri E.K. Cash (1958)
- Rutstroemia dabaensis W.Y. Zhuang (1997)
- Rutstroemia dzhapharovii Raitv. (1968)
- Rutstroemia elatina (Alb. & Schwein.) Rehm (1893)
- Rutstroemia espeletiae Dennis (1960)
- Rutstroemia firma (Pers.) P. Karst. (1871)
- Rutstroemia fruticeti Rehm (1893)
- Rutstroemia gallincola Velen. (1934)
- Rutstroemia gracilipes P. Karst. (1876)
- Rutstroemia henningsiana (Plöttn.) Dennis (1956)
- Rutstroemia hercynica (Kirschst.) Dennis (1962)
- Rutstroemia hirsuta Dennis (1959)
- Rutstroemia homocarpa P. Karst. (1871)
- Rutstroemia indica K.S. Thind & H. Singh (1971)
- Rutstroemia iridis-aphyllae Svrček (1975)
- Rutstroemia juglandis Raitv. (1964)
- Rutstroemia juniperi K. Holm & L. Holm (1977)
- Rutstroemia lateritia Velen. (1934)
- Rutstroemia leporina Ade (1923)
- Rutstroemia lindaviana (Kirschst.) Dennis (1960)
- Rutstroemia longiasca (Cavara) W.L. White (1941)
- Rutstroemia macilenta P. Karst. (1871)
- Rutstroemia majalis Velen. (1934)
- Rutstroemia maritima (Roberge ex Desm.) Dennis (1964)
- Rutstroemia megalospora (Speg.) Gamundí (1962)
- Rutstroemia microsperma (Speg.) Gamundí (1962)
- Rutstroemia microspora Velen. (1934)
- Rutstroemia nebulosa (Cooke) Kauffman & Kanouse (1929)
- Rutstroemia nerii Whetzel & W.L. White (1941)
- Rutstroemia niphogetonis Dennis (1960)
- Rutstroemia nothofagi Gamundí & Giaiotti (1995)
- Rutstroemia nummiformis (Pat.) Le Gal (1953)
- Rutstroemia oligospora Velen. (1934)
- Rutstroemia paludosa (E.K. Cash & R.W. Davidson) J.W. Groves & M.E. Elliott (1961)
- Rutstroemia petiolorum (Roberge ex Desm.) W.L. White (1941)
- Rutstroemia pilatii Velen. (1934)
- Rutstroemia plana D.M. Hend. (1970)
- Rutstroemia poluninii Linder (1941)
- Rutstroemia pruni-spinosae Whetzel & W.L. White (1941)
- Rutstroemia pseudosydowiana (Yan J. Zhao & Hosoya) Quijada & Baral (2020)
- Rutstroemia punicae B. Perić (2019)
- Rutstroemia quercina Velen. (1934)
- Rutstroemia remyi Fortoul & G. Nardi (1979)
- Rutstroemia rhenana (Kirschst.) Dennis (1971)
- Rutstroemia rivularis (P. Crouan & H. Crouan) Le Gal (1953)
- Rutstroemia rosarum Velen. (1934)
- Rutstroemia rubi Velen. (1934)
- Rutstroemia stagnalis Velen. (1934)
- Rutstroemia sulphurea Velen. (1934)
- Rutstroemia sydowiana (Rehm) W.L. White (1941)
- Rutstroemia symingtoniae K.S. Thind & H. Singh (1970)
- Rutstroemia tremellosa (Fuckel) Rehm (1893)
- Rutstroemia urceolus (Sacc.) W.L. White (1941)
- Rutstroemia vacini Velen. (1939)
- Rutstroemia venusta Svrček (1966)
- Rutstroemia violacea Rehm (1893)

Former species;

- R. amentacea (Balb.) P. Karst. (1871) = Ciboria amentacea Sclerotiniaceae
- R. americana (E.J. Durand) W.L. White (1941) = Ciboria americana Sclerotiniaceae
- R. baccarum J. Schröt. (1879) = Monilinia baccarum Sclerotiniaceae
- R. baeumleri (Rehm) Berthet (1964) = Ombrophila baeumleri Gelatinodiscaceae
- R. baeumleri (Rehm) Berthet (1965) = Ombrophila baeumleri Gelatinodiscaceae
- R. belisensis (Kanouse) Dennis (1964) = Lambertella belisensis
- R. caucus (Rebent.) W. Phillips (1887) = Ciboria caucus Sclerotiniaceae
- R. ciborioides (Fr.) P. Karst. (1887) = Hymenoscyphus ciborioides Helotiaceae
- R. ciborioides f. tenella P. Karst. (1887) = Sclerotinia tenella Sclerotiniaceae
- R. cuniculi (Boud.) M.E. Elliott (1967) = Lanzia cuniculi
- R. curreyana (Berk.) P. Karst. (1871) = Myriosclerotinia curreyana Sclerotiniaceae
- R. echinophila (Bull.) Höhn. (1917) = Lanzia echinophila
- R. echinophila var. corticola Bertault & Malençon (1977) = Lanzia echinophila
- R. fuscobrunnea (Pat. & Gaillard) Le Gal (1953) = Micropeziza castanea Pezizellaceae
- R. glandicola K.S. Thind & H. Singh (1972) = Lanzia glandicola
- R. guernisacii (P. Crouan & H. Crouan) Le Gal (1953) = Pachydisca guernisacii Helotiales
- R. hedwigiae Kirschst. (1906) = Ciboria hedwigiae Sclerotiniaceae
- R. johnstonii (Berk.) K. Holm & L. Holm (1977) = Dencoeliopsis johnstonii
- R. juncifida (Nyl.) C.F. Reed & E.R. Farr (1993) = Myriosclerotinia juncifida Sclerotiniaceae
- R. lanaripes Dennis (1958) = Lanzia lanaripes
- R. latispora K.S. Thind & Saini (1968) = Lambertella latispora
- R. longipes (Cooke & Peck) W.L. White (1941) = Lanzia longipes
- R. luteovirescens (Roberge ex Desm.) W.L. White (1941) = Lanzia luteovirescens
- R. macrospora (Peck) Kanouse (1940) = Tatraea macrospora Helotiaceae
- R. macrospora f. gigaspora Korf (1959) = Tatraea macrospora Helotiaceae
- R. nervisequa (J. Schröt.) W.L. White (1941) = Rutstroemia conformata
- R. pinetorum (Fuckel) Svrček (1974) = Moellerodiscus pinetorum Sclerotiniaceae
- R. pruni-serotinae Whetzel & W.L. White (1941) = Lanzia pruni-serotinae
- R. renispora (Ellis) W.L. White (1941) = Hymenoscyphus renisporus Helotiaceae
- R. sepiacea K.S. Thind, E.K. Cash & Pr. Singh (1961) = Poculum sepiaceum
- R. setulata (Dearn. & House) W.L. White (1941) = Torrendiella setulata
- R. terrestris Velen. (1934) = Phaeohelotium terrestre Helotiaceae
- R. tiliacea (Fr.) K. Holm & L. Holm (1977) = Encoelia tiliacea Cenangiaceae
- R. tuberosa (Bull.) P. Karst. (1871) = Dumontinia tuberosa Sclerotiniaceae
- R. viarum Starbäck (1898) = Ciboria viarum Sclerotiniaceae

Note: If no family shown at end of item, assume Rutstroemiaceae
