= Caccobius =

Caccobius may refer to:

- Caccobius (beetle), a genus of beetles in the family Scarabaeidae
- Caccobius (fungus), a genus of fungi in the family Thelebolaceae
