= Poculum =

Scientific classification
- Kingdom: Fungi
- Division: Ascomycota
- Class: Leotiomycetes
- Order: Helotiales
- Family: Rutstroemiaceae
- Genus: Poculum; Velen.

Type species
- Poculum ruborum Velen.

Genus of fungi

Poculum is a genus of fungi within the Rutstroemiaceae family.
