= Ochotrichobolus =

Scientific classification
- Kingdom: Fungi
- Division: Ascomycota
- Class: Leotiomycetes
- Order: Thelebolales
- Family: Thelebolaceae
- Genus: Ochotrichobolus; Kimbr. & Korf

Type species
- Ochotrichobolus polysporus Kimbr. & Korf

Genus of fungi

Ochotrichobolus is a genus of fungi in the Thelebolaceae family. This is a monotypic genus, containing the single species Ochotrichobolus polysporus.
