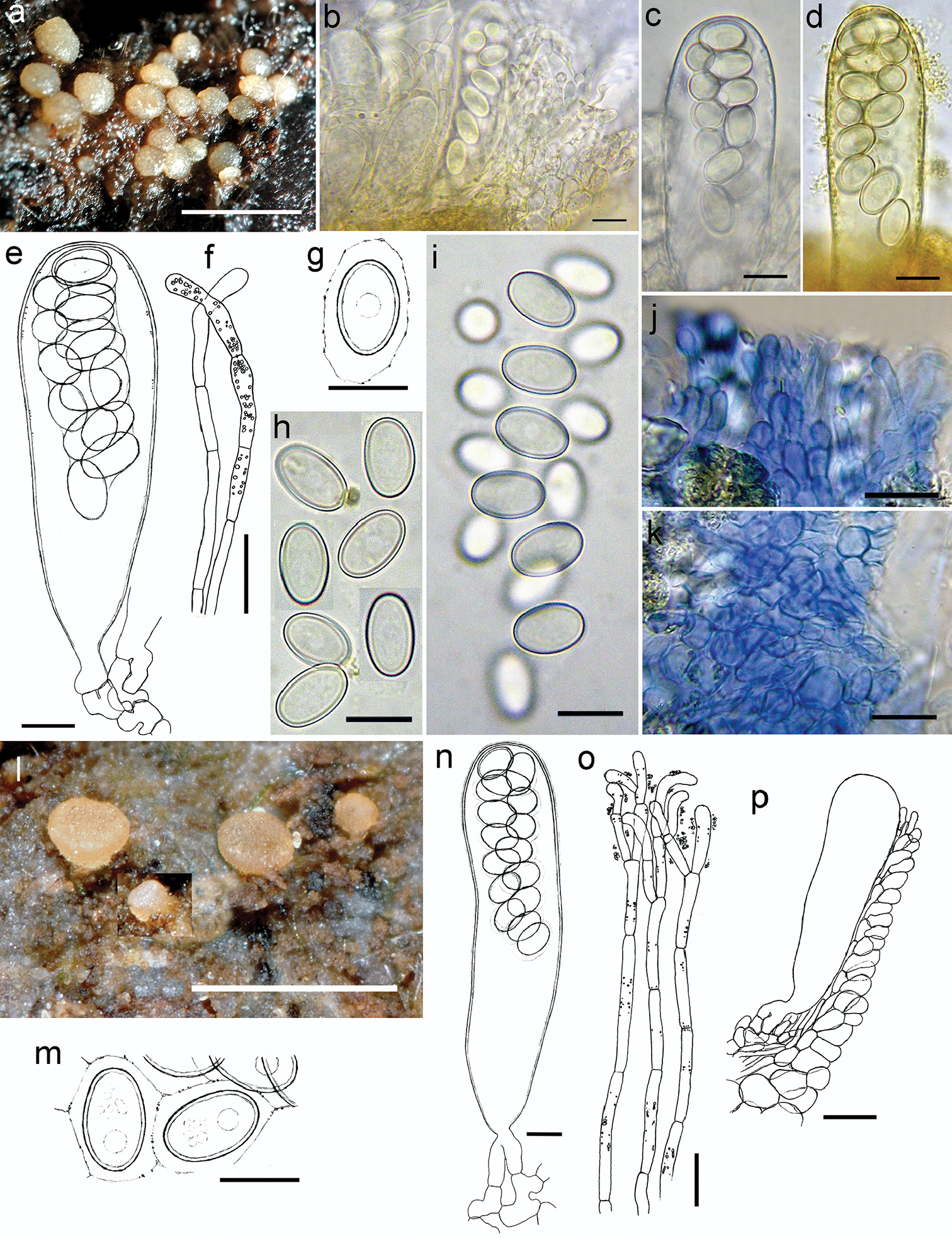
- Coprotus sexdecimsporus

Scientific classification
- Kingdom: Fungi
- Division: Ascomycota
- Class: Leotiomycetes
- Order: Thelebolales
- Family: Thelebolaceae
- Genus: Coprotus; Korf ex Korf & Kimbr. (1967)

Type species
- Coprotus sexdecimsporus (P.Crouan & H.Crouan) Kimbr. & Korf (1967)

= Coprotus =

Genus of fungi

Coprotus is a genus of dung-inhabiting "cup fungi"; it has been assigned to the family Thelebolaceae, though doubt has subsequently been thrown on that placement.

== Species ==
- Coprotus albidus
- Coprotus arduennensis
- Coprotus argenteus
- Coprotus aurora
- Coprotus baeosporus
- Coprotus dextrinoideus
- Coprotus dhofarensis
- Coprotus disculus
- Coprotus duplus
- Coprotus glaucellus
- Coprotus granuliformis
- Coprotus lacteus
- Coprotus leucopocillum
- Coprotus luteus
- Coprotus marginatus
- Coprotus niveus
- Coprotus ochraceus
- Coprotus rhyparobioides
- Coprotus sarangpurensis
- Coprotus sexdecimsporus
- Coprotus sphaerosporus
- Coprotus trichosuri
- Coprotus uncinatus
- Coprotus vicinus
- Coprotus winteri
