= Loramycetaceae =

Scientific classification
- Kingdom: Fungi
- Division: Ascomycota
- Class: Leotiomycetes
- Order: Helotiales
- Family: Loramycetaceae; Dennis ex Digby & Goos

Type genus
- Loramyces W. Weston

Species
- Loramyces juncicola W. Weston; Loramyces macrosporus Ingold & B. Chapm.

Family of fungi

The Loramycetaceae are a family of fungi in the Ascomycota, class Leotiomycetes. This is a monotypic taxon, containing the single genus Loramyces; the genus contains two aquatic species, L. juncicola, named by American mycologist William H. Weston in 1929, and L. macrosporus, first described by C.T. Ingold and B. Chapman in 1952.

== Taxonomy ==
In his 1929 publication, Weston never designated an order or family for the genus Loramyces, mentioning difficulties resolving its taxonomic placement. The genus has been placed historically in several different families in the outdated Sphaeriales order, including the Halosphaeriaceae, the Sphaeriaceae, the Loramycetaceae, and the Trichosphaeriaceae. The taxonomy of the genus was reevaluated in 1987, and was named by S. Digby and R.D. Goos in 1987. Species in the family are found in North America and Europe, where they grow in a saprobic fashion on submerged, decaying plant tissue.

== Description ==
Members of the family Loramycetaceae lack stromata, the compact mass of mycelium (with or without host tissue) that supports fruit bodies or in which fruiting bodies are produced. The ascomata, which are formed within a gelatinous matrix, are deeply cup-shaped, almost like a perithecium. The outer tissue layer of the ascomata is thin-walled and translucent. The ascospores are 2-septate, translucent, and have a long basal cellular appendage with a gelatinous sheath. This sheath is thought to play the role of a "flotation mechanism", and ultimately give the ascospores a greater chance to become attached to the upper part of the host plant.

The black ascomata of Loramyces juncicola reach diameters of roughly 1.5–2 mm; they are shaped like flattened spheres when mature. Atop the ascomata are openings (ostioles) that are 20–30 μm wide and that protrude from the surface. After the ascomata have released their grey-colored ascospores, the top portion typically disintegrates leaving a partially closed cup. The spores of this species are hyaline, thin-walled, and spindle-shaped with dimensions of 17–22 μm long and 4–6 μm wide. The ascospores, which are surrounded by a gelatinous matrix, are divided into two cells by a septa. The apical cell has a bluntly rounded point, while the basal cell is thin and thread-like, bearing a slightly curved tail-like appendage.

== Habitat ==
The species Loramyces juncicola was originally found on growing dead, partly softened stems of Juncus militaris that were submerged in fresh water to a depth of a few inches to as much as a few feet in a pond on Nashawena Island, off the Massachusetts coast. The habitat, situated a short distance inland, was buffered from the motion of waves by a thick growth of the Juncus plants that also partially shaded the water. It is known that warmer water inhibits the growth of ascomata, but it is not clear whether this is due to inhibition of the Loramyces fungus, or growth enhancement of bacteria that compete for nutrients. The gel-like substance surrounded the fruit bodies probably helps prevent the fungus from drying out when exposed to air by sinking water levels.
