= Ramgea =

Scientific classification
- Kingdom: Fungi
- Division: Ascomycota
- Class: Leotiomycetes
- Order: Thelebolales
- Family: Thelebolaceae
- Genus: Ramgea; Brumm.

Type species
- Ramgea annulispora

Genus of fungi

Ramgea is a genus of fungi in the Thelebolaceae family. This is a monotypic genus, containing the single species Ramgea annulispora.
