= Cleistothelebolus =

Scientific classification
- Kingdom: Fungi
- Division: Ascomycota
- Class: Leotiomycetes
- Order: Thelebolales
- Family: Thelebolaceae
- Genus: Cleistothelebolus; Malloch & Cain (1971)
- Species: C. nipigonensis

Binomial name
- Cleistothelebolus nipigonensis Malloch & Cain (1971)

Synonyms
- Hyphozyma variabilis de Hoog & M.T.Sm. (1981); Hyphozyma variabilis var. odora de Hoog & M.T.Sm. (1981)

Single-species fungal genus

Cleistothelebolus is a single-species fungal genus the family Thelebolaceae. It contains the single species Cleistothelebolus nipigonensis. Both the species and genus were described as new in 1971 by David Warren Malloch and Roy Franklin Cain. The type specimen was collected growing on dog dung in Ontario.
