= Dennisiopsis =

Scientific classification
- Kingdom: Fungi
- Division: Ascomycota
- Class: Leotiomycetes
- Order: Thelebolales
- Family: Thelebolaceae
- Genus: Dennisiopsis; Subram. & Chandras.

Type species
- Dennisiopsis octospora Subram. & Chandrash.

Genus of fungi

Dennisiopsis is a genus of fungi in the Thelebolaceae family.

The genus name of Dennisiopsis is in honour of Richard William George Dennis (1910 - 2003), British botanist (mycology) and plant pathologist.

The genus was circumscribed by Chirayathumadom Venkatachalier Subramanian and K.V. Chandrashekara in Kew Bull. Vol.31 (Issue 3) on page 639 in 1977.
