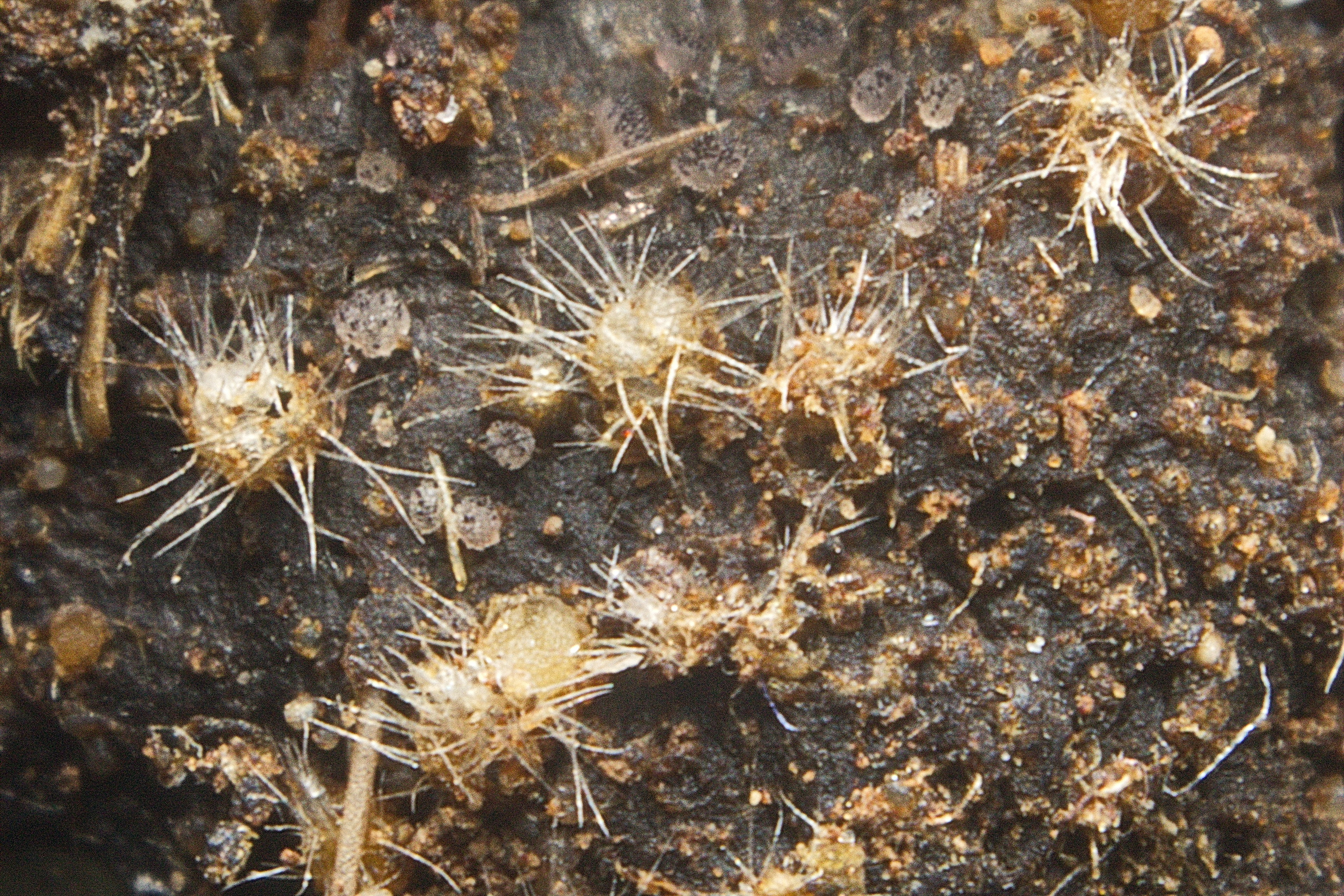
- Trichobolus zukalii

Scientific classification
- Kingdom: Fungi
- Division: Ascomycota
- Class: Leotiomycetes
- Order: Thelebolales
- Family: Thelebolaceae
- Genus: Trichobolus (Sacc.) Kimbr. & Cain

Type species
- Trichobolus zukalii (Heimerl) Kimbr.

= Trichobolus =

Genus of fungi

Trichobolus is a genus of fungi in the Thelebolaceae family.

== Species ==
The genus Trichobolus contains six species:

- Trichobolus dextrinoideosetosus Doveri
- Trichobolus octosporus J.C.Krug
- Trichobolus pilosus (J.Schröt.) Kimbr.
- Trichobolus sphaerosporus Kimbr.
- Trichobolus vanbrummelenii Valldos. & Guarro
- Trichobolus zukalii (Heimerl) Kimbr.
