= Coprotiella =

Scientific classification
- Kingdom: Fungi
- Division: Ascomycota
- Class: Leotiomycetes
- Order: Thelebolales
- Family: Thelebolaceae
- Genus: Coprotiella; Jeng & J.C. Krug

Type species
- Coprotiella gongylospora Jeng & J.C. Krug

Genus of fungi

Coprotiella is a genus of fungi in the Thelebolaceae family. This is a monotypic genus, containing the single species Coprotiella gongylospora.
