= Antarctomyces =

Scientific classification
- Domain: Eukaryota
- Kingdom: Fungi
- Division: Ascomycota
- Class: Leotiomycetes
- Order: Thelebolales
- Family: Thelebolaceae
- Genus: Antarctomyces; Stchigel & Guarro

Type species
- Antarctomyces psychotrophicus Stchigel & Guarro

Genus of fungi

Antarctomyces is a genus of fungi in the Thelebolaceae family. This is a monotypic genus, containing the single species Antarctomyces psychotrophicus.
