= Pseudascozonus =

Scientific classification
- Kingdom: Fungi
- Division: Ascomycota
- Class: Leotiomycetes
- Order: Thelebolales
- Family: Thelebolaceae
- Genus: Pseudascozonus; Brumm.

Type species
- Pseudascozonus racemosporus Brumm.

Genus of fungi

Pseudascozonus is a genus of fungi in the Thelebolaceae family. This is a monotypic genus, containing the single species Pseudascozonus racemosporus.
