= Coprobolus =

Scientific classification
- Kingdom: Fungi
- Division: Ascomycota
- Class: Leotiomycetes
- Order: Thelebolales
- Family: Thelebolaceae
- Genus: Coprobolus; Cain & Kimbr. (1970)

Type species
- Coprobolus poculiformis Cain & Kimbr. (1970)

Genus of fungi

Coprobolus is a fungal genus in the family Thelebolaceae. It is a monotypic genus, containing the single species Coprobolus poculiformis. It was first described scientifically in 1970. C. poculiformis has hyaline ellipsoid ascospores and multispored asci that split open at the apex. It was found on rabbit dung.
