= Mycoarctium =

Scientific classification
- Kingdom: Fungi
- Division: Ascomycota
- Class: Leotiomycetes
- Order: Thelebolales
- Family: Thelebolaceae
- Genus: Mycoarctium; K. Jain & Cain

Type species
- Mycoarctium ciliatum K.P. Jain & Cain

Genus of fungi

Mycoarctium is a genus of fungi in the Thelebolaceae family.
