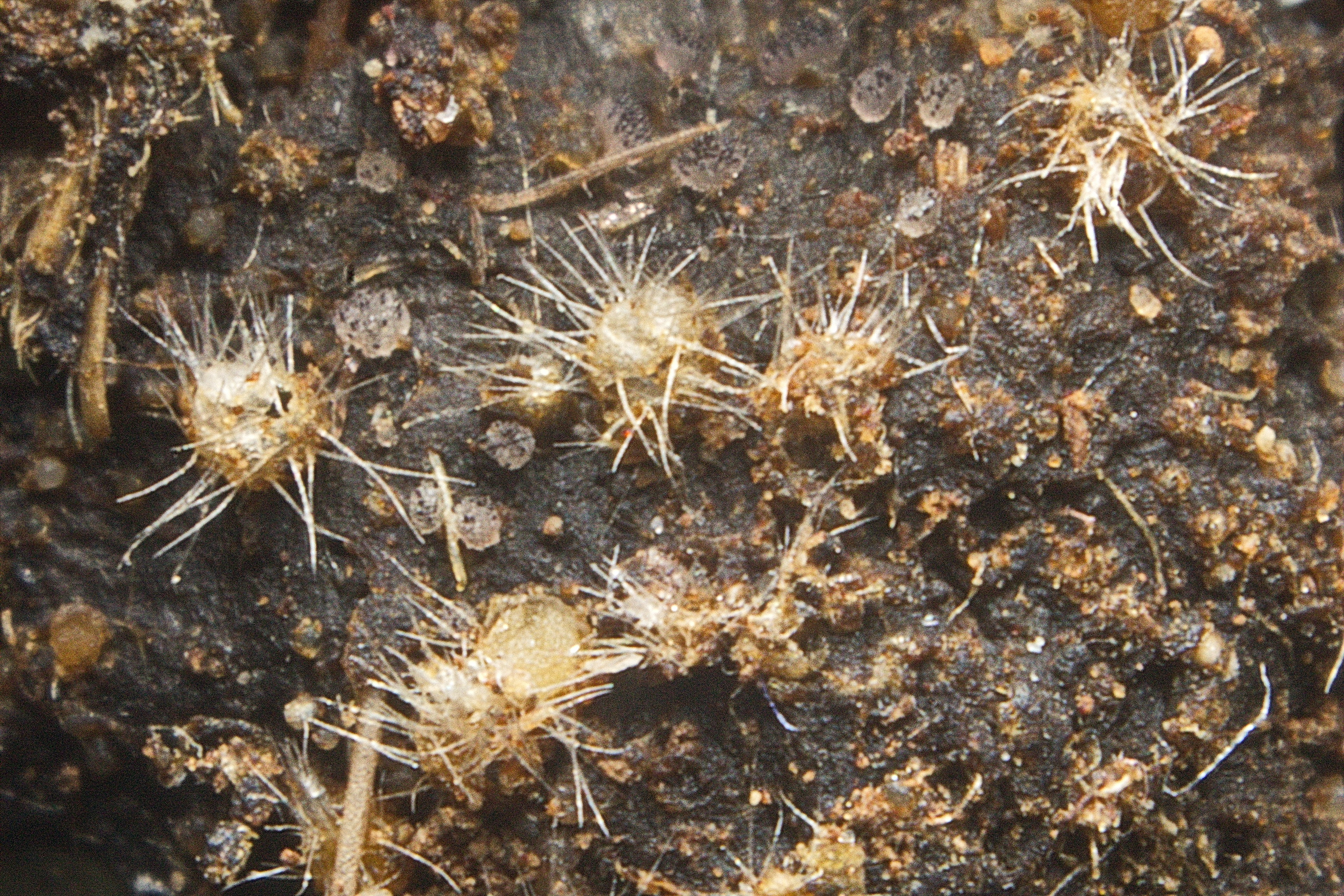
- Trichobolus zukalii

Scientific classification
- Kingdom: Fungi
- Division: Ascomycota
- Class: Leotiomycetes
- Subclass: Leotiomycetidae
- Order: Thelebolales; P.F.Cannon (2001)
- Family: Thelebolaceae; Eckblad (1968)

Genera
- See text

= Thelebolales =

Order of fungi

The Thelebolales are an order of the class Leotiomycetes within the division Ascomycota. It contains the single family Thelebolaceae, circumscribed in 1968 by Norwegian mycologist Finn-Egil Eckblad.

== Genera ==
The following 15 genera are included in the Thelebolaceae, according to the 2007 Outline of Ascomycota:

- Antarctomyces
- Ascophanus
- Ascozonus
- Caccobius
- Cleistothelebolus
- Coprobolus
- Coprotiella
- Coprotus
- Dennisiopsis
- Leptokalpion
- Mycoarctium
- Ochotrichobolus
- Pseudascozonus
- Ramgea
- Thelebolus
- Trichobolus
