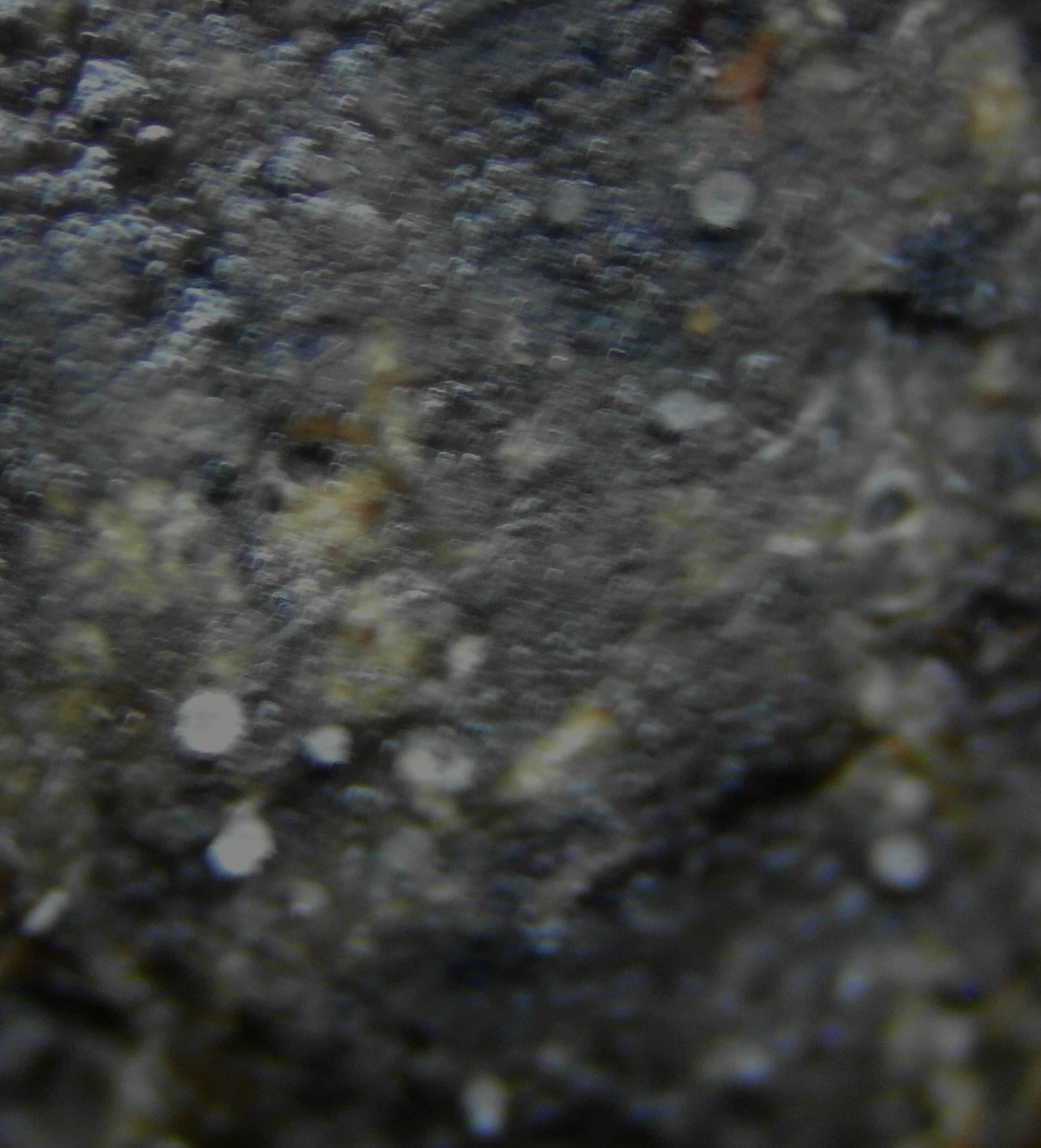
- Ascozonus woolhopensis on fox dung

Scientific classification
- Kingdom: Fungi
- Division: Ascomycota
- Class: Leotiomycetes
- Order: Thelebolales
- Family: Thelebolaceae
- Genus: Ascozonus (Renny) E.C. Hansen

Type species
- Ascozonus cunicularius (Boud.) Marchal

= Ascozonus =

Genus of fungi

Ascozonus is a genus of fungi in the Thelebolaceae family.
