= Leptokalpion =

Scientific classification
- Kingdom: Fungi
- Division: Ascomycota
- Class: Leotiomycetes
- Order: Thelebolales
- Family: Thelebolaceae
- Genus: Leptokalpion; Brumm.

Type species
- Leptokalpion albicans Brumm.

Genus of fungi

Leptokalpion is a genus of fungi in the Thelebolaceae family. This is a monotypic genus, containing the single species Leptokalpion albicans. It was first discovered in Thailand in 1977.
