= Caccobius minusculus =

Scientific classification
- Kingdom: Fungi
- Division: Ascomycota
- Class: Leotiomycetes
- Order: Thelebolales
- Family: Thelebolaceae
- Genus: Caccobius; Kimbr.
- Species: C. minusculus

Binomial name
- Caccobius minusculus Kimbr.

Genus of fungi

Caccobius is a genus of fungi in the Thelebolaceae family. This is a monotypic genus, containing the single species Caccobius minusculus.
