= Ascocorticium =

Scientific classification
- Kingdom: Fungi
- Division: Ascomycota
- Class: Leotiomycetes
- Order: Helotiales
- Family: Ascocorticiaceae; J.Schröt. (1893)
- Genus: Ascocorticium; Bref. (1891)

Family of fungi

The Ascocorticiaceae are a family of fungi in the Ascomycota, class Leotiomycetes. This is a monotypic taxon, containing the single genus Ascocorticium. The family was first described by Joseph Schröter in 1893. Species in this family have a widespread distribution in temperate locales, where they grow saprobically, often on the bark of conifers.
