= Medeolaria =

Scientific classification
- Kingdom: Fungi
- Division: Ascomycota
- Class: Leotiomycetes
- Order: Medeolariales; Korf
- Family: Medeolariaceae; Korf
- Genus: Medeolaria; Thaxt.
- Species: M. farlowii

Binomial name
- Medeolaria farlowii Thaxt.

Genus of fungi

The Medeolariales are an order of the class Leotiomycetes within the phylum Ascomycota. The order is monotypic, containing the single family Medeolariaceae, which in turn contains the single genus Medeolaria that contains the species Medeolaria farlowii, described by Thaxter in 1922.
