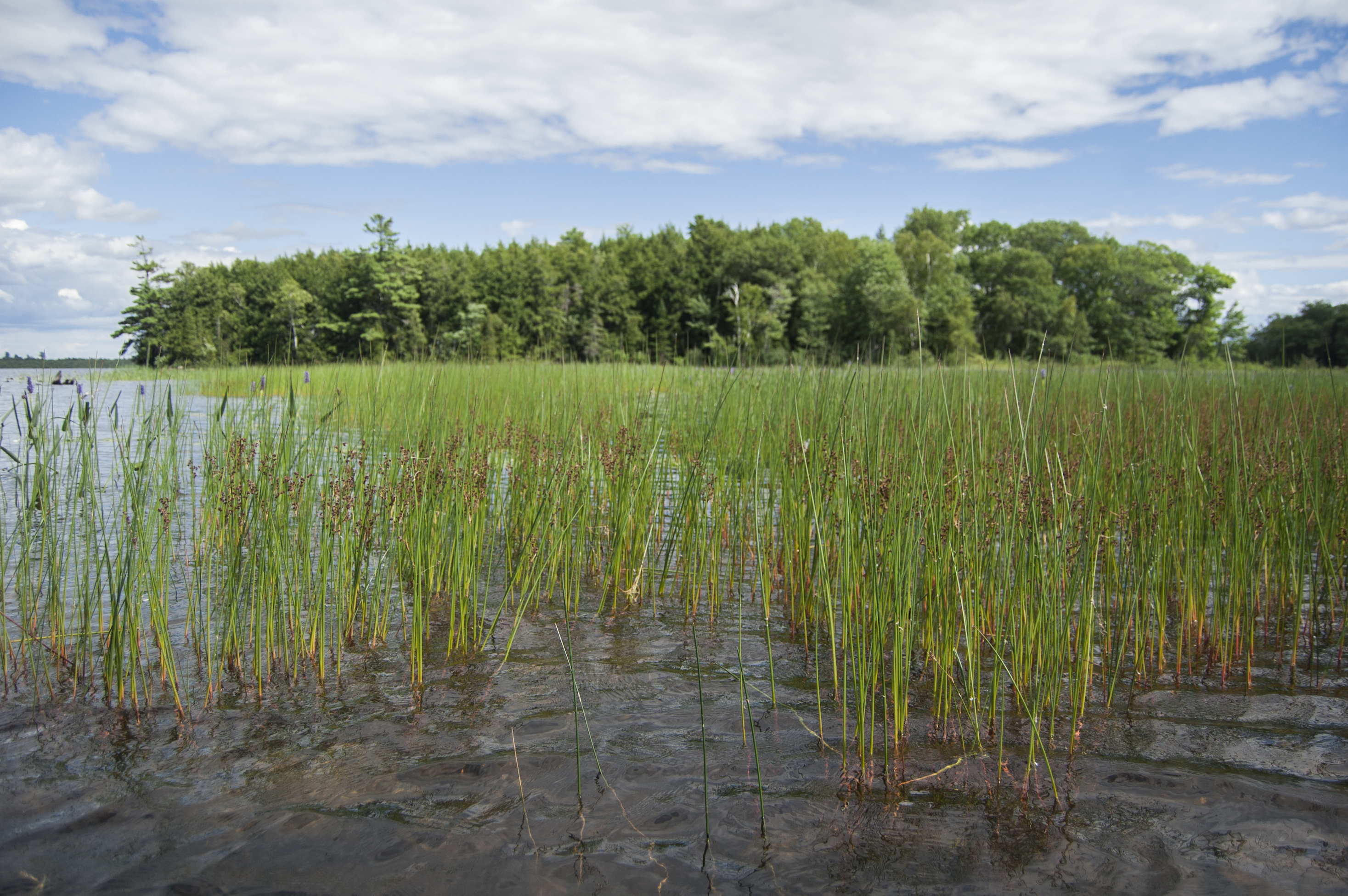
- In Pushaw Lake, Maine
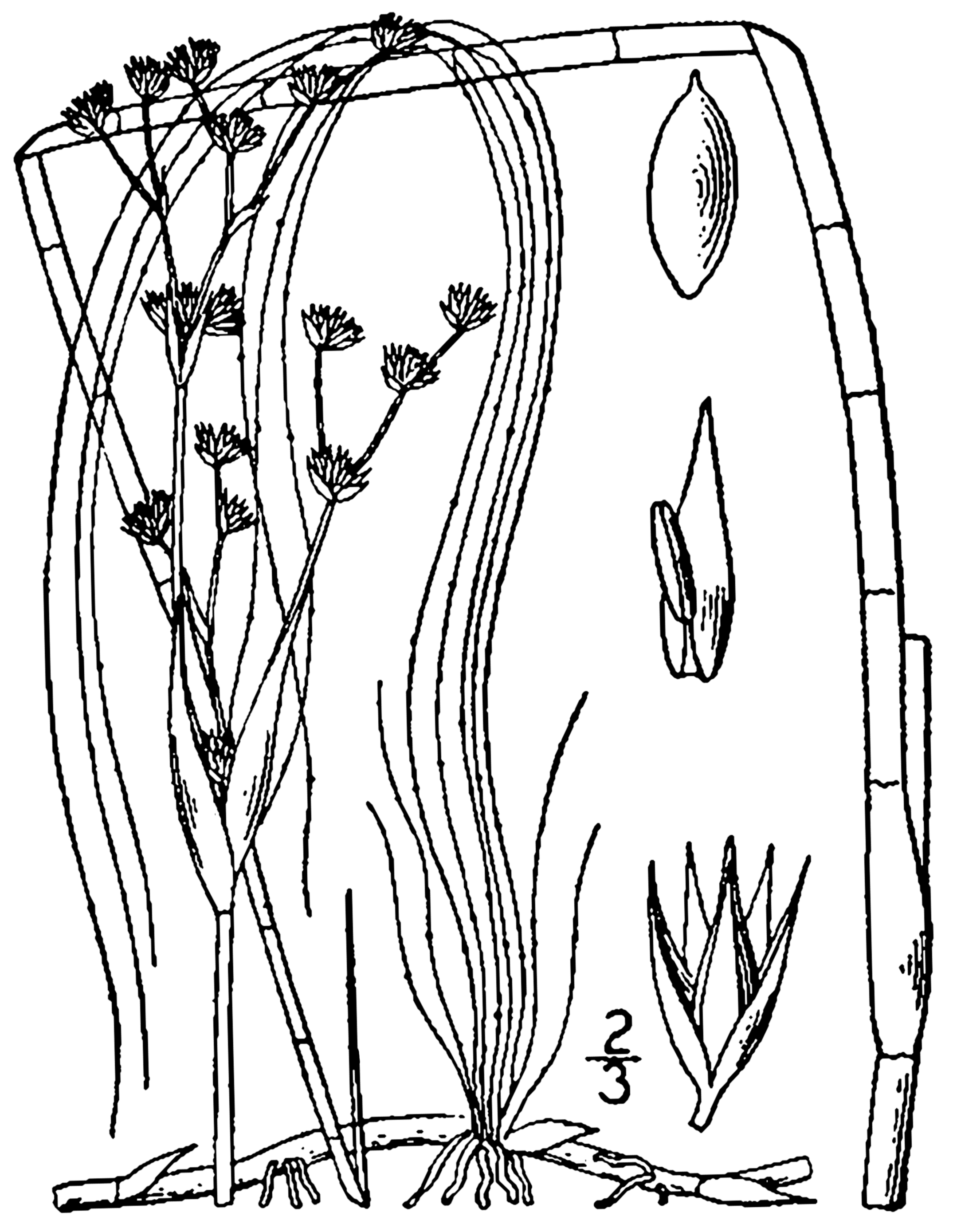
- Botanical illustration

Conservation status
- Least Concern (IUCN 3.1)

Scientific classification
- Kingdom: Plantae
- Clade: Tracheophytes
- Clade: Angiosperms
- Clade: Monocots
- Clade: Commelinids
- Order: Poales
- Family: Juncaceae
- Genus: Juncus
- Species: J. militaris

Binomial name
- Juncus militaris Bigelow

Synonyms
- Juncus militaris f. bifrons Fernald; Juncus militaris f. subnudus Fernald; Tristemon stellatus Raf.; Tristemon stellatus var. bigelowii Raf.; Tristemon stellatus var. paradoxus Raf.

= Juncus militaris =

Species of plant

Juncus militaris, the bayonet rush, is a species of flowering plant in the family Juncaceae, native to eastern Canada and the eastern United States. A perennial, it is found in shallow lakes and slow-moving rivers, on a variety of substrates; sand, silt, and muck.
