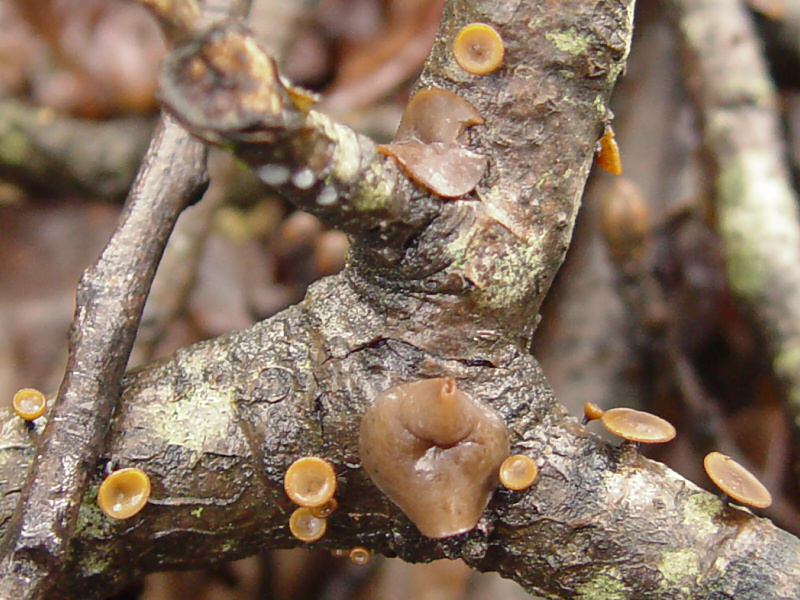
- Rutstroemia firma

Scientific classification
- Kingdom: Fungi
- Division: Ascomycota
- Class: Leotiomycetes
- Order: Helotiales
- Family: Rutstroemiaceae; Holst-Jensen, L.M. Koehn & T.Schmach. (1997)

Genera
- Dicephalospora; Lambertella; Lanzia; Poculum; Rutstroemia; Scleromitrula

= Rutstroemiaceae =

Family of fungi

Rutstroemiaceae is a family of fungi in the order Helotiales. Species in this family have a cosmopolitan distribution, especially in temperate areas.
