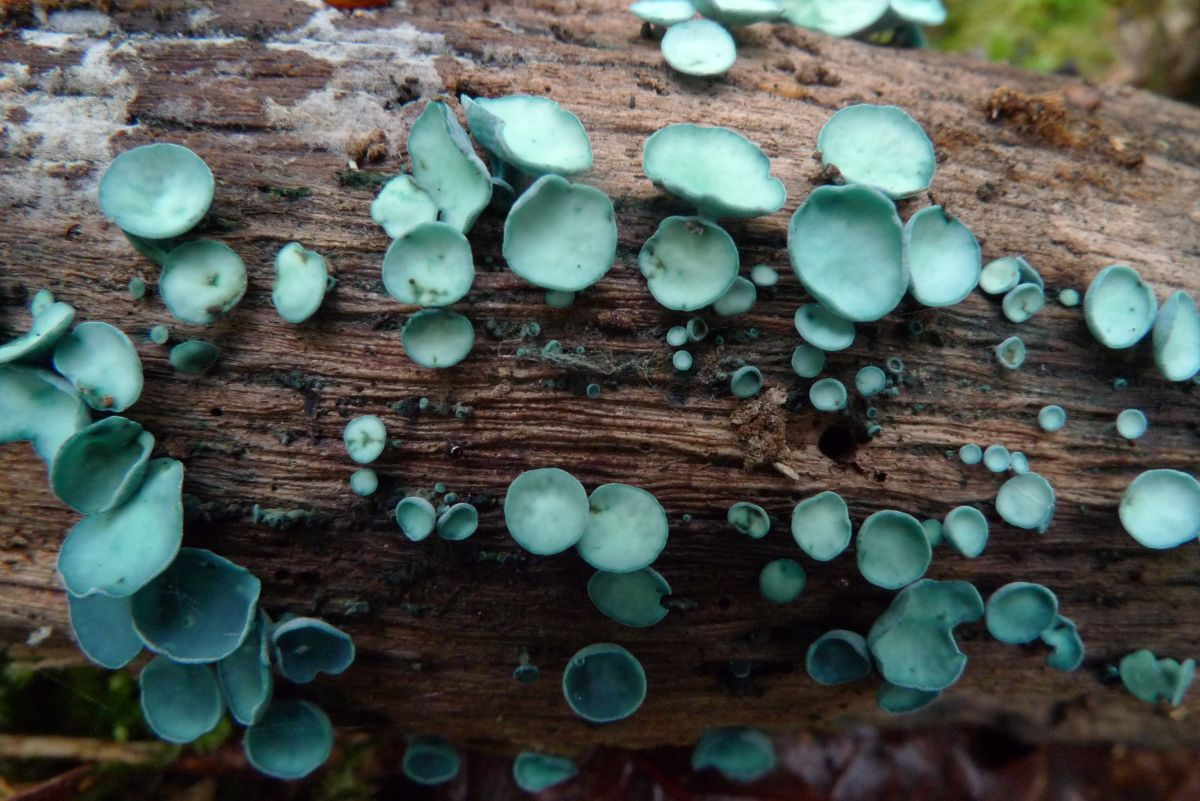
- Chlorociboria (Chlorociboriaceae)

Scientific classification
- Kingdom: Fungi
- Division: Ascomycota
- Class: Leotiomycetes
- Subclass: Leotiomycetidae
- Order: Helotiales; Nannf. ex Korf & Lizon (2000)

Families
- See text

= Helotiales =

Order of fungi

Helotiales is an order of the class Leotiomycetes within the division Ascomycota. The taxonomy within Helotiales has been debated. It has expanded significantly as genomic techniques for taxonomical identification have become more commonly used. As of February 2020, the order is estimated to contain 30 accepted families, 519 genera, and 6266 species.

Helotiales is the largest order of non-stromatic discomycetes that usually, but not always, have brightly coloured apothecia. Many members of the family have obviously cup-shaped ascomata with little or no stipes. They are usually found fruiting on coarse or large wood debris as well as on other organic matter. Part of these discomycetes are limited to a specific host range, this goes as far as to not just being limited to one particular plant, additionally some species need a particular part of that plant.

== Description ==
- Helotiales is distinguished by its disc or cup-shaped apothecia.
- Its asci are only slightly thickened in contrast to other Leotiomycetes
- Most Helotiales species live as saprobes on soil humus, dead logs, manure and other organic matter.
- The order includes most fungi that engage in ericoid mycorrhiza, including Rhizoscyphus ericae, Meliniomyces species and Cairneyella variabilis.
- The order contains some of the most severe plant pathogens such as Monilinia fructicola (brown rot on stone fruits), Sclerotinia sclerotiorum (lettuce drop and other diseases), Diplocarpon rosae (black spot of roses), Sclerotium cepivorum (soft rot of onions) and Botrytis cinerea.

== Families ==
- Amicodiscaceae
- Arachnopezizaceae
- Bryoglossaceae
- Cenangiaceae
- Chlorociboriaceae
- Chlorospleniaceae
- Chrysodiscaceae
- Dermateaceae
- Discinellaceae
- Drepanopezizaceae
- Erysiphaceae
- Gelatinodiscaceae
- Godroniaceae
- Hamatocanthoscyphaceae
- Helotiaceae
- Heterosphaeriaceae
- Hyaloscyphaceae
- Hydrocinaceae
- Lachnaceae
- Loramycetaceae
- Mitrulaceae
- Mollisiaceae
- Myxotrichaceae
- Neolauriomycetaceae
- Pleuroascaceae
- Ploettnerulaceae
- Rutstroemiaceae
- Sclerotiniaceae
- Solenopeziaceae
- Tympanidaceae
- Vibrisseaceae

== Disputed or previously included families ==
- Amorphothecaceae - Kirk (2008) assigned to Helotiales, but it is sometimes still considered incertae sedis.
- Ascocorticiaceae - reclassified under order Medeolariales
- Hemiphacidiaceae - Merged with Cenangiaceae in the 2010s.
- Phacidiaceae (also known as Bulgariaceae) - reclassified under order Phacidiales
- Vandijckellaceae - identified by Crous et al. (2017), not widely accepted.
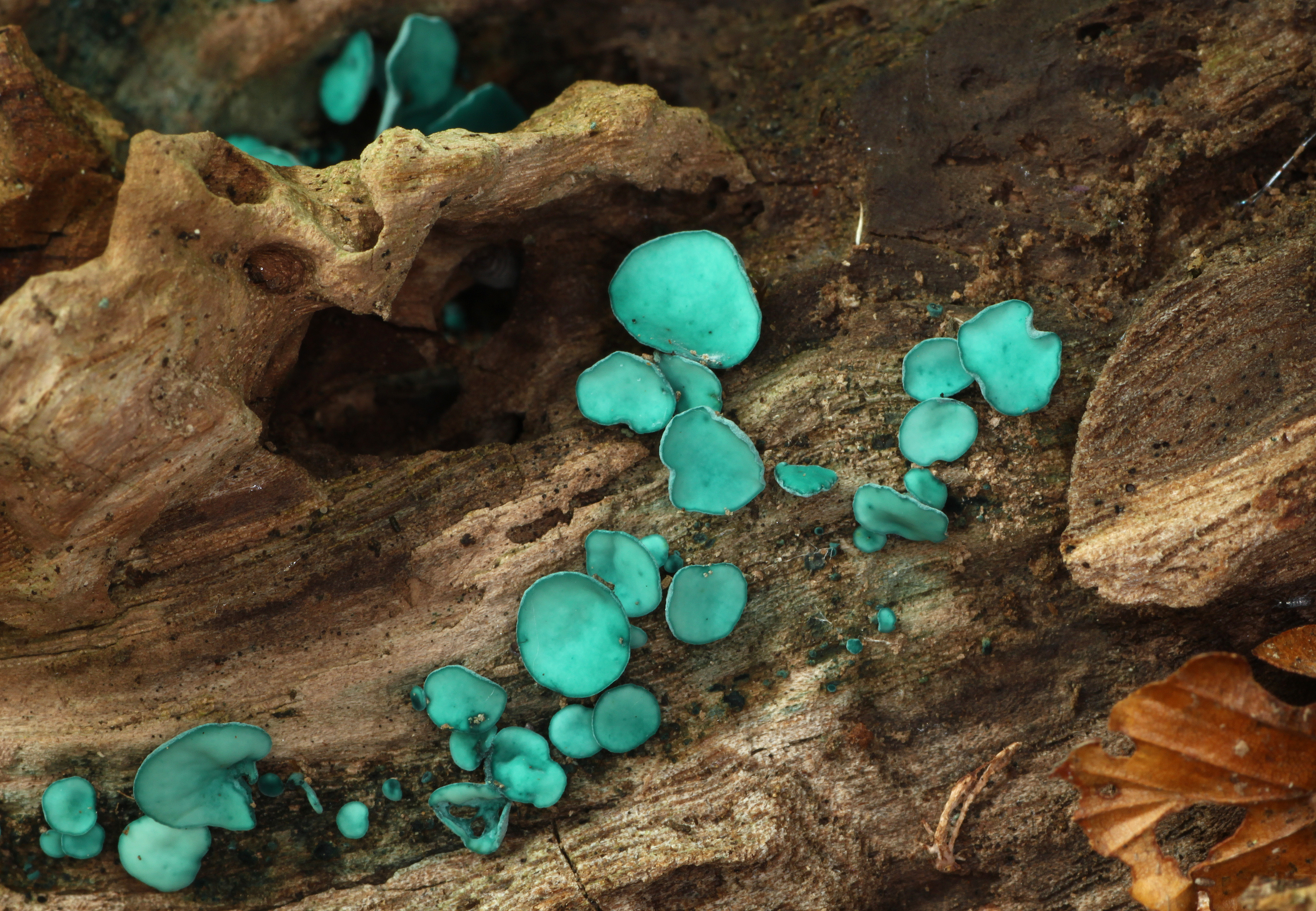
Green elfcup or green wood cup Chlorociboria aeruginascens, family: Chlorociboriaceae
(photo: Holger Krisp)

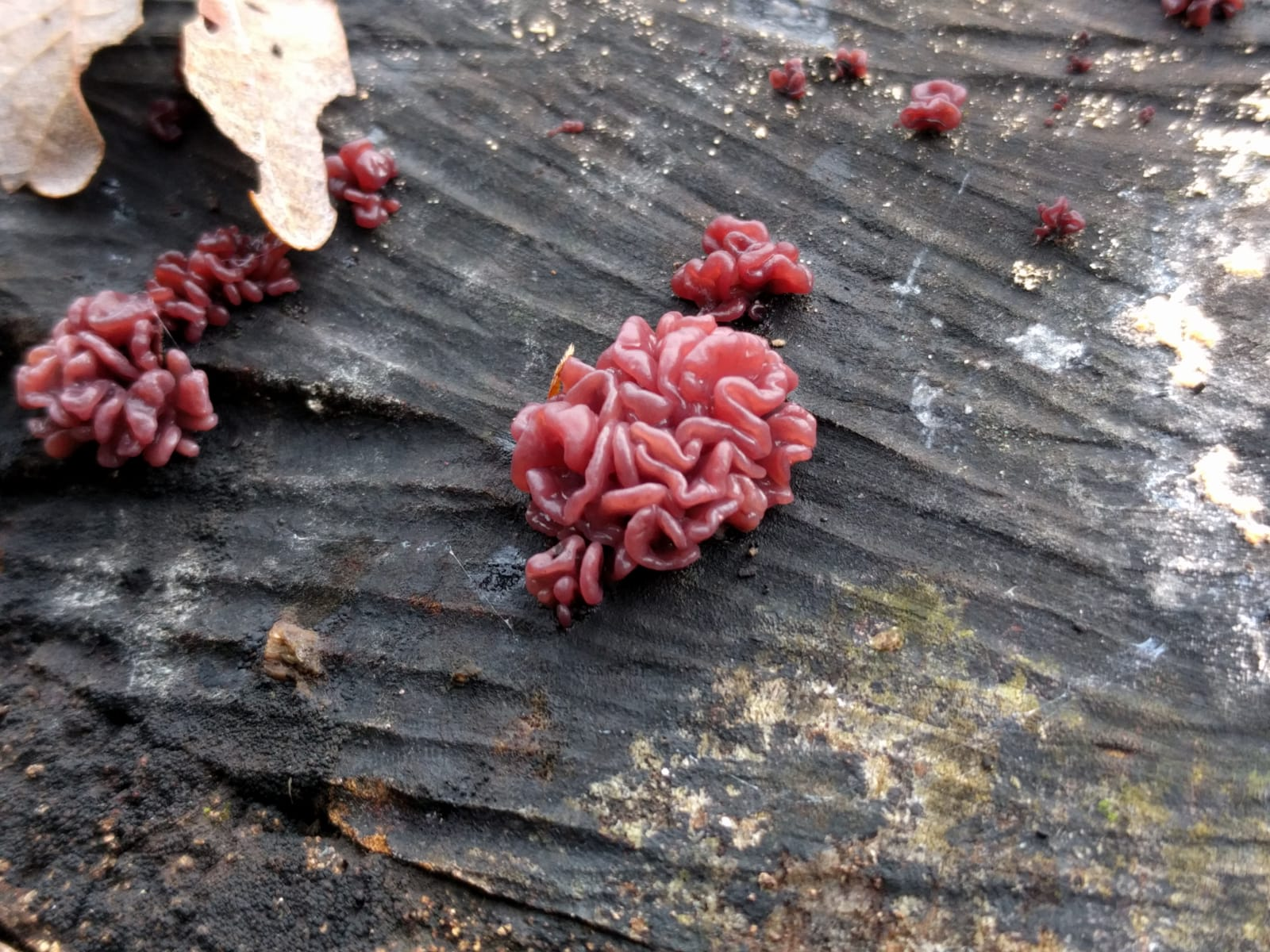
Ascocoryne, family: Helotiaceae

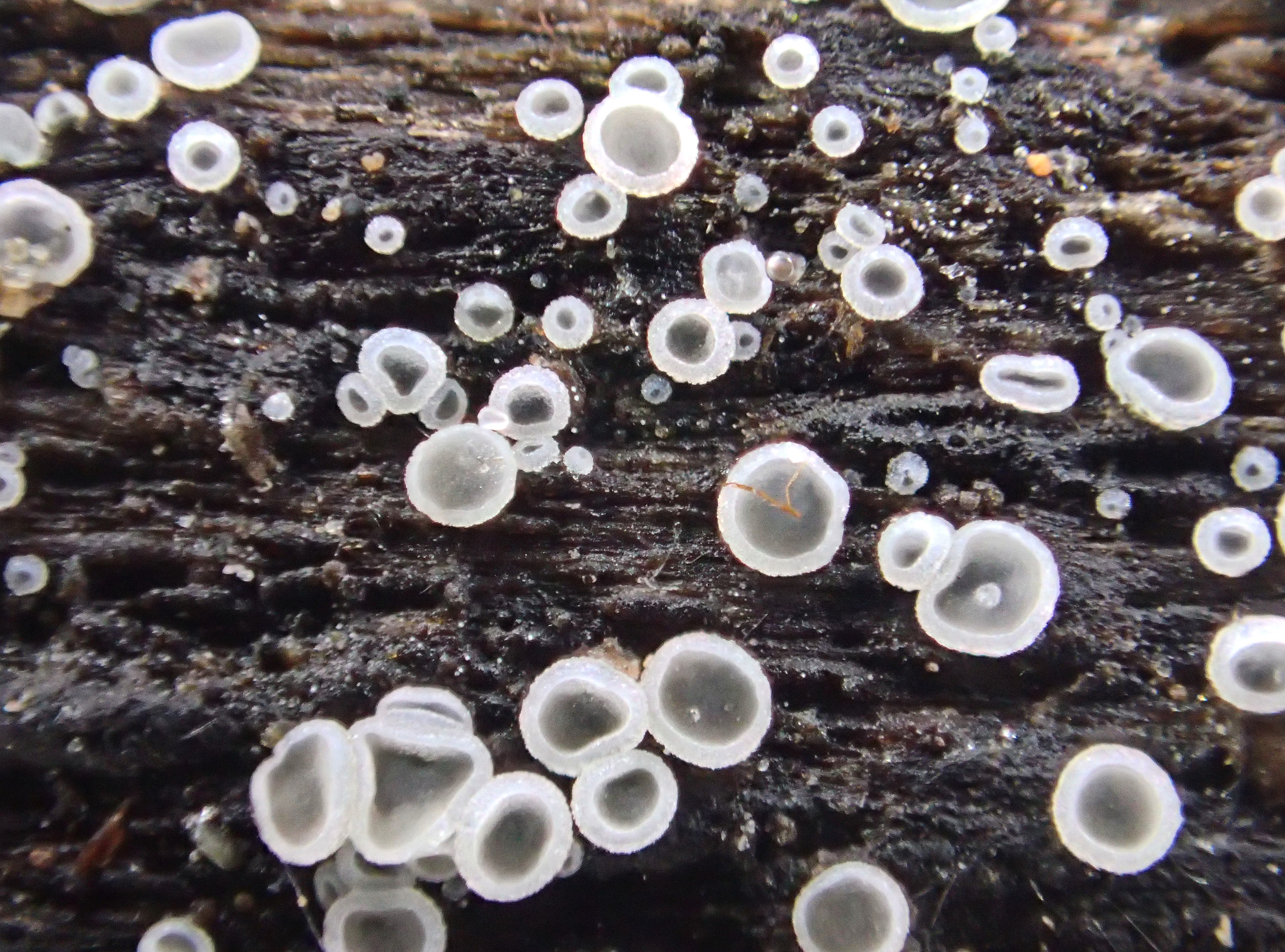
Mollisia benesuada, family: Dermateaceae

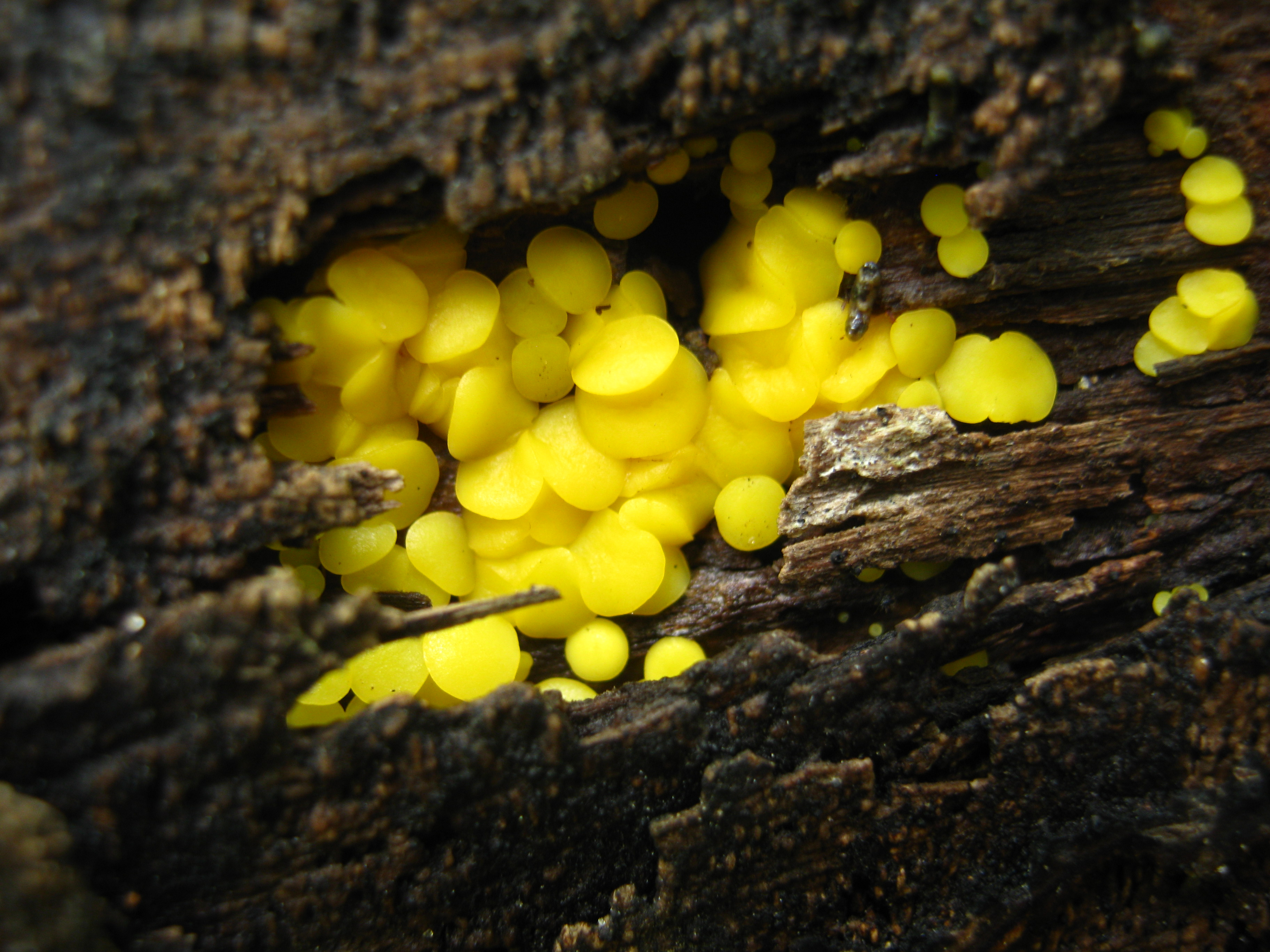
Bisporella citrina, family: Helotiaceae

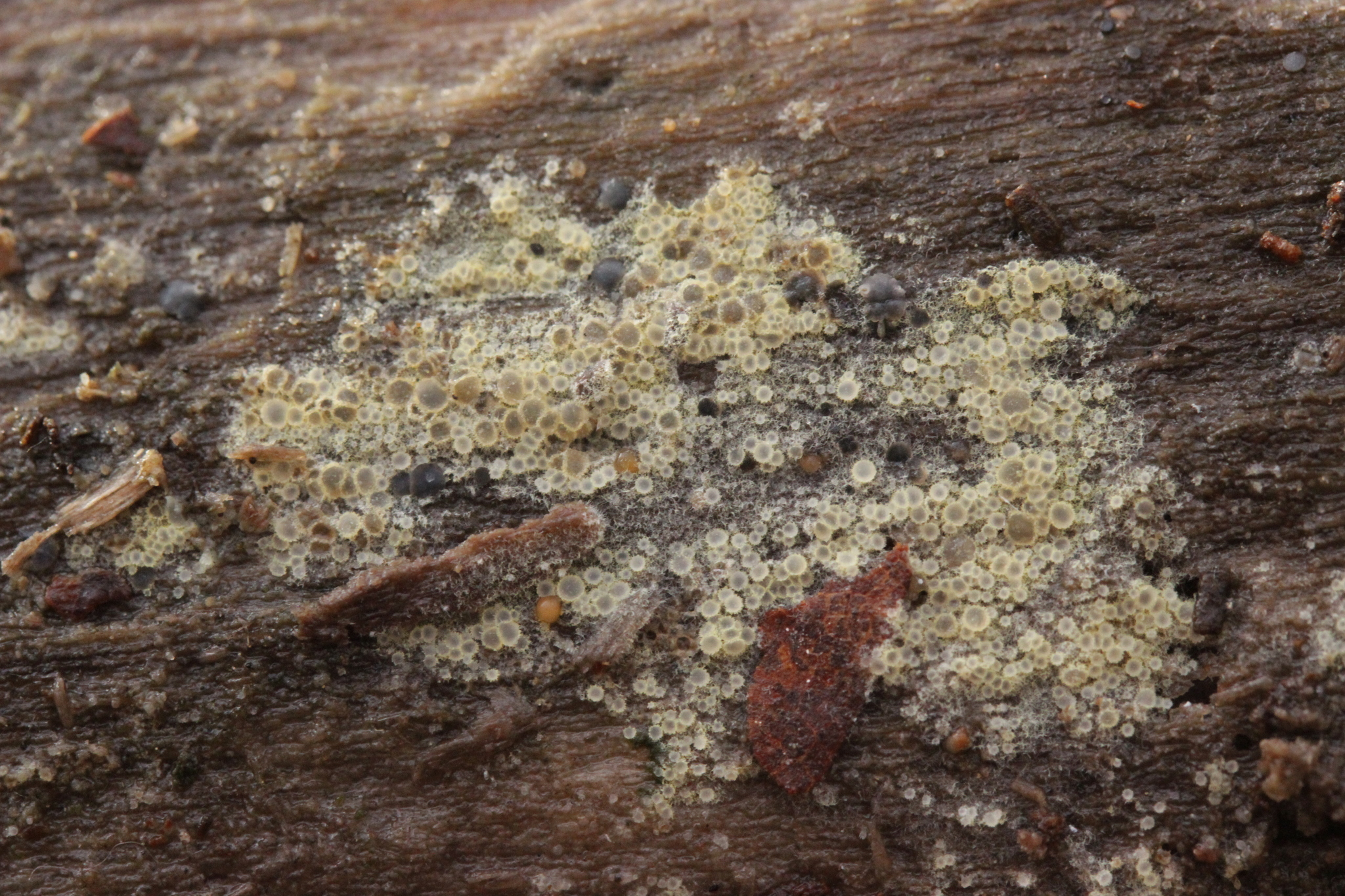
Arachnopeziza aurata, family: Hyaloscyphaceae

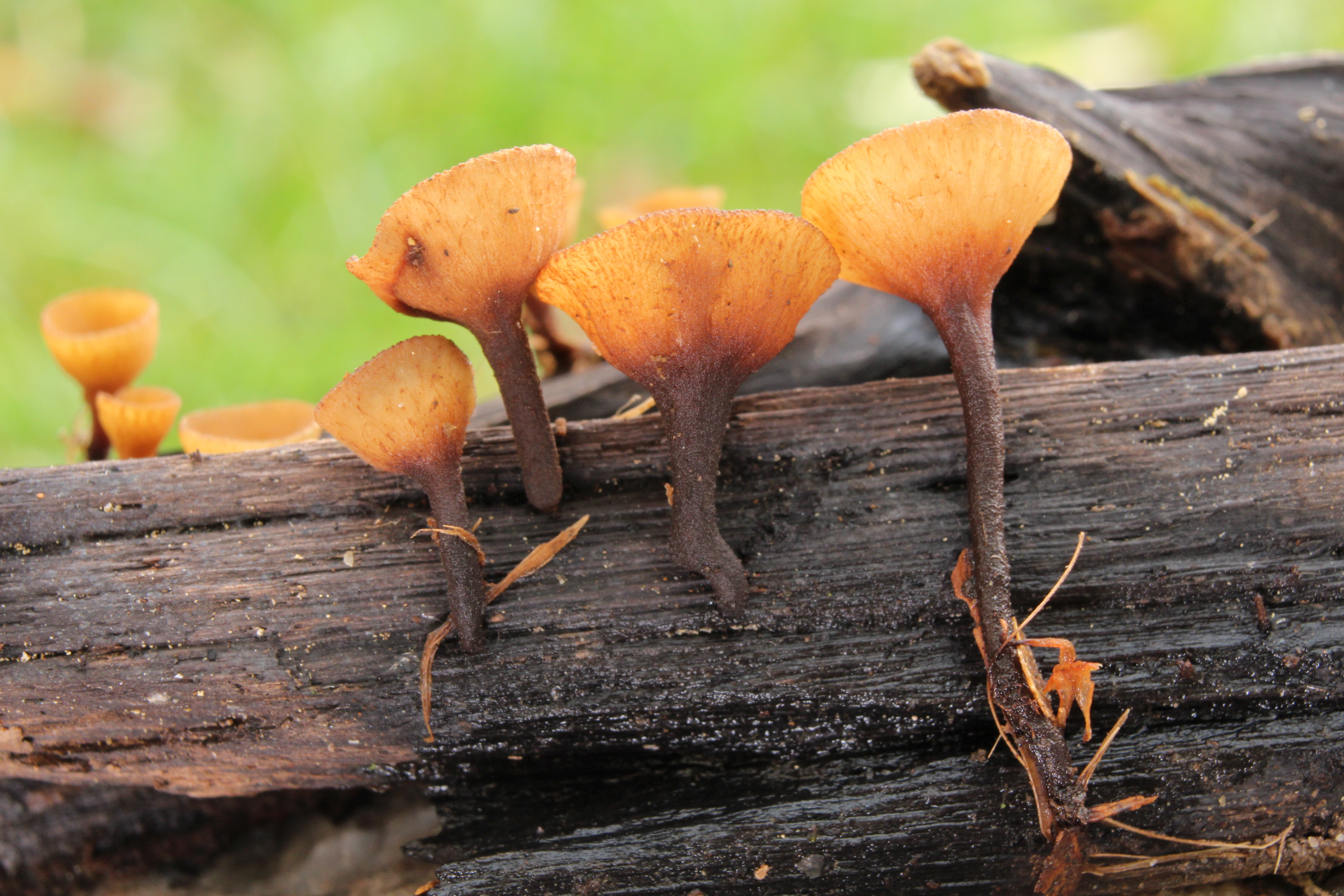
Brown oak disk cup Rutstroemia firma, family: Rutstroemiaceae
(photo: Holger Krisp)

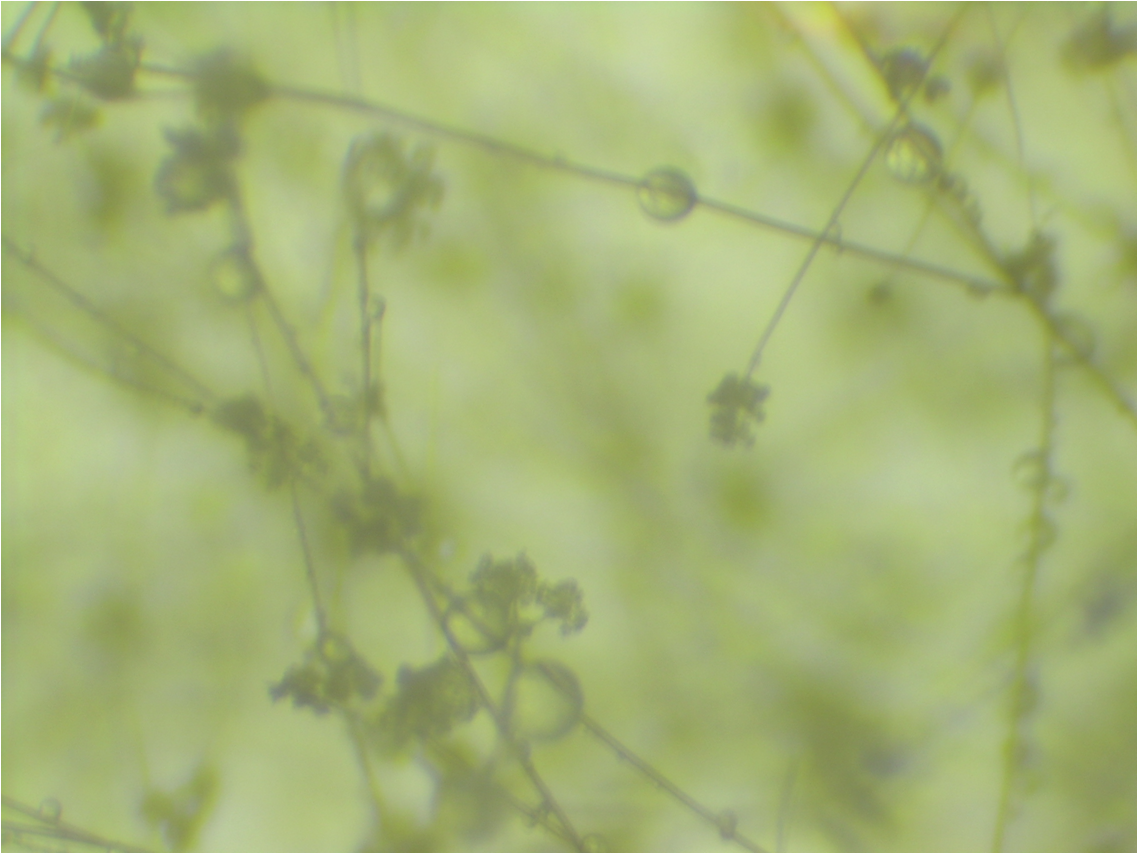
The necrotrophic fungus Botrytis conidiophores, Magnification X16, family: Sclerotinaceae

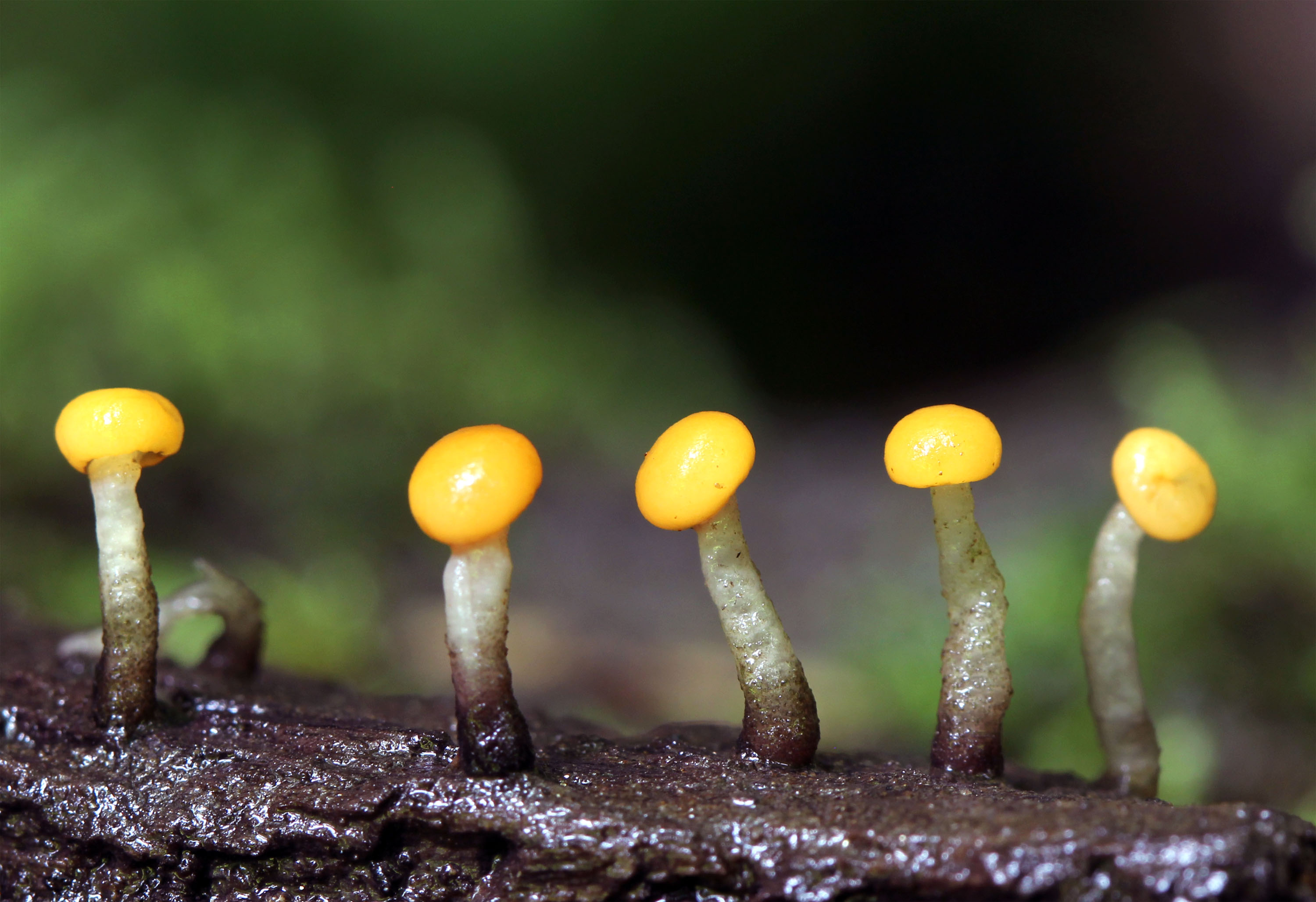
Vibrissea truncorum, family: Vibrisseaceae
image source: Mushroom Observer

== See also ==
- List of Helotiales genera incertae sedis
