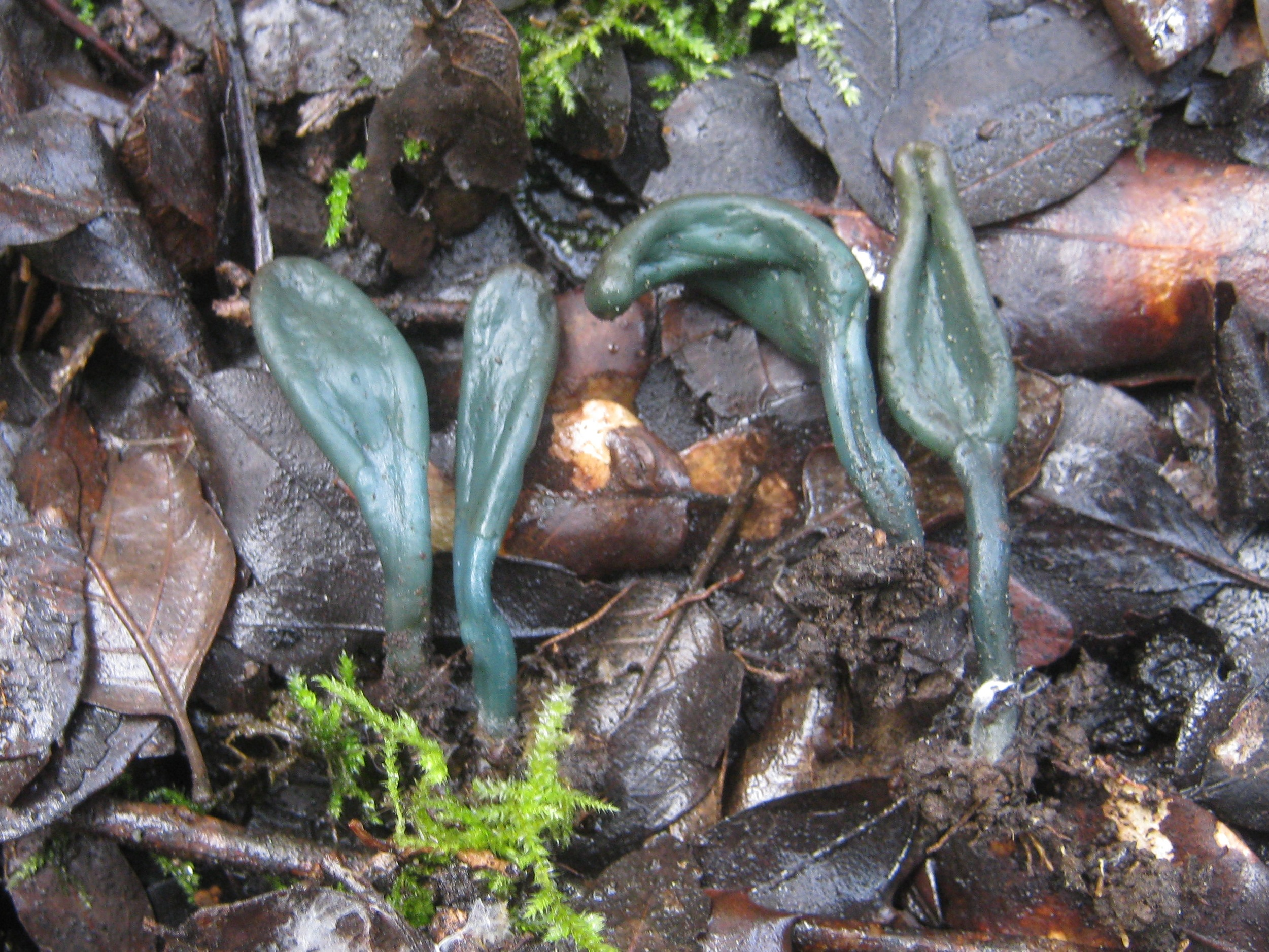
- Microglossum olivaceum

Scientific classification
- Kingdom: Fungi
- Division: Ascomycota
- Class: Leotiomycetes
- Order: Leotiales
- Family: Leotiaceae
- Genus: Microglossum; Gillet (1879)

Type species
- Microglossum viride (Schrad. ex J.F. Gmel.) Gillet (1879)

Synonyms
- Geoglossum subgen. Leptoglossum Cooke (1879); Helote Hazsl. (1881); Leptoglossum (Cooke) Sacc. (1884); Leptoglossum sect. Xanthoglossum Sacc. (1889); Xanthoglossum (Sacc.) Kuntze (1891); Ochroglossum S.Imai (1955)

= Microglossum =

Genus of fungi

Microglossum is a genus of fungi in the family Leotiaceae. Ascocarps (fruit bodies) occur in soil and resemble earth tongues, but are microscopically distinct. Microglossum atropurpureum, a species typical of waxcap grassland in Europe, is of global conservation concern and is listed as "vulnerable" on the IUCN Red List of Threatened Species.

== Species ==
Species Fungorum includes the following accepted species:

1. Microglossum atrovirens (Kunze & J.C. Schmidt) Gillet 1879
2. Microglossum azureum Funez, Alves-Silva & Drechsler-Santos 2024
3. Microglossum capitatum F.L. Tai 1944
4. Microglossum clavatum V. Kučera, Lizoň & Tomšovský 2017
5. Microglossum contortum Peck 1898
6. Microglossum cyanobasis P. Iglesias & Arauzo 2013
7. Microglossum fechtneri Velen. 1934
8. Microglossum flavoviride Sánchez-Flor., García-Jiménez & Raymundo 2023
9. Microglossum fumosum (Peck) E.J. Durand 1908
10. Microglossum griseoviride V. Kučera, Lizoň & Tomšovský 2014
11. Microglossum jaczewskii Naumov 1964
12. Microglossum longisporum E.J. Durand 1908
13. Microglossum lutescens Boud. 1896
14. Microglossum macrosporum Ekanayaka & K.D. Hyde 2019
15. Microglossum minus Velen. 1934
16. Microglossum nudipes Boud. 1917
17. Microglossum obscurum Peck 1899
18. Microglossum olivaceisquamulosum Grund & K.A. Harrison 1967
19. Microglossum olivaceum (Pers.) Gillet 1879
20. Microglossum partitum Pat. 1890
21. Microglossum parvisporum V. Kučera, Lizoň & Tomšovský 2014
22. Microglossum popovkinii Funez, Alves-Silva & Drechsler-Santos 2024
23. Microglossum pratense V. Kučera, Tomšovský & Lizoň 2017
24. Microglossum rickii S. Imai 1942
25. Microglossum rufum (Schwein.) Underw. 1896
26. Microglossum sourellae Funez, Alves-Silva & Drechsler-Santos 2024
27. Microglossum tenebrosum V. Kučera, Tomšovský, Lizoň & F. Hampe 2017
28. Microglossum tetrasporum F.L. Tai 1944
29. Microglossum truncatum V. Kučera, Tomšovský & Lizoň 2017
30. Microglossum viride (Schrad. ex J.F. Gmel.) Gillet 1879

Note:

- Microglossum atropurpureum is a synonym of Geoglossum atropurpureum (Batsch) Pers., 1796
- Microglossum cinnamomeum is a synonym of Sarcoleotia cinnamomea (Maas Geest.) Baral, 2020
