= Elias Judah Durand =

American mycologist and botanist

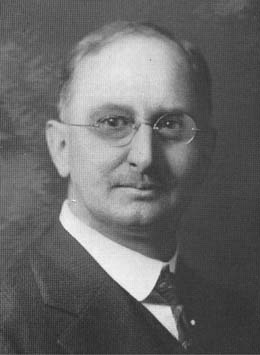
- Born: March 20, 1870; Canandaigua, New York, US
- Died: October 29, 1922 (aged 52)
- Known for: Contributions to taxonomic mycology, and botany
- Scientific career
- Fields: Mycology
- Author abbrev. (botany): E.J. Durand

Elias Judah Durand (20 March 1870 -– 29 October 1922) was an American mycologist, and botanist. He was one of the foremost American experts on the discomycetes.

== Biography ==
Elias Judah Durand was born in Canandaigua, New York. He received his bachelor's degree in botany and entomology from Cornell University in 1893 and his Doctor of Science in botany in 1895 under George Francis Atkinson at Cornell. Following graduation he taught botany and mycology at Cornell until 1910, first as a fellow and later as an instructor. In 1910, Durand was appointed professor of botany at the University of Missouri, where he remained until 1918. In 1918, Durand was named professor at the University of Minnesota, where from 1920 to 1921 he was the Chairman of the Department of Botany. He remained at the University of Minnesota until his death from cancer on 29 October 1922. Durand is buried in the Durand family plot in Woodlawn Cemetery in Canandaigua, New York. He married Anna Louise Perry on 6 September 1899 and had one child, Anna Louise Durand (d. 1981), on 6 June 1901. Anna Louise died shortly after giving birth to their daughter on 11 June 1901. He married Sue Gertrude Stone (d. 1957) on 24 July 1917.

== Mycological contributions ==
Durand contributed to a broad range of botanical sciences, ranging from bryology and pteridology to mycology. He was recognized and highly respected as an authority on discomycetes, and was one of the first Americans to study the group extensively. His personal collection, numbering 12,087 specimens of discomycetes, including 16 types, 27 paratypes, 2 syntypes, and 6,000 microscope slides, was deposited in the Plant Pathology Herbarium at Cornell University (CUP), helping establish that herbarium as a leading center for the study of discomycetes. Durand's collections included 650 types (mostly discomycetes) from other authors and herbaria, currently stored at Cornell University. Additional specimens Durand collected are stored in the herbaria of the Field Museum of Natural History, the University of Kentucky, the University of Minnesota, the New York Botanical Garden, and Pomona College.

== Taxa described and new combinations ==
E.J. Durand described a total of 25 new species, one new form, one new variety, and made 20 new combinations of species. As of 2014, nine of his species and ten recombinations are still accepted (having not been assigned to another genus or reduced to synonymy under previously published names). Durand also described two genera, Gloeoglossum and Ionomidotis which were both later reduced to synonymy.

- Gloeoglossum E.J. Durand 1908 = Geoglossum Persoon 1794
- Ionomidotis E.J. Durand ex Thaxt. 1923 = Ameghiniella Speg. 1888
- Catinella elastica (Pat. & Gaillard) E.J. Durand 1922 = Aleurina elastica (Pat. & Gaillard) Sacc. & P. Syd. 1902
- Catinella negro-olivacea (Schwein.) E.J. Durand 1922
- Ciboria americana E.J. Durand 1902
- Coccophacidium crustaceum (M.A. Curtis) E.J. Durand 1929 = Coccomycetes strobi J. Reid & Cain 1961
- Corynetes arenarius (Rostr.) E.J. Durand 1908 = Sabuloglossum arenarium (Rostr.) Hustad, A.N. Mill, Dentinger & P.F. Cannon 2013
- Corynetes atropurpureus (Batsch) E.J. Durand 1908 = Geoglossum atropurpureum (Batsch) Persoon 1796
- Corynetes robustus E.J. Durand 1908 = Geoglossum atropurpureum (Batsch) Persoon 1796
- Cudonia bulbifera E.J. Durand 1912 = Pseudombrophila bulbifera (E.J. Durand) Brumm. 1995
- Cudonia ochroleuca (Cooke & Harkn.) E.J. Durand 1908
- Dermatea crataegicola E.J. Durand 1904 = Pezicula crataegicula (Durieu) J.W. Groves 1946
- Dermatea puberula E.J. Durand 1904 = Pezicula puberula (E.J. Durand) Verkley 1999
- Dermatella hamamelidis (Peck) E.J. Durand 1902 = Dermea hamamelidis (Peck) J.W. Groves 1946
- Geoglossum affine E.J. Durand 1908
- Geoglossum cohaerens E.J. Durand 1908
- Geoglossum fallax E.J. Durand 1908
- Geoglossum intermedium E.J. Durand 1908
- Geoglossum paludosum (Persoon) E.J. Durand 1908
- Gloeoglossum affine E.J. Durand 1908 = Geoglossum affine E.J. Durand 1908
- Gloeoglossum difforme (Fr.) E.J. Durand 1908 = Geoglossum difforme Fr. 1815
- Gloeoglossum glutinosum (Persoon) E.J. Durand 1908 = Glutinoglossum glutinosum (Persoon) Hustad, A.N. Mill., Dentinger, & P.F. Cannon 2013
- Holwaya gigantea E.J. Durand 1901 = Holwaya mucida (Schulzer) Korf & Abawi 1971
- Holwaya leptosperma (Peck) E.J. Durand 1901 = Holwaya mucida (Schulzer) Korf & Abawi 1971
- Ionomidotis chilensis E.J Durand 1923 = Midotus chilensis (E.J. Durand) Cif. 1957
- Ionomidotis irregularis (Schwein.) E.J. Durand 1923
- Ionomidotis nicaraguensis E.J. Durand 1923 = Midotis nicaraguensis (E.J. Durand) Seaver 1951
- Ionomidotis olivascens E.J. Durand 1923 = Midotis olivascens (E.J. Durand) Seaver 1951
- Inomidotis plicata (W. Phillips & Harkn.) E.J. Durand 1923 = Ameghiniella plicata (W. Phillips & Harkn.) W.Y. Zhuang & Korf 1988
- Ionomidotis urceolata E.J. Durand 1923 = Encoelia urceolata (E.J. Durand) W.Y. Zhuang 1988
- Ionomidotis sprucei (Berk.) E.J. Durand 1923
- Keithia thujina E.J. Durand 1913 = Didymascella thujina (E.J. Durand) Maire 1927
- Keithia tsugae (Farl.) E.J. Durand 1913 = Fabrella tsugae (Farl.) Kirschst. 1941
- Lachnum atropurpureum E.J. Durand 1904 = Lachnella atropurpurea (E.J. Durand) Seaver 1951
- Leptoglossum alveolatum E.J. Durand ex Rehm 1904 = Geoglossum alveolatum (E.J. Durand ex Rehm) E.J. Durand 1908
- Microglossum fumosum (Peck) E.J. Durand 1908
- Microglossum longisporum E.J. Durand 1908
- Midotis infundibuliformis E.J. Durand 1923 = Encoelia infundibuliformis (E.J. Durand) Dennis 1954
- Midotis occidentalis E.J. Durand 1923
- Mitrula alveolata E.J. Durand 1902 = Geoglossum alveolatum (E.J. Durand ex Rehm) E.J. Durand 1908
- Sarcosoma carolinianum E.J. Durand 1903
- Sclerotinia smilacinae E.J. Durand 1902 = Stromatinia smilacinae (E.J. Durand) Whetzel 1945
- Trichoglossum confusum E.J. Durand 1921
- Trichoglossum farlowii (Cooke) E.J. Durand 1908
- Trichoglossum hirsutum f. variabile E.J. Durand 1908 = Trichoglossum variabile (E.J. Durand) Nannf. 1942
- Trichoglossum hirsutum var. wrightii E.J. Durand 1908 = Trichoglossum wrightii (E.J. Durand) E.J. Durand 1921
- Trichoglossum rehmianum (Henn.) E.J. Durand 1908
- Trichoglossum velutipes (Peck.) E.J. Durand 1908
- Trichoglossum walteri (Berk.) E.J. Durand 1908

== Mycological lineage ==
Durand earned his Doctorate of Science under G.F. Atkinson at Cornell. Durand belongs to the mycological lineage of William Russel Dudley. Dudley was a student and assistant under Albert Nelson Prentiss, who was the first head of the Department of Botany at Cornell University. Dudley mentored G.F. Atkinson who later returned to Cornell when Dudley left in 1892. While Durand did not directly mentor any students who would later become professional mycologists, he was well-regarded as an instructor in undergraduate courses.

== Honors and memberships ==
While a student at Cornell, Durand was a member of Sigma Xi, Quill and Dagger, Congress, the Classical Association, and the Natural History Society (of which he was president in his senior year). Durand was a charter member of the American Mycological Society (which merged with the Botanical Society of America in 1903). He was also a member of the American Phytopathological Society and the American Association for the Advancement of Science.

== Eponymous taxa ==
- Durandia (Peck) Rehm (1913) – nom. illegit. (Article 53.1 ICN). Durandia was previously described as a genus in the Cyperaceae by Johan Otto Boeckeler in 1896.
- Durandiella Seaver (1932)
- Durandiomyces Seaver (1928)
- Sphaerospora durandii Rehm (1904)
- Trichoglossum durandii Teng (1932)

== Publications ==
Durand authored or coauthored 30 research publications and one general botany laboratory textbook:

- 1894. Durand EJ. "Some rare Myxomycetes of central New York, with notes on the germination of Enteridium rozeanum". Botanical Gazette 19 (3): 89–95.
- 1894. ———, Halsted BD, Bicknell EP. "Botanical notes". Bulletin of the Torrey Botanical Club 21 (1): 38–42.
- 1894. Durand EJ. "Sporangial trichomes in certain ferns". Bulletin of the Torrey Botanical Club 21 (9): 408–409.
- 1896. ———."Structure of pseudoparenchyma". Botanical Gazette 22 (3): 249.
- 1897. ———. "A disease of currant canes". Bulletin Cornell University Agricultural Experimental Station 125: 24–38.
- 1897. ———. "Outline for use in laboratory practice in a course in general introductory botany". 5 editions.
- 1899. ———. "A washing apparatus". Botanical Gazette 27 (5): 394–395.
- 1900. ———. "The classification of the fleshy Pezizineae with reference to the structural characters illustrating the bases of their division into families". Bulletin of the Torrey Botanical Club 27: 463–495.
- 1901. ———, Britton EG. "Some further observations on Buxbaumia". The Bryologist 4 (2): 32–33.
- 1901. Durand EJ. "Dacryopsis ellisiana Massee". Bulletin of the Torrey Botanical Club 28 (11): 646.
- 1901. ———. "Studies in North American Discomycetes. 1. The genus Holwaya Sacc." Bulletin of the Torrey Botanical Club 28: 349–355.
- 1902. ———. "Studies in North American Discomycetes. 2. Some new or noteworthy species from central and western New York". Bulletin of the Torrey Botanical Club 29: 458–465.
- 1902. ———. "The genus Angelina Fr." The Journal of Mycology 8: 108–109.
- 1903. ———. "The genus Sarcosoma in North America". The Journal of Mycology 9: 102–104.
- 1904. ———. "Three new species of Discomycetes". The Journal of Mycology 10: 99–101.
- 1906. ———. "Peziza fusicarpa Ger. and Peziza semitosta B. & C." The Journal of Mycology 12: 28–32.
- 1906. ———. "Sporangial trichomes". The Fern Bulletin 14: 20–21.
- 1907. ———. "The mycological writings of Theodor Holmskjold and their relation to Persoon's Commentatio". The Journal of Mycology 13: 141–142.
- 1908. ———. "The Geoglossaceae of North America". Annales Mycologici 6: 387–477.
- 1908. ———. "The development of the sexual organs and sporogonium in Marchantia polymorpha". Bulletin of the Torrey Botanical Club 35 (7): 321–335.
- 1909. ———. "The perithecium of Ascomycetes". Botanical Gazette 48 (1): 67–69.
- 1909. ———. "A discussion of some of the principles governing the interpretation of pre-Persoonian names, and their bearing on the selection of a starting-point for mycological nomenclature". Science 29 (1): 670–676.
- 1909. ———. "The Geoglossaceae or Earth-tongues". Ontario Natural Science Bulletin 5: 22–25.
- 1911. ———. "The differential staining of intercellular mycelum". Phytopathology 1 (4): 129–130.
- 1913. ———. "The genus Keithia". Mycologia 5: 6–11.
- 1919. ———. "Peziza proteana var. sparassoides in America". Mycologia 11 (1): 1–3.
- 1919. ———. "Encalypta lacinata in central New York." The Bryologist 22 (2): 13.
- 1919. ———. "Peziza proteana var. sparassoides in America". Mycologia 11 (1): 1–3.
- 1921. ———. "New or noteworthy Geoglossaceae". Mycologia 13 (3): 184–187.
- 1922. ———. "The genus Catinella". Bulletin of the Torrey Botanical Club 49: 15–21.
- 1923. ———. "The genera Midotis, Ionomidotis, and Cordierites". Proceedings of the American Academy of Arts and Sciences 59 (1): 3–19.
