= Alfred Voeltzkow =

German zoologist and botanist

Alfred Voeltzkow (14 April 1860 – February 1947) was a German zoologist and botanist from Berlin, Brandenburg.

He studied sciences at the universities of Heidelberg, Berlin, Freiburg, and Würzburg, receiving his doctorate at Freiburg in 1887 with a dissertation on Aspidogaster conchicola. He obtained his habilitation at the University of Strasbourg, and in 1900 became a member of the Deutsche Akademie der Naturforscher Leopoldina.

Voeltzkow is remembered for his scientific journeys in eastern Africa and islands of the Western Indian Ocean; (Comoros, Madagascar, Juan de Nova and Aldabra). On these expeditions, Voeltzkow collected zoological specimens of numerous genera for study and classification.

Voeltzkow's best-known written works involved his African journeys, and were titled:

- "Wissenschaftliche Ergebnisse der Reisen in Madagascar und Ost-Africa in den Jahren 1889-1895"
- "Reise in Ostafrika in den Jahren 1903-1905".

His name is associated with numerous species, including Cinachyrella voeltzkowi, Spinivorticella voeltzkowi, Cataulacus voeltzkowi, Pteropus voeltzkowi, Leucochrysa voeltzkowi, Oligochrysa voeltzkowi, Anapochrysa voeltzkowi, Lissoclinum voeltzkowi and the chameleon Furcifer voeltzkowi.

== Botany ==
Voeltzkow was the author of two species of plants: Phyllanthus boivinianus (Baill.) Voeltzk. in the family Euphorbiaceae and Toddalia unifoliata (Baill.) Voeltzk. in the family Rutaceae. In 1908 Paul Christoph Hennings named the fungus genus Voeltzkowiella (family Bulgariaceae) in his honor.
