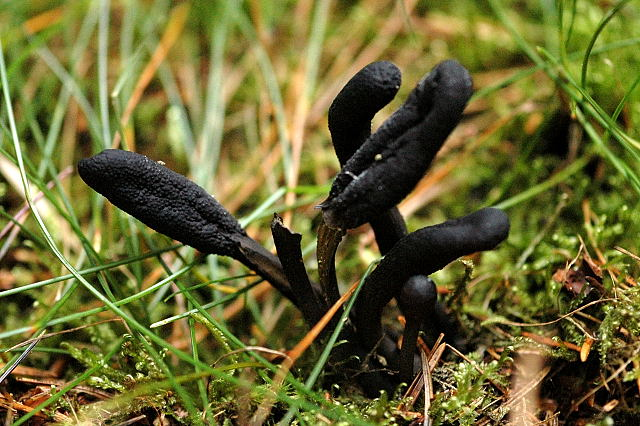
- Geoglossum umbratile

Scientific classification
- Kingdom: Fungi
- Division: Ascomycota
- Class: Geoglossomycetes
- Order: Geoglossales
- Family: Geoglossaceae
- Genus: Geoglossum; Pers. (1794)

Type species
- Geoglossum glabrum Pers. (1794)

Synonyms
- Cibalocoryne Hazsl. (1881); Corynetes Hazsl. (1881); Microglossum Sacc. (1884); Thuemenidium Kuntze (1891); Gloeoglossum E.J.Durand (1908)

= Geoglossum =

Genus of fungi

Geoglossum is a genus of fungi in the family Geoglossaceae. They are commonly called earth tongues. The type species is Geoglossum glabrum. Geoglossum species are distinguished from the related genus Trichoglossum by the lack of setae on the spore bearing surface. Geoglossum species are characterized by dark, club-shaped, terrestrial ascocarps with a fertile hymenium continuing downward from the apex of the ascocarp along the stipe, eventually intergrading with a sterile stipe. The ascospores of Geoglossum range from translucent to dark brown, and are fusiform, and multiseptate. Identification of species is based on the gross morphology of the ascocarp, color and septation of the ascospores, and shape and ornamentation of the paraphyses.

== Taxonomy ==
Geoglossum was described by Christian Hendrik Persoon in 1794, who created the genus to accommodate Clavaria ophioglossoides L. and three other species: Geoglossum hirsutum (now Trichoglossum hirsutum (Pers.) Boud.), Geoglossum lilacinum (now Thuemenidium atropurpureum (Batsch) Kuntze), and Geoglossum viride (now Microglossum viride (Pers.) Gillet). Persoon expanded the genus in several subsequent publications and the name was sanctioned by Elias Magnus Fries in his 1821 Systema Mycologicum I. Several mycologists have treated the genus extensively since Persoon's first work, including George Edward Massee, Elias Judah Durand, Curtis Gates Lloyd, Fred Jay Seaver, and Edwin Butterworth Mains.

Synonyms of Geoglossum include Frigyes Ákos Hazslinszky's Cibalocoryne and Corynetes (both published in 1881), Pier Andrea Saccardo's 1884 Microglossum, and Otto Kuntze's 1891 Thuemenidium. In 1908, Durand circumscribed Gloeoglossum to contain Geoglossum species with paraphyses in a continuous gelatinous layer on the stipe (including G. affine, G. difforme, and G. glutinosum), but the genus is not considered to have independent taxonomic significance.

Modern systematic analysis is sparse, though recent molecular studies have supported Geoglossum as monophyletic.

== Description ==
The fruit bodies of Geoglossum species are usually club-shaped, with a surface that is dry to sticky or gelatinous (particular in wet weather), and brown to black. The hymenium (spore-bearing surface) is confined to the upper club-shaped part of the fruit body. Stipes are slender and cylindrical, with a surface texture ranging from smooth to squamulose (covered with tiny scales), or, in some instances, covered with tufts of tiny hairs. The asci are club-shaped, inoperculate (without a cap or lid), and usually contain eight ascospores. These spores are club-shaped to somewhat cylindrical to somewhat fusiform. Brown to hyaline in color, there are both septate and non-septate forms (or, in some species, a combination of the two). There are paraphyses mixed with the asci, and in some species these occur on the stipes scattered or grouped together so as to form small tufts or scales. In some species they are spread out on the stipe surface as a continuous gelatinous layer.

== Distribution ==
Geoglossum species are found worldwide and have been studied extensively in Asia, Australasia, Europe, India, North America, and South America.

== Selected species ==
Index Fungorum currently lists 160 names of Geoglossum, including forms and varieties, though many dubious, invalid names and synonyms have been published in the genus to date. The Dictionary of the Fungi (10th edition, 2008) recognizes 22 species. However, a number of new combinations and novel species have been proposed since, based on molecular and morphological data.

- Geoglossum alveolatum (E.J.Durand ex Rehm) E.J.Durand 1908
- Geoglossum atrovirens Kunze & J.C.Schmidt
- Geoglossum barlae Boud. 1889
- Geoglossum berteroi (Mont.) Colenso 1887
- Geoglossum brunneipes S. Arauzo, A. Lebre & M. Becerra 2014
- Geoglossum chamaecyparinum S. Arauzo 2014
- Geoglossum cookeanum Nannf. ex Minter & P.F. Cannon 2015
- Geoglossum difforme Fr. 1815
- Geoglossum dunense Loizides, M. Carbone & P. Alvarado 2015
- Geoglossum elongatum Starbäck ex Nannf. 1942
- Geoglossum geesterani S. Arauzo & A. Lebre 2014
- Geoglossum fallax E.J.Durand 1908
- Geoglossum glabrum Pers. 1794
- Geoglossum hakelieri Nitare 1983
- Geoglossum heuflerianum Bail ex Saccardo 1889
- Geoglossum hookeri Cooke 1875
- Geoglossum inflatum (Mains) S. Arauzo 2014
- Geoglossum nigritum (Fr.) Cooke 1878
- Geoglossum peckianum Cooke 1875
- Geoglossum scabripes P. Iglesias & S. Arauzo 2014
- Geoglossum simile Peck 1873
- Geoglossum sphagnophilum Ehrenb. 1818
- Geoglossum starbaeckii Nannf. 1942
- Geoglossum uliginosum Hakelier 1967
- Geoglossum umbratile Sacc. 1878
- Geoglossum variabilisporum S. Arauzo 2014
- Geoglossum viscosum Pers. 1797
- Geoglossum vleugelianum Nannf. 1942

== Conservation ==
Several species of Geoglossum are considered to be of conservation significance and many species are found on Regional Red Lists of several European countries. Geoglossum are common components of the endangered waxcap grassland habitat in Europe. G. arenarium is listed as vulnerable in Estonia G. atropurpureum is a UK Biodiversity Action Plan Priority species, and is listed as critically endangered in Denmark and Estonia. G. atrovirens is listed as critically endangered in Estonia. G. cookeanum is listed as endangered in Switzerland. G. difforme is listed as critically endangered in Denmark and endangered in Sweden. G. glabrum is listed as critical in Czech Republic. G. hakelieri is listed as vulnerable in Sweden. G. littorale is listed as critically endangered in Denmark, and endangered in Sweden. G. sphagnophilum is listed as endangered in Denmark. G. starbaeckii is listed as vulnerable in Denmark. G. uliginosum is listed as critically endangered in Sweden. G. umbratile is listed as critically endangered in Bulgaria.

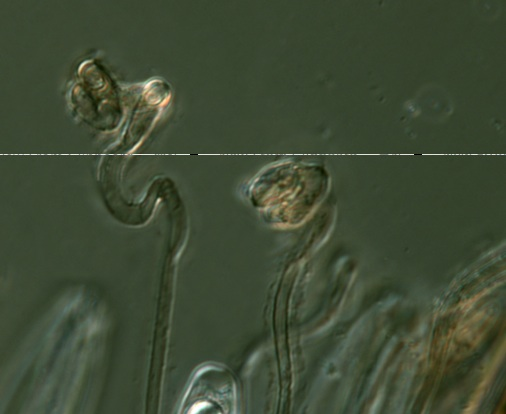
Geoglossum difforme paraphyses, 800X total magnification.

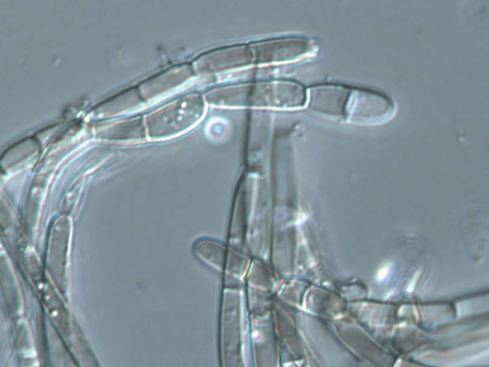
Geoglossum simile paraphyses, 800X total magnification.

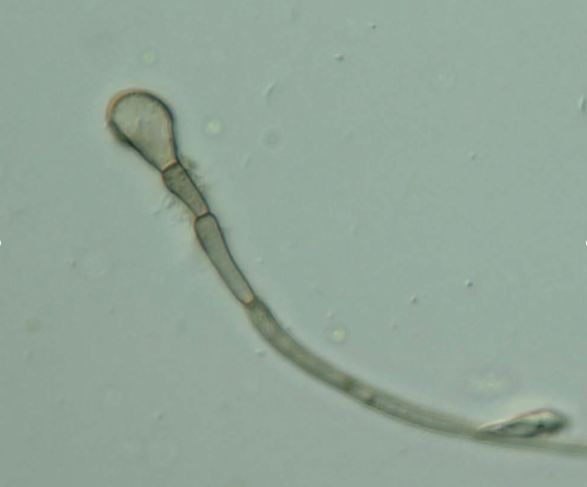
Geoglossum cookeanum paraphyses, 800X total magnification.

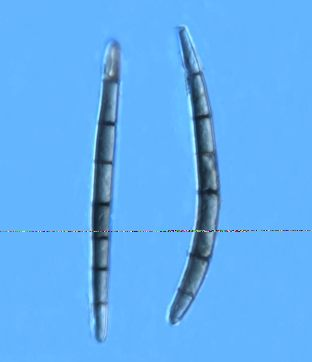
Geoglossum barlae spores, 800X total magnification.
