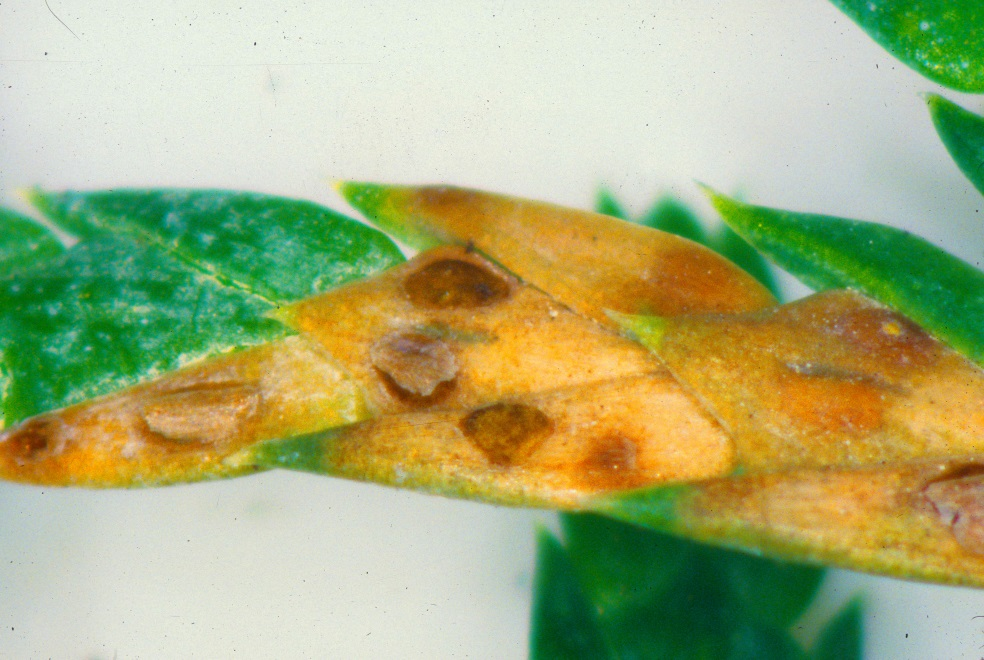
- Didymascella thujina on western red cedar leaflets. Yellow leaflets are infected by the fungus, whereas green leaflets are uninfected. Apothecia are reddish brown to dark brown in colour. The mature apothecia have a loosened host epidermal layer and the immature apothecia have not yet broken through the host epidermal layer.

Scientific classification
- Kingdom: Fungi
- Division: Ascomycota
- Class: Leotiomycetes
- Order: Helotiales
- Family: Cenangiaceae
- Genus: Didymascella
- Species: D. thujina

Binomial name
- Didymascella thujina (Durand) Maire 1927

Synonyms
- Keithia thujina E.J. Durand 1913

= Didymascella thujina =

Species of fungus

Didymascella thujina is an ascomycete fungus in the family Helotiaceae. D. thujina causes cedar leaf blight (also known as Keithia blight or Keithia leaf blight), a leaf disease, on western red cedar (Thuja plicata) and white cedar (T. occidentalis).

== Taxonomy and nomenclature ==
The common name of Keithia blight or Keithia leaf blight was derived from the first generic designation for the fungus and remained in use for many years. Pier Andrea Saccardo erected the genus Keithia in 1892 for this fungus, and in 1903 the genus Didymascella for the same fungus was published as new, twice in the same month. René Maire in 1905 rejected the generic designation of Didymascella when he followed a suggestion that it was synonymous with Keithia. In 1927, Maire again took-up the genus Didymascella when it was reported that Keithia was previously used for a genus of flowering plants. The name Keithia thujina remained in use in the literature until 1960 when R. G. Pawsey corrected the name to Didymascella thujina.

== Distribution ==
=== North America ===
Didymascella thujina occurs on western red cedar (T. plicata) and T. plicata var. atrovirens on the west coast of North America, where it is a significant leaf blight. It also occurs in eastern white cedar (T. occidentalis) in eastern North America, although its effect is insignificant. It also occurs on some varieties of ornamental Thuja. Didymascella thujina was found occurring on Port Orford cedar (Chamaecyparis lawsoniana) seedlings in a nursery in Washington, US.

Didymascella thujina was reported occurring on Atlantic white cedar (Chamaecyparis thyoides) in the eastern US, however, this fungus, which occurs on Chamaecyparis species, has since been reclassified as Didymascella chamaecyparisii.

The name Keithia thujina was used by Elias Judah Durand in 1908 for the first record of the disease in the United States on eastern white cedar. Durand in 1913, further described and illustrated Keithia thujina that was collected from mature trees of eastern white cedar in Wisconsin. Durand felt that the disease only affected the host when environmental conditions favoured epidemics. G. C. Carew noted cedar leaf blight on eastern white cedar in Newfoundland.

From 1912 to 1915 the disease was reported as seriously affecting western red cedar in the western U.S. state of Idaho where it was widely distributed throughout the range of T. plicata, including the adjoining areas of central Oregon, western Montana, and southern British Columbia (B.C.). W. A. Porter studied the occurrence and distribution of the disease in western red cedar forests in B.C. Later surveys extended the range of occurrence on western red cedar throughout its coastal and interior ranges in B.C. and Alaska. Cedar leaf blight has been found on both 1 and 2 year-old container-grown western red cedar seedlings in B.C. nurseries, and on western red cedar in bare root nurseries in California.

=== Europe ===
Cedar leaf blight has been introduced into Europe probably being carried on western red cedar imported from North America. The first European records were from Ireland where the disease destroyed nursery-grown T. plicata. Soon after its discovery in Ireland the disease was found to be well established in England and Scotland. Later, cedar leaf blight was reported from the Netherlands ^{[34]} and Denmark, where it was so serious that nurseries curtailed or stopped growing cedar. Cedar leaf blight continued to spread to Norway, Belgium, France, Switzerland, Italy, Germany, Poland, Spain, Austria, Slovakia, and the Czech Republic. In Germany, Peter Burmeister reported that D. thujina likely occurred on Chamaecyparis lawsoniana, but he was unable to confirm this.

=== Other areas of the world ===
There is the risk of cedar leaf blight becoming established wherever Thuja species are introduced and grown, as is evidenced by its occurrence on Thuja species introduced into Europe. Thuja has been introduced to other countries, including India, Australia, Chile and Ukraine, but at present D. thujina has not been reported as a disease.

== Ecology ==
Most ecological observations on cedar leaf blight damage are its occurrence on western red cedar (Thuja plicata), which is the most susceptible host. Cedar leaf blight is favoured by conditions of prolonged foliage wetness and where air movement is restricted, e.g., high seedling density in a nursery or seedlings over-grown by ground cover plants in reforestation sites. Individual western red cedar trees vary in susceptibility to the disease and although all age classes are affected, seedlings and young trees suffer the most. A physiological change in western red cedar appears to account for an increase in blight resistance for certain individual trees when they reach 4 or 5 years of age. The use of degree days to establish biological events for Didymascella thujina, a foliar fungal leaf blight of Thuja plicata seedlings. The consequence of cedar leaf blight infection of the foliage of mature cedar trees (greater than 50 years of age) is unknown, and given that mortality is rare, loss of incremental growth may be a chief result. However, cedar leaf blight may be a pioneering fungal pathogen that induces some stress on the host tree allowing a further succession of biotic or abiotic problems.

== Epidemiology and symptoms ==
Germinating ascospores cause very early symptoms on mature foliage that appear as several small cream-coloured spots on the upper surface of individual cedar leaflets. These spots later develop into lesions, which coalesce as a discreet spot, but the entire leaf becomes brown contrasting with adjacent green, healthy leaves. Infected leaflets are scattered over a branch, but they only occur on the previous year's leaflets, and not the current year's growth. Mycelial growth occurs within individual leaflets and once sufficient growing degree days have accumulated under suitable environmental conditions, apothecia are formed. A cross section of leaflet through an apothecium shows that the apothecium is initially covered by the leaf cuticle and a one-cell thick epidermal layer which is golden brown to brown in colour. The apothecium is raised slightly above the surrounding leaf tissue. When the epidermal covering breaks three quarters around the circumference of the apothecium, it lifts up as a scale, exposing the hymenial layer. As the exposed apothecium matures, it changes from golden brown to dark brown in colour. When moist, the cushion-like hymenial layer of the apothecium is golden-olive. At this point ascospores are released. When dry, apothecia appear much darker and the epidermal scale often folds back over the apothecium, and no further ascospores are released. Under repeated episodes of wetting and drying for up to week, ascospore release can occur. Discharged ascospores are covered with a sticky, mucilaginous coating that attach the ascospores to any type of surface. Where ascospores stick to the host material, they produce a germ tube and directly penetrate the epidermis, and not through stomata. Affected leaflets often remain on the tree, weathering to a grey colour with dark cavities where spent apothecia have either shrivelled or fallen out. No anamorphic stage is known.

== Diagnostic methods ==
An electrophoretic technique has been used to analyzed the proteins of disease-free and D. thujina-infected leaves of T. plicata, revealing differences in several protein bands. This suggests that distinct proteins of D. thujina origin can be identified by the SDS-PAGE technique.

== Control ==
The same conditions that make nursery production of seedlings successful — high densities, favourable temperatures and moisture, and intensive crop-management techniques — are also ideal for the cedar leaf blight fungus. Healthy trees result when pest management is integrated with other aspects of nursery culture throughout the crop cycle.

=== Chemical ===
Numerous studies were made with fungicides to control cedar leaf blight on nursery seedlings. Very few fungicides were found to be effective, but of those that were effective, many and frequent applications were required for control of the disease in seedling nursery settings. If control of cedar leaf blight is through fungicides only, they must be applied early and through the length of the growing season of 1-year old seedling, and throughout the full growing season of 2-year old seedlings. The effect of the fungicide is to damage ascospores that are on the leaflet surface that drift into the growing areas during a spring release period and to damage the newly forming fruiting bodies and their ascospores forming in the fall on the foliage.

=== Growth conditions ===
Various modifications of cultural practices have been tried for the control of cedar leaf blight. In Britain, western red cedar seedlings were grown in nurseries isolated from known sources of inoculum, but the results were inconclusive. Another suggestion was to grow Thuja in isolated nurseries. Thuja would be raised from seed at isolated nurseries with a periodic clearance of all cedar stock before resowing. This was partly successful, but some outbreaks of cedar leaf blight still occurred. Growing bareroot nursery or transplant cedar at reduced densities (seedlings per unit area), e.g., to decrease within canopy humidity, has provided some measure of blight control. Growing cedar as a mixture with other species, both in seed and transplant beds, has also given some control of the disease.

Older infected cedar stock or infected cedar trees surrounding a nursery can provide inoculum and the ascospores can travel through the air. Airborne ascospores can be kept out of cedar-rearing greenhouses by keeping a roof and side walls in place until after the spring ascospore release period. This practice directly prevents ascospores from coming in contact with the cedar crop.

Through the summer months (in the northern hemisphere) of July, August and September, when climatic conditions are warmer and drier, circulating dry air through the crop will decrease the time that foliage remains wet. As the crop matures, foliage density increases and moisture is retained on leaf surfaces, especially the lower branches. Free water is required for the germination and infection of leaves by D. thujina. Foliage wetness can be decreased by separating the growing containers, thus allowing a more efficient drying-out between waterings.

From October through to the end of November (in the northern hemisphere), air should be allowed to circulate through the crop, and where possible, seedlings should be protected from the rain. If infection has occurred fruiting bodies can form and disease spread will be encouraged by the presence of moisture on the infected foliage.

Seedlings held over for either growth for another year into the spring are particularly susceptible to cedar leaf blight infection and expression. Held-over seedlings must be protected throughout the previous growing season, or disease expression will occur early in the spring. The first signs of the disease are often subtle and overlooked in the early spring and the disease can easily spread. By applying fungicides to the crop in the first growing season and continuing through the second growing season, a disease-free crop of 2+0 western red cedar can be produced.

== Resistance to cedar leaf blight ==
Resistance to cedar leaf blight is known in Thuja. B. Søegaard inoculated both cuttings from a mature western red cedar tree and seedlings from the same tree, and showed that the cuttings were more resistant than the seedlings. Søegaard also determined that resistance is the result of a recessive gene in T plicata. Crossing T. plicata with a Japanese species Thuja standishii, where resistance was dominant, resulted in a 1:1 ratio of resistant to susceptible offspring. Søegaard suggested that cuttings could be produced from such hybrids.

Porter, in attempting to explain the variation in blight severity in British Columbia, collected T plicata cuttings and inoculated some in the field and others in the laboratory. Regardless of host origin, inoculation site or technique, no resistance was found. Based on these results Porter concluded that microclimate is mainly responsible for differences in blight severity.

Variation in cedar leaf blight resistance of western red cedar populations is known to be related to seed origin. Trees from milder and wetter ecosystems are more resistant to cedar leaf blight when planted in similar areas, and also, low-elevation populations exhibit the most resistance to cedar leaf blight, while high-elevation populations show the least.

== Disease impact ==
In North America western red cedar seedling mortality rates of up to 97% have been recorded, resulting in large economic losses to growers. Seedling mortality of nursery grown seedlings also occurs when they are planted into reforestation areas. The disease greatly reduces the number of plants suitable for planting. Harry H. Kope and D. Trotter have shown in younger (<4 years of age) western red cedar trees that growth and yield can be affected by cedar leaf blight. A decrease of 30% in stem diameter, 50% in shoot biomass and 35% in roots biomass has been recorded for blight affected trees as compared to unblighted trees in reforestation sites.^{[55]} This decrease in tree growth and yield can contribute to additional years of tree maintenance in reforestation sites, before the trees can compete with other plants and that the site is considered adequately reforested.

Cedar leaf blight disease intensity is projected to increase under the moderate temperature and precipitation increases that climate models have forecast for the 2020s in coastal North America. To avoid significant mortality and growth reduction of planted western red cedar, it is recommended that reforestation efforts deploy adapted or disease resistant western red cedar seedlots in high risk environments common to coastal North America.
