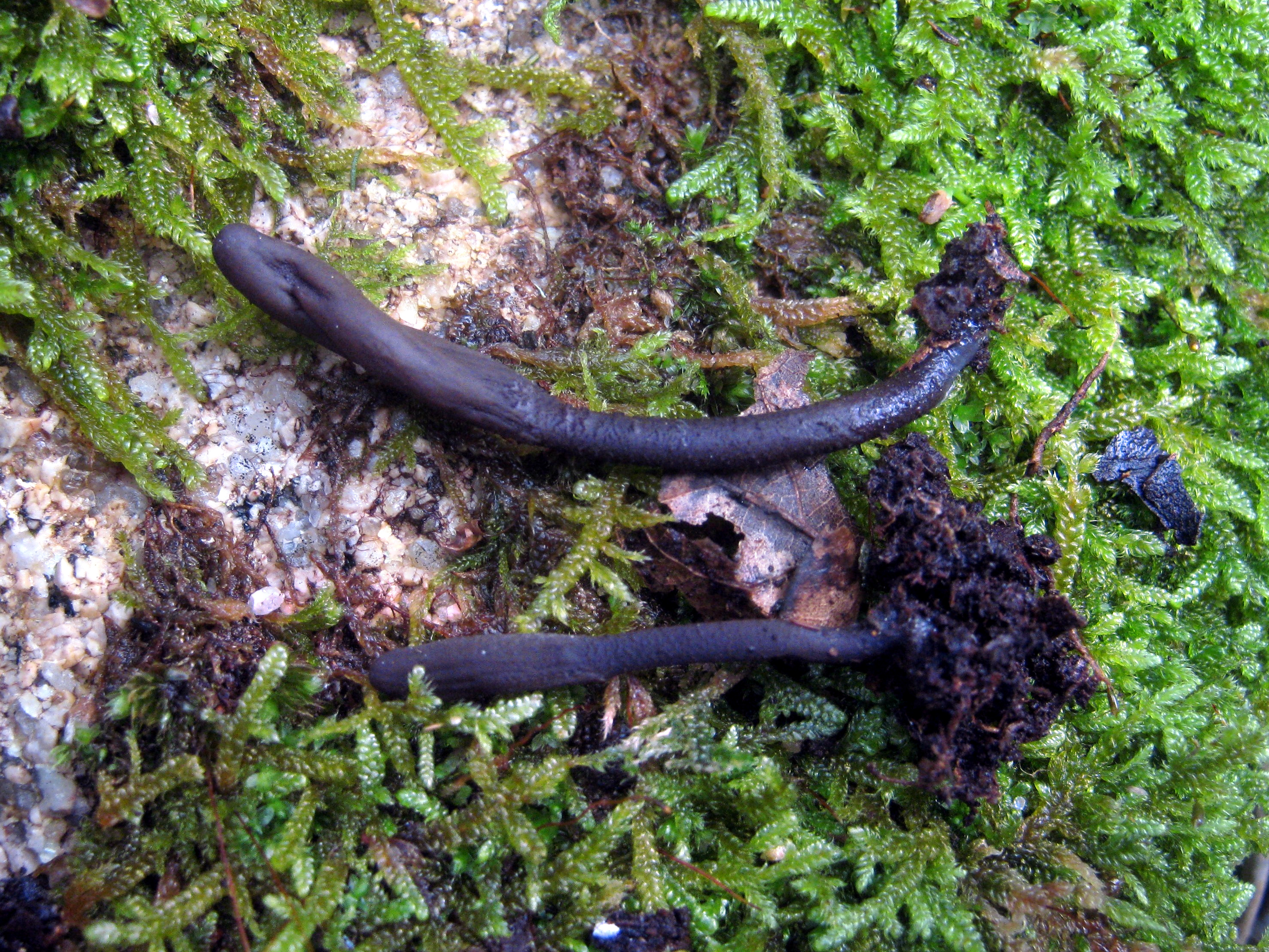

Conservation status
- Vulnerable (IUCN 3.1)

Scientific classification
- Kingdom: Fungi
- Division: Ascomycota
- Class: Leotiomycetes
- Order: Leotiales
- Family: Leotiaceae
- Genus: Microglossum
- Species: M. atropurpureum

Binomial name
- Microglossum atropurpureum (Batsch) P.Karst. (1885)

Synonyms
- Clavaria atropurpurea Batsch (1783); Geoglossum atropurpureum (Batsch) Pers. (1796); Leotia atropurpurea (Batsch) Corda (1842); Thuemenidium atropurpureum (Batsch) Kuntze (1891); Corynetes atropurpureus (Batsch) E.J.Durand (1908); Corynetes robustus E.J.Durand (1908); Microglossum robustum (E.J.Durand) Sacc. & Traverso (1911); Leptoglossum robustum (E.J.Durand) Sacc. & Traverso (1911)

= Microglossum atropurpureum =

Species of fungus

Microglossum atropurpureum is a species of fungus in the family Leotiaceae. In the UK, it has been given the recommended English name of dark-purple earthtongue. Ascocarps (fruit bodies) are black, often with a purple tint, and are irregularly club-shaped. They occur in soil and resemble earth tongues, but are microscopically distinct. The species was formerly referred to the genus Geoglossum, but is not closely related to the Geoglossomycetes.

Microglossum atropurpureum is found in eastern North America and Europe, where it is typical of waxcap grasslands, a declining habitat due to changing agricultural practices, such as fertilization methods. As a result, the species is of global conservation concern and is listed as "vulnerable" on the IUCN Red List of Threatened Species. Furthermore, this species is believed to be found primarily in grasslands. Very little is known about it because of its rarity, but more research is underway. The lack of grazing animals in its natural habitats in Europe add to the danger that the species is in. Because of the low presence of grazing animals, invasive species have been allowed to take over most of the area and "choke out" the dark-purple earthtongue.

There is belief that the Hanboigoir microglossum and genera microglossum should be removed from the family geoglossaceae because the fact that geoclossaceae is polyfyletic (meaning from more than one common evolutionary ancestor). At this moment, there is no evidence that suggests the genera migroglossum fits that criteria.
