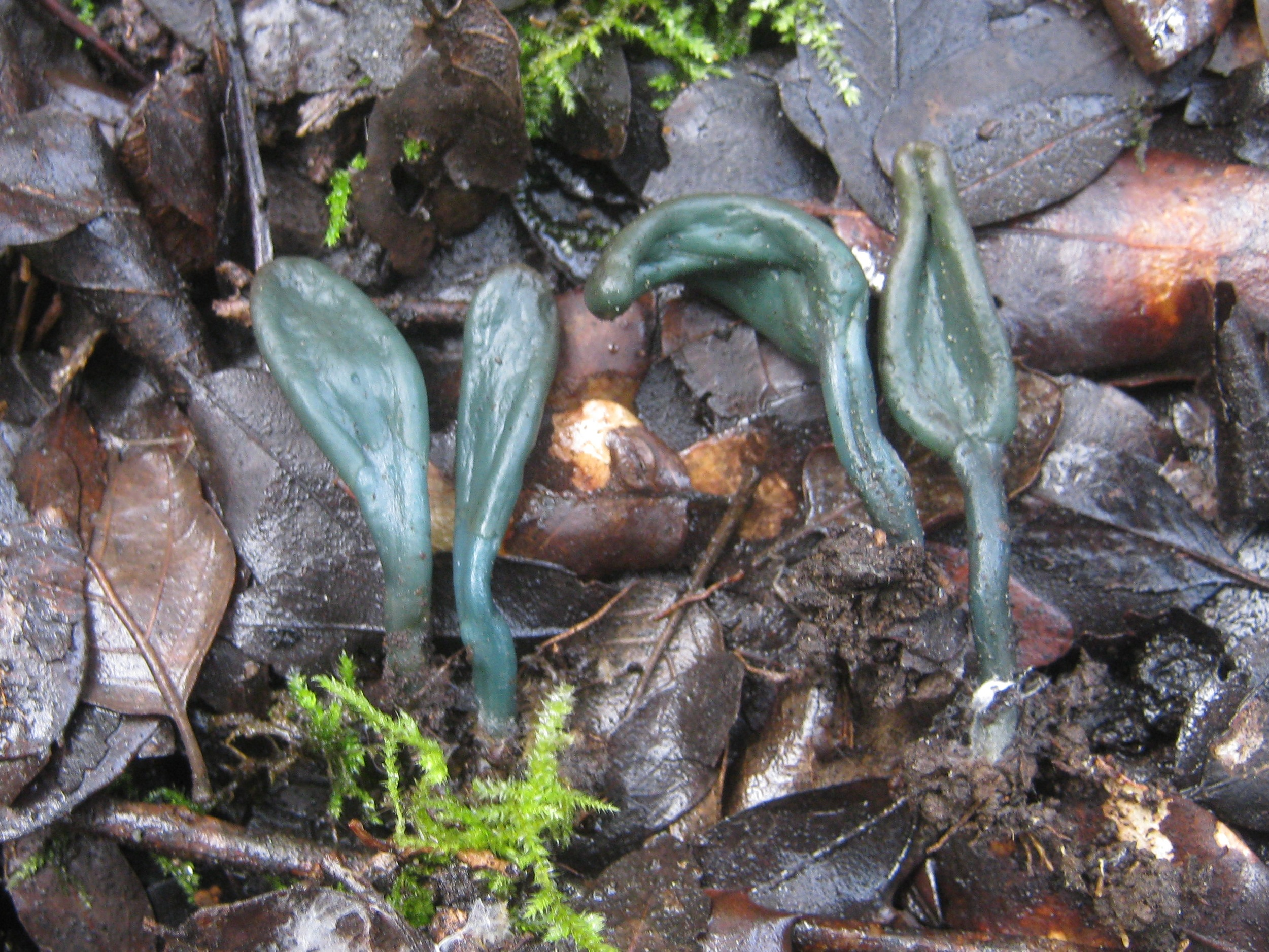

Scientific classification
- Kingdom: Fungi
- Division: Ascomycota
- Class: Leotiomycetes
- Order: Leotiales
- Family: Leotiaceae
- Genus: Microglossum
- Species: M. olivaceum

Binomial name
- Microglossum olivaceum (Pers.) Gillet, 1879

= Microglossum olivaceum =

Species of fungus

Microglossum olivaceum (vernacular name: olive earthtongue) is a species of fungus belonging to the family Leotiaceae.

Synonym:

- Geoglossum olivaceum Pers. (= basionym)
