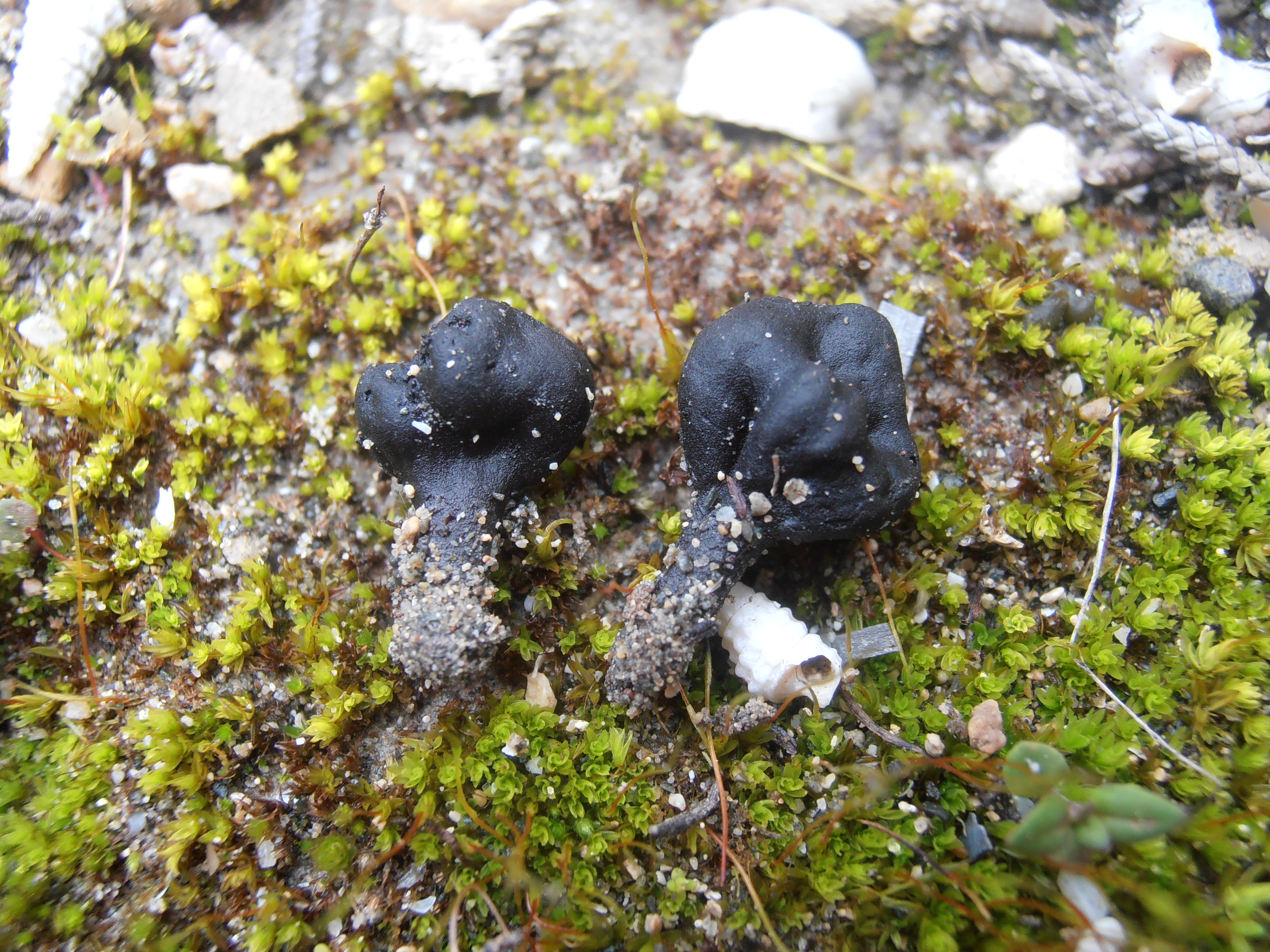

Scientific classification
- Domain: Eukaryota
- Kingdom: Fungi
- Division: Ascomycota
- Class: Geoglossomycetes
- Order: Geoglossales
- Family: Geoglossaceae
- Genus: Geoglossum
- Species: G. dunense

Binomial name
- Geoglossum dunense Loizides, M.Carbone & P.Alvarado (2015)

= Geoglossum dunense =

Species of fungus

Geoglossum dunense is an earth tongue fungus in the family Geoglossaceae, described as new to science in 2015. It is known from the island of Cyprus, where it grows in coastal dunes and salt marshes under the Phoenicean juniper (Juniperus phoenicea), but has also been documented in Malta and England following collections from diverse habitats. It produces very small fruit bodies barely exceeding 1–2 cm and has polymorphic, often moniliform paraphyses and predominantly 3-septate spores.

== Taxonomy and phylogeny ==
Geoglossum dunense was described as new to science in 2015, following collections from the Mediterranean islands of Cyprus and Malta. Phylogenetic analyses of the ribosomal internal transcribed spacer (ITS) region and large subunit ribosomal ribonucleic acid (LSU), have placed G. dunense in an independent lineage near G. vleugelianum and G. inflatum.

== Description ==
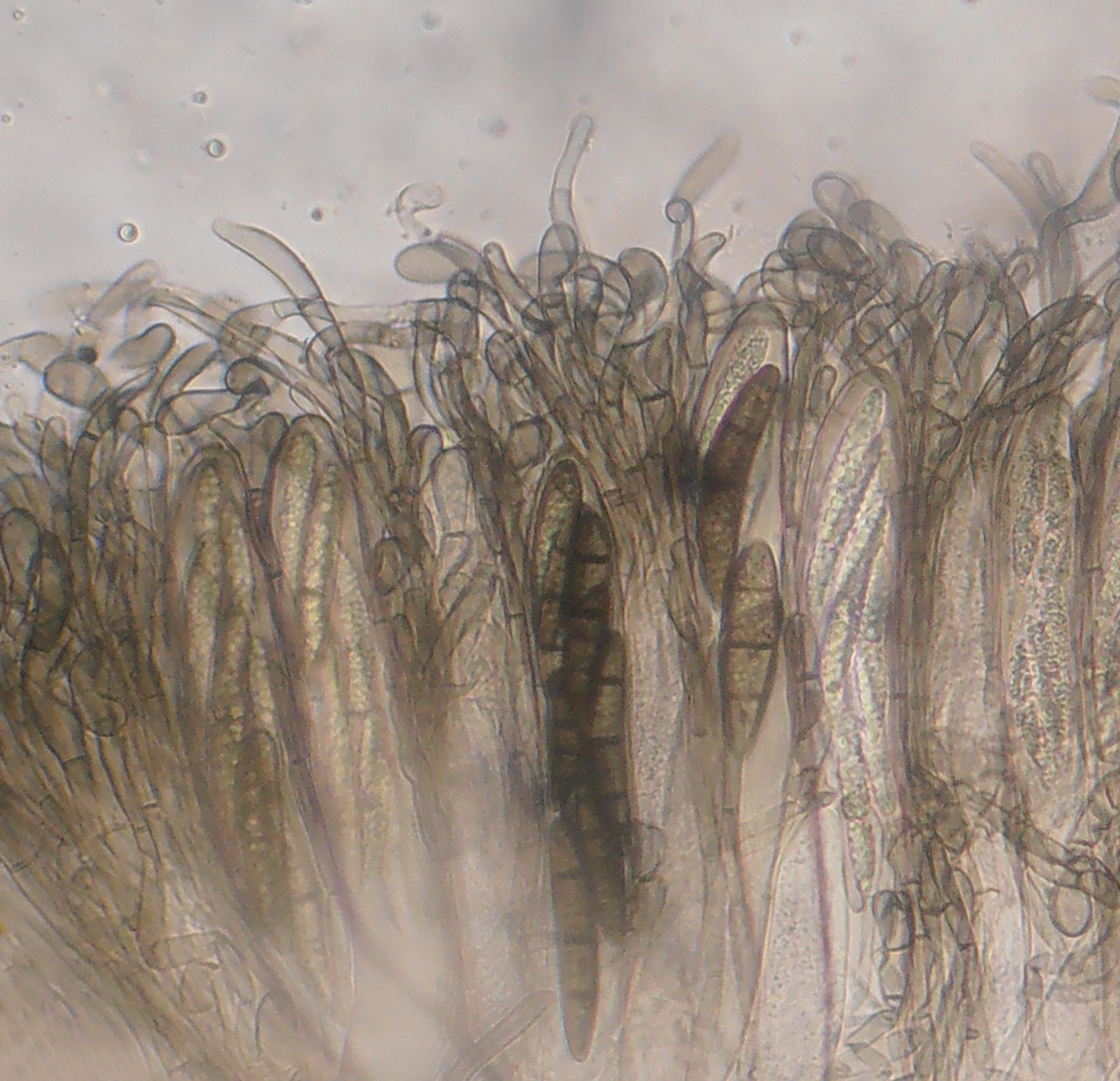
Paraphyses and asci in Potassium hydroxide.

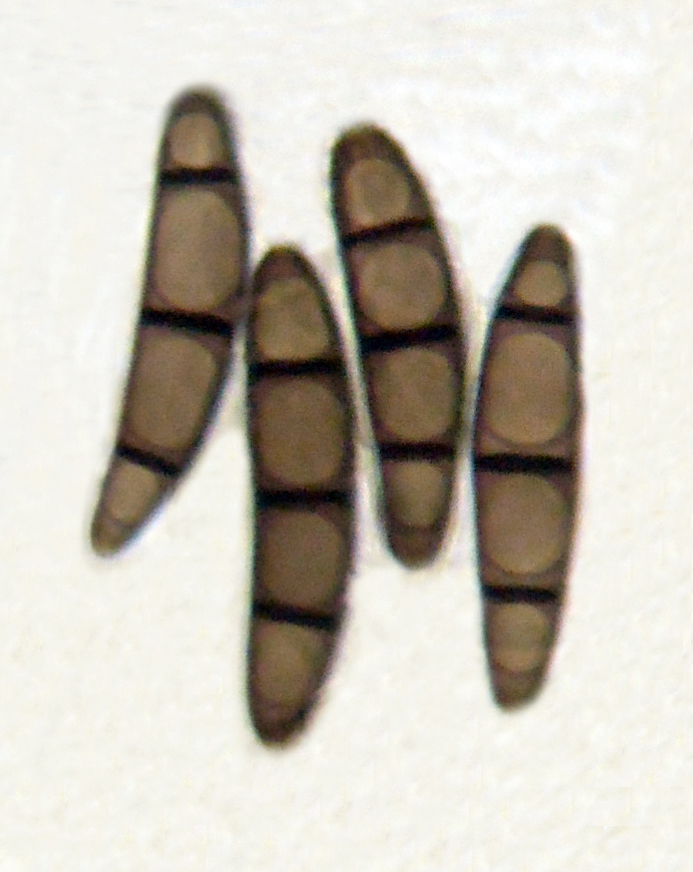
Mature spores typically with 3 septa.

=== Morphology ===
The tiny fruitbodies, measuring 1−2.3 cm by 0.8−1.1 cm, are black, dry, and consist of a lobed or club-shaped head and a minutely squamulose stipe which is usually submerged into the substrate.

The spores are fusiform to subfusiform, somewhat bent, measuring (28−) 31−44 (−53) by (7−) 8−10 (−12) μm. At maturity they develop 2−3, or very rarely 1−4 septa. The paraphyses are highly polymorphic and often moniliform, hooked, branched, or contorted. The asci are large, 8-spored and have an amyloid apical pore. The trama features parallel or sometimes intertwined hyphae, resembling a textura intricata. The stipe surface is composed of brown hyphae with short, slightly clavate terminal elements 4–6 μm wide.

=== Similar species ===
A very similar species to Geoglossum dunense is G. heuflerianum, originally collected from Nockspitze mountain, south-east of Innsbruck, Austria. This poorly known taxon was rediscovered in 2017 after more than 150 years, and an updated description was provided by Fluri and colleagues. It differs from G. dunense mainly in its alpine ecology, slightly smaller fruit bodies up to 1.4 cm tall and slightly larger spores measuring 38.7–52.7 × 8.3–11.3 μm.

Geoglossum hakelieri, described from grassy pastures in Sweden, is also reported to have multiseptate polymorphic paraphyses and spores with 1–3(−5) septa, but produces much larger brownish-grey ascocarps up to 4–5 cm tall, has more slender cylindrical spores measuring 30–40 × 4.5–5.5 μm, and much smaller asci measuring 100–125 × 12–17 μm.

== Ecology and distribution ==
On Cyprus and Malta, Geoglossum dunense grows on coastal dunes and salt marshes among Juniperus, Olea and Fumana shrubs. A 2019 British report of this species from grasslands in Hardcastle Crags (West Yorkshire), however, suggests that its ecology and distribution might be wider than previously thought.
