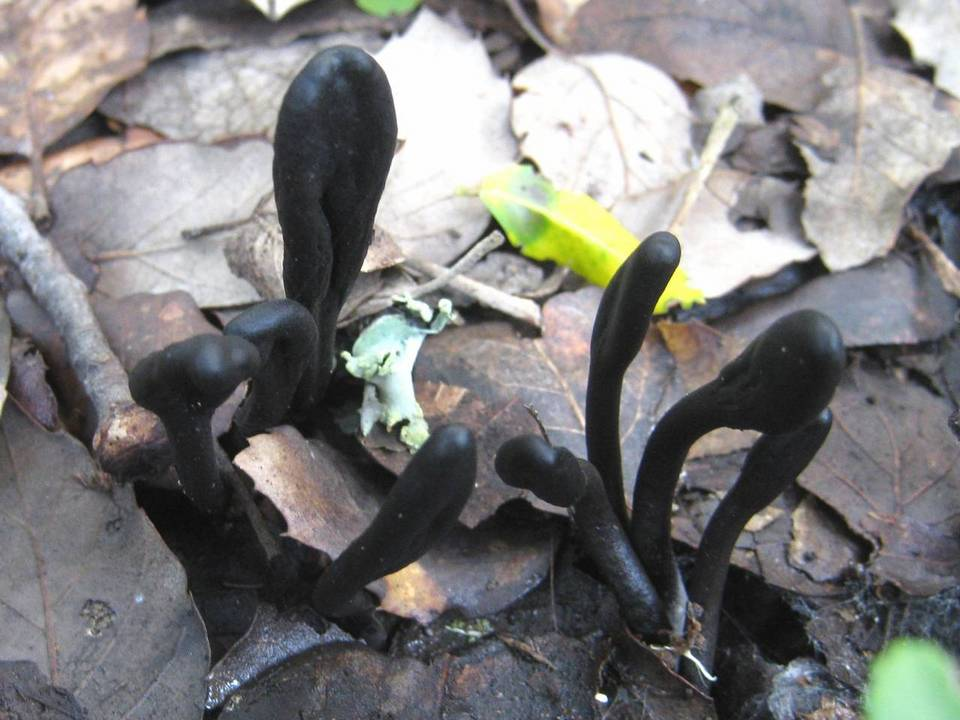

Scientific classification
- Domain: Eukaryota
- Kingdom: Fungi
- Division: Ascomycota
- Class: Geoglossomycetes
- Order: Geoglossales
- Family: Geoglossaceae
- Genus: Geoglossum
- Species: G. cookeanum

Binomial name
- Geoglossum cookeanum Nannf.

= Geoglossum cookeanum =

Species of fungus

Geoglossum cookeanum is a mushroom in the family Geoglossaceae, commonly referred to as an "earth tongue" fungus. It is a member of the division Ascomycota, known for its dark, elongated, club-like fruiting body. Geoglossum cookeanum is found in nutrient-poor soils and plays an important role in ecosystem processes, particularly in decomposing organic material (Minter & Cannon, 2015).

== Habitat and Distribution ==
Geoglossum cookeanum has been recorded in Europe, North America, and parts of Asia. It thrives in damp, moss-covered environments, particularly in acidic, nutrient-poor soils such as grasslands, heathlands, and undisturbed woodlands (Kučera & Lizoň, 2012). It is often associated with waxcap-grassland ecosystems, where it coexists with other rare fungal species.

== Ecology and Role in Ecosystems ==
This species is saprotrophic, meaning it decomposes organic material to obtain nutrients. It contributes to nutrient cycling in soil, helping to maintain ecosystem balance (Hustad et al., 2014). Unlike mycorrhizal fungi, which form mutualistic relationships with plants, G. cookeanum survives independently, relying on decaying matter for sustenance.

Recent studies suggest that Geoglossum cookeanum and related species may serve as bioindicators of ecosystem health due to their sensitivity to soil composition and habitat disturbance (Hustad et al., 2014). The presence of G. cookeanum in an area often indicates that the soil has remained low in nitrogen and has not been significantly altered by agriculture or pollution.
