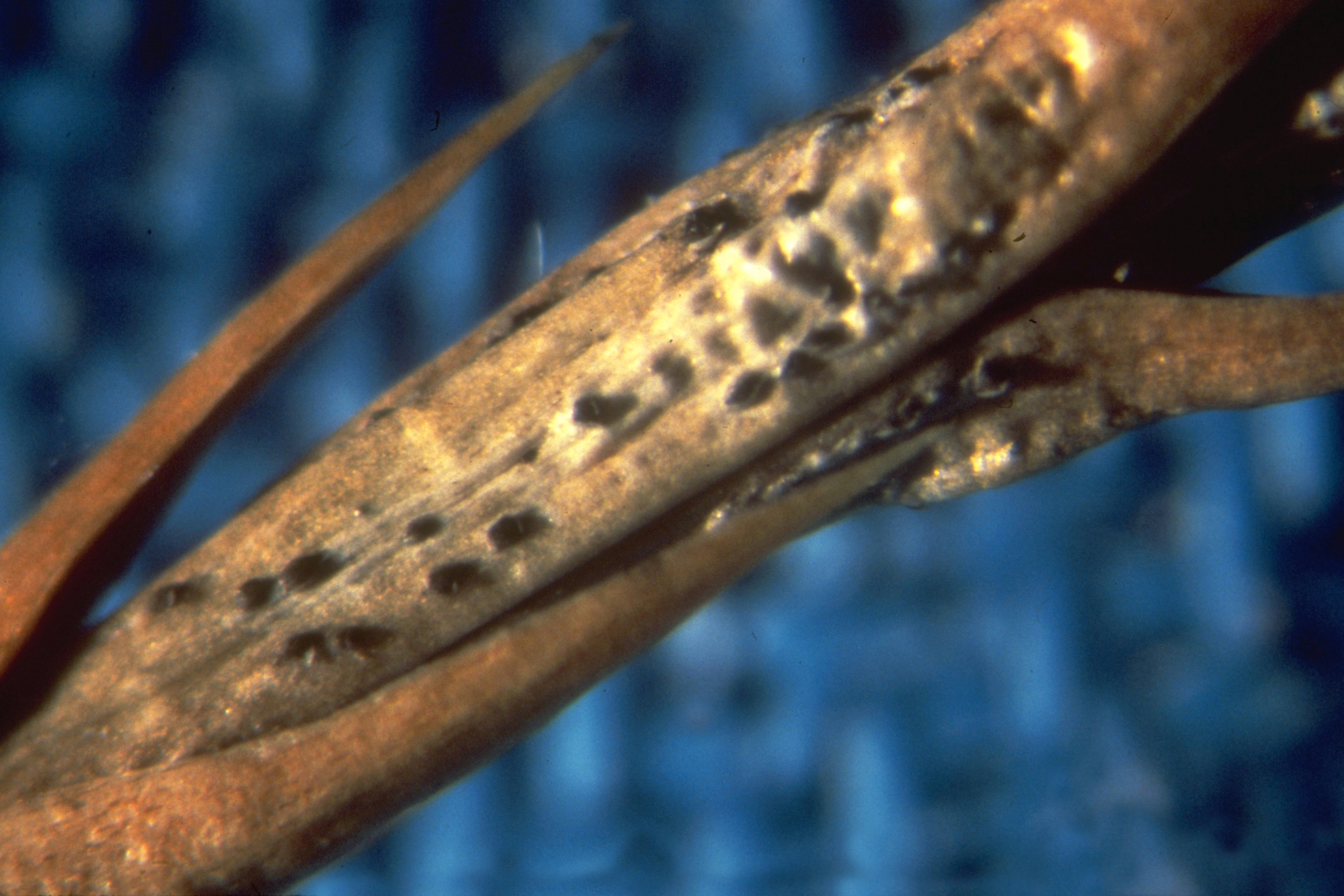
- Spores of Didymascella thujina on juniper needles

Scientific classification
- Domain: Eukaryota
- Kingdom: Fungi
- Division: Ascomycota
- Class: Leotiomycetes
- Order: Helotiales
- Family: Cenangiaceae
- Genus: Didymascella; Maire & Sacc.

= Didymascella =

Genus of fungi

Didymascella is a genus of fungi belonging to the family Hemiphacidiaceae.

The species of this genus are found in Europe and Northern America.

Species:

- Didymascella chamaecyparidis (J.F.Adams) Maire
- Didymascella juniperi Anon.
- Didymascella oxycedri Maire & Sacc.
- Didymascella tetramicrospora Pantidou & Darker
- Didymascella tetraspora (W.Phillips & Keith) Maire
- Didymascella thujina (E.J.Durand) Maire
