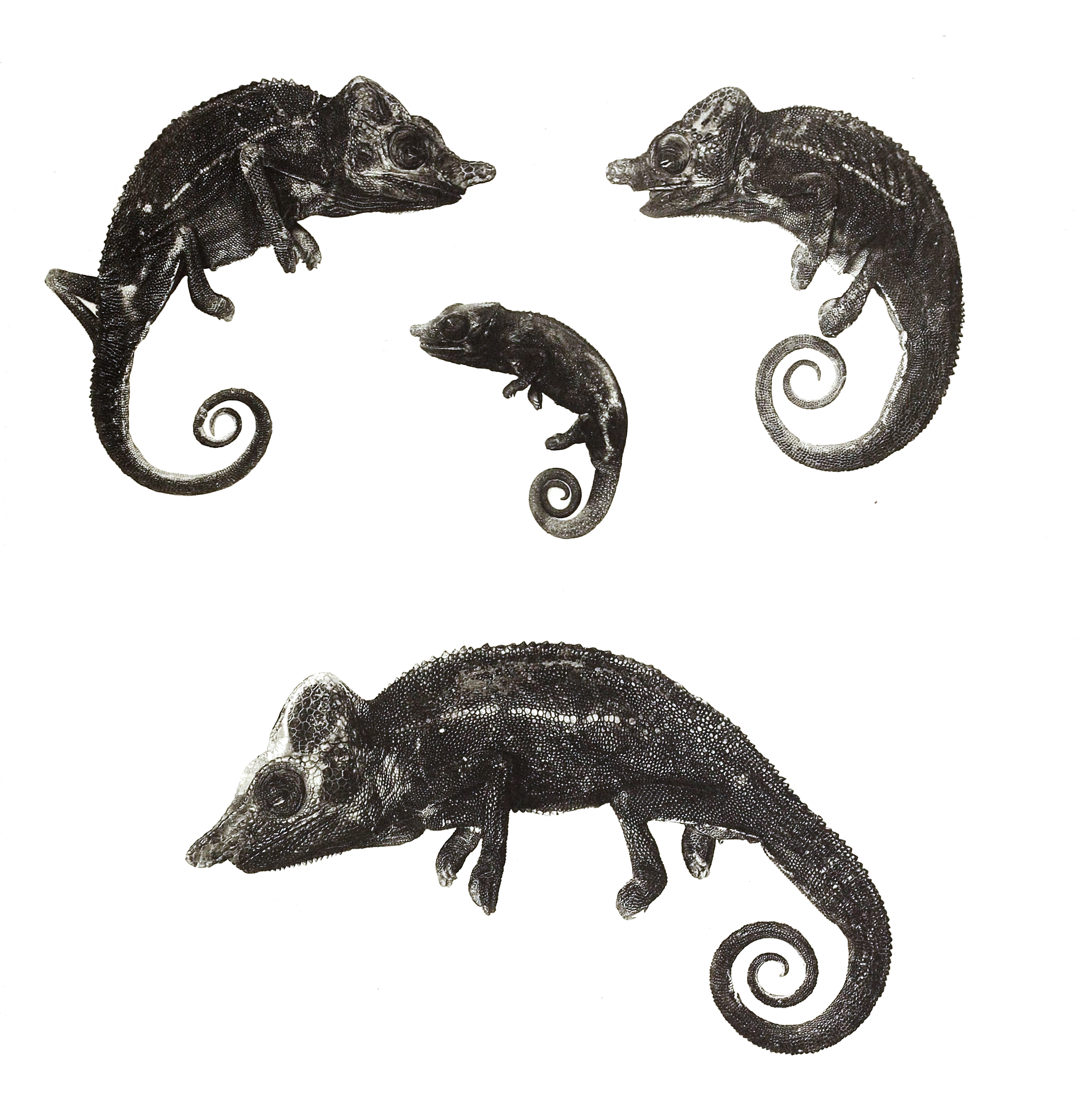
- Photograph of specimens collected by Voeltzkow, published in 1913

Scientific classification
- Kingdom: Animalia
- Phylum: Chordata
- Class: Reptilia
- Order: Squamata
- Suborder: Iguania
- Family: Chamaeleonidae
- Genus: Furcifer
- Species: F. voeltzkowi

Binomial name
- Furcifer voeltzkowi (Boettger, 1893)

= Voeltzkow's chameleon =

Species of lizard

Voeltzkow's chameleon (Furcifer voeltzkowi) is a species of chameleon that is endemic to Madagascar. The species was described by Oskar Boettger in 1893, from an adult male specimen collected by A. Voeltzkow.

In 2018, it was rediscovered, having last been seen in 1893. Females were found for the first time, and were found to display particularly colourful patterns during pregnancy, when encountering males or when stressed.

Its close relative Labord's chameleon exhibits an annual life cycle with an adult lifespan of only a few months spending most of its life as an egg, reaching sexual maturity two months after hatching, laying eggs, and dying soon after. A similar lifecycle is suspected for Voeltzkow's chameleon, which would explain why the Voeltzkow's chameleon had avoided being rediscovered for so long.

Its habitat is considered to be fragmented, likely qualifying for endangered status on the IUCN Red List.

The specific name is in honour of German biologist Alfred Voeltzkow.
