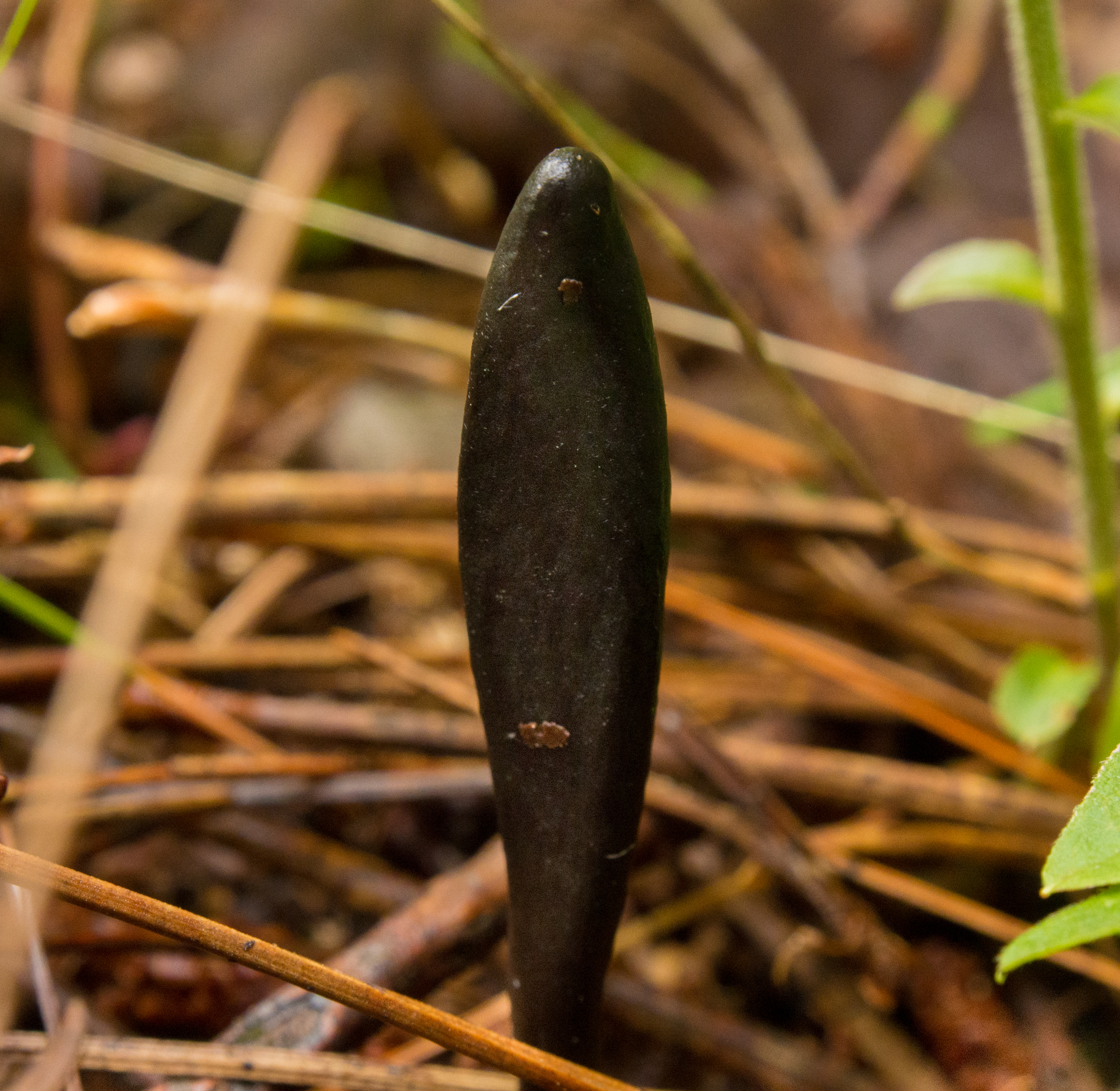

Scientific classification
- Domain: Eukaryota
- Kingdom: Fungi
- Division: Ascomycota
- Class: Geoglossomycetes
- Order: Geoglossales
- Family: Geoglossaceae
- Genus: Geoglossum
- Species: G. difforme

Binomial name
- Geoglossum difforme Fr. (1815)

= Geoglossum difforme =

Species of fungus

Geoglossum difforme is a species of earth tongue fungus in the family Geoglossaceae. It is found in Europe and North America. It is listed as critically endangered in Denmark and endangered in Sweden. It is inedible.
