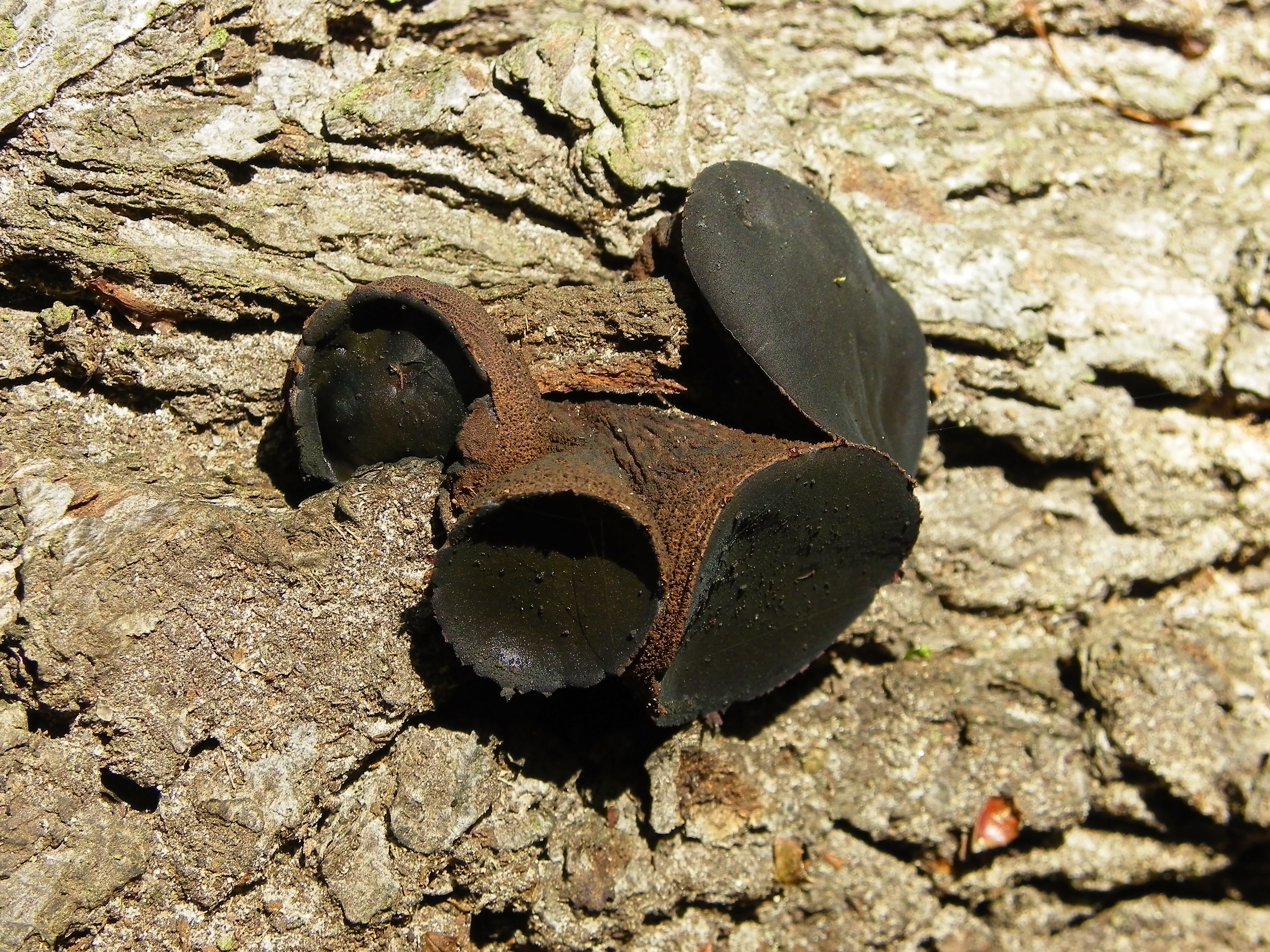
- Bulgaria inquinans

Scientific classification
- Kingdom: Fungi
- Division: Ascomycota
- Class: Leotiomycetes
- Order: Leotiales
- Family: Bulgariaceae; Fr.

Type genus
- Bulgaria Fr.

Genera
- Bulgaria; Holwaya

= Bulgariaceae =

Family of fungi

The Bulgariaceae are a family of fungi in the order Helotiales. Species are found in northern and southern temperate regions. The family contains four genera and seven species.
