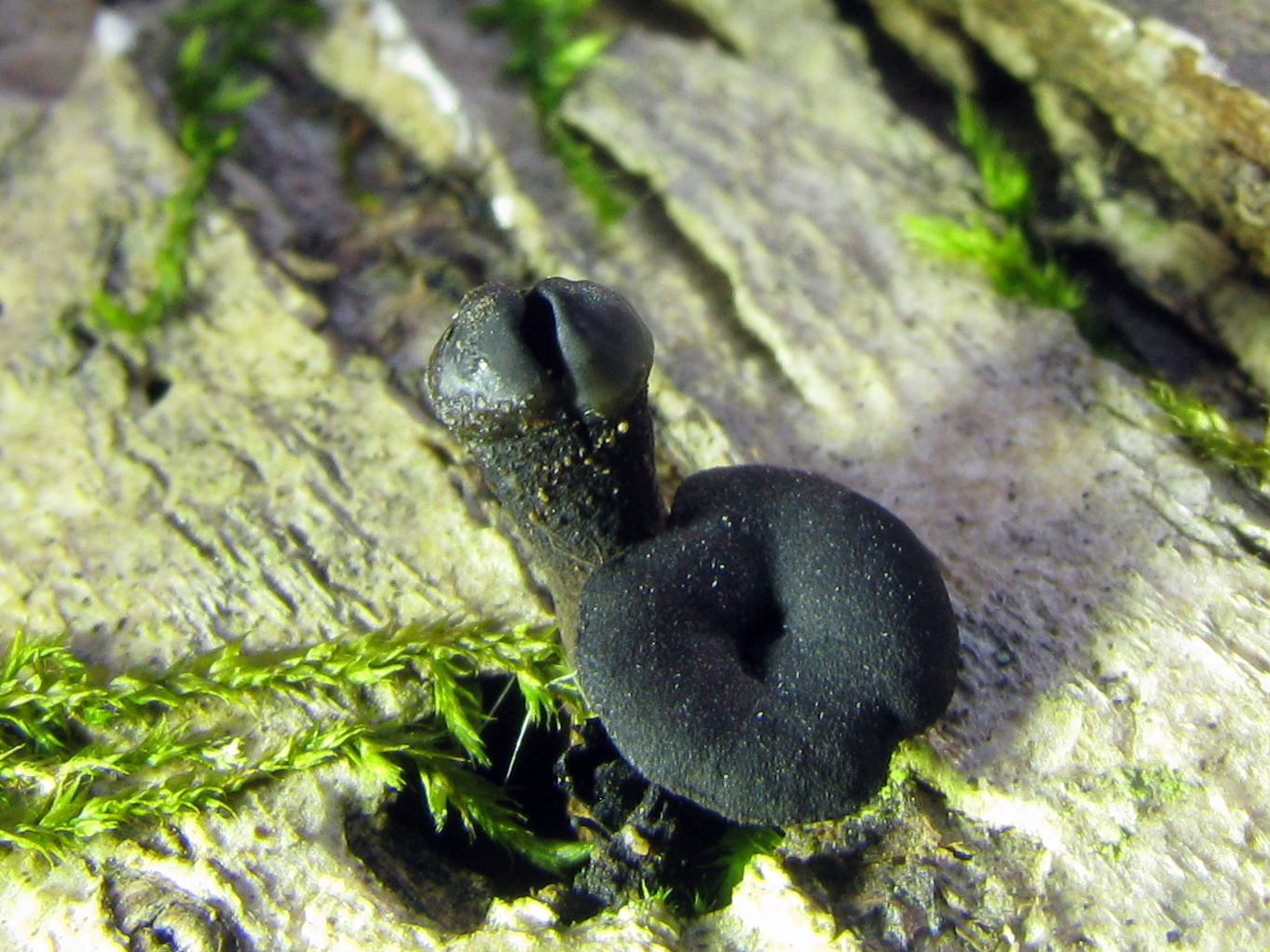
- Holwaya mucida

Scientific classification
- Kingdom: Fungi
- Division: Ascomycota
- Class: Leotiomycetes
- Order: Leotiales
- Family: Bulgariaceae
- Genus: Holwaya; Sacc. (1889)

Type species
- Holwaya ophiobolus (Ellis) Sacc. (1889)

= Holwaya =

Genus of fungi

Holwaya is a genus of fungi in the family Bulgariaceae. Holwaya is monotypic, containing the single species Holwaya mucida, which was originally named Bulgaria ophiobolus by Job Bicknell Ellis in 1883, and later transferred to the newly created Holwaya by Pier Andrea Saccardo in 1889. The genus name of Holwaya is in honour of Edward Willet Dorland Holway (1853-1923), who was an American botanist (Mycology) and Banker.

The genus was circumscribed by Saccardo in Syll. Fung. vol.8 on page 646 in 1889.

Holwaya mucida has an anamorph known as Crinula caliciiformis.
