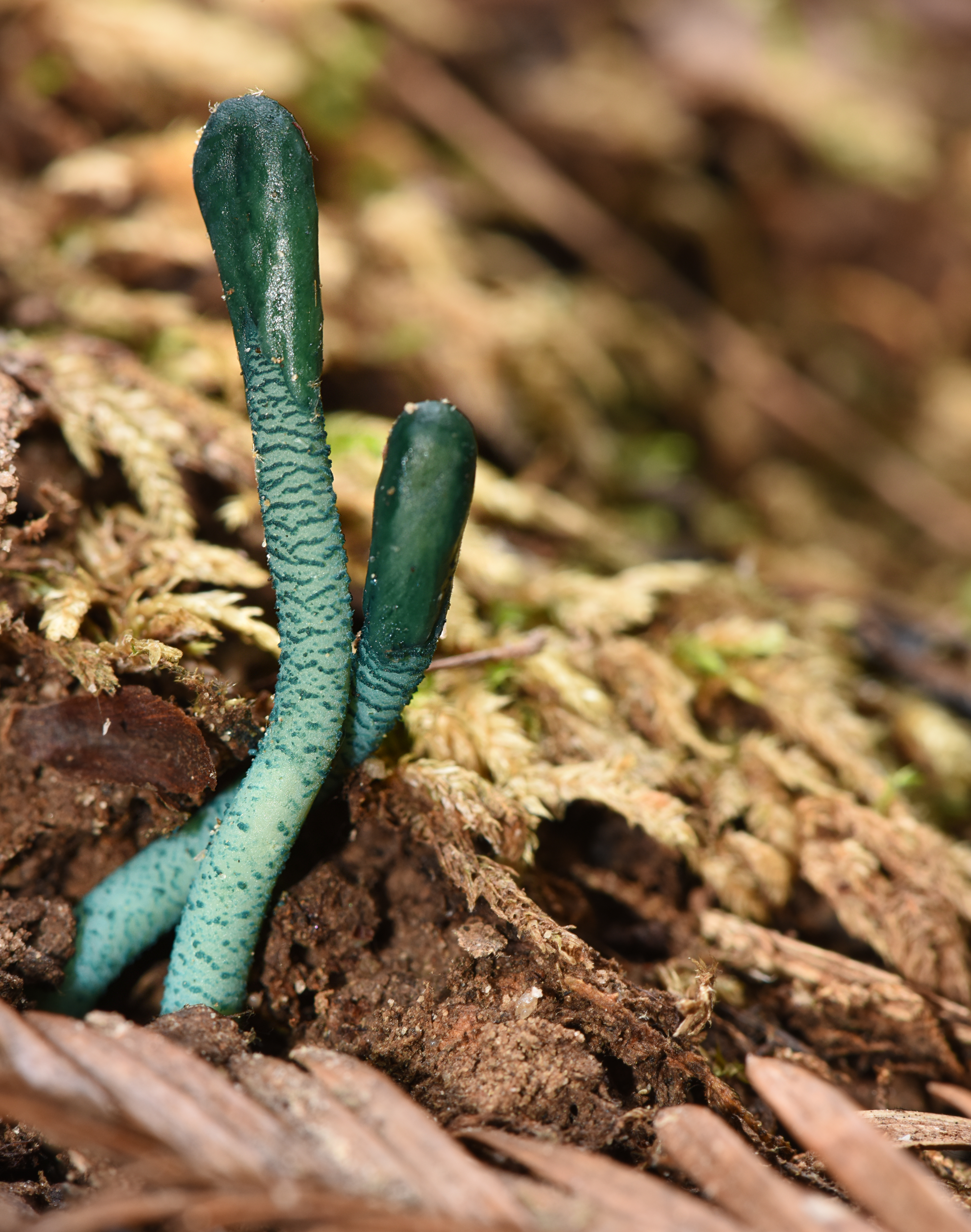
- Microglossum viride

Scientific classification
- Kingdom: Fungi
- Division: Ascomycota
- Class: Leotiomycetes
- Order: Leotiales
- Family: Leotiaceae
- Genus: Microglossum
- Species: M. viride

Binomial name
- Microglossum viride (Pers.) Gillet 1879

= Microglossum viride =

Species of fungus

Microglossum viride
- Mycological characteristics
- Smooth hymenium
- No distinct cap
- Hymenium attachment is irregular or not applicable
- Stipe is bare
- Ecology is saprotrophic

Microglossum viride is a species of fungus in the family Leotiaceae. It is commonly called green earth tongue.

== Taxonomy ==
Microglossum viride was described by Christiaan Hendrik Persoon in 1797 as Geoglossum viride. In 1879 it was moved into the genus Microglossum.

=== Etymology ===
The word Microglossum comes from the Greek words mikrós + glōssa, and literally means "small tongue". The species epithet, viride, comes from the Latin viridis for "green".

== Description ==
It can grow up to 5.5 centimetres (2 1/4 in) tall.

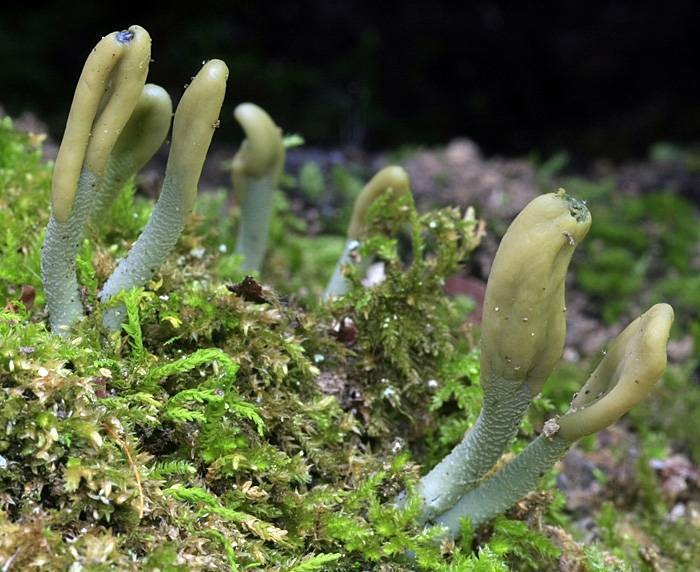
Microglossum viride

=== Similar species ===
Collections of green Microglossum with scaly stipe had been commonly called M. viride. In 2014 morphological and molecular data revealed another taxon hidden under this name that was segregated and described as new, i.e. Microglossum griseoviride (its epithet meaning "grey-green"). Aside of microscopic characters like spore size, they are distinct also macroscopically; true M. viride has yellow to olive colour and prefers wet habitats (e.g. on wet ground around brooks, often among hepatics) whereas M. griseoviride has colder colours, greyish green to bluegreen and grows far from water in litter from broad-leaved trees. There is also a group of green to bluegreen species around Microglossum nudipes that have stipe without scales and can be usually found on grasslands and pastures. As of 2018, ongoing research of their diversity resulted in five new species being recently described from Europe.

== Distribution ==
Microglossum viride is found in woodlands in North America, Australia, and Europe.

== Uses ==
It is considered too small to be of culinary interest.
