= Frigyes Ákos Hazslinszky =

Hungarian mycologist and botanist

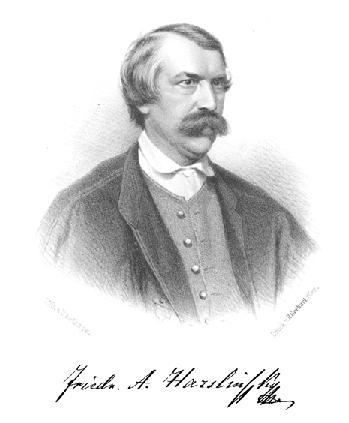
Friedrich August Hazslinszky

Frigyes Ákos Hazslinszky or in German version of his name Friedrich August Hazslinszky von Hazslin (Késmárk Kingdom of Hungary, Austrian Empire (now Slovakia), 6 January 1818 – Eperjes, Kingdom of Hungary, Austria-Hungary (now Slovakia), 16 September 1896) was a Hungarian mycologist and botanist. Upon completing his lyceum studies in Késmark (today Kežmarok, Slovakia), he studied philosophy, law, theology and chemistry, working concurrently as a teacher. After a stint as teacher in Debrecen and Sárospatak, and further studies in Vienna, he became professor of physics and mathematic at the Lutheran College in Eperjes (today Prešov) in 1846.

His scientific interests and contributions centered on the then Northern Hungarian – now Slovakian - flora, in particular one of the Szepesség, Orava and the Tatra Mountains. Hazslinszky published extensively in botany, pteridology and particularly in mycology. He published the first Hungarian plant identification guide in 1864 as well as over a hundred, mostly mycological papers and monographs, among them the monumental Beiträge zur Kenntniss der Flora der Karpathen in 9 parts.

He was a full member of the Hungarian Academy of Sciences.

The genus Hazslinszkya was named in his honour by Gustav Wilhelm Körber in 1861.

== Some taxa commemorating Hazslinszky ==
- Sapindus Hazslinszkyi Ett.
- Ficus Hazslinszkyii Ett.
- Cedrella Hazslinszkyi Ung.
- Ranina Hazslinszkyi Reuss;
- Hazslinszkya gibberulosa Körber,
- Peziza Hazslinszkyi Cooke,
- Cryptospora Hazslinszkyi Rehm.
- Agaricus Hazslinszkyi Schulzer

== Publications ==
- Complete bibliography on Worldcat
