= Christmas tree pests and weeds =

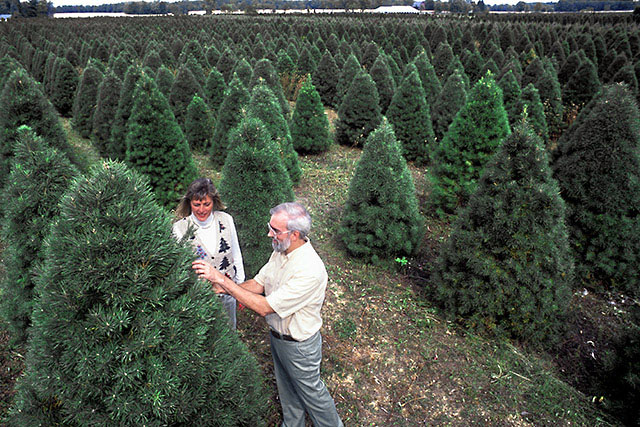
An entomologist checks Scots pine for pine shoot beetles at a Christmas tree farm near East Lansing, Michigan.

Pine and fir trees, grown purposely for use as Christmas trees, are vulnerable to a wide variety of pests, weeds and diseases. Many of the conifer species cultivated face infestations and death from such pests as the balsam woolly adelgid and other adelgids. Aphids are another common insect pest. Christmas trees are also vulnerable to fungal pathogens and their resultant illnesses such as root rot, and, in the U.S. state of California, sudden oak death. Douglas-fir trees in particular are vulnerable to infections from plant pathogens such as R. pseudotsugae.

Larger pests also pose a threat to Christmas tree plantations and harvests. Mammals such as deer, gophers and ground squirrels are threats to Christmas tree crops because of the damage they cause to roots and buds. Certain species of birds are also considered pests, among these is the pine grosbeak which feeds on conifer buds. Herbaceous weeds, as well as woody plants, also compete with Christmas tree crops for water and nutrients and thus must be controlled by farmers. There are several methods of control, including mowing, chemical herbicide use, and tilling.

== Insects ==
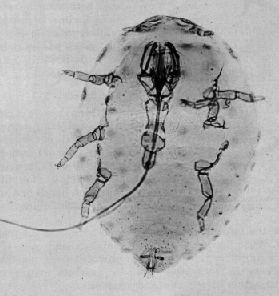
An adult balsam woolly adelgid, a major pest in the Christmas tree industry

The conifer species used and cultivated as Christmas trees are vulnerable to dozens of different pests, most of which cause cosmetic damage to the trees, important in the Christmas tree industry. The balsam woolly adelgid (Adelges picae) are small soft-bodied insects which attack the Fraser fir. The insects appear as white, woolly spots on the tree and are fatal to the fir if left untreated. The woolly adelgid was native to central Europe where it affected the silver fir; it was introduced to the United States, where it has no known native predators, before 1900.

Balsam twig aphids (Mindarus abietnus) are another type of tree pest which affects fir and spruce trees in the spring. The aphids can cause stunted growth in trees with heavy infestations rendering badly damaged trees unsellable. Other species of adelgids also infest fir trees, those include the pine bark adelgid, the Cooley spruce gall adelgid (Adelges cooleyi), and the eastern spruce gall adelgid (Adelges abietis). Another serious pest are bagworms. These pests can defoliate a tree completely if present in large enough numbers. Additionally, the damage caused by the silk of bagworms can last years.

Invasive insect species such as the pine shoot beetle and the spongy moth also threaten Christmas tree crops. Spongy moth infestations in Canada required restrictions and requirements to be placed upon Christmas tree growers with plantations in "spongy moth regulated areas". The restrictions and requirements included ongoing site monitoring, active moth eradication by the grower, accurate record keeping, and government directed moth eradication programs. Failure to abide by the rules could result in revocation of the "approved grower" status from the Canadian Food Inspection Agency.

The major types of conifers cultivated, pines, Douglas-firs, true firs, and spruce trees, are all affected by some types of insect pests. Douglas-firs are most vulnerable to the Cooley spruce gall adelgid. The true firs are most susceptible to insects such as the balsam gall midge (Paradiplosis tumifex), and the balsam twig aphid. Species of spruce trees face assault from insects such as the white pine weevil (Pissodes strobi), Cooley spruce gall adelgid, and the pine needle scale (Chionaspis pinifoliae). The final category of Christmas trees, pines, are commonly susceptible to insect infestation and damage from the pine root collar weevil (Hylobius radicis), Zimmerman pine moth (Dioryctria zimmermani), pine needle scale, and white pine weevil.

== Fungal pests and diseases ==
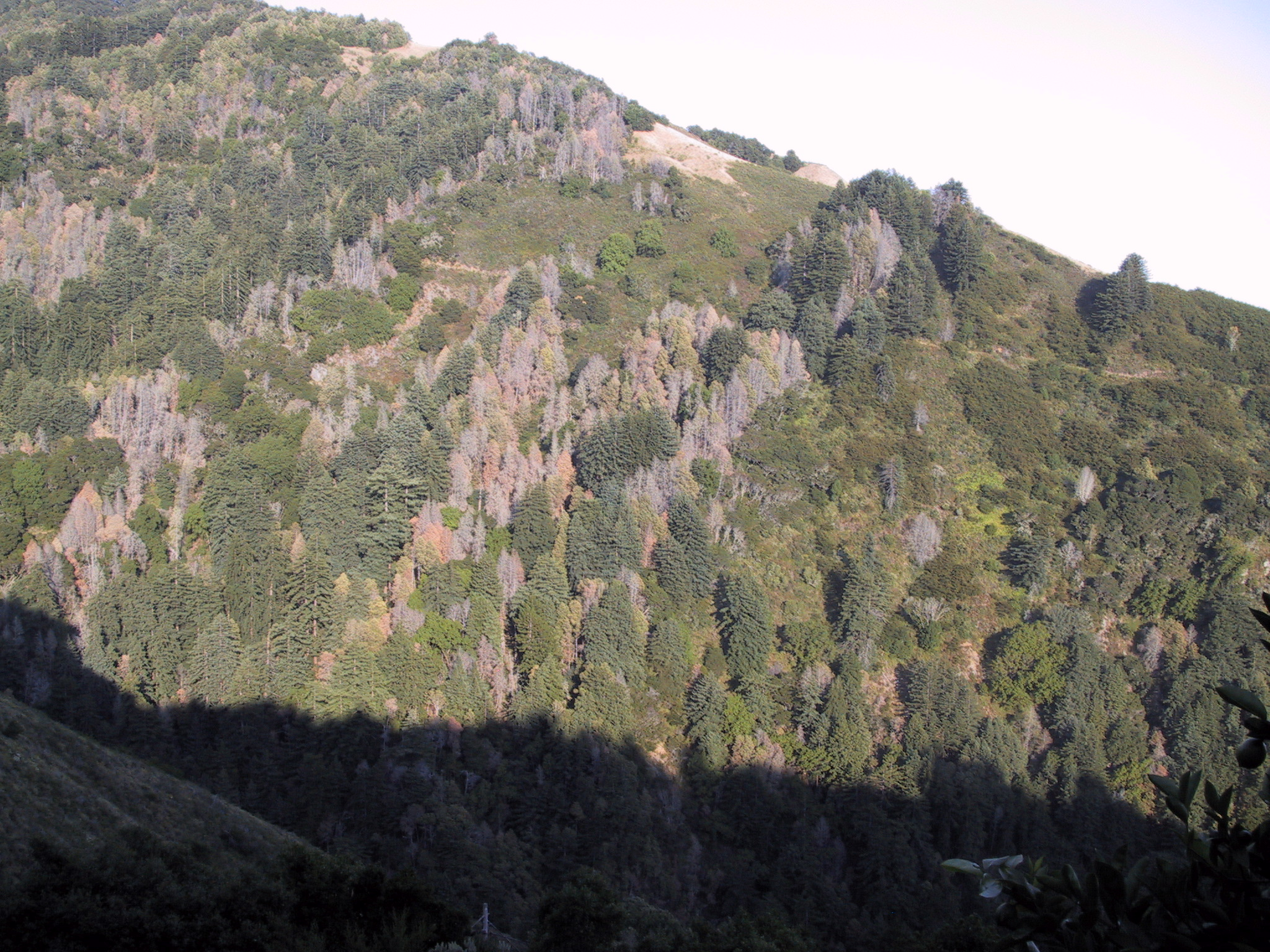
A hillside devastated by sudden oak death includes species of conifer. The disease has been found at California Christmas tree farms.

Christmas trees are also vulnerable to large scale infestations from various fungal pathogens. In 2002 concern in the U.S. Pacific Northwest arose over the spread of a relatively new fungal disease called annosus root rot (Heterobasidion annosum or Fomes annosus). The disease is spread by airborne fungal spores and was first discovered in Northwest Christmas tree farms in 1983.

The plant pathogen, Phytophthora ramorum, which causes "sudden oak death" (SOD), is a fungus-like protist which was identified in the early 1990s. By 2002, sudden oak death had been reported along the California coast and the Oregon Coast, and two species of conifer were identified as hosts of the pathogen, Douglas fir and coast redwood. Between 2003 and 2005 P. ramorum was detected in Douglas fir, grand fir, white fir and California red fir on Christmas trees in Santa Clara County. Camellias imported from California to British Columbia in 2003 and early 2004 caused a significant SOD scare in the horticultural and Christmas tree industries. The detection of P. ramorum led to plant recalls in Canada, and a series of steps meant to quarantine the disease before it spread. The 2003–2004 SOD scare extended to Washington and Oregon nurseries and farms.

Douglas-firs are vulnerable to the two plant pathogens that cause Rhabdocline needle cast, Rhabdocline pseudotsugae, and Rhabdocline weirii. R. weirii affects only Douglas-fir trees. The pathogen often makes Douglas fir trees unsalable as Christmas trees and affects the Christmas tree farming industry. Douglas firs are also affected by Phaeocryptopus gaumanni which causes Swiss needle cast.

Red band needle blight is a fungal disease which affects coniferous trees, particularly pine, with a worldwide distribution. The disease is caused by the fungi Dothistroma septosporum. Since the late 1990s its appearance in the United Kingdom has increased, among the most affected species is Corsican pine and the disease has been a significant problem in Thetford Forest. Though the disease spread rapidly during September 2007 Christmas tree growers remained confident that Christmas tree crops would be unaffected.

== Mammals ==
Small mammals can be significant pests to reforestation site and Christmas tree plantations. Voles, or meadow mice, can cause damage to conifer plantation seedlings. The potential for vole infestation is highest when the land has ample grass and undergrowth coverage; which is often found in plantations and sites that are on old pastures that already have a large vole population. In the U.S. Pacific Northwest, gopher (pocket gopher) damage to conifer seedlings occurs over thousands of acres, causing significant economic loss for the region. Gophers have a tendency to damage root systems as well as strip bark off the base of seedlings. Other mammal pests to Christmas tree farms include, porcupine, rabbit, deer, and thirteen-lined ground squirrel.

== Other pests ==
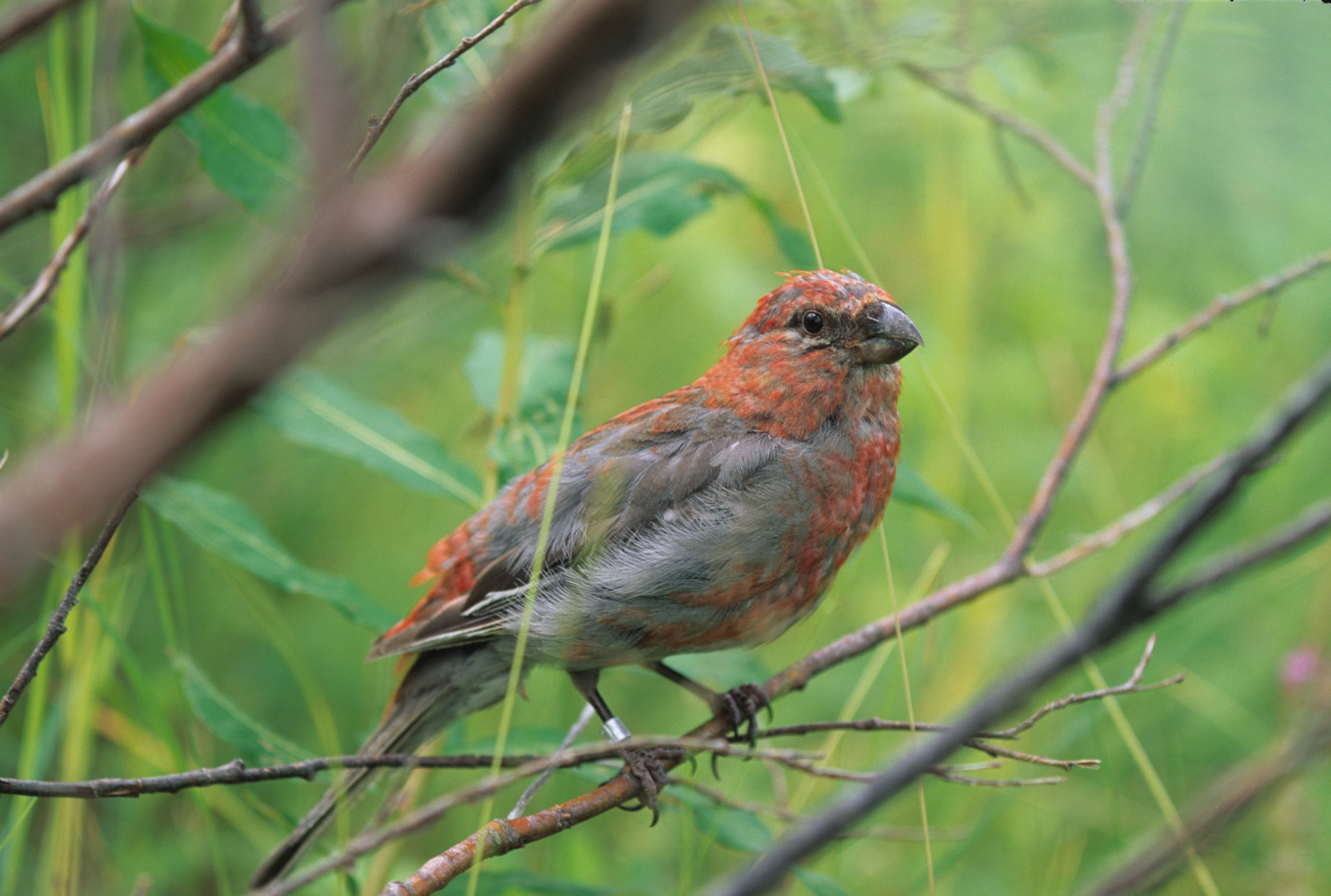
A young pine grosbeak. The bird is regarded as a pest by Christmas tree growers.

Other types of pests which affect Christmas tree production include arachnids such as the spruce spider mites (Oligonychus ununguis), and rust mites (Nalepella).

In addition some species of birds are considered pests by Christmas tree farmers, examples include the pine grosbeak (Pinicola enucleator) and the yellow-bellied sapsucker (Sphrapicus varius). The pine grosbeak feeds on buds on conifers, including Christmas trees, which stunts tree growth, causes abnormal formation, and thins the foliage. The pine grosbeak, as a pest, generally affects Scots pine but also affects eastern white and red pine as well as spruce trees. The yellow-bellied sapsucker, as a Christmas tree pest, is hosted by Scots and Austrian pine trees. The sapsuckers peck holes in sapling bark causing sap to bleed out: potentially killing the trees and allowing insects and pathogens to enter.

== Weeds ==
The types of plants considered weeds in Christmas tree cultivation vary from region to region. Regardless of the types of plants, from herbaceous weeds to woody plants, weeds are considered a pest to Christmas tree farms for several reasons. Seedlings are vulnerable to the competition for water and nutrients presented by weed infestations, however, even established trees can be out competed by weed growth. Some specific weeds cause more serious problems, the bracken fern can increase disease in fir trees, and employee morale and efficiency are decreased when weeds such as poison oak, Canada thistle and wild blackberries infest plantations. In addition, excessive weed growth can provide cover for wildlife, such as deer, gopher and field mice, which can have damaging effects on Christmas tree crops.

== Control ==
=== Weed control ===
One of the primary methods of weed control in the Christmas tree farming industry is through the use of chemical herbicides. The use of herbicides and other pesticides is one of the key reasons Christmas tree farms have met with opposition from environmentalists. In applying herbicides growers must determine proper spray volume and timing. There are different types of herbicides that are used to control different types of weeds, they fall into two different categories. Soil applied herbicides combat germinating seedlings, and some offer control of newly established plants. Uniform application over the soil followed by moisture are required for soil applied herbicides to work effectively. Foilar-active herbicides control weed growth of already established, actively growing plants. Application of foliar-active herbicides requires farmers to avoid contact with the conifers.

=== Mechanical and biological control ===
Non-chemical methods of weed control include rotary mowing and flailing. Rotary mowing is designed to cut unwanted vegetation 5–7 cm (2–3 inches) above the surface of the soil while flailing cuts the vegetation near the soil surface. This method of weed control reduces the loss of soil moisture and nutrients by reducing the size and the growth of the weeds. The act of cultivation disturbs weed growth, especially in the seedling phase, as well by disrupting the soil around roots. Another method of combating problem weeds, in areas that have not responded to other control methods, is the practice of spot hoeing or tilling.

Insect infestations in low numbers can be physically picked or knocked off of trees by hand. Certain insect infestations such as Zimmerman pine moth larvae infestations, can have infected limbs cut off of specific trees or controlled burns of infected plots to prevent infestation spread.

For larger pests, establishing natural predators of infestations can be an effective tool at keep infestation numbers low, with the additional benefit of being both more sustainable and a longer term solution to pest management. This can be achieved mechanically, such as through audio recordings of predator birds played near trees, or biologically by introducing predators, such as lady bugs to eat aphids, to the tree nursery. Local predators in the area can be encouraged into nurseries by leaving untrimmed edges of plot land near nurseries, as many parasites to common tree pests need nectar or pollen from flowers during a portion of their life cycle.

=== Chemical insecticide use ===
Given the effectiveness of using a variety of controls together in moderation, as opposed to an intensive single step process common with chemical controls, chemical controls are now recommended as only a last resort in pest management.

== See also ==
- Christmas tree cultivation
- List of Douglas-fir diseases
