= Christmas tree cultivation =

Cultivation of trees used as Christmas trees

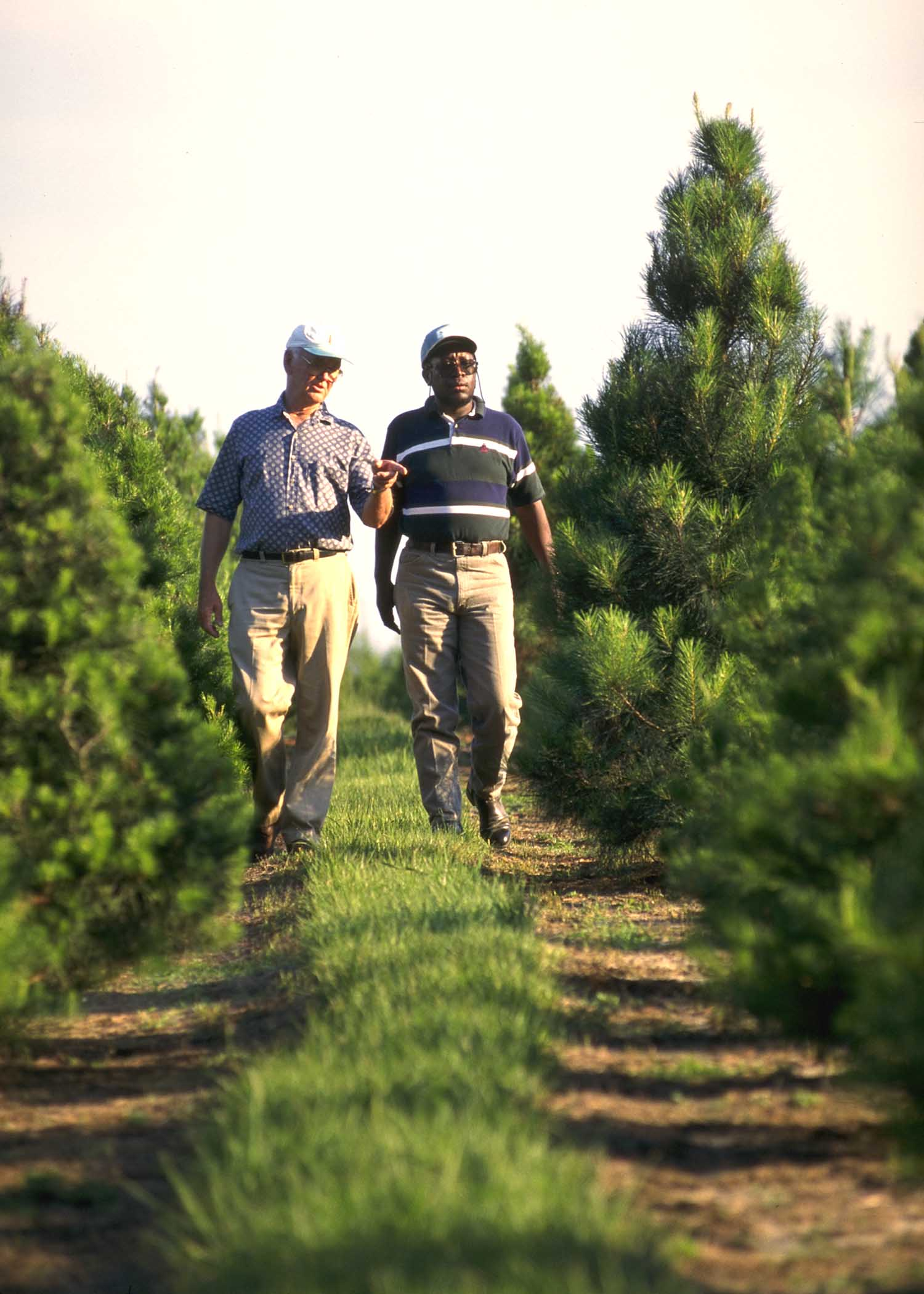
A Christmas tree farmer in the U.S. state of Florida explains the pruning and shearing process of cultivation to a government employee.

Christmas tree cultivation is an agricultural, forestry, and horticultural occupation which involves growing pine, spruce, and fir trees specifically for use as Christmas trees.

The first Christmas tree farm was established by 1860 in Maine, but most consumers continued to obtain their trees from forests until the 1930s and 1940s. Christmas tree farming was once seen only as a viable alternative for low-quality farmland, but that perception has changed within the agriculture industry. For optimum yield and quality, land should be flat or gently rolling and relatively free of debris and undergrowth.

A wide variety of pine and fir species are grown as Christmas trees, although a handful of varieties stand out in popularity. In the United States, Douglas-fir, Scots pine and Fraser fir all sell well. Nordmann fir and Norway spruce sell well in the United Kingdom, the latter being popular throughout Europe. Like all conifers, Christmas trees are vulnerable to a range of pests.

The final stage of cultivation, harvesting, is carried out in a number of ways; one of the more popular methods is the pick-your-own tree farm, where customers are allowed to roam the farm, select their tree, and cut it down themselves. Other farmers cultivate potted trees, with balled roots, which can be replanted after Christmas and used again the following year.

== History ==
The practice of cultivating evergreens specifically to sell as Christmas trees dates back to at least 1860, when Maine Christmas tree farmers Thomas W. Jackson Jr. and his son Herbert A. Jackson of Portland were selling Christmas trees in New York City. In 1901, a 25,000-tree Norway spruce farm was sown near Trenton, New Jersey. The commercial market for Christmas trees had started 50 years earlier when a farmer from the Catskill Mountains brought trees into New York City to sell. Despite these pioneering efforts, most people still obtained wild-grown Christmas trees from forests into the 1930s and 1940s. More trees were grown in plantations after World War II, and by the 1950s, farmers were shearing and pruning trees to meet customer demands. The Christmas tree market burgeoned through the 1960s and 1970s, but from the late 1980s onward, prices and the market for natural Christmas trees declined. In the early 21st century, nearly 98% of all natural (not artificial) Christmas trees sold worldwide were grown on tree farms. In the 1990s decade, American singer-songwriter Taylor Swift grew up in Pine Ridge Farm, a farm in West Reading, Pennsylvania, later mentioned as Christmas Tree Farm in her song of the same name.

== Cultivation ==
=== Land and climate ===
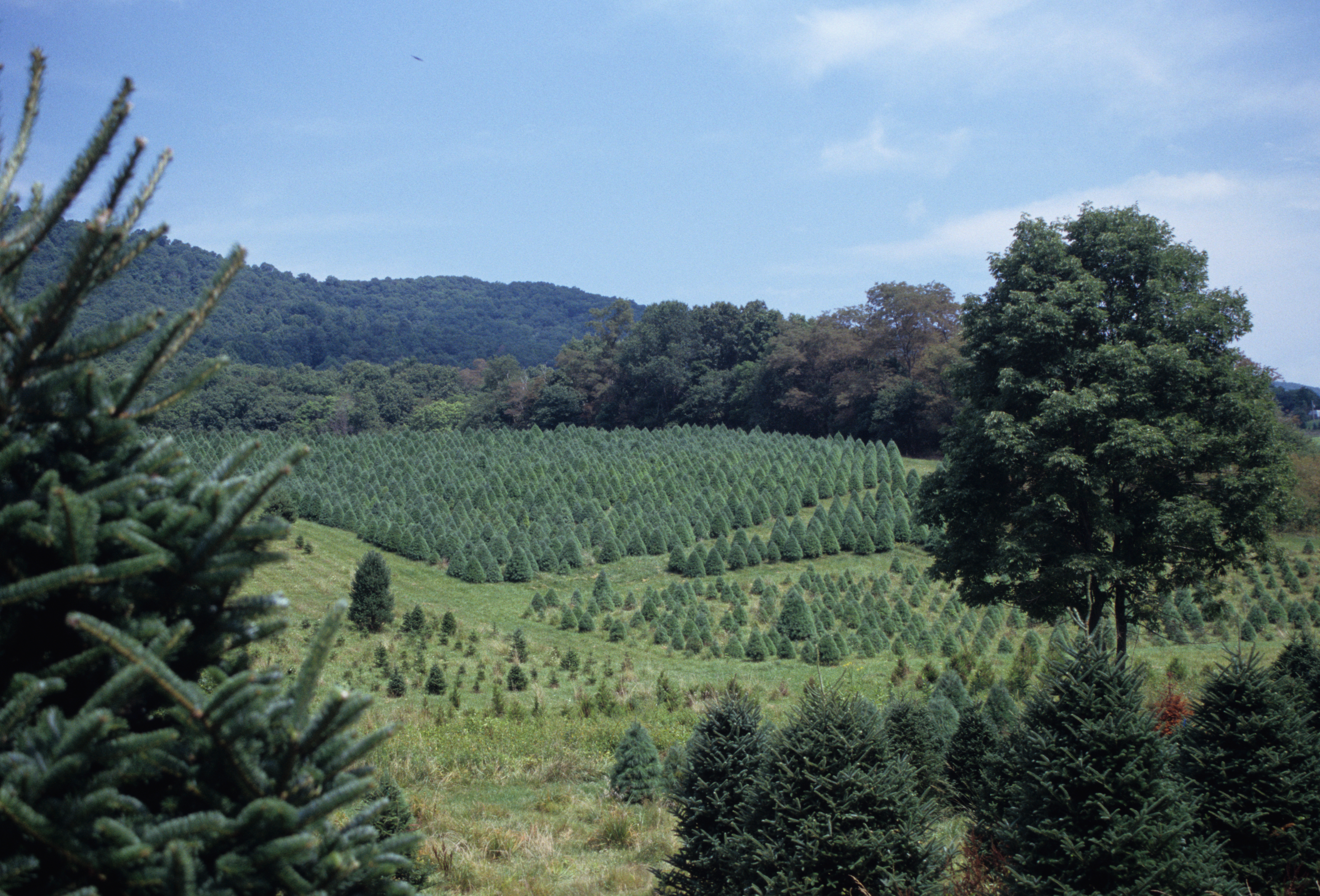
This Christmas tree farm in southern Virginia is situated in a gently rolling valley.

Christmas tree farms are best located on relatively level land that is free of obstructions. In the past, Christmas tree farmers established their plantations on less desirable agricultural plots or "wastelands of agriculture". However, emphasis in modern Christmas tree farming has shifted toward the production of higher-quality trees, and increasing land quality expectations. Indeed, some species of trees, such as the Fraser fir, are unable to grow on low-quality, marginal farmland. Flat or gently rolling land is preferred to that with steep slopes and inclines, which is prone to erosion and fluctuations in fertility. Noticeable obstructions, such as rocks, fences, or significant underbrush, are also undesirable.

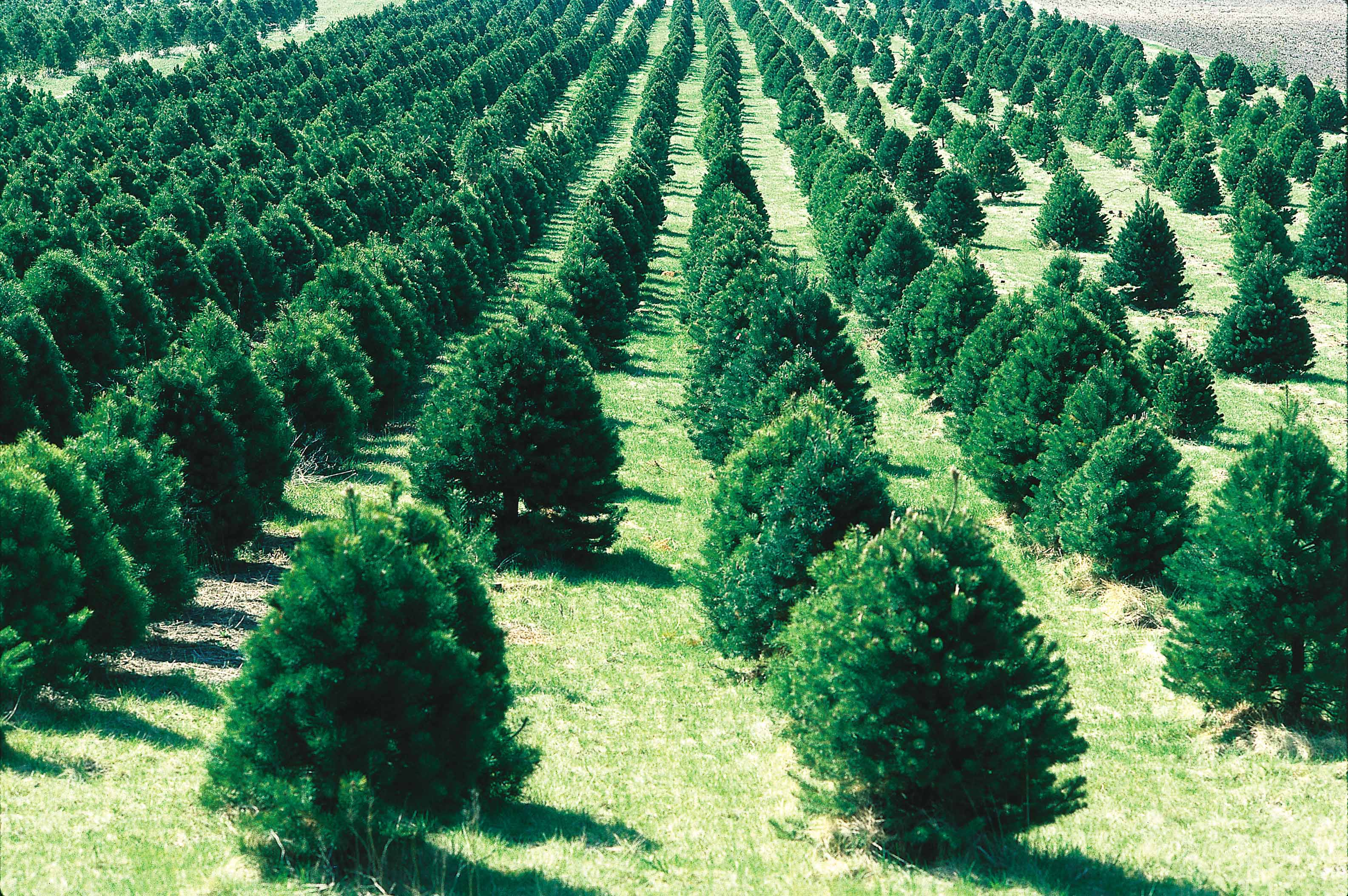
This Christmas tree farm in Iowa is located on flat ground and has well-mowed rows between the trees.

Like all crops and plants, Christmas trees require a specific set of nutrients to thrive. Some 16 elements are crucial for growth; of those, three are obtained through air and water: hydrogen, carbon, and oxygen. Nitrogen, phosphorus, potassium, calcium, magnesium, sulfur, boron, copper, chlorine, manganese, molybdenum, iron, and zinc are obtained from the soil. If the necessary elements are not available in the local soil, nutritious fertilizers are used. Other important soil considerations include pH and drainage. Certain types of soil are preferable, depending on the type of tree. Pine trees are usually better adapted to a sandy or sandy loam soil, while white spruce trees and fir trees, such as the Douglas fir, prefer fine-texture loams and clay loam soils. Some trees grow well in all types of soil, but in any case, the land must be well-drained for a Christmas tree farm to have a chance of thriving.

The weather, as with other agricultural endeavors, plays a key outcome in the yield of a Christmas tree farm. Severe cold in the winter and extreme hot and dry conditions during and after harvest can cause irreparable damage to the crop. Early snow can make both harvesting and shipping trees difficult or impossible.

=== Labor and equipment ===
Christmas tree farming is a labor-intensive process. Depending on the quality of the land, bulldozing may need to be undertaken prior to planting, to remove obstacles such as large trees or rocks. If the volume of undergrowth requires it, the soil may be tilled; tilling can help remove any debris remaining after tree or weed removal. Both woody plants and herbaceous weeds must be controlled prior to planting; this is most often done by application of a chemical herbicide. In addition, some types of fertilizers must be introduced into the soil prior to planting. The work done before planting tree seedlings plays an important role in the overall success of a Christmas tree crop.

After the trees are in the ground, work on the crop continues. Animal pests (especially insects) and diseases must be monitored and controlled, and weed growth must also be minimized. Many species of pine and fir require pruning and shearing two to four years after planting to maintain the classic Christmas tree shape. Late or omitted pruning can result in trees that are unmarketable due to large gaps in needle coverage. Some species of pine, such as the Scots pine, are susceptible to dormant season "yellowing", which is generally countered with a green dye or paint.

The outlay of money on equipment varies greatly. Some items commonly found on Christmas tree farms are insecticide sprayers, tractors, and shaper sheers. Mechanized planters, at a cost of about US$4,000, are not essential but a work-saving luxury for farmers. Farmers can purchase seedlings, the lifeblood of a Christmas tree farm, from nurseries. One farmer in Oregon purchased seedlings for US$200–300 per 1,000 plants. The farmer, a wholesaler, sold his final products for about $20 each; after the cost of the trees and other expenses, a profit of $2–3 per tree.

=== Trees ===
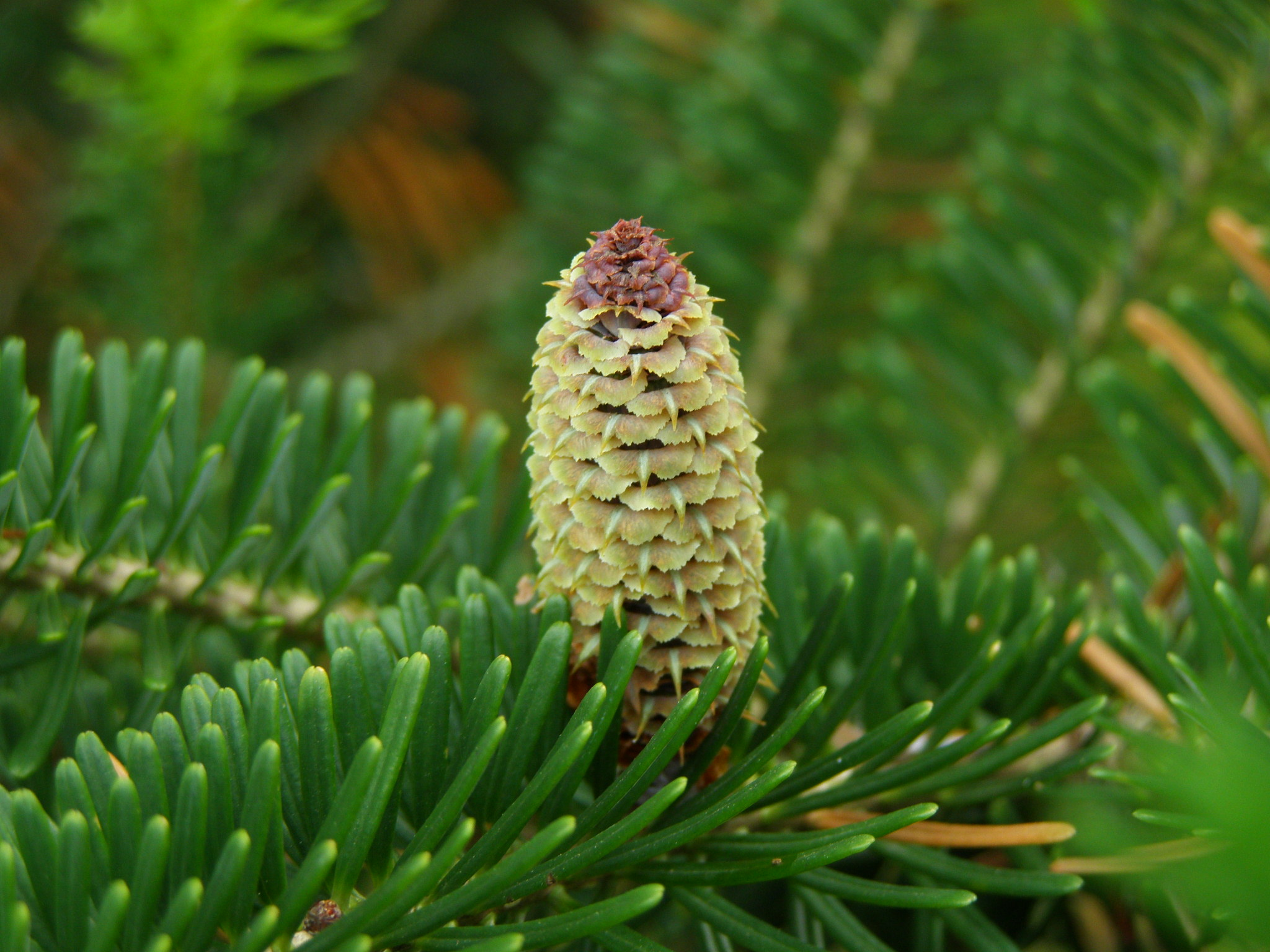
Fraser fir (cone and foliage pictured) is a popular species of Christmas tree in both the United States and Great Britain.

The best-selling species in the North American market are Scots pine, Douglas Fir, Noble Fir, balsam fir, Fraser fir, Virginia pine, and eastern white pine, although other types of trees are also grown and sold. In Alabama, for example, types of trees grown for use as Christmas trees include eastern white pine, Red Cedar, Virginia pine, Leyland cypress, and Arizona cypress. In Florida, the sand pine and spruce pine are among the 20,000 grown in the state each year.

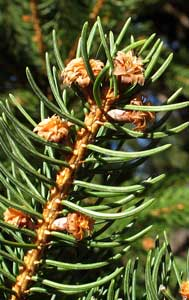
Norway spruce is a popular Christmas tree species in Europe.

In Great Britain, Nordmann fir is a popular species, largely due to its needle-retention qualities. Other popular trees in Britain are Norway spruce, Serbian spruce, and Scots pine, the last of which is slightly rarer; it has sharp needles that do not shed easily.

In the U.S. Pacific Northwest, a major Christmas tree growing region, Douglas fir has always been the primary species grown. A full one-half of all trees produced in the Pacific Northwest are Douglas fir. Douglas firs typically take five to seven years before they are mature enough to sell as Christmas trees. Also common in the region are noble fir, a tree that commands a higher price than Douglas fir, and grand fir, which accounts for about 10% of the annual harvest in the Northwest. Other species collectively account for only 3–5% of the total Northwest harvest.

In North America, Fraser fir, grown in the Appalachian Mountains of North Carolina, has been called the "Cadillac of Christmas Trees", as well as the "most popular and most valuable of Christmas tree species". In the Southern United States, Virginia pine is a popular Christmas tree species. In Canada, white pine, white spruce, Scots pine, blue spruce, and Fraser fir are commonly cultivated. In the province of Ontario, Scots pine has always dominated both the domestic and export markets. Other regions of the world also have different favorites of natural Christmas trees, and Christmas tree farms reflect these; In Europe, Norway spruce is popular.

=== Pests, disease and weeds ===
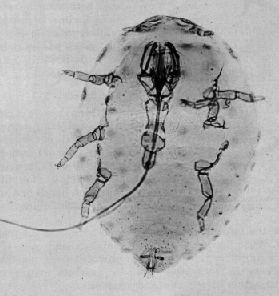
An adult balsam woolly adelgid, a major pest in the Christmas tree industry

Many of the conifer species cultivated face infestations and death from such pests as the balsam woolly adelgid, other adelgids, and aphids. Invasive insect species, such as the pine shoot beetle and the gypsy moth, also threaten Christmas tree crops. Christmas trees are also vulnerable to fungal pathogens, resulting in such illnesses as root rot, and, in California, Washington, Oregon and British Columbia sudden oak death. Douglas-fir trees are especially vulnerable to infections from plant pathogens such as R. pseudotsugae and Rhabdocline weirii; R. weirii affects only Douglas fir trees. The pathogen often makes Douglas fir trees unsaleable as Christmas trees and heavily affects the Christmas tree farming industry.

Mammals such as deer, gophers, and ground squirrels are also threats to Christmas tree crops, due to the damage they cause to roots and buds. Certain species of birds are also considered pests, including the pine grosbeak, which feeds on conifer buds, usually affecting Scots pine but also affecting eastern white pine and red pine, as well as spruce trees. Herbaceous weeds, as well as woody plants, also compete with Christmas tree crops for water and nutrients, necessitating control methods including mowing, chemical herbicide use, and tilling.

=== Quality ===
USDA Christmas Tree Grades
Grade	Requirements
U.S. Premium	Fresh, clean, healthy, heavy density, one minor defect allowed
U.S. No. 1	Fresh, fairly clean, healthy, medium density, two minor defects allowed
U.S. No. 2	Fresh, fairly clean, healthy, light density, three minor defects allowed

Christmas tree quality grades have been in place since 1965 in Ontario, Canada, and were included under the provincial Farm Products Grades and Sales Act. While the grades in Ontario are law, in the United States the grading system is not mandated. In fact, it is common for U.S. growers to develop their own grading systems. The grading systems established by individual jurisdictions are often in the spirit of the U.S. Department of Agriculture's (USDA) grading scheme, even if they are not entirely based upon them. The Department of Agriculture's United States Standards for Grades of Christmas Trees took effect on October 30, 1989, covering "sheared or unsheared trees of the coniferous species which are normally marketed as Christmas trees".

=== Harvest ===
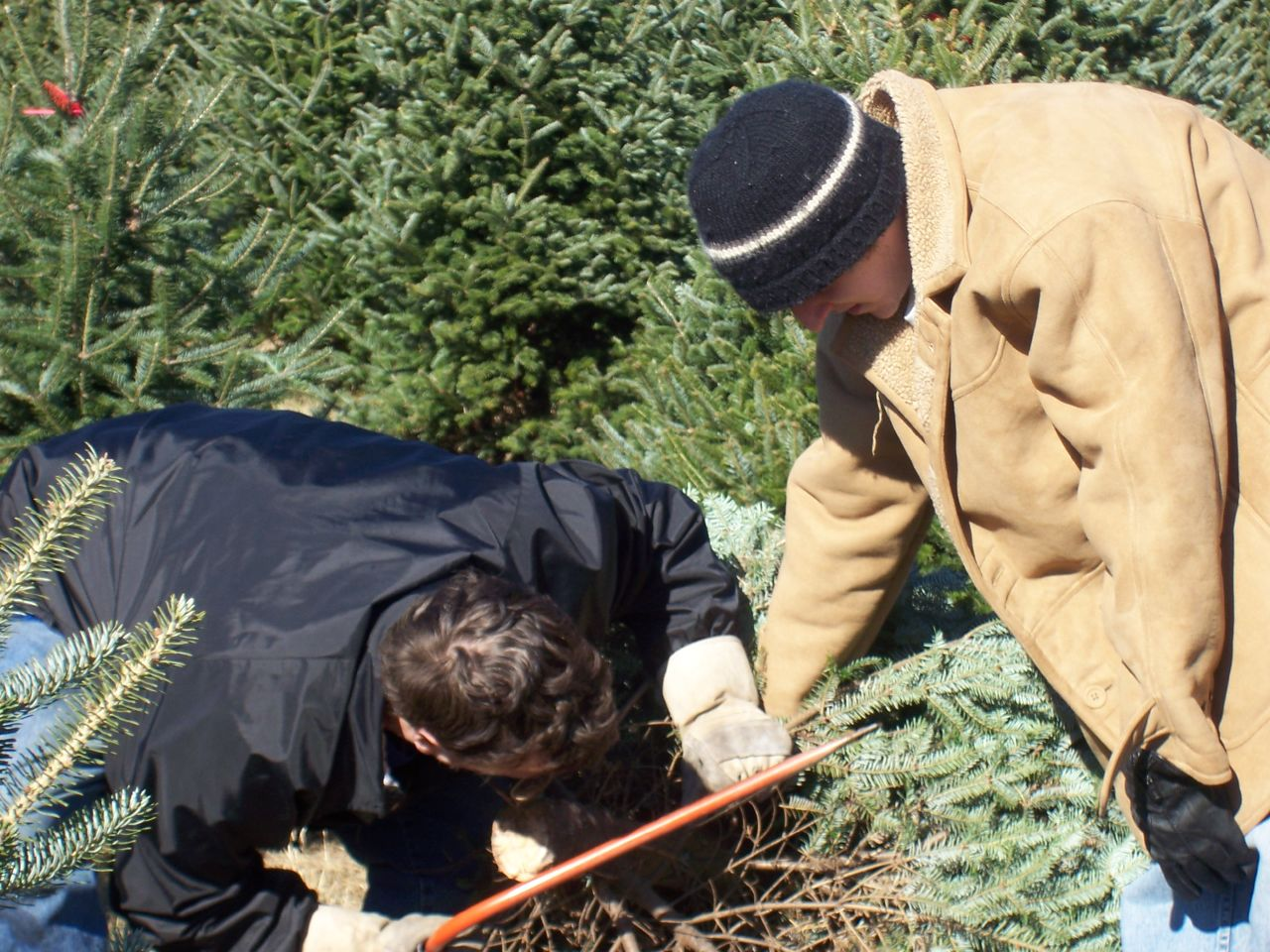
Customers, armed with a saw, at a typical "choose-and-cut" Christmas tree farm

Christmas trees can be harvested and marketed in different ways. Some operations are known as "choose-and-cut" or pick-your-own farms, which allow customers to walk through the planted land, select their Christmas tree and cut down themselves. Wholesale operations are more labor-intensive because they usually require the farmer to complete tasks such as baling, cutting, moving the trees to a roadside pick-up, and loading the harvest. In addition, this work must be completed during a very short period in November. Growers also harvest trees by digging and balling the root and selling the trees as nursery stock or as live, reusable Christmas trees. This last option allows trees to be harvested earlier than the usual six- to ten-year period required to grow a mature Christmas tree.

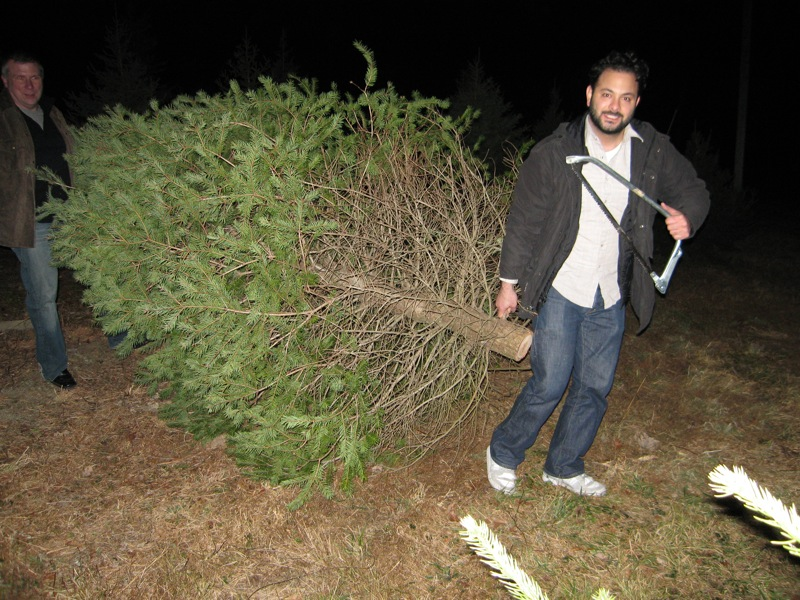
Customers haul their own purchases off-site at choose-and-cut farms.

Larger farms began using helicopters to move tree harvests during the 1980s. One 1,200-acre (490 ha) farm in Oregon lacked road access, so it began using helicopters to move up to 200,000 Christmas trees per year. Helicopters reduce the amount of time between harvesting and market, cutting it from up to two weeks down to as little as three days.

Not all natural Christmas trees harvested are grown on plantations. In British Columbia, Canada, for example, most of the 900,000 trees harvested for use as Christmas trees came from native pine and fir stands. The British Columbia Ministry of Forests and Ranges allows any resident of the province to cut a Christmas tree for free from Crown Lands, provided the individual receive prior permission in writing from a forest officer. In the United States, the U.S. Forest Service and the Bureau of Land Management offer permits for individual tree cutting on government land, mostly within the National Forest system.

=== Farmers ===
The people who operate Christmas tree farms range from full-time growers to part-time farmers. One farmer in Minnesota, who began planting Christmas trees in 1967, gave his trees away for free from his modest 1-acre (4,000 m^{2}) farm for ten years before establishing a tree farming business. Other farmers started growing Christmas trees as a supplemental income for retirement or college funds, or they worked farms that were not originally established as Christmas tree farms.

Various national growers' associations have been founded in Christmas tree producing nations. In the United Kingdom, the British Christmas Tree Growers Association is a trade association open to membership from Christmas tree farmers in Great Britain and Northern Ireland. The National Christmas Tree Association serves a similar function in the United States. Most recently, a new trade group was formed that focuses on the critical role Christmas tree distributors or "Brokers" play in the supply of Christmas trees. The Association of Real Christmas Tree Merchants was formed in 2022 and as of July 2024, has close to 3,000 members.

== Environmental effect ==
In the United States, the National Christmas Tree Association (NCTA) promotes the environmental benefits of live Christmas trees over the competing artificial alternative. The NCTA stated that every acre of Christmas trees in production produced the daily oxygen requirement for 18 people; with 500,000 acres (200,000 ha) in production in the U.S. alone, that amounts to oxygen for 9 million people per day. The NCTA also stated that the farms help to stabilize the soil, protect water supplies and provide wildlife habitat. In addition, the industry points to the reduction of carbon dioxide through Christmas tree farming. An independent Life Cycle Assessment (LCA) study, conducted by a firm of experts in sustainable development, states that a natural tree will generate 3.1 kg of greenhouse gases whereas the artificial tree will produce 8.1 kg per year.

A 1998 report from the Michigan State University Agricultural Experiment Station predicted increasing environmental concerns about tree production and use as one possible reason people may favor artificial trees in the future. The report cited the use of fertilizers and pesticides and increasing concerns regarding tree disposal as the chief elements in its prediction. Critics of tree farming have raised the concerns highlighted in the 1998 report, as well as other issues, such as the effect that large-scale tree farming operations have on biodiversity. Pesticide use on Christmas tree farms is one of the main concerns of environmentalists; fir trees are vulnerable to a wide array of pests and diseases which requires the use of pesticides and other chemicals including the widely used herbicide glyphosate. Glyphosate is commonly used in Christmas tree production in the U.S. state of North Carolina, where studies have found traces of agricultural chemicals in homes and tree industry workers' urine samples. The average Christmas tree receives roughly a half of an ounce (14 g) of pesticide over its lifetime.

The BBC's "Gardening" website called buying Christmas trees directly from the farm, "the most environmentally friendly way of getting a tree". Other positive environmental attributes have been given live Christmas trees as well. Researchers at the University of Nebraska–Lincoln included the reuse of natural Christmas trees as mulch and, in larger quantities, piled up as soil erosion barriers, among the benefits of live tree use. Other positive reuses included fish habitat in private ponds and backyard bird feeders.

== Research ==
Since 2004, several researchers at Oregon State University's (OSU) College of Forestry have researched various aspects of Christmas tree cultivation. In the Department of Forest Resources, Rick Fletcher is researching Christmas tree genetics, fertilization and disease management, while Chad Landgren is concentrating his emphasis on Christmas tree genetics and disease management. Both men are doing their research in the Silviculture and Ecology Section of the department. In OSU's Department of Forest Science, Mike Bondi is conducting ongoing research into Christmas tree fertilization, productivity and genetics, as well as natural and artificial regeneration systems. During the mid-1990s, the trio's research was primarily focused on creating better Christmas tree seed stock, resulting in a higher percentage of quality mature trees, through genetic improvements. Similar research has been conducted by the Agricultural Experiment Station at New Mexico State University.

U.S. institutions in other Christmas tree producing locales have also undertaken their own research programs. North Carolina State University has several full-time staff dedicated to all aspects of tree production. Specialties at N.C. State cross several academic departments and range from a Christmas tree genetics program to providing material support for growers in areas such as sustainable agriculture and pest management.

The Christmas Tree Research Center in Bible Hill, Nova Scotia does research on Balsam firs for Canadian producers.

== Industry classification ==
Activities related to the cultivation of Christmas trees require cross-disciplinary (forestry, horticulture, and agriculture) skills and fall into different specialty categories. Under the terms of Title 29 of the United States Code, which defines federal regulations pertaining to the United States Department of Labor, Christmas tree planting, tending and cutting are specifically not "farming operations". The U.S. Farm Service Agency (FSA) does not provide federal crop insurance for Christmas tree crops, however, there is an alternative program, through the FSA, which provides assistance for non-insured crops. The U.S. Census Bureau, responsible for the Agriculture Census until 1997, excluded Christmas tree farms as farms from its reports. When the Census of Agriculture authority was shifted to the U.S. Department of Agriculture in 1997 the differences in definition were resolved and the Census of Agriculture included Christmas tree farms.

The status of Christmas tree farms as actual, by definition, farms, and their products thus agricultural in nature, has evolved in the various government agencies responsible for such categorization. In both Canada, and the United States the governments take a regular Census of Agriculture, reporting in these censuses relies on the classifications. Beginning in 1996, the Canadian government included Christmas tree farms in its Census of Agriculture concerning the issue of net farm income and farm cash receipts. The changes also included the addition of egg hatcheries to the census. The results were marginal with net cash farm income rising just 0.1 percent.

In the United Kingdom, Christmas trees do not fall into the category of enterprises included in farm profits. Instead, Christmas tree farms are classified as "market gardens". Market gardens are defined separately from farming and are nurseries or gardens used for the sale of produce other than hops. However, in Northern Ireland, some Christmas trees are cultivated and harvested by the Forest Service.

== Cultural significance ==
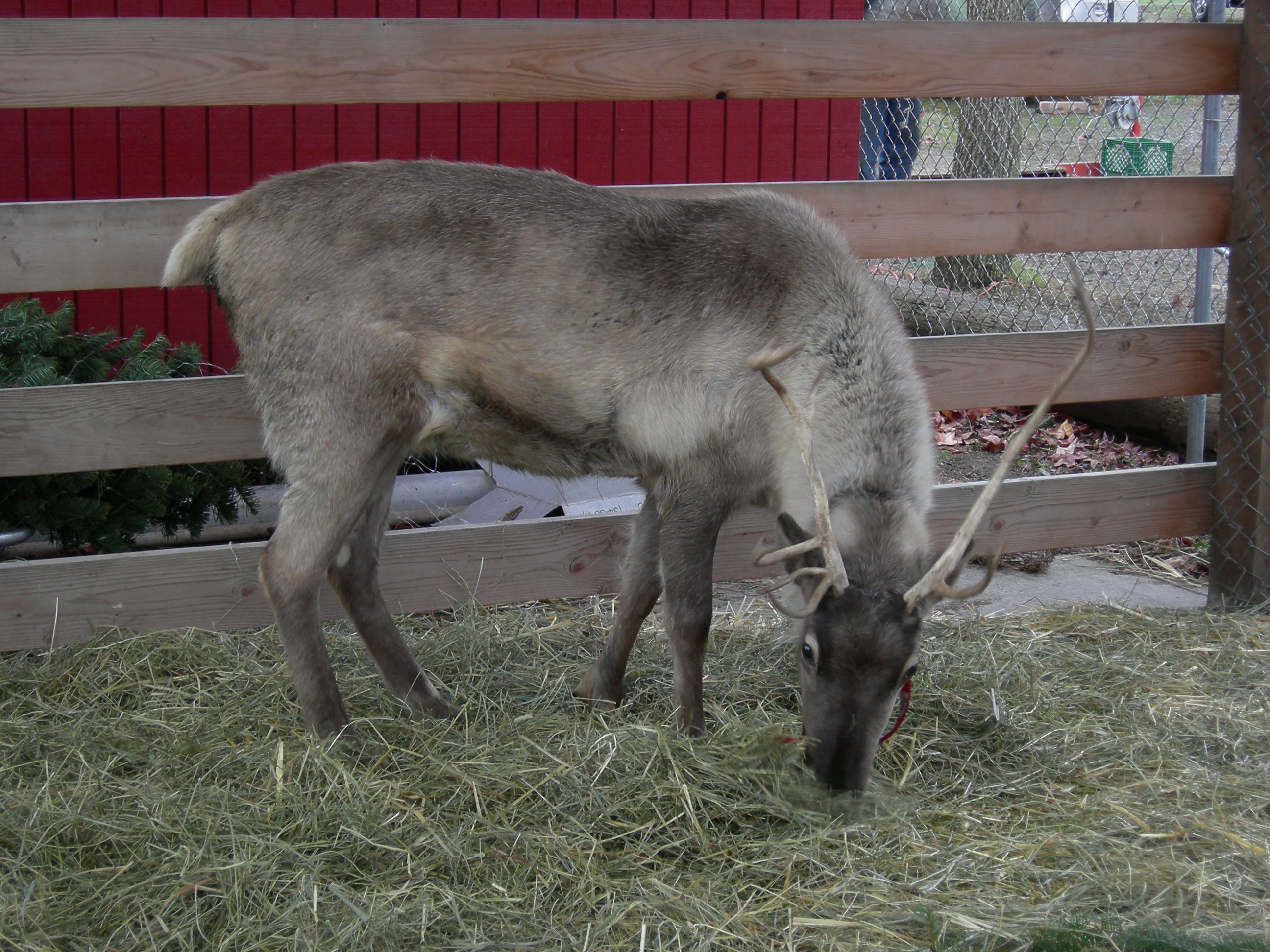
This reindeer, at a tree farm in Seattle, is part of the holiday-themed extras offered by many Christmas tree farms.

In the United States, visits to Christmas tree farms have become a Christmas holiday tradition for people. Christmas tree farms have embraced this trend; at one Minnesota tree farm it has become tradition for customers to pose for snapshots with their trees, when they return in subsequent years they can check the "wall of memories" for their photo. Other tree farms have served the same families for multiple generations, becoming a part of each group's holiday traditions. In 2006, New York state Agriculture Commissioner Patrick H. Brennan, supported the virtues of purchasing Christmas trees from local Christmas tree farms. In a statement released to support New York Christmas tree growers he stated,

It is a tradition in my family to visit our local tree farm and harvest our family's Christmas tree. It is a wonderful event for the whole family and if you don't already do so, I encourage you to share this tradition with your family. –NY Agriculture Commissioner Patrick H. Brennan, 2006

Some tree farms offer more than just a chance to cut down a live Christmas tree. Outdoor and holiday themed activities are not uncommon and include wagon rides, offering hot cocoa or cider, Santa Claus visits and holiday crafts. Many tree farms actively encourage schools to sponsor field trips to the farms. One grower in Kansas contended that usual worries for businesses, such as a tight economy, do not affect Christmas tree farms. The grower thought that obtaining a tree from a Christmas tree farm was something that almost nothing could stop; an activity that transcended the economy and the weather.

== See also ==
- Christmas tree production in the United States
- Energy forestry
- Festive ecology
- Forestry
- Hanukkah bush
- Holiday tree
- New Year tree
- Rouse Simmons
- Silviculture
- Tree farm
