= Rhabdocline laricis =

Scientific classification
- Domain: Eukaryota
- Kingdom: Fungi
- Division: Ascomycota
- Class: Leotiomycetes
- Order: Helotiales
- Family: Cenangiaceae
- Genus: Rhabdocline
- Species: R. laricis

Binomial name
- Rhabdocline laricis (Vuill.) J.K. Stone

Species of fungus

Rhabdocline laricis, also known as Meria laricis, is a hyphomycete fungus in the family Cenangiaceae. In larch conifer trees (Larix), it causes the plant disease larch needle cast, also known as meria needle blight. It is generally harmless in older trees. However, it causes browning of needles, which can slow growth, weaken overall resistance to opportunistic pathogens, and can sometimes outright kill seedlings, making Rhabdocline laricis a threat in tree nurseries.

The fungus is sometimes confused with the similar Hypodermella laricis, which causes larch needle blight. Both fungi can infest the same larch for a more virulent effect.

== Taxonomy and nomenclature ==
The species is traditionally known as Meria laricis. Meria was first described by Jean Paul Vuillemin (Vuill.) in France in 1896. DNA analysis in the 1990s indicated its closest ancestor was the Rhabdocline genus, with the similarity significant enough for the genera of Meria, Hartigiella, and Rhabdocline to be combined as synonyms, with Rhabdocline chosen as the name of the merged genus.

== Plant pathology ==
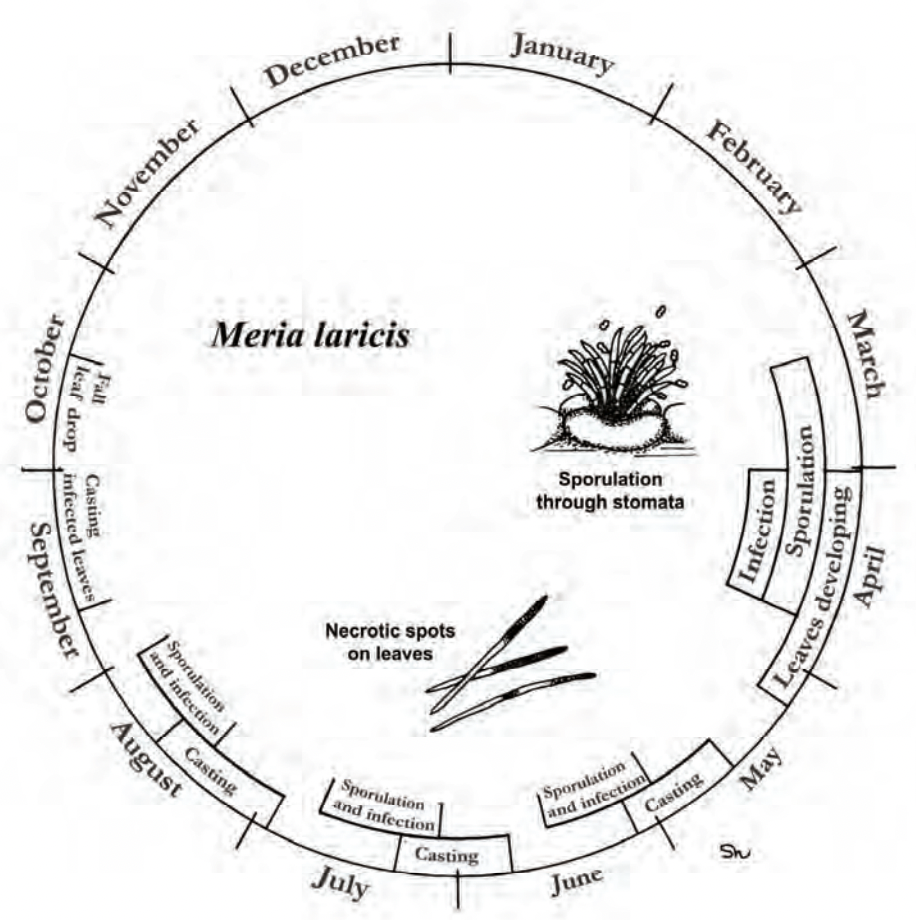
The cycle from infection, to leaf cast, to sporulation and reinfection may take only 2 to 4 weeks, depending on temperature and rainfall.

The needle cast and needle blight affects all species of larch, although it has been speculated that Japanese larches handle it better. It is detected by an appearance of yellow or brown spots on needles during or after wet weather. If moist conditions continue, colorless conidia develop on the lower surface of needles in clusters, and spores begin to grow, appearing as white spots. Browned needles consumed by Rhabdocline laricis eventually wither and drop off the larch.

The fungus is native to Europe, but has since spread elsewhere. Its first reported appearance in North America was in 1942, but probably spread there much earlier.

== Disease cycle ==
Rhabdocline laricis overwinters in the dead terminal tufts of fallen needles that adhere to twigs as well as fallen needles in general. Spores splashed up from these can activate an infection in spring.

Dry weather suppresses Rhabdocline laricis, and moist weather favors it. Experiments suggest that it grows the most at 10–25°C; slight infection can occur from 0–5°C; and none at all over 30 °C.

== Control ==
Rhabdocline laricis is a threat to tree nurseries that are attempting to grow larches such as the Western larch. Even if the infected tree ultimately survives, it may have reduced DBH (diameter) leading to culling by the maintainer for failing to meet the expected size. Fungicide can be used in nurseries, although control in a wider natural forest setting is generally not practical.

Damage from Rhabdocline laricis is not always recognized as such, as the results can be confused with damage from insects or from frost.

== Interaction with Hypodermella laricis ==
The species becomes substantially more problematic when paired with Hypodermella laricis, an ascomycete fungus that lives on Larix, and can produce ill effects more substantial than either plant pathogen alone.
