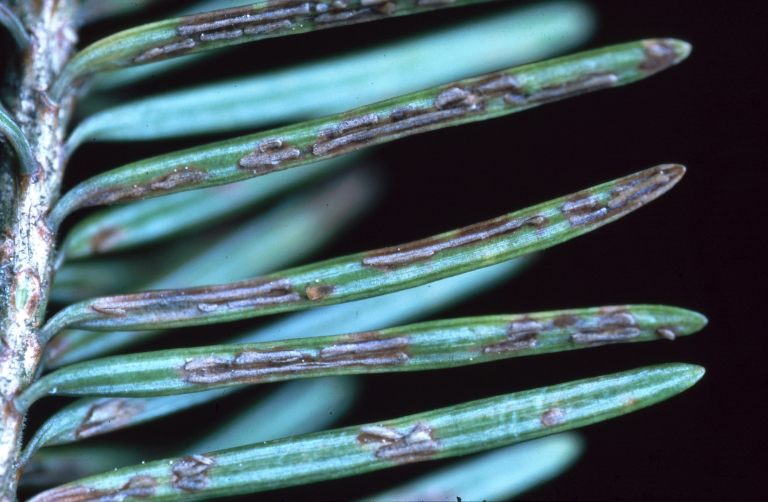

Scientific classification
- Kingdom: Fungi
- Division: Ascomycota
- Class: Leotiomycetes
- Order: Helotiales
- Family: Cenangiaceae
- Genus: Rhabdocline
- Species: R. pseudotsugae

Binomial name
- Rhabdocline pseudotsugae Syd., (1922)

Synonyms
- Rhabdocline pseudotsugae subsp. epiphylla A.K. Parker & J. Reid, (1969); Rhabdocline pseudotsugae subsp. pseudotsugae Syd., (1922)

= Rhabdocline pseudotsugae =

Species of fungus

Rhabdocline pseudotsugae is a fungal plant pathogen. The pathogen, along with Rhabdocline weirii causes Rhabdocline needlecast; R. weirii only affects Douglas-fir trees. The disease causes the needles of the tree to discolor and eventually fall from the tree. It was originally common to the Rocky Mountain states of the United States but has since spread to Europe. Infections usually start in the spring or early summer and can change the color of the foliage to a variety of hues. The fungus produces apothecia that are normally found on the underside of needles but they also occur on the topside as well.

== Range ==
Originally common in the Rocky Mountain States, the fungi spread to the Northeastern United States on ornamental forms of fir trees planted there. It has spread to Europe on trees imported from western North America and it is causing problems with trees growing there also.

== Host and symptoms ==
Rhabdocline pseudotsugae, known as needle cast, is a fungal pathogen that affects Douglas Fir specifically in the Pacific Northwest and Intermountain provinces. Douglas Fir are used as Christmas trees and the aesthetic value can be decreased from R. pseudotsugae. The symptoms first appear as small yellow spots on current season needles in the fall/winter. In the spring the discolored areas on the needle expand and can spread to the whole needle, however bands of discoloration are often formed. The bands start yellow but turn brown/red and can become purple with spots on the upper or lower surface of the needle. Signs of Rhabdocline pseudotsugae include apothecia that mature below epidermis where swelling is visible. These fruiting bodies are present on the underside of needles. In spring a split develops and exposes the orange brown surface of fungal body.

== Infection ==
New infections start in the spring or early summer and conditions that cause prolonged needle wetness promote heavier outbreaks. The first symptoms produced are small yellow spots on the needle ends that develop in late summer or fall. Normally, by the next spring, the needles have started to turn reddish-brown in color produced in mottled or banded patterns. If the infection is severe then needles will turn solid brownish-red and the entire tree will have a "scorched" look to it.

The pathogen, along with Rhabdocline weirii causes Rhabdocline needlecast; R. weirii only affects Douglas-fir trees. The disease causes the needles of the tree to discolor and eventually fall from the tree. The pathogen often makes Douglas-fir trees unsalable as Christmas trees and affects the Christmas tree farming industry.

The fungus Rhabdocline pseudotsugae have apothecia that are normally first produced on the under side of the needles, but it's not uncommon to find them on the top surface too. They are first produced as rounded cushions and as the epidermal layer ruptures, a brown elongated disc is exposed. Needle drop occurs after the ascospores are discharged, normally resulting in only a one-year life span for the fungus.

== Disease cycle ==
Fruiting bodies mature in May/June on one year old needles. In high humidity the mature pseudothecia on the underside of the needles open. The ascospores are windborne and require moisture to germinate. During the release of ascospores a longitudinal split reveal orange spore mass. Infection occurs when buds are opening and expose immature needles. The spores germinate on the immature needle when wet and penetrate the cuticle through an appressoria and haustoria. Once the pseudothecia turns dark brown, usually in June or July, spore production is done for the year. Needles that contain these fruiting bodies are cast from late spring to summer.

== Management ==
The most ideal method of control/management is using resistant varieties. Resistant varieties include Shyswap and Pillar Lake, while Santa Fe, Silver Creek and Coville are only moderately resistant. Cultural control methods such as pruning unhealthy infected shoots and removing severely infected trees are common. It is important not to prune when foliage is wet and to sterilize tools by dipping in denatured alcohol for 3 minutes after shearing infected plantations. Trees should also be sheared in healthy plantations first to avoid contamination of these plantations by workers' clothing and equipment. Douglas-Fir also require full sun and if planted in a shaded area it can encourage needle blight development. Planting trees in dispersed rows, removing lowest canopy and avoiding cover planting reduces air flow which reduces high moisture conditions that promote infection. Chemical control such as fungicides is common, but coverage of all canopy parts is required. Fungicides that can be used include copper hydroxide, copper sulfate, copper salts of fatty and / or rosin acids, mancozeb and thiophanate-methyl. It is also recommended that the trees be sprayed with chlorothalonil at 2 1/2 pounds per 100 gallons of water in hydraulic spray equipment or 5 1/2 pounds per 100 gallons in high-pressure mist blower. The first application should be made as soon as the trees start to break bud. Treatment should be repeated two to three times a week for two to three week intervals.
