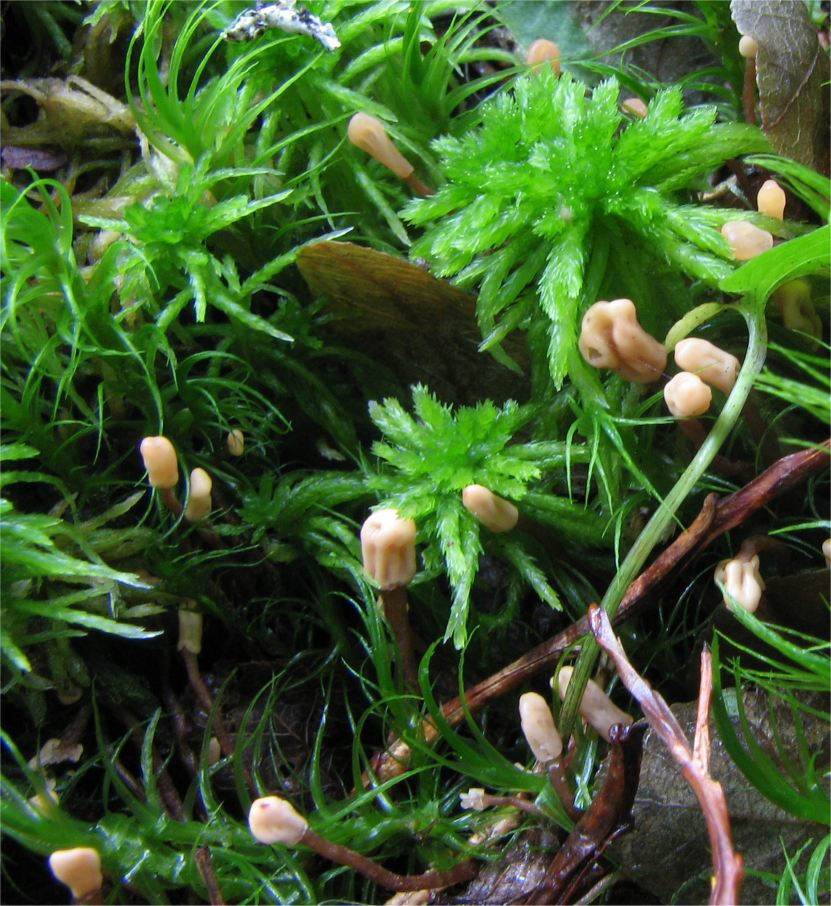
- Heyderia abietis

Scientific classification
- Kingdom: Fungi
- Division: Ascomycota
- Class: Leotiomycetes
- Order: Helotiales
- Family: Hemiphacidiaceae
- Genus: Heyderia (Fr.) Link

Type species
- Heyderia abietis (Fr.) Link

= Heyderia =

Genus of fungi

Heyderia is a genus of fungi in the family Hemiphacidiaceae. The genus contains six species.

The genus name of Heyderia is in honour of Johann Ernst Friedrich Heyder (1765-1797), who was a German doctor and botanist from the 'Universitäts-Chirurgicus' in Göttingen.

The genus was circumscribed by Johann Heinrich Friedrich Link in Tent. Disp. Meth. Fung. (Lipsiae) on page 36 in 1797.

== Species ==
- Heyderia abietis
- Heyderia agariciphila
- Heyderia americana
- Heyderia cucullata
- Heyderia pusilla
- Heyderia sclerotiorum
