= Rhabdocline weirii =

Scientific classification
- Kingdom: Fungi
- Division: Ascomycota
- Class: Leotiomycetes
- Order: Helotiales
- Family: Cenangiaceae
- Genus: Rhabdocline
- Species: R. weirii

Binomial name
- Rhabdocline weirii A.K. Parker & J. Reid, (1969)

Synonyms
- Propolis weirii Traverso & Trotter, (1928); Rhabdocline weirii subsp. oblonga A.K. Parker & J. Reid, (1969); Rhabdocline weirii subsp. obovata A.K. Parker & J. Reid, (1969)

Species of fungus

Rhabdocline weirii is a fungal plant pathogen. The pathogen, along with Rhabdocline pseudotsugae, causes Rhabdocline needlecast; R. weirii only affects Douglas-fir trees. The disease causes the needles of the tree to discolor and eventually fall from the tree. The pathogen often makes Douglas-fir trees unsalable as Christmas trees and affects the Christmas tree farming industry.
