= Sarcotrochila =

Scientific classification
- Kingdom: Fungi
- Division: Ascomycota
- Class: Leotiomycetes
- Order: Helotiales
- Family: Hemiphacidiaceae
- Genus: Sarcotrochila; Höhn.

Type species
- Sarcotrochila alpina (Fuckel) Höhn.

Genus of fungi

Sarcotrochila is a genus of fungi in the family Hemiphacidiaceae. The genus contains four species.
