= Korfia =

Scientific classification
- Kingdom: Fungi
- Division: Ascomycota
- Class: Leotiomycetes
- Order: Helotiales
- Family: Hemiphacidiaceae
- Genus: Korfia; J. Reid & Cain

Type species
- Korfia tsugae (E.K. Cash & R.W. Davidson) J. Reid & Cain

Genus of fungi

Korfia is a genus of fungi in the family Hemiphacidiaceae. This is a monotypic genus, containing the single species Korfia tsugae.

The genus name of Korfia is in honour of Richard Paul "Dick" Korf (1925–2016), who was an American mycologist and founding co-editor of the journal Mycotaxon.

The genus was circumscribed by James Reid and Roy Franklin Cain in Mycologia vol.55 on page 783 in 1963.
