= Fabrella =

Scientific classification
- Kingdom: Fungi
- Division: Ascomycota
- Class: Leotiomycetes
- Order: Helotiales
- Family: Hemiphacidiaceae
- Genus: Fabrella; Kirschst.

Type species
- Fabrella tsugae (Farl.) Kirschst.

Genus of fungi

Fabrella is a genus of fungi in the family Hemiphacidiaceae. This is a monotypic genus, containing the single species Fabrella tsugae.
