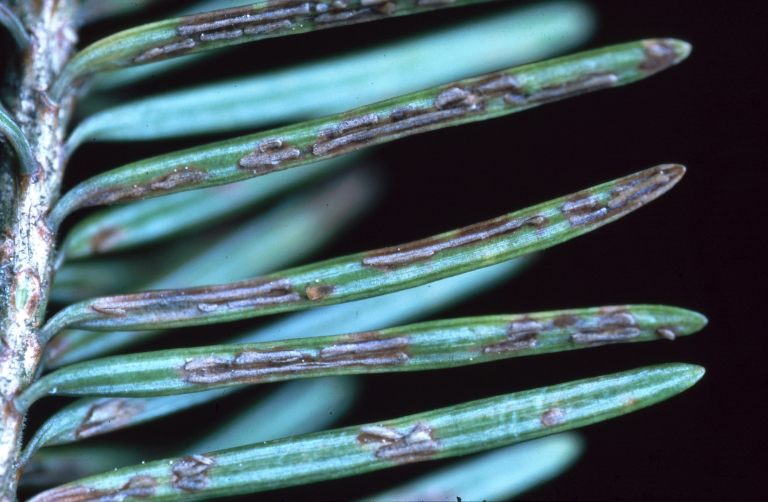

Scientific classification
- Kingdom: Fungi
- Division: Ascomycota
- Class: Leotiomycetes
- Order: Helotiales
- Family: Cenangiaceae
- Genus: Rhabdocline; Syd.

Type species
- Rhabdocline pseudotsugae Syd.

= Rhabdocline =

Genus of fungi

Rhabdocline is a genus of fungi in the family Hemiphacidiaceae.

In 2010, the genus contained 3 species. Meria and Rhabdogloeum are anamorphs.

== Species ==
- Rhabdocline laricis
- Rhabdocline pseudotsugae
- Rhabdocline weirii
