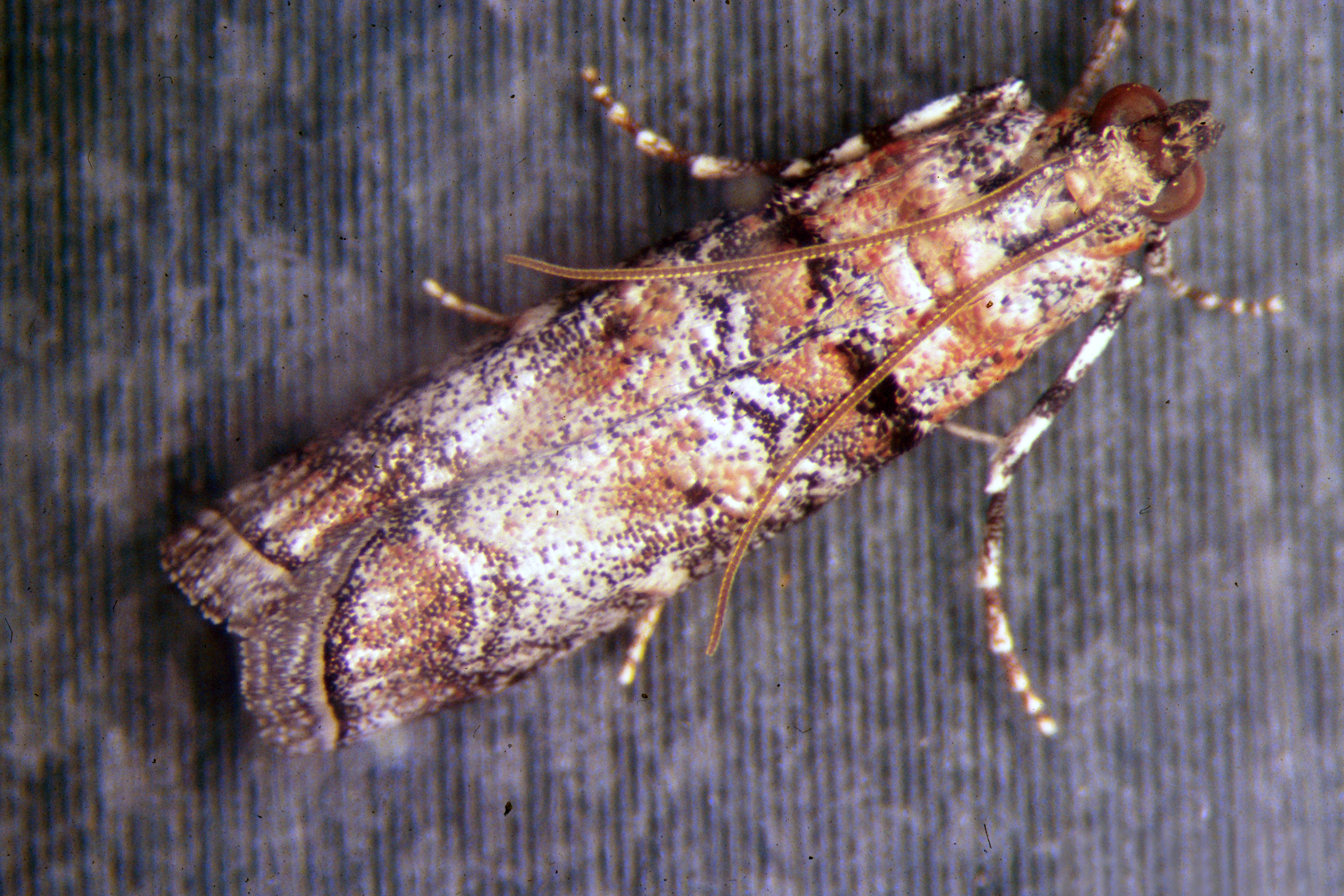

Scientific classification
- Kingdom: Animalia
- Phylum: Arthropoda
- Class: Insecta
- Order: Lepidoptera
- Family: Pyralidae
- Genus: Dioryctria
- Species: D. zimmermani

Binomial name
- Dioryctria zimmermani (Grote, 1877)

Synonyms
- Nephopteryx zimmermani Grote, 1877; Retinia austriana Cosens, 1906

= Dioryctria zimmermani =

Zimmerman pine moth

Species of moth

Dioryctria zimmermani, the Zimmerman pine moth, is a moth of the family Pyralidae. It is found from southern Canada and the north-eastern and Great Lakes areas of the United States. There is a disjunct population in eastern Nebraska.

The wingspan is about 37 mm. The forewings are mottled gray and red/brown with zigzag light and dark markings. The hindwings are yellowish white. There is one generation per year.

The larvae feed on various Pinus species, but prefer Austrian and Scotch pine. It is considered a serious pest of pine species in the mid-west of the United States. Full-grown larvae are 18–25 mm long.

== Gallery ==
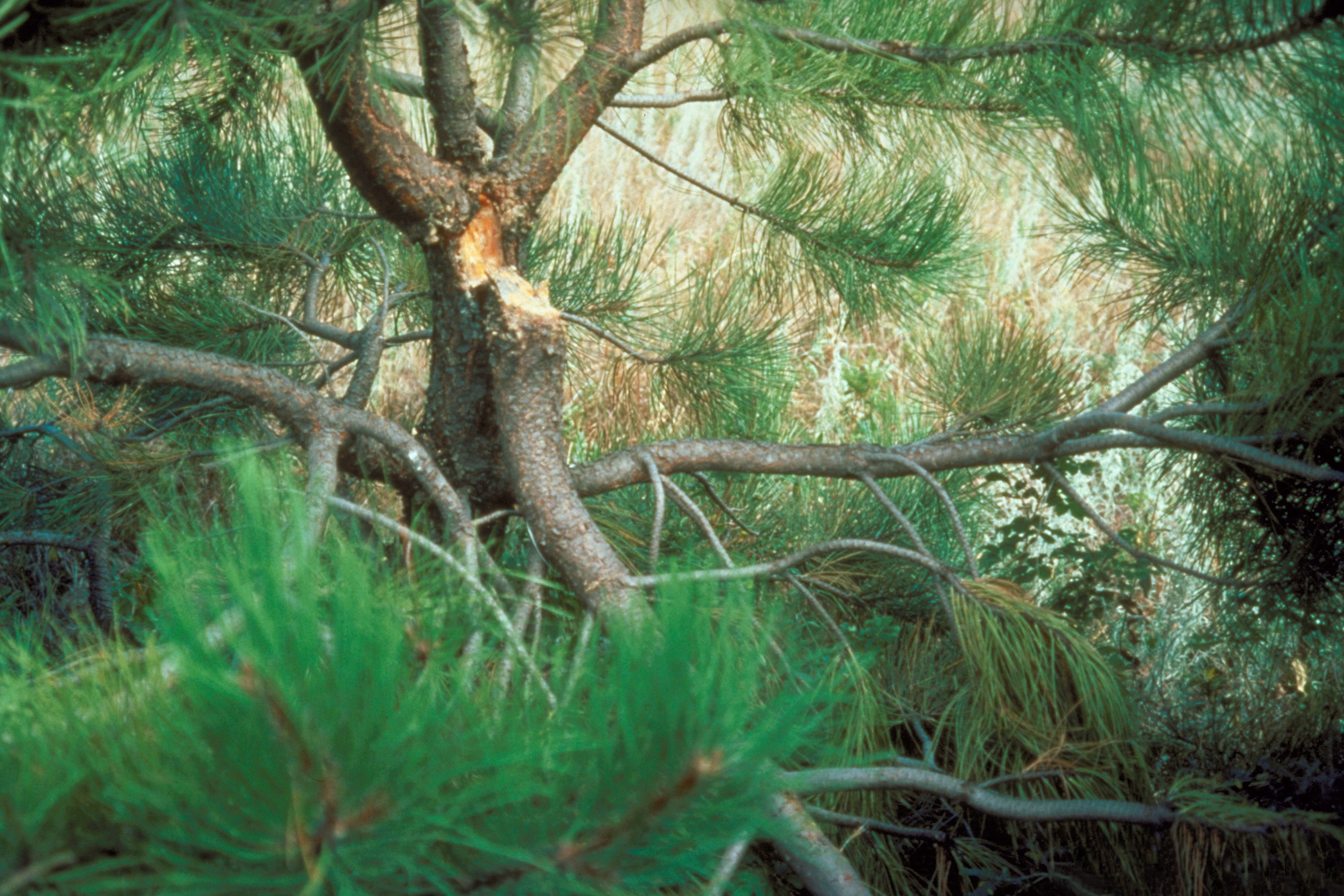
Damage

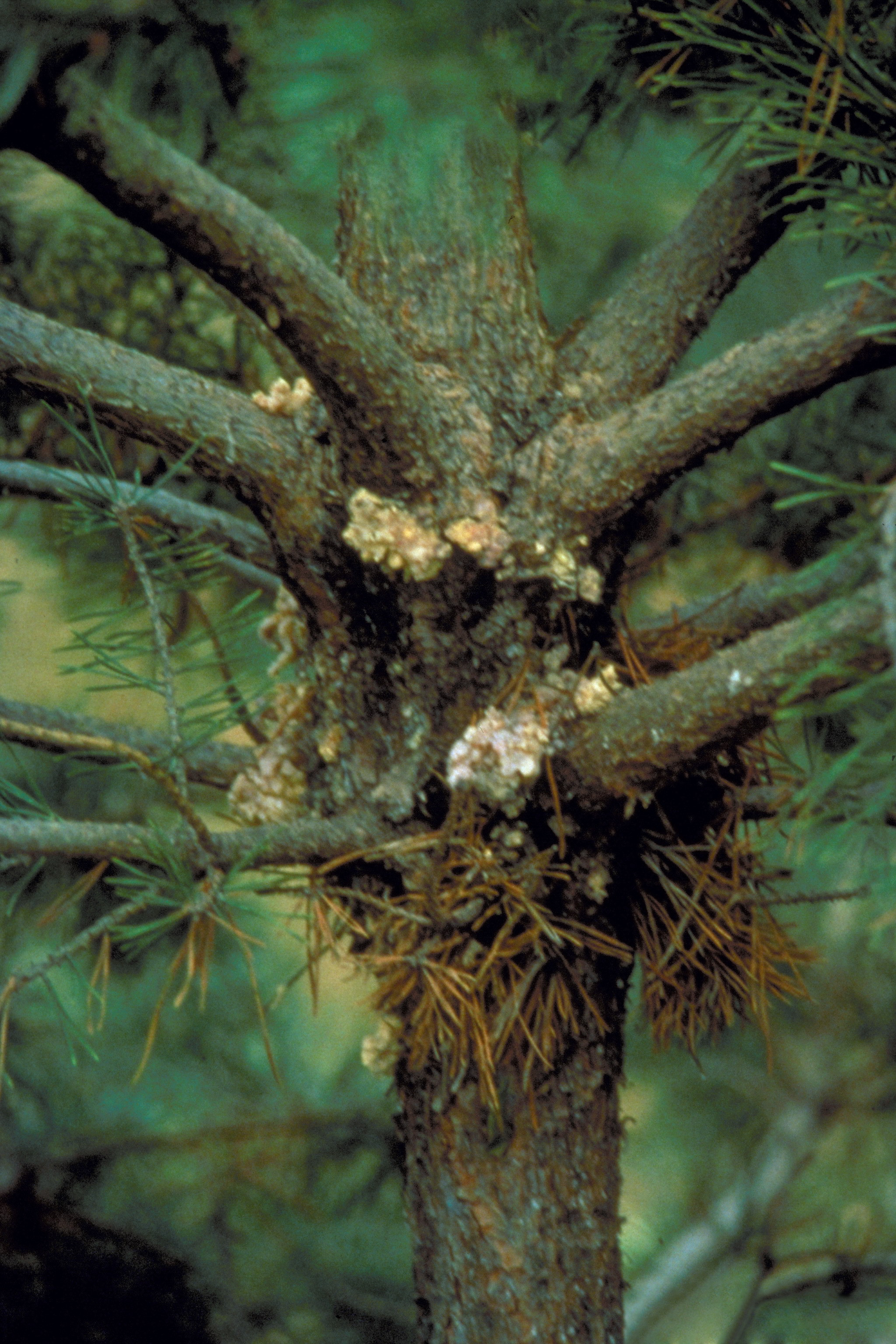
Damage

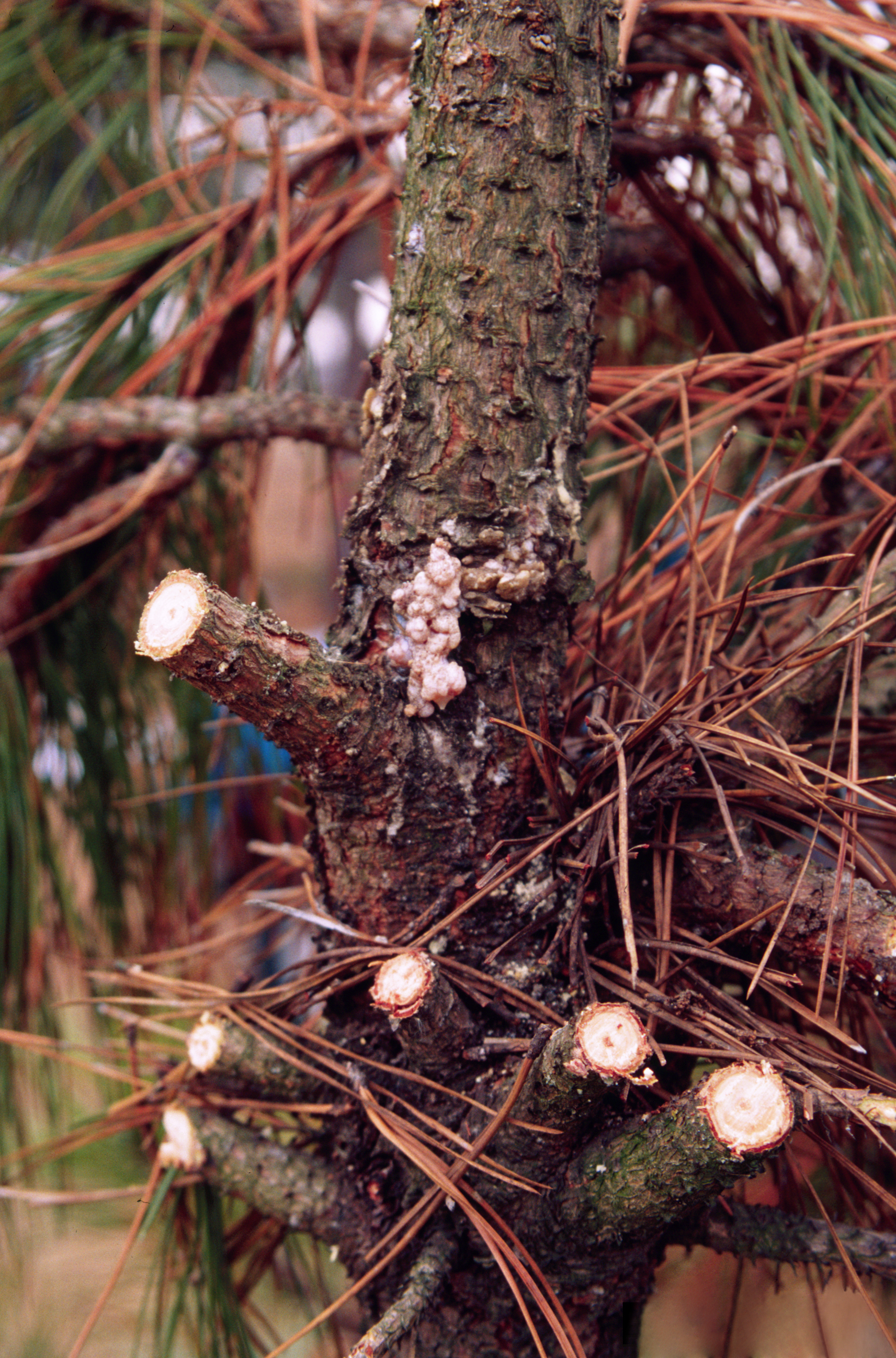
Damage

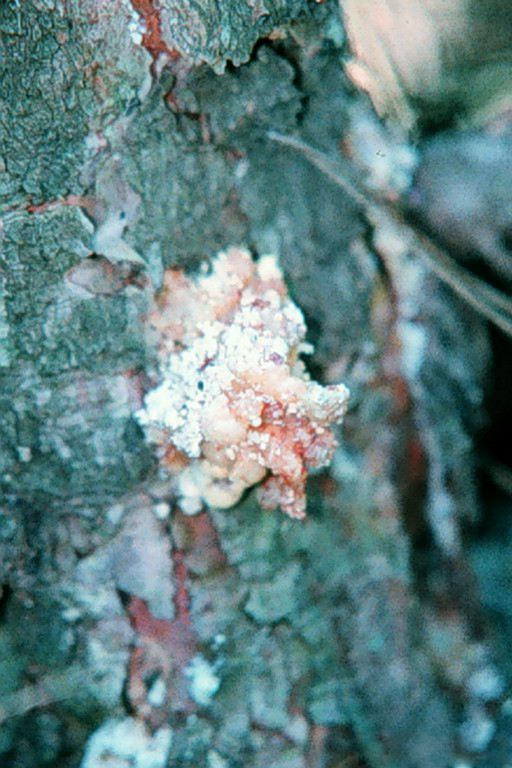
Damage

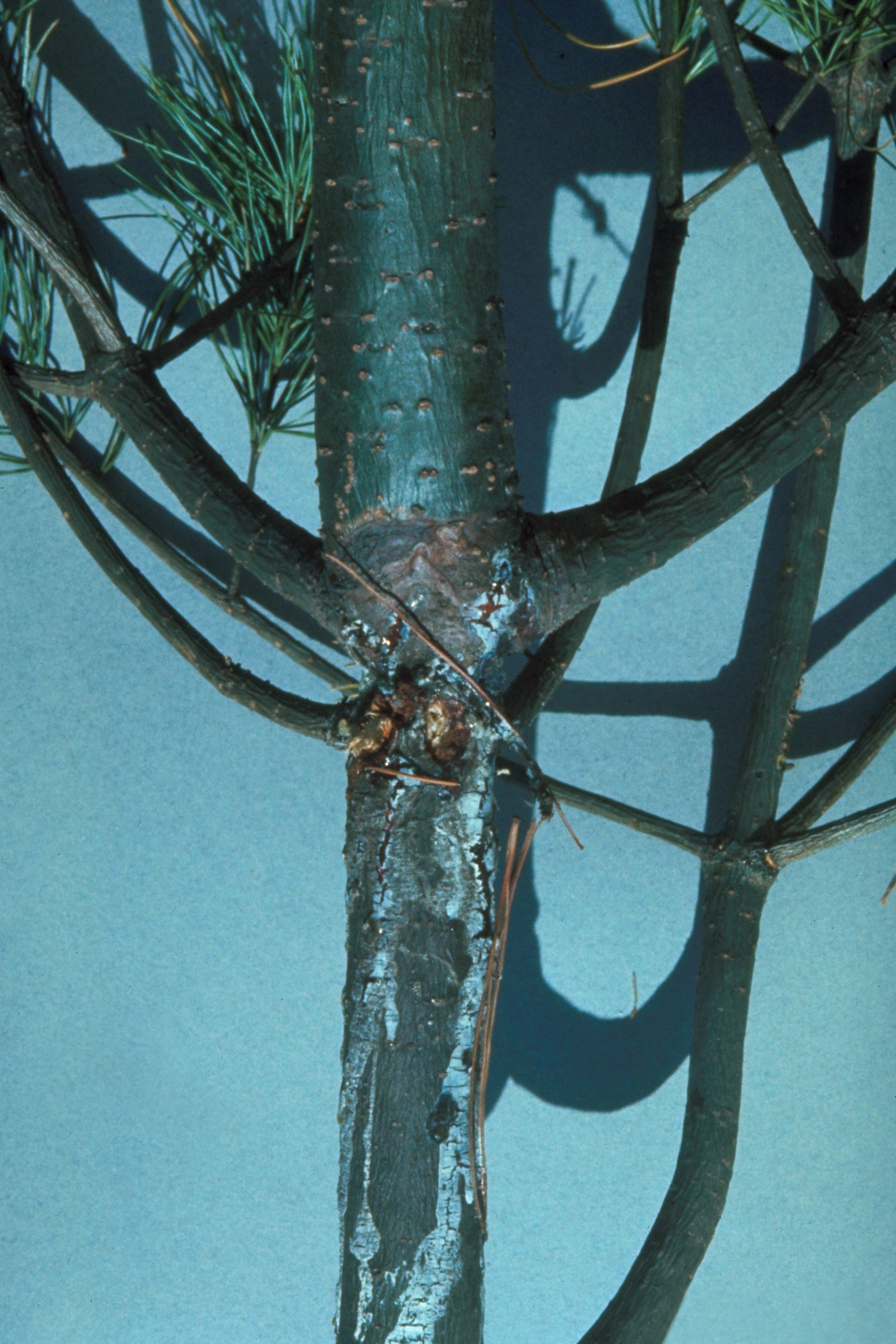
Damage

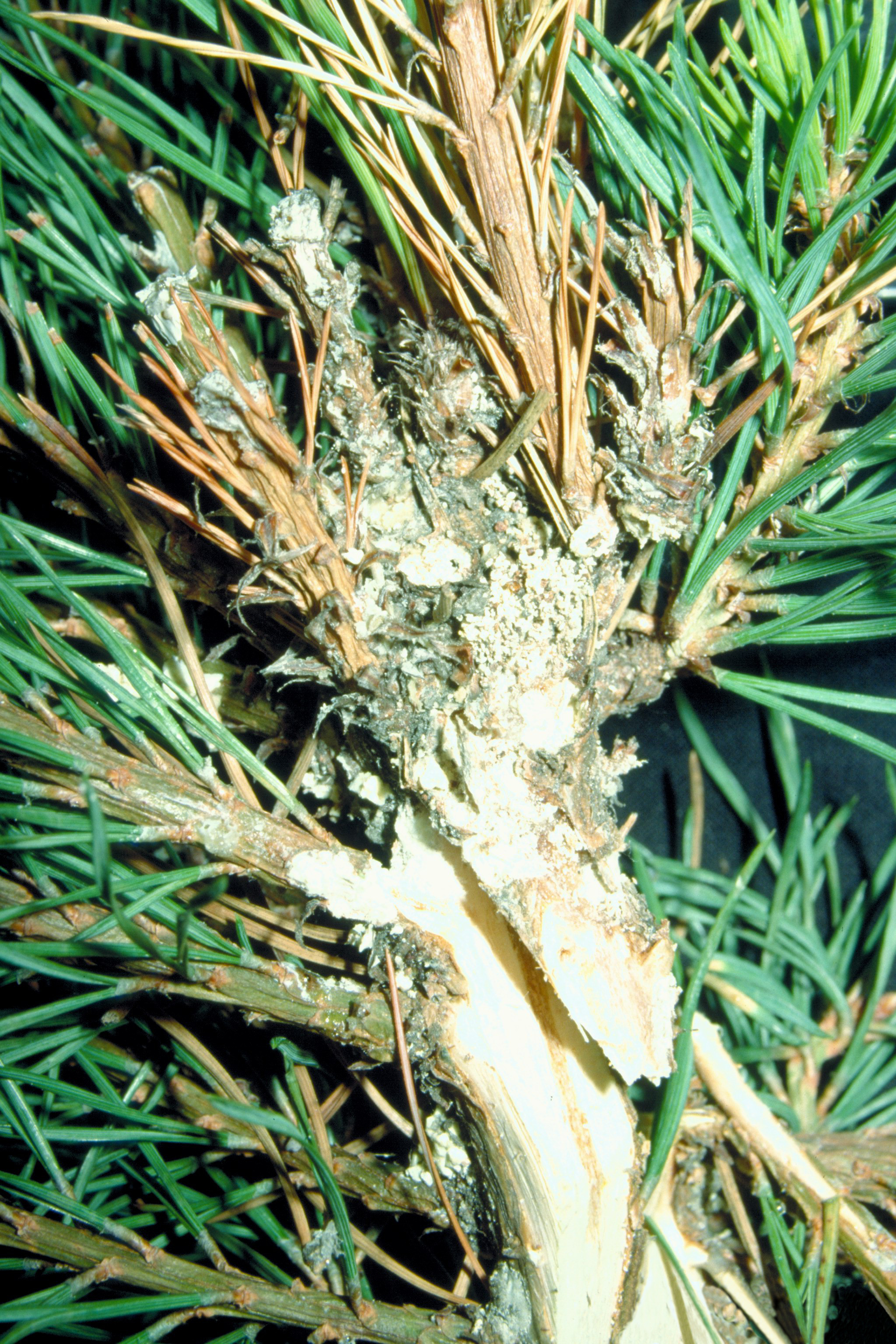
Damage

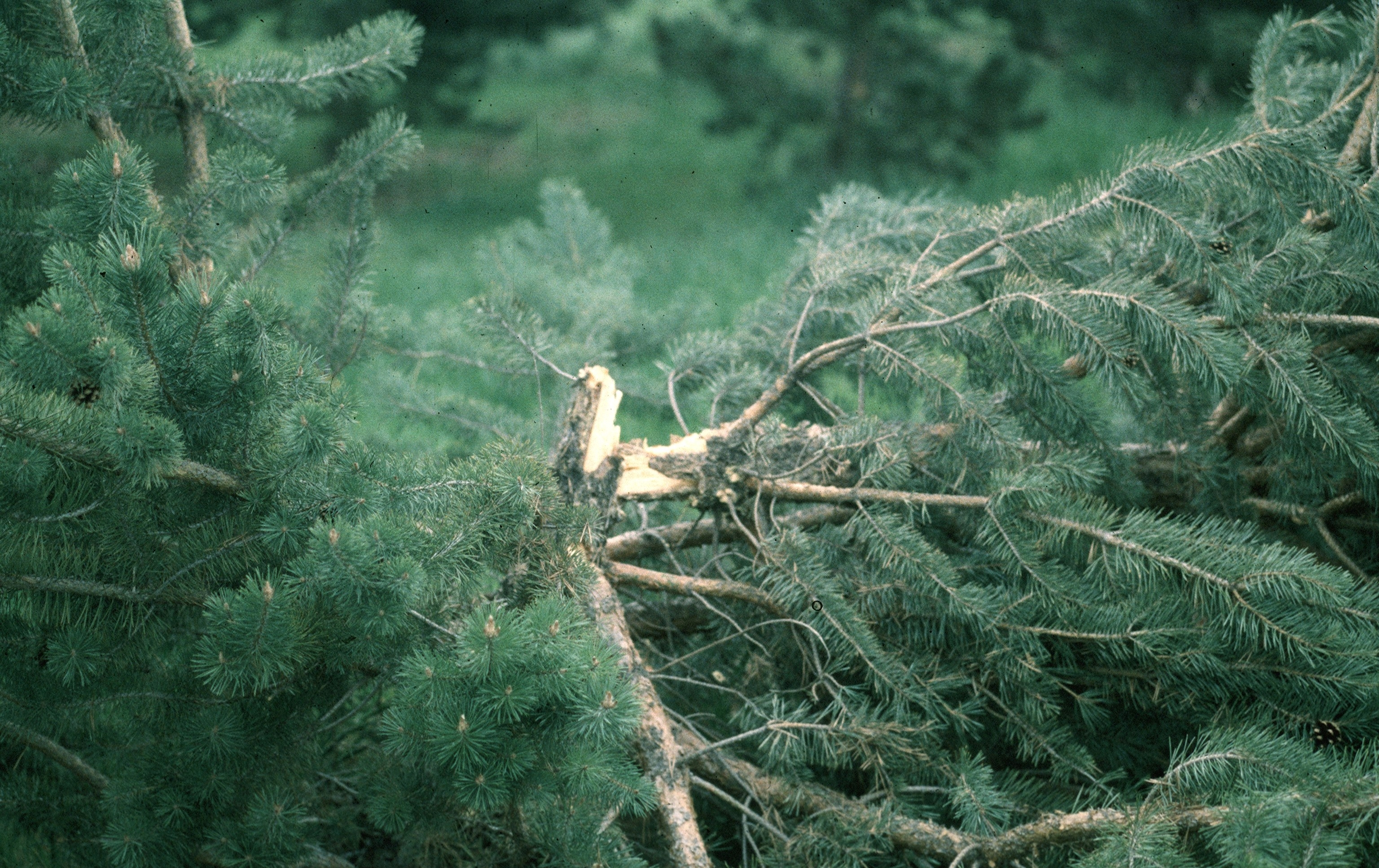
Damage

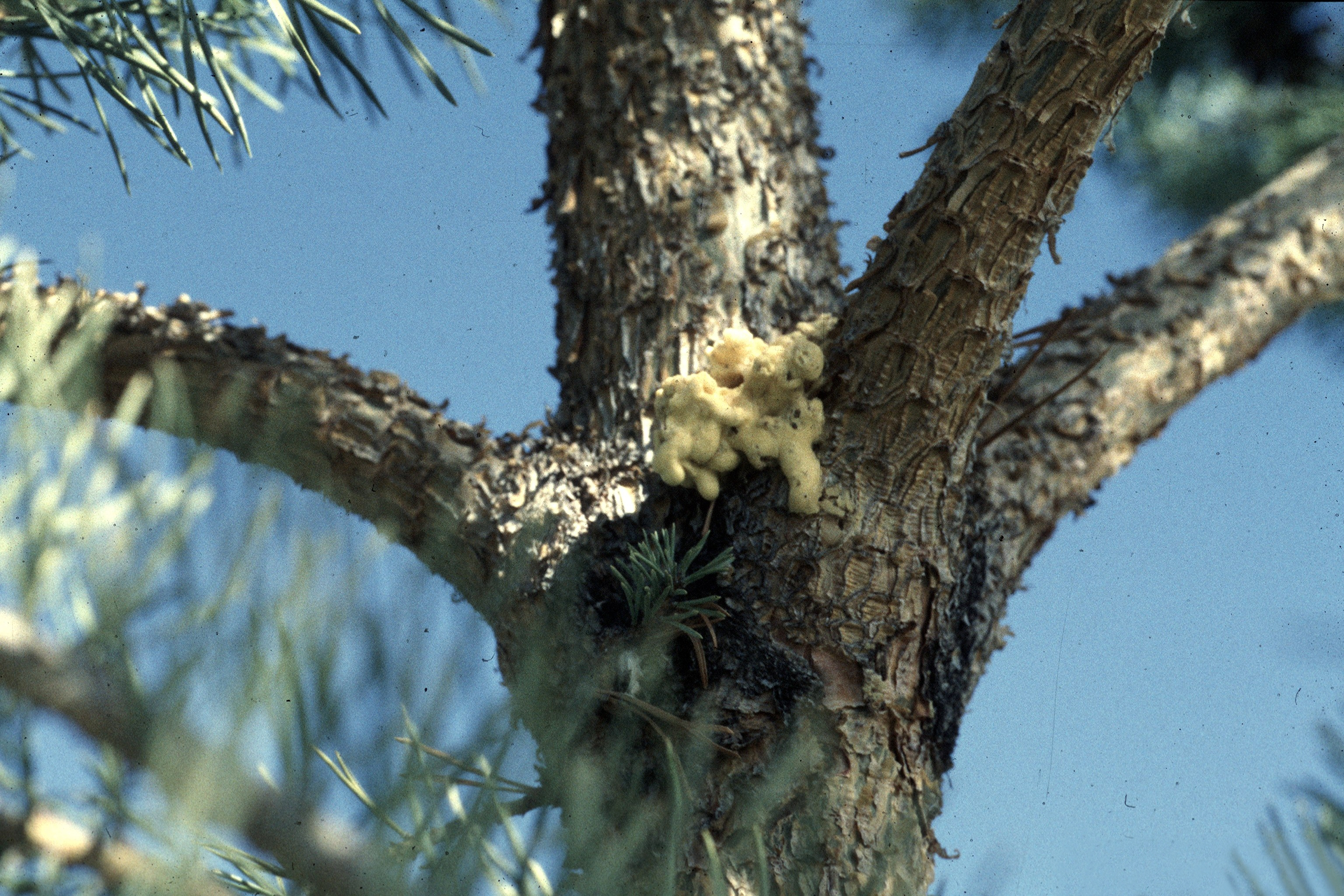
Damage
