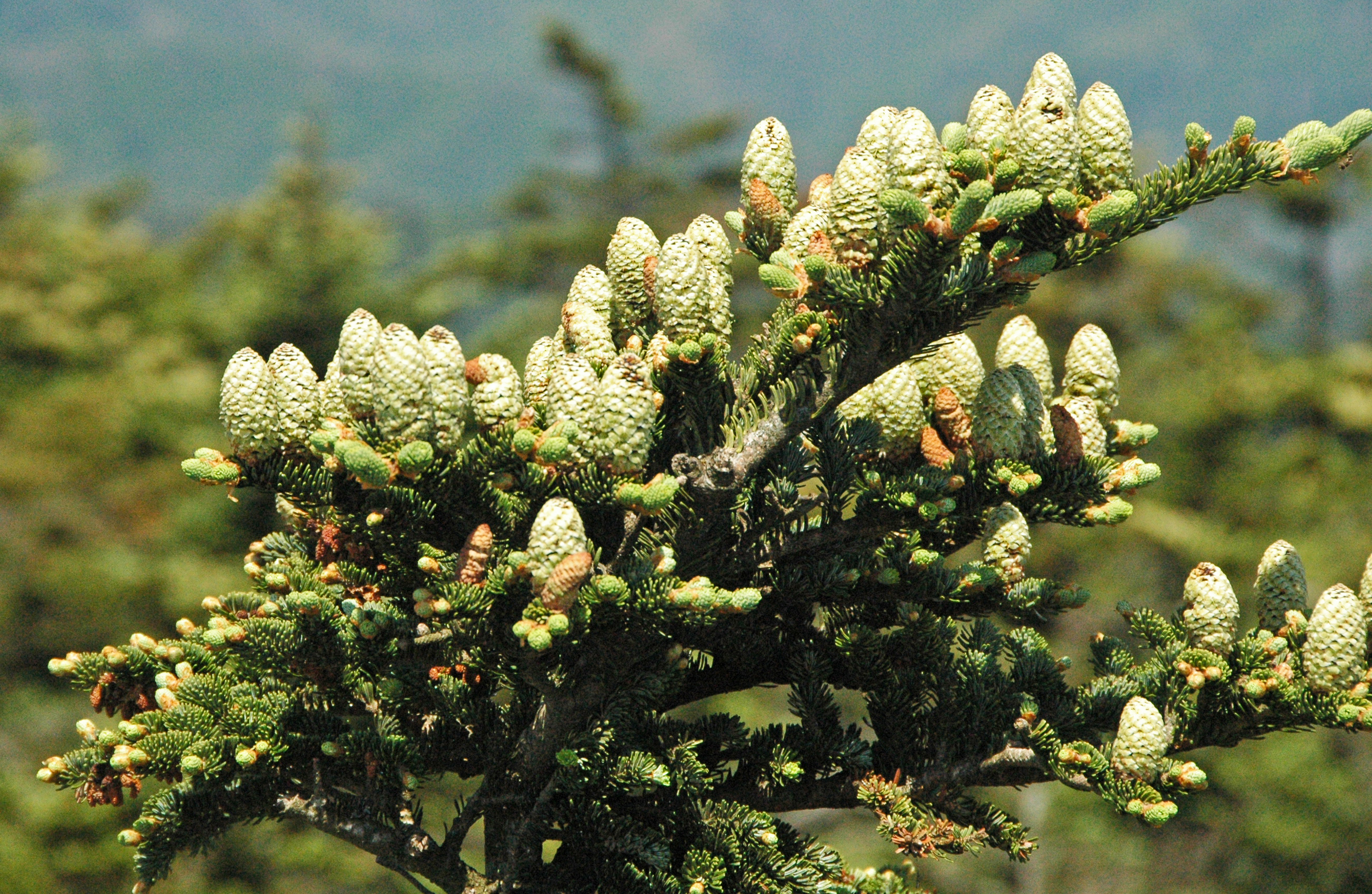
- Foliage and cones, Kuwohi, North Carolina

Conservation status
- Endangered (IUCN 3.1)

- Imperiled (NatureServe)

Scientific classification
- Kingdom: Plantae
- Clade: Tracheophytes
- Clade: Gymnosperms
- Division: Pinophyta
- Class: Pinopsida
- Order: Pinales
- Family: Pinaceae
- Genus: Abies
- Section: Abies sect. Balsamea
- Species: A. fraseri

Binomial name
- Abies fraseri (Pursh) Poir.
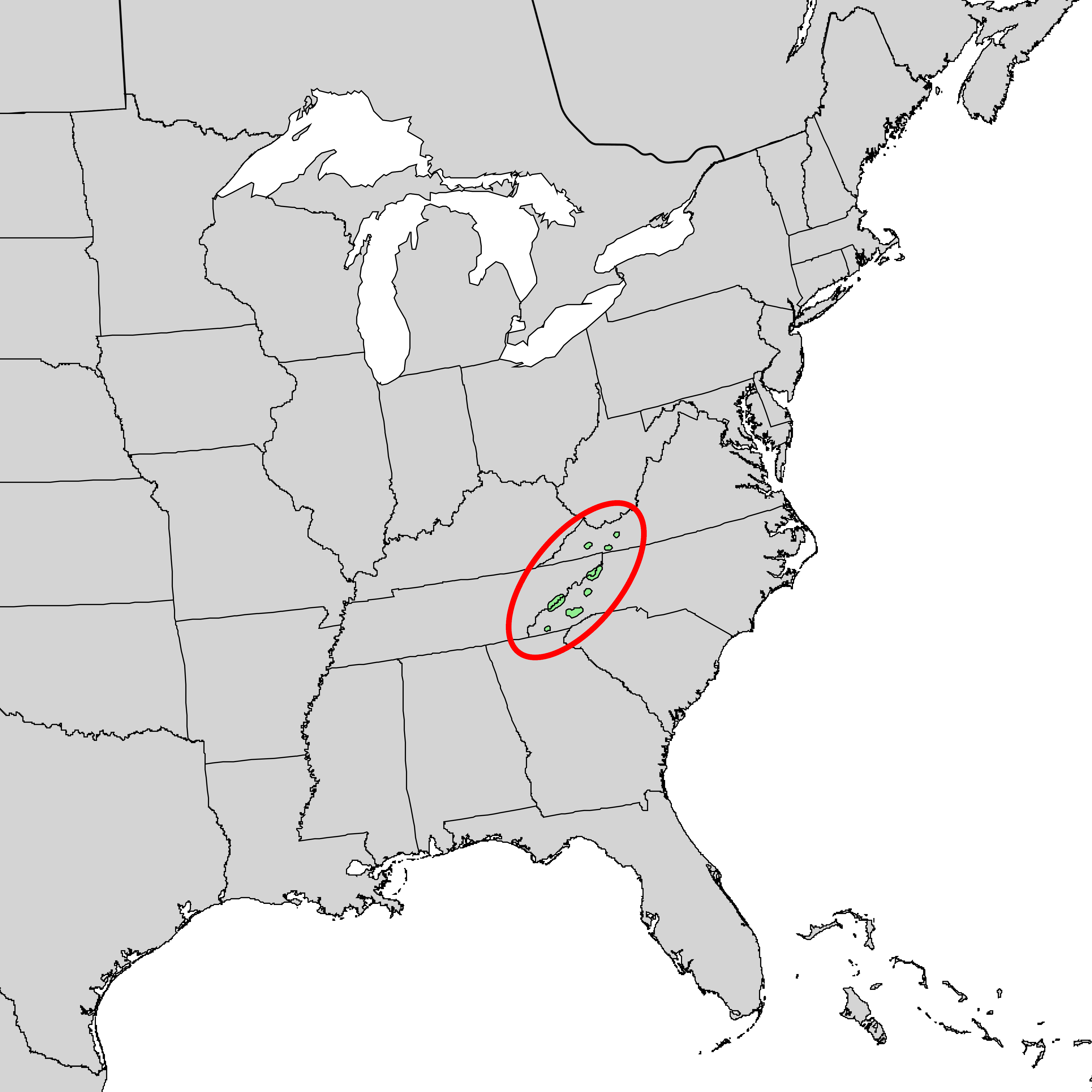
- Natural range of Abies fraseri
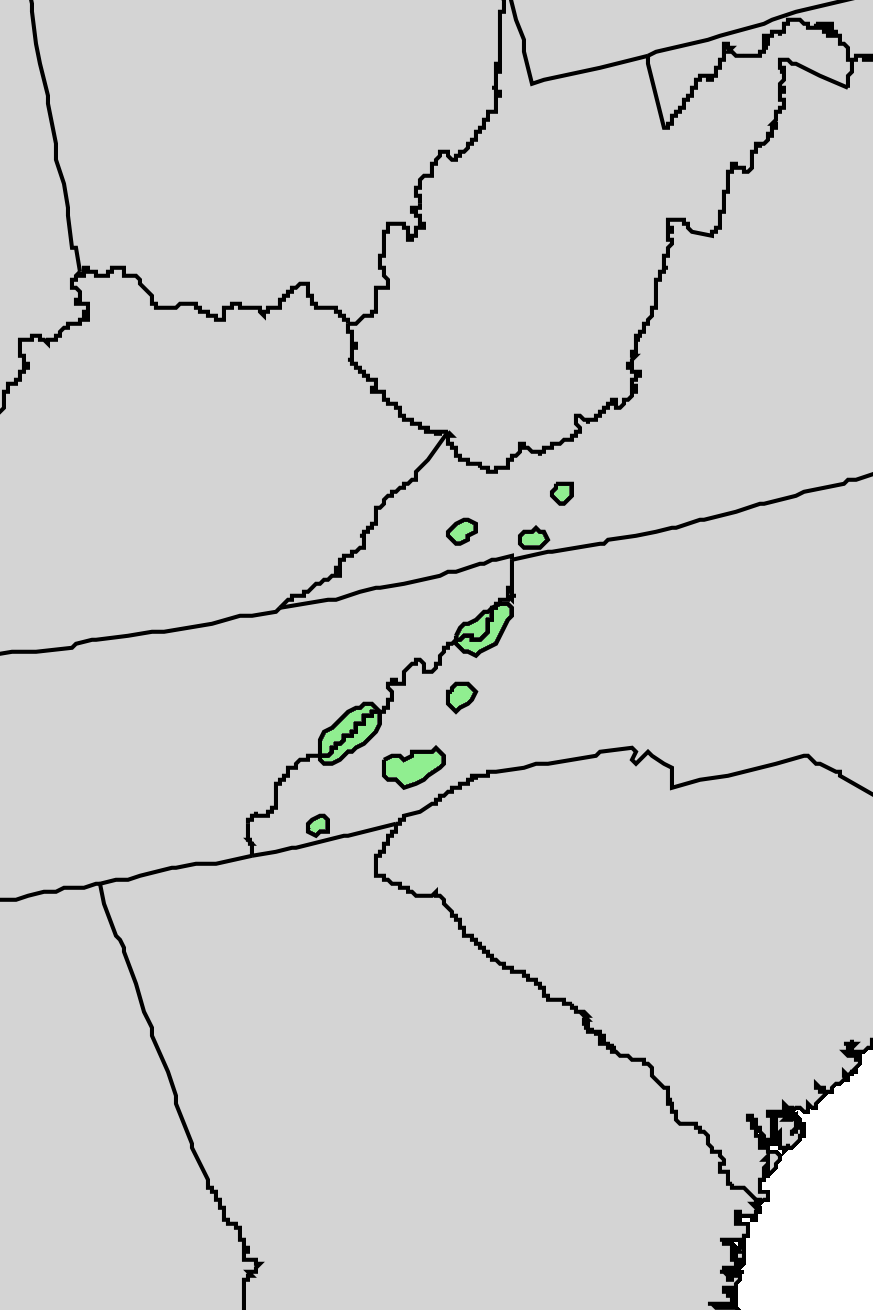
- Close-up of natural range of Abies fraseri

Synonyms
- Abies balsamea subsp. fraseri (Pursh) E.Murray; Abies balsamea var. fraseri (Pursh) Spach; Abies humilis Bach.Pyl.; Picea fraseri (Pursh) Loudon; Picea hudsonia Gordon; Pinus fraseri Pursh

= Fraser fir =

Species of conifer

Abies fraseri, commonly known as Fraser's fir, or Fraser fir, is an endangered species of fir in the order Pinales native to the Appalachian Mountains of the southeastern United States. It is endemic to the Appalachian Mountains, where it grows in 48 populations on seven montane regions in the range. The tree grows between 10 and 15 m (30 and 50ft), sometimes even up to 25 m (80ft). Fraser fir trees have dark green needle-like leaves that spiral on their twigs and produce cylindrical cones that disintegrate when mature. The tree grows in areas that experience a cool and moist climate as well as frequent cloud coverage. There are many ecological factors that pose a threat to the species including the balsam woolly adelgid, a pest that eliminated over 80 percent of mature trees, as well as climate change. The tree is also cultivated for commercial use and is widely used as Christmas trees.

== Taxonomy ==
Abies fraseri is closely related to Abies balsamea (balsam fir), of which it has occasionally been treated as a subspecies (as A. balsamea subsp. fraseri (Pursh) E.Murray) or a variety (as A. balsamea var. fraseri (Pursh) Spach). Some botanists regard the variety of balsam fir named Abies balsamea var. phanerolepis as a natural hybrid with Abies fraseri, denominated Abies × phanerolepis (Fernald) Liu.

== Names ==
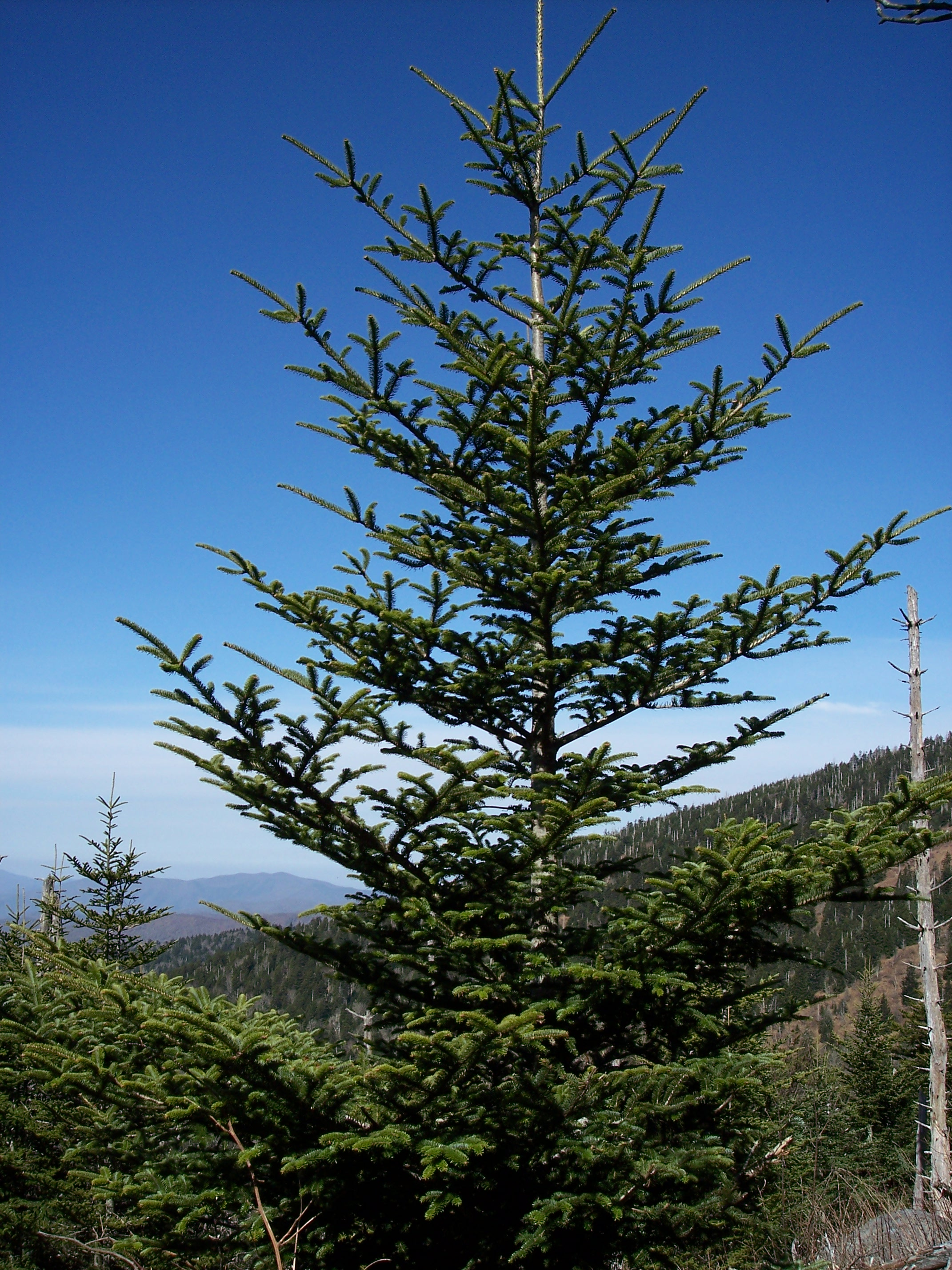
Fraser's fir on the slopes of Kuwohi

The species Abies fraseri is named after the Scottish botanist John Fraser (1750–1811), who made numerous botanical collections in the region. His name is sometimes misspelled "Frasier", "Frazer" or "Frazier".

In the past, it was also sometimes known as "she-balsam" because resin could be "milked" from its bark blisters, in contrast to the "he balsam" (or Picea rubens, the red spruce) which could not be milked. It has also been called southern balsam fir, inviting confusion with A. balsamea.

== Description ==
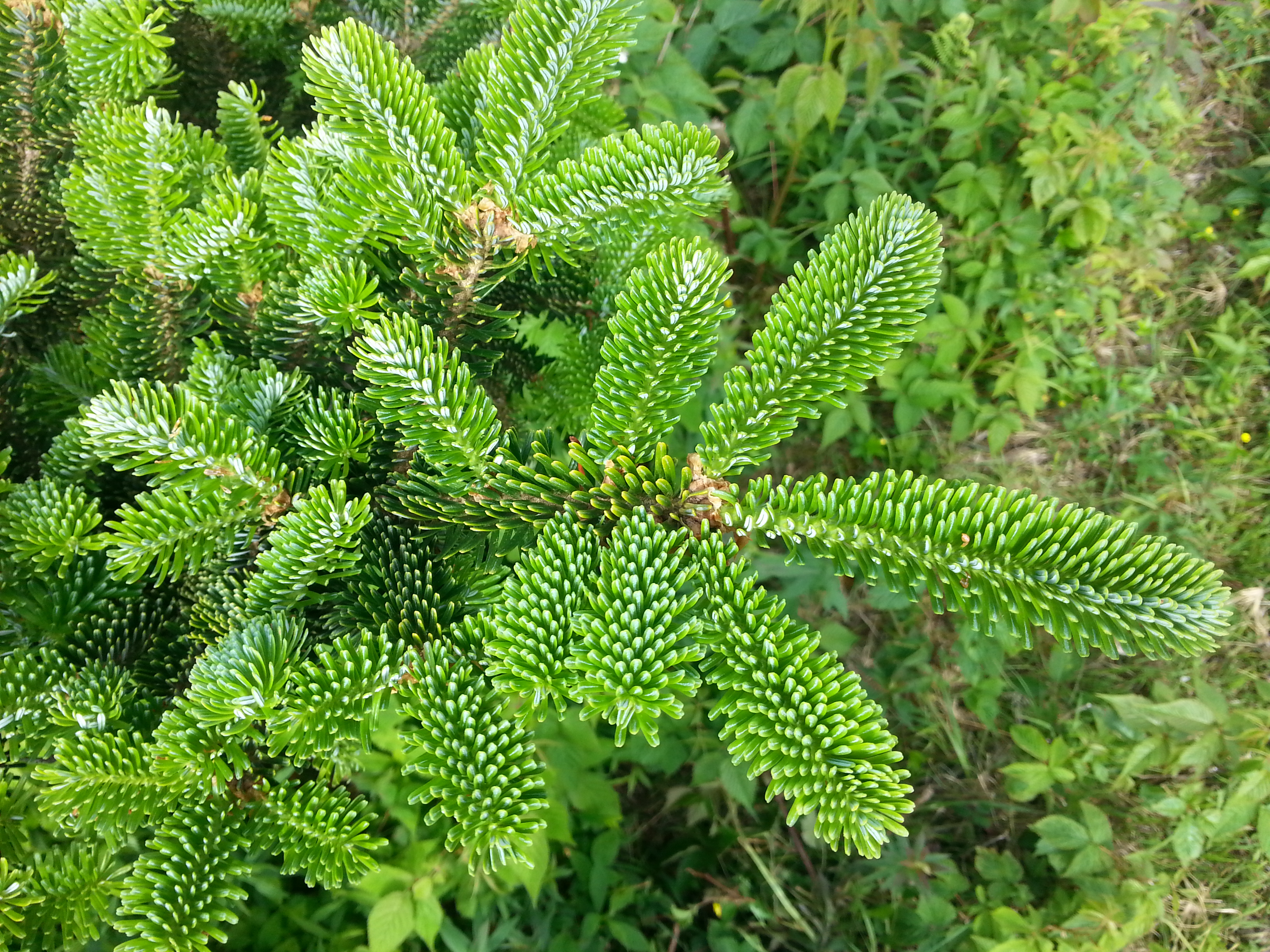
Close-up view of the foliage

Abies fraseri is a small evergreen coniferous tree typically growing to 10 and 15 m (30 and 50 ft) tall, rarely to 25 m (80 ft), with a trunk diameter of 50–75 cm (20–30 in). The crown is conical, with straight branches either horizontal to angled upward at up to 40° from the trunk; it is dense when the tree is young and more open in maturity. The bark is thin, smooth, grayish brown, and has numerous resinous blisters on juvenile trees, becoming fissured and scaly in maturity.

The leaves are needle-like; arranged spirally on the twigs but somewhat twisted at their bases to form two rows spreading either side of the twig, with some above the twig but few or none below the twig. They are 10–23 mm (0.39–0.91 in) long and 2–2.2 mm (0.079–0.087 in) broad, flat, flexible, and rounded or slightly notched at their apices (tips). They are dark to glaucous green adaxially (above), often with a small patch of stomata near their apices; and with two silvery white stomatal bands abaxially (on their undersides). Their strong fragrance resembles that of turpentine.

The cones are erect, cylindrical, 3.5–7 cm (1.4–2.8 in) long, rarely 8 cm (3.1 in), and 2.5–3 cm (0.98–1.18 in) broad, rarely 4 cm (1.6 in) broad, dark purple, turning pale brown when mature, often resinous, and with long reflexed green, yellow, or pale purple bract scales. The cones disintegrate when mature at 4–6 months old to release the winged seeds.

== Ecology ==
=== Reproduction and growth ===
Fraser's fir is monoecious, with both male and female cones on the same tree. The cone buds usually open from mid May to early June. Female cones are borne mostly near the top of the crown and on the distal ends of branches. The male cones are borne below female cones, but mostly in the upper half of the crown. Seed production may begin when trees are 15 years old. Seeds germinate well on mineral soil, moss, peat, decaying stumps and logs, and even on detritus or litter that is sufficiently moist.

=== Distribution and habitat ===
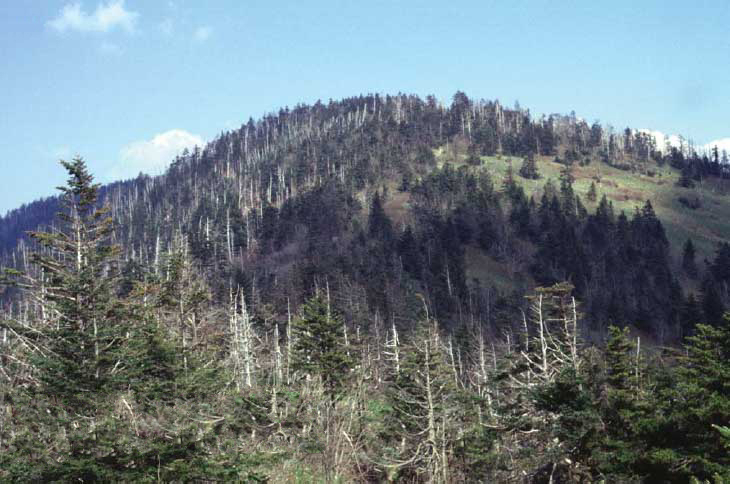
Fraser's fir forest, with many trees killed by balsam woolly adelgid

Abies fraseri is restricted to the southeastern Appalachian Mountains in southwestern Virginia, western North Carolina and eastern Tennessee, where it occurs at high elevations, from 1,200 m (3,900 ft) to the top of the highest summit in the area, Mount Mitchell, at 2,037 m (6,683 ft). It grows in acidic moist but well-drained sandy loam and is usually mixed with Picea rubens (red spruce). Other trees it grows with include Tsuga caroliniana (Carolina hemlock), Betula alleghaniensis (yellow birch), Betula papyrifera (paper birch), and Acer saccharum (sugar maple). The climate is cool and moist, with short, cool summers and cold winters with heavy snowfall. It lives in sites that experience frequent cloud coverage, which, when paired with cooler temperatures, improves plant water status and high soil moisture.

== Threats ==
=== Pests ===
Abies fraseri can be severely damaged by a non-native insect, the balsam woolly adelgid (Adelges piceae) from Europe. The insect's introduction and spread led to a rapid decline in the species across its range, with over 80 percent of mature trees having been killed. The rapid regeneration of seedlings with lack of canopy has led to good regrowth of healthy young trees where the mature forests once stood. These young trees are now old enough for the bark to develop fissures, but despite this, there has been no resurgence by the adelgids.

For this reason, the future of the species was still uncertain, though the Mount Rogers (Virginia) population has largely evaded adelgid mortality. The decline in the southern Appalachians has contributed to loss of moss habitat which supports the endangered spruce-fir moss spider (Microhexura montivaga), an obligate of the Southern Appalachian spruce–fir forest ecoregion.

By the late 1990s, the adelgid population had decreased. While two-thirds of adult trees had been killed by the 1980s, a study of the Great Smoky Mountains National Park showed that as of 2020, the number of adult trees had increased over the previous 30 years, with three times as many on Kuwohi, Tennessee's highest peak.

The elongate hemlock scale, Fiorinia externa, is another invasive pest that Fraser firs are susceptible to. F. Externa is native to Eastern Asia, but it is invasive in the US. This pest primarily attacks eastern hemlock trees and causes yellowing, needle-dropping, and in rare cases mortality; however, it has been found in cut Fraser firs as well. A 2025 study showed that the pest is able to survive in cold temperatures. Recent winter temperatures in the US are insufficient to prevent the pest from spreading to other hosts which poses a risk for Fraser firs.

=== Climate change ===
As global temperatures continue to warm, Abies fraseri is impacted in different ways depending on their elevation. Farms at lower elevations may experience less rainfall due to increasing temperatures that push cloud ceilings higher up. This would reduce growth in trees located at this elevation. However, trees at a higher elevation that usually are limited by colder temperatures may experience more growth from the warming temperatures.

== Cultivation and uses ==
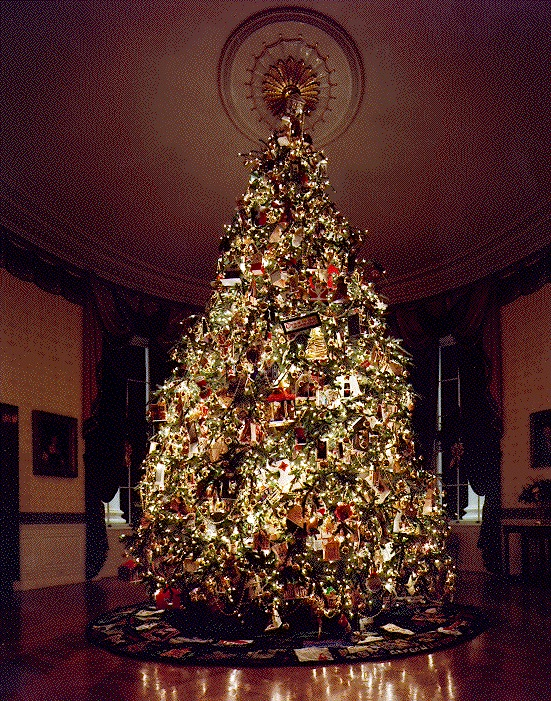
A Fraser's fir as the 1995 White House Christmas tree

Although not important as a source of timber, the combination of dense natural pyramidal form, strong limbs, soft long-retained needles, dark blue-green color, pleasant scent and excellent shipping characteristics, has led to Fraser's fir being widely used as a Christmas tree. Fraser's fir has been used more times as the White House Christmas tree than any other tree.

The Christmas decoration trade is a multimillion-dollar business in the southern Appalachians. North Carolina produces the majority of Fraser's fir Christmas trees. It requires from seven to ten years in the field to produce a 6–7-foot-tall (1.8–2.1-meter) tree. In 2005, the North Carolina General Assembly passed legislation making the Fraser's fir the official Christmas tree of North Carolina.

Fraser's fir is cultivated from seedlings in several northern states and in Quebec, especially for the Christmas tree trade. It is also grown in Bedgebury National Pinetum and other collections in the United Kingdom.

== See also ==
- Appalachian temperate rainforest
