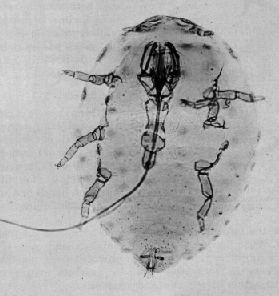
- Adult balsam woolly adelgid

Scientific classification
- Kingdom: Animalia
- Phylum: Arthropoda
- Clade: Pancrustacea
- Class: Insecta
- Order: Hemiptera
- Suborder: Sternorrhyncha
- Family: Adelgidae
- Genus: Adelges
- Species: A. piceae

Binomial name
- Adelges piceae (Ratzeburg, 1844)

= Balsam woolly adelgid =

Insect that attacks fir trees

The balsam woolly adelgid (Adelges piceae) is a small wingless insect that infests and kills firs. In their native Europe they are a minor parasite of silver fir and Sicilian fir, but they have become a threat especially to balsam fir and Fraser fir after they were introduced to the United States around the beginning of the 20th century. Because this species is not native to North America, the Fraser fir has not evolved any type of defense against it.

== Reproduction ==
These insects typically lay about one hundred eggs and have three generations per year. The adelgid attacks the tree by feeding in fissures within the bark of trees larger than about four centimeters in diameter at breast height. As it feeds, it releases toxins contained within its saliva. These toxins reduce the conductance of sapwood being built, which causes water stress and kills the trees.

== Impact ==
The Great Smoky Mountains National Park, straddling North Carolina and Tennessee in the Southeastern United States, contains about 75% of all southern spruce-fir ecosystems. These ecosystems covered vast portions of the Southeast during the Last Glacial Period, when the climate was cool and moist. Since the retreat of the glaciers, this ecosystem has been confined to the higher elevations in the mountains of the Southeast. The spruce-fir forest has evolved as an ecological island, away from any other ecosystems of its type. This has presented valuable research and a unique habitat. These forests have a very dense canopy and a moist understory.

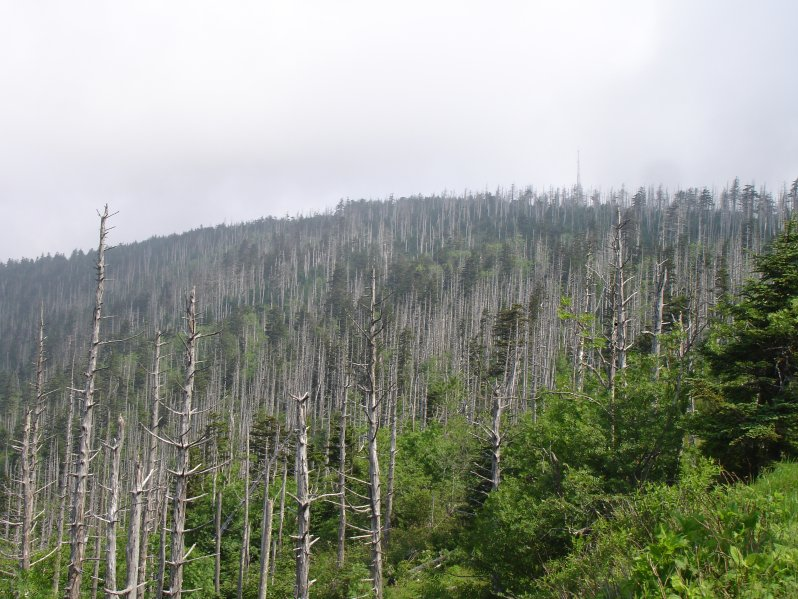
"Ghost" Fraser firs killed by the balsam woolly adelgid on Kuwohi, Great Smoky Mountain National Park

Although some areas are being regenerated by young firs, there is much change in understory composition, including invasion by both woody and herbaceous species. Red spruce, the spruce component of the spruce fir ecosystem, has also been suffering declines.The spruce-fir moss spider, which lives on moss mats below the forest canopy, is considered endangered because of the decline of the Fraser fir.

Although the fir population in the Great Smoky Mountains National Park was decimated by woolly adelgids in the 1960s through 1980s, there has been some recovery since then. The number of adult firs has increased over 30 years, with Kuwohi having three times as many adult trees as of 2020 as in the 1980s.

The balsam woolly adelgid also has a significant impact on Pacific Northwest forests. Specifically, grand fir, silver fir and subalpine fir in Washington and Oregon can serve as hosts. Extensive mortality by this pest in the Cascade Mountain range was recorded during the 1950s and 1960s. Land area affected by the adelgid in the Pacific Northwest has increased from 83,325 acres (337 km^{2}) in 2004 to 108,128 acres (438 km^{2}) in 2005.
