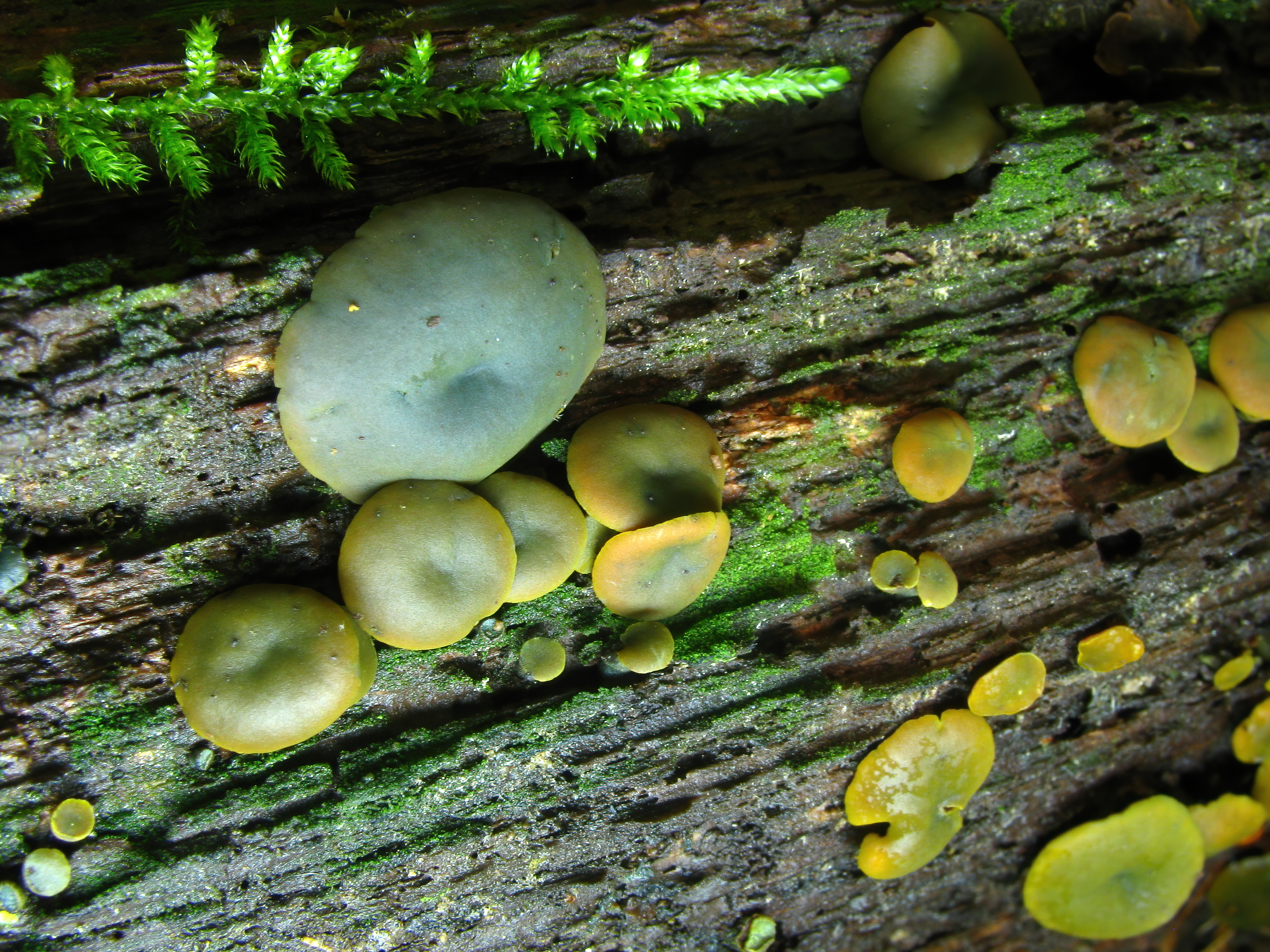
- Chlorencoelia versiformis

Scientific classification
- Kingdom: Fungi
- Division: Ascomycota
- Class: Leotiomycetes
- Order: Helotiales
- Family: Cenangiaceae

Genera
- Allescheria; Cenangina; Cenangiopsis; Cenangium; Chlorencoelia; Clithris; Crumenula; Crumenulopsis; Encoelia; Fabrella; Heyderia; Mitrula; Phaeangella; Phibalis; Pyrenotrochila; Rhabdocline; Rhabdogloeum; Sarcotrochila; Trochila; Velutarina

= Cenangiaceae =

Family of fungi

The Cenangiaceae are a family of fungi in the order Helotiales.

== Hemiphacidiaceae ==
The family Hemiphacidiaceae was traditionally a separate family, but was merged with Cenangiaceae in the 2010s. The type genus was originally Hemiphacidium, but was later renamed to Sarcotrochila. The 26 species in this family are limited in distribution to northern temperate zones. Genera traditionally part of Hemiphacidiaceae include:

- Chlorencoelia
- Fabrella
- Heyderia
- Korfia
- Rhabdocline
- Sarcotrochila
