= Christmas tree production in the United States =

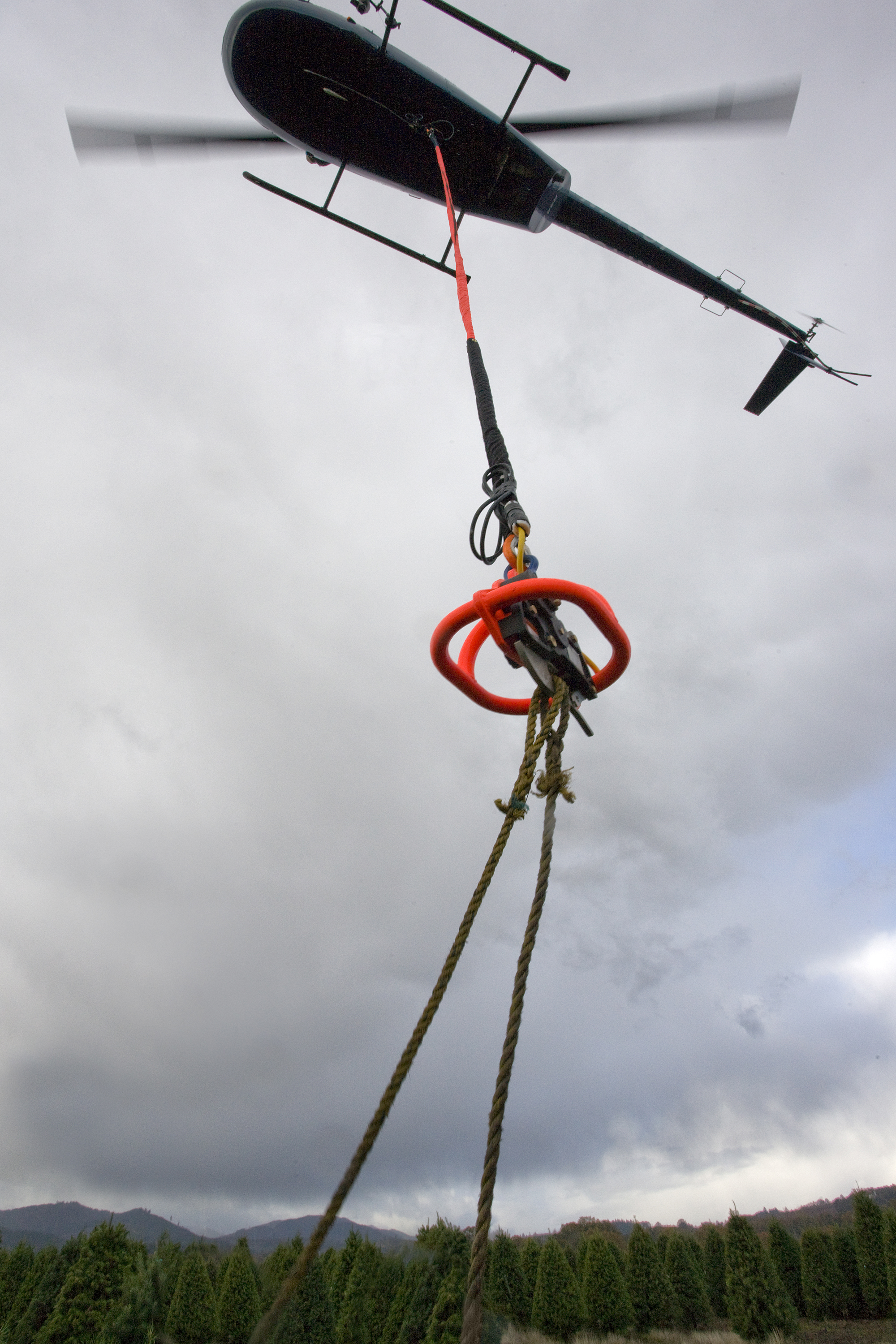
A Robinson R44 Raven II helicopter lifting Christmas trees using a belly hook, a long line, and a remote hook at a Christmas tree farm in Oregon

While the first Christmas tree farm appeared as early as 1860, Christmas tree production in the United States was largely limited to what could be harvested from natural forests until the 1950s. Among the important Christmas tree producing areas in the U.S. are Wisconsin, North Carolina, Pennsylvania and the Pacific Northwest. In 2002 Christmas tree production in the United States totaled 20.8 million trees and the U.S. was one of the world's leading producers of natural Christmas trees. That same year, Pennsylvania was the top producer in the United States.

== History ==
The first Christmas tree farm in the United States was in operation by 1860, when Maine Christmas tree farmers Thomas W. Jackson Jr. and his son Herbert A. Jackson of Portland were selling Christmas trees in New York City. In 1888, George E. Wagner founded the Wagner Tree Farm on 1,700 acres near Pocono Lake, PA. He and his son, Sterling R. Wagner, achieved recognition in the fields of forestry and conservation. A WB&E rail spur provided an outlet for forest products, coal, blueberries, and 1,500 Christmas trees annually. "" Despite the early pioneers of the industry, by the late 1940s 90 percent of all natural Christmas trees sold in the United States were still harvested from forests. The most popular species during that era, Balsam Fir, Douglas-fir, Black Spruce and White Spruce, were all readily available from forests.

Following World War II more trees began to be planted in plantations. Other changes were taking place as well, in the late 1940s and early 1950s farmers began to shear trees in response to customer demand for denser trees. During the 1960s the market for Christmas trees in the United States began to change. The number of part-time growers declined, while some part-time growers ceased operations others expanded their operations and became full-time Christmas tree farmers. Expansion occurred in all major U.S. Christmas tree growing regions, Michigan, the Pacific Northwest and North Carolina.

The number of plantings increased during the late 1970s and continued to do so into the 1980s. From 1977 to 1979 total U.S. production reached about 29 million Christmas trees annually. One species, Scots Pine was planted in numbers which far exceeded demand for the product. As the number of individual farmers increased, better marketing strategies and promotion programs were developed. Helicopters became a fixture on large farms during the early 1980s as growers used them to move trees from the field to the shipping yard. Between 1988 and 1994 U.S. the number of Christmas trees harvested in the U.S. was about 34–36 million per year.

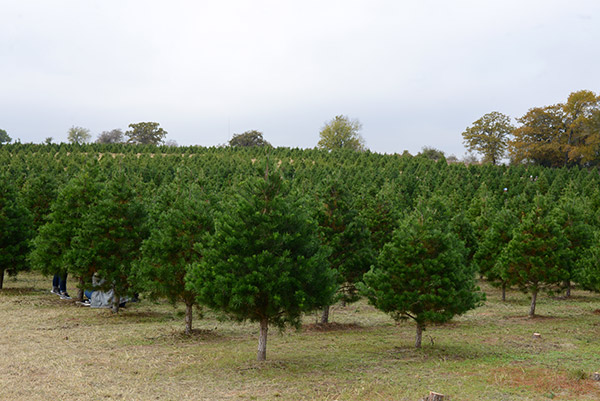
Christmas tree farm in Texas

In 2002, in the United States, 21,904 Christmas tree farms covered 447,000 acres (1,810 km^{2}) of cropland and accounted for 20.8 million Christmas trees cut. Of those farms, 686 harvested 100 acres (0.40 km^{2}) or more, which accounted for over 196,000 of the total acres of trees harvested. That same year, there were only three U.S. Christmas tree farms with more than 10,000 acres (40 km^{2}) of cropland in production. Pennsylvania was home to the most American Christmas tree farms in 2002; the state boasted 2,164 farms. Oregon, however, had the most acreage devoted to the crop with 67,800 acres being used for Christmas tree farming.

The total U.S. crop in 2004 was valued at $506 million with $143 million attributed to the nation's leading producer in 2004, Oregon. Oregon was followed in production numbers by North Carolina, Washington, and Michigan.

== North Carolina ==
In 2002 about 2.9 million Christmas trees were harvested in the state of North Carolina, second behind only Oregon in terms of trees cut. By 2004 the crop in North Carolina was worth more than $100 million. The North Carolina Department of Agriculture stated that 18% of natural Christmas tree harvested in the United States come from the 42 million trees planted by 1,500 growers in the states.

== Pacific Northwest ==
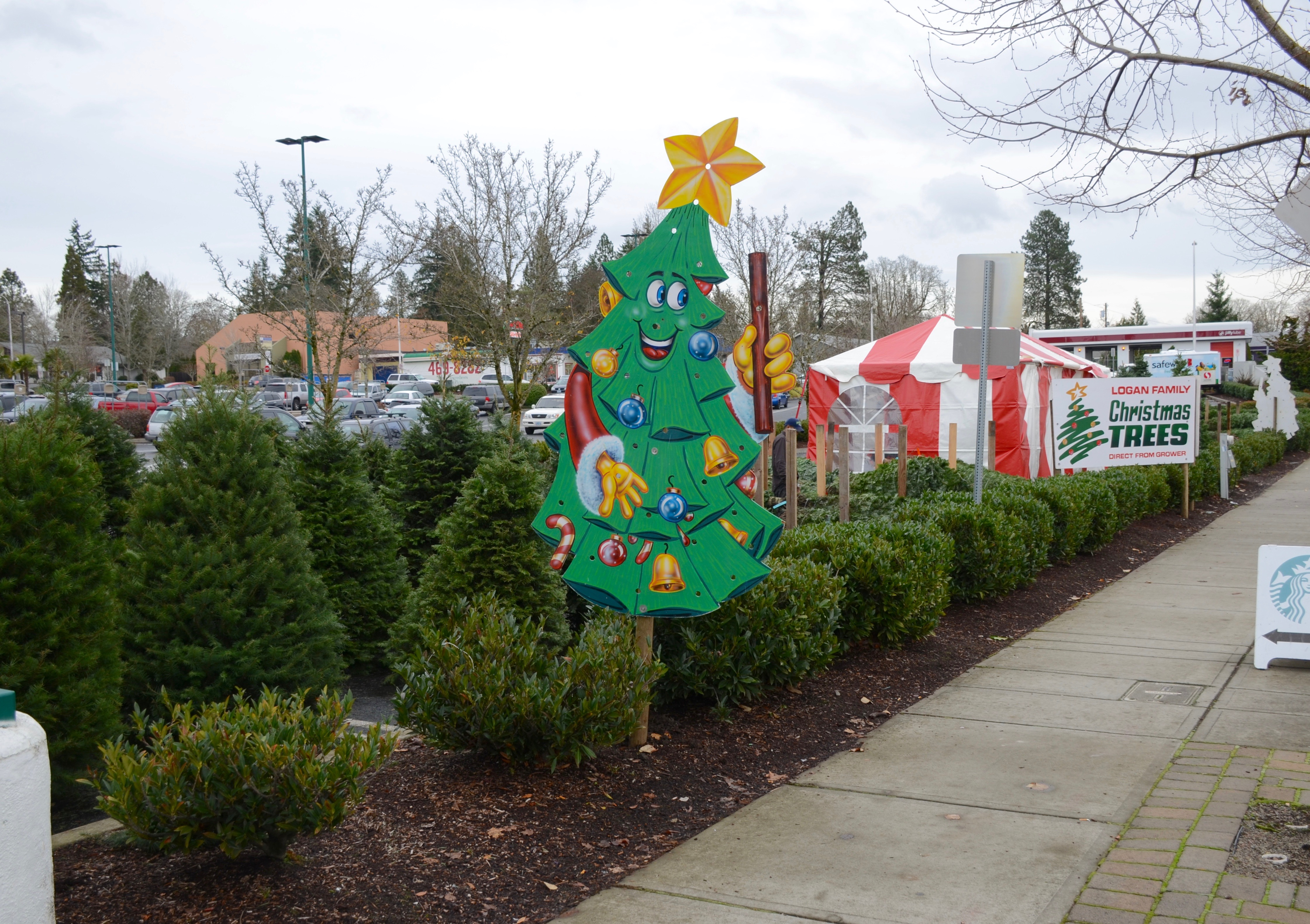
A Christmas tree lot in the suburbs of Portland, Oregon

Oregon and Washington are among the most important U.S. states in the production of Christmas trees. 92% of the crop produced in this region consists of Douglas fir and Noble fir species. Other species produced in this region include grand fir, balsam fir, Nordmann fir, Colorado blue spruce and Norway spruce trees.

Currently approximately 92% of Christmas trees grown in the Pacific Northwest are exported out of the region. California is the largest market for Pacific Northwest Christmas trees, purchasing 45% of the crop. Other large foreign export destinations include China, Japan, Mexico and Philippines.

In 2015, Oregon had approximately 700 Christmas tree farms with a combined 63,000 acres, yielding 7.2 million Christmas trees valued at approximately $120 million. The majority of Christmas tree production occurs in the Willamette Valley region including Benton, Clackamas, Marion, Polk and Yamhill counties.

In 2015, Washington State had approximately 250 Christmas tree farms with a combined 23,000 acres, yielding 2.3 million Christmas trees valued at approximately $35 million. The majority of Christmas tree production occurs in the western and southern portions of the Puget Sound region including Kitsap, Lewis, Mason and Thurston counties.

== Pennsylvania ==
In the year 2021 Pennsylvania ranked 4th behind #1 Oregon, #2 North Carolina and #3 Michigan in Christmas trees harvested with 1,010,620 on 30,544 acres. Unlike other top Christmas tree producing states, Pennsylvania's production is spread out across the state with several counties jumping in on production. Pennsylvania's leading county in production is York County which is on the southern border of the state, south of Harrisburg. More than 7.5% of Christmas trees are produced in the farmlands between Philadelphia and Pittsburgh.

== Great Lakes states ==
Aside from Pennsylvania, several U.S. states in the Great Lakes region are key Christmas tree producers. The two most important production areas are Michigan, one of the leading U.S. producers, and Wisconsin.

Michigan's Christmas tree industry is worth around $60 million per year. Seventy-five percent of the Christmas trees harvested from the 850 Michigan tree farms are exported out of state for sale elsewhere. Christmas tree farms in Michigan covered 54,000 acres in 2004. 2008 estimates from a Michigan State University educator put the state's annual crop still at around $60 million in value annually but she estimated the acreage at 42,000 and the number of growers at 780. Grand Traverse, Missaukee, Oceana and Wexford counties (and most prominently the area around M-42 near Manton) produce the most trees in the state, with Lake City being known as Michigan's "Christmas Tree Capital".

== Maine ==
Since the 1860s, Maine has been a producer of Christmas trees and Christmas wreaths. Its 370 Christmas tree farms produce roughly 100,000 trees each year, and generate an estimated $19 million in direct economic impact annually and support 800 jobs. Many of Maine's Christmas tree farms are small, family-run operations that offer pick-your-own trees or sell trees at roadside stands. Ninety percent of Christmas trees grown in Maine are balsam firs, the only fir tree native to Maine.

== Other regions ==
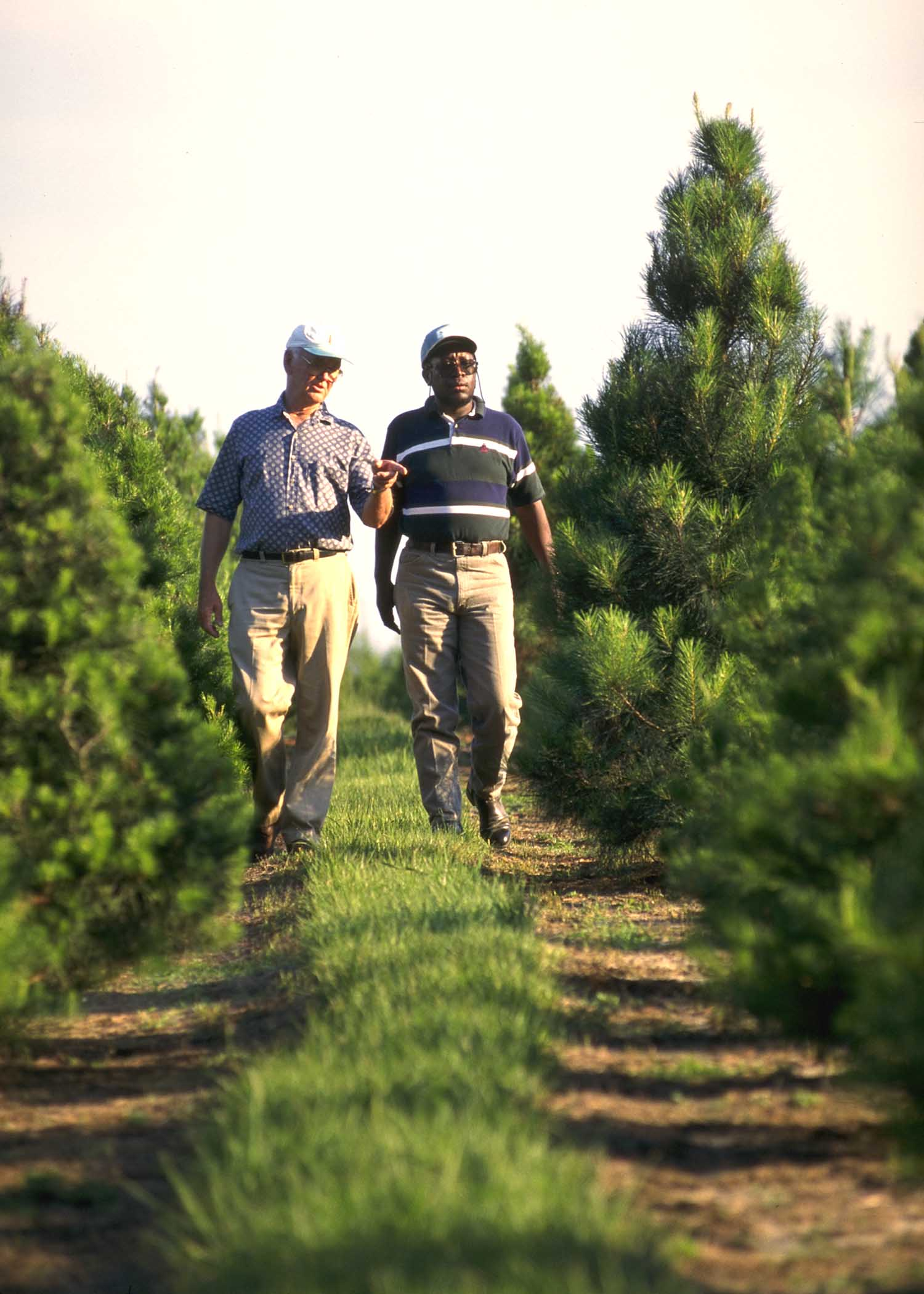
A Christmas tree farmer in the US state of Florida explains the pruning and shearing process of cultivation to a government employee.

Trees are grown across the United States in varying conditions, Christmas trees are grown in all 50 U.S. states including Alaska and Hawaii. In the U.S. state of Alabama there are almost 100 Christmas tree farms which average 800 trees annually. Ninety percent of Alabama's tree farms are "choose and cut" type operations which allow customers to visit and cut their own live Christmas tree.

== Market ==
It was around Christmas 1851 when a farmer in the US state of New York's Catskill Mountains, Mark Carr, began a journey with two oxen drawn sleds toward New York City with a crop of Christmas trees in tow. When he arrived in New York the first Christmas tree market was born, from which he sold all the trees. Though Christmas trees have been sold commercially in the United States since Carr's 1851 journey from the Catskills, the first American Christmas tree farm was not established until about 50 years later. Until then, most U.S. Christmas trees were entirely harvested from forests. In the 21st century, worldwide, 98 percent of all live Christmas trees sold are grown on Christmas tree farms.

The market for natural Christmas trees in the United States began to tumble when an oversupply during the late 1980s through the mid-1990s sent prices downward. In 1992, harvests of around 850,000 trees in New England were considered too many and Christmas trees sold for around US$5 as opposed to the usual $18–$30 each. Natural Christmas tree use continued to decline over the next decade, in part, due to the continued rise in popularity of artificial trees. In U.S. states where a marginal number of trees were grown, many growers were driven out of business.

In 1998, an ice storm affected the North American continent from Ontario to Quebec to New England, afterward it was referred to as the "storm of the century." The storm wiped out much of the Christmas tree crop in eastern Ontario and Quebec. Assessors in Ontario toured 55 Christmas tree farms and deemed, on average, that around 15–20 percent of the trees on each plantation were non-recoverable. Growers received financial assistance from the Canadian government.

== Real versus artificial ==
In 1992, in the United States, about 46 percent of homes displaying Christmas trees displayed an artificial tree. Twelve years later, a 2004 ABC News/Washington Post poll revealed that 58 percent of U.S. residents used an artificial tree instead of a natural tree. The real versus artificial tree debate has been popular in mass media through the early 21st century. The debate is a frequent topic of news articles during the Christmas holiday season. Early 21st century coverage of the debate focused on the decrease in natural Christmas tree sales, and rise in artificial tree sales over the late 1990s and early 2000s. In 2004, the U.S. Christmas tree industry, represented by the National Christmas Tree Association, hired the advertising agency Smith Harroff to spearhead an ad campaign aimed at rejuvenating lagging sales of natural trees.

About 35 million U.S. households displayed natural Christmas trees in 1990, slightly outpaced by the 36.3 million homes that opted for artificial trees that same year. By 2000, the split was more dramatic with 50.6 million homes using artificial trees, while 32 million chose natural Christmas trees. Sales of natural trees continued to slide after 2000, and by 2003 sales of natural trees reached 23.4 million. During the same period, artificial tree sales rose from 7.3 million to 9.6 million annually.

== See also ==
- Christmas tree production
- Christmas tree production in Canada
