= Christmas tree production in Mexico =

Until the 1990s most Christmas tree production in Mexico was limited to what could be taken from natural forests. Beginning in the 1990s trees were grown on plantations and in nurseries. By 2008 Mexico produced 800,000 Christmas trees domestically. A notable nursery is the Bosque de los arboles de navidad (Christmas trees forest) in Amecameca, State of Mexico.

== Production history ==
During the 1970s and 1980s domestic production of natural Christmas trees was done through natural forests, a shift began in the 1980s and, especially, the 1990s toward plantations and nurseries. Between 1981 and 1989 a considerable number of trees were still taken from natural forests, though nurseries and plantation began to be used. However, between 1990 and 1999 trees were only taken from natural forests one time, in 1995. Between 1981 and 1999, domestic production in Mexico went from 407,000 trees to 635,000 trees. From 1981 to 1989 the peak year for production was 1986 when 800,000 trees were taken from forests, and grown on plantation and nurseries. Between 1990 and 1999 peak production came in 1994 at 698,000 trees, almost all of them were grown at nurseries.

In 2004 Mexican Christmas tree production amounted to about 600,000 trees annually on 2000 hectares of land. That same year, the U.S. Department of Agriculture (USDA) reported that the majority of Christmas tree farming in Mexico took place in three states, Mexico (424 hectares), Nuevo León (89 hectares) and Veracruz (60 hectares).

For the years 2008 and 2010 around 800,000 Christmas trees were grown in Mexico on 500 hectares of land. The USDA reported in 2011 that the majority of Christmas tree production in Mexico took place in the State of Mexico, 60 percent. However, tree production still took place in Nuevo León, Veracruz, as well as the states of Mexico City, Puebla, Jalisco, and Guanajuato.

== Market ==
Much of Mexico's demand for Christmas trees (around 1.8 million annually) is met through importation. In 2004 the United States enjoyed a 95 percent market share on tree imports. By 2009 the U.S. still exported nearly 1 million trees to Mexico each year, with a small amount coming from production in Canada.

In 2004 many Mexican tree producers sold their crop directly from their production areas, though a few farmers utilized local retail markets.

== Trees ==
A 2004 USDA report on Mexican Christmas tree farming noted that the majority of Mexican produced Christmas trees were of the species Mexican White Pine (Pinus Ayacahuite), Mexican Pinyon (Pinus Cembroides), and Sacred Fir (Oyamel - Abies Religiosa). In 2011 the USDA included a more exhaustive list in a report of Mexican tree farming that included: Mexican White Pine (Pinus ayacahuite), Douglas Fir, Mexican Pinyon, Sacred Fir, and the Aleppo pine (Pinus halepensis).

== See also ==
Christmas in Mexico
