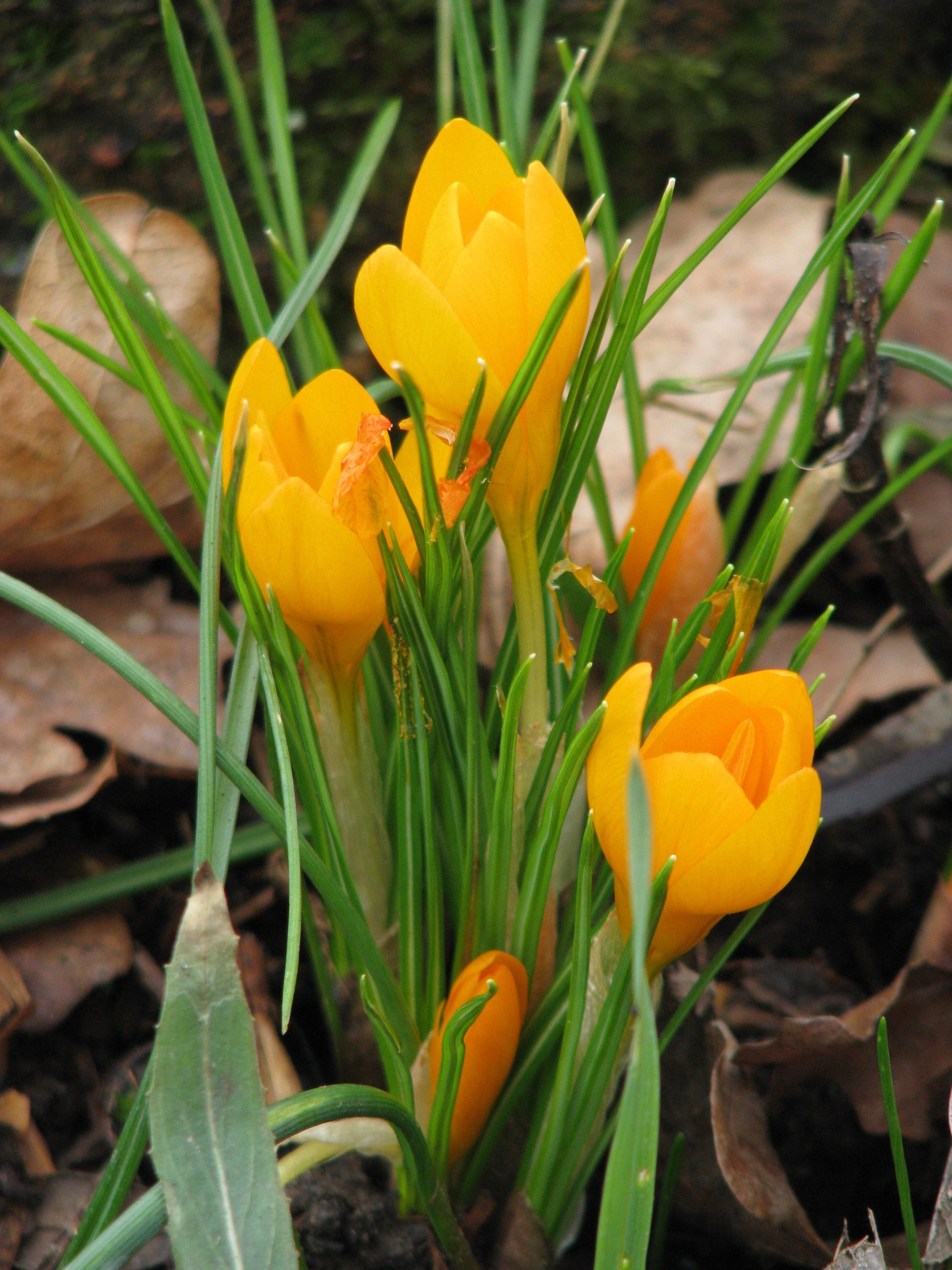
- Crocus gargaricus

Scientific classification
- Kingdom: Plantae
- Clade: Tracheophytes
- Clade: Angiosperms
- Clade: Monocots
- Order: Asparagales
- Family: Iridaceae
- Genus: Crocus
- Species: C. gargaricus

Binomial name
- Crocus gargaricus Herb.

Synonyms
- Crocus aureus E.D.Clarke; Crocus gargaricus var. citrinus Herb.; Crocus gargaricus var. panchrysus Herb.

= Crocus gargaricus =

Species of flowering plant

Crocus gargaricus is a species of flowering plant in the family Iridaceae. It is a cormous perennial native to Turkey.

Crocus gargaricus grows only on Kaz Dag, also known as Mount Ida. The rarity in its cultivation is due to its being recently recognized as its own distinct flowering plant.

== Description ==
Crocus gargaricus is a herbaceous perennial geophyte growing from a corm. It is a small crocus species with bright yellow (occasionally lemon yellow) to orange flowers that commonly has orange, three branched, styles. The corms are small with finely netted, fibrous tunics. Corms produce three or four leaves, about 2mm wide, that emerge from the soil about the same time flowering occurs. Flowering occurs from February to March. Plants reproduce quickly, forming many short stolons that generate new corms.

== Habitat ==
Crocus gargaricus grows in damp pasture and open pine woodlands at an elevation range of 1200 to 2300 meters. Often found near snow melt in mountain meadows with peaty soils, growing with Pinus nigra ssp. pallasiana and Abies nordmanniana ssp. bornmuelleria.
