= Christmas in Mexico =

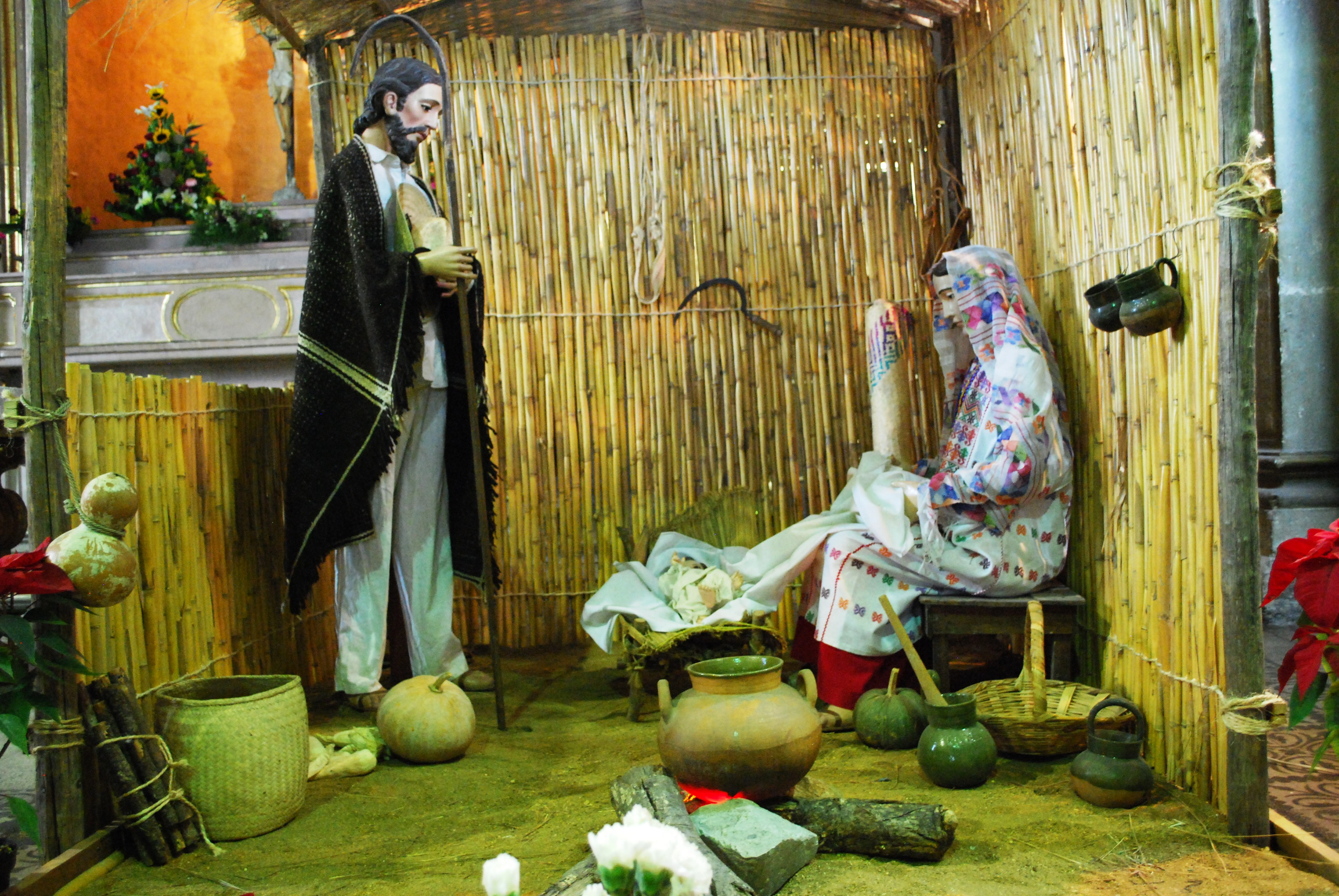
Part of a nativity scene from the Church of the Company of Jesus in the city of Oaxaca. Joseph and Mary are dressed in Oaxacan clothing.

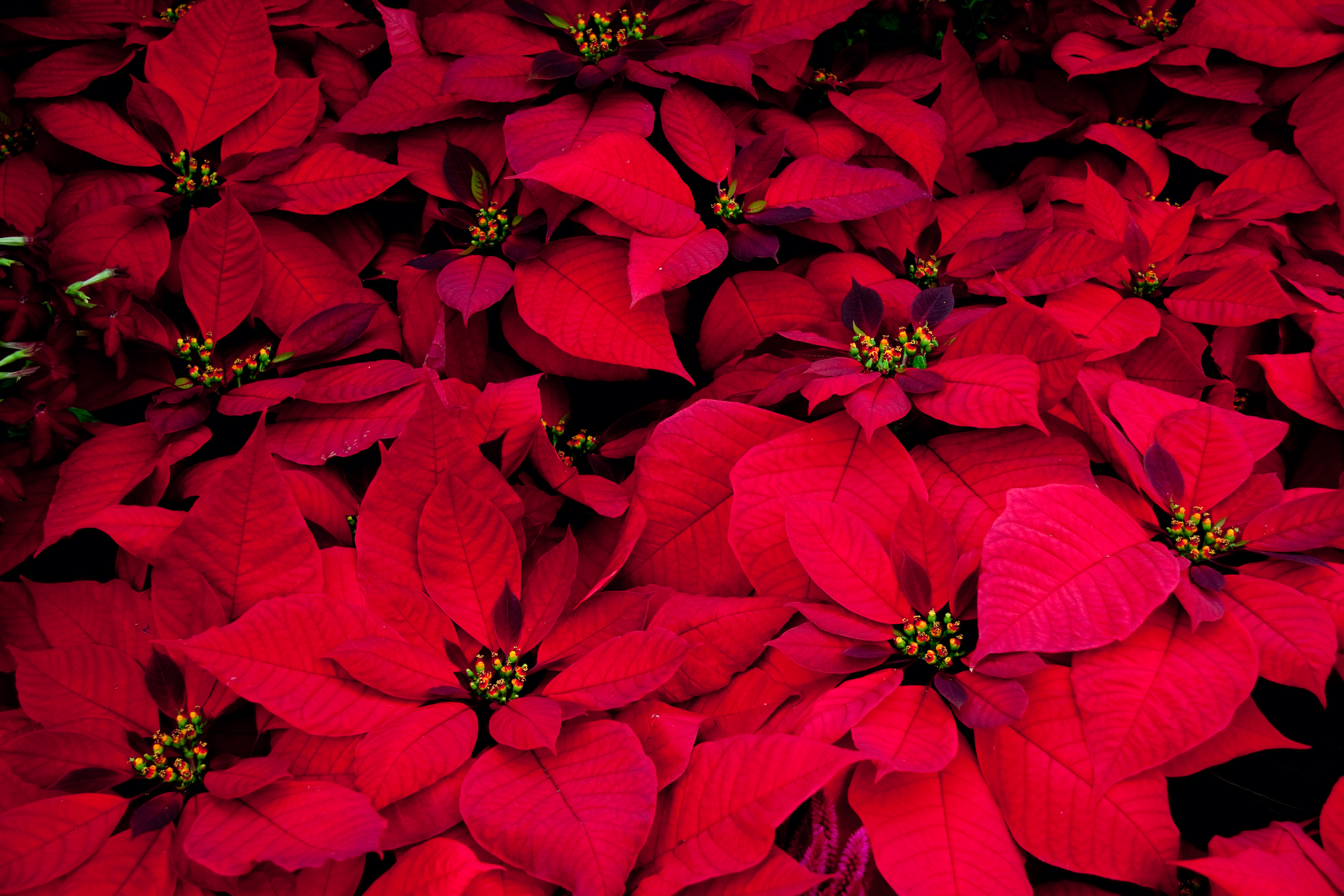
The monter (poinsettia) is native to Mexico and is widely used as a decoration during Christmas time.

Christmas in Mexico is observed from December 12 to January 6, with one additional celebration on February 2. Traditional decorations displayed on this holiday include nativity scenes, poinsettias, and Christmas trees. The season begins with celebrations related to the Virgin of Guadalupe, the Patroness of Mexico, followed by traditions such as Las Posadas and Pastorelas.

On Christmas Eve, there is a mass and feast. On January 6, the arrival of the Three Wise Men is celebrated with Candlemas and the presentation of images of Jesus as a child at churches. These traditions were formed from influences in both the pre-Hispanic period and Mexico's colonial period, thus incorporating indigenous and Spanish practices. There are also a few influences from both Germany and the United States.

== Christmas season in Mexico ==
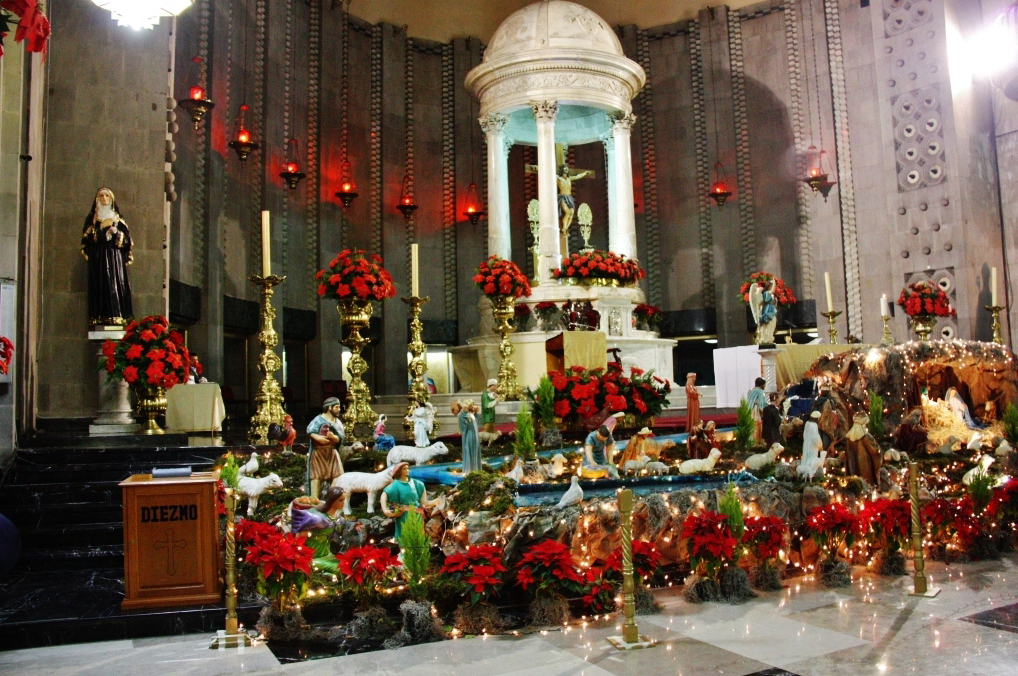
Altar of the Saint Augustinus Church in Miguel Hidalgo, Mexico City, decorated for Christmas

The Christmas season in Mexico runs from December 12 to January 6, with one final celebration on February 2. Christmas traditions incorporate remnants of indigenous practices, customs from Spain, novel Mexican inventions from the colonial period, and later elements from the United States and Germany.

Market activities start in late November, with traditional markets and new Tianguis (street) markets appearing. Stalls are dedicated to selling gifts and decorations including traditional poinsettias and nativity scenes, as well as Christmas trees, ornaments, electric lights, and reindeer figures.

Starting in December, residential units, homes, and buildings are decorated with poinsettias named "Noche Buena" (from the Spanish phrase that means "good night" referring to Christmas Eve). In the pre-Hispanic period, they were called "Cuetlaxochitl", and were appreciated in the mid-winter. Poinsettias were cherished because indigenous people believed they were a symbol of fallen warriors receiving new life, who they believed returned as hummingbirds to drink the nectar of these flowers. A modern Mexican legend says that the poinsettia was once a weed that miraculously turned into a beautiful flower so that a child could present it to the infant Jesus. The name for this plant is also used to refer to a dark bock-style beer which is only available during the Christmas season.

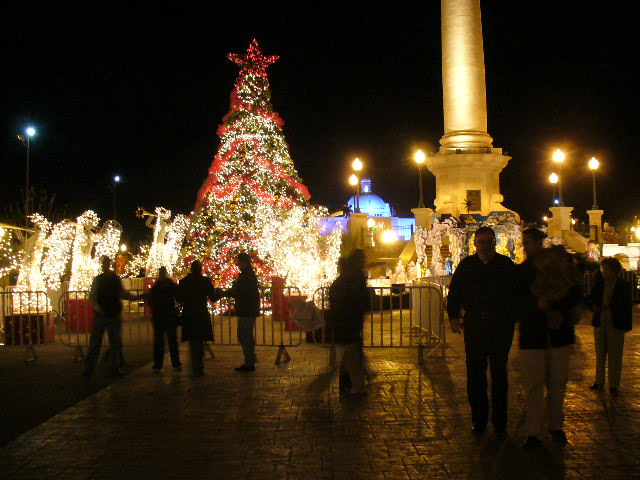
Christmas tree and lights in the main plaza of the city of Chihuahua

Since the second half of the 20th century, Mexico has adopted a number of German and U.S. Christmas traditions. Christmas trees were originally imported into Mexico for the expatriate community, but have since become more popular with the Mexican population, often placed with more traditional nativity scenes. Christmas trees have become more common as household incomes rise and tree prices fall, with artificial trees easily available from stores like Walmart, Costco, and local Mexican chain stores. Live trees are also common, and Christmas tree production in Mexico is now a large industry. Less-fortunate families that cannot afford live trees often seek small artificial trees, branches, or shrubs.

In 2009, Mexico hosted the world's largest Christmas tree, according to Guinness, at 110.35 meters (approximately 362 feet) high and weighing in at a staggering 330 tons on Glorieta de la Palma at Paseo de la Reforma. Santa Claus, depicted in his traditional red winter clothing, appears as well. Before Christmas Day, it is not uncommon to see stands with Santa Claus. Parents take advantage of this opportunity to take memorable pictures of their kids. After Christmas Day, these stands have one or more "Wise Men".

Many children get presents from both Santa Claus and the Wise Men, although they tend to get more from the Wise Men because "there are three of them". Public Christmas celebrations mix Mexican and foreign traditions. Mexico City sponsors a Christmas season display in the city's main square (or Zocalo), complete with a towering Christmas tree and an ice rink. Nativity scenes are placed here and along Paseo de la Reforma.

During Christmas, it is common to hear both traditional and contemporary Christmas music. Traditional music includes villancicos (akin to Christmas carols) with popular songs including: "Los pastores a Belén"; "Riu, riu, chiu: El lobo rabioso"; and "Los peces en el río". Contemporary music includes Spanish covers of foreign music, such as "Jingle Bells".

== Nativity scenes ==
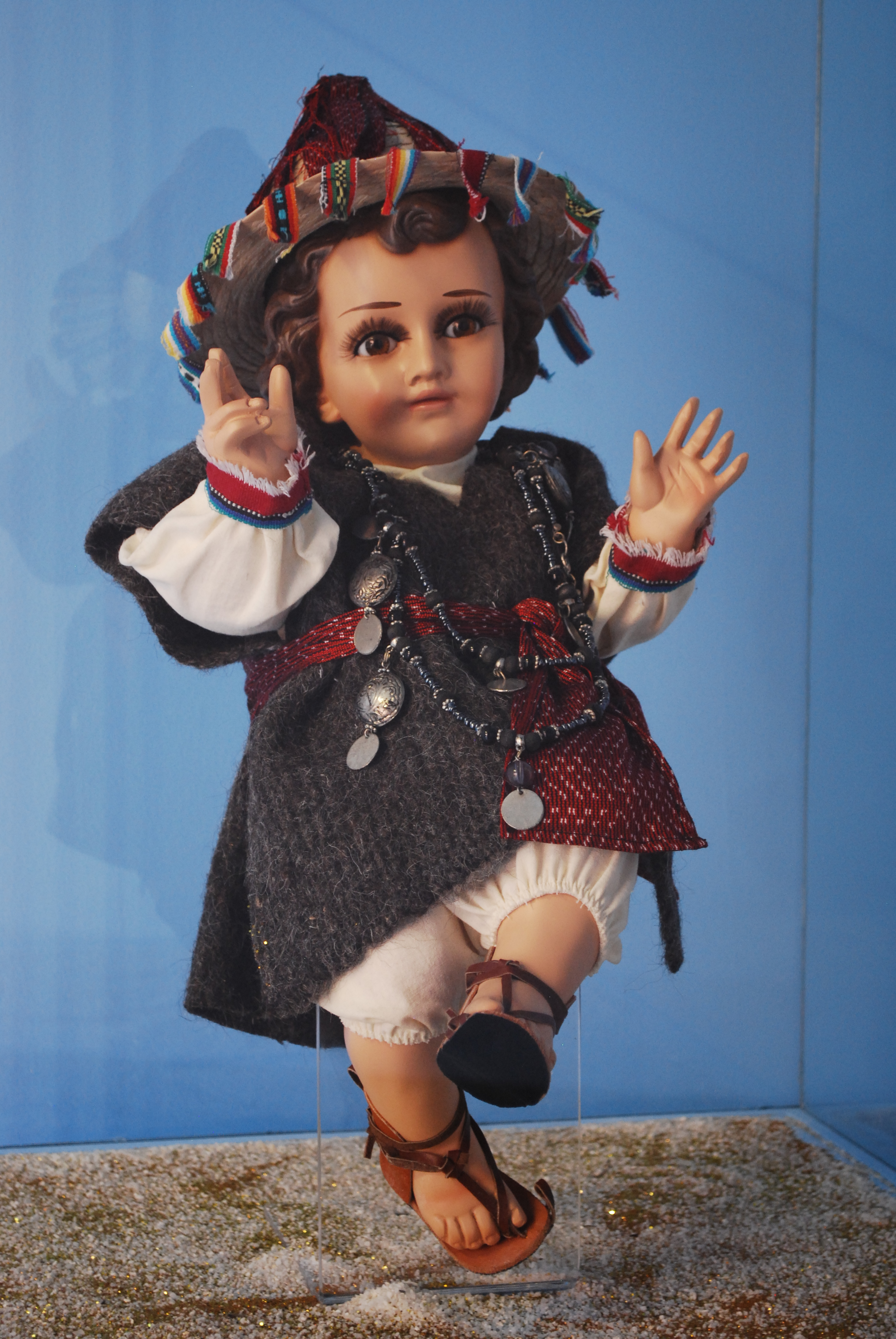
Niño Dios (Child Jesus) dressed in Tzotzil costume

The most traditional and important Navidad decoration is the nativity scene. It is generally set up by December 12, left on display until February 2, and is found in homes and churches. Nativity scenes were introduced to Mexico in the early colonial period when the first Mexican monks taught the Indigenous people to carve the figures. The basic setup is similar to those in other parts of the world, with a focus on the Holy Family, surrounded by angels, shepherds, and animals. The figures are sheltered by a portal that can take the shape of a cave, stone house, or cabin. Above the scene is a star, often with LED lights.

Since the colonial period, a Mexican touch has been introduced, starting with the use of Spanish moss covering the base. The scene is missing the figure of Child Jesus until Christmas Eve. Although all the other figures are generally proportional to the rest of the scene, the figure of Jesus is much larger – almost that of a life-sized baby. This figure is not only central to the nativity scene but is also important to a tradition of bringing the figure to church on February 2 to be blessed.

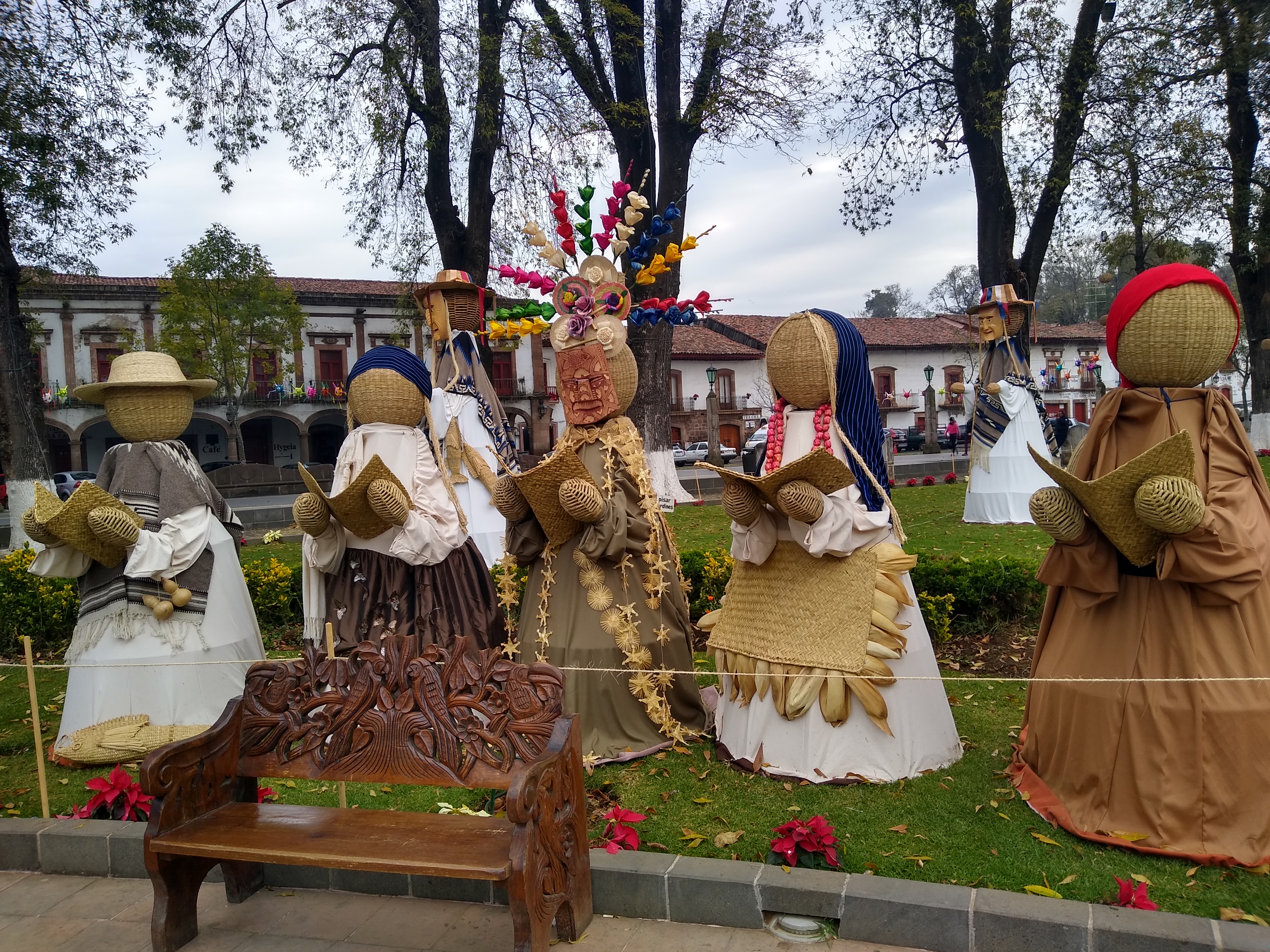
Part of the monumental nativity in the Vasco de Quiroga Plaza in Pátzcuaro, displaying the traditional plant-fiber crafts of Michoacán.

Traditional figures are made from ceramic or plaster. One of the more traditional areas that produce ceramic figures for nativity scenes is the Guadalajara area, especially the towns of Tonalá and Tlaquepaque. From late November into December, the Tonalá market has dozens of stalls that sell nothing but supplies for nativity scenes. In addition to the more usual figures, Mexican nativity scenes have a number of several unique ones. These include native Mexican plants and animals such as nopal cacti and turkeys, women making tortillas, fish in a river (a reference to a popular Mexican carol), a crowing rooster (a reference to Christmas Eve), and even images of Lucifer to hide in the shadows (a reference to the pastorelas).

Nativity scenes can be found in all sizes and complexities. Large-scale nativity scenes can be quite elaborate, with multiple landscapes and even entire villages. These usually start with a base of sturdy brown paper, which is crumpled to simulate a landscape, sometimes with the support of multi-tiered bases. Over this base, moss, sawdust, sand, colored paper, paint, and more are used to recreate deserts, grassland, rivers, and lakes. Over these, a wide variety of structures and figures are placed that can include houses, churches, wells, vendors with carts of fruits and vegetables, playing children, musicians, dancers, cooking food, and more, all surrounding the center, in which is the Holy Family. The nativity scene of the main church in Chapala has featured imagery from all over the world including wooden shoes, an igloo, figures to represent Africans, and exotic animals.

== Pastorela ==
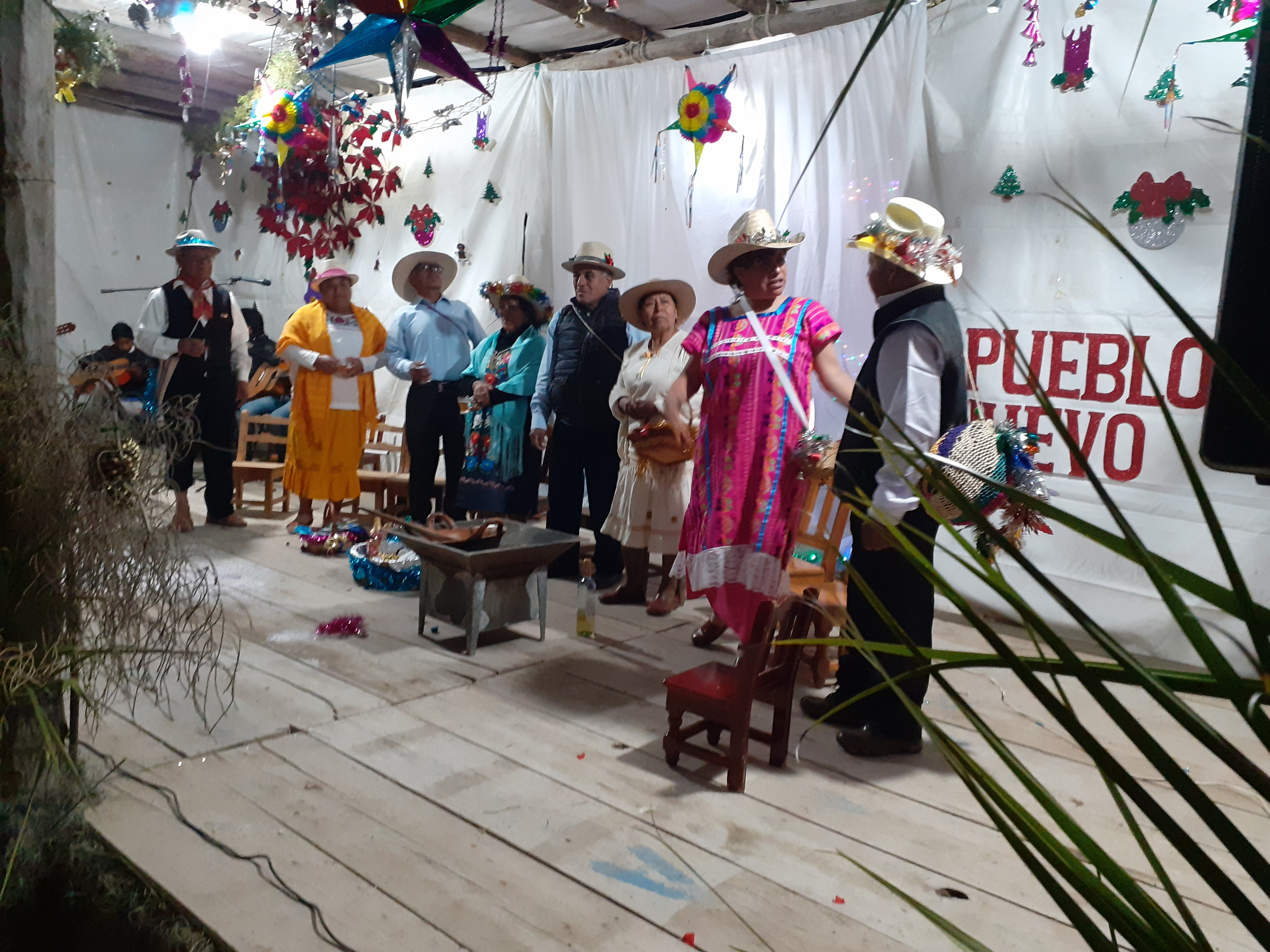
A pastorela in San Juan Achiutla, Oaxaca

=== History ===
Pastorela, which roughly means "shepherds' plays", are theatrical works performed by both amateur and professional groups during the Christmas season. The first pastorela in the New World occurred in the early 1700s with the establishment of early Spanish missions. Its origins are unknown, other than that it was orally passed down in Spain during Europe's Medieval period. In 1718, the Spanish settled along the San Antonio River and established a mission, forcing Native American inhabitants into new settlements adjacent to the church. The original purpose of these performances was to aid in Catholic conversion of the Native Americans. Soon afterward, there was a Spanish military settlement established across the river. In 1731, a group of Spanish colonists from the Canary Islands settled near these two communities, also along the river. These three communities then formed what is now known as the area of San Antonio.

At the time, there were three social classes across the San Antonio region; Elite Spanish settlers, middle-class Mexican families, and poor Mexican workers. The emergence of social classes is vital to understanding the Pastorales tradition; it took place around the time of the arrival of white settlers who possessed the ideal of manifest destiny.

Originally descended from medieval Spain, this play is performed entirely in Spanish. It was not until the mid-1900s that a translator was used, and it was not until 1913 that performances of Los Pastores made their way to Texas. "Between 1893 and 1953, at least one hundred twenty-five copies of this play relating to Christ's nativity have been discovered in the American Southwest and Mexico". They were originally developed as a didactic tool to teach the Christmas story.

=== The story ===
Los Pastores is considered to be a nativity play that has been performed on Christmas Eve since the first recorded performance in 1721. In the play, the shepherds meet Michael the Archangel for the first time and begin their journey to meet Jesus. Along the way, they encounter a hermit, the comedic character in this play. He often carries crosses made of corn cobs and constantly teases the audience. The shepherds and hermit fall asleep and are tempted by the Devil, also known as Luzbel, and his demons, who eventually try to lure him to Hell instead of to baby Jesus. The shepherds are unable to see the devils, but the hermit carries a rosary that allows him to see them. The Archangel challenges the Devils, defeating them and driving them back into the inferno. The shepherds finally reach Jesus, and the congregation joins them in a hymn to praise the birth of Jesus.

=== Rehearsals and performances ===
The rehearsal process for this play was not consistent; the time participants spent sharing stories and making memories was the most important aspect of putting on these shows. The final product of the production was not seen as having great importance in this community. These are not professional productions, and the main focus is to simply have the community come together to tell the story of Jesus. The script of the play is often improvised by the actors and varies immensely. It can include elements such as jokes, jeers, slang, songs, bawdy humor, discussions, cigarettes, tequila, and even prostitutes, mostly focusing on the interaction with and struggle against Satan and his tricks.

The most traditional of these plays are found in rural areas. Variations exist, from a focus on Mary and Joseph's travel to Bethlehem, battles between the Archangel Michael and the Devil, and registering with authorities. Some also contain feminist themes.

== Feast of the Virgin of Guadalupe ==
The Christmas season begins with celebrations in honor of the Virgin of Guadalupe, Mexico's patron saint. On December 3, a nine-day novena begins in honor of the Virgin of Guadalupe, which ends on her feast day of December 12. The most important event related to this time is the pilgrimage to her basilica in the north of Mexico City, with people coming to pay respects by all means of transportation, from airplanes to bicycles to walking. This pilgrimage is undertaken by a large number of Mexican Catholics, regardless of race or class. For example, every year, hundreds of members of the Japanese Mexican community (which is mainly Catholic) make the pilgrimage in kimono.

The area in and around the basilica begins to crowd with lights, fireworks, and Indigenous people dancing around dusk on December 11 and goes on all night and into the next day. The image of the Virgin Mary is honored in all of Mexico in various ways. In the city of Oaxaca, the main event is at Parque Llano on December 11, with small boys dressed as Juan Diego at the church to be blessed. In the very early morning hours of the 12th, the shrine resounds with the singing of Las Mañanitas to the Virgin Mary in a midnight concert, which features many Mexican singers. Masses are held not just in the Basilica but also in all community parishes within Mexico.

== Las Posadas ==
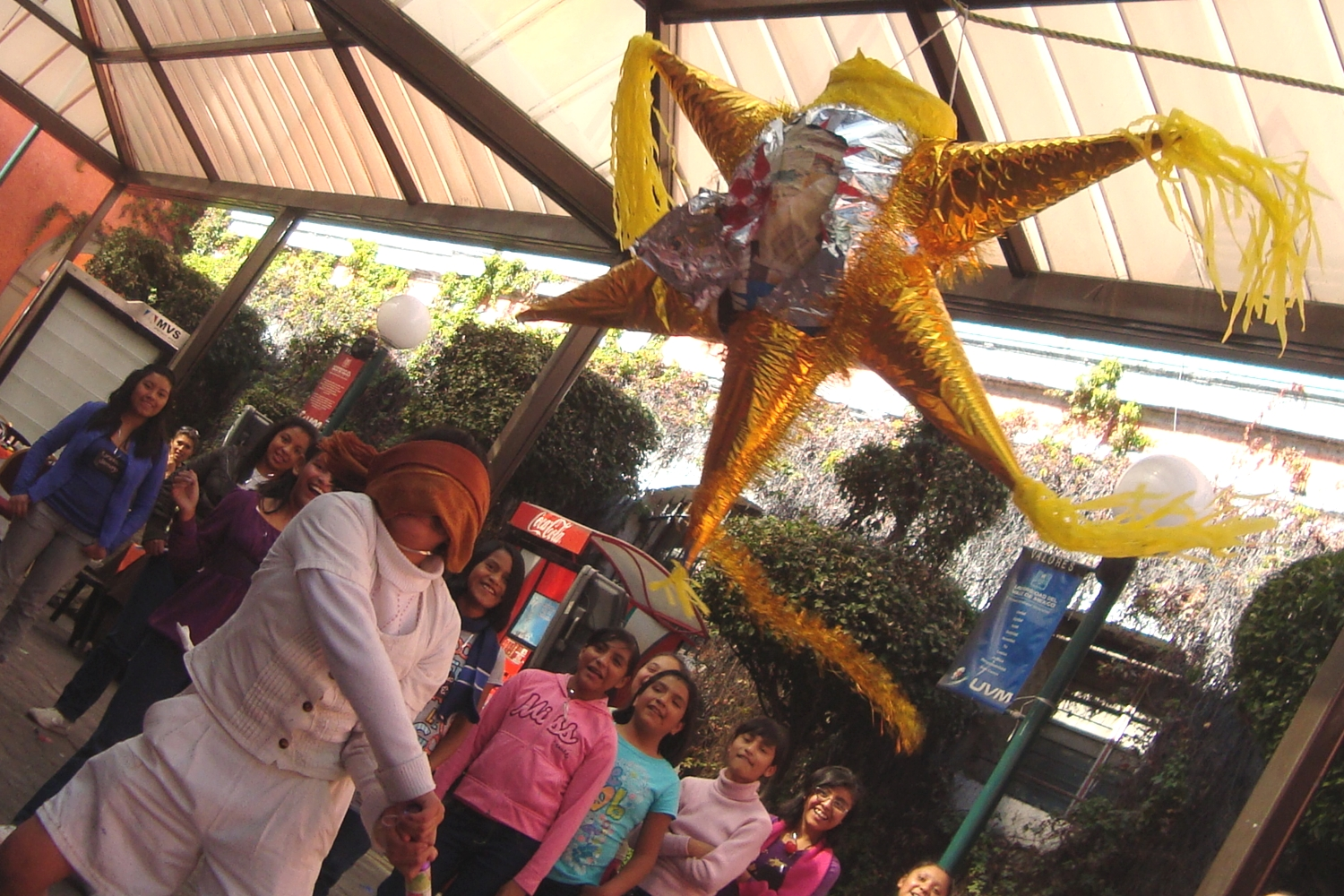
Breaking a piñata at a Posada

From December 16 to 24, there are a series of processions and parties called Las Posadas (from the word for inn). For many children, this is the most anticipated part of the Christmas season. The tradition was begun by Spanish evangelists to teach the Christmas story to the Indigenous people and ostensibly to supplant the rituals related to the birth of the god Huitzilopochtli.

Today, they are usually performed in rural areas and the lower-class neighborhoods of cities. The first part consists of a procession. The most traditional version involves heading out after dark each of the nine evenings from a local church. A girl and boy are chosen to play Mary and Joseph in costume, sometimes with Mary riding a donkey. The rest of the procession carries candles, paper lanterns and/or decorated staves, and often an empty manger. If no one is dressed as Mary and Joseph, the procession generally carries a nativity scene.

Las Posadas generally serves as a way to maintain community bonds with the neighborhood. In one variation, the procession arrives at a house and divides in two. One half remains outside and sings a traditional song to ask for shelter. The other sings the response from inside, and the ritual ends with everyone inside. The other variation has the procession go to three houses singing, two of which "reject" the party until the third house accepts.

The piñata started as a medium by which the Evangelists used to teach Christian beliefs to the natives. The traditional star-shaped piñata is broken by children during the Posadas. Like the procession, the Mexican piñata has a symbolic and didactic meaning. The vessel represents Satan, who has all the goods of the world, decorated to attract people. There are most traditionally seven points to represent the seven cardinal sins. The stick represents the Christian faith to defeat evil and release the treasure for all.

After piñatas, there is a meal which usually includes tamales, atole, buñuelos, and a hot drink called ponche, which is made from seasonal fruits such as tejocote, guava, plum, mandarin orange, orange and/or prune, sweetened with piloncillo, a kind of brown sugar, and spiced with cinnamon or vanilla. For adults, rum or tequila may be added. Ponche recipes vary greatly in Mexico. The Colima version usually includes milk, sugar, orange leaves, vanilla, and grated coconut.

At the end of a posada, guests receive a small gift called an aguinaldo, usually a package with cookies, dried and fresh fruit, and candy. Then, carols called villancicos are sung. A very old tradition has the song sung to the nativity scene, which includes the newborn Child Jesus.

== Christmas Eve and Christmas Day ==
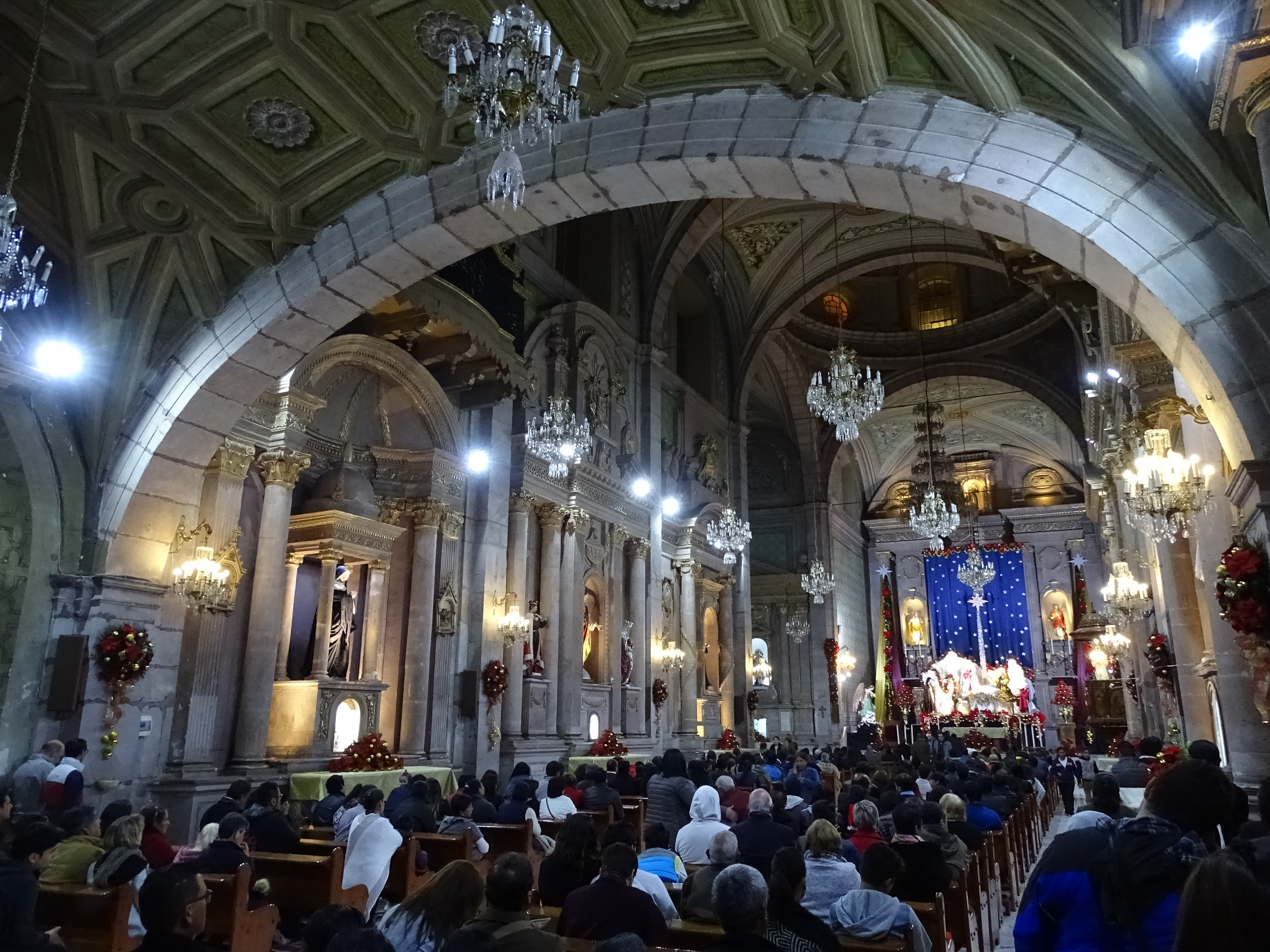
Christmas Eve mass in the city of Queretaro

The last posada is early Christmas Eve. What follows is a late-night Mass called the Mass of the Rooster. It originated about six years after the arrival of the Spanish when Father Pedro de Gante began a celebration of Christmas with a late-night Mass. The name comes from the tradition that the birth of Christ was announced by the crowing of a rooster. The celebration became popular among the newly converted Indigenous people as it included elements from the old celebrations for the Aztec deity Huitzilopochtli such as fireworks, torches, sparklers and plays along with food, and dancing.

Following the Mass, there is a traditional midnight feast. Traditional dishes include bacalao, reconstituted dried cod cooked with onions, tomato sauce, olives, and more. Another is revoltijo de romerito, which is green in a mole or pepita sauce, with potatoes and often dried shrimp. The most luxurious item on the menu used to be a suckling pig but this has mostly been replaced by turkey or ham. After dinner, adults drink ponche or cider and children play with sparklers, called Luces de Belén (Bethlehem lights).

Christmas presents are usually opened at the stroke of midnight. The rest of Christmas Day is quiet in Mexico as families recuperate from the festivities of the night before, often eating leftovers from the midnight dinner.

== Los Santos Inocentes ==
December 28 is Mexico's version of April Fools' Day, called Los Santos Inocentes (Feast of the Holy Innocents). It was originally called Los Santos Inocentes to commemorate the infants killed by King Herod to avoid the arrival of Christ. It is also said that on this day, one can borrow any item and not have to return it. In the 19th century, elaborate ruses would be concocted to get the gullible to lend things on this day. If successful, the victorious prankster would send a note to the lender and a gift of sweets or small toys in memory of the children killed by Herod with the note saying "Innocent little dove who allowed yourself to be deceived, knowing that on this day, nothing should be lent." This then developed into a day of pranks in general. This even includes newspapers printing false wild stories on that day. This has also been celebrated online in recent years.

== New Year's Eve ==
New Year's Eve falls during this time as well. It is celebrated much like most of the rest of the world with some exceptions. One notable tradition is the eating of twelve grapes rapidly along with the twelve chimes of the clock at midnight (a tradition shared with other Latin countries), to bring luck for each of the months of the coming year. Fireworks are common and in very rural areas, the festivities may also include shots fired in the air. In some parts of Veracruz, December 31 is reserved to honor elderly men with the Fiesta del Hombre Viejo.

== Three Kings' Day (Epiphany) ==
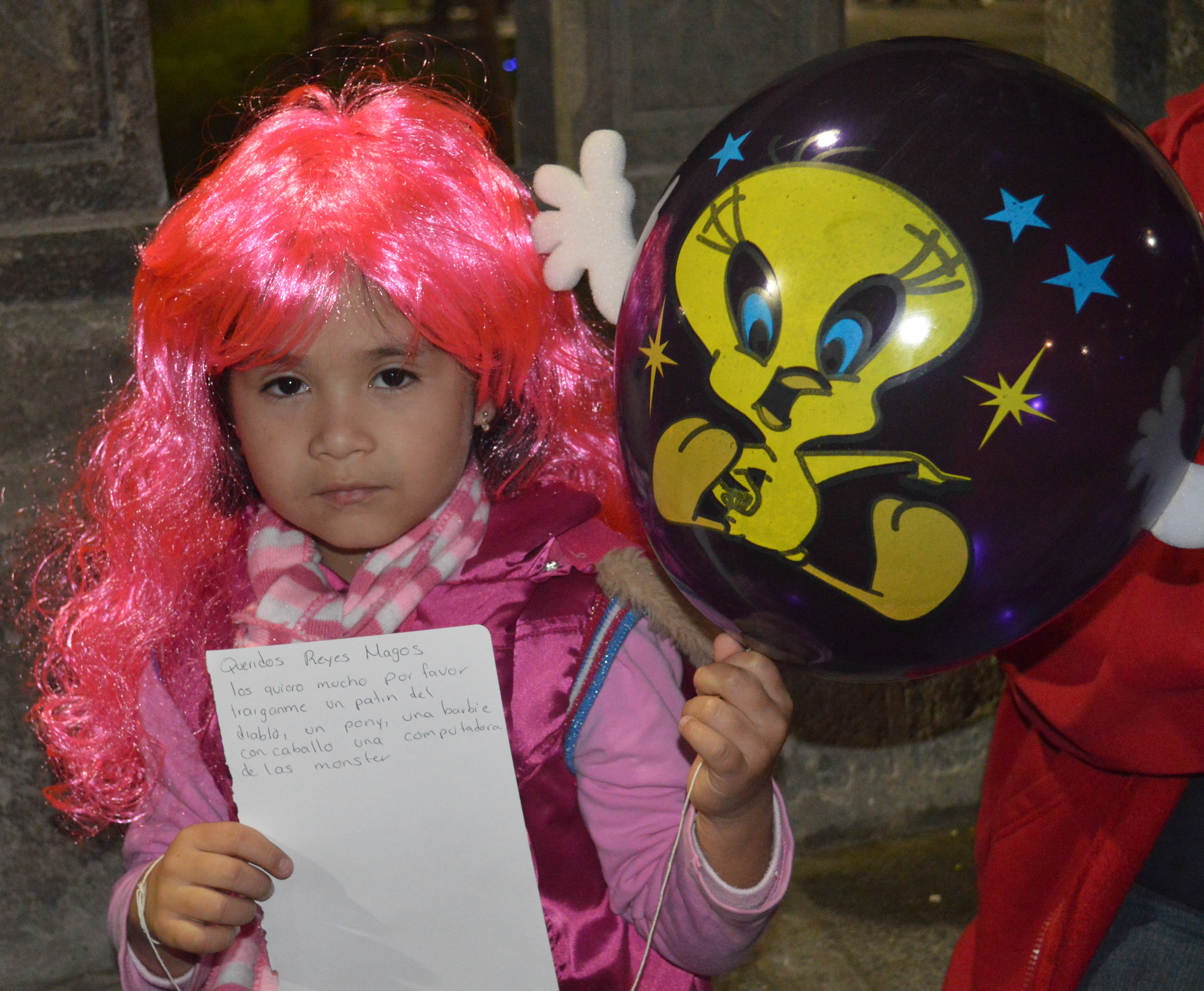
Girl with balloon and note to send to the Three Wise Men on the night before Three Kings' Day

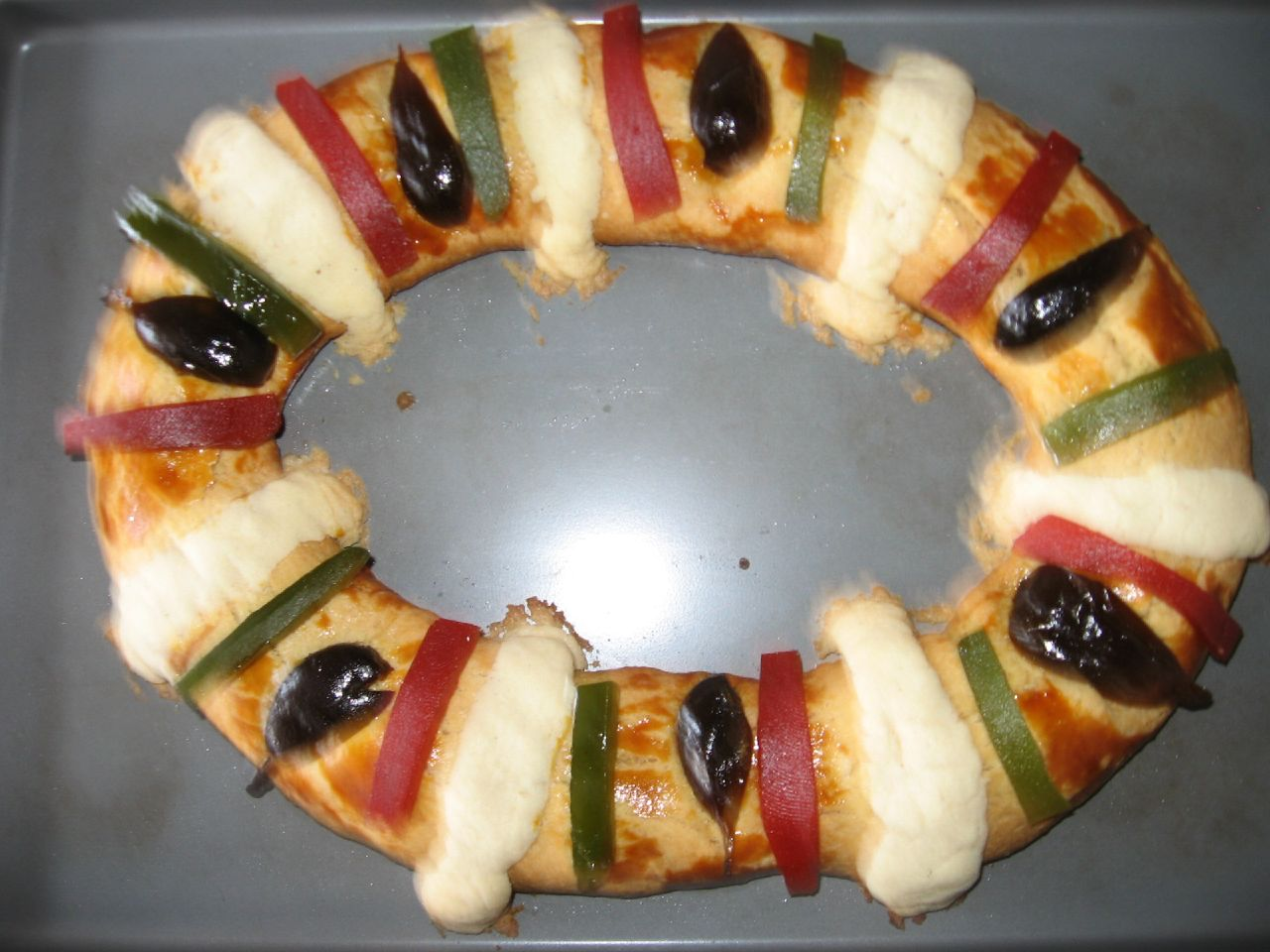
A rosca or rosca de reyes

The next major event in the Christmas season is Epiphany called Día de los Tres Reyes Magos (Three Kings' Day). This day celebrates when the Three Wise Men arrived to visit Child Jesus bearing gifts. On the night of January 5, children traditionally leave a shoe by the doorway where the Wise Men will enter, although this is not done in all parts of Mexico.

Another variation of this is sending the note in a helium balloon into the sky. Inside is a thoughtful note explaining why they have been good or bad that year and the gifts they would like if deemed worthy. In the morning after opening the presents, a round sweet bread called a rosca is served. It is baked with dried fruit and tiny images of the infant Jesus inside. Whoever gets one of these figures in their slice must pay for tamales for Candlemas on February 2. The rosca is served with tamales and atole.

== Candlemas ==
Candlemas is celebrated on February 2, as it commemorates the presentation of Child Jesus to the temple. On this day, people bring their images of Child Jesus to be blessed. These are elaborately dressed, traditionally in christening gowns, but many other costumes have since appeared as well. Afterwards, tamales and atole are shared, purchased by the people who found the miniature Jesus images on January 6.

== Regional Christmas season traditions ==
There are various regional Christmas season traditions. In Alvarado and Tlacotalpan, there is the Fiesta Negrohispana, which is a celebration of African identity in Mexico which runs from December 16 to the 24th.

In Oaxaca, a major event is the feast day of the patroness of the state, the Virgin of Solitude, on December 18. She is honored with precessions called calendas, with allegorical floats and costumes. The traditional food for this is called buñuelos, a fried pastry covered in sugar. In coastal areas, her image is often brought to shore by boat, accompanied by other boats with brass bands.

In the city of Oaxaca, on December 23, there is a unique event called La Noche de los Rabanos (Night of the Radishes). Oversized radishes are carved into elaborate figures. Originally, these were for nativity scenes but today there is a major competition in which the vegetables are carved in all kinds of figures.

In the Xochimilco borough of Mexico City, January 6 is important as the day that the best known Child Jesus image, the Niñopa, changes "hosts" or the family that will take care of the over 400-year-old image for the year. In the Nativitas section of the borough, there is a parade of the Wise Men, sometimes with real camels.

== See also ==
- Culture of Mexico
- Religion in Mexico
- Public holidays in Mexico
- Mexican Christmas dishes
