= Canadian Christmas Tree Growers Association =

Trade group for Christmas tree farmers in Canada founded in 1972

The Canadian Christmas Tree Growers Association (CCTGA) is a trade group for Christmas tree farmers in Canada. It was founded in 1972 and describes itself as an umbrella organization for the various provincial tree growers associations.

== History ==
The Canadian Christmas Tree Growers Association was founded in 1972 with Richard Lord as its first president. In Lord's view it was a forest products trade dispute with the United States in 1986 that brought the CCTGA "into its own". Twice the organization has run a donated Christmas tree program. Initiatives by the CCTGA in both 2007 and 2008 donated thousands of Christmas trees to the families of members of the armed forces serving in Afghanistan over the holiday season. The 2008 "Trees for Troops" program garnered mention in a speech by Canadian Prime Minister Stephen Harper in Petawawa, Ontario on December 5.

== Description ==
The CCTGA describes itself as the "umbrella organization" of the various provincial Christmas Tree Growers Associations in Canada. There are provincial associations in British Columbia, New Brunswick, Nova Scotia, Ontario, Quebec, and a prairie association with both Saskatchewan and Alberta members.
