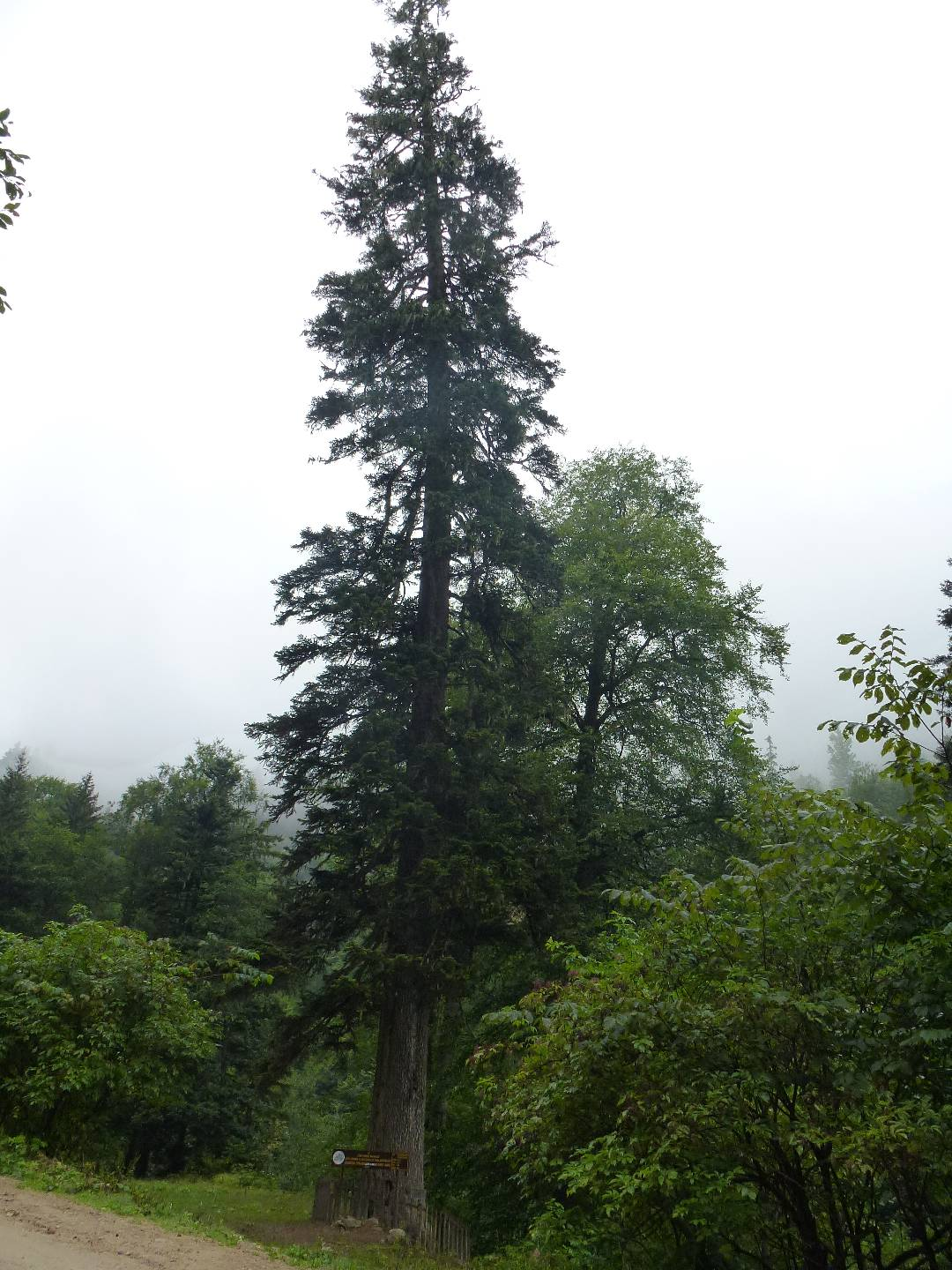
- Caucasian Fir Nature Monument in Türkiye Spider Forest

Conservation status
- Least Concern (IUCN 3.1)

Scientific classification
- Kingdom: Plantae
- Clade: Tracheophytes
- Clade: Gymnosperms
- Division: Pinophyta
- Class: Pinopsida
- Order: Pinales
- Family: Pinaceae
- Genus: Abies
- Species: A. nordmanniana

Binomial name
- Abies nordmanniana (Steven) Spach
- Native range, subsp. nordmanniana Native range, subsp. equi-trojani

Synonyms
- Picea nordmanniana (Steven) Loudon; Pinus abies var. nordmanniana (Steven) F.Muell.; Pinus nordmanniana Steven (1838) (basionym)

= Abies nordmanniana =

Caucasian fir

Species of conifer tree

Abies nordmanniana, the Nordmann fir or Caucasian fir, is a fir indigenous to the mountains south and east of the Black Sea, in Turkey, Georgia and the Russian Caucasus. It occurs at elevations of 900–2,200 m on mountains with precipitation of over 1,000 mm.

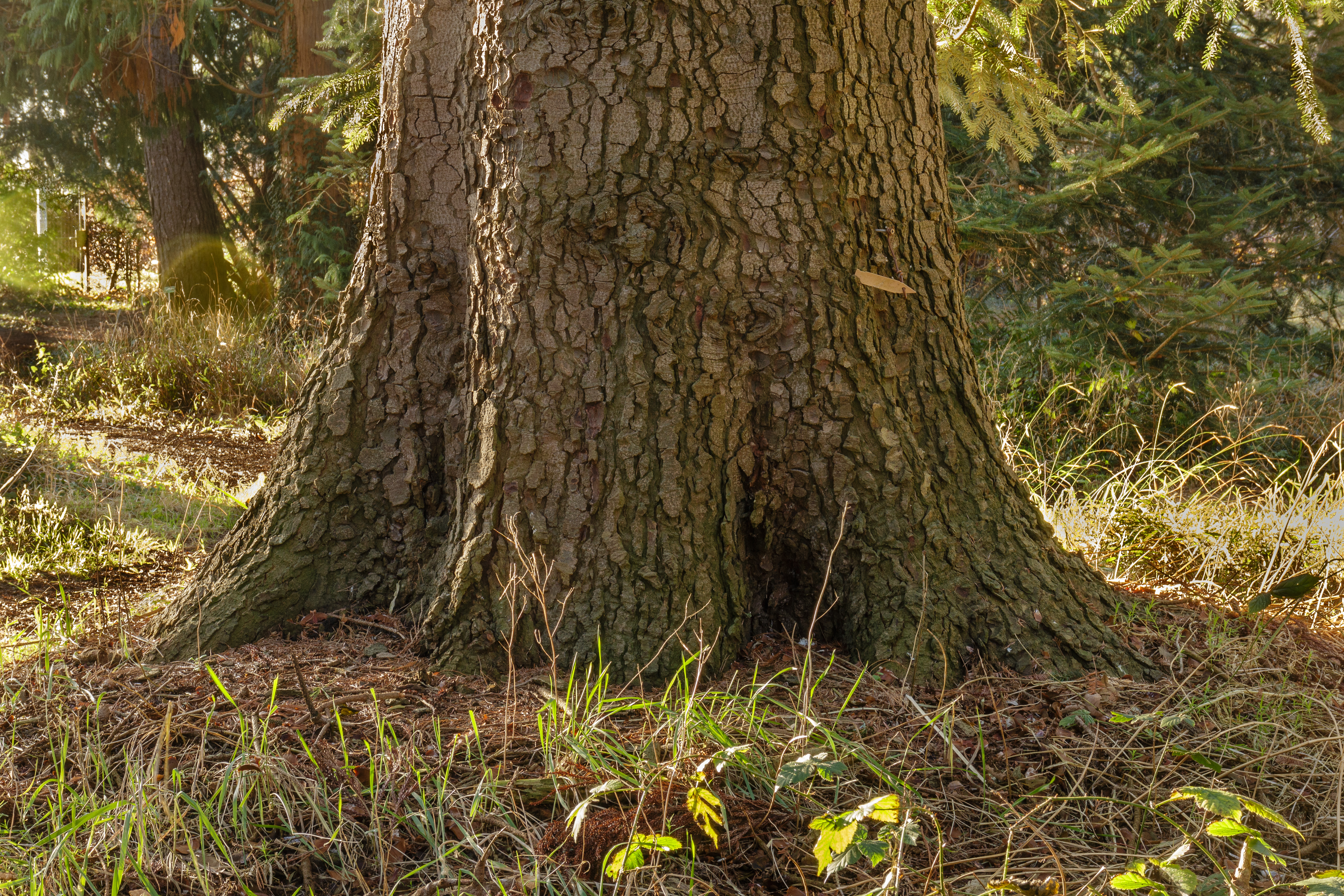
Typical rootstock of a Abies nordmanniana. (Nordmann fir.)

== Description ==
It is a large evergreen coniferous tree growing to 55–61 m tall and with a trunk diameter of up to 2 m. In the Western Caucasus Reserve, some specimens have been reported to be 78 m (256 ft) and even 85 m (279 ft) tall, the tallest trees in the Caucasus, Anatolia, the Russian Federation and the continent of Europe.

The leaves are needle-like, flattened, 1.8–3.5 cm long and 2 mm wide by 0.5 mm thick, glossy dark green above, and with two blue-white bands of stomata below. The tip of the leaf is usually blunt, often slightly notched at the tip, but can be pointed, particularly on strong-growing shoots on young trees. The cones are 10–20 cm long and 4–5 cm broad, with about 150–200 scales, each scale with an exserted bract and two winged seeds; they disintegrate when mature to release the seeds.

== Taxonomy ==
The species is named by Christian von Steven after his compatriot, the Finnish zoologist Alexander von Nordmann (1803–1866), who was the director of the Odessa Botanical Gardens.

=== Subspecies ===
There are two subspecies (treated as distinct species by some botanists), intergrading where they meet in northern Turkey at about 36°E longitude:

- Caucasian fir (Abies nordmanniana subsp. nordmanniana). Native to the Caucasus mountains and eastern Pontic Mountains of northeastern Turkey west to about 36°E. Shoots often pubescent (hairy).
- Turkish fir (Abies nordmanniana subsp. equi-trojani). Native to northwestern Turkey, including the western Pontic Mountains as well as Uludağ and other mountains southeast of the Sea of Marmara. Often treated as a separate species, Abies bornmuelleriana. In Turkey this subspecies is treated as a distinct species (Abies equi-trojani Asch. & Sint. ex Bois.). It is endemic to a single location on Kaz Dağı (Mount Ida) in Balıkesir Province, northwestern Turkey. This subspecies occupies an area of only 164 km^{2} and is assessed as "Endangered". Its shoots are usually glabrous (hairless).

== Distribution and habitat ==
The species is indigenous to the mountains south and east of the Black Sea, in Turkey, Georgia and the Russian Caucasus. It occurs at elevations of 900–2,200 m on mountains with precipitation of over 1,000 mm.

Its current distribution is associated with the forest refugia that existed during the Ice Age at the eastern and southern Black Sea coast. In spite of currently suitable climate, the species is not found in areas of the Eastern Greater Caucasus, which are separated from the Black Sea Coast by more than 400–500 km.

== Cultivation and uses ==
The Nordmann fir is one of the most important species grown for Christmas trees, being favoured for its attractive foliage, with needles that are not sharp and do not drop readily when the tree dries out.

It is also a popular ornamental tree in parks and large gardens, and along with the cultivar 'Golden Spreader' has gained the Royal Horticultural Society's Award of Garden Merit.

In Europe, the tree has also been used for reforestation as a way to mitigate expected forest decline caused by climate changes.

The wood is soft and white, and is used for general construction, paper, etc.

== Gallery ==
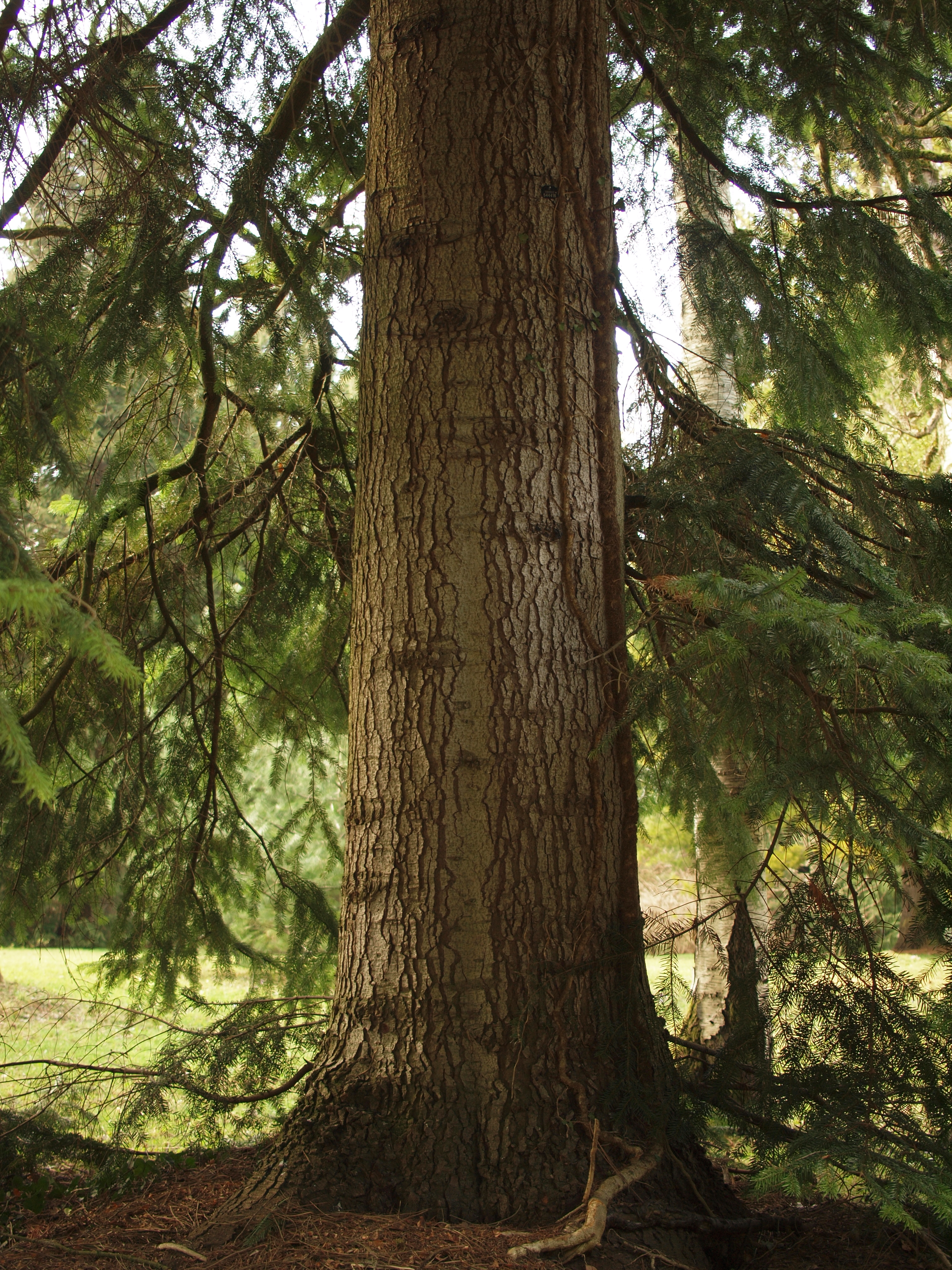
Bark and trunk in Munich botanical garden

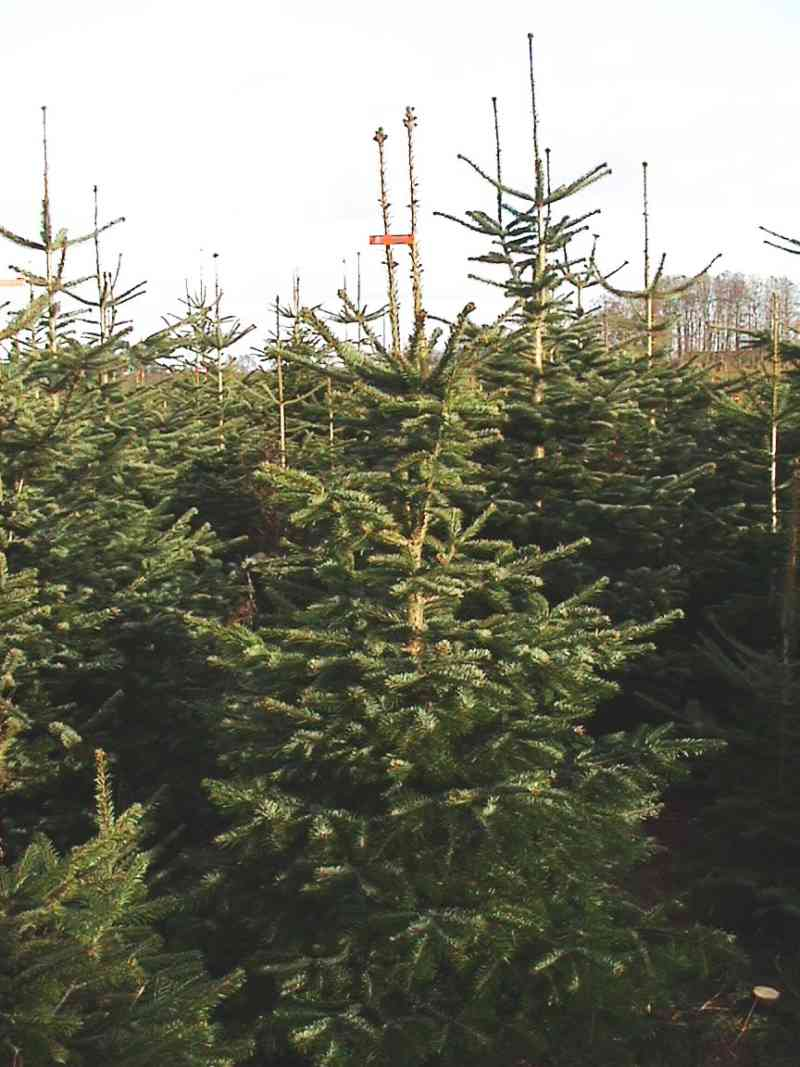
Christmas tree production

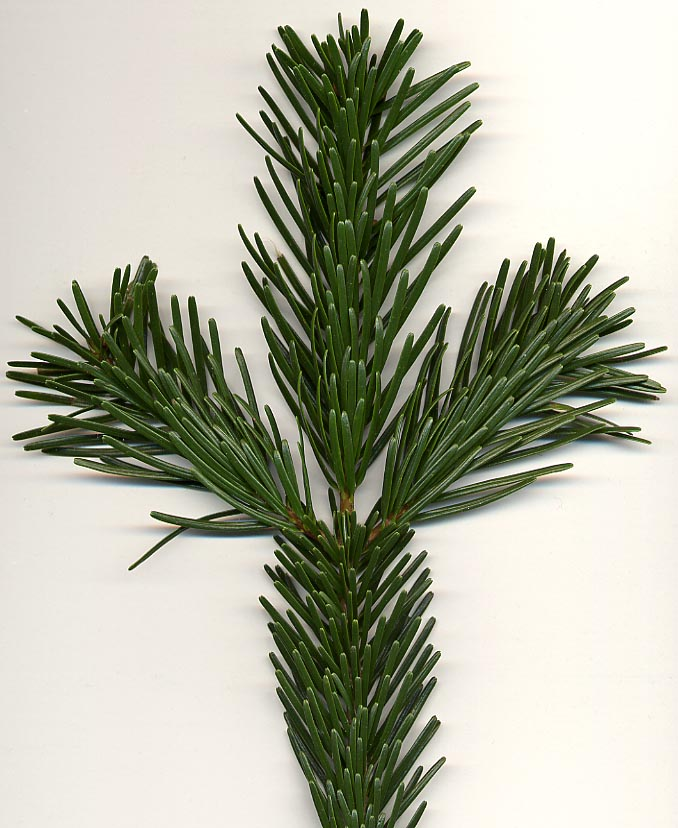
Foliage

Cross-section of needle leaf
