= Christmas tree production =

Production of Christmas trees

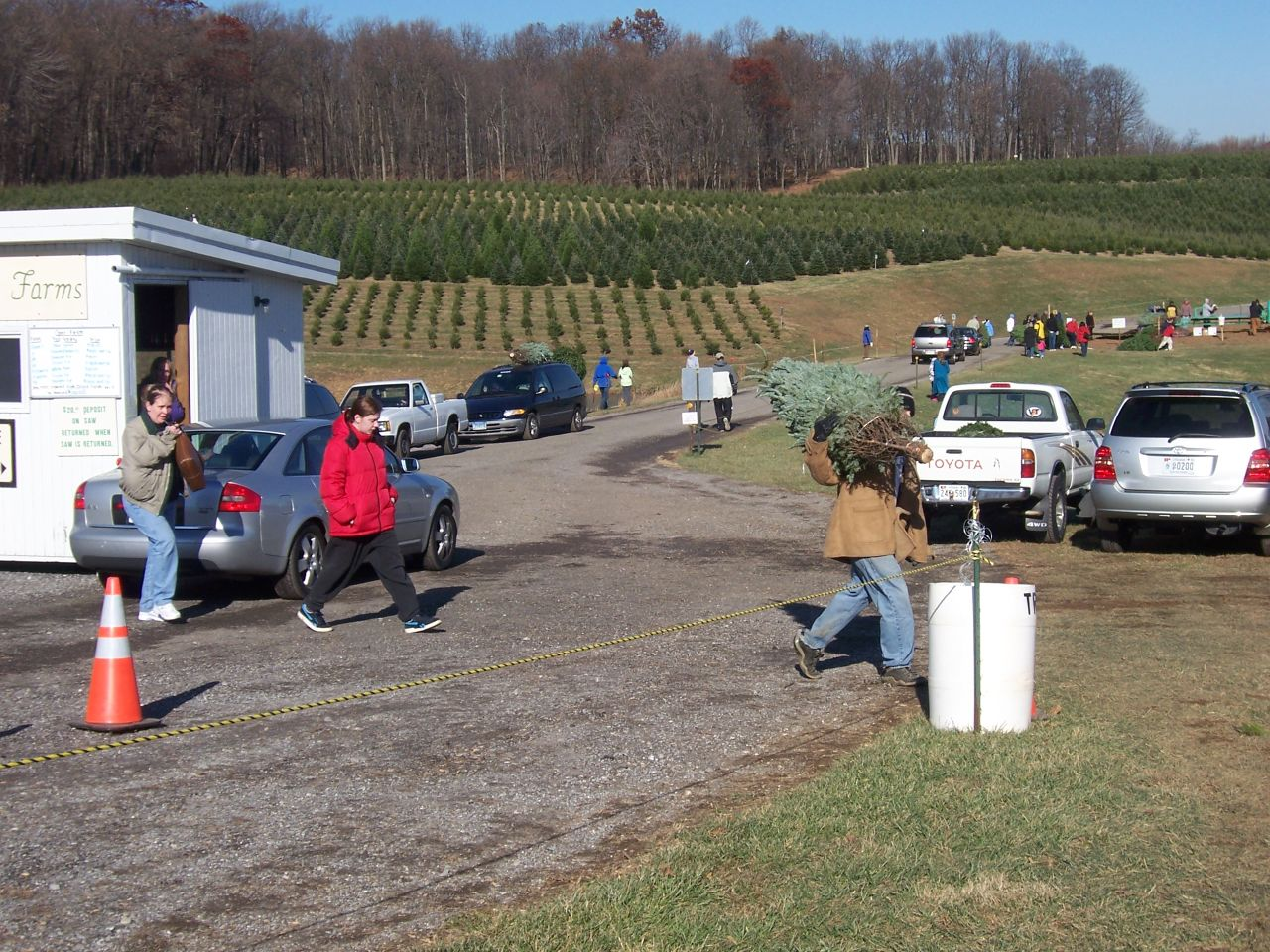
Customers haul a harvested Christmas tree at a "choose-and-cut" Christmas tree farm in the U.S. state of Maryland.

Christmas tree production occurs worldwide on Christmas tree farms, in artificial tree factories and from native strands of pine and fir trees. Christmas trees, pine and fir trees purposely grown for use as a Christmas tree, are grown on plantations in many western nations, including Australia, the United Kingdom and the United States. In Australia, the industry is relatively new, and nations such as the United States, Germany and Canada are among world leaders in annual production.

Great Britain consumes about 8 million trees annually, while in the United States between 35 and 40 million trees are sold during the Christmas season. Artificial Christmas trees are mostly produced in the Pearl River delta area of China. Christmas tree prices were described using a Hotelling-Faustmann model in 2001, the study showed that Christmas tree prices declined with age and demonstrated why more farmers do not price their trees by the foot. In 1993, economists made the first known demand elasticity estimates for the natural Christmas tree market.

== Natural tree production ==
=== Australia ===
Christmas tree farming is a relatively new agricultural pursuit in Australia with the industry only sprouting up within the early 21st century. There are a number of differences in Christmas tree production in Australia when compared with nations in the Northern Hemisphere. The growing season differs because harvest is during a different time of year, this means that lessons learned about farming in the United States and Europe are more difficult to apply to Australia. The seasonal difference also affects the pruning and shearing schedule for the crop. The other primary difference in Australian Christmas tree farming is found in the type of tree grown, Pinus radiata, which is no longer commonly grown for Christmas trees in the United States and Europe, is popular in Australia.

=== Europe ===
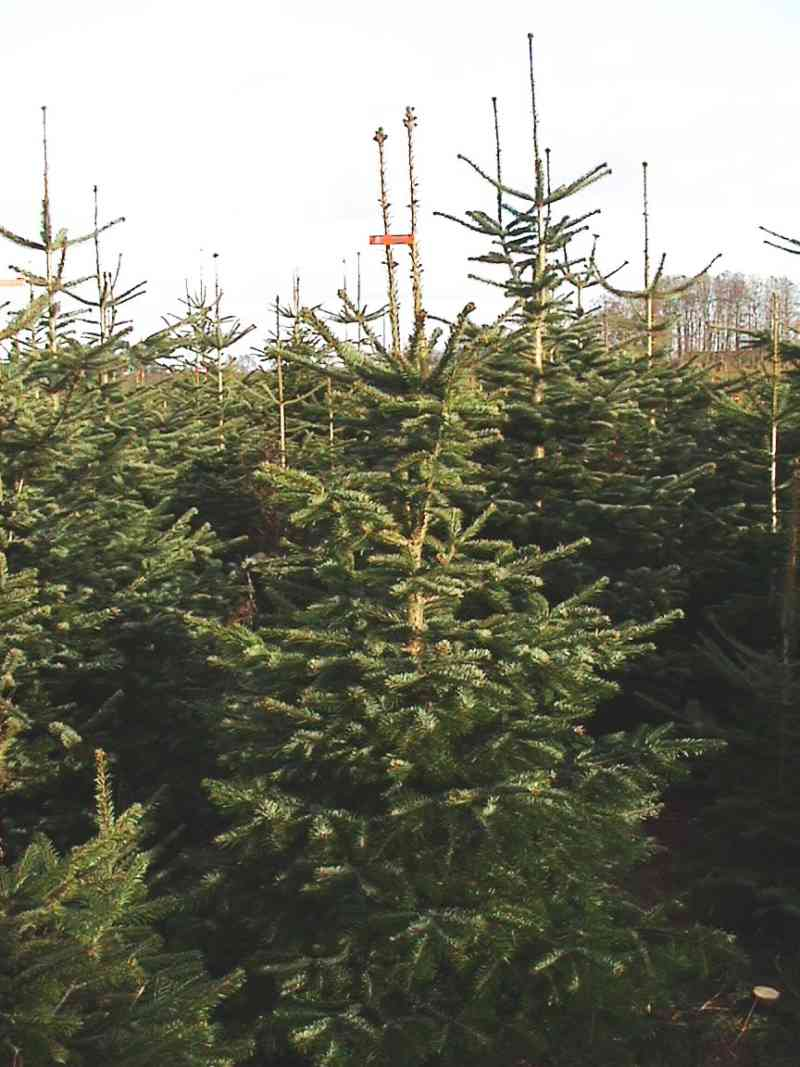
Nordmann fir trees on a Christmas tree farm in Europe

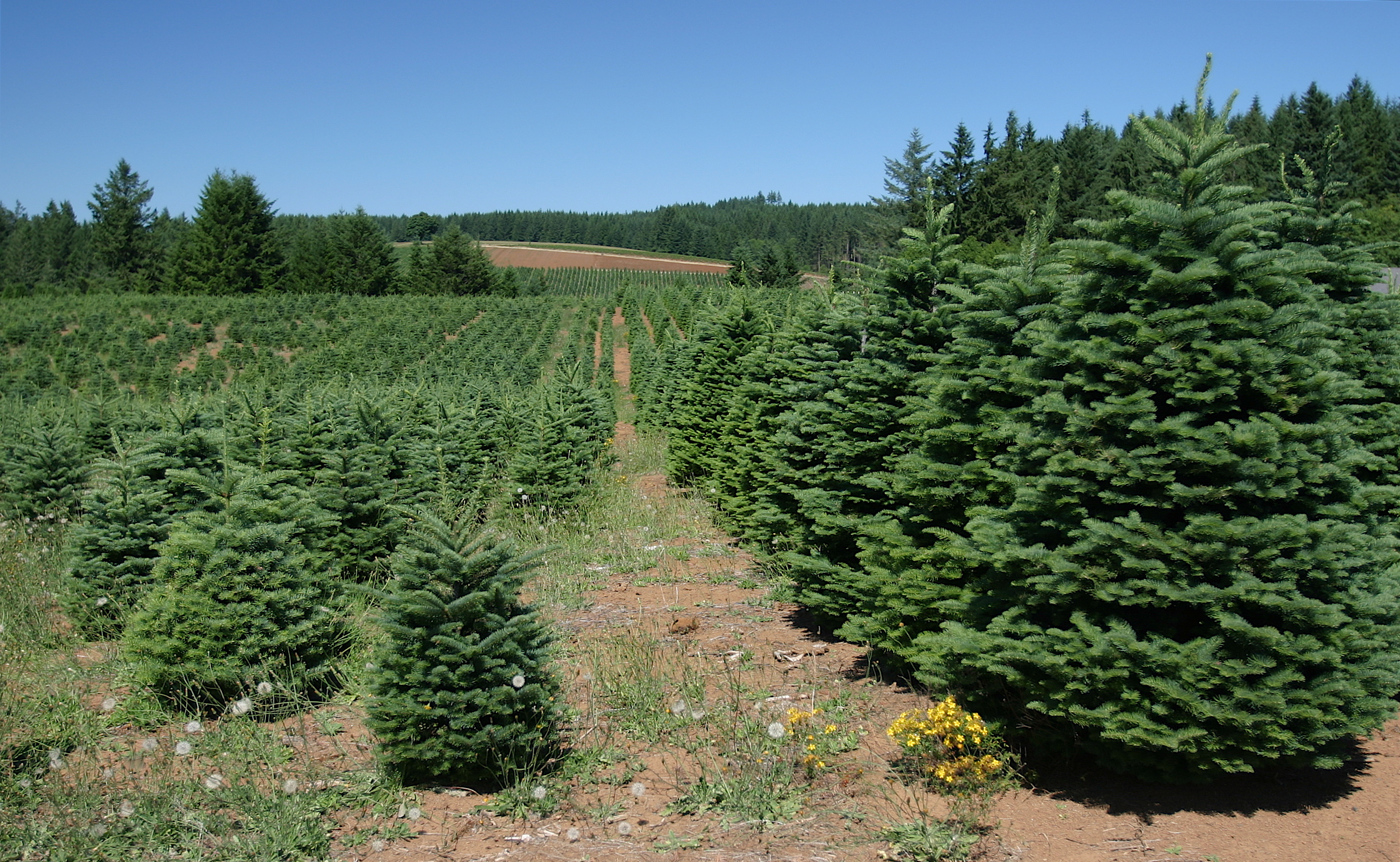
A Christmas tree farm in the U.S. state of Oregon. Oregon had more area devoted to the crop than any other U.S. state in 2002.

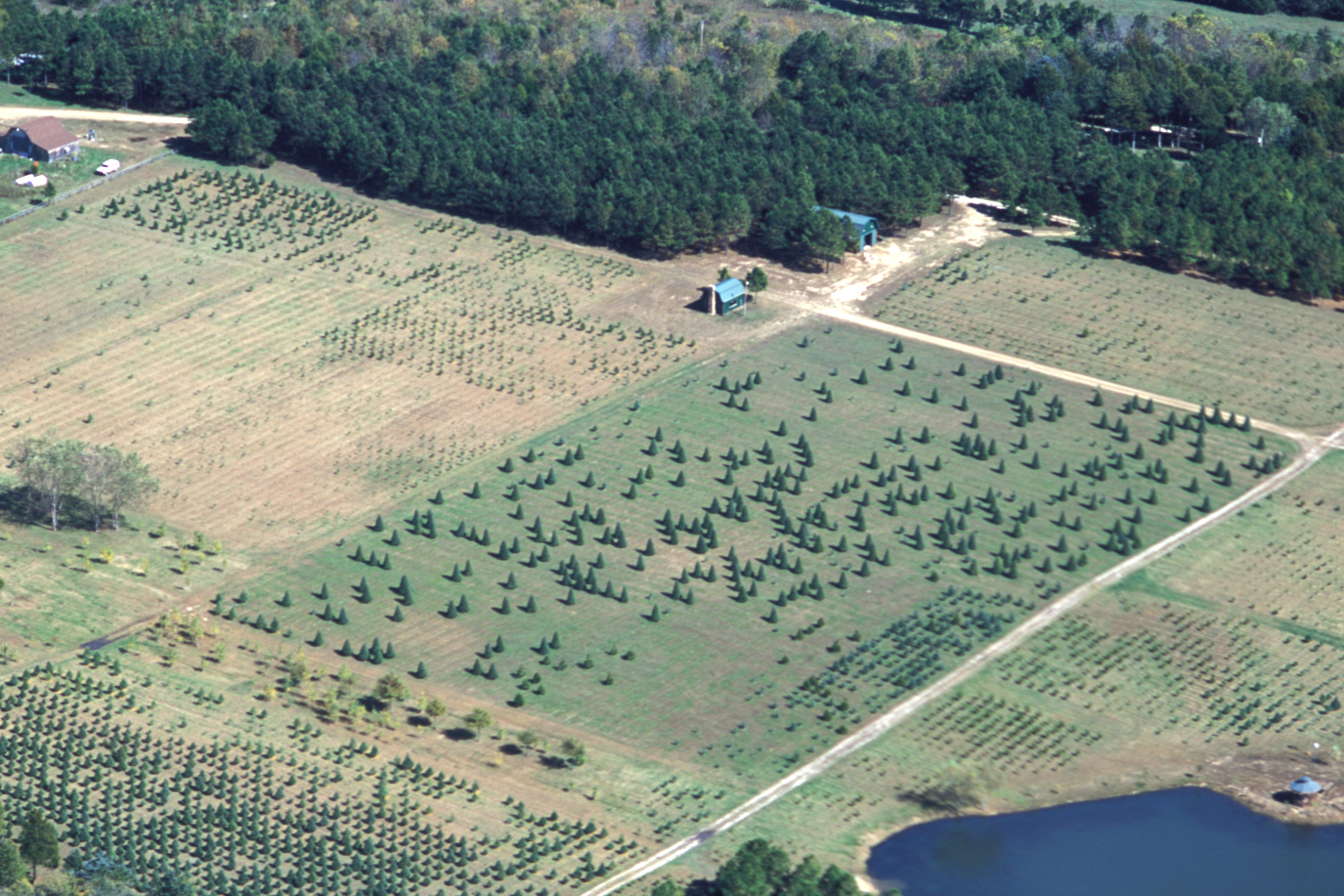
An aerial view of a Christmas tree farm in the U.S. state of Missouri

The European demand for live trees reaches about 50 million per year, compared with the demand for about 35 million of the trees in the United States. Denmark is a major producer of live Christmas trees, about 90 percent are exported to other European nations, such as Great Britain, France, Germany and Austria. Denmark exported about 1 million trees to Great Britain in 2004. 2005 Christmas tree sales in Denmark was about kr1.2 billion (US$204 million, €160 million), of this amount kr1.1 billion was in exports.

The leading European producers of natural Christmas trees are found in central and western Europe. 2018 estimates indicated that Germany produced 18 million Christmas trees annually, followed by France's 6 million trees, Denmark's 10 million trees, Belgium's 5.2 million trees, and Great Britain's 4.4 million Christmas trees produced.

The seeds used to grow Christmas trees in most European countries are harvested in Georgia (90%). The working conditions of seed pickers in a largely unregulated industry has been highlighted as a concern to the main companies buying seeds for cultivation in Denmark. Ultimately the growing of Christmas trees that end up in the majority of homes across Europe have been produced by workers in conditions protected by European law. However, the seeds harvested in Georgia to produce those trees are collected by workers in very poor conditions.

=== North America ===
There are more than 20,000 North American Christmas tree growers, 95 percent of the trees they produce are sold or shipped directly from the farms. On each of the 1 million acres (4,000 km^{2}) planted in Christmas trees annually there are usually about 2,000 trees, the number of trees that survive to harvest varies from 750–1,500 depending upon location. Christmas trees take an average of 6 to 10 years (from transplant) to mature for harvest and each year 73 million new Christmas trees are planted.

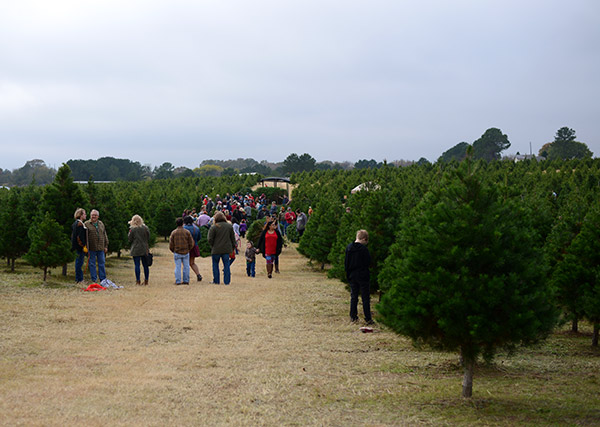
Families search for a Christmas Tree at a farm in Texas.

There are 3 major growing regions in North America: the Pacific northwest, the northeast region of Canada and United States, and the Appalachians region of North Carolina and surrounding states. North American exports are commonly the highest quality in foreign markets.

In 2002, in the United States, 21,904 Christmas tree farms covering 447,000 acres (1,809 km^{2}) of cropland accounted for the 20.8 million Christmas trees cut. Of those farms, 686 harvested 100 acres (0.4 km^{2}) or more, which accounted for over 196,000 acres (793 km^{2}) of the total area of trees harvested. That same year, there were only three U.S. Christmas tree farms with more than 10,000 acres (40 km^{2}) of cropland in production. The total U.S. crop in 2004 was valued at $506 million with $143 million attributed to the nation's leading producer in 2004, Oregon. Oregon was followed in production numbers by North Carolina, Washington, and Michigan. In 2012, 24 million trees were sold at a retail value of over $1 billion.

Trees are grown across the United States in varying conditions, Christmas trees are grown in all 50 U.S. states including Alaska and Hawaii. Other states produced smaller number of trees. For example, in the U.S. state of Alabama there are almost 100 Christmas tree farms which average 800 trees annually. Ninety percent of Alabama's tree farms are "choose and cut" type operations which allow customers to visit and cut their own live Christmas tree. Pennsylvania was home to the most American Christmas tree farms in 2002; the state boasted 2,164 farms. Oregon, however, had the most land devoted to the crop with 67,800 acres (274 km^{2}) being used for Christmas tree farming. Between 2002 and 2012 the production of Christmas trees had declined by over 60% in several US states including Kentucky, Montana, Louisiana, Minnesota, and even Wisconsin, whom harvested 994,594 less trees in 2012.

Of the 40 million live Christmas trees sold in North America each year about 5 to 6 million are grown in Canada. In Ontario, the markets are mainly dominated by sales of the Scots pine, and the White Spruce.

During the 1970s and 1980s domestic production of natural Christmas trees was done through natural forests, a shift began in the 1980s and, especially, the 1990s toward plantations and nurseries. For the years 2009 and 2010 around 800,000 Christmas trees were grown in Mexico on 5000 hectares of land. The USDA reported in 2011 that the majority of Christmas tree production in Mexico took place in the State of Mexico, 60 percent. However, tree production still took place in Nuevo León, Veracruz, as well as the states of Mexico City, Puebla, Jalisco, and Guanajuato.

== Artificial tree production ==
Most artificial Christmas trees are made of 100% recycled plastics from used PVC packaging materials in China. Promoters of artificial trees highlight them as convenient, reusable, and of better quality than artificial trees of the past. Supporters also note that some apartment buildings have banned natural trees because of fire concerns.

There is also a robust market for artificial Christmas trees in Poland. An estimated 20 percent of all Christmas trees sold in Poland are artificial, and many are made domestically by individual families. One producer from Koziegłówki stated that every other house was an artificial tree producer. The trees are made from a special film which is imported from China or Thailand. Entire families take part in production and the trees are sold throughout Poland with some being exported to the Czech Republic and Slovakia.

== Market ==
=== European ===
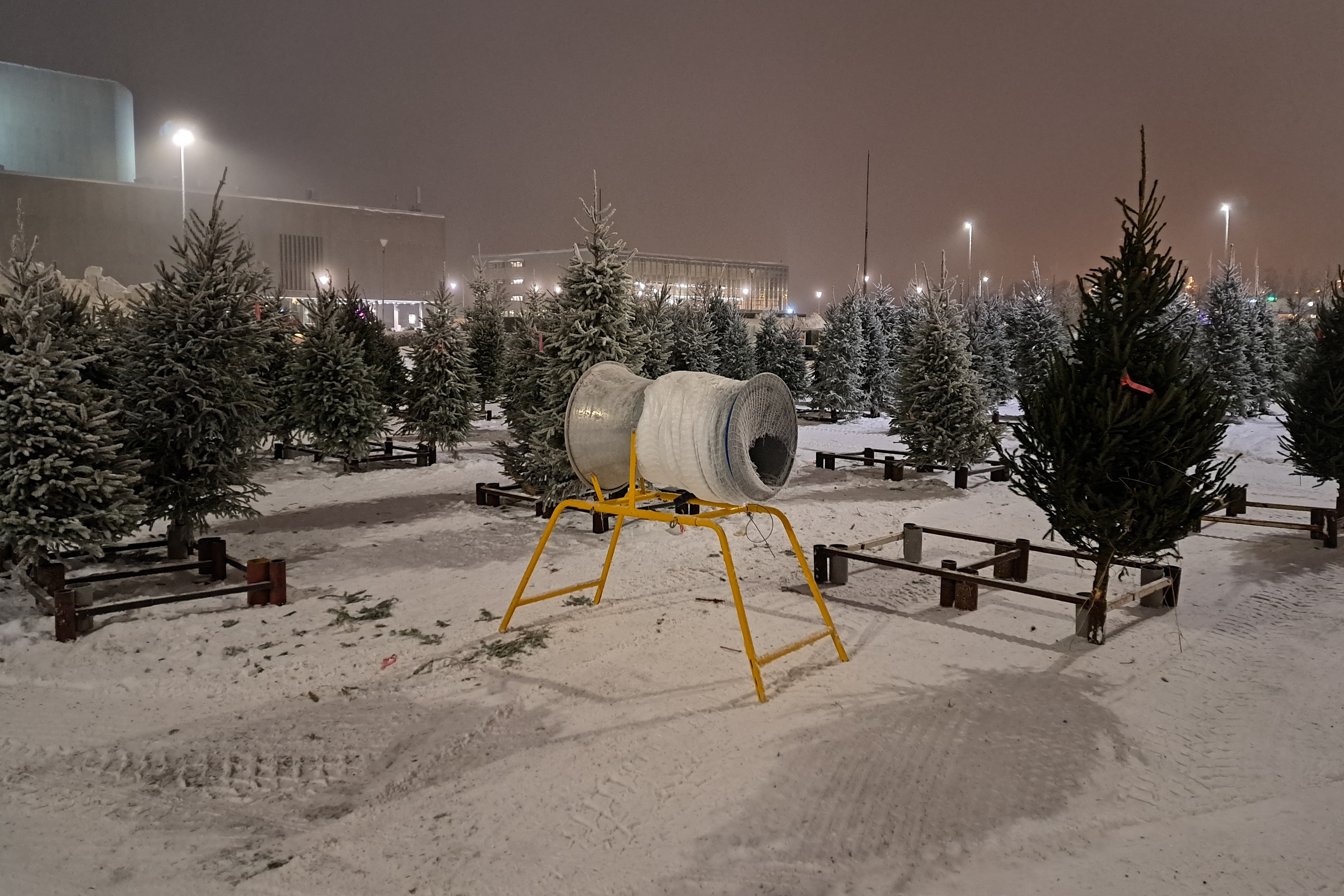
Christmas trees at Oulu Market Square, 2023

British demand for natural Christmas trees is around 8 million annually, with about two-thirds of households opting for artificial trees. When a Danish tree shortage in 2006 resulted in only 200,000 of the usual 1 million Nordmann Fir trees to the British Isles, British farmers were forced to make up the deficit with Norway Spruce, Fraser Fir, and Scots pine. The shortage was a result of a hot summer and a cut in subsidies for growing Christmas trees in Denmark.

Christmas tree consumers in Europe prefer trees with less density and a more open, layered appearance. This is partially because trees are displayed for a relatively short period of time in Europe, and many are lit with candles.

=== North American ===
The market for natural Christmas trees in the United States began to tumble when an oversupply during the late 1980s through the mid-1990s sent prices downward. In 1992, harvests of around 850,000 trees in New England were considered too many and Christmas trees sold for around $5 as opposed to the usual $18–30 each. Natural Christmas tree use continued to decline over the next decade, in part, due to the continued rise in popularity of artificial trees. In U.S. states where a marginal number of trees were grown, many growers were driven out of business.

Over 35 million U.S. households displayed natural Christmas trees in 1990, slightly outpaced by the 36.3 million homes that opted for artificial trees that same year. By 2000, the split was more dramatic with 50.6 million homes using artificial trees while 32 million chose natural Christmas trees. Sales of natural trees continued to slide after 2000, and by 2003 sales of natural trees reached 23.4 million. From 2003 to 2017 sales of natural trees remained flat at 23.4 million annually. During the same period, artificial tree sales rose from 7.3. to 9.6 million annually. Historically, U.S. consumers, much like those in Europe, preferred open, light density trees. Modern U.S. Christmas tree consumers want higher density trees, and begin purchasing trees shortly after Thanksgiving. This requires trees to last longer and be harvested earlier.

Much of Mexico's demand for Christmas trees (around 1.8 million annually) is met through importation. In 2004 the United States enjoyed a 95 percent market share on tree imports. By 2009 the U.S. still imported nearly 1 million trees into Mexico each year, with a small amount coming from production in Canada.

== Profitability ==
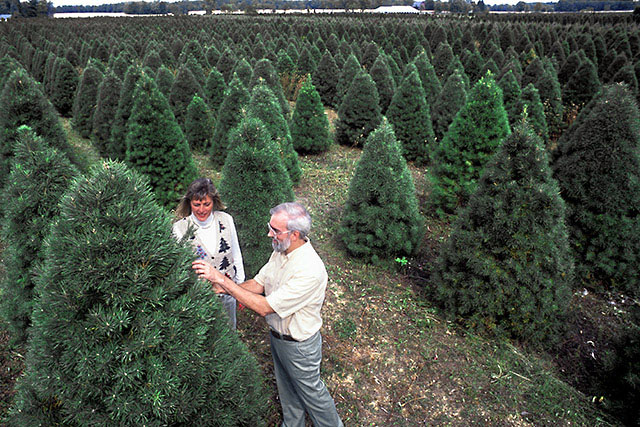
An entomologist checks Scotch pine for pine shoot beetles at a Christmas tree farm near East Lansing, Michigan.

One appeal of Christmas tree farms to growers is that it can be a profitable way to use low quality farmland, though this trend is changing within the industry. Christmas tree farms can turn a profit in as little as six years, and though some overhead in equipment and labor does exist Christmas tree production requires only small amounts of up-front capital. Each tree can cost land owners $5–10 from the time it is planted as a seedling until it is harvested as a mature Christmas tree; that cost includes land costs, and costs accumulated through the growing process. In the early 21st century, Christmas tree farmers typically got annual returns of between $600–1,000 per acre of trees planted.

Christmas tree farming has initial costs associated with establishing the farm. Land, if unowned, must be purchased, as does equipment. Crop failures are also not uncommon which can negate years of work. Besides land, and pests, diseases and bad weather tree farmers must contend with costs associated with tractors and other equipment for planting, harvest and cultivation. Fences, storage buildings, worker protection and pesticide regulations also add to the expenses of Christmas tree farms.

== Economic theory ==
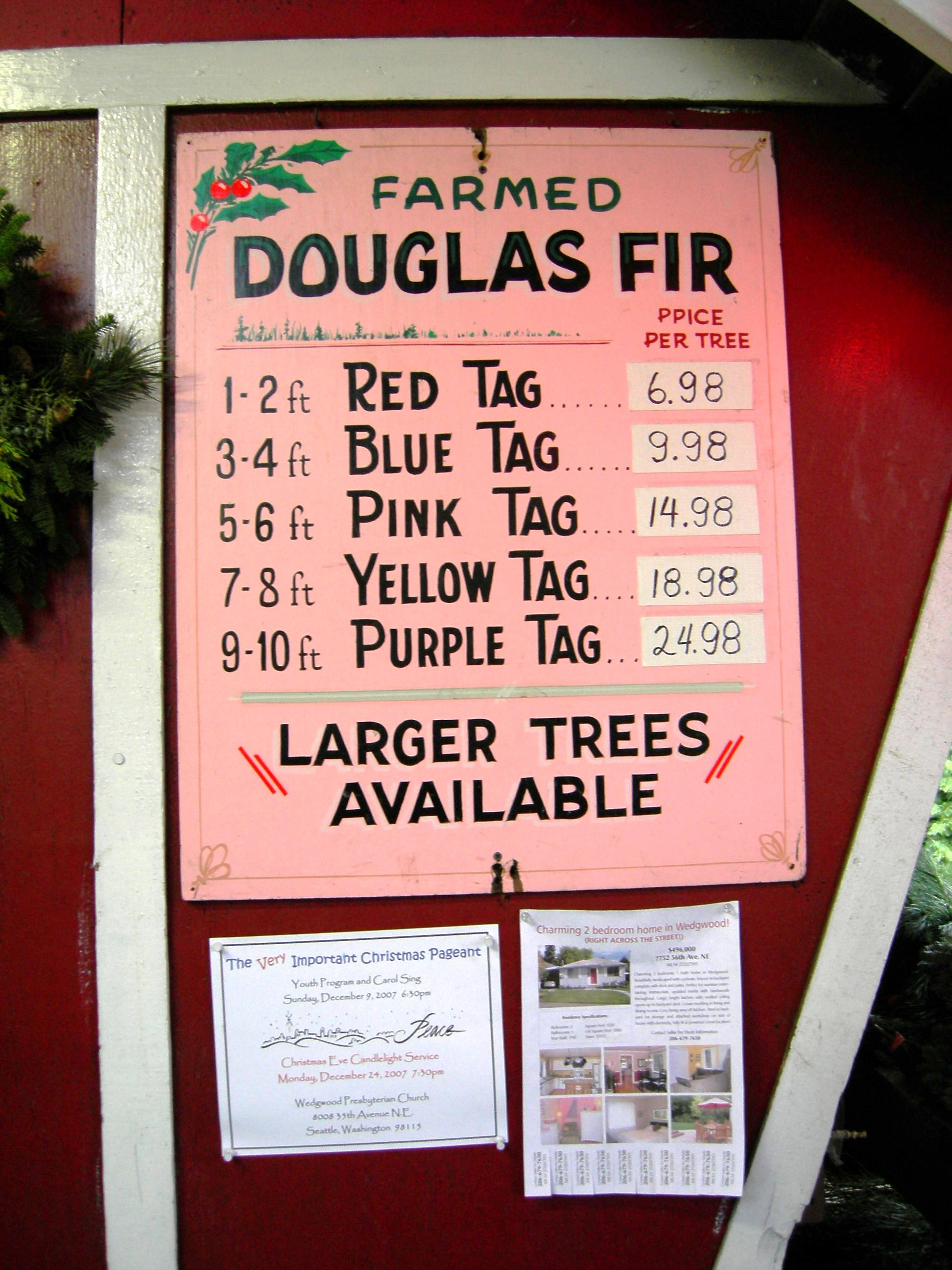
As this sign at a Christmas tree farm in Seattle demonstrates, most tree farmers do not price their trees per foot.

A 2001 study attempted to make predictions about Christmas tree prices and the relationship between tree price and tree age, which corresponds to tree height. The study was based on data obtained from the prices of Christmas trees in North Carolina during December 1997 and used a Hotelling-Faustmann model for its predictions. The results showed, in general, that the change in prices reflected a competitive equilibrium in the capital market, thus support the Hotelling rule. Among the study's results was that, "prices across age cohorts increase at the rate higher than the interest rate." The results also explained the mystery of why Christmas tree merchants do not price trees by the foot. Each foot of an older tree is more valuable than a foot of a younger tree; this is because the percentage increase in price per foot is adversely impacted by the declining growth rate as trees age.

A 1993 paper by George C. Davis and Michael K. Wohlgenant made what was, at the time, the only known estimated demand elasticities for the natural Christmas tree market. Davis and Wohlgenant concluded that the price elasticities for natural Christmas trees with respect to natural tree prices and annualized artificial tree prices were -0.674 and 0.188. The estimates incorporated survey data from 558 households in Washington, D.C., northern Virginia, southern Maryland and Philadelphia about Christmas tree display preferences. Using the results of empirical estimates derived from the survey the elasticity formula was used to arrive at the first known demand elasticity estimates ever completed for the natural Christmas tree market.
