= Christmas tree production in Canada =

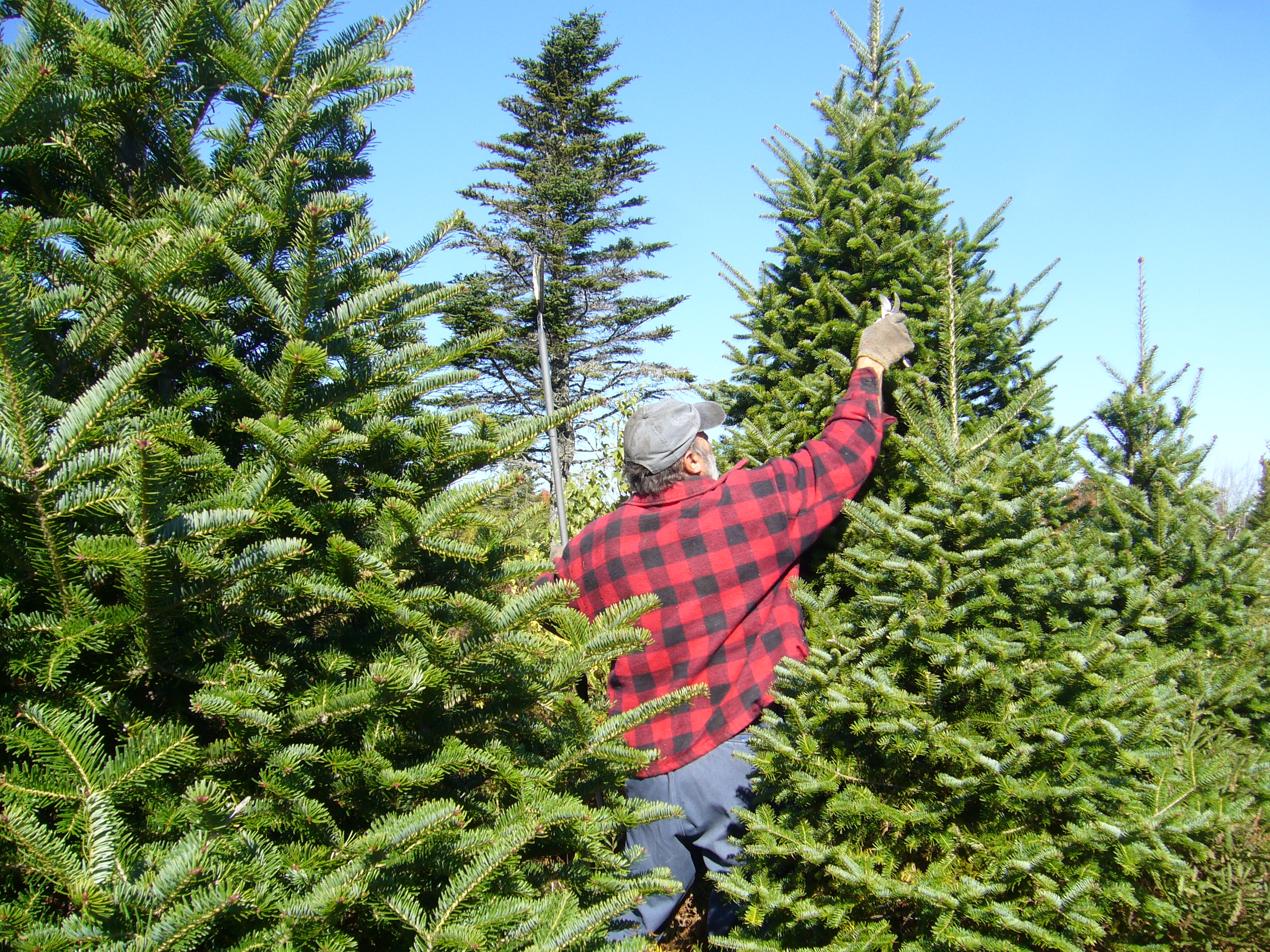
A grower in Waterloo, Nova Scotia prunes Balsam Fir trees in October.

Christmas tree production in Canada totals from 3 to 6 million trees annually. Trees are produced in many of the provinces of Canada but the nation's leading producers are found in Quebec, Nova Scotia and Ontario, which account for 80 percent of Canadian tree production. Of the 900,000 trees produced annually in British Columbia, most are cut from native pine stands.

== Production history ==
The production of natural Christmas trees in Canada developed similarly to that of the United States. Into the 1930s nearly all Canadian Christmas trees were harvested from native stands within local forests. Demand for Christmas trees continued to rise and the interest in Christmas tree cultivation increased with it.

Around 40 million Christmas trees are cut every year in North America; of that number, between 3 and 6 million are cut from Canadian Christmas tree farms and native pine and fir stands annually. The nation's top three producers of Christmas trees, Quebec, Nova Scotia, and Ontario, account for around 80 percent of all Canadian Christmas tree production. About half of the total harvest is exported each year, mostly to the United States but also to the Caribbean, Central America, and Germany.

In 1995, there were about 126,000 acres (510 km^{2}) of land, divided over 4,077 farms, in production with Christmas trees in Canada. Five provinces vied for the title of Canada's top Christmas tree producer, three of which were close to each other in terms of percentage of the total national acreage devoted to the crop. The leading provinces in 1995 were Quebec, Nova Scotia, Ontario, British Columbia and New Brunswick. Quebec, Nova Scotia and Ontario all accounted for 22–24 percent of the total national acreage used by Christmas tree production, and together the five leading provinces accounted for 95 percent of all land in production with the crop nationwide. The 1995 total crop numbered 3.2 million trees cut, Quebec provided 32.5 percent of the total trees harvested.

Nearly a decade later, in 2004, Canadian Christmas tree production was at 3.9 million trees cut, a 0.3 percent decrease over the preceding 10 years. The 2004 crop was worth around $62 million, 36.2 million of which came from the 2.5 million trees Canadians exported. The 2004 Christmas tree harvest represented a 3.3 percent decrease when compared to 2003. Overall, between 2000 and 2010 Canadian tree farmers saw revenue decline 12 percent.

By 2015, the number of farms had fallen to just under 2,400 and the industry was valued at just over $78 million.

== British Columbia ==
Each year about 900,000 Christmas trees are produced in British Columbia (BC), most of these trees are cut from native stands and originate in the East Kootenay region of BC. While 75 percent of the trees produced are harvested from native stands those that are grown on plantations are grown by about 450 individual growers. All British Columbian Christmas tree plantations are found in the Fraser Valley, on Vancouver Island, and in the Okanagan, Thompson and Kootenays regions.

== Nova Scotia ==
The Christmas tree industry in Nova Scotia is worth $30 million per year and involves some 3,500 producers and exporters. The $30 million crop is represented by a harvest of over 1.8 million trees annually, 95 percent of the trees harvested are sold outside the province. The industry provided 500 permanent jobs and seasonal work for 2,500 Nova Scotia workers.

Between the 1996 and 2001 Census of Agriculture the total area devoted to Christmas tree production in Nova Scotia fell 18.1 percent to 23,450 acres (94.9 km^{2}). Production was spread out over 535 farms, one-third less than in 1996. Despite the overall decrease in land area for the crop, Nova Scotia led Canada in terms of land used for Christmas tree cultivation. In 1996, Nova Scotia had ranked second behind Quebec in terms of land area devoted to Christmas trees.

Arguably the most famous Christmas tree produced in Nova Scotia is the Boston Tree, which is donated by the province to the people of Boston in remembrance of the city's response after the infamous Halifax Explosion. Usually, the Boston Tree is cut from an open stand, where trees are allowed to grow uncontrolled, but occasionally it has been donated by a Christmas tree grower.

== Ontario ==
According to 2001 Canadian agriculture statistics the Christmas tree crop in Ontario covered 30,000 acres (120 km^{2}) and was worth a total of $8.3 million.

== Prince Edward Island ==
Prince Edward Island has a small Christmas tree industry; some growers cater to the "u-cut" and local retail trade. The primary species is Balsam Fir with pines and spruce accounting for most of the rest. Many growers plant seedlings on old fields but there is increasing interest in managing balsam fir that establishes itself naturally on many old cutover sites.

In 2009, approximately 80,000 Christmas trees were exported from Prince Edward Island to the United States.

== Quebec ==
Quebec, along with New England and the other provinces of Atlantic Canada, is a primary producer of Balsam Fir trees for use as Christmas trees; the Balsam Fir is one of the most popular species of Christmas tree in North America. Quebec Christmas tree production in 1997 totaled nearly 1.9 million trees, 80 percent of which were exported for sale in the United States and Mexico. The remaining 20 percent of the 1997 crop in Quebec was sold locally.

== Other areas ==
Aside from the main Christmas tree producing provinces of Canada, Christmas trees are grown in smaller numbers in other parts of the county. In 1998, the government of Newfoundland and Labrador instituted a policy aimed at encouraging potential Christmas tree growers to join the fledgling industry. The province imported approximately 17,000 Christmas trees, a $400,000 value, per year, according to 2000 numbers. Between 1998 and 2000 the government held training workshops throughout the province in an attempt to increase the number of local Christmas tree farmers.

The Christmas tree industry in Saskatchewan is small and in the early 21st century was just getting off the ground. The province of Saskatchewan produces about 12,000 Christmas trees per year. The Saskatchewan Christmas Tree Growers Association has 25 members, five of whom reside in Alberta.

== See also ==
- Canadian Christmas Tree Growers Association
