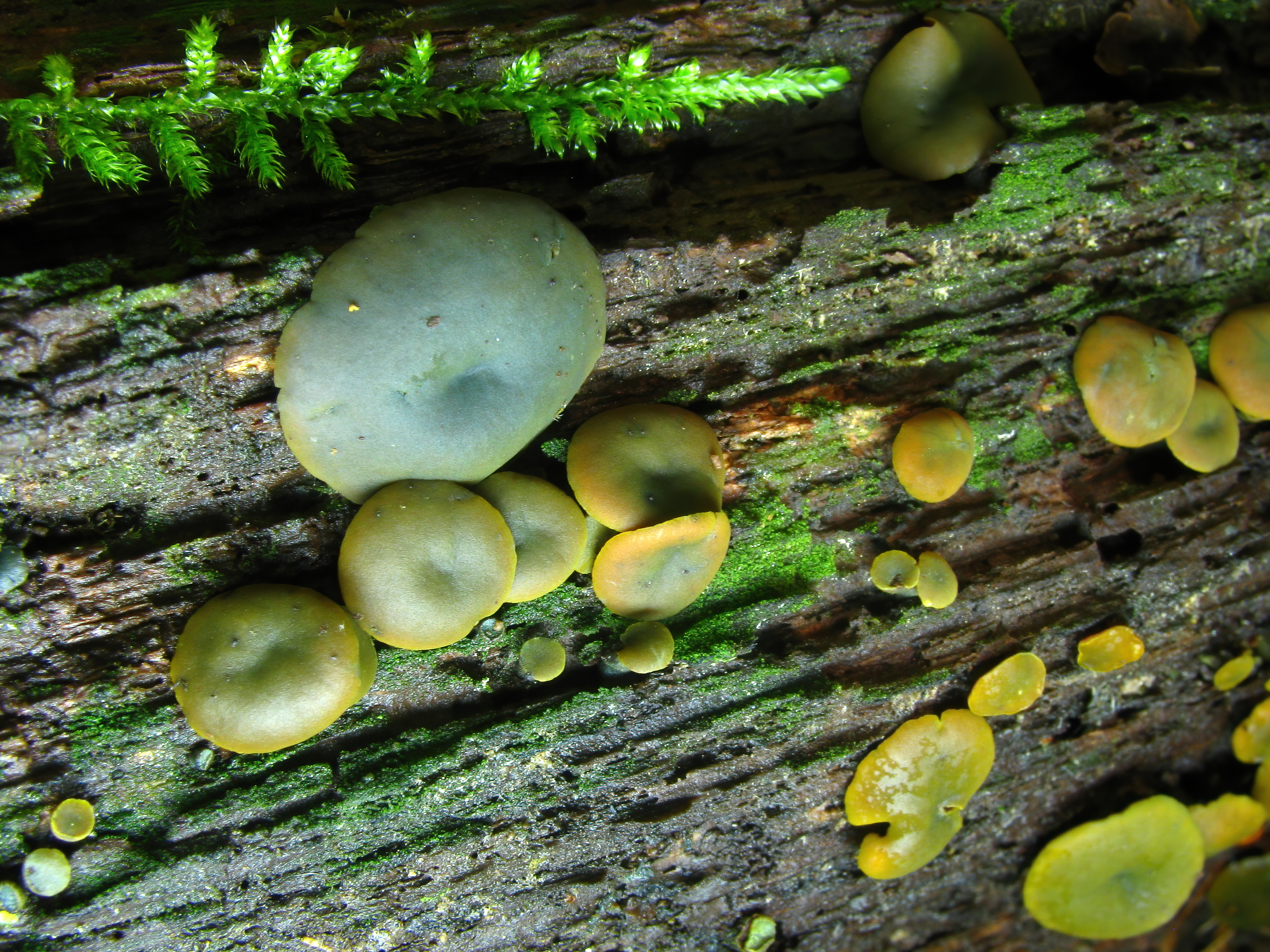

Scientific classification
- Kingdom: Fungi
- Division: Ascomycota
- Class: Leotiomycetes
- Order: Helotiales
- Family: Hemiphacidiaceae
- Genus: Chlorencoelia
- Species: C. versiformis

Binomial name
- Chlorencoelia versiformis (Pers.) J.R.Dixon (1975)

Synonyms
- Peziza versiformis Pers. (1798)

= Chlorencoelia versiformis =

Species of fungus

Chlorencoelia is a species of fungus in the family Hemiphacidiaceae. It was originally described in 1798 by Christian Hendrik Persoon as Peziza versiformis. The species was transferred to Chlorencoelia in 1975.
