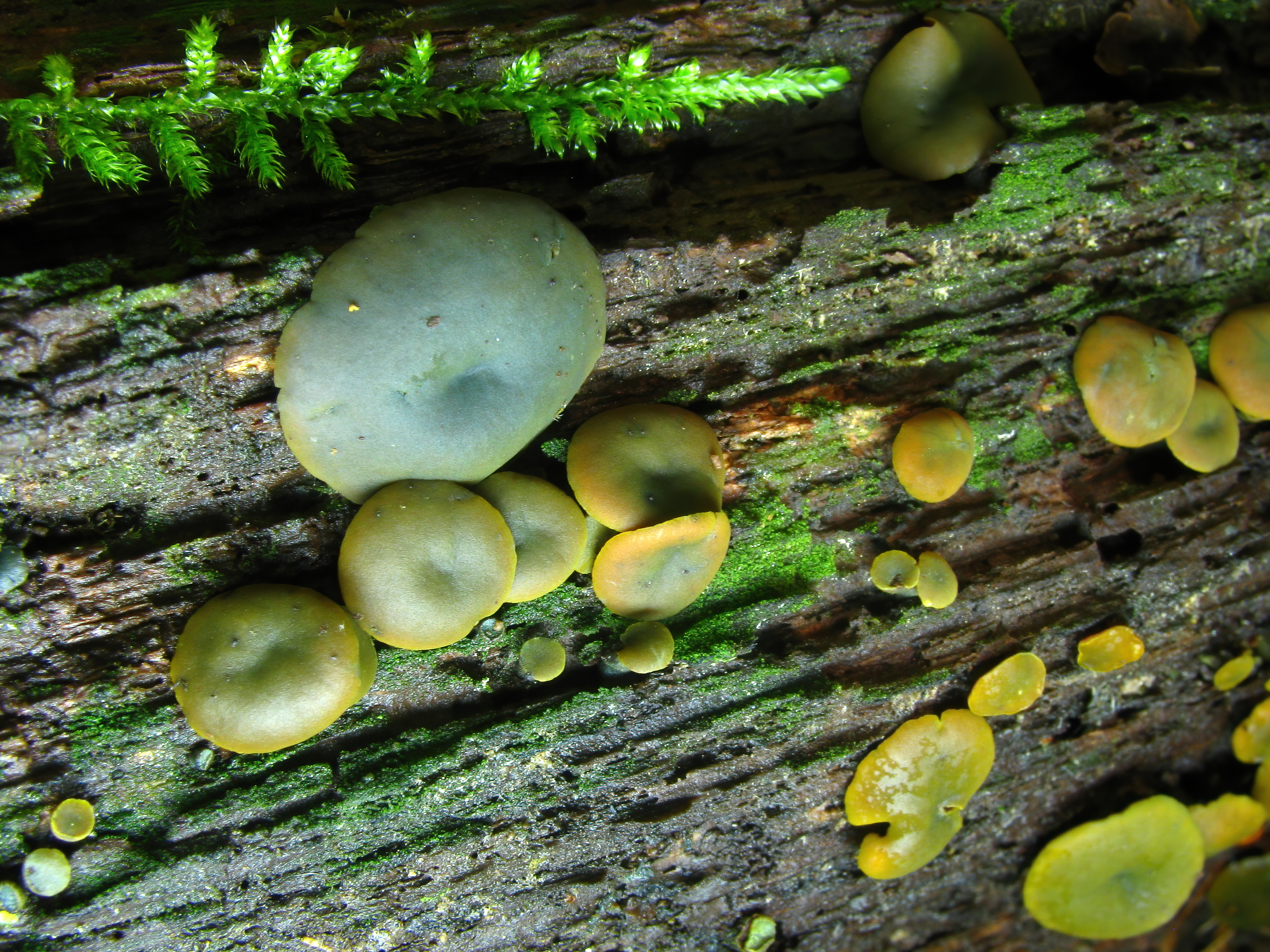
- Chlorencoelia versiformis

Scientific classification
- Kingdom: Fungi
- Division: Ascomycota
- Class: Leotiomycetes
- Order: Helotiales
- Family: Hemiphacidiaceae
- Genus: Chlorencoelia; J.R.Dixon (1975)

Type species
- Chlorencoelia versiformis (Pers.) J.R.Dixon (1975)

Species
- C. indica C. torta C. versiformis

= Chlorencoelia =

Genus of fungi

Chlorencoelia is a genus of fungi in the family Hemiphacidiaceae. The genus, which contains three species, was circumscribed by J.R. Dixon in 1975.
