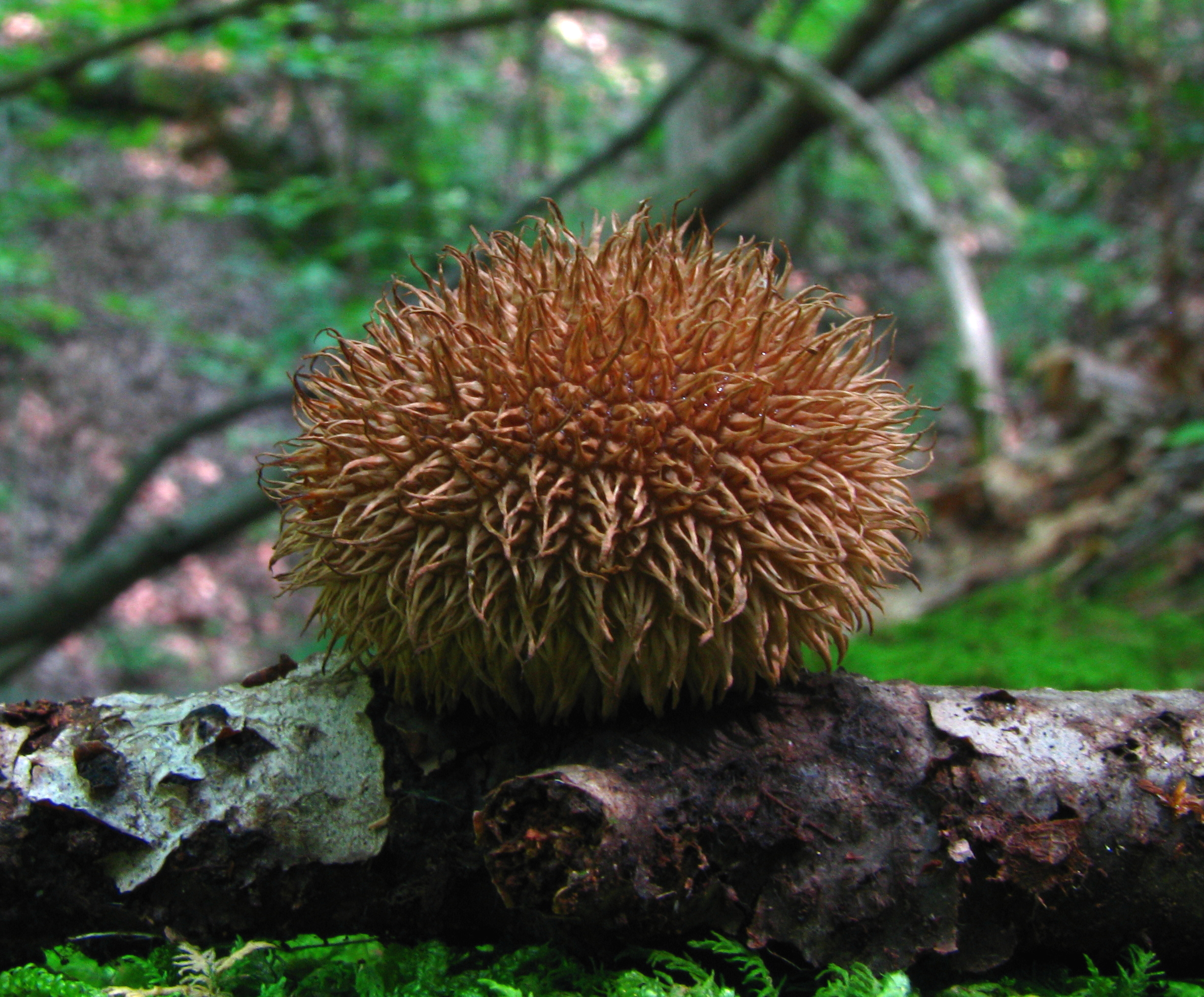
- Mature specimen with brown spines

Scientific classification
- Kingdom: Fungi
- Division: Basidiomycota
- Class: Agaricomycetes
- Order: Agaricales
- Family: Lycoperdaceae
- Genus: Lycoperdon
- Species: L. echinatum

Binomial name
- Lycoperdon echinatum Pers. (1797)

Synonyms
- Lycoperdon gemmatum var. echinatum (Pers.) Fr. (1829); Lycoperdon Hoylei Berk. & Broome (1871); Utraria echinata (Pers.) Quél. (1873); Lycoperdon americanum Demoulin (1972)

= Lycoperdon echinatum =

Species of puffball mushroom

Lycoperdon echinatum
- Mycological characteristics
- Glebal hymenium
- Lacks a stipe
- Spore print is brown
- Ecology is saprotrophic
- Edibility is edible or inedible

Lycoperdon echinatum, commonly known as the spiny puffball or the spring puffball, is a type of puffball mushroom in the family Agaricaceae. The saprobic species has been found in Africa, Europe, Central America, and North America, where it grows on soil in deciduous woods, glades, and pastures. It has been proposed that North American specimens be considered a separate species, Lycoperdon americanum, but this suggestion has not been followed by most authors. Molecular analysis indicates that L. echinatum is closely related to the puffball genus Handkea.

The fruit bodies of L. echinatum are 2–4 cm (0.8–1.6 in) wide by 2–3.5 cm (0.8–1.4 in) tall, supported by a small base, and densely covered with spines that are up to 0.6 cm (0.2 in) long. The spines can fall off in maturity, leaving a net-like pattern of scars on the underlying surface. Initially white in color, the puffballs turn a dark brown as they mature, at the same time changing from nearly round to somewhat flattened. Young specimens of L. echinatum resemble another edible spiny puffball, Lycoperdon pulcherrimum, but the latter species does not turn brown as it ages. The fruit bodies are edible when young, when the interior is white and firm and before it has turned into a powdery brown mass of spores. Laboratory tests have shown that extracts of the fruit bodies can inhibit the growth of several bacteria that are pathogenic to humans.

== Taxonomy and phylogeny ==
The species was first described by Christian Hendrik Persoon in 1797. It was later reduced to a variety of Lycoperdon gemmatum (as L. gemmatum var. echinatum; L. gemmatum is now known as Lycoperdon perlatum) by Elias Magnus Fries, but American mycologist Charles Horton Peck, who extensively studied the North American distribution of the genus, raised it again to species level in 1879. He thought it worthy of status as a species distinct from L. gemmatum because of the different character of its warts, its much spinier appearance, and the smoother surface of the peridium underneath the spines. Miles Joseph Berkeley and Christopher Edmund Broome wrote of the fungus in 1871, but believed their specimen, collected from Reading, Berkshire, by Hoyle, represented a new species, which they called Lycoperdon Hoylei. They wrote that their specimen agreed "exactly with an authentic specimen of Persoon's L. echinatum externally, who could, however, scarcely have overlooked the lilac spores." Despite the apparent difference in spore color, L. Hoylei is currently considered synonymous with L. echinatum. Utraria echinata, named by Lucien Quélet in 1873, is another synonym for L. echinatum.

In 1972, Vincent Demoulin described the species Lycoperdon americanum on the basis of a specimen found in North Carolina. Although he believed it to be a unique species, several authors consider it synonymous with L. echinatum. Phylogenetic analysis of the sequence and secondary structure of the ribosomal RNA (rRNA) genes coding for the internal transcribed spacer units suggests that Lycoperdon echinatum forms a clade with the puffball genus Handkea, separate from the type species of Lycoperdon, Lycoperdon perlatum. In previous analyses that used only the rRNA sequences for phylogenetic comparison, L. echinatum formed a clade with L. mammiforme, L. foetidum, and Bovistella radicata (now known as Lycoperdon radicatum), but separate from L. pyriforme.

The species is commonly known as the "spiny puffball" or the "spring puffball"; Peck referred to the species as the "echinate puff-ball". The specific epithet echinatum is derived from the Greek word echinos (εχινος) meaning "hedgehog" or "sea-urchin".

== Description ==
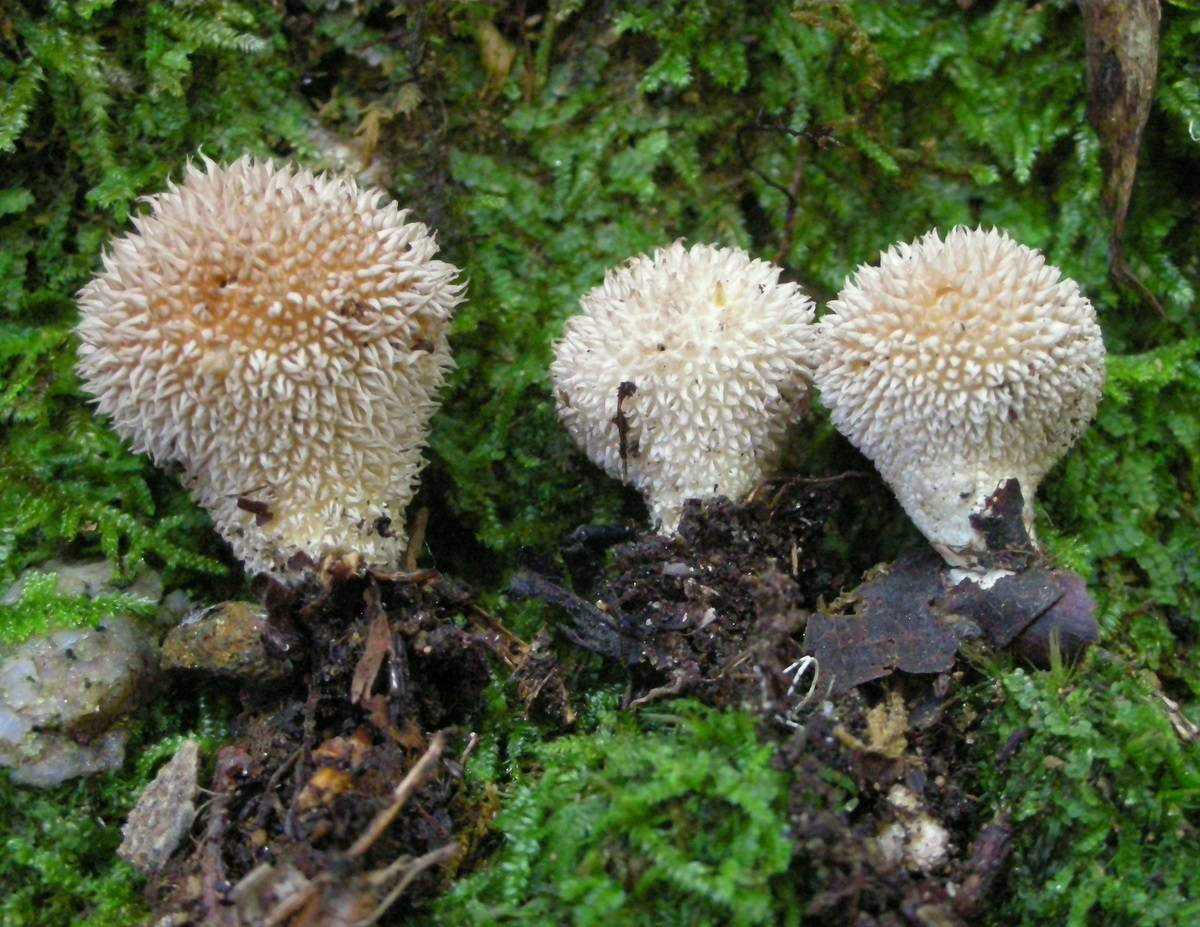

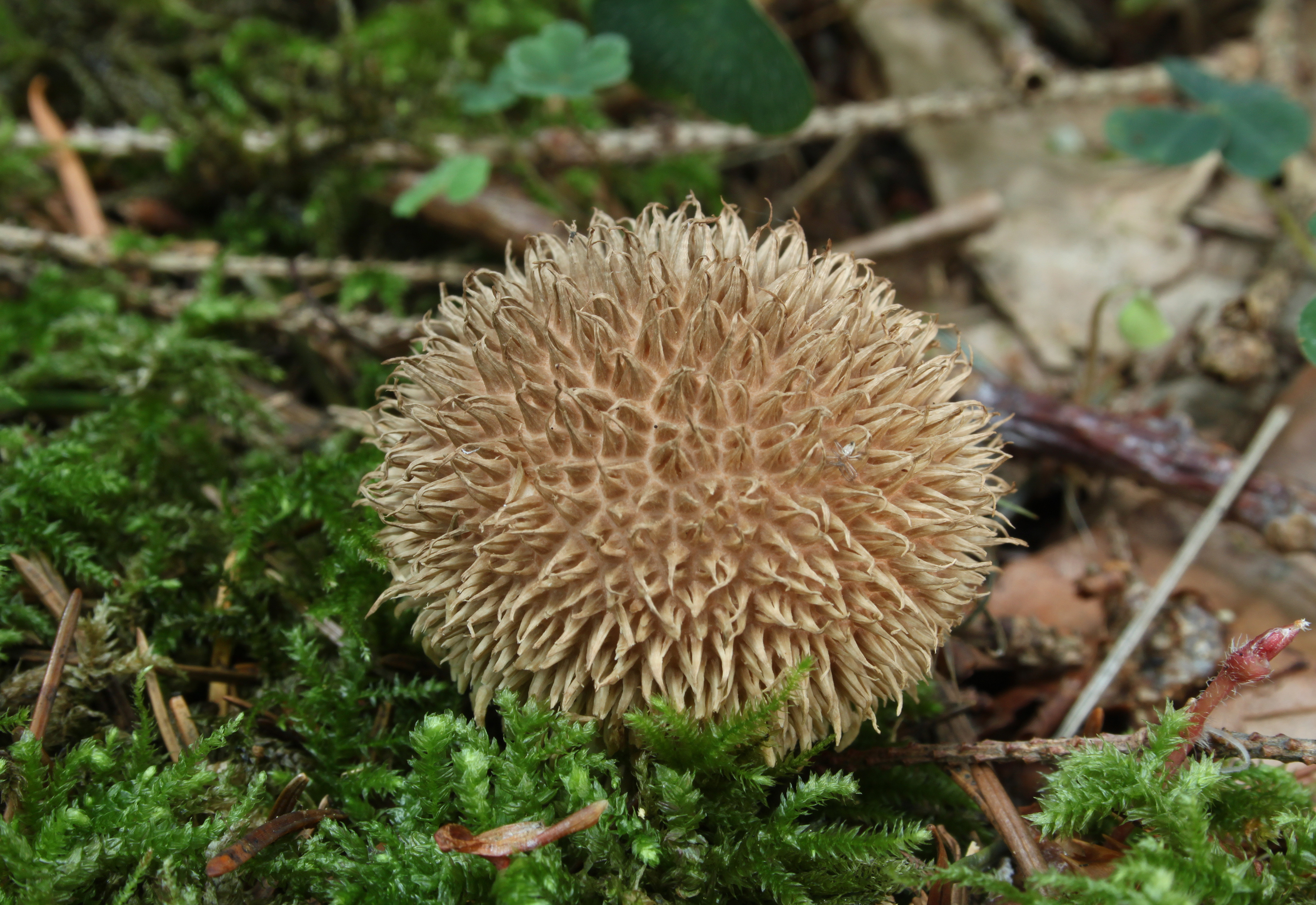
Young specimens (above) are white before turning brown in maturity (below).

The fruit bodies of L. echinatum are 2–4 cm (0.8–1.6 in) wide by 2–3.5 cm (0.8–1.4 in) tall, and are roughly spherical, or pear-shaped. The exterior surface is crowded with spines that may be up to 0.6 cm (0.2 in) long. According to Curtis Gates Lloyd, American specimens have more slender spines than European ones. Initially white and becoming dark brown in maturity, the spines are often joined at the tips in groups of three or four. In this form the puffballs resemble acorn caps of burr oak, with which they may readily be confused. The spines slough off in age, revealing a somewhat net-like or reticulated surface. The fruit body has a small base that is an off-white or purple-gray color, and it may be attached to the growing surface by thin white cords (rhizomorphs). The internal contents of the puffball contain the gleba, a mass of spores and associated spore-producing cells. In young specimens the gleba is white and firm, but as the puffball ages, it turns yellowish and then brown to purple-brown and powdery. Mature specimens develop a pore at the top of the fruit body through which spores are released when hit by falling raindrops.

The spores of L. echinatum, roughly spherical with warts on the surface, have diameters between 4 and 6 μm. The capillitia (coarse thick-walled hyphae in the gleba) are elastic, brown in color, contain small pores, and are 5–8 μm thick. The basidia (the spore-bearing cells) may be attached to two to four spores, and the sterigmata (tapered spine-like projections from the basidia that attach the spores) are up to 5 μm long.

== Edibility ==
Like most other puffball species, L. echinatum is edible when still young and while the gleba is still white and firm. Consumption of older specimens with a non-white gleba, or where the gleba has turned into a powdery spore mass, may cause stomach upsets. This species has a mild taste, and no distinguishable odor, although one source describes the smell of dried fruit bodies as similar to "old ham". One source notes that it is "well flavoured and tender when cooked", while another describes the texture (of edible puffballs in general) as "somewhat like French toast". Antonio Carluccio recommends sautéeing puffballs with other mushrooms. To avoid possible confusion with potentially deadly Amanita species, it is recommended to slice young puffballs with a longitudinal cut to ensure that the flesh is devoid of any internal structures.

== Similar species ==
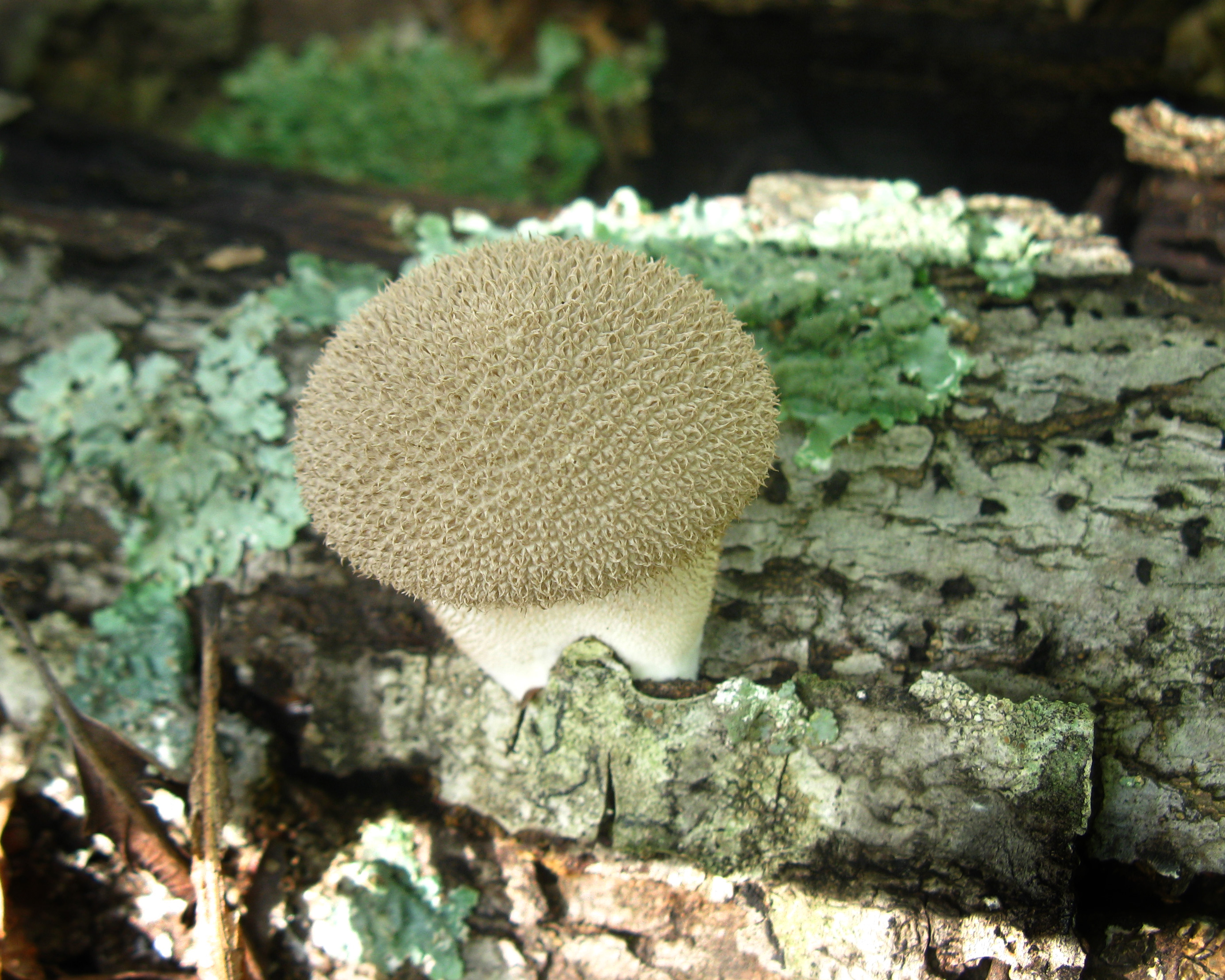
Lycoperdon pulcherrimum has stouter spines than L. echinatum.

Lycoperdon pulcherrimum closely resembles L. echinatum, but its spines are stouter, do not turn brown in age, and the surface of the fruit body underneath the spines is smooth, not pitted. Alexander H. Smith noted that in youth, they are "difficult if not impossible to distinguish from each other, but this will cause no inconvenience to those collecting for the table, since both are edible." In some areas the two species appear to intergrade, as specimens may be found whose spines turn brown but do not fall off. Young specimens of L. pedicellatum may also be difficult to distinguish from L. echinatum, but the former has a smooth outer surface when mature, and has spores attached to a pedicel (a narrow extension of the basidium on which the sterigmata and spores are formed) that is about 4–5 times as long as the spore. Lycoperdon compactum, found only in New Zealand, also resembles L. echinatum in appearance, but differs in having smaller spores, capillitia that are hyaline (translucent) and septate (with partitions that divide the capillitia into compartments).

== Habitat, distribution, and ecology ==
Lycoperdon echinatum can be found either solitary or in small groups. It typically grows on the ground in deciduous forests and grassy areas, glades and pastures, on moss, humus, or woody debris. The fungus has been noted to have a preference for beech woods. Fruit bodies may make their appearance anytime from the late spring to autumn. Older specimens are more likely to be overlooked, as their brown color blends into the surrounding environment of dead leaves and dead wood. The puffball is used by various species of scuttle flies (family Phoridae) as larval food.

This species has been collected from eastern central Africa, China, Costa Rica, Iran, Japan, and Europe (including Britain, Bulgaria, the Czech Republic, Finland, Germany, Italy, Slovakia, Spain, Sweden, and Switzerland). In North America, it is "locally frequent" east of the Rocky Mountains.

It is considered a threatened species in Åland (Finland). A study of the species' distribution in Sweden reported that in the 1940s and 50s, it grew in beech woods with broad-leaved grasses and herbs in topsoils with soil pH levels between 5.0 and 6.6, but the populations have since decreased owing to soil acidification during the last several decades. Fruit bodies collected near arsenic-contaminated sites have been shown to bioaccumulate arsenic, largely in the form of arsenobetaine.

== Antimicrobial activity ==
Using a standard laboratory method to determine antimicrobial susceptibility, methanol-based extracts of Lycoperdon umbrinum fruit bodies were shown in a 2005 study to have "significant" antibacterial activity against various human pathogenic bacteria, including Bacillus subtilis, Escherichia coli, Salmonella typhimurium, Staphylococcus aureus, Streptococcus pyogenes, and Mycobacterium smegmatis. An earlier study (2000) had identified weak antibacterial activity against Enterococcus faecium and Staphylococcus aureus. Although the specific compounds responsible for the antimicrobial activity have not been identified, chemical analysis confirms the presence of terpenoids, a class of widely occurring organic chemicals that are being investigated for their potential use as antimicrobial drugs.

== Bibliography ==
- Coker WS, Couch JN, Johnson MM (1974) [First published 1928]. The Gasteromycetes of the Eastern United States and Canada. New York: Dover Publications. ISBN 0-486-23033-3.
