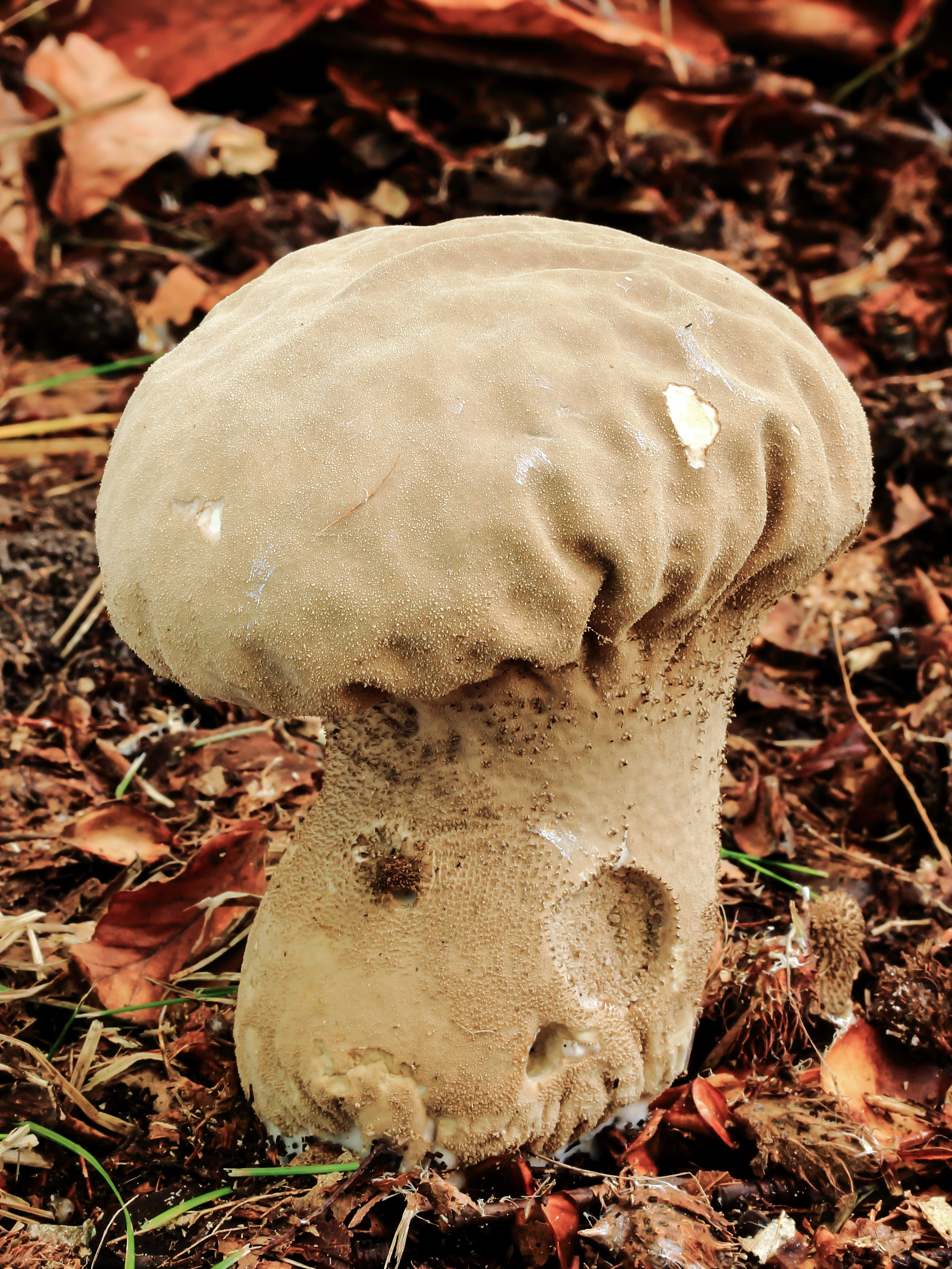

Scientific classification
- Kingdom: Fungi
- Division: Basidiomycota
- Class: Agaricomycetes
- Order: Agaricales
- Family: Lycoperdaceae
- Genus: Lycoperdon
- Species: L. excipuliforme

Binomial name
- Lycoperdon excipuliforme (Scop.) Pers. 1801

Synonyms
- Lycoperdon saccatum (Bull.); "Handkea excipuliformis" Lycoperdon polymorphum var. excipuliforme: Calvatia excipuliformis; Calvatia saccata; Lycoperdon cervinum sensu Bolton (1789); Lycoperdon elatum; Lycoperdon excipuliforme forma flavescens; Lycoperdon excipuliforme var. flavescens

= Lycoperdon excipuliforme =

Species of fungus

Lycoperdon excipuliforme, commonly known as the pestle puffball or long-stemmed puffball, is a species of the family Lycoperdaceae. A rather large puffball, it may reach dimensions of up to 15 cm (5.9 in) broad by 25 cm (9.8 in) tall. Widespread in northern temperate zones, it is found frequently on pastures and sandy heaths.

== Taxonomy ==
This puffball has been variously placed in the genera Bovista, Handkea, Calvatia, and Utraria. In 1989, German mycologist Hanns Kreisel described the genus Handkea to include species of Calvatia that had distinct microscopic features: Handkea species had a unique type of capillitium (coarse thick-walled hyphae in the gleba), with curvy slits instead of the usual pores. Although accepted by some authors, the genus concept has been rejected by others.

Phylogenetic analyses published in 2008 shows that Handkea may be grouped in a clade along with species from several other genera, including Lycoperdon, Vascellum, Morganella, Bovistella, and Calvatia. Published in the same year, another DNA analysis of the structure of ITS2 rDNA transcript confirmed that H. utriformis is closely related to Lycoperdon echinatum.

== Description ==
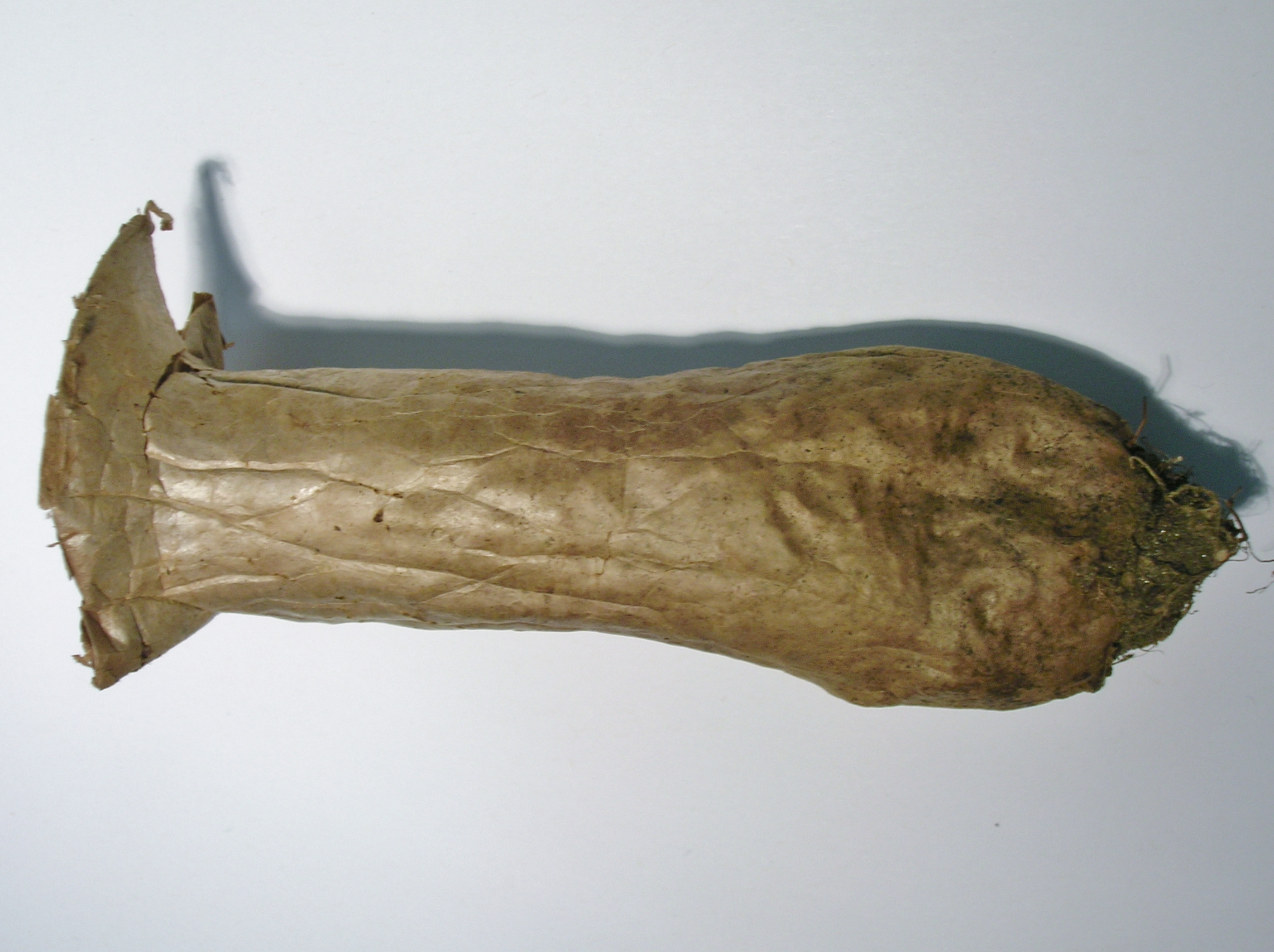
Sterile pestle-shaped base of the puffball.

Like all puffballs, Lycoperdon excipuliforme has a gasteroid basidiocarp, meaning the spores are produced internally, and are only released as the mature fruiting body ages and dries, or is broken. Young puffballs are typically 6 to 12 centimetres (2.4 to 4.7 in) across, white, or pale grey-brown; in maturity it may attain dimensions of 15 centimetres (5.9 in) broad by 25 centimetres (9.8 in) tall. The underside of the puffball is attached to the ground by a root-like assemblage of hyphae called a rhizomorph.

== Distribution and habitat ==
Common and widespread from late summer until autumn. The pestle puffball grows singly or in small groups in soil in both coniferous and broadleaf woodland and on short grassland.

== Edibility ==
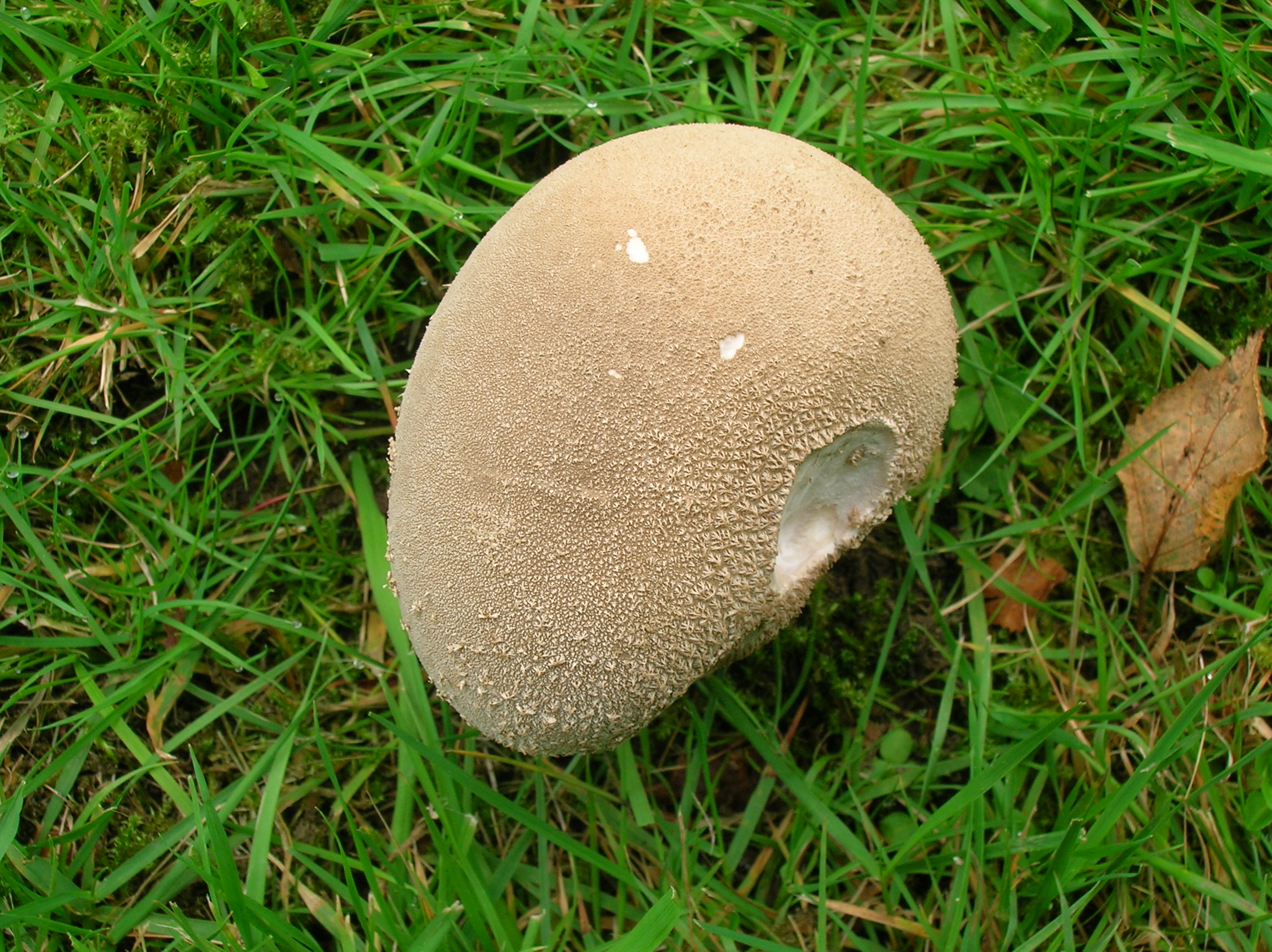
Upper surface of a Pestle Puffball

This fairly large puffball is edible only when the spore-bearing flesh is young and white. The taste and odour are unremarkable, and very similar to the giant puffball, but the flesh is not quite as firm and the outer skin should be removed.
