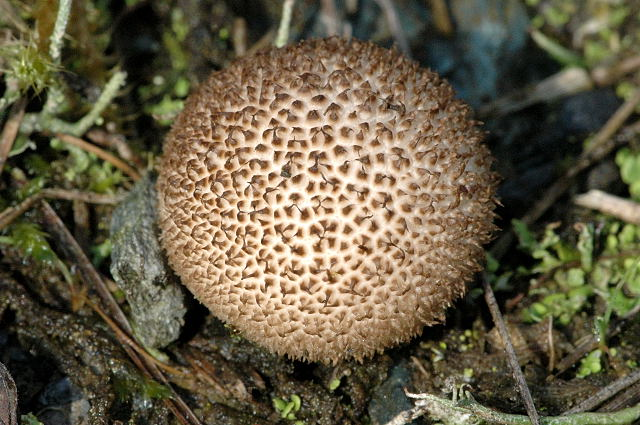
- A similar species. L. nigrescens is darker between the spines.

Scientific classification
- Domain: Eukaryota
- Kingdom: Fungi
- Division: Basidiomycota
- Class: Agaricomycetes
- Order: Agaricales
- Family: Lycoperdaceae
- Genus: Lycoperdon
- Species: L. nigrescens

Binomial name
- Lycoperdon nigrescens Wahlenb. (1794)

Synonyms
- Lycoperdon foetidum Bonord.

= Lycoperdon nigrescens =

Species of fungus

Lycoperdon nigrescens Mycological characteristics
- Glebal hymenium
- No distinct cap
- Hymenium attachment is irregular or not applicable
- Lacks a stipe
- Spore print is olive
- Ecology is saprotrophic
- Edibility is unknown

Lycoperdon nigrescens, with the synonym Lycoperdon foetidum, commonly known as the dusky puffball, is a type of puffball mushroom in the genus Lycoperdon. It was first described scientifically in 1794 by the Swedish naturalist Göran Wahlenberg.

The fruit body grows up to 6 centimetres (2 1/4 in) tall and 4 cm (1 1/2 in) wide. The caps are shaped somewhat like pears, with spines ranging in brightness, which later break off. The surface is dark between the spines. The stipe has thin strands coming from its base. Visually similar to other species when young, it grows increasingly darker with age and lacks the pronounced stipe that old Lycoperdon perlatum specimens attain.

It appears from summer to fall in both conifer and hardwood forests, in addition to alpine areas. Its edibility is unknown, but related puffballs are edible in youth, when still firm and white inside.
