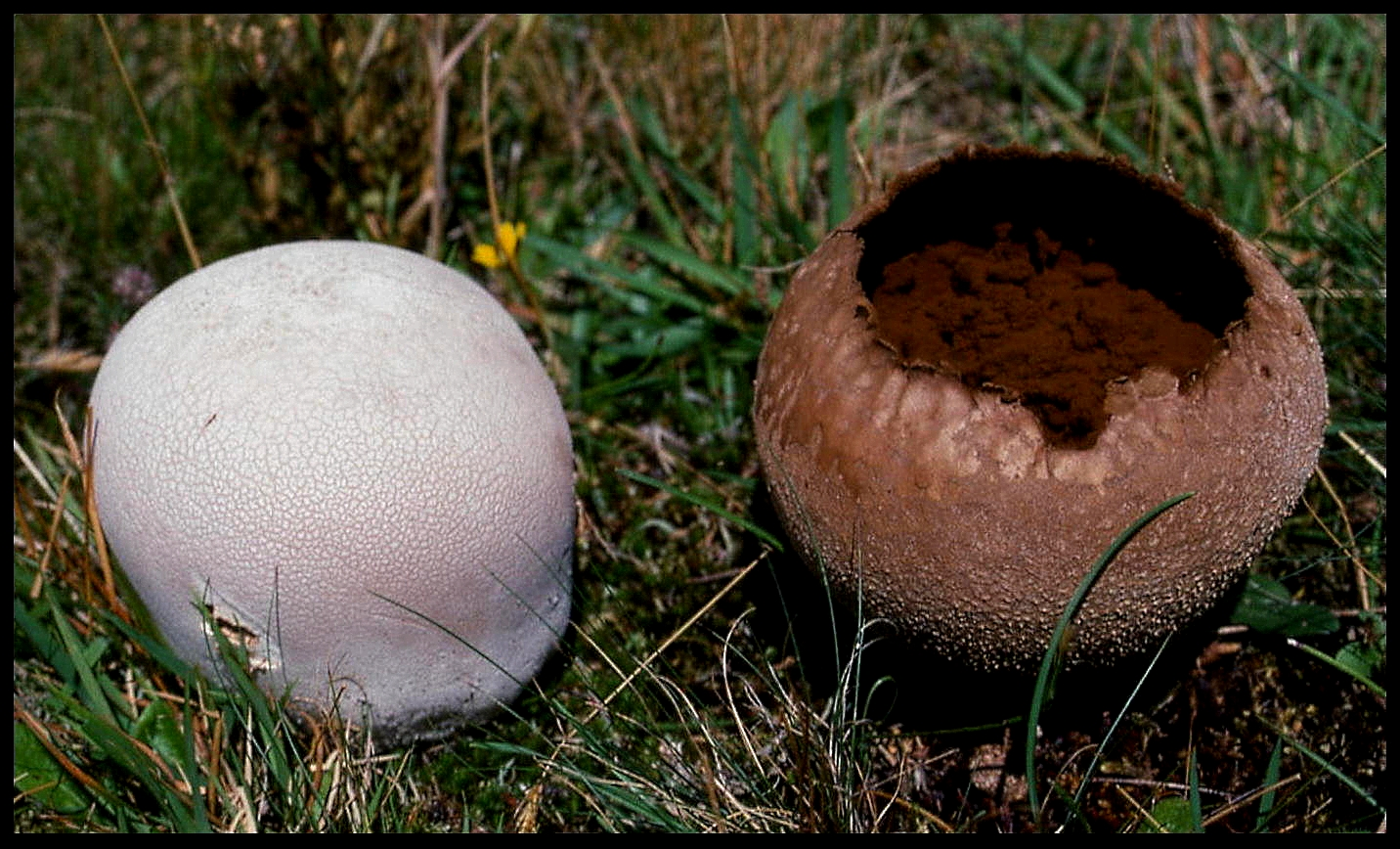
- Handkea utriformis

Scientific classification
- Kingdom: Fungi
- Division: Basidiomycota
- Class: Agaricomycetes
- Order: Agaricales
- Family: Lycoperdaceae
- Genus: Handkea; Kreisel

Type species
- Handkea utriformis (Bull.) Kreisel

= Handkea =

Genus of fungi

Handkea is a genus of puffball mushrooms in the family Agaricaceae. In 1989, German mycologist Hanns Kreisel described the genus Handkea to include species of Calvatia with distinct microscopic features, including a unique type of capillitium (coarse thick-walled hyphae in the gleba), with curvy slits instead of the usual pores. Although accepted by some authors, the genus concept has been rejected by others.

The genus name of Handkea is in honour of Horst-Herbert Handke (1913-2005), who was a German botanist and Professor at the University of Halle.

Phylogenetic analyses published in 2008 shows that Handkea may be grouped in a clade along with species from several other genera, including Lycoperdon, Vascellum, Morganella, Bovistella, and Calvatia.

== Species ==
- H. canadensis
- H. capensis
- H. fumosa
- H. hesperia
- H. lloydii
- H. lycoperdoides
- H. subcretacea
- H. wandae
