= Lycoperdon radicatum =

Scientific classification
- Kingdom: Fungi
- Division: Basidiomycota
- Class: Agaricomycetes
- Order: Agaricales
- Family: Lycoperdaceae
- Genus: Lycoperdon
- Species: L. radicatum

Binomial name
- Lycoperdon radicatum Durieu & Mont. (1848)

Synonyms
- Bovistella radicata (Durieu & Mont.) Pat. (1889); Bovista radicata (Durieu & Mont.) Vassilkov (1954)

Species of fungus

Lycoperdon radicatum
- Mycological characteristics
- Glebal hymenium
- Lacks a stipe
- Spore print is brown
- Ecology is saprotrophic
- Edibility is edible or inedible

Lycoperdon radicatum is a species of puffball mushroom, also called rooting puffball, in the family Agaricaceae. It was described in 1848 by French botanists Michel Charles Durieu de Maisonneuve and Camille Montagne in Algeria. Due to its Bovista-like capillitium it was previously placed in the genus Bovistella. It is nonpoisonous. It is easily recognised by its 4-8 cm rigid, white-gray pseudoroot.

Its cylindrical fruiting body is up to 10 cm in size, and is white when young with a pyramidal warts, becoming yellow-tan, and gray-brown in age. At maturity, it develops a large tear at its apex. The spore mass also changes colour when it ages; initially it is white, and then becomes yellowish and finally, brown. The spores are round to ellipsoid, warted, and 4-5 x 3-4.5 μm in size.

Lycoperdon radicatum is found in grassy areas, pastures and in acidic soils in open woods. It is considered endangered in Sweden.
