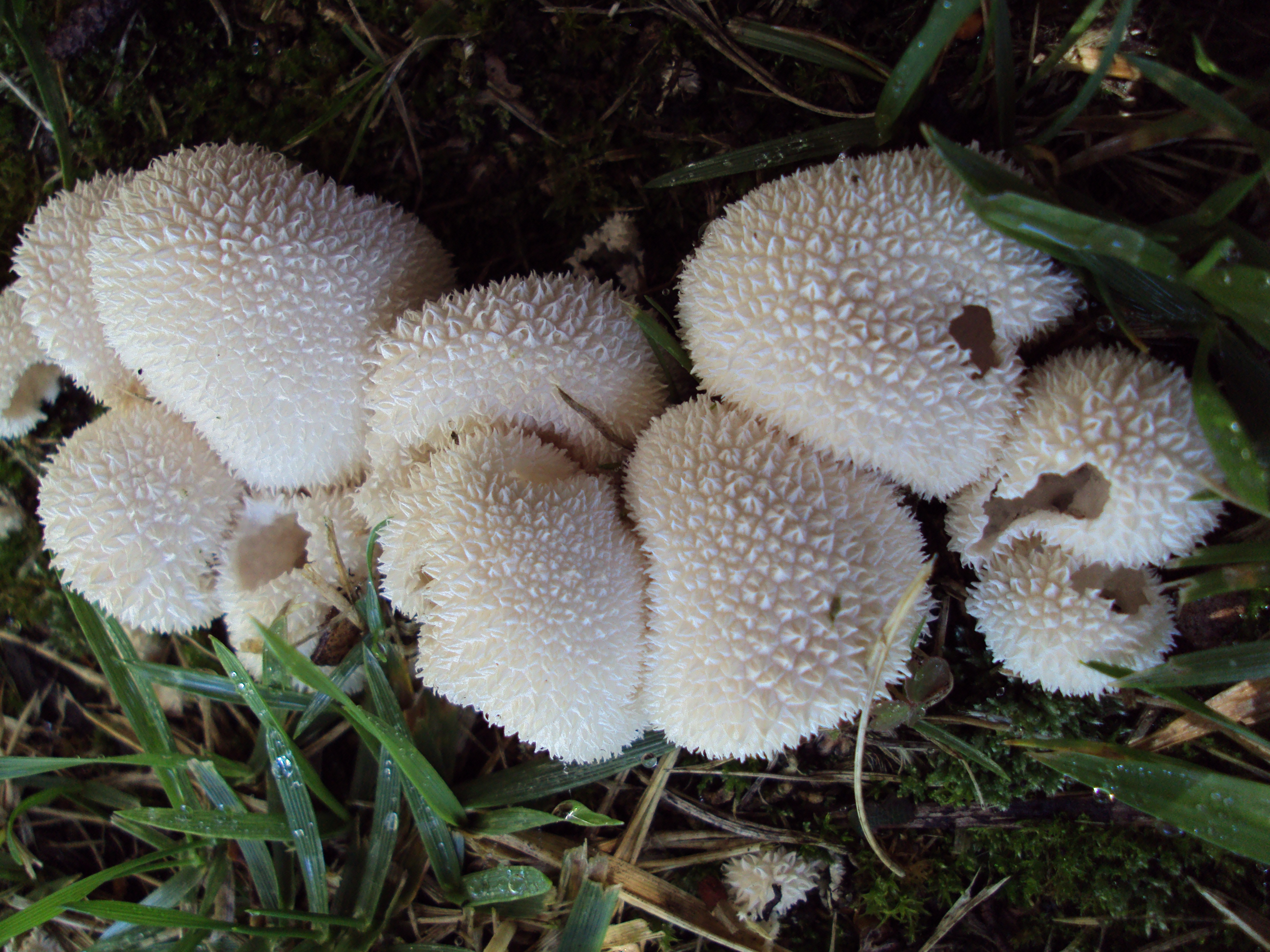

Scientific classification
- Kingdom: Fungi
- Division: Basidiomycota
- Class: Agaricomycetes
- Order: Agaricales
- Family: Lycoperdaceae
- Genus: Lycoperdon
- Species: L. curtisii

Binomial name
- Lycoperdon curtisii Berk. (1873)

Synonyms
- Lycoperdon curtisii Berk. (1859); Vascellum curtisii (Berk.) Kreisel (1963)

= Lycoperdon curtisii =

Lycoperdon curtisii Mycological characteristics
- Glebal hymenium
- No distinct cap
- Hymenium attachment is irregular or not applicable
- Lacks a stipe
- Spore print is olive
- Ecology is saprotrophic

Lycoperdon curtisii is a type of puffball mushroom in the genus Lycoperdon. It was first described scientifically in 1859 by Miles Joseph Berkeley. Vascellum curtisii, published by Hanns Kreisel in 1963, is a synonym. Its fruit bodies (puffballs) have been recorded growing in fairy rings. It is nonpoisonous.
