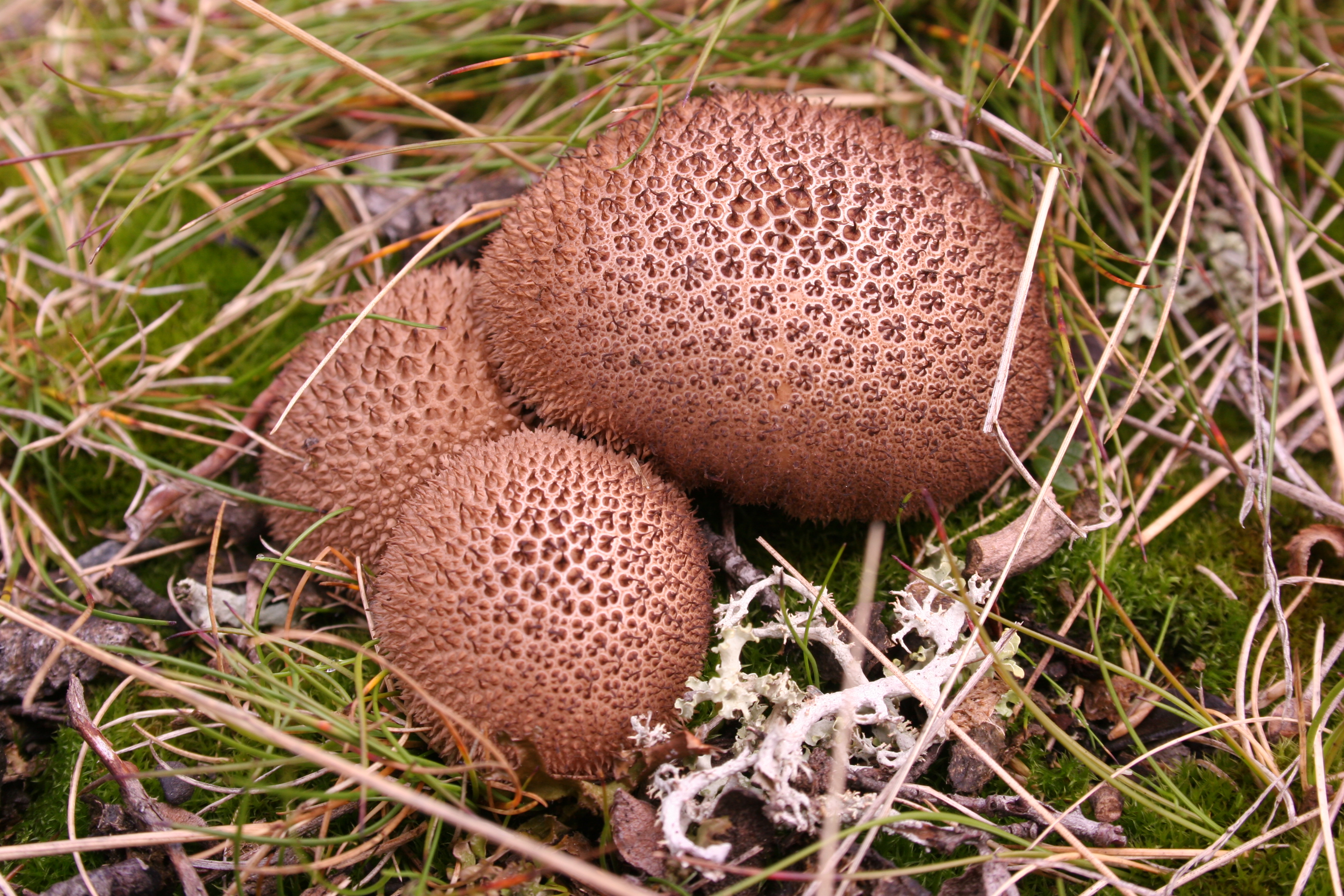
- Lycoperdon umbrinum, found in Gåla (Norway) in late August

Scientific classification
- Kingdom: Fungi
- Division: Basidiomycota
- Class: Agaricomycetes
- Order: Agaricales
- Family: Lycoperdaceae
- Genus: Lycoperdon
- Species: L. umbrinum

Binomial name
- Lycoperdon umbrinum Pers. (1801)

Synonyms
- Lycoperdon gemmatum var. molle De Toni & Fischer (1888); Lycoperdon gemmatum var. furfuraceum Fr. Lundae(1829); Lycoperdon gemmatum var. furfuraceum (Fr.) J. Kickx f. Flandres(1867)

= Lycoperdon umbrinum =

Umber-brown puffball, a fungus

Lycoperdon umbrinum Mycological characteristics
- Glebal hymenium
- No distinct cap
- Hymenium attachment is irregular or not applicable
- Lacks a stipe
- Spore print is olive
- Ecology is saprotrophic
- Edibility is edible

Lycoperdon umbrinum, commonly known as the umber-brown puffball, is a type of Puffball mushroom in the genus Lycoperdon. It is a saprophyte, and grows mainly in coniferous forests. It is found in China, Europe, Africa, and North America.

== Description ==
This species has a fruit body that is shaped like a top, with a short, partly buried stipe. It is 2 to 5 cm (0.8 to 2.0 in) tall and 1 to 4 cm (0.4 to 1.6 in) broad. It is approximately the size of a golf ball but may grow to be as big as a tennis ball. Lycoperdon umbrinum is very similar to Lycoperdon molle. Key differences include that the spines on L. umbrinum are sparser and that the spores of L. molle are much larger. The spores of L. umbrinum are spherical and either smooth or ornamented with spines. In the KOH test, the spores appear olive-yellow.

The fruit body is initially pale brown then reddish to blackish brown, and the outer wall has slender, persistent spines up to 1 mm long. Spores are roughly spherical, 3.5–5.5 μm in diameter, with fine warts and a pedicel that is 0.5–15 μm long. It is uncommon and found mostly in coniferous woods on sandy soils.

The species is considered edible, though caution must be exercised due to a possibility of confusion with the toxic earth ball or deadly Amanita.

== Ecology and habitat ==
This fungus is saprophytic, commonly growing in forests and under conifers. It has also been seen growing in poor quality soil in hardwood and conifer areas. It has been observed growing by itself, dispersed, or many together.

The fruiting period is from June through September. Unlike agarics which have gills that hold spores, when conditions are right, L. umbrinum will become dry and burst to release their spores.

Interestingly, Lycoperdon umbrinum likely has a mycorrhizal relationship with Pinus patula. One study investigated this relationship and found these species were often growing near each other. Additionally, there were development of branched and finger-like mycorrhizae underneath the L. umbrinum fruiting bodies. This study was done in South Africa where it is common that coniferous plants grown on large scale have this mutualism (and L. umbrinum is one of them).

== Edibility and medicinal uses ==
Lycoperdon umbrinum is edible and has been found to have some medicinal purposes. This mushroom has historically been used by the Mam ethnic group in Mexico. They call it “wutz anim” or “dead’s eye” which they use to keep away the evil eye. They typically prepare it by boiling and eat it by itself or with other plants. This group also uses it against asthma (creating a powder mixed with other plants) and additional uses that seem to overlap with the uses of baby powder. In some parts of the country, there is a mushroom gathering tradition (where these mushrooms are used for food, medicine, religious purposes, or for selling) that the whole family is a part of.

In the lab, L. umbrinum has been found to have significant antibacterial properties and potentially antimicrobial properties. It was found that Aspergillus tamarii (an endophytic fungus) is associated with L. umbrinum through a mutualistic relation. A. tamarii, extracted from L. umbrinum, has significant antibacterial properties specifically on Salmonella typhi, Staphylococcus aureus, Bacillus subtilis, and Escherichia coli. L. umbrinum was also found to have antimicrobial activities against methicillin resistant Staphylococcus aureus (MRSA). Lycoperdon umbrinum and Trametes versicolor were found to inhibit the MRSA growth to the greatest degree (compared to the other fungi in the study) indicating that these species could hold a new source of antimicrobial properties to fight MRSA.

Although it may have helpful antibacterial and antimibrobial properties, spore inhalation should be avoided. Inhalation of Lycoperdon spp. could cause lycoperdonosis, a reaction to inhalation or ingestion of puffball spores which can lead to unpleasant symptoms.

== Nutrients ==
Lycoperdon umbrinum contains tocopherols with α- and β- isoforms and has high ash content (indicating it has minerals important for nutrition).
