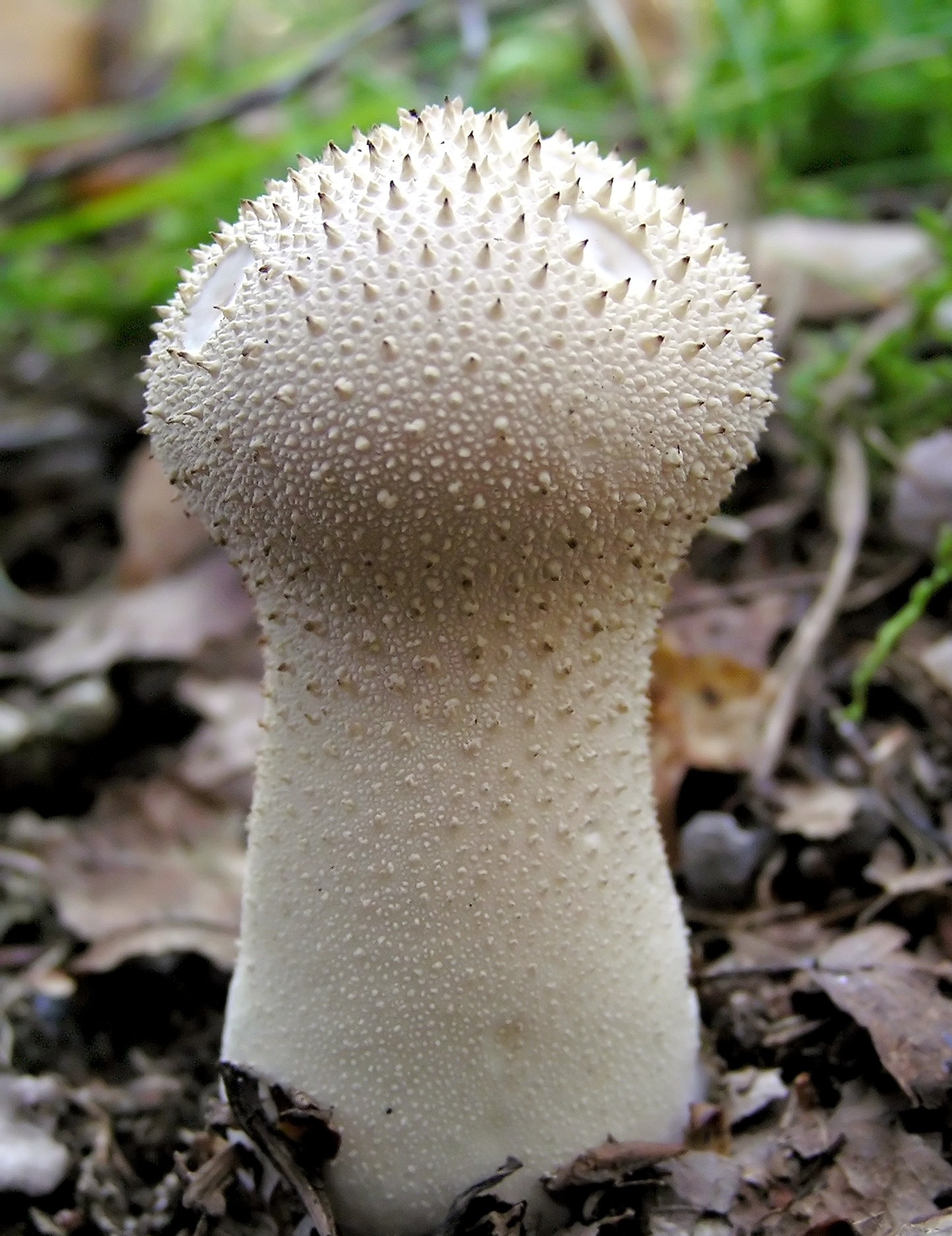

Conservation status
- Least Concern (IUCN 3.1)

Scientific classification
- Kingdom: Fungi
- Division: Basidiomycota
- Class: Agaricomycetes
- Order: Agaricales
- Family: Lycoperdaceae
- Genus: Lycoperdon
- Species: L. perlatum

Binomial name
- Lycoperdon perlatum Pers. (1796)

Synonyms
- Lycoperdon gemmatum Batsch (1783); Lycoperdon gemmatum var. perlatum (Pers.) Fr. (1829); Lycoperdon bonordenii Massee (1887); Lycoperdon perlatum var. bonordenii (Massee) Perdeck (1950)

= Lycoperdon perlatum =

Species of puffball fungus in the family Agaricaceae with a cosmopolitan distribution

Lycoperdon perlatum
- Mycological characteristics
- Glebal hymenium
- Cap is convex
- Hymenium attachment is irregular or not applicable
- Stipe is bare
- Spore print is brown
- Ecology is saprotrophic
- Edibility is choice or inedible

Lycoperdon perlatum, popularly known as the common puffball, warted puffball, gem-studded puffball or devil's snuff-box, is a species of puffball fungus in the family Agaricaceae. It is a medium-sized puffball with a round fruit body tapering to a wide stalk, and dimensions of 1.5 to 6 cm (1/2 to 2 1/4 in) wide by 3 to 10 cm (1 1/4 to 4 in) tall. It is off-white with a top covered in short spiny bumps or "jewels", which are easily rubbed off to leave a netlike pattern on the surface. When mature it becomes brown and a hole in the top opens to release spores in a burst when the body is compressed by touch or falling raindrops.

Common puffball, releasing spores in a burst by compressing the body

A widespread species with a cosmopolitan distribution, the species grows in fields, gardens, and grassy clearings. It is edible when young and the internal flesh is completely white, although care must be taken to avoid confusion with immature fruit bodies of poisonous Amanita species. L. perlatum can usually be distinguished from similar puffballs by differences in surface texture. Several chemical compounds have been isolated and identified from the fruit bodies of L. perlatum, including sterol derivatives, volatile compounds that give the puffball its flavor and odor, and the unusual amino acid lycoperdic acid. Extracts of the puffball have antimicrobial and antifungal activities.

== Taxonomy ==
The species was first described in the scientific literature in 1796 by mycologist Christiaan Hendrik Persoon. Synonyms include Lycoperdon gemmatum (as described by August Batsch in 1783), the variety L. gemmatum var. perlatum (published by Elias Magnus Fries in 1829), L. bonordenii (George Edward Massee, 1887), and L. perlatum var. bonordenii (A. C. Perdeck, 1950).

L. perlatum is the type species of the genus Lycoperdon. Molecular analyses suggest a close phylogenetic relationship with L. marginatum.

The specific epithet perlatum is Latin for "widespread". It is commonly known as the common puffball, the gem-studded puffball (or gemmed puffball), the warted puffball, or the devil's snuff-box; Samuel Frederick Gray called it the pearly puff-ball in his 1821 work A Natural Arrangement of British Plants. Because some indigenous peoples thought that the spores caused blindness, the puffball has some local names such as "blindman's bellows" and "no-eyes".

== Description ==
The fruit body ranges in shape from pear-like with a flattened top, to nearly spherical, and reaches dimensions of 1.5 to 6 cm (1/2 to 2 1/4 in) wide by 3 to 9 cm (1 1/4 to 3 1/2 in) tall. It has a stem-like base, and is whitish before browning in age. The outer surface of the fruit body (the exoperidium) is covered in short cone-shaped spines that are interspersed with granular warts. The spines, which are whitish, gray, or brown, can be easily rubbed off, and leave reticulate pock marks or scars after they are removed. The base of the puffball is thick. It is initially white, but turns yellow, olive, or brownish in age. The reticulate pattern resulting from the rubbed-off spines is less evident on the base.

In maturity, the exoperidium at the top of the puffball sloughs away, revealing a pre-formed hole (ostiole) in the endoperidium, through which the spores can escape. In young puffballs, the internal contents, the gleba, is white and firm, but turns brown and powdery as the spores mature. The gleba contains minute chambers that are lined with hymenium (the fertile, spore-bearing tissue); the chambers collapse when the spores mature. Mature puffballs release their powdery spores through the ostiole when they are compressed by touch or falling raindrops. A study of the spore release mechanism in L. pyriforme using high-speed schlieren photography determined that raindrops of 1 mm diameter or greater, including rain drips from nearby trees, were sufficient to cause spore discharge. The puffed spores are ejected from the ostiole at a velocity of about 100 cm/second to form a centimeter-tall cloud one-hundredth of a second after impact. A single puff like this can release over a million spores.

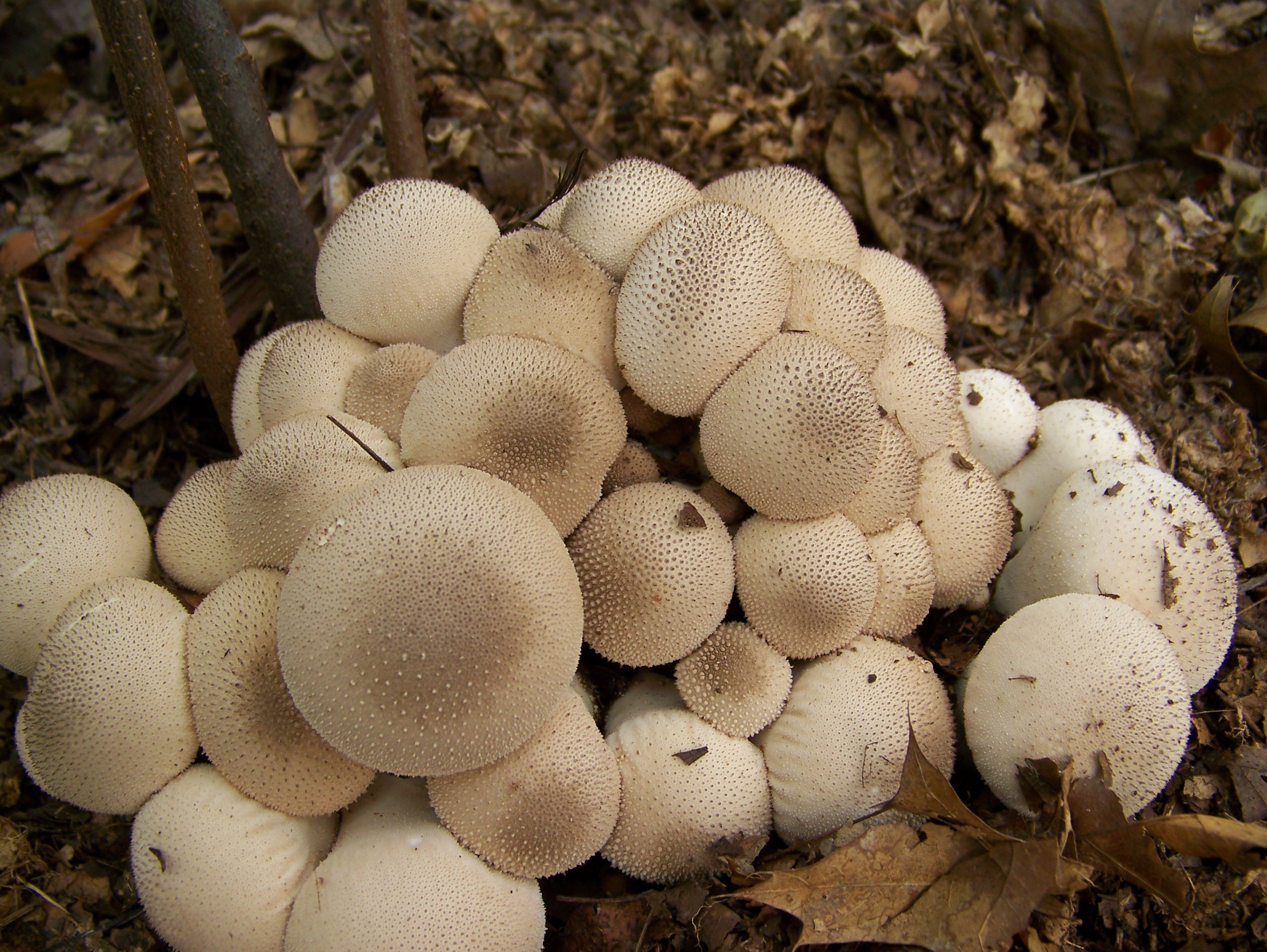
A cluster of fruit bodies

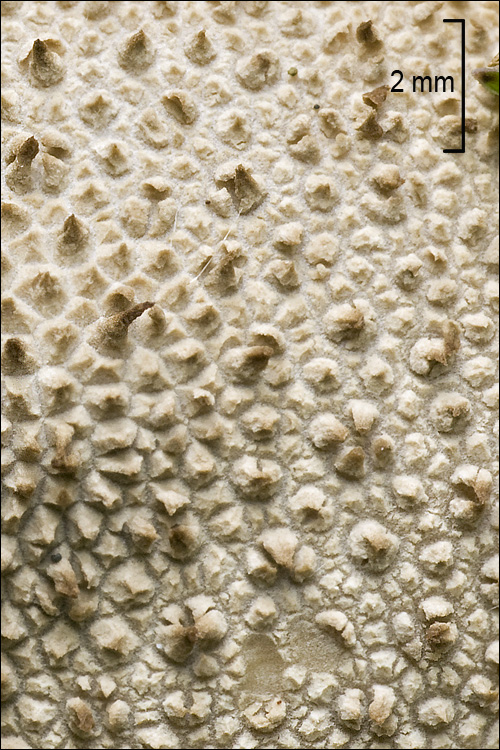
The spiny exoperidium

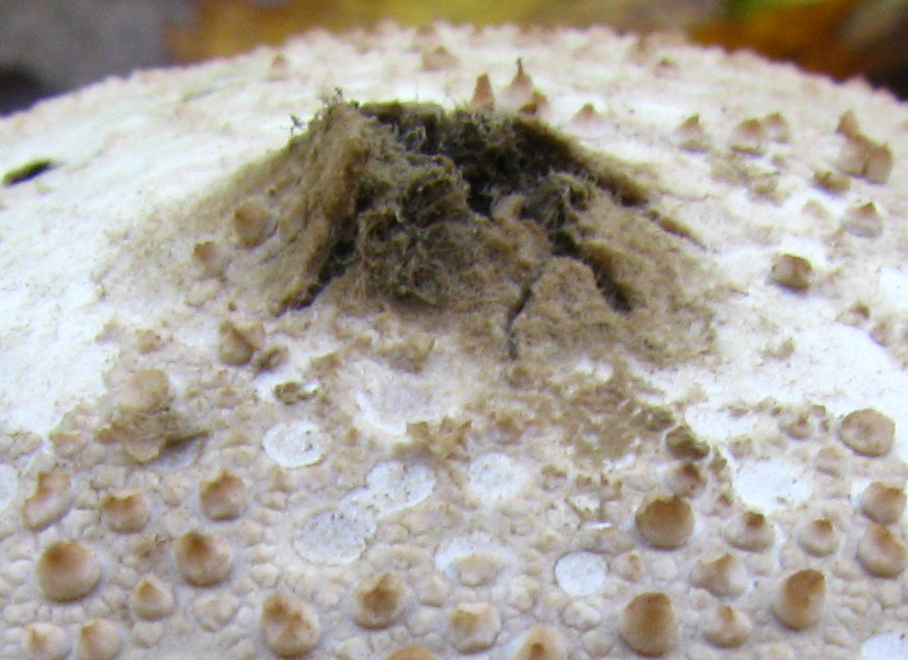
Closeup of the ostiole (with pockmarks left behind from missing spines)

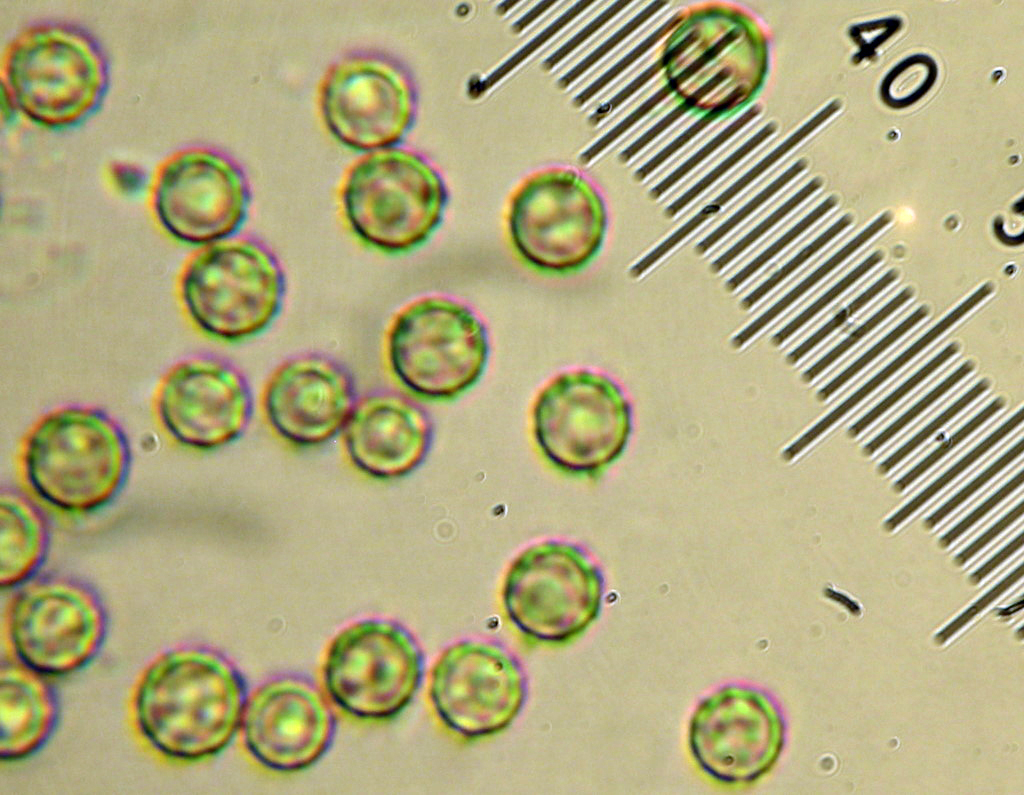
The spores are thick-walled, spherical, and about 4 μm in diameter.

The spores are spherical, thick-walled, covered with minute spines, and measure 3.5–4.5 μm in diameter. The capillitia (threadlike filaments in the gleba in which spores are embedded) are yellow-brown to brownish in color, lack septae, and measure 3–7.5 μm in diameter. The basidia (spore-bearing cells) are club-shaped, four-spored, and measure 7–9 by 4–5 μm. The basidia bear four slender sterigmata of unequal length ranging from 5–10 μm long. The surface spines are made of chains of pseudoparenchymatous hyphae (resembling the parenchyma of higher plants), in which the individual hyphal cells are spherical to elliptical in shape, thick-walled (up to 1 μm), and measure 13–40 by 9–35 μm. These hyphae do not have clamp connections.

=== Similar species ===
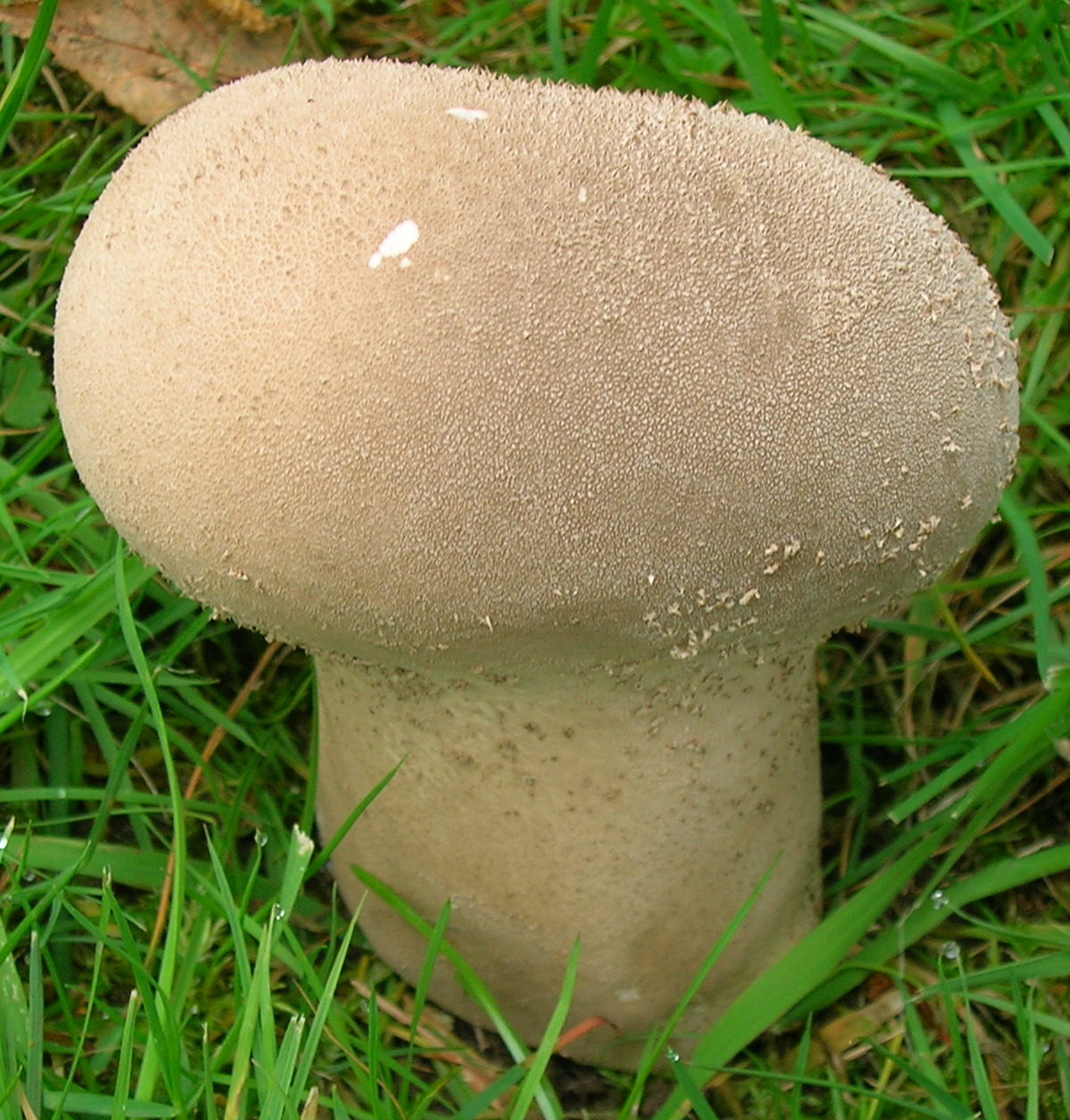
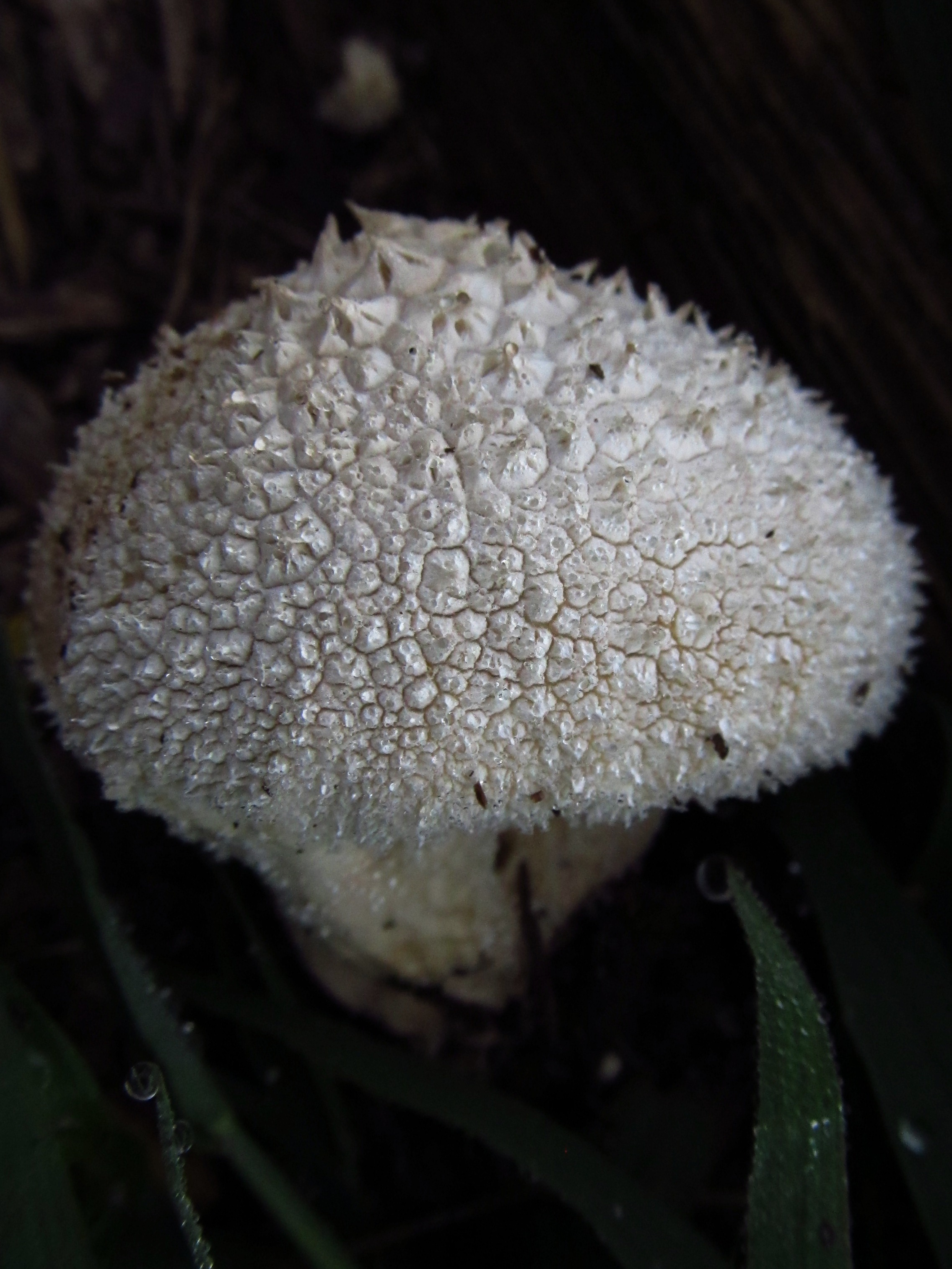
Lycoperdon excipuliforme (left) and L. marginatum (right), two lookalike puffball species

There are several other puffball species with which L. perlatum might be confused. L. nettyanum, found in the Pacific Northwest region of the United States, is covered in granular patches, but these granules adhere more strongly to the surface than those of L. perlatum. L. pyriforme lacks prominent spines on the surface, and grows on rotting wood—although if growing on buried wood, it may appear to be terrestrial. The widely distributed and common L. umbrinum has spines that do not leave scars when rubbed off, a gleba that varies in color from dark brown to purple-brown at maturity, and a purple-tinged base. The small and rare species L. muscorum grows in deep moss. L. peckii can be distinguished from L. pyriforme by the lavender-tinged spines it has when young. L. rimulatum has purplish spores, and an almost completely smooth exoperidium. L. excipuliforme is larger and grayer, and, in mature individuals, the upper portion of its fruit body breaks down completely to release its spores. In the field, L. marginatum is distinguished from L. perlatum by the way in which the spines are shed from the exoperidium in irregular sheets.

== Ecology and distribution ==
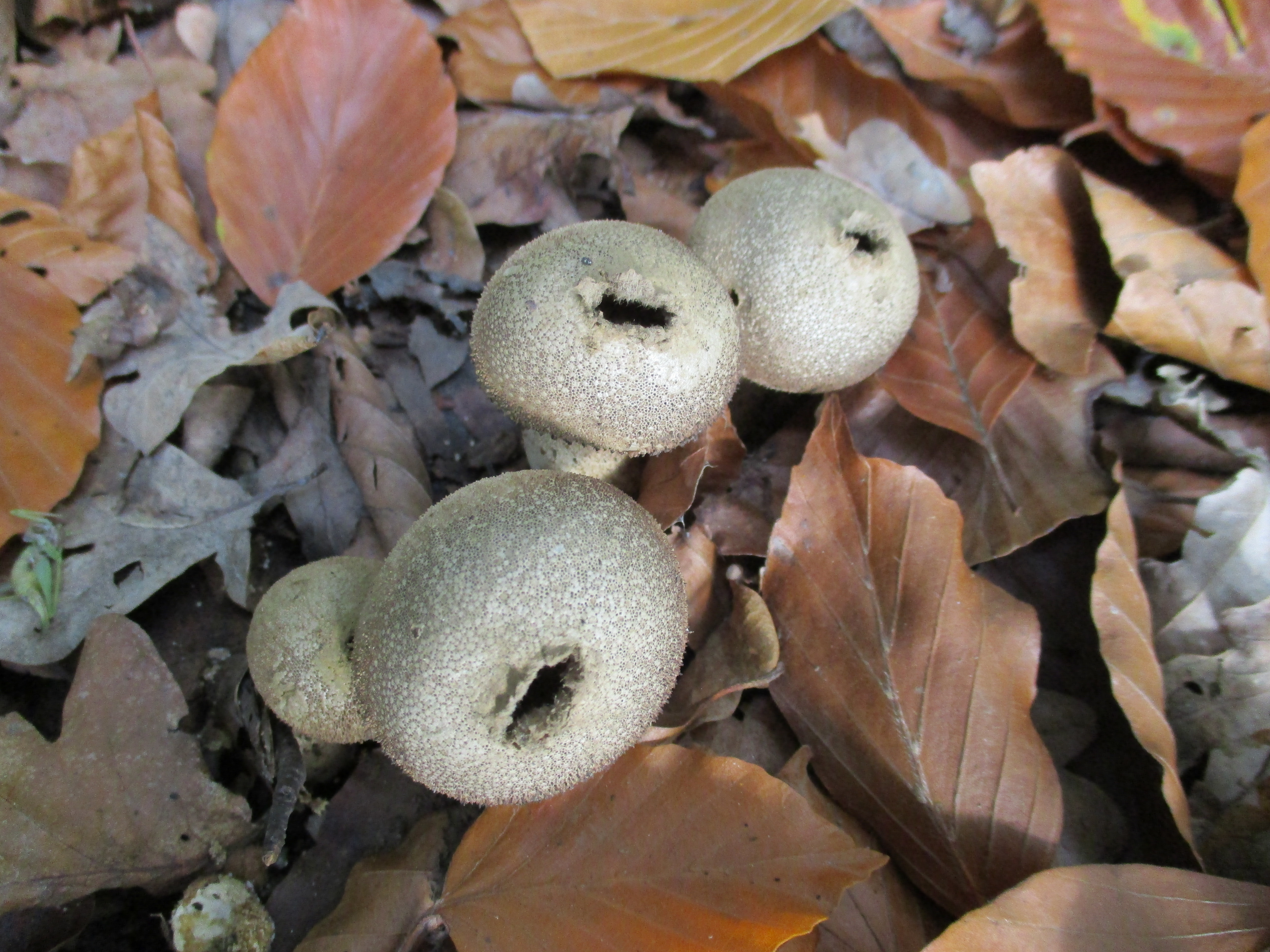
Growing on the ground

A saprobic species, Lycoperdon perlatum grows solitarily, scattered, or in groups or clusters on the ground. It can also grow in fairy rings. Typical habitats include woods, grassy areas, and along roads. It has been reported from Pinus patula plantations in Tamil Nadu, India. The puffball sometimes confuses golfers because of its resemblance to a golf ball when viewed from a distance.

A widespread species with an almost cosmopolitan distribution, it has been reported from Africa (Kenya, Rwanda, Tanzania), Asia (China, Himalayas, Japan, southern India Iran), Australia, Europe, New Zealand, and South America (Brazil). It has been collected from subarctic areas of Greenland, and subalpine regions in Iceland. In North America, where it is considered the most common puffball species, it ranges from Alaska to Mexico, although it is less common in Central America.

The puffball bioaccumulates heavy metals present in the soil, and can be used as a bioindicator of soil pollution by heavy metals and selenium. In one 1977 study, samples collected from grassy areas near the side of an interstate highway in Connecticut were shown to have high concentrations of cadmium and lead. L. perlatum biomass has been shown experimentally to remove mercury ions from aqueous solutions, and is being investigated for potential use as a low-cost, renewable, biosorptive material in the treatment of water and wastewater containing mercury.

== Edibility ==
Lycoperdon perlatum, dried
Nutritional value per 100 g (3.5 oz)
- Energy: 1,845.5 kJ (441.1 kcal)
- Carbohydrates: 42 g
- Fat: 10.6 g
- Protein: 44.9 g
Vitamins and minerals
Minerals	Quantity %DV^{†}
Copper	56% 0.5 mg
Iron	31% 5.5 mg
Manganese	26% 0.6 mg
Zinc	5% 0.5 mg
- ^{†}Percentages estimated using US recommendations for adults.

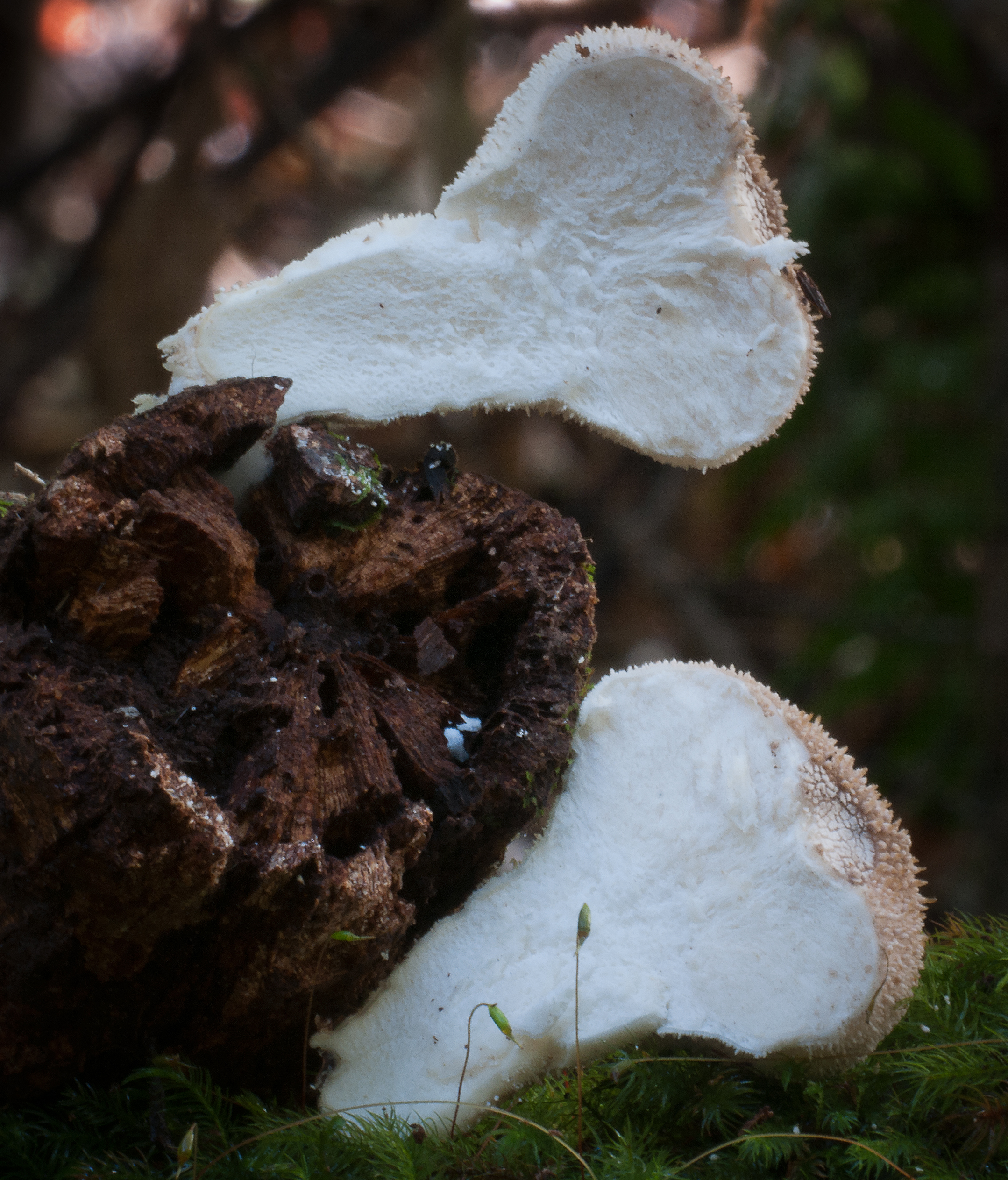
Fruit bodies are edible when the gleba is white and firm.

Lycoperdon perlatum is considered a good edible mushroom when young, when the gleba is still homogeneous and white. They have been referred to as "poor man's sweetbread" due to their texture and flavor. The fruit bodies can be eaten after slicing and frying in batter or egg and breadcrumbs, or used in soups as a substitute for dumplings. As early as 1861, Elias Fries recommended them dried and served with salt, pepper, and oil. The puffballs become inedible as they mature: the gleba becomes yellow-tinged then finally develops into a mass of powdery olive-green spores. L. perlatum is one of several edible species sold in markets in the Mexican states of Puebla and Tlaxcala. The fruit bodies are appealing to animals as well: the northern flying squirrel (Glaucomys sabrinus) includes the puffball in their diet of non-truffle fungi, while the "puffball beetle" Caenocara subglobosum uses the fruit body for shelter and breeding. Nutritional analysis indicates that the puffballs are a good source of protein, carbohydrates, fats, and several micronutrients. The predominant fatty acids in the puffball are linoleic acid (37% of the total fatty acids), oleic acid (24%), palmitic acid (14.5%), and stearic acid (6.4%).

The immature 'buttons' or 'eggs' of deadly Amanita species can be confused with puffballs. This can be avoided by slicing fruit bodies vertically and inspecting them for the internal developing structures of a mushroom, which would indicate the poisonous Amanita. Additionally, amanitas will generally not have "jewels" or a bumpy external surface.

The spores' surfaces have many microscopic spines and can cause severe irritation of the lung (lycoperdonosis) when inhaled. This condition has been reported to afflict dogs that play or run where the puffballs are present.

== Chemistry ==
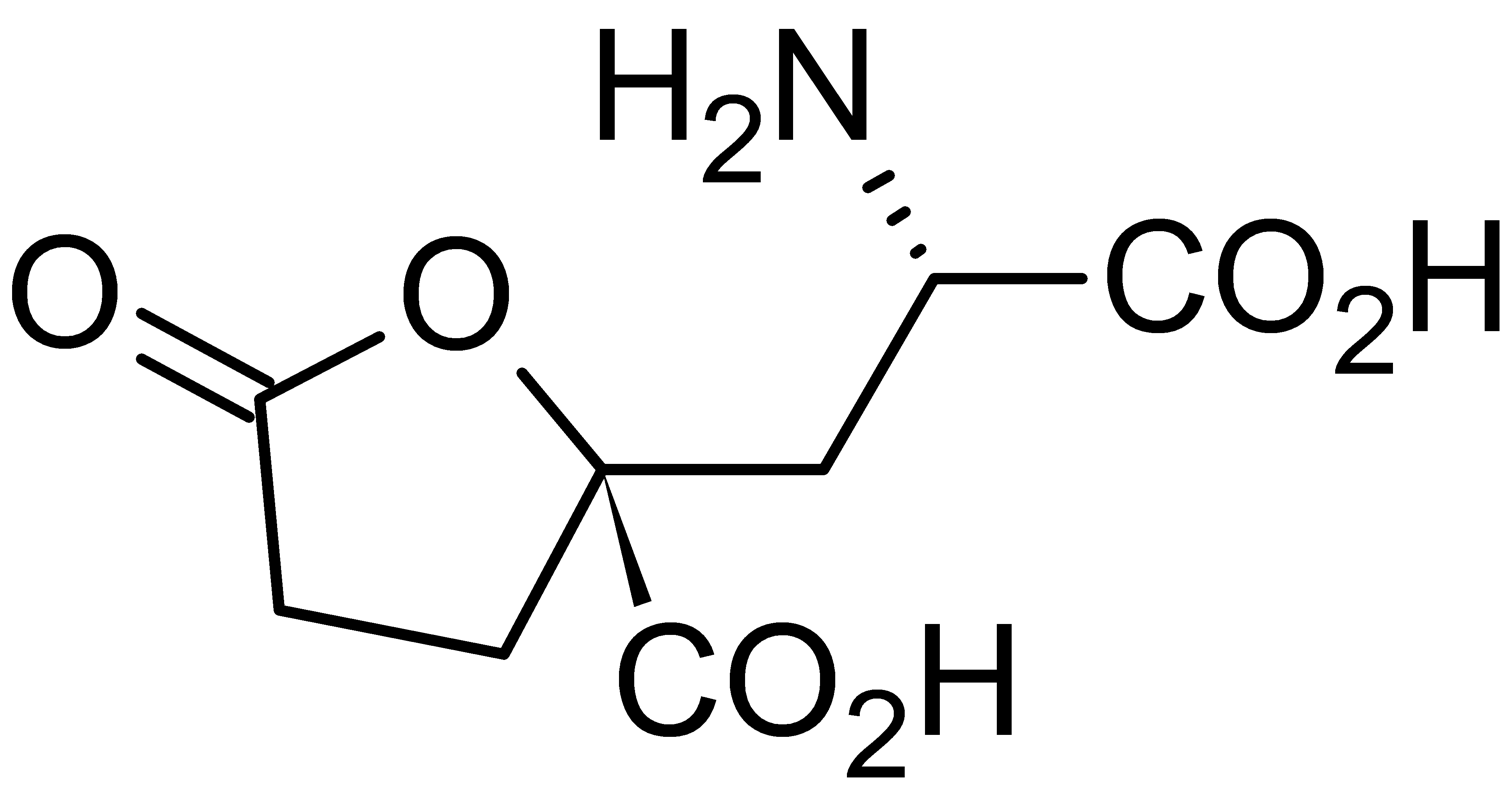
Lycoperdic acid is an amino acid known only from L. perlatum.

Several steroid derivatives have been isolated and identified from fruit bodies of L. perlatum, including (S)-23-hydroxylanostrol, ergosterol α-endoperoxide, ergosterol 9,11-dehydroendoperoxide and (23E)-lanosta-8,23-dien-3β,25-diol. The compounds 3-octanone, 1-octen-3-ol, and (Z)-3-octen-1-ol are the predominant components of the volatile chemicals that give the puffball its odor and flavor. Extracts of the puffball contain relatively high levels of antimicrobial activity against laboratory cultures of the human pathogenic bacteria Bacillus subtilis, Staphylococcus aureus, Escherichia coli, and Pseudomonas aeruginosa, with activity comparable to that of the antibiotic ampicillin. These results corroborate an earlier study that additionally reported antibacterial activity against Salmonella enterica serovar Typhimurium, Streptococcus pyogenes, and Mycobacterium smegmatis. Extracts of the puffball have also been reported to have antifungal activity against Candida albicans, C. tropicalis, Aspergillus fumigatus, Alternaria solani, Botrytis cinerea, and Verticillium dahliae. A 2009 study found L. perlatum puffballs to contain cinnamic acid at a concentration of about 14 milligrams per kilogram of mushroom. The fruit bodies contain the pigment melanin.

The amino acid lycoperdic acid (chemical name 3-(5(S)-carboxy-2-oxotetrahydrofuran-5(S)-yl)-2(S)-alanine) was isolated from the puffball, and reported in a 1978 publication. Based on the structural similarity of the new amino acid with (S)-glutamic acid, (S)-(+)-lycoperdic acid is expected to have antagonistic or agonistic activity for the glutamate receptor in the mammalian central nervous system. Methods to synthesize the compounds were reported in 1992, 1995, and 2002.

== In culture ==
The species is popular on postage stamps and has been depicted on stamps from Guinea, Paraguay, Romania, Sierra Leone, and Sweden.
