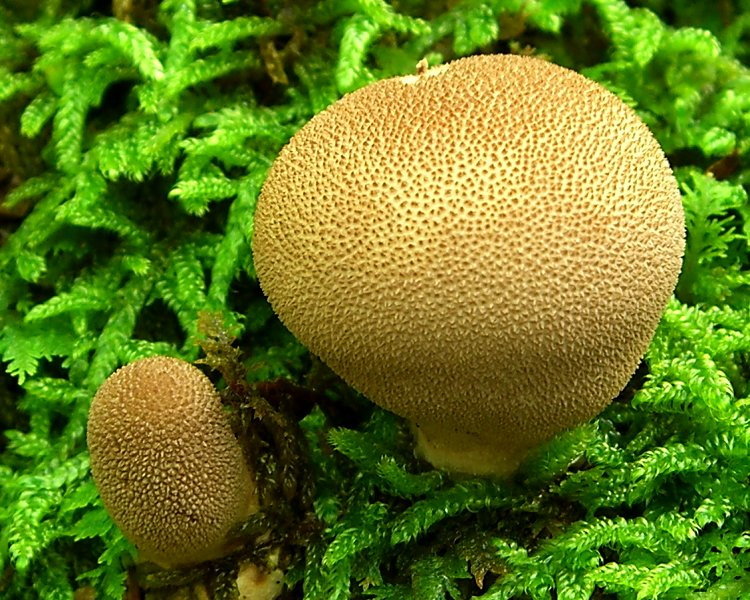

Scientific classification
- Domain: Eukaryota
- Kingdom: Fungi
- Division: Basidiomycota
- Class: Agaricomycetes
- Order: Agaricales
- Family: Lycoperdaceae
- Genus: Lycoperdon
- Species: L. subincarnatum

Binomial name
- Lycoperdon subincarnatum Peck (1872)

Synonyms
- Morganella subincarnata (Peck) Kreisel & Dring (1967)

= Lycoperdon subincarnatum =

Species of fungus

Lycoperdon subincarnatum is a type of puffball mushroom in the genus Lycoperdon (family Agaricaceae). It was first officially described in 1872 by American mycologist Charles Horton Peck. The puffball is found in North America and China.
