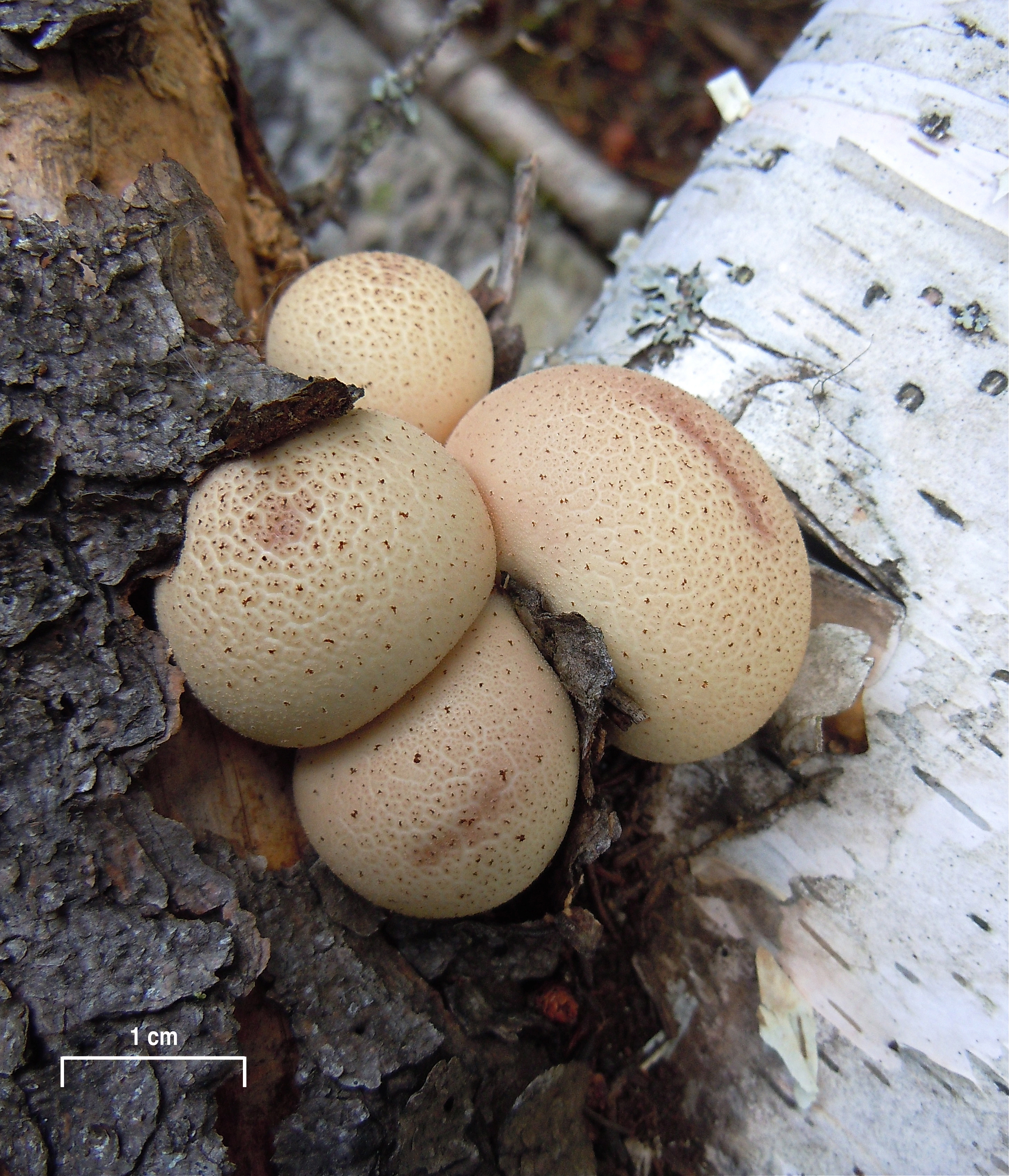

Scientific classification
- Kingdom: Fungi
- Division: Basidiomycota
- Class: Agaricomycetes
- Order: Agaricales
- Family: Lycoperdaceae
- Genus: Apioperdon (Kreisel & D. Krüger) Vizzini
- Species: A. pyriforme

Binomial name
- Apioperdon pyriforme (Schaeff.) Vizzini

Synonyms
- Lycoperdon pyriforme Schaeff.; Lycoperdon pyriforme β tessellatum Pers. (1801); Morganella pyriformis (Schaeff.) Kreisel & D.Krüger (2003)

= Apioperdon =

Genus of fungi

Apioperdon
- Mycological characteristics
- Glebal hymenium
- No distinct cap
- Hymenium attachment is irregular or not applicable
- Lacks a stipe
- Spore print is white to olive-brown
- Ecology is saprotrophic
- Edibility is choice

Apioperdon pyriforme, commonly known as the pear-shaped puffball or stump puffball, is a species of fungus. It is often called Lycoperdon pyriforme, but was transferred to Apioperdon in 2017. It is the only species in the genus.

It is a saprobic fungus present throughout much of the world, growing on decaying wood. It is considered a choice edible when the inner flesh is solid white and firm.

== Taxonomy ==
The fungus was first described in the scientific literature by Jacob Christian Schaeffer in 1774. In 2001, DNA evidence compiled by Dirk Krüger and a number of other mycologists suggested that the genus Lycoperdon was polyphyletic, with the pear-shaped puffball differing most significantly from the group. This finding was supported by several morphological differences including the presence of rhizomorphs and its preference for wood.

A 2003 publication of further research moved the puffball to the genus Morganella with the specific epithet's ending changed for agreement. In 2008, however, Larsson and Jeppson revisited the phylogeny of the Lycoperdaceae, with a broader sampling of species, and retained the taxon in Lycoperdon. It was renamed Apioperdon pyriforme in 2017 based on phylogenetic and morphological differences. It is the only species in the genus.

The specific epithet pyriforme is Latin for "pear-shaped".

== Description ==
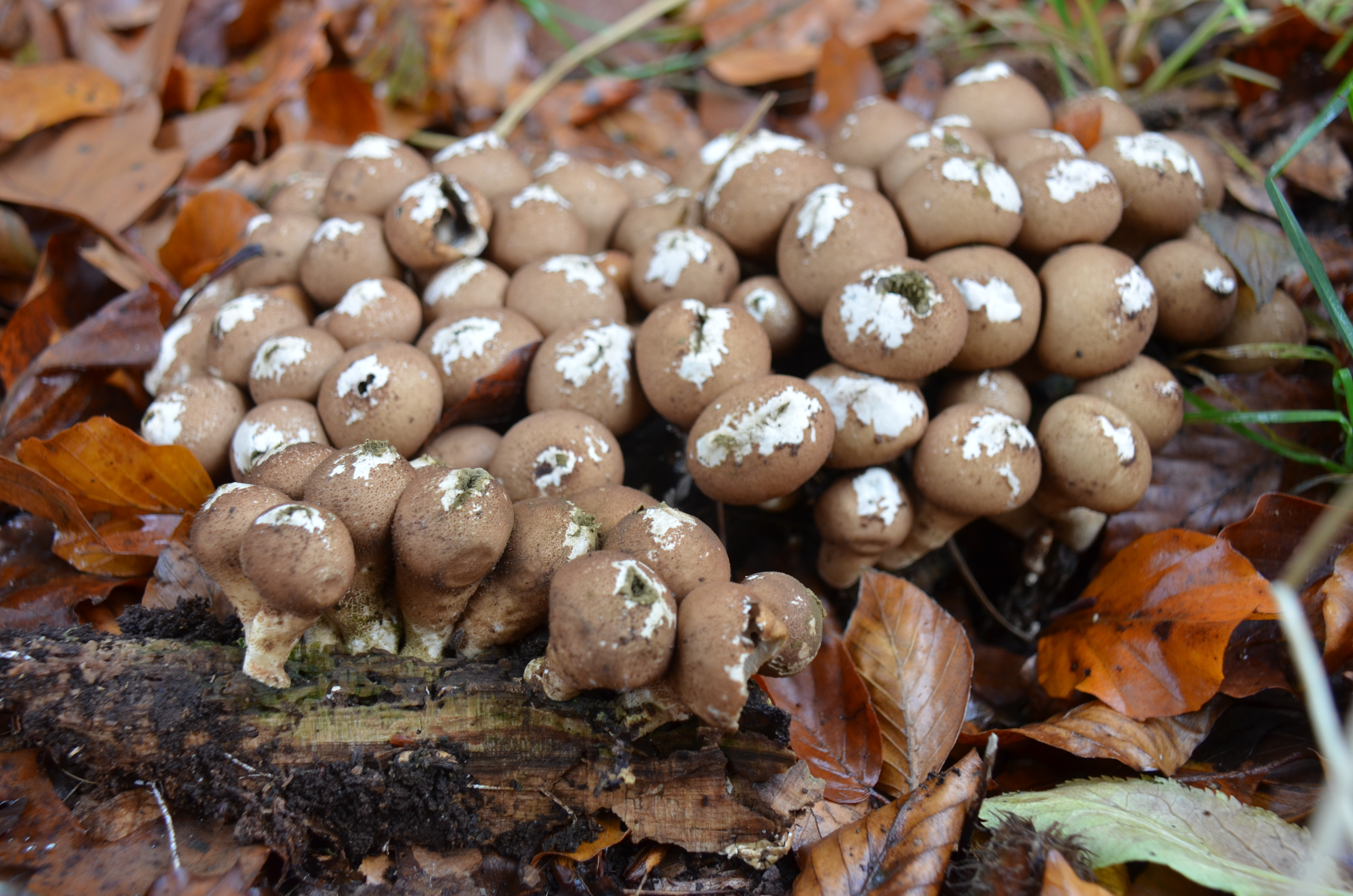
A group of old Apioperdon

The fruit body of the pear-shaped puffball measures up to 3 centimetres (1 1/4 in) wide and 6 cm (2 1/4 in) tall. They are often pear-shaped as the name suggests, but they may also be nearly spherical. When very young they are covered in small white spines that typically fall off before maturity. A small developing pore may be visible at the top, while the sterile base of the mushroom is small and appears to be pinched in. Colour ranges from nearly white to yellowish brown with the darker shades developing with age, though the base remains white. The central pore ruptures at late maturity to allow the wind and rain to disperse the spores. The base is attached to the wood by means of rhizomorphs (thick, cord-like strands of mycelium).

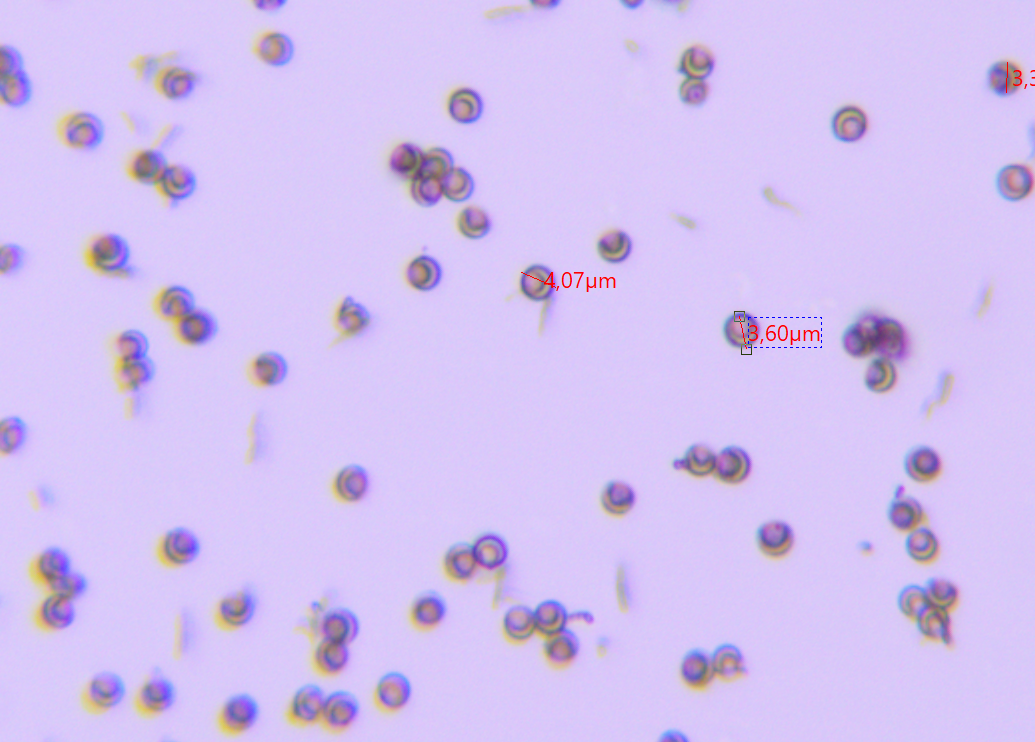
Spore of Apioperdon, with their sizes (in μm)

The gleba, or inner spore mass, is white when young, but it becomes greenish-yellow to dark olive-brown with age. The spores measure 3 to 4.5 μm and are round, smooth and dark olive-brown in colour.

=== Similar species ===
The closely related common puffball, Lycoperdon perlatum is a similar-appearing species, as are the poisonous, unrelated common earthball, Scleroderma citrinum and other species of Scleroderma.

== Distribution and habitat ==
It can be found throughout Europe from July to December. In western North America, it appears from fall to winter. It grows on decaying wood.

== Edibility ==
The fungus is a choice edible when still immature and the inner flesh is white. Additionally, one guide says that the puffballs are edible when densely fruited. They can be used fresh, or cut into thin slices for drying, which can then be pulverized for use as a flavoring powder.

Caution should be used as similar-looking species in Scleroderma (such as S. citrinum) are poisonous.
