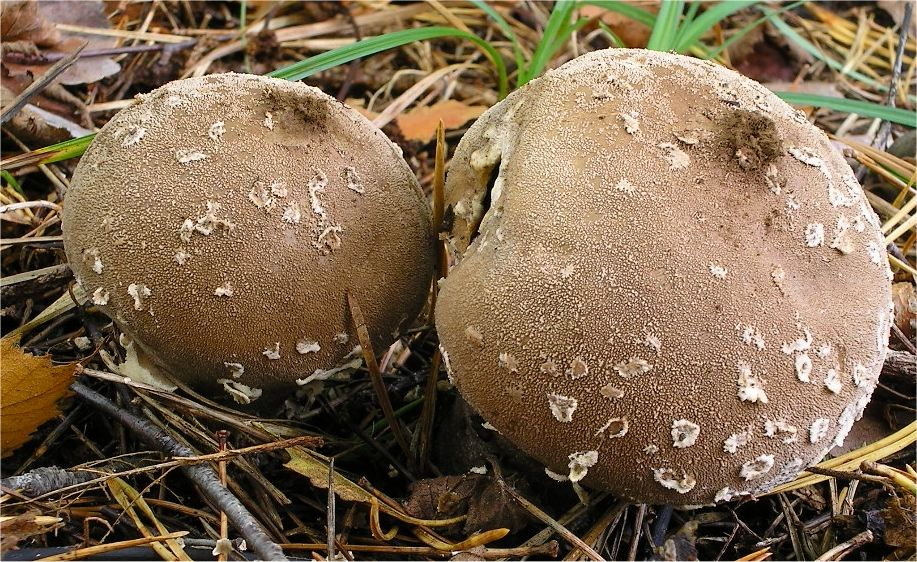

Scientific classification
- Domain: Eukaryota
- Kingdom: Fungi
- Division: Basidiomycota
- Class: Agaricomycetes
- Order: Agaricales
- Family: Lycoperdaceae
- Genus: Lycoperdon
- Species: L. mammiforme

Binomial name
- Lycoperdon mammiforme Pers. (1801)

Synonyms
- Lycoperdon velatum Vittad. (1842); Utraria velata (Vittad.) Quél. (1873)

= Lycoperdon mammiforme =

Species of fungus

Lycoperdon mammiforme Mycological characteristics
- Glebal hymenium
- No distinct cap
- Hymenium attachment is irregular or not applicable
- Lacks a stipe
- Ecology is saprotrophic
- Edibility is inedible

Lycoperdon mammiforme is a rare, inedible type of puffball mushroom in the genus Lycoperdon, found in deciduous forest on chalk soil. It is found in Europe. The fruit body is spherical to pear shaped, at first pure white with slightly grainy inner skin and an outer skin which disintegrates in flakes that are soon shed, later ochre, chocolate-brown when old, up to 7 cm (2.8 in) in diameter.
