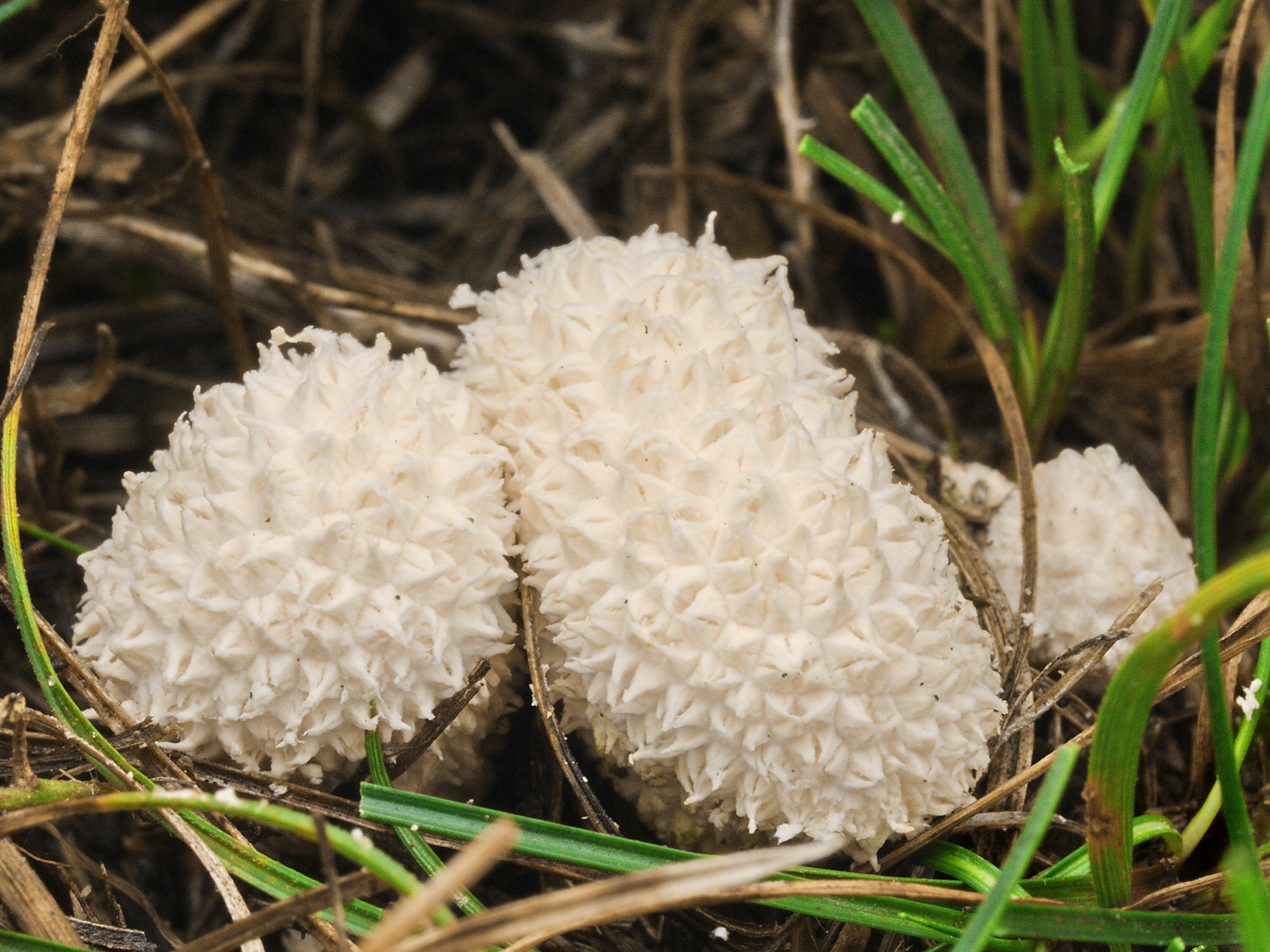

Scientific classification
- Domain: Eukaryota
- Kingdom: Fungi
- Division: Basidiomycota
- Class: Agaricomycetes
- Order: Agaricales
- Family: Lycoperdaceae
- Genus: Lycoperdon
- Species: L. pratense

Binomial name
- Lycoperdon pratense Pers. (1794)

Synonyms
- Vascellum pratense

= Lycoperdon pratense =

Species of fungus

Lycoperdon pratense, commonly known as the meadow puffball, is a type of puffball mushroom in the genus Lycoperdon. In the early stages of development its skin is scruffy whereas its bigger relatives have smooth skins. It grows to 4 centimetres (1 1/2 in) wide and 5 cm (2 in) tall. Its stump-like stem differentiates it from the giant puffball.

It is found in Great Britain and Ireland, including the Outer Hebrides, mainland Europe, and occasionally in North America, and is commonly seen in sand dune systems, where it can be abundant in dune slacks as well as in grassland and lawns (as its vernacular name suggests). The young fruit body is edible cooked.
