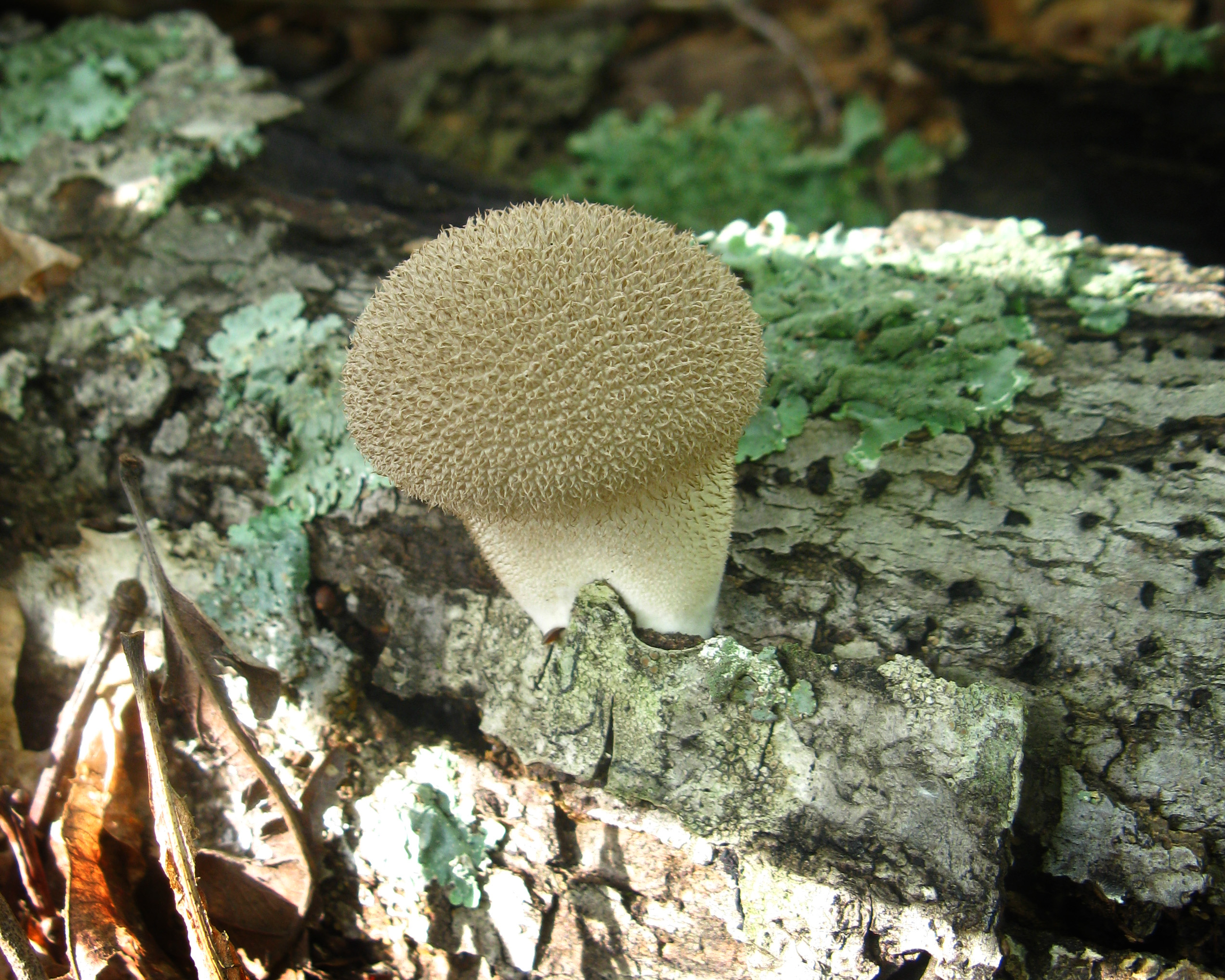

Scientific classification
- Domain: Eukaryota
- Kingdom: Fungi
- Division: Basidiomycota
- Class: Agaricomycetes
- Order: Agaricales
- Family: Lycoperdaceae
- Genus: Lycoperdon
- Species: L. pulcherrimum

Binomial name
- Lycoperdon pulcherrimum Berk. & M.A.Curtis (1873)

= Lycoperdon pulcherrimum =

Species of fungus

Lycoperdon pulcherrimum Mycological characteristics
- Glebal hymenium
- No distinct cap
- Hymenium attachment is irregular or not applicable
- Lacks a stipe
- Spore print is olive
- Ecology is saprotrophic
- Edibility is edible or inedible

Lycoperdon pulcherrimum, commonly known as the long-spined puffball, is a type of puffball mushroom in the genus Lycoperdon. It was first described scientifically in 1873 by Miles Joseph Berkeley and Moses Ashley Curtis.

The fruit body grows to 5 centimetres (2 in) wide and tall. It is generally pear-shaped. The larger portion forms the top and is covered by whitish spines up to 6 millimetres (1/4 in) long. The stemlike portion is a sterile base which is white in youth, aging to purplish brown; it is often wrinkled. The spore mass is initially white and ages to become yellow then dark brownish. It can resemble a number of other species in the genus.

The fungus is found in the southern United States. Like many puffballs, it is edible in youth (when the spore mass is white and firm) but inedible in age. Also being small and infrequent, it is of little culinary value.
