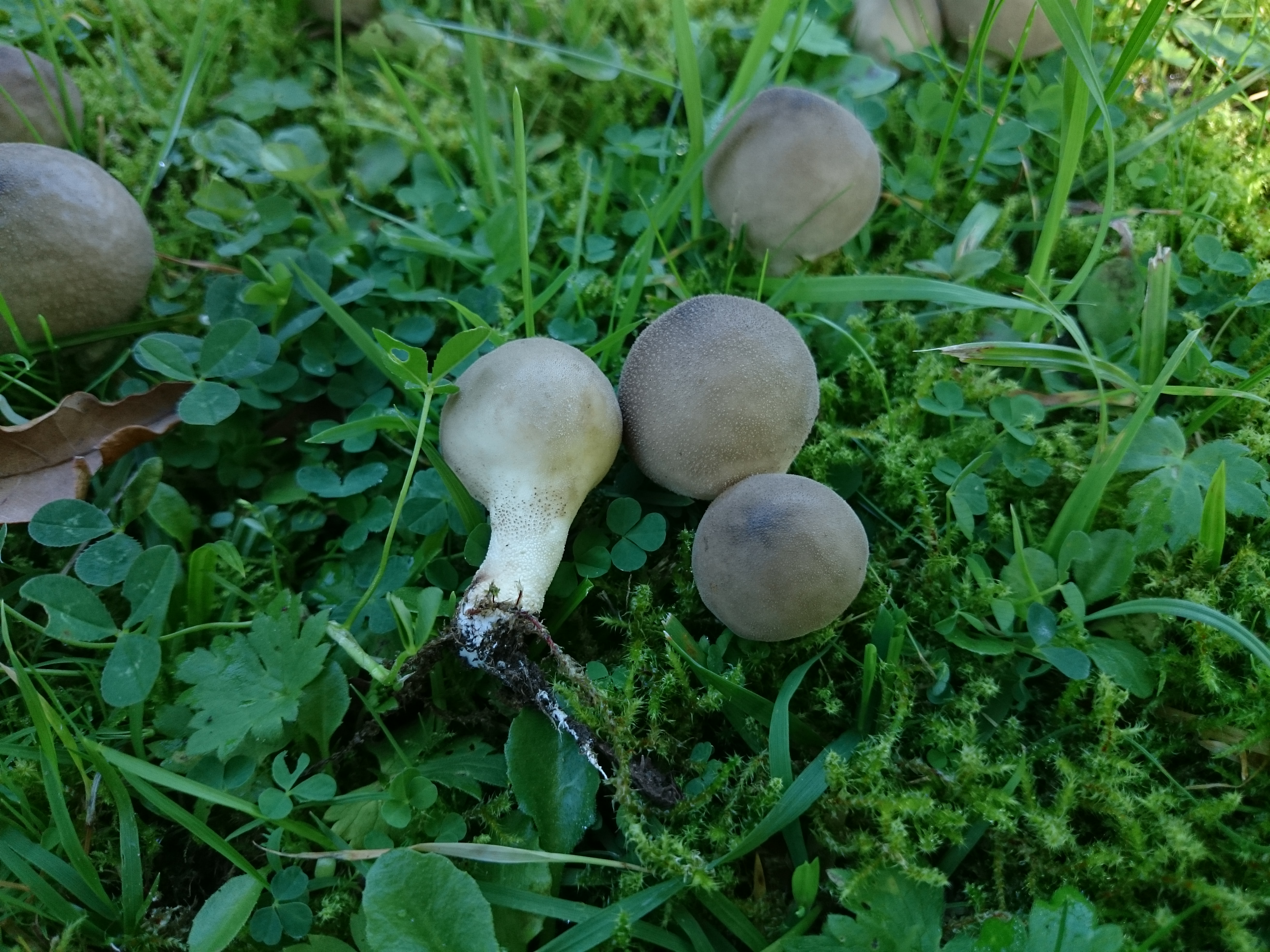

Scientific classification
- Domain: Eukaryota
- Kingdom: Fungi
- Division: Basidiomycota
- Class: Agaricomycetes
- Order: Agaricales
- Family: Lycoperdaceae
- Genus: Lycoperdon
- Species: L. lividum

Binomial name
- Lycoperdon lividum Pers. (1809)

Synonyms
- Lycoperdon cervinum Bolton (1790); Lycoperdon spadiceum Pers. (1809); Lycoperdon cookei Massee (1887)

= Lycoperdon lividum =

Species of fungus

Lycoperdon lividum, commonly known as the grassland puffball, is a type of puffball mushroom in the genus Lycoperdon. It is found in Europe, where it grows on sandy soil in pastures, dunes, and heaths, especially in coastal areas. It fruits in autumn. It was first described scientifically in 1809 by Christian Hendrik Persoon.
