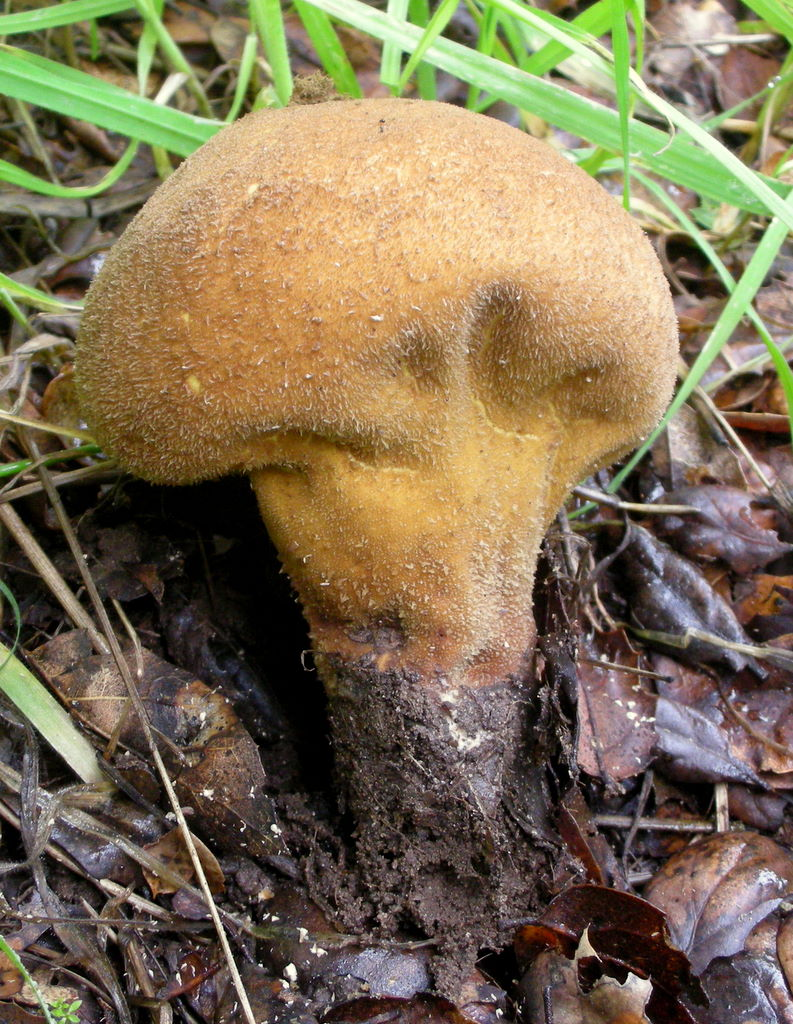

Scientific classification
- Kingdom: Fungi
- Division: Basidiomycota
- Class: Agaricomycetes
- Order: Agaricales
- Family: Lycoperdaceae
- Genus: Lycoperdon
- Species: L. molle

Binomial name
- Lycoperdon molle Pers. (1801)

Synonyms
- Lycoperdon gemmatum var. furfuraceum Fr. (1829); Lycoperdon gemmatum var. molle (Pers.) De Toni (1888)

= Lycoperdon molle =

Lycoperdon molle
- Mycological characteristics
- Glebal hymenium
- No distinct cap
- Hymenium attachment is irregular or not applicable
- Lacks a stipe
- Spore print is olive
- Ecology is saprotrophic
- Edibility is edible

Lycoperdon molle, commonly known as the smooth puffball or the soft puffball, is a type of puffball mushroom in the genus Lycoperdon. It was first described scientifically in 1799 by Dutch mycologist Christiaan Hendrik Persoon. The puffball is edible when the internal flesh is still white.
