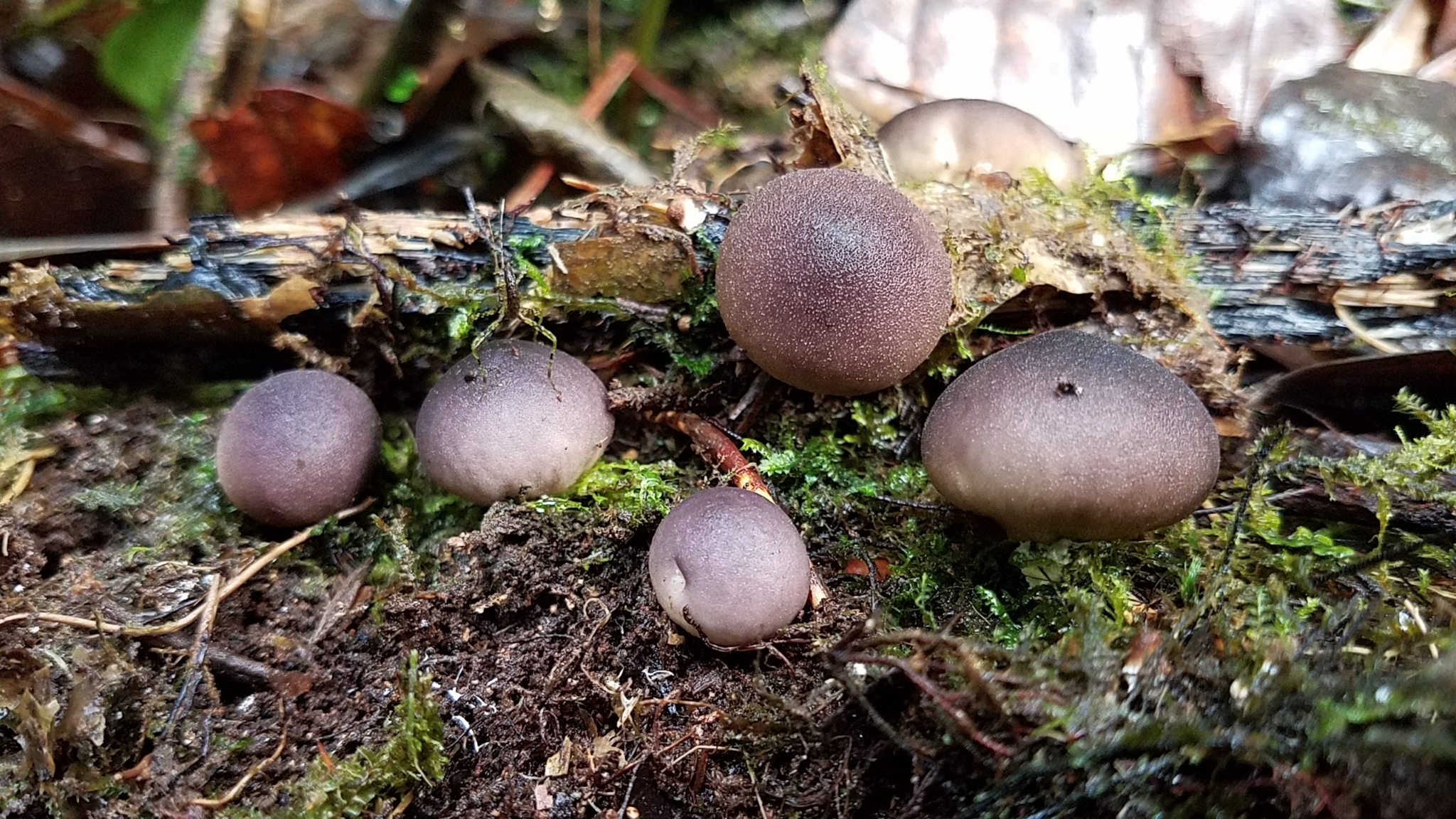
- Morganella mexicana

Scientific classification
- Kingdom: Fungi
- Division: Basidiomycota
- Class: Agaricomycetes
- Order: Agaricales
- Family: Lycoperdaceae
- Genus: Morganella; Zeller (1948)

Type species
- Morganella mexicana Zeller (1948)

Species
- See text

Synonyms
- Lycoperdon subgen. Morganella (Zeller) Jeppson & E.Larss. (2007)

= Morganella (fungus) =

Genus of fungi

Morganella is a genus of puffball fungi in the family Lycoperdaceae. The genus name honors American botanist Andrew Price Morgan (1836–1907). The widely distributed genus is prevalent in tropical areas. A 2008 estimate placed nine species in Morganella, but several new species have since been described.

== Species ==
- Morganella afra
- Morganella albostipitata
- Morganella arenicola
- Morganella benjaminii
- Morganella costaricensis
- Morganella mexicana
- Morganella nuda – Brazil
- Morganella puiggarii
- Morganella purpurascens
- Morganella rimosa
- Morganella samoensis
- Morganella stercoraria
- Morganella sulcatostoma

== See also ==
- List of Agaricales genera
- List of Agaricaceae genera
