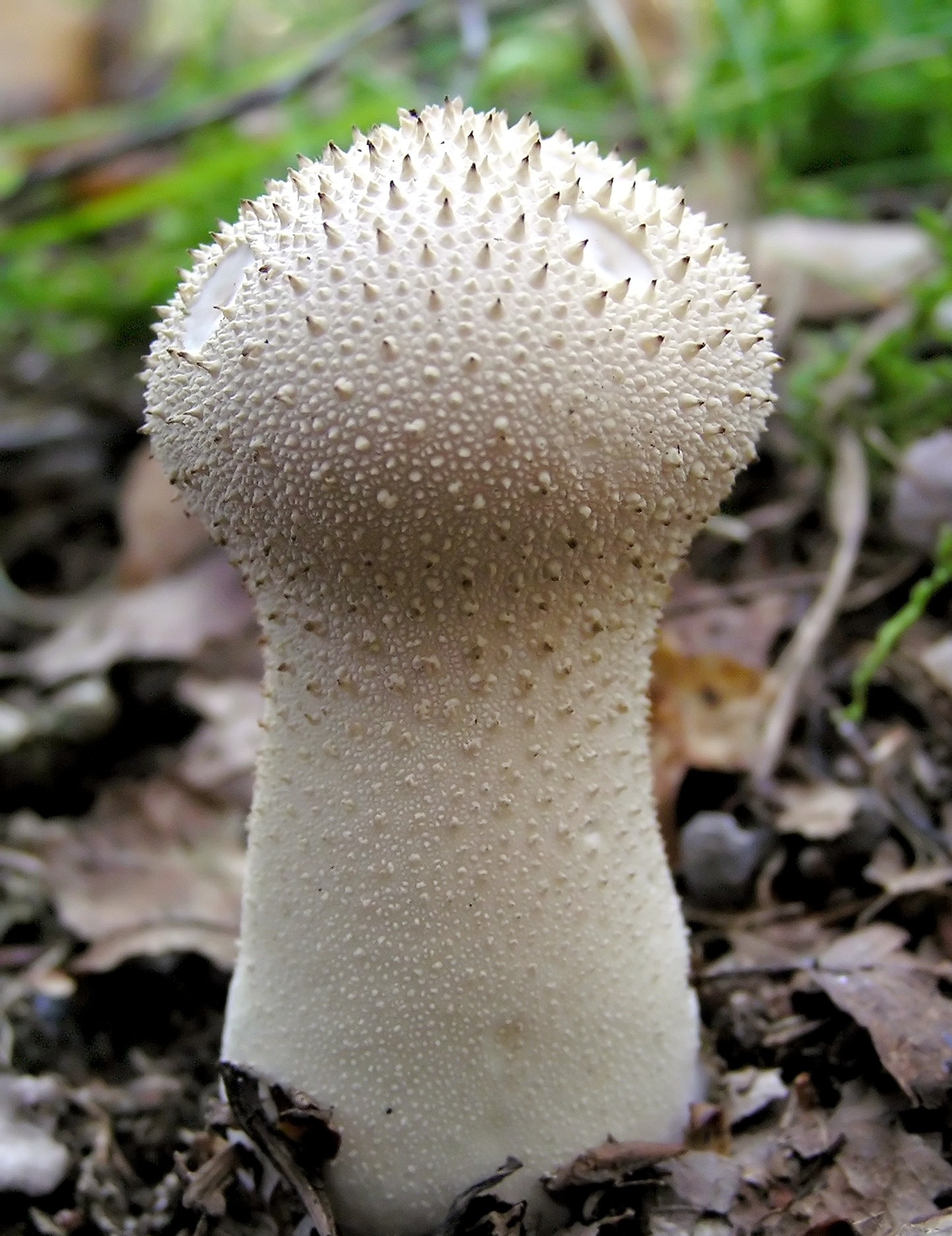
- Lycoperdon perlatum

Scientific classification
- Kingdom: Fungi
- Division: Basidiomycota
- Class: Agaricomycetes
- Order: Agaricales
- Family: Lycoperdaceae
- Genus: Lycoperdon

Type species
- Lycoperdon perlatum Pers. (1794)

Synonyms
- Sufa Adans. (1763); Priapus Raf. (1808); Cerophora Raf.(1814); Utraria Quél. (1873); Bovistella Morgan (1892); Calvatiella C.H.Chow (1936); Capillaria Velen. (1947); Handkea Kreisel (1989); Lycoperdon subgen. Bovistella (Morgan) Jeppson & E.Larss. (2008); Lycoperdon subgen. Utraria (Quél.) Jeppson & E.Larss. (2008)

= Lycoperdon =

Genus of fungi

Lycoperdon is a genus of puffball mushrooms. The genus has a widespread distribution and contains about 50 species. In general, it contains the smaller species such as the pear-shaped puffball and the gem-studded puffball. It was formerly classified within the now-obsolete order Lycoperdales, as the type genus which, following a restructuring of fungal taxonomy brought about by molecular phylogeny, has been split. Lycoperdon is now placed in the family Agaricaceae of the order Agaricales.

The scientific name has been created with Greek words (lycos meaning wolf and perdomai meaning to fart) and based on several European dialects in which the mushroom name sounds like wolf-farts.

Most species are edible, ranging from mild to tasting distinctly of shrimp.

== Species ==
- Lycoperdon caudatum (Syn. Lycoperdon pedicellatum) J.Schröt.
- Lycoperdon curtisii
- Lycoperdon echinatum Pers.
- Lycoperdon ericaceum (Syn. Lycoperdon muscorum)
- Lycoperdon ericaceum, var. subareolatum
- Lycoperdon lambinonii Demoulin 1972
- Lycoperdon lividum (Syn. Lycoperdon spadiceum) Pers. 1809
- Lycoperdon mammiforme Pers. 1801
- Lycoperdon marginatum (Syn. Lycoperdon candidum) Vittadini
- Lycoperdon molle
- Lycoperdon nigrescens (Syn. Lycoperdon foetidum) Bonord
- Lycoperdon norvegicum Demoulin 1971
- Lycoperdon ovoidisporum
- Lycoperdon perlatum (Syn. Lycoperdon gemmatum)
- Lycoperdon pratense
- Lycoperdon pyriforme Schaeff. 1774
- Lycoperdon pulcherrimum Berk. & M.A. Curtis
- Lycoperdon rupicola
- Lycoperdon subincarnatum
- Lycoperdon subumbrinum
- Lycoperdon umbrinum

== See also ==
- List of Agaricales genera
- List of Agaricaceae genera
