= Gleba =

Spore-bearing part of certain fungi

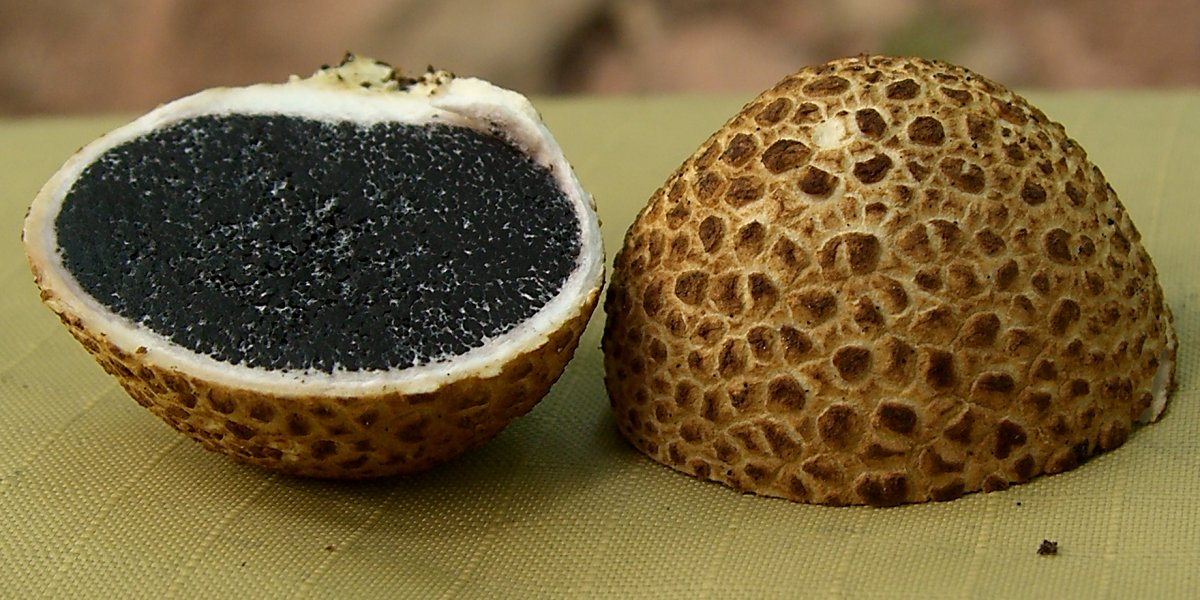
The gleba of the "common earthball" (Scleroderma citrinum) has a dark color.

Gleba (/ˈɡliːbə/, from Latin glaeba, glēba, "lump") is the fleshy spore-bearing inner mass of certain fungi such as the puffball or stinkhorn.

The gleba is a solid mass of spores, generated within an enclosed area within the sporocarp. The continuous maturity of the sporogenous cells leave the spores behind as a powdery mass that can be easily blown away. The gleba may be sticky or it may be enclosed in a case (peridiole).

It is a tissue usually found in an angiocarpous fruit-body, especially gasteromycetes. Angiocarpous fruit-bodies usually consist of fruit enclosed within a covering that does not form a part of itself; such as the filbert covered by its husk, or the acorn seated in its cupule. The presence of gleba can be found in earthballs and puffballs. The gleba consists of mycelium and basidia and may also contain capillitium threads.

Gleba found on the fruit body of species in the family Phallaceae is typically gelatinous, often fetid-smelling, and deliquescent (becoming liquid from the absorption of water). It is formed on the exterior face of the cap or the upper part of the fruit body. The foul smell helps to attract insects that help disperse the spores. Chemicals that contribute to the odor include methylmercaptan and hydrogen sulfide.

A subgleba is a "sterile, filamentous or chambered tissue which supports the gleba".
