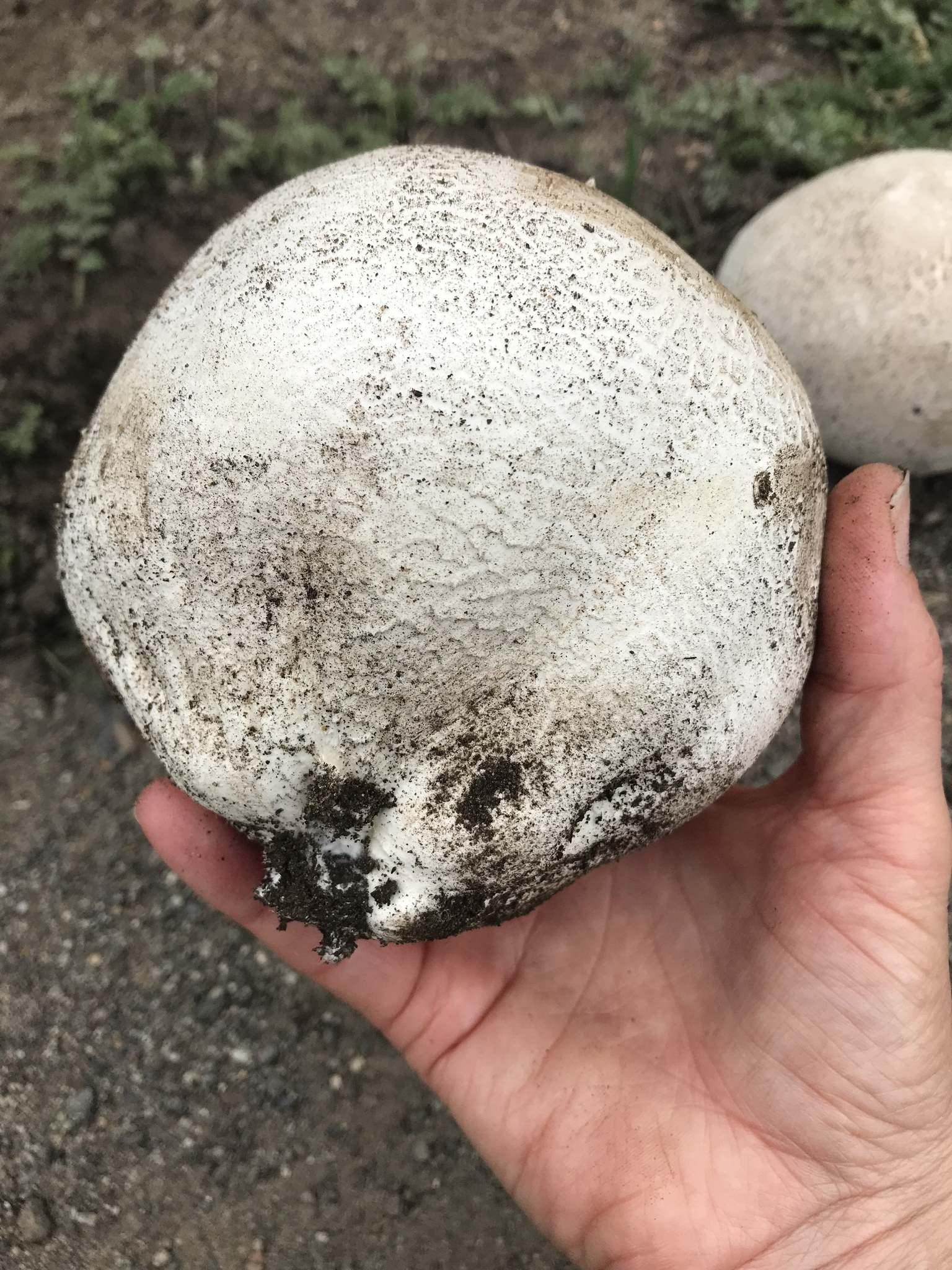

Scientific classification
- Kingdom: Fungi
- Division: Basidiomycota
- Class: Agaricomycetes
- Order: Agaricales
- Family: Agaricaceae
- Genus: Calvatia
- Species: C. pachyderma

Binomial name
- Calvatia pachyderma (Peck) Morgan, 1890

Synonyms
- Lycoperdon pachydermum (Peck, 1882); Langermannia pachyderma (Kreisel, 1962); Calvatia pachydera Gastropila fragilis (Lév., 1844) Homrich & J.E.Wright (1973)

= Calvatia pachyderma =

Thick-skinned puffball

Species of fungus

Calvatia pachyderma
- Mycological characteristics
- Glebal hymenium
- Edibility is choice or inedible

Calvatia pachyderma, also known as the elephant-skin puffball or thick-skinned puffball, is a species of edible fungus. This mid-sized, spring-fruiting puffball is known from relatively dry, open places near human settlements. The appropriate binomial name, taxonomic placement, and geographic distribution "have been much debated and are the subject of controversy".

== Taxonomy ==
This puffball was described as Lycoperdon pachydermum by Charles Horton Peck in 1882 from a type specimen collected in Arizona by C. G. Pringle. The species name "pachy-derm" means "thick skin", same as the obsolete order of mammals, Pachydermata, which included elephants and hippos.

In 1992, German mycologist Hanns Kreisel placed it in genus Calvatia sect. Gastropila, along with Calvatia pilula. According to Kreisel, both C. pachyderma and C. pilula are characterized by "Endoperidium thick, spongy; exoperidium thin, smooth. Capillitium with small pits. Subgleba none. Mature gleba olivaceous to brown."

=== Potential synonymy with G. fragilis ===
Gastropila fragilis was first described by French mycologist Joseph-Henri Léveillé as Mycenastrum fragile in 1844. Léveillé's M. fragile had several intermediate taxonomic placements before María H. Homrich and Jorge E. Wright assigned it the genus Gastropila in 1973.

According to some sources, Calvatia pachyderma and Gastropila fragilis are synonymous, which was argued as early as 1915 by Curtis Gates Lloyd but specifically debunked by María H. Homrich and Jorge Eduardo Wright in 1974. Mycobank currently holds that Calvatia pilula (Kreisel, 1992)—not C. pachyderma—is a synonym of G. fragilis. Further complicating matters, Lloyd (followed by others) claimed that Andrew Price Morgan's 1890 species description was not, in fact, the same as described by Peck, but rather Morgan was describing Calvatia polygonia.

== Description ==
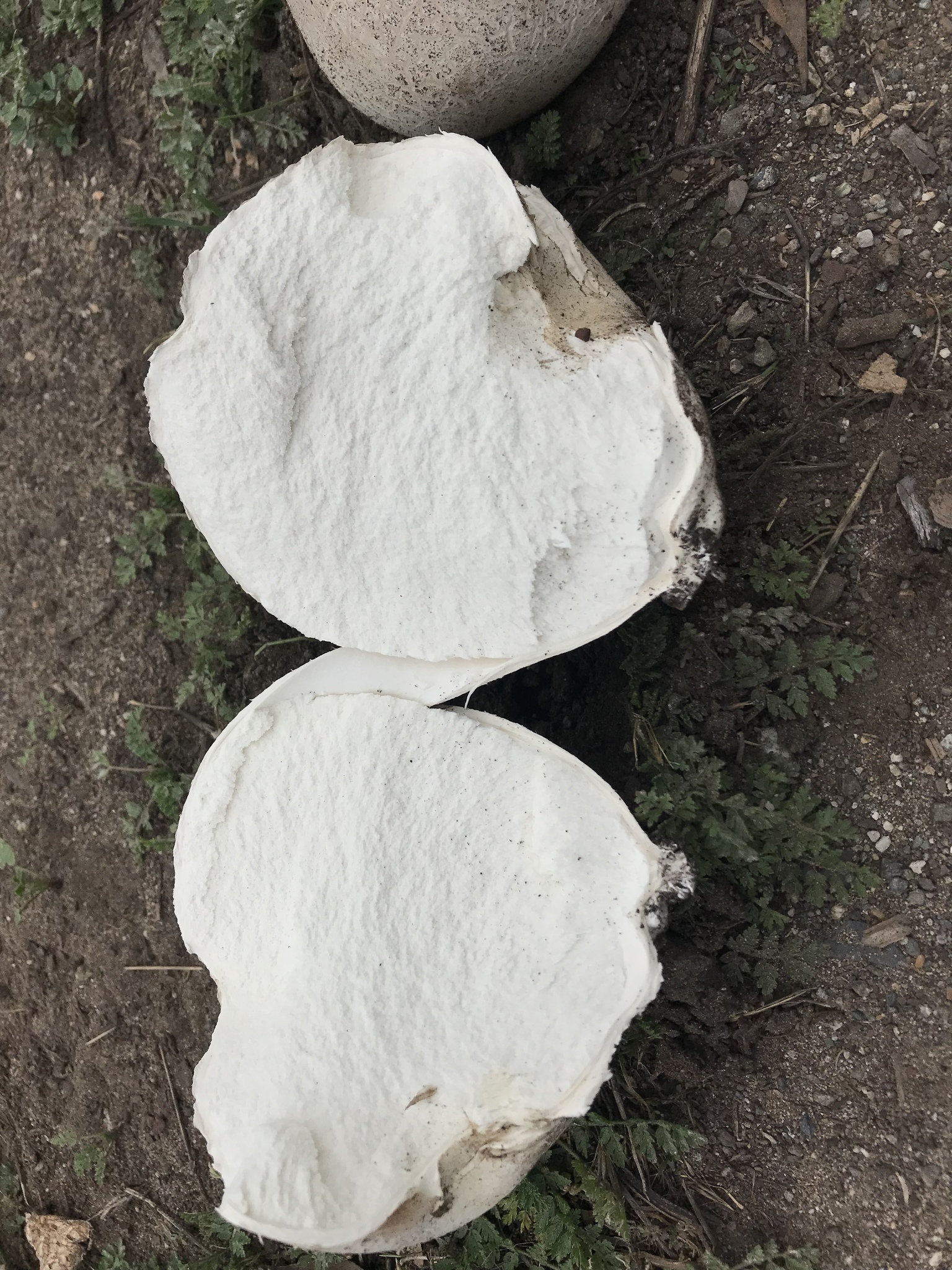
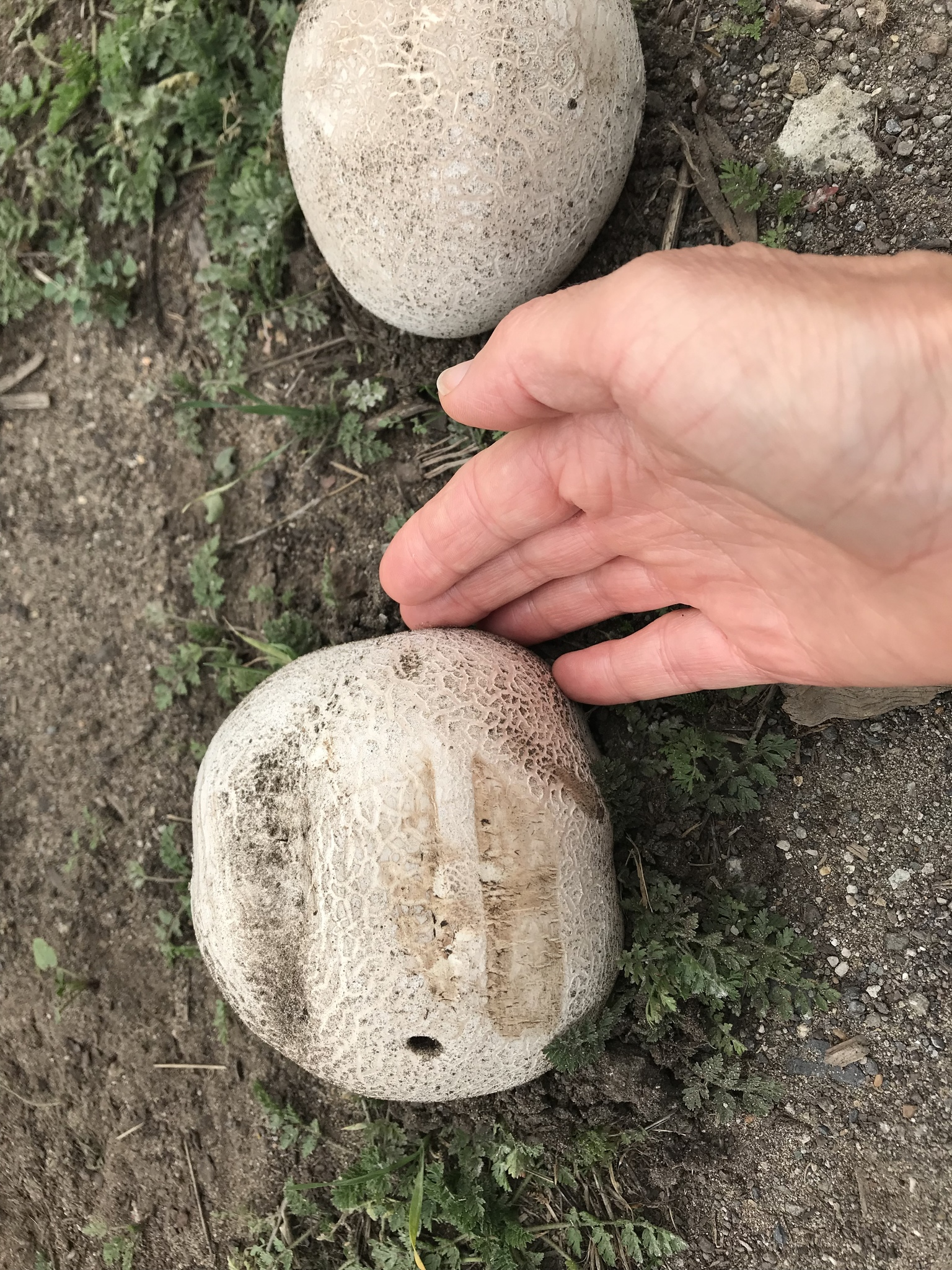
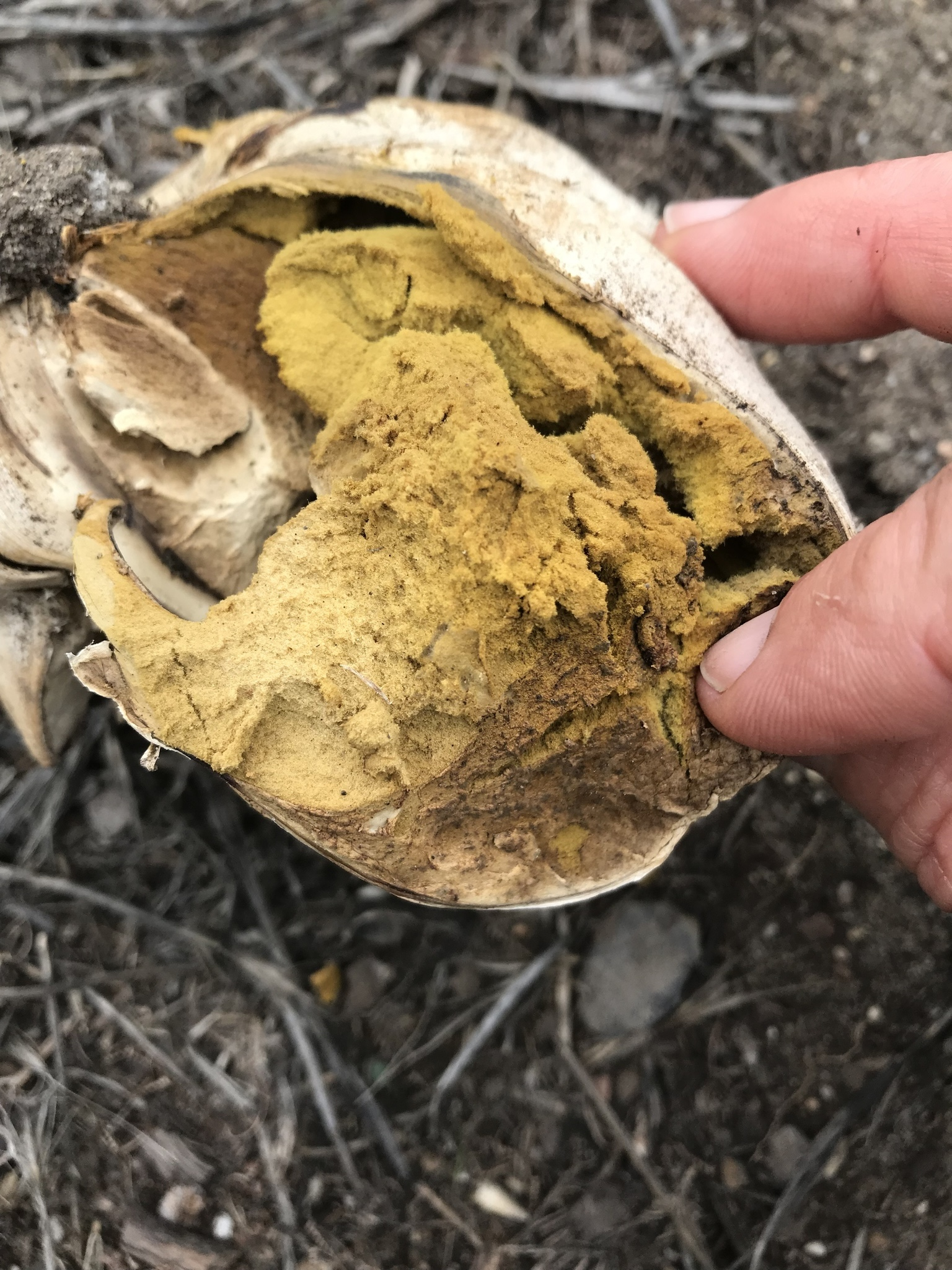

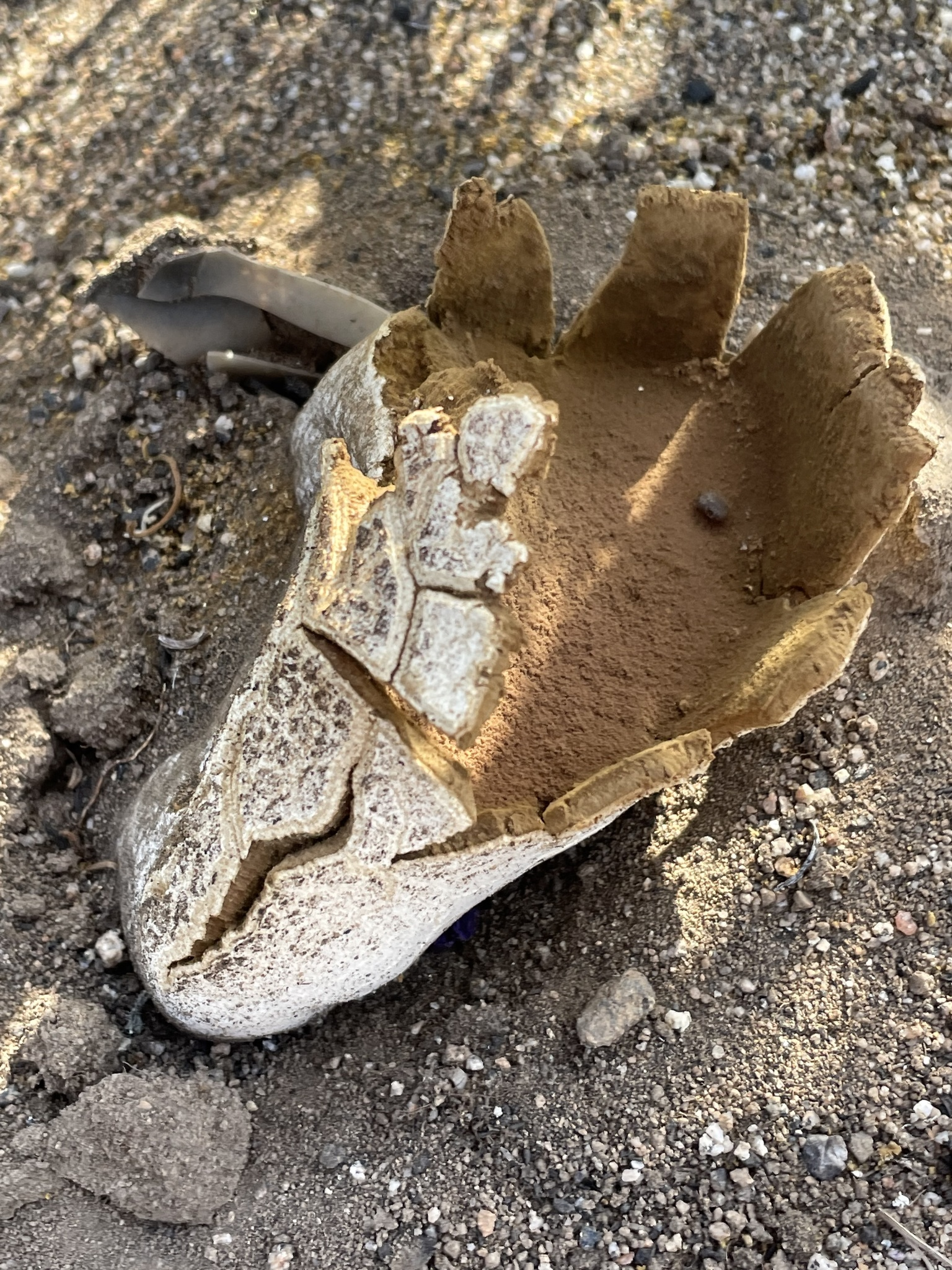
When young, C. pachyderma is considered a choice edible puffball mushroom. It becomes inedible after it sporulates.

In 1882, Peck described this species as "Subglobose, four to six inches in diameter, the radicating base somewhat pointed, the external peridium thin, smooth, whitish, the upper part cracking into small angular persistent spot-like scales or areas, the inner peridium thick, sub corky, somewhat brittle, the upper part at length breaking up into irregular fragments; capillitium and spores ochraceous-brown, the filaments long, flexuous, somewhat branched, .0003 of an inch spores subglobose or broadly elliptical, .0002-.00025 of an inch long. Arizona, June. Pringle. This is a singular species of Lycoperdon, belonging to the section Bovistoides, but having the peridium of unusual thickness. It is also apparently destitute of any cellular base, in which respect it approaches the genus Bovista, but the character of the threads of the capillitium points to Lycoperdon as its proper genus."

=== Size, shape, and color ===
The thick-skinned puffball sometimes known as Calvatia pachyderma is a mid-size puffball, with specimens usually measuring between 5–20 cm (2.0–7.9 in) in diameter with a "very thick" outer wall.

This puffball is not always spherical and tends to be wider than taller, and is sometimes shaped like a turnip, with tiny "rootlets" (actually mycelium) connecting it to the substrate. Initially white or whitish, as it expands it can become various shades of gray or brown and develop a texture described as "scaly or more often like cracked mud." As it moves past the edible stage toward the inedible spore-dispersing brown-dust explosion stage, the exterior skin (peridium) may begin to spontaneously peel back, sometimes ultimately fracturing in a way that superficially resembles an earthstar and that may leave behind a "shallow cup-shaped base".

=== Peridium and gleba ===
The "skin" of a puffball is called the peridium; the "flesh" is called the gleba. One review of North American gasteromycetes described C. pachyderma as having "Peridium single, or at least not separable into two distinct layers, thick; gleba bright olivaceous."

=== Spores ===
The spores of this fungus are described as ochraceous-brown or "soft, yellowish, golden brown to dark olive-brown". They appear "entirely smooth" when viewed under a microscope.

=== Similar species ===
It can resemble Mycenastrum corium and Scleroderma polyrhizum.

== Habitat and distribution ==
According to Kreisel, "Most species of Calvatia live in dry or mesophilic grassland, in arctic-alpine meadows, or in semi-desertic vegetation, some in gardens and cultivated soils. Only a few species occur in forests and other shady places." According to American mycologist David Arora, C. pachyderma is often found in "open, cultivated, and arid places". The thick-skinned puffball is primarily a spring mushroom (in the Northern Hemisphere), but also can be found at the beginning of the rainy season in the fall. It may appear as a one-off or in small groupings, sometimes in fairy rings. This puffball, and/or its almost indistinguishably similar close cousins, often grows in or near grass and/or along compacted trails.

In California, C. pachyderma is locally and/or seasonally common along the coast and the lower elevations of the Sierra Nevada mountain range. In Arizona, C. pachyderma is found in "mid to higher elevations" in Great Basin conifer woodland and Madrean evergreen woodland habitats. In western North America, Calvatia pachyderma may be mistaken for Calvatia booniana or Calvatia craniiformis. The skin of C. booniana breaks up in "polygonal or irregular-shaped patches" while C. pachyderma often develops vertical/longitudinal cracks at the "apical portions of the gasterocarp" and then pulls away from the gleba in fairly large plates. C. craniiformis is usually smaller than C. pachyderma, and the skin is thin and delicate. Mycenastrum corium also has some similar features but mature spores are red-brown or dark-brown, whereas C. pachyderma spores are yellow-brown or olive-brown.

Similar mushrooms that are contended, in some papers, and disputed in others, to be the same species, have been found in "high altitudes of Iran and Nepal," South Africa, Russia, Bulgaria, Turkmenistan, Chile, et al.

== See also ==
- Calvatia bovista
- Calvatia gigantea
- Bovista plumbea
- Calbovista subsculpta
- Mycenastrum corium
- Langermannia
