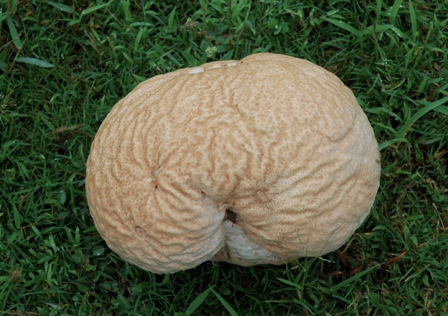

Scientific classification
- Kingdom: Fungi
- Division: Basidiomycota
- Class: Agaricomycetes
- Order: Agaricales
- Family: Agaricaceae
- Genus: Calvatia
- Species: C. craniiformis

Binomial name
- Calvatia craniiformis (Schwein.) Fr. ex De Toni (1888)

Synonyms
- Bovista craniiformis Schwein. (1832); Calvatia craniiformis (Schwein.) Fr. (1849); Calvatia craniformis (orthographic variant)

= Calvatia craniiformis =

Species of puffball fungus

Calvatia craniiformis
- Mycological characteristics
- Glebal hymenium
- No distinct cap
- Hymenium attachment is not applicable
- Lacks a stipe
- Spore print is yellow-brown to olive-brown
- Ecology is saprotrophic or mycorrhizal
- Edibility is edible or inedible

Calvatia craniiformis, (Note: Calvatia craniformis is an orthographic variant spelling.) commonly known as the brain puffball or the skull-shaped puffball, is a species of puffball fungus in the family Agaricaceae. It is found in Asia, Australia, and North America, where it grows on the ground in open woods. Its name, derived from the same Latin root as cranium, alludes to its resemblance to an animal's brain. The skull-shaped fruit body is 8–20 cm (3–8 in) broad by 6–20 cm (2–8 in) tall and white to tan. Initially smooth, the skin (peridium) develops wrinkles and folds as it matures, cracking and flaking with age. The peridium eventually sloughs away, exposing a powdery yellow-brown to greenish-yellow spore mass (the gleba). The puffball is edible when the gleba is still white and firm, before it matures to become yellow-brown and powdery. Mature specimens have been used in the traditional or folk medicines of China, Japan, and the Ojibwe as a hemostatic or wound dressing agent. Several bioactive compounds have been isolated and identified from the brain puffball.

== Taxonomy ==
The species was first described as Bovista craniiformis by Lewis David de Schweinitz in 1832. Elias Fries transferred it to the then newly circumscribed genus Calvatia in 1849, setting Calvatia craniiformis as the type and only species. (Note: Index Fungorum indicates that although this name is invalid according to Article 33.1 of the International Code of Nomenclature for algae, fungi, and plants, it is a conserved name.) Scott Bates and colleagues suggest that the name is synonymous with Lycoperdon delicatum published by Miles Joseph Berkeley and Moses Ashley Curtis in 1873 (not the L. delicatum published by Berkeley in 1854), as is Lycoperdon missouriense published by William Trelease in 1891. The form C. craniiformis f. gardneri, published by Yosio Kobayasi in 1932 (originally Lycoperdon gardneri Berk. 1875), since been elevated to the distinct species Calvatia gardneri.

In their 1962 monograph on North American Calvatia, mycologists Sanford Myron Zeller and Alexander H. Smith set C. craniiformis as the type species of the stirps (a grouping of related species) Craniiformis, containing species with a large sterile base and a persistent cottony gleba. Other species they included in this stirps were C. umbrina, C. diguetti, C. lycoperdoides, C. rubroflava, C. ochrogleba, C. excipuliformis (since transferred by some authorities to Handkea), and C. elata.

Calvatia craniiformis is commonly known as the "brain-shaped puffball" or the "skull-shaped puffball". The specific epithet craniiformis derives from the Ancient Greek words cranion, meaning "brain", and forma, "a form".

== Description ==
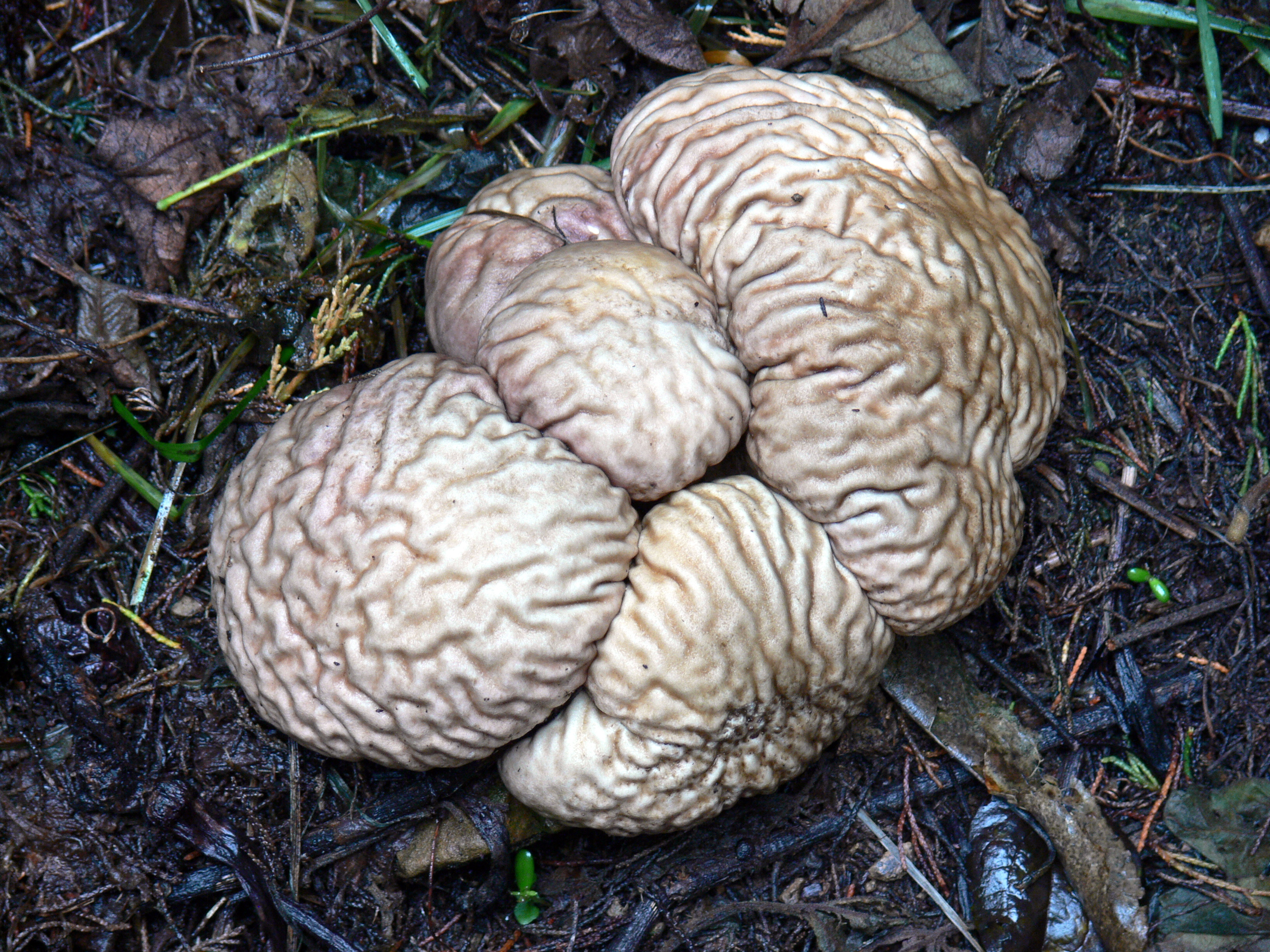
Cluster of fruit bodies found in New Zealand

The fruit bodies of Calvatia craniiformis grow to dimensions of 6–20 cm (2.4–7.9 in) tall by 8–20 cm (3.1–7.9 in) wide, and have a form ranging from pear-shaped, to flattened-spherical, to obovate (roughly egg-shaped), to tunicate (like an inverted cone). At the bottom is a thick, often crumpled base attached to a cord-like rhizomorph, which is often encrusted with surrounding soil. The rhizomorphs are well developed, and when cut into longitudinal section, reveal three distinct tissues: an outer cortex, a subcortical layer, and a central core. The thin and fragile exoperidium (the outer layer of "skin") is whitish-gray to gray, and initially smooth before becoming areolate (divided by cracks into discrete areas). The base extends up one-third to one-halfway into the puffball (where it becomes the columnella) tapering to a point. The gleba is initially whitish, and then yellow-green, and finally brownish-green in older specimens with mature spores.

Spores are spherical, hyaline (translucent), and measure 2.5–3.4 μm in diameter. They are thick-walled with a short pedicel (a tubelike extension), and are ornamented with tiny spines (verrucae) that are roughly equidistant from each other. Capillitial threads are long, hyaline, and branched, measuring 2.4–4 μm thick. They are septate and occasionally have pits on their walls. The exoperidium comprises thick-walled, inflated hyphae mixed with sphaerocysts (spherical cells), while the endoperidium is made of tightly interwoven, thick-walled hyphae. In the rhizomorphs, the hyphae in the central core are several times as thick as those in the surrounding subcortex.

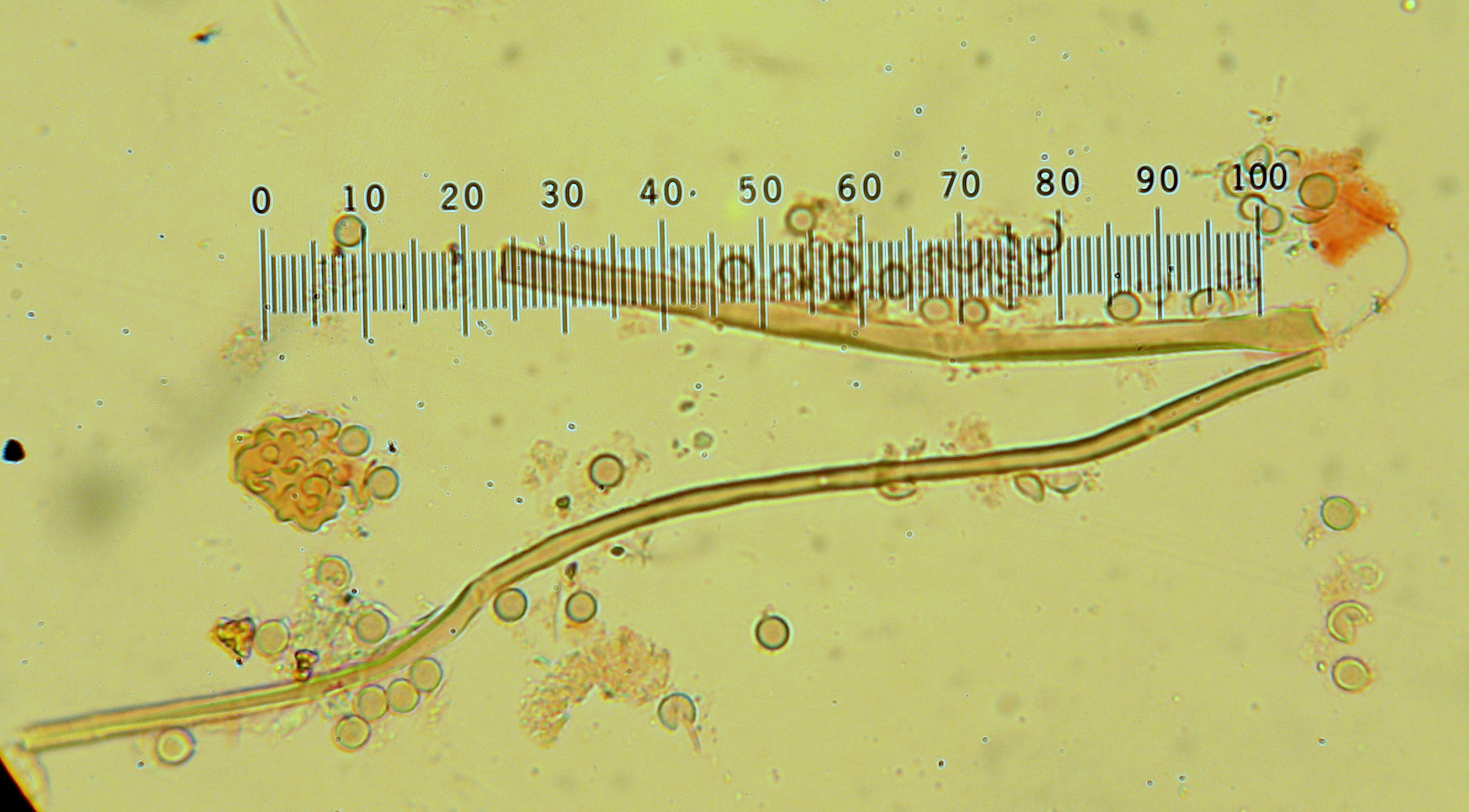
Spores and capillitial threads

Using light microscopy, the spores of Calvatia craniiformis are generally indistinguishable from those of C. rubroflava and C. gigantea; electron microscopy reveals that each has distinctive spore ornamentation. C. craniiformis features small, well-separated verrucae (wartlike projections) up to 0.2 μm tall with rounded tips. In comparison, C. gigantea has larger verrucae (up to 0.4 μm tall) that are more irregularly arranged.

=== Development ===
Fruit bodies arise from the tips or the lateral branches or rhizomorphs. New fruit bodies are made of an exterior of thick hyphae similar to those found in the rhizomorph core; in contrast, the hyphae of the interior originate from the puffball's core. Unlike some other puffball species, the peridium does not differentiate into a distinct exoperidium and endoperidium; rather, the outer layer develops the features of a pseudoparenchyma (a tightly organised tissue where the tightly packed cells resemble plant parenchyma) as the radial and tangential hyphae become interweaved. In time, the peridium dries and falls off in flakes to expose the underlying gleba.

=== Similar species ===
The brain-like surface folds and mature olive-brown gleba are characteristic of Calvatia craniiformis, but younger puffballs that have not yet developed these characteristics may be difficult to identify to species. Another edible puffball, C. cyathiformis (lilac puffball) grows to similar dimensions but has gleba that is purple-brown when mature. Calvatia fragilis is smaller and pink or purple mature gleba. C. bicolor is a smaller, rounder puffball that could be confused with younger specimens of C. craniiformis, but the former species has more coarsely ornamented spores, and lacks a distinct subgleba. Handkea utriformis is roughly similar in appearance to C. craniiformis, but unlike the latter it develops a cavernous opening to reveal an olive-brown gleba, and has distinct slits in its capillitial threads.

== Uses ==
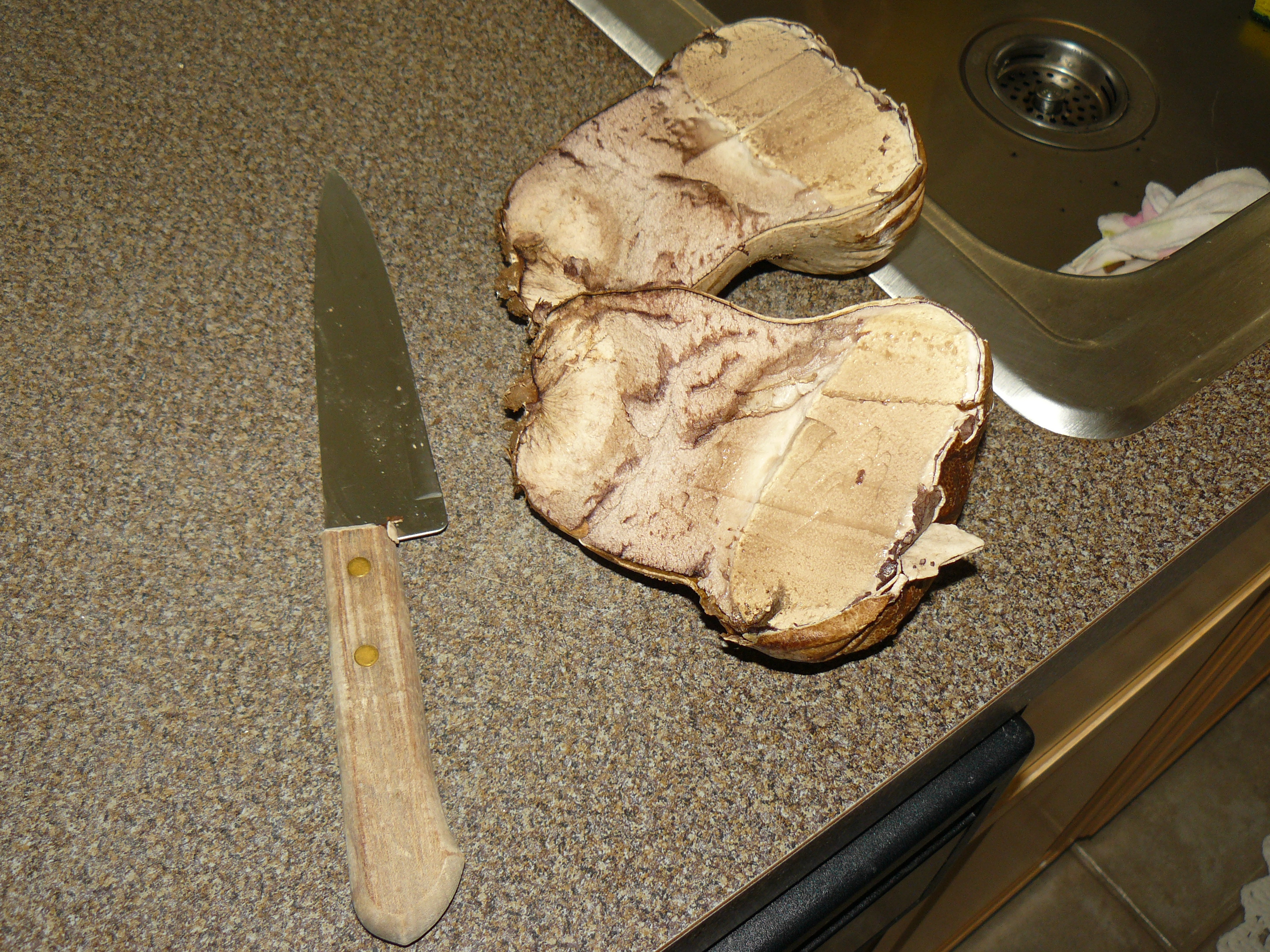
Calvatia craniiformis is edible when the gleba is firm and white, unlike the pictured specimen.

Calvatia craniiformis is an edible species. Young puffballs with a firm, white gleba have a mild odor and pleasant taste. Early 20th-century mycologist Charles McIlvaine noted over a century ago that "the slightest change to yellow makes it bitter." Versatile in cooking, the puffball absorbs flavors well.

In the United States, the Ojibwe used the powdery gleba as a hemostatic agent to staunch the flow of nosebleeds: the spore powder was inhaled through the nostrils. It is now known that this practice can lead to the pulmonary disease lycoperdonosis, which causes symptoms similar to pneumonia. It is also used as a hemostatic agent in Chinese and Japanese folk medicines.

== Distribution and ecology ==
In Asia, it has been recorded from China, India, Indonesia, Japan, Malaysia, and South Korea. The brain puffball has been recorded from Australia. In North America, its range includes the eastern and southern United States, and Mexico. In Michigan, it is one of the few macrofungi found regularly in black locust plantations.

Brain puffballs grow singly or in groups in fields and open woods, hardwood forests, and wet areas. Although Calvatia craniiformis is generally considered a saprobic species, in controlled laboratory conditions, an ectomycorrhizae between the fungus and American sweetgum (Liquidambar styraciflua) was reported in a 1966 publication. A Chinese study showed that C. craniifromis would readily form mycorrhiza with poplar seedlings on unsterilized, but not on sterilized soil. Later research was unable to establish any similar association between C. craniiformis and Pinus ponderosa.

Fruit bodies serve as a food source for several species of flies, and have been recorded as occasional food of the pleasing fungus beetle Tritoma unicolor.

== Research ==
Extracts of the puffball have strong antitumor activity in mouse models attributable to protein-bound polysaccharides, the compounds calvatan, craniformin, and a tautomer of rubroflavin. Calvatan is thought to act by stimulating the immune response, rather than by killing cells. Craniformin, originally reported in 1997, is an azoformamide compound. Three sterol compounds have been identified from the fungus: ergosta-4,6,8(14), 22-tetraene-3-one, ergosta-7,22-diene-3-ol, and ergosterol peroxide.

Three azo- and azoxyformamides compounds have been isolated and identified from the puffball and tested for their ability to inhibit the growth of plants: 4-methoxybenzene-1-ONN-azoxyformamide, 4-methoxybenzene-1-azoformamide, and 4-hydroxybenzene-1-azoformamide. Only the first compound was significantly inhibitory, suggesting that the presence of the azoxy moiety is required for growth inhibition.
