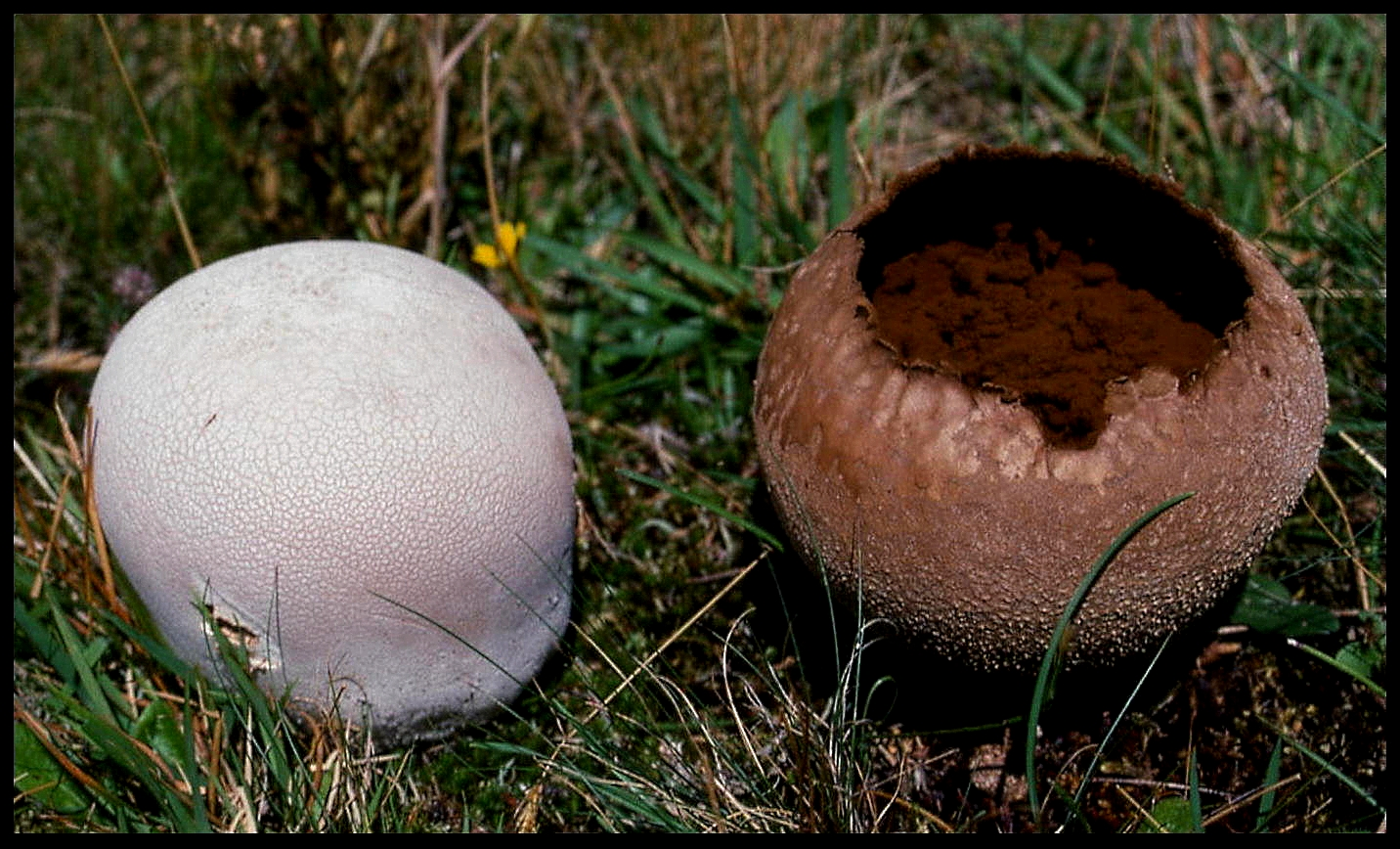

Scientific classification
- Kingdom: Fungi
- Division: Basidiomycota
- Class: Agaricomycetes
- Order: Agaricales
- Family: Lycoperdaceae
- Genus: Handkea
- Species: H. utriformis

Binomial name
- Handkea utriformis (Bull.) Kreisel (1989)

Synonyms
- Calvatia utriformis (Bull.) Jaap. (1918); Lycoperdon utriforme (Bull.) (1790)

= Handkea utriformis =

Species of fungus

Handkea utriformis
- Mycological characteristics
- Glebal hymenium
- No distinct cap
- Hymenium attachment is not applicable
- Lacks a stipe
- Spore print is brown
- Ecology is saprotrophic
- Edibility is edible

Handkea utriformis, synonymous with Lycoperdon utriforme, Lycoperdon caelatum or Calvatia utriformis, is a species of puffball in the family Lycoperdaceae. A rather large mushroom, it may reach dimensions of up to 25 cm (10 in) broad by 20 cm (8 in) tall. It is commonly known as the mosaic puffball, referencing the polygonal segments on the outer surface of the fruiting body as it matures.

Widespread in northern temperate zones, the species is found frequently on pastures and sandy heaths. It is edible when young, has antibiotic activity against a number of bacteria, and can bioaccumulate the trace metals copper and zinc to relatively high concentrations.

== Taxonomy ==
This puffball was originally described in 1790 by French botanist Jean Baptiste François Pierre Bulliard as Lycoperdon utriforme, and since then, has been variously placed in the genera Bovista, Lycoperdon, Calvatia, and Utraria. In 1989, German mycologist Hanns Kreisel described the genus Handkea to include species of Calvatia that had distinct microscopic features: Handkea species have a unique type of capillitium (coarse thick-walled hyphae in the gleba), with curvy slits instead of the usual pores. Although accepted by some authors, the genus concept has been rejected by others.

In the past, the species (when it was known as Calvatia utriformis) has been separated into three varieties (C. utriformis var. utriformis, C. utriformis var. hungarica and C. utriformis var. gruberi) based on differences in the ornamentation of the exoperidium (outer tissue layer of the wall, or peridium) and spores. However, a 1997 study of these characters revealed that the three varieties are not clearly demarcated. This study and others suggest that variations in the environmental conditions in which the specimens are grown can affect the development of these characteristics.

Phylogenetic analyses published in 2008 shows that Handkea may be grouped in a clade along with species from several other genera, including Lycoperdon, Vascellum, Morganella, Bovistella, and Calvatia. Published in the same year, another DNA analysis of the structure of ITS2 rDNA transcript confirmed that H. utriformis is closely related to Lycoperdon echinatum.

== Description ==
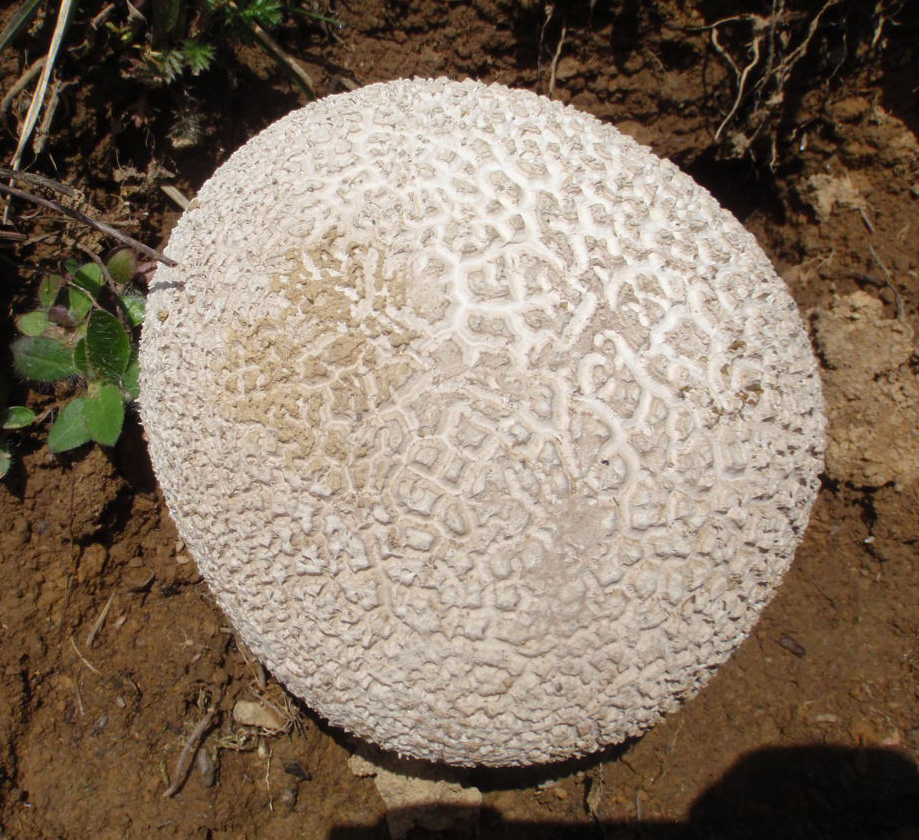
Specimen from Turkey

Like all puffballs, Handkea utriformis has a gasteroid basidiocarp, meaning the spores are produced internally, and are only released as the mature fruiting body ages and dries, or is broken. Young puffballs are typically 6 to 12 cm (2 1/2 to 4 1/2 in) across, white, or pale grey-brown; in maturity it may attain dimensions of 25 cm (10 in) broad by 20 cm (8 in) tall. The exoperidum is tomentose—densely covered with a layer of fine matted hairs. The species derives its common name "mosaic puffball" from the mosaic pattern across the top and sides that develops as the fruiting body matures and the outer wall (exoperidium) breaks up into polygonal patches.

The underside of the puffball is attached to the ground by a root-like assemblage of hyphae called a rhizomorph. It is squat in appearance and roughly pear-shaped, not usually taller than it is wide. The flesh (gleba, or spore-bearing mass) is white when young, but becomes brown and powdery upon maturity. The upper skin eventually disintegrates weeks or even months after the puffball's appearance, and the brown spores are released into the air; this process is often hastened by rain, or by being trodden on by cattle. Eventually, all that remains is the sterile cup-shaped base, which can sometimes hold water. This feature may have been the source of the specific epithet, as utrarius is Latin for ‘water carrier’.

=== Microscopic features ===
The spores of H. utriformis are roughly spherical, smooth, and thick-walled, with a single oil droplet. They have dimensions of 4.5–5.5 μm.

=== Similar species ===
A number of puffball species resemble H. utriformis, including Calvatia cyathiformis, Calvatia booniana, and Calvatia pachyderma. Calvatia cyathiformis has a purple-colored gleba with a smooth exoperidium; C. booniana has an exoperidium that resembles felt or has tufts of soft "hairs" like H. utriformis but does not have any stem and has a capillitium with rounded rather than sinuous pits; C. pachyderma has an exoperidium that is thicker and smoother than H. utriformis.

== Distribution and habitat ==
Handkea utriformis is widespread and frequent in northern temperate zones. It is found in Europe, continental Asia, Japan, eastern North America including Mexico, and South Africa. It has also been collected in Chile, and New Zealand. Growing alone or in small groups, it favors sandy open pastures, or heaths, and is often found in coastal regions. It typically fruits in summer through late autumn (July–November in the United Kingdom).

== Uses ==
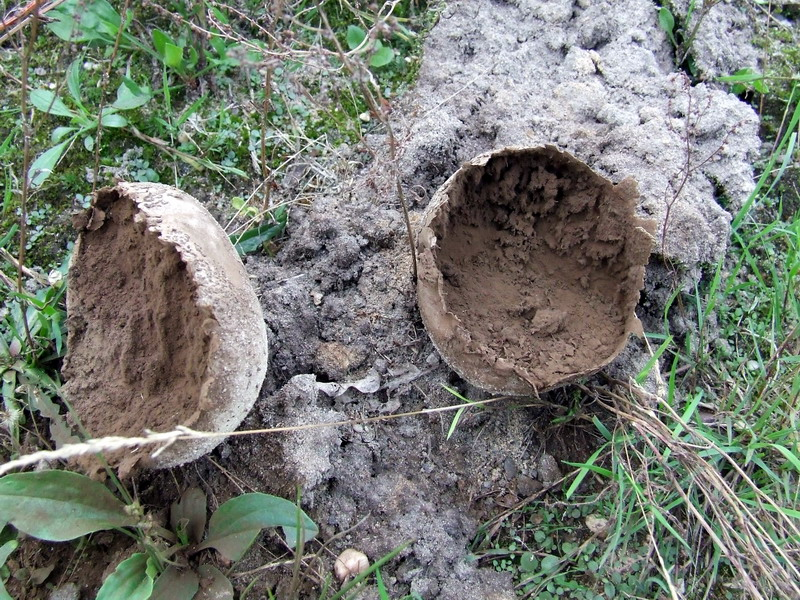
The gleba becomes dry and powdery in mature specimens.

This fairly large puffball is edible only when the spore-bearing flesh is young and white. It is said to lack texture, and the taste and odor of the young fruiting bodies are described as "not distinctive". A 2007 study of the fatty acid composition of various edible Lycoperdaceae species determined the lipid content of H. utriformis to be quite low, approximately 1.8% (wet weight). The fatty acid content was largely linoleic acid (42.4%), oleic acid (23%), palmitic acid (12.2%), and stearic acid (3.6%); 17 other fatty acids of various chain lengths and degrees of unsaturation contributed to the total fatty acid composition.

A 2005 study of the antimicrobial activity of several Lycoperdaceae revealed that Handkea utriformis has "significantly active" against a number of bacteria, including Bacillus subtilis, Escherichia coli, Klebsiella pneumoniae, Pseudomonas aeruginosa, Salmonella typhimurium, Staphylococcus aureus, Streptococcus pyogenes, and Mycobacterium smegmatis. On the other hand, H. utriformis has low antifungal activity against the species Candida albicans, Rhodotorula rubra, and Kluyveromyces fragilis.

A study of the copper and zinc concentrations in 28 different species of edible mushrooms showed that H. utriformis selectively bioaccumulated both copper (251.9 mg of copper per kilogram of mushroom) and zinc (282.1 mg Zn/kg mushroom) to higher levels than all other mushrooms tested. The authors note that although these trace elements are important nutritional requirements for humans, and that H. utriformis may be considered a good source of these elements, it is known that absorption of the elements (bioavailability) from mushrooms is "low due to limited absorption from the small intestine".
