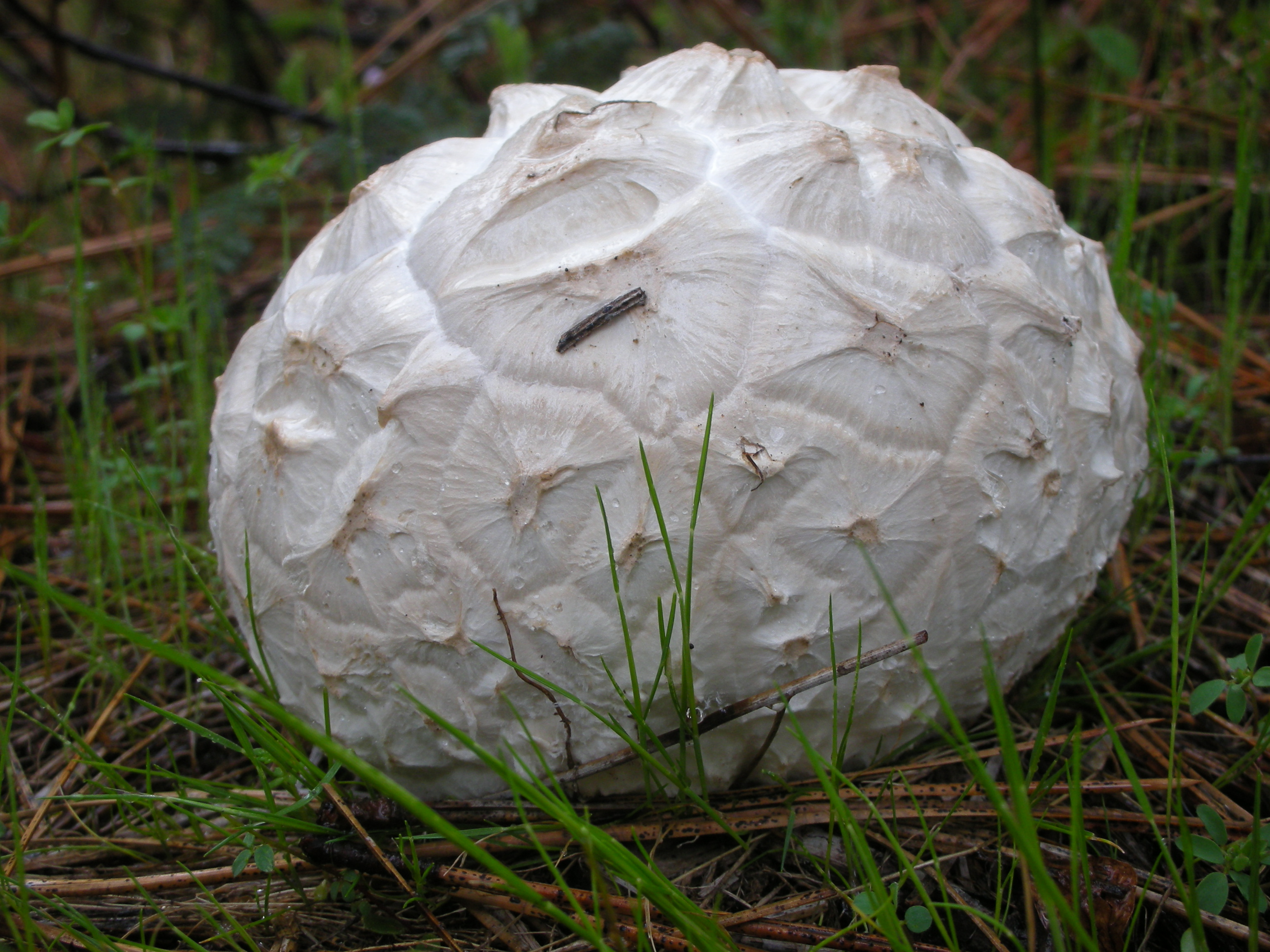

Scientific classification
- Kingdom: Fungi
- Division: Basidiomycota
- Class: Agaricomycetes
- Order: Agaricales
- Family: Agaricaceae
- Genus: Calbovista; Morse ex M.T.Seidl (1995)

Type species
- Calbovista subsculpta Morse ex M.T.Seidl (1995)

Synonyms
- Calbovista subsculpta Morse (1935); Calbovista subsculpta var. fumosa A.H.Sm. (1965)

= Calbovista =

Genus of fungi

Calbovista
- Mycological characteristics
- Glebal hymenium
- No distinct cap
- Hymenium attachment is not applicable
- Lacks a stipe
- Spore print is blackish-brown
- Ecology is saprotrophic
- Edibility is edible or inedible

Calbovista is a fungal genus containing the single species Calbovista subsculpta, commonly known as the sculptured puffball, sculptured giant puffball, and warted giant puffball. Although originally described as new to science by Elizabeth Eaton Morse in 1935, the species was not published validly until 60 years later. The species is named for its resemblance to Calvatia sculpta.

Calbovista subsculpta is more or less round with a diameter of up to 15 cm (6 in), white becoming brownish in age, and covered with shallow pyramid-shaped plates or scales. As the puffball matures, its insides become dark brown and powdery from mature spores. It can be usually distinguished from Calvatia sculpta by its less prominent pyramidal warts and microscopically by the antler-like branches of its capillitium (threadlike matter among the spores).

The species fruits singly or in groups along roads and in open woods at high elevations, from summer to autumn. It is common in the Rocky Mountains and Pacific Coast ranges of western North America. It is a good edible species while its interior flesh (the gleba) is still firm and white.

== Taxonomy ==
In her 1935 Mycologia article, American mycologist Elizabeth Eaton Morse noted the existence of an abundant and widely distributed puffball of the western United States that was commonly misidentified as Calvatia sculpta, although it differed from that species in having extensively branched capillitial threads. The puffball had characteristics that aligned it with several other taxa. The peridium was similar to those of Calvatia sculpta, Calvatia caelata (now known as Calvatia bovista), Scleroderma flavidum, and Scleroderma aurantium (now Scleroderma citrinum); the rooting base was similar to Bovistella; and the structure of the capillitial threads reminiscent of Bovista, Bovistella, and Mycenastrum. However, the new species had a unique combination of characteristics and did not fit neatly into any already-described genera. As a result, Morse circumscribed the new genus Calbovista to contain Calbovista sculpta. The type collection was made at Soda Springs, California in May 1934 at an elevation of 2,063 m (6,767 ft). Morse's publication of the genus was invalid because it lacked a description in Latin—a requirement of the International Code of Botanical Nomenclature that was implemented effective January 1, 1935. The genus and species were published validly with a Latin description by Michelle Seidl in 1995.

Alexander H. Smith described a variety, Calbovista subsculpta var. fumosa, in 1965, based on a collection he made in Kaniksu National Forest (northeastern Washington) in 1964. This variety, known only from the type locality, differs from the nominate variety in its grayish outer peridium and minute scales. Because it was based on an invalid genus, it too was invalid; it was later published correctly in 2012 with the full name and authority Calbovista subsculpta var. fumosa A.H.Sm. ex J.C.Coetzee & A.E.van Wyk.

Calbovista is usually classified in the family Lycoperdaceae, although the nomenclatural status of this group is unclear, as some authorities lump it into the Agaricaceae. By contrast, Sanford Myron Zeller placed Calbovista in Mycenastracae, a family erected by him in 1948 to contain Calbovista and Mycenastrum, two genera united by similarities in capillitial morphology. Mycenastraceae is not currently considered to have independent taxonomic significance and is folded into synonymy with the Agaricaceae.

The genus name Calbovista combines the parts cal, referring to the genus's puffball ally Calvatia, and bovista, alluding to the genus's similarity to Bovista and Bovistella. The specific epithet subsculpta refers to its resemblance to Calvatia sculpta, a species with which it had been frequently confused. Common names used to refer to the fungus include the sculptured puffball, sculptured giant puffball, and warted giant puffball.

== Description ==
The fruit bodies are irregularly top-shaped to roughly spherical, measuring 8–15 cm (3–6 in) wide and 6–9 cm (2 1/2–3 1/2 in) high. It has a two-layered peridium. The outer layer of the peridium (the exoperidium) is thick and leathery (except where it thins toward the base), measuring 5–10 mm (3/16–3/8 in) thick. It is divided into irregular three- to six-sided, low pyramids that are usually blunt, but sometimes pointed. The pyramids are 5–8 mm (3/16–5/16 in) thick. They have parallel markings, a feature Morse attributed to the differences in growth rate caused by variations in daytime and nighttime temperatures. The pyramid centers have short brownish hairs. The pyramids cover the entire peridium except for near the base, where it is smooth. Warts on the surface of young fruit bodies may be disproportionately thick.

The inner peridium is a thin shiny tissue that is depressed into areas demarcated by the pyramidal plates. The puffball base, which occupies about a third to a quarter of the bottom of the fruit body, consists of moderately-sized chambers that persist even after the gleba has matured and the spores have dispersed. The base can assume a purplish hue after weathering. The base is rooted into the soil with rhizomorphs. Initially white, the gleba turns color from yellow to golden brown to dark brown as the spores mature. As the gleba dries, the inner peridium dries and cracks, exposing the spore mass in cracks between the scales. The gleba is supported by a yellowish-brown to light brown subgleba. The flesh has no odor and a mild taste.

The spore print is white, turning brownish. The spherical spores measure 3–5 μm, including an outer covering (an epispore) of about 0.5 μm. Their surface texture ranges from smooth to faintly warted. They have an oil droplet and a translucent pedicel (a small stalk) up to 2.5 μm long. The basidia (spore-bearing cells) are club-shaped, four-spored, and measure 10–12.5 μm long by 5–7.5 μm wide. The capillitium comprises short, highly branched (resembling antlers) and entangled threads measuring 5–10 μm wide with walls up to 2.5 μm thick. The capillitial threads do not have septa.

Microscopy
Light micrograph of the characteristic antler-branched capillita	Electron micrograph of capillita and spores	The spores have a faintly warted surface and a pedicel.

=== Similar species ===
In the field, Calbovista puffballs are sometimes difficult to reliably distinguish from Calvatia sculpta. Although the latter species has prominent pyramidal warts, some specimens of Calbovista (especially young ones) may share this feature and the distinction between them becomes blurred. Microscopic differences can be used to tell the two species apart: Calvatia puffballs do not have a highly branched and entangled capillitium. Another lookalike, Mycenastrum corium, has a smooth peridium, a reduced or absent base, tends to split open in maturity into irregularly shaped sections, and has spiny capillitial threads. Calvatia subcretacea, also found in high elevations under conifers in western North America, has smaller fruit bodies, measuring up to 4 cm (1 1/2 in) high and 5 cm (2 in) wide. It has small pointed warts with gray tips. Calvatia booniana is a large puffball—up to 60 cm (24 in) in diameter—found in open pastures and grassy areas of the western U.S. that has flat polygonal scales on the outer peridium. In addition to its larger size, it differs from Calbovista in that it lacks a sterile base and its capillitia are less branched and have septa.

== Habitat and distribution ==
Calbovista is a saprobic species, decomposing dead plant material. Its fruit bodies grow singly, in groups, or occasionally in clusters. Fruiting occurs from April to August in areas with broken rocks mixed with soil, or in open coniferous forest at elevations ranging from 900 to 3,400 m (3,000 to 11,000 ft). Another usual habitat is on road sides. Calbovista is a common mountain puffball. Its distribution covers the Rocky Mountains and Pacific Coast ranges of the western U.S. On the eastern side of the Cascade Range, the puffball is often found growing under ponderosa pine. It has been collected from California, Colorado, Idaho, Washington, Wyoming, and Oregon. Its range extends north to British Columbia and Alaska. The puffball is often found by morel hunters in the spring, as it grows in similar habitats.

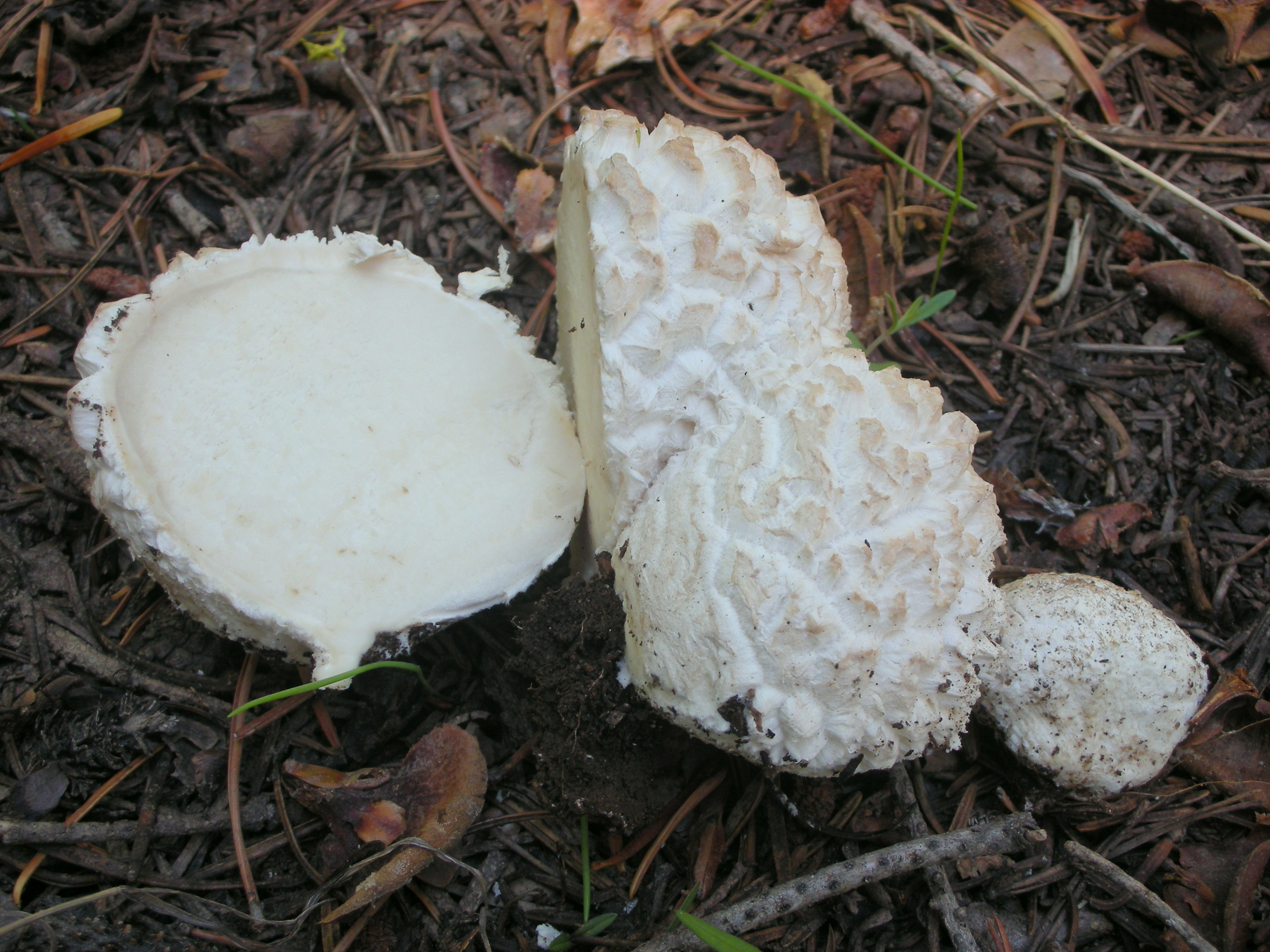
The interior gleba, still white and firm

== Uses ==
The puffballs are edible when the interior gleba is still firm and white.

== See also ==
- List of Agaricales genera
- List of Agaricaceae genera
