= Puffball =

Form type of fungus

- Mycological characteristics
- Glebal hymenium
- Cap is convex or indistinct
- Hymenium attachment is not applicable
- Lacks a stipe or is bare
- Spore print is blackish-brown to brown
- Ecology is saprotrophic
- Edibility is edible or inedible

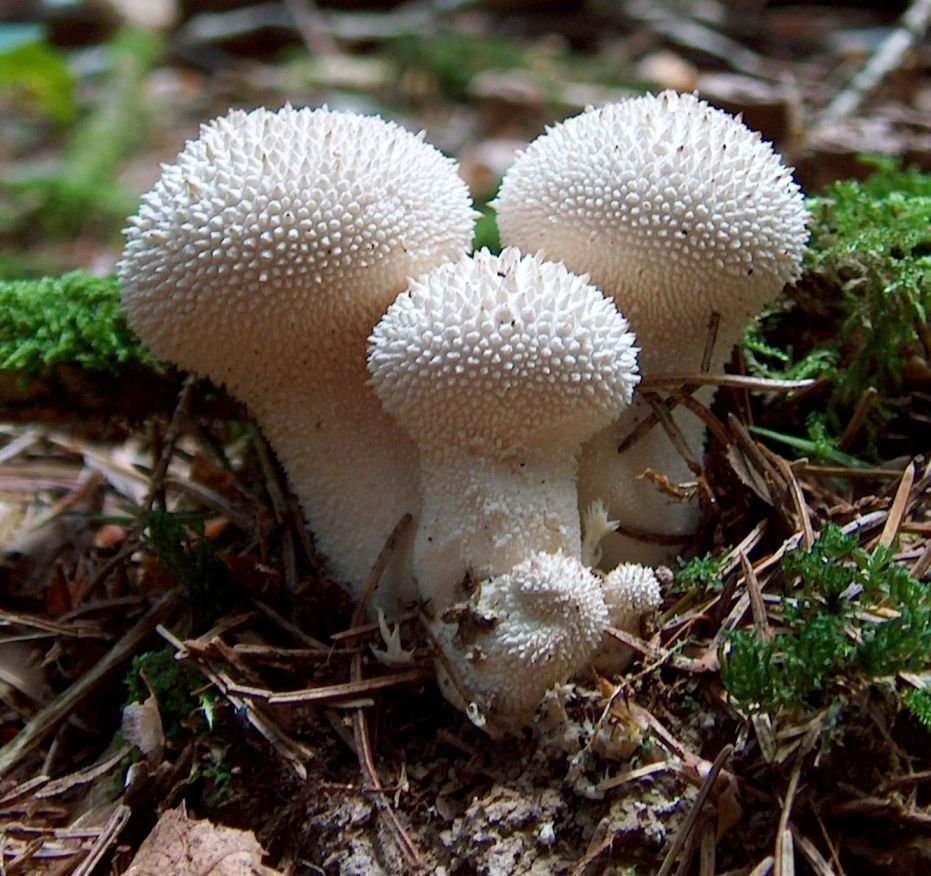
Lycoperdon perlatum

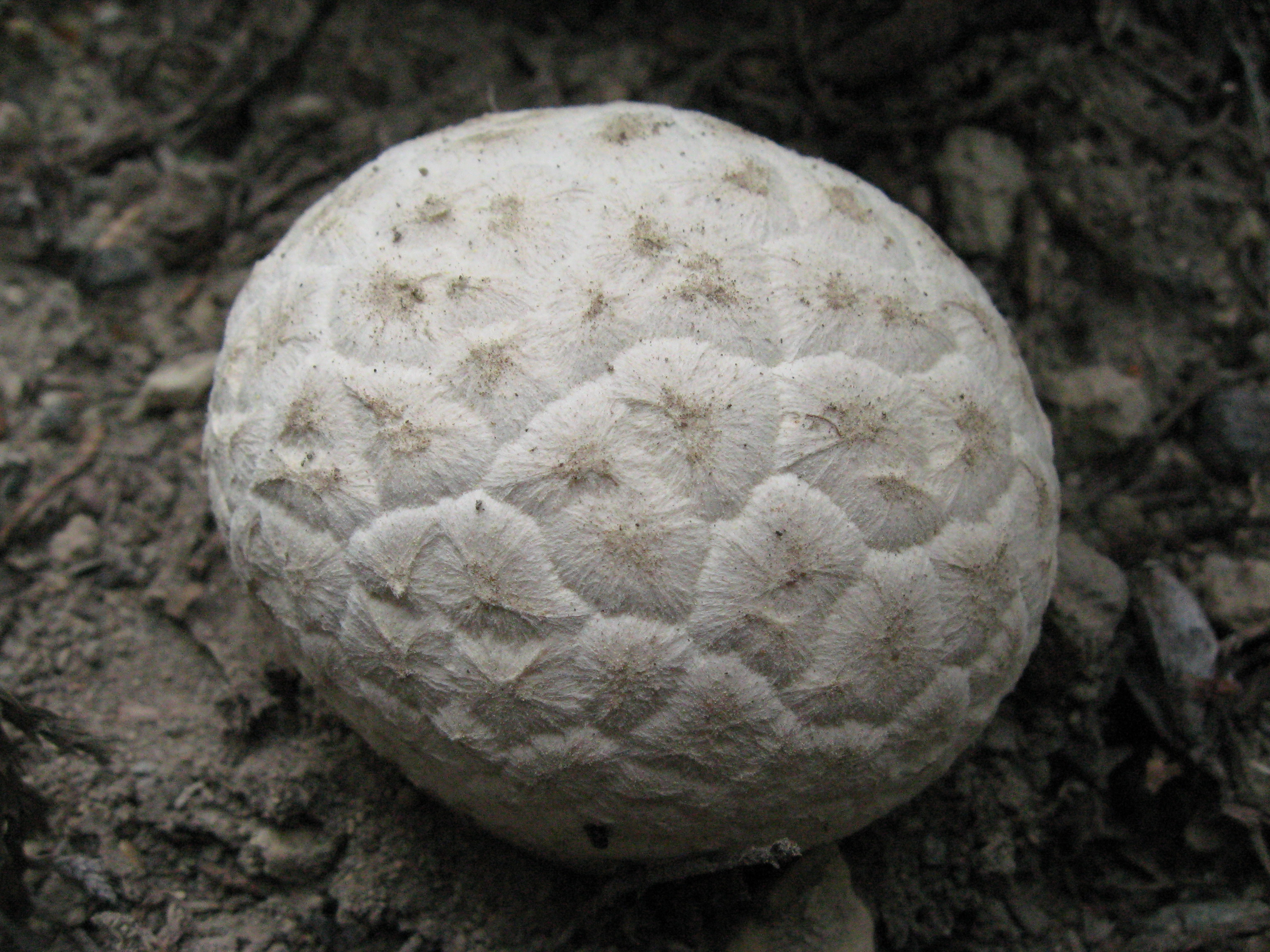
Calbovista subsculpta

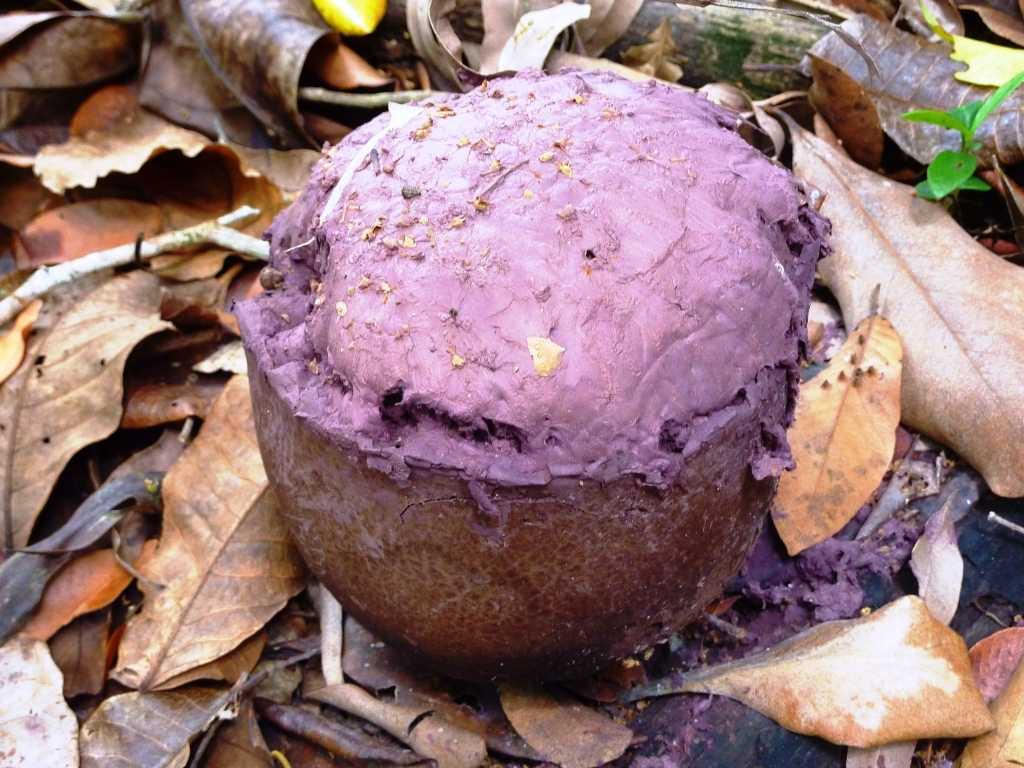
Calvatia cyathiformis

Puffballs are found in several genera of the division Basidiomycota.

Puffballs are a type of fungus featuring a ball-shaped fruiting body that, when mature, bursts on contact or impact, releasing a cloud of dust-like spores into the surrounding area. Puffballs belong to the division Basidiomycota and encompass several genera, including Calvatia, Calbovista and Lycoperdon. The puffballs were previously treated as a taxonomic group called the Gasteromycetes or Gasteromycetidae, but they are now known to be a polyphyletic assemblage.

The distinguishing feature of all puffballs is that they do not have an open cap with spore-bearing gills. Instead, spores are produced internally, in a spheroidal fruit body called a gasterothecium (gasteroid 'stomach-like' basidiocarp). As the spores mature, they form a mass called a gleba in the centre of the fruitbody that is often of a distinctive color and texture. The basidiocarp remains closed until after the spores have been released from the basidia. Eventually, it develops an aperture, or dries, becomes brittle, and splits, and the spores escape. The spores of puffballs are statismospores rather than ballistospores, meaning they are not forcibly extruded from the basidium. Puffballs and similar forms are thought to have evolved convergently (that is, in numerous independent events) from Hymenomycetes by gasteromycetation, through secotioid stages. Thus, 'Gasteromycetes' and 'Gasteromycetidae' are now considered to be descriptive, morphological terms (more properly gasteroid or gasteromycetes, to avoid taxonomic implications) but not valid cladistic terms.

True puffballs do not have a visible stalk or stem, while stalked puffballs do have a stalk that supports the gleba. None of the stalked puffballs are edible as they are tough and woody mushrooms. The Hymenogastrales and Enteridium lycoperdon, a slime mold, are the false puffballs. A gleba which is powdery on maturity is a feature of true puffballs, stalked puffballs and earthstars. False puffballs are hard like rock or brittle. All false puffballs are inedible, as they are tough and bitter to taste. The genus Scleroderma, which has a young purple gleba, should also be avoided.

Puffballs were traditionally used in Tibet for making ink by burning them, grinding the ash, then putting them in water and adding glue liquid and "a nye shing ma decoction", which, when pressed for a long time, made a black dark substance that was used as ink. Rural Americans burned the common puffball with some kind of bee smoker to anesthetize honey bees as a means to safely procure honey; the practice later inspired experimental medicinal application of the puffball smoke as a surgical general anesthetic in 1853.

== Edibility and identification ==
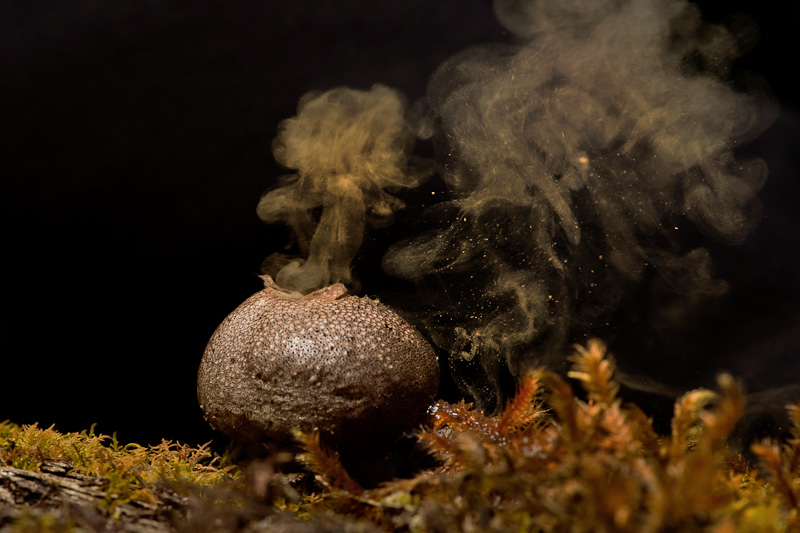
Cloud of spores poofs out of a puffball fungus

While most puffballs are not poisonous, some often look similar to young agarics, and especially the deadly Amanitas, such as the death cap or destroying angel mushrooms. Young puffballs in the edible stage, before maturation of the gleba, have undifferentiated white flesh within, whereas the gills of immature Amanita mushrooms can be seen if they are closely examined. Edible puffballs become inedible after reaching maturity

Sliced and whole giant puffballs (Calvatia gigantea) on sale at a market in England

The giant puffball, Calvatia gigantea, reaches 1 foot (0.30 m) or more in diameter, and is difficult to mistake for any other fungus. It has been estimated that, when mature, a large specimen of this fungus will produce around 7 × 10^{12} spores, which is more than any other known organism.

Some puffball mushrooms may also be stalked, such as those found in the genus Tulostoma. There are also a number of false puffballs that look similar to the true ones.

Common puffball, releasing spores in a burst by compressing the body

=== Stalked ===
Stalked puffballs species:

- Battarrea phalloides
- Calostoma cinnabarina (Stalked Puffball-in-Aspic)
- Pisolithus tinctorius
- Podaxis pistillaris
- Tulostoma (genus)

=== True ===
True puffballs genera and species:

- Bovista – various species, including:
  - Bovista aestivalis
  - Bovista dermoxantha
  - Bovista nigrescens
  - Bovista plumbea
- Calvatia – various species, including:
  - Calvatia bovista
  - Calvatia craniiformis
  - Calvatia cyathiformis
  - Calvatia gigantea
  - Calvatia booniana
  - Calvatia fumosa
  - Calvatia lepidophora
  - Calvatia pachyderma
  - Calvatia sculpta
  - Calvatia subcretacea – edible
  - Calbovista subsculpta
- Handkea – various species, including:
  - Handkea utriformis
- Lycoperdon – various species, including:
  - Lycoperdon candidum
  - Lycoperdon echinatum
  - Lycoperdon fusillum
  - Lycoperdon umbrinum
- Scleroderma – various species, including:
  - Scleroderma auratium
  - Scleroderma geaster – not edible

=== False ===
False puffballs species:

  - Endoptychum agaricoides
  - Nivatogastrium nubigenum
  - Podaxis pistillaris
  - Rhizopogon rubescens
  - Truncocolumella citrina

== Traditional uses ==
Puffballs have a long history of use in traditional medicine across the world. The dry, powdery spores were widely used as a styptic to stop bleeding and as a dressing for wounds, burns, and sores. This practice was common among Indigenous peoples of North America, who applied the spore powder directly to wounds, cuts, and nosebleeds, and also used it on the umbilical cords of newborns to aid clotting and prevent infection. This ethnomycological use was not confined to the Americas, with similar hemostatic applications being independently developed in Asia and Europe. Modern scientific analysis has lent support to these traditional practices, finding that puffball spores contain compounds with antimicrobial and antibacterial properties effective against some pathogens, and that they can promote fibrin formation.

== Classification ==
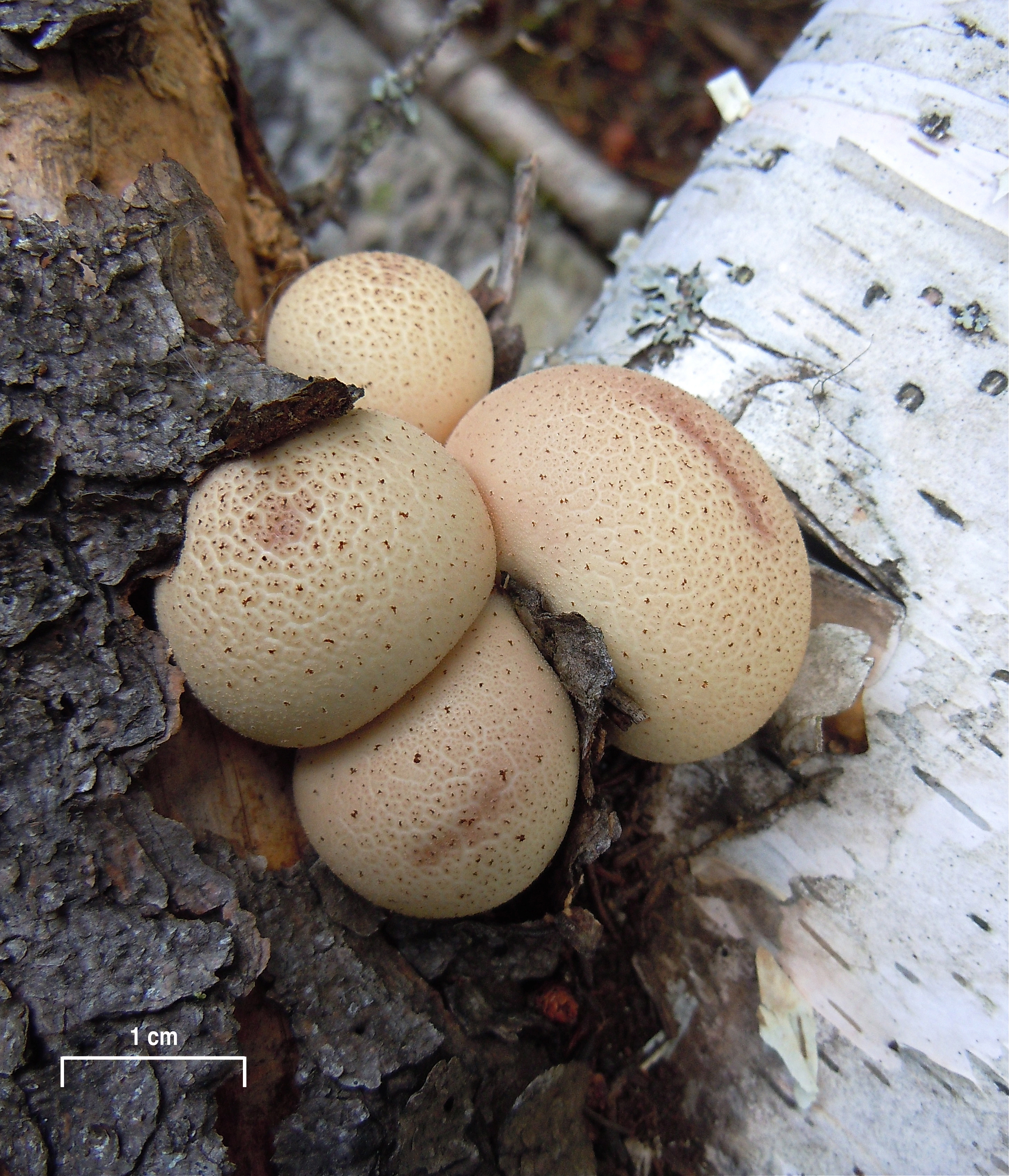
Apioperdon pyriforme

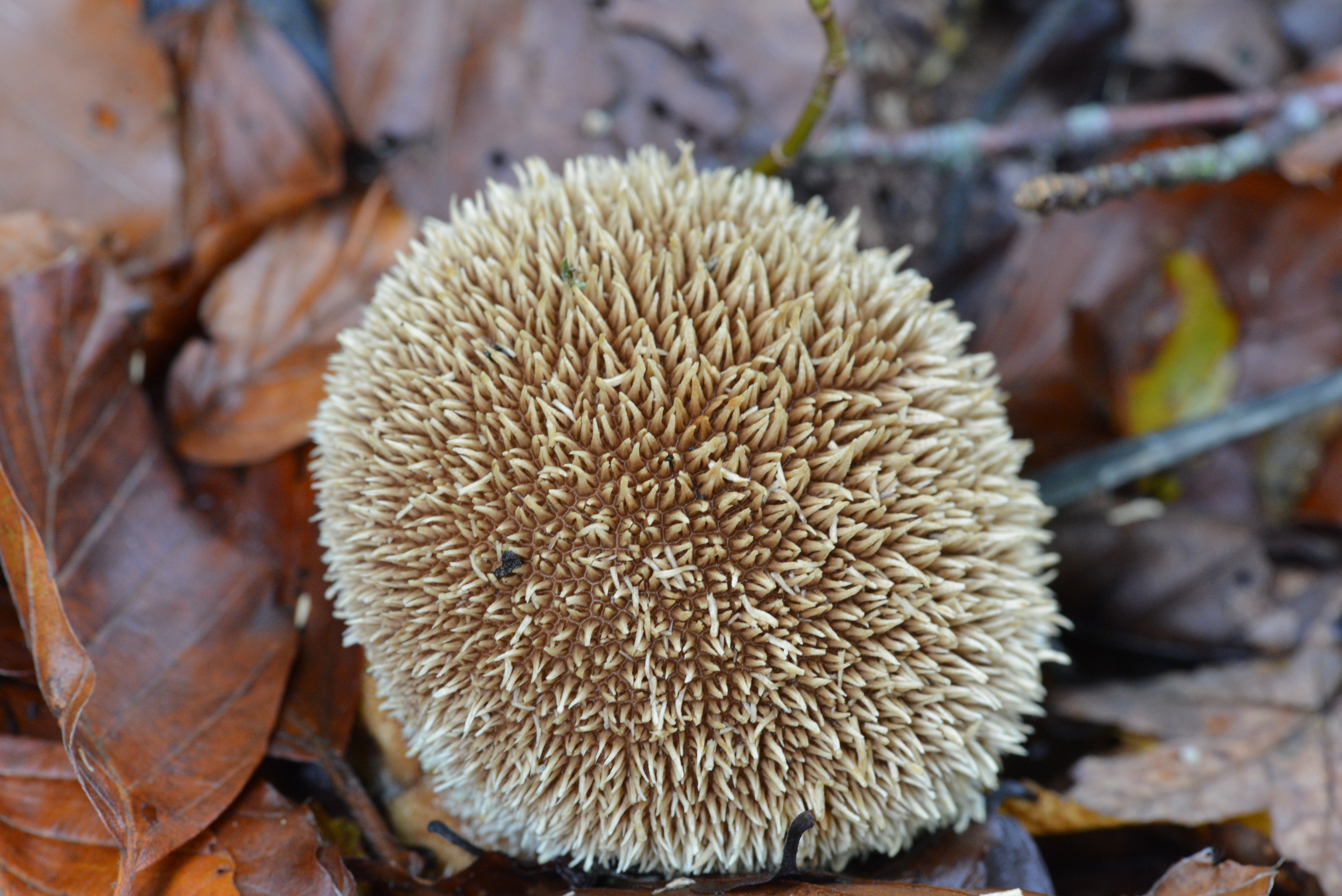
Lycoperdon echinatum

Major orders:

- Agaricales (including now-obsolete orders Lycoperdales, Tulostomatales, and Nidulariales)
  - Basidiomycetes: Agaricales: Lycoperdaceae: Calvatia
    - Calvatia booniana
    - Calvatia bovista (Handkea utriformis)
    - Calvatia craniiformis
    - Calvatia cyathiformis
    - Calvatia fumosa (Handkea fumosa)
    - Calvatia gigantea
    - Calvatia lepidophora
    - Calvatia rubroflava
    - Calvatia sculpta
    - Calvatia subcretacea (Handkea subcretacea)
  - Basidiomycetes: Agaricales: Lycoperdaceae: Lycoperdon
    - Lycoperdon foetidum (Lycoperdon nigrescens)
    - Lycoperdon perlatum
    - Lycoperdon pulcherrimum
    - Lycoperdon pusillum
    - Lycoperdon pyriforme
  - Basidiomycetes: Agaricales: Lycoperdaceae: Vascellum
    - Vascellum curtisii
    - Vascellum pratense – edible when interior is white
- Geastrales and Phallales (related to Cantharellales),
  - Basidiomycetes: Phallales: Geastraceae: Geastrum
    - Geastrum coronatum
    - Geastrum fornicatum
    - Geastrum saccatum
- Sclerodermatales (related to Boletales)
  - Basidiomycetes: Boletales: Sclerodermataceae: Scleroderma
    - Scleroderma areolatum
    - Scleroderma bovista
    - Scleroderma cepa
    - Scleroderma citrinum
    - Scleroderma meridionale
    - Scleroderma michiganense
    - Scleroderma polyrhizum
    - Scleroderma septentrionale
- Various false-truffles (hypogaeic gasteromycetes) related to different hymenomycete orders

Similarly, the true truffles (Tuberales) are gasteroid Ascomycota. Their ascocarps are called tuberothecia.

== See also ==
- Lycoperdonosis
