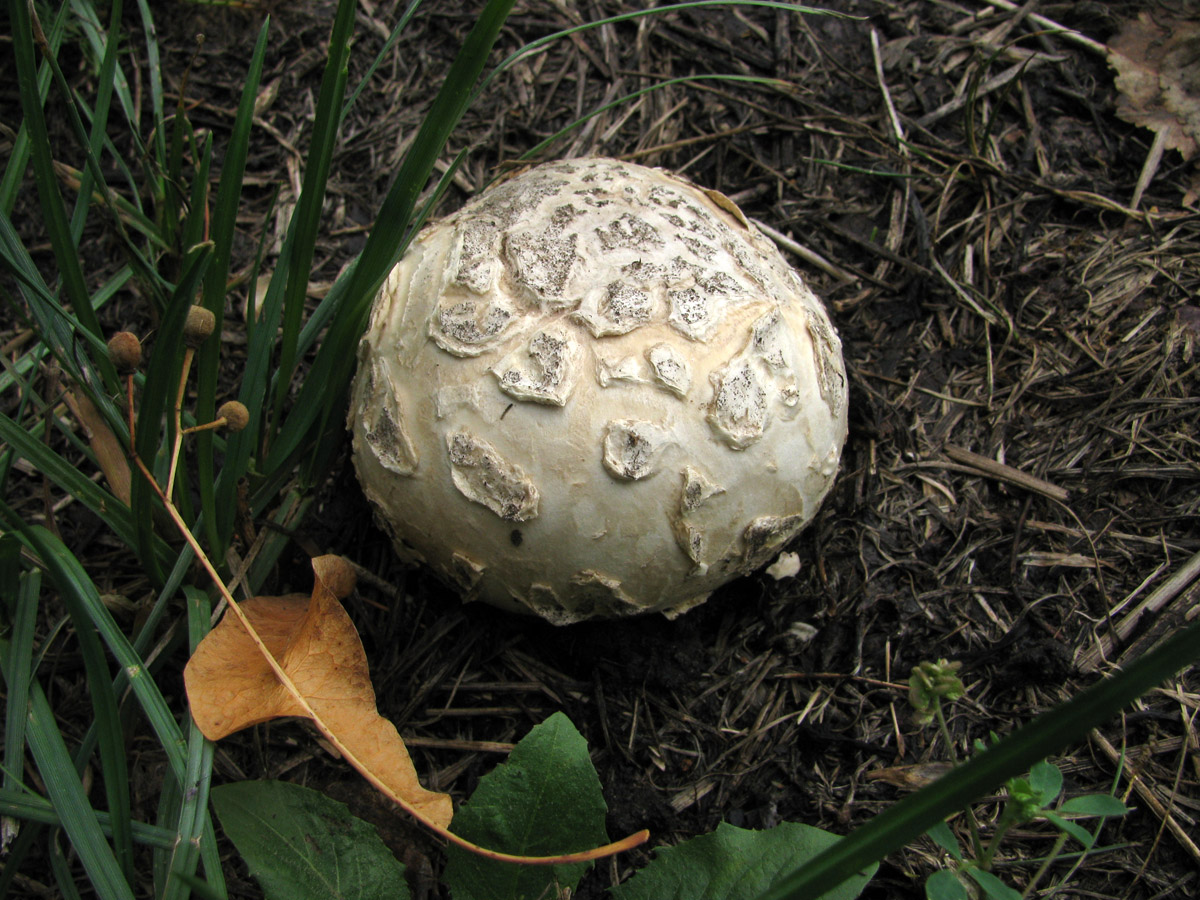

Conservation status
- Secure (NatureServe)

Scientific classification
- Kingdom: Fungi
- Division: Basidiomycota
- Class: Agaricomycetes
- Order: Agaricales
- Family: Agaricaceae
- Genus: Mycenastrum; Desv. (1842)
- Species: M. corium

Binomial name
- Mycenastrum corium (Guers.) Desv. (1842)

Synonyms
- Genus: Endonevrum Czern. (1845); Pachyderma Schulzer (1876); Species: Lycoperdon corium Guers. (1805); Scleroderma corium (Guers.) A.H.Graves (1830); Sterrebekia corium (Guers.) Fr. (1849)

= Mycenastrum =

Genus of fungi

Mycenastrum
- Mycological characteristics
- Glebal hymenium
- No distinct cap
- Hymenium attachment is irregular or not applicable
- Lacks a stipe
- Spore print is white to purple-brown
- Ecology is saprotrophic
- Edibility is unknown

Mycenastrum is a fungal genus in the family Agaricaceae. The genus is monotypic, containing one widely distributed species, Mycenastrum corium, known by various common names: the giant pasture puffball, leathery puffball, or tough puffball.

The roughly spherical to turnip-shaped puffball-like fruit bodies grow to a diameter of 6–24 cm (2–9 in). Initially covered by a thick, felted, whitish layer, the puffballs develop a characteristic checkered skin (peridium) in age. As the spores mature, the gleba turns first yellowish then purplish brown. Spores are released when the peridium eventually splits open into irregularly shaped sections. Microscopically, the gleba consists of spherical, dark brown spores with rounded bumps on their surfaces, and capillitia—masses of intricately branched fibers—that form long thornlike spines.

The puffball grows on or in the ground in prairie or desert habitats. Although widely distributed, it is not commonly encountered. It is a threatened species in Europe. When the internal spore mass (the gleba) is firm and white, the puffball is edible, although some individuals may suffer mild gastrointestinal symptoms after eating it.

== Taxonomy ==
The species was originally described in 1805 as Lycoperdon corium in the second volume of Augustin Pyramus de Candolle and Jean-Baptiste Lamarck's Flore Française. They attributed authorship to French botanist Louis Ben Guersent, who discovered it in an alfalfa field between the town of La Sotte and Rouen in northern France. Synonyms include Scleroderma corium, published by Arthur Harmount Graves in 1830, and Steerbekia corium, published by Elias Magnus Fries in 1849. The species was given its current name by Nicaise Auguste Desvaux in 1842, who circumscribed the genus Mycenastrum to contain it. Generic synonyms are Vassilii Czernajew's 1845 Endonevrum and Stephan Schulzer von Müggenburg's 1876 Pachyderma.

In 1948, Sanford Myron Zeller circumscribed the new family Mycenastraceae, containing both Mycenastrum as the type genus, and Bovista. A 2001 molecular study supported the inclusion of Mycenastrum corium in the Lycoperdales, where it was traditionally placed. In a more recent (2008) cladistic analysis, Mycenastrum was shown to be a sister group to the Lycoperdaceae; authors Larsson and Jeppson agreed with Zeller (1949) and Pilat's (1958) decision to regard Mycenastrium as a monotypic genus in the separate family Mycenastraceae. Despite this, several taxonomic authorities prefer to fold Mycenastraceae into the Agaricaceae.

It is commonly known as the "leathery puffball", the "tough puffball", or the "giant pasture puffball".

María Homrich & Jorge E. Wright published the variety M. corium var. diabolicum in 1973 from South America. M. corium subspecies ferrugineum was described in 2005 from Jefferson County, Colorado, by Orson K. Miller.

=== Former Mycenastrum ===
Most species historically named as Mycenastrum have since been transferred to other genera, usually Scleroderma, but also Glyptoderma, Bovista, and Gastropila. Many, including those species that have not been reclassified are poorly known; the nomenclatural authority Index Fungorum considers only four of these former Mycenastrum species to be currently valid: Bovista bovistoides, B. lycoperdoides, Gastropila fragilis, and Glyptoderma coelatum.

Name	Authority	Year	Current name
M. beccarii	Pass.	1875	Scleroderma beccarii
M. bovistoides	Cooke & Massee	1887	Bovista bovistoides
M. chilense	Mont.	1843	
M. coelatum	Pat.	1899	Glyptoderma coelatum
M. dugesii	De Seynes	1886	
M. fragile	Lév.	1844	Gastropila fragilis
M. leiospermum	Mont.	1847	
M. leptodermeum	Durieu	1848	Scleroderma leptodermeum
M. lycoperdoides	Cooke	1884	Bovista lycoperdoides
M. martinicense	Pat.	1902	Scleroderma martinicense
M. ohiense	Ellis & Morgan	1885	Lycoperdon radicatum
M. olivaceum	Cooke & Massee	1887	Scleroderma olivaceum
M. oregonense	Ellis & Everh.	1885	Bovista pila
M. phaeotrichum	Berk.	1843	Scleroderma phaeotrichum
M. phaeotrichum var. australe	Berk.	1845	
M. radicatum	Durieu	1849	Scleroderma radicatum
M. spinulosum	Peck	1881	

== Description ==
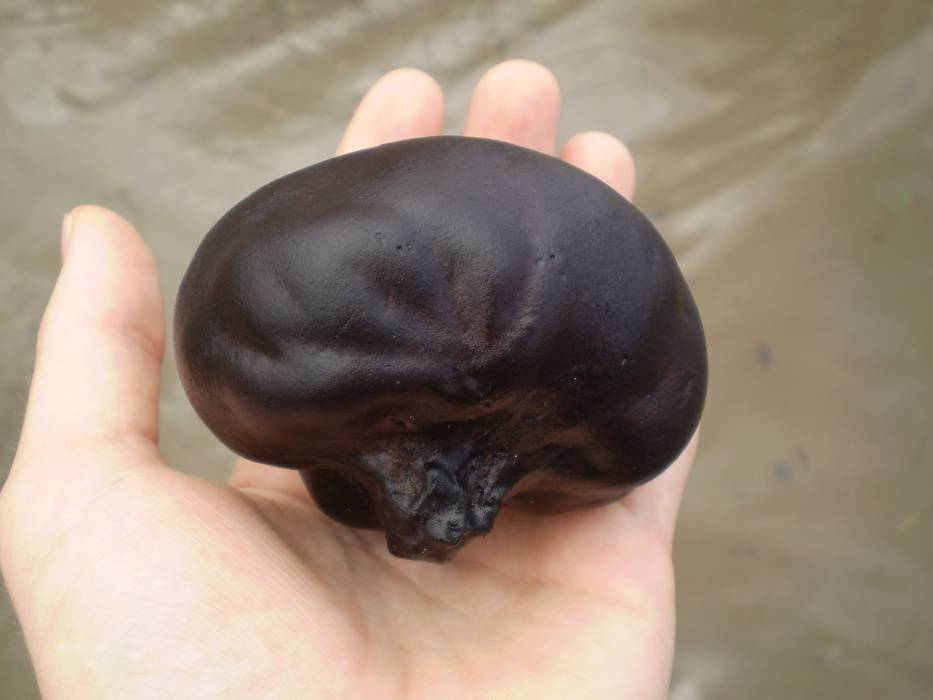
Mycenastrum puffballs that grow underground have a smooth, chocolate-brown coloured surface lacking the patches characteristic of above-ground versions.

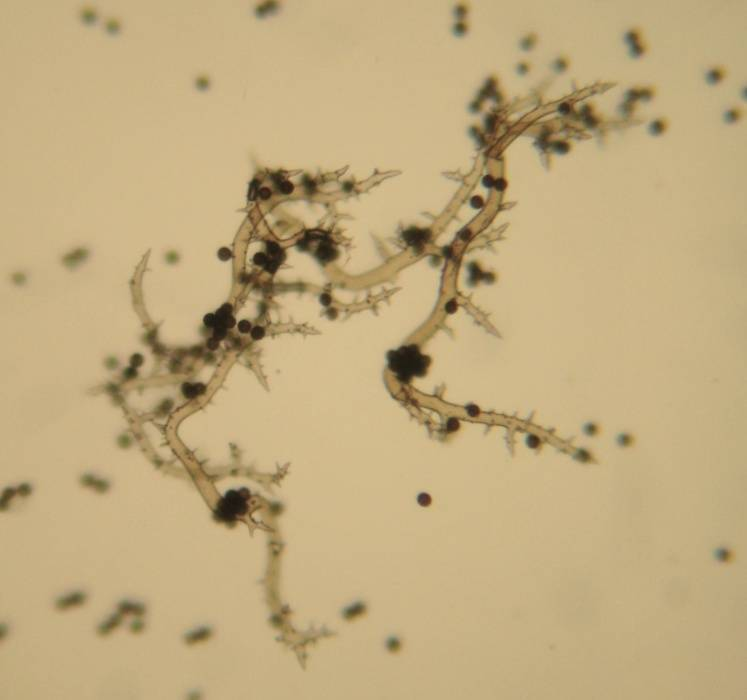
The characteristic spiny capillitia

The gleba is white when young and has a cheesy appearance and consistency. As the puffball matures, it undergoes a lytic process involving water loss. Subsequently, the gleba becomes olivaceous, olive-brown, and finally, dark olive when dry, and then develops a characteristic pungent smell.

The fruit body usually grows to a diameter of 6–15 cm (2–6 in), although extremes of 3 cm (1.2 in) and 27 cm (11 in) have been reported. Its shape ranges from roughly spherical, to obovate (egg-shaped) or pyriform (pear-shaped), sometimes plicate (crumpled, wrinkled) around a somewhat fibrous, persistent tuft of mycelium. The puffball is initially covered by a thick, felted, whitish layer (the exoperidium). This is continuous at first but eventually cracks and peels away in thin flakes, exposing a leathery to corky, nearly smooth, light brown to dark pinkish-brown surface. This tough layer of tissue (the endoperidium) measures about 2 mm thick and encloses the gleba. In maturity, the endoperidium opens by irregular splits that eventually extend towards the base in a star-shaped manner. These torn segments of endoperidium sometimes turn inside out, sometimes drying rigid, exposing a felt-like internal surface.

Fruit bodies that grow underground have a conspicuously different morphology–a smooth, chocolate-brown coloured surface that lacks the patches characteristic of above-ground fruit bodies, and their capillitia are bifurcate with stumpy spines. The odor and taste of the species have been described as pungent or earthy and its taste astringent. Its spores are spherical, measuring 8–13 μm, and have a surface of irregular, coarse warts. The capillitia comprise late-maturing, thick-walled cells in the gleba. The main axes of these branched cells are 20–30 μm thick, and they are covered with numerous spines.

Mycenastrum corium subsp. ferrugineum has a deep rusty red to reddish orange gleba, clearly distinguishing it from the glebal coloring of the main subspecies. M. corium var. diabolicum has an extremely spiny capillitium.

=== Puffball maturation ===
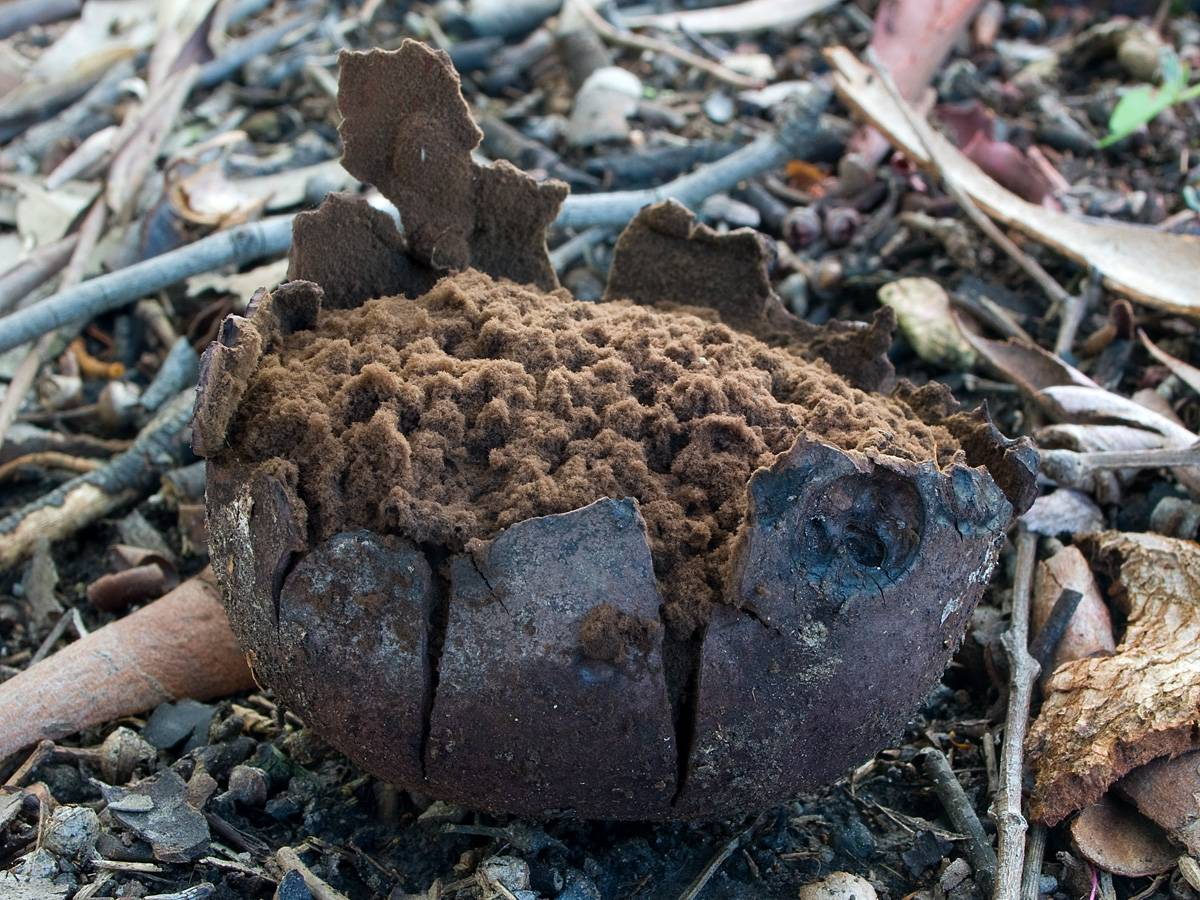
Mature fruit body found in Australia

The manner in which the puffball splits open (dehisces) has been described by 19th-century American mycologist William Henry Long. The thick and leathery peridium of the mature puffball remains unopened for several months without splitting. After several alternating cycles of wetting and drying, fissures develop across the top. These fissures usually radiate from a common center near the top of the fruit body and finally produce very irregular star-like teeth. In time, the entire upper half of the puffball is open and exposed during dry weather. In this condition, the spores are blown out by the wind and widely distributed.

During every rainy spell, the puffball promptly closes only to open again when dry weather returns. At each alternate opening and closing the peridium is split more and more, until finally it is expanded into a flat shape, or even curls backward. In the puffball, the outer layer of the peridium comprises cells arranged so that when wet they adsorb water and expand, thus closing the top of the puffball. Upon drying, these outer cells lose water and gradually shrink, thus producing an unequal tension between the outer and inner cells of the peridium. This tension causes the irregular star-like pieces of the peridium to gradually separate and curve outward, thus opening the top of the puffball during dry weather.

== Distribution, habitat, and ecology ==
The puffball is widely distributed, and has been recorded in Africa (Zimbabwe), Asia (China, India, Iran, Mongolia, and Yemen), South America (Argentina, Chile and Uruguay), North America, Australia, and New Zealand. In Europe it is found in southern Scandinavia and is widespread to the south of the continent. Although it was reported in Scotland in 2010 (its first appearance on the British mainland), the grassland habitat where it was found has since become heavily eroded, and may be unsuitable for future appearances of the species. Mycenastrum corium is a threatened species in Europe, and is listed as vulnerable in the Regional Red List of Poland. In North America, it is most common in western regions of the United States and Canada, but it has also been recorded in eastern Canada. Poorly known in Mexico, it has been recorded from Baja California, Chihuahua, Nuevo León, San Luis Potosi, Sonora, Mexico City. The variety M. corium var. diabolicum occurs in Sub-Saharan Africa, tropical Asia, the Caribbean, and South America.

Mycenastrum corium is a saprobic species, consuming dead organic debris. It is usually found fruiting on the ground singly, scattered, in rings, or in clusters, but is can also grow underground. Fruiting occurs at low elevations in groups in open habitats dominated by sagebrush and saltbrush, or in grassy or shrubby wet areas in dry prairie. Other reported habitats include old haystacks, on silage, and roadsides. Mature fruit bodies can be broken loose from attachment to the substrate and be rolled around by wind, similar to some Bovista puffballs. Although the species is not frequently encountered, it has been suggested that this is because it grows in locations "rather seldom visited by mycologists". M. corium could be a useful indicator species for climate change.

The large European bird great bustard (Otis tarda) has been recorded feeding on the puffball.

== Uses ==
The puffball is edible when the gleba is still firm and white. They are reportedly consumed by the tribal people of Madhya Pradesh. In Mexico, a large collection was consumed by several people who confused the species with Calvatia, a puffball genus containing popular edible members. Of the five who ate the fungus, two had gastrointestinal symptoms including stomachache, flatulence, and diarrhea; the other three did not have symptoms.

Because of their thick outer peridium, M. corium puffballs can withstand hard blows without breaking, and children have used them as replacements for balls. The puffballs have also been used medicinally in Mexico as a hemostatic, as a throat and lung tonic, and for their purported anti-inflammatory properties.

== See also ==
- List of Agaricaceae genera
- List of Agaricales genera
