= Nicaise Auguste Desvaux =

French botanist (1784-1856)

Nicaise Auguste Desvaux (28 August 1784 – 12 July 1856) was a French botanist.

From 1816 he taught classes in Angers, where from 1817 to 1838 he served as director of its botanical garden. He described the botanical genera Neslia, Mycenastrum, Rostkovia and Didymoglossum. The genus Desvauxia is named in his honor.

== Works ==
- Journal de Botanique, appliquée à l'Agriculture, à la Pharmacie, à la Médecine et aux Arts (1813-1815, 4 volumes).
- Observations sur les plantes des environs d'Angers (1818).
- Flore de l'Anjou ou exposition méthodique des plantes du département de Maine et Loire et de l’ancien Anjou (1827).
- Prodrome de la famille des fougères (1827).
- Sur le genre Mycenastrum, In: Annales des Sciences Naturelles Botanique, Série 2 17: 143-[147] (1842).

Note: He is not to be confused with French botanist Étienne-Émile Desvaux (1830-1854, botanical abbrev. É.Desv.).
