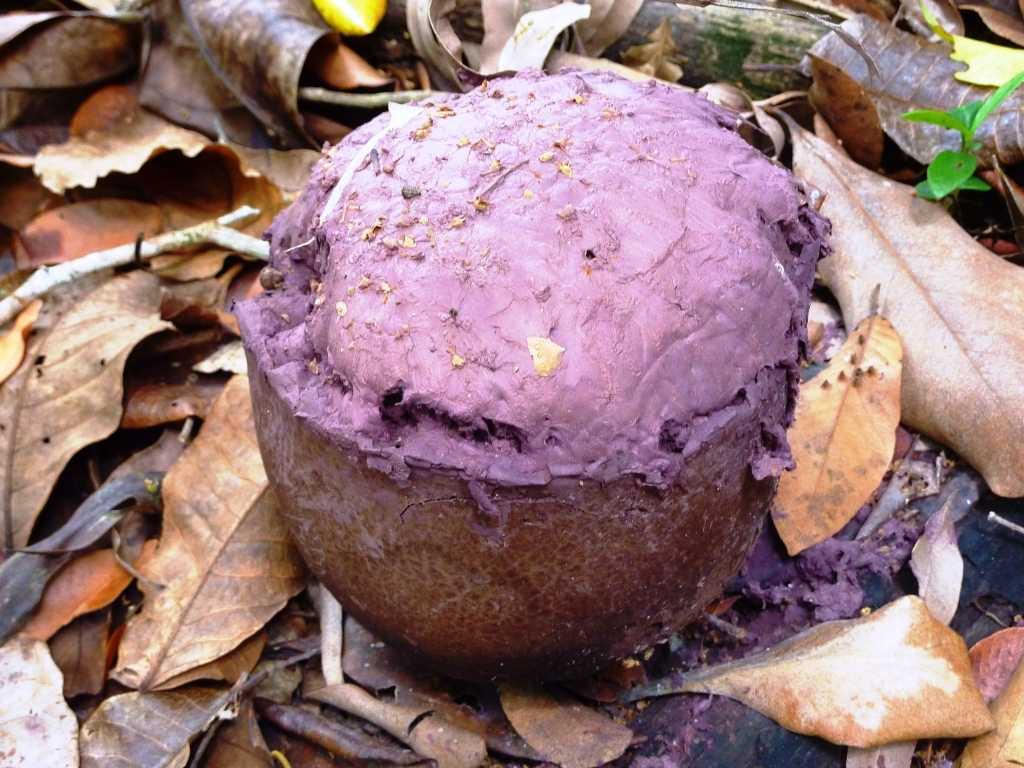
- On a lawn near Cooktown, Queensland, Australia

Scientific classification
- Kingdom: Fungi
- Division: Basidiomycota
- Class: Agaricomycetes
- Order: Agaricales
- Family: Agaricaceae
- Genus: Calvatia
- Species: C. cyathiformis

Binomial name
- Calvatia cyathiformis (Bosc) Morgan. J. Cincinnati Soc. Nat. Hist. 12: 168 (1890)

= Calvatia cyathiformis =

Calvatia cyathiformis
- Mycological characteristics
- Glebal hymenium
- No distinct cap
- Hymenium attachment is not applicable
- Lacks a stipe
- Spore print is purple to purple-brown
- Ecology is saprotrophic
- Edibility is edible or inedible

Calvatia cyathiformis, or purple-spored puffball, is a large saprobic species of Calvatia. This terrestrial puffball has purplish or purple-brown spores, which distinguish it from other large Agaricales. It is found in North America and Australia, mostly in prairie or grassland environments. It is considered a choice edible when it is young and the interior is white.

== Description ==
The fruiting body is 5–20 cm (2–8 in) high and/or broad. When young it is relatively smooth and spherical or slightly flattened and can be white, purplish or brownish. It has a chocolate-brown or purple-colored gleba with a smooth exoperidium. As it matures, it often becomes pear- or top-shaped and the exterior skin takes on a dark or silvery colour. As it ages the exterior dries and cracks and the fleshy spore-bearing interior breaks away to be distributed by wind and rain. After the spores completely disperse, a sterile base in the form of a soft leathery cup remains on the ground.

The spores are 3.5–7.5 μm in diameter, "round, spiny or warty to nearly smooth. Capillitial threads 3–7.5 μm wide; thick-walled; minutely pitted." The spore mass turns from white to yellow to dull purple or purple-brown at maturity.

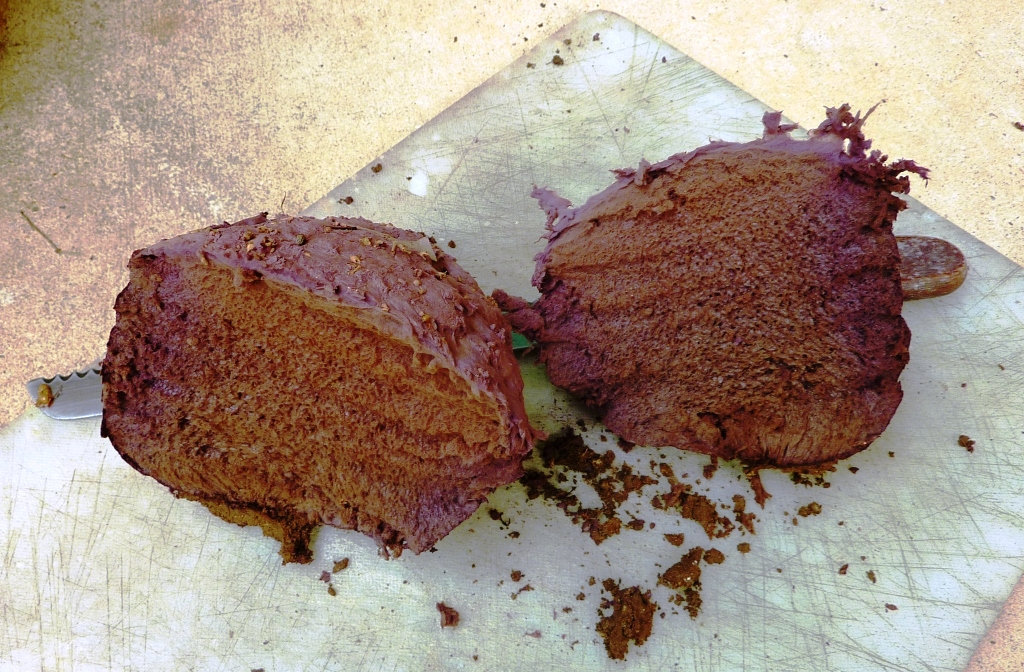
Interior of a mature specimen

=== Similar species ===
Outside of the genus, similar species include Lycoperdon utriforme.

== Habitat and distribution ==
Calvatia cyathiformis is commonly found in grazing paddocks and grassed areas around the wet areas of Australia in the southwest of Western Australia, and from Adelaide in South Australia to Cooktown, on Cape York Peninsula, as well as in Darwin, Northern Territory.

== Uses ==
It is considered a choice edible when it is young and the interior is white. It is no longer edible when its interior flesh turns to a tan colour. The puffball has not been noted to have a distinctive odor or taste.
