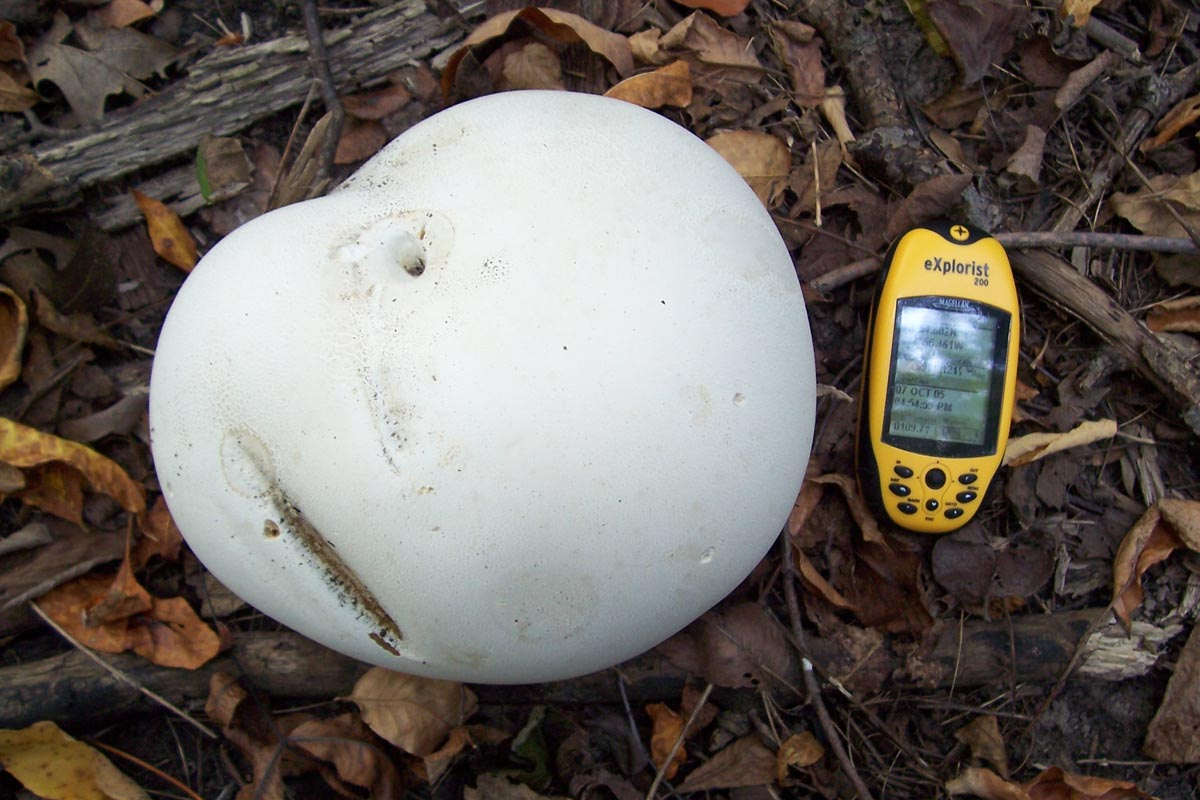
- Giant puffball with a 11.7 x 5.4 cm GPS receiver for scale

Scientific classification
- Kingdom: Fungi
- Division: Basidiomycota
- Class: Agaricomycetes
- Order: Agaricales
- Family: Agaricaceae
- Genus: Calvatia
- Species: C. gigantea

Binomial name
- Calvatia gigantea (Batsch ex Pers.) Lloyd

Synonyms
- Langermannia gigantea (Batsch ex Pers.) Rostk.

= Calvatia gigantea =

Giant puffball

Species of mushroom

Calvatia gigantea
- Mycological characteristics
- Glebal hymenium
- No distinct cap
- Hymenium attachment is not applicable
- Lacks a stipe
- Spore print is brown
- Ecology is saprotrophic
- Edibility is choice or inedible

Calvatia gigantea, commonly known in English as the giant puffball, is a puffball mushroom found in meadows, fields, and deciduous forests in late summer and autumn. It is found in temperate areas throughout the world. It is edible when young.

== Taxonomy ==
The classification of this species has been revised in recent decades. Puffballs, earthballs, earthstars, stinkhorns and several other kinds of fungi were once thought to be related and were known as the gasteromycetes or 'stomach' fungi, because the fertile material develops inside spherical or pear-shaped fruiting bodies; however, this group is now known to be polyphyletic.

Today, some authors place the giant puffball and other members of the genus Calvatia in order Agaricales. The giant puffball has also been placed in two other genera, Lycoperdon and Langermannia, in years past. The current view is that the giant puffball belongs in Calvatia.

== Description ==
Calvatia gigantea grows up to 10–50 centimetres (4–19 1/2 in) wide and high. It can grow to 80 cm diameter and weigh several kilograms. A specimen weighing over 23 kg (51 lb) was recorded in Thunder Bay, Ontario, Canada.

The interior of an immature puffball is white, while that of a mature specimen is greenish brown. The fruiting body of a puffball mushroom develops within a few weeks and soon begins to decompose and rot, at which point it becomes dangerous to eat. Unlike most mushrooms, all the spores of the giant puffball are created inside the fruiting body; large specimens can easily contain several trillion. The spores are yellowish, smooth, and 3–6 μm in size. They produce a white spore print when young, while it is olive with an unpleasant smell in age. Prof. John Lindley has calculated that C. gigantea grows at a rate of sixty million new cells per minute on its way to making seven quintillion (7 × 10^{18}) spores.

Growing in a deciduous forest

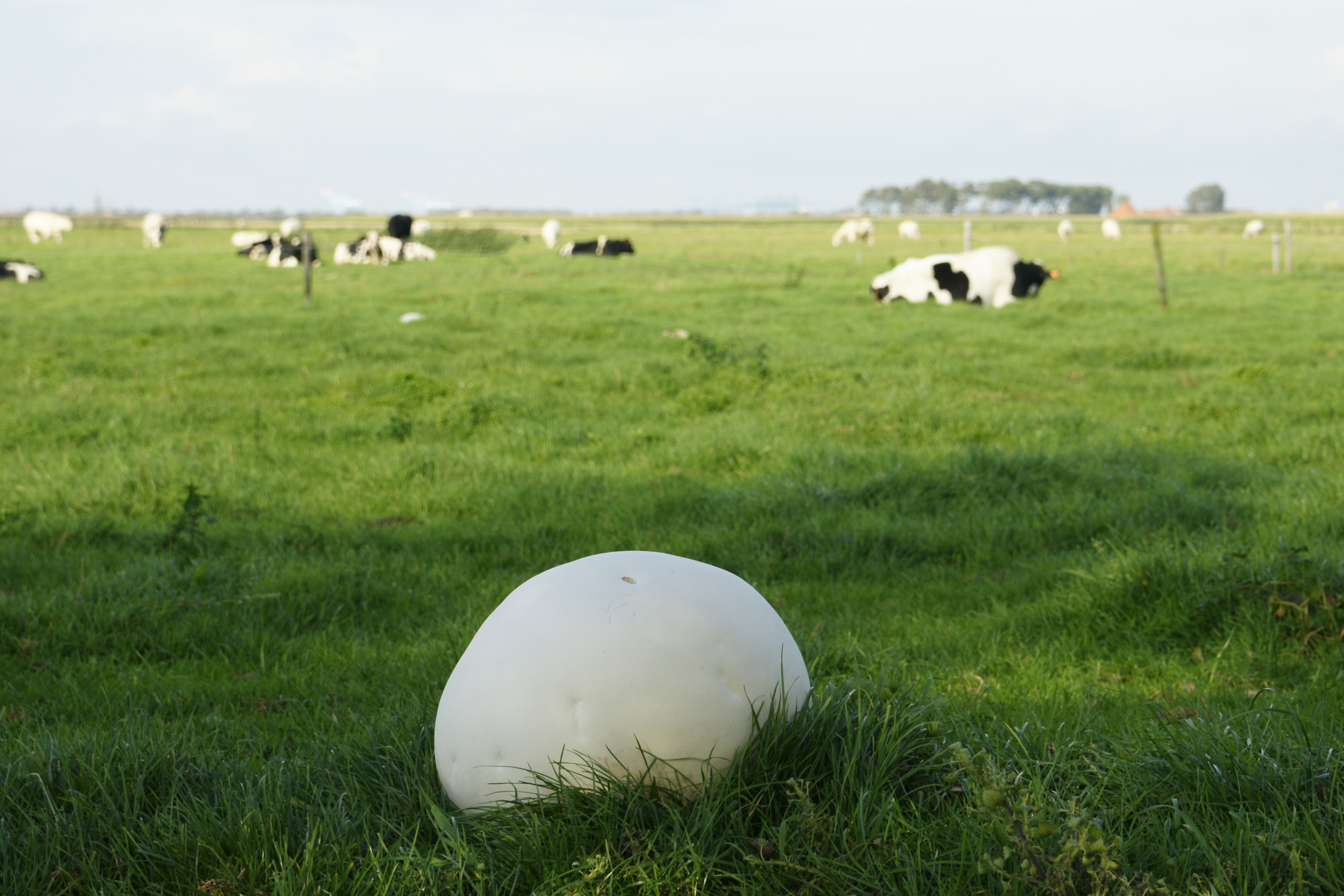
Growing in Belgium

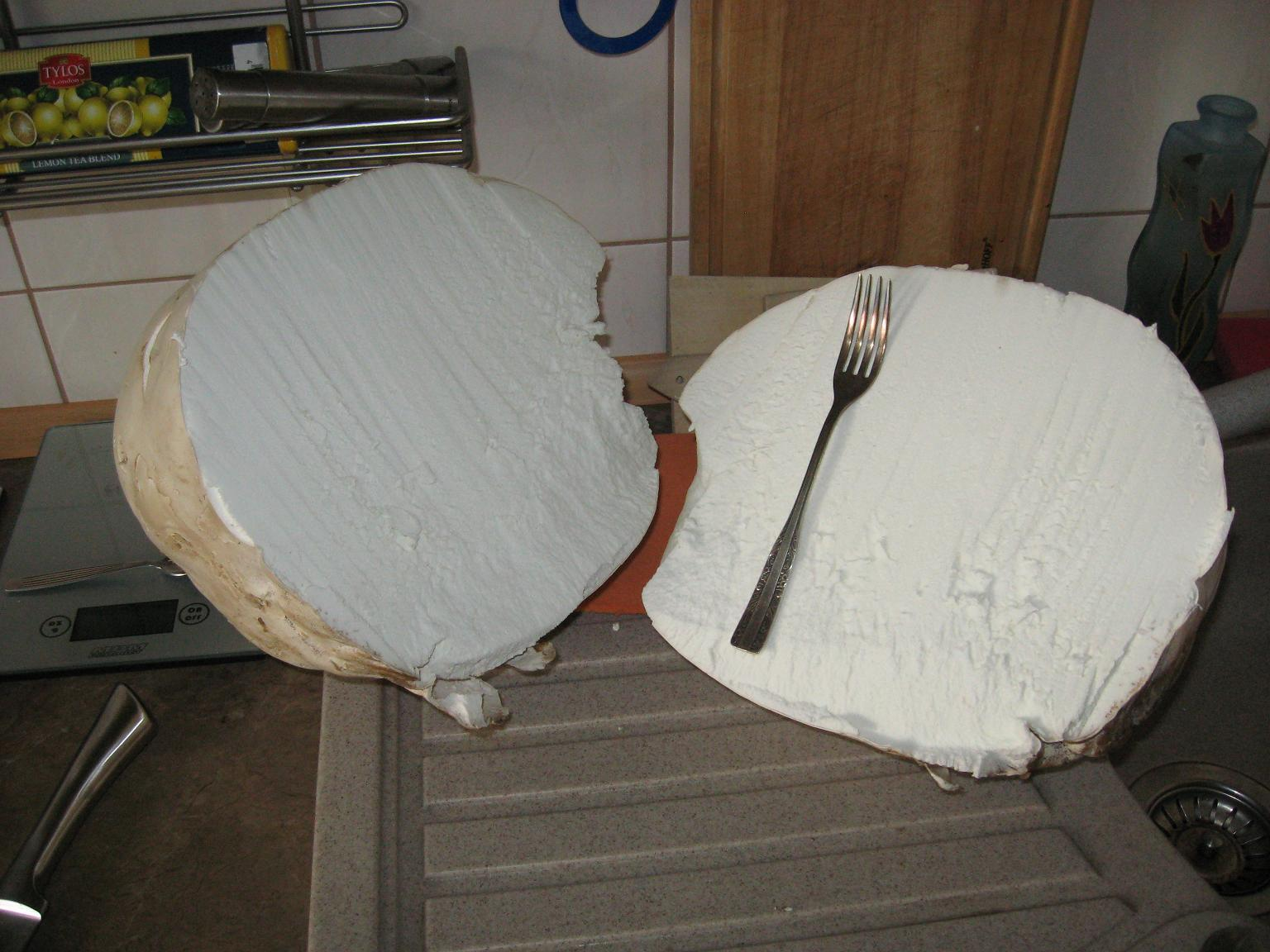
Cut, with a fork for scale

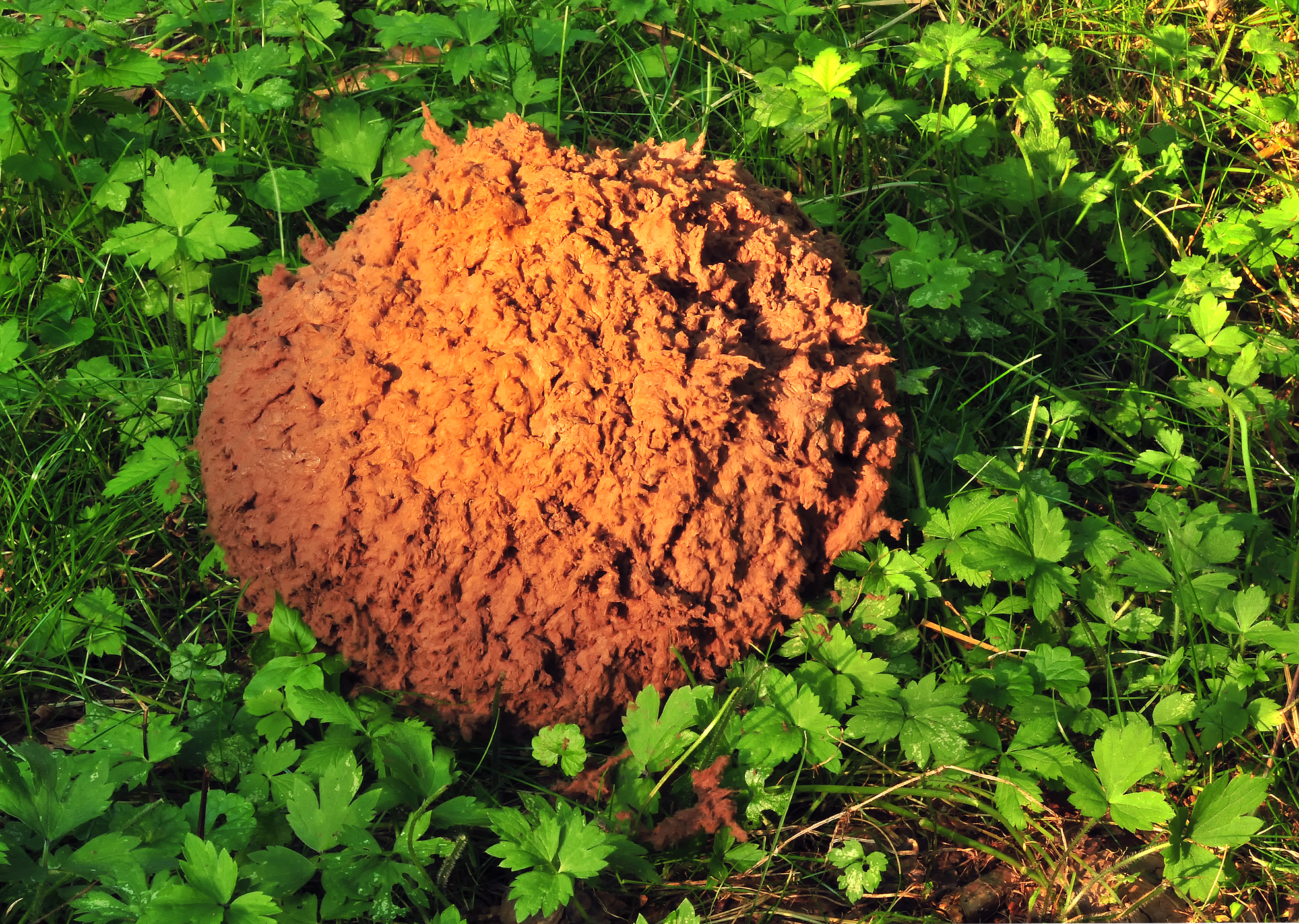
Old specimen

=== Similar species ===
Identification techniques make it relatively easy to distinguish from others of its genus.

Giant puffballs resemble the poisonous common earthball (Scleroderma citrinum). The latter species is distinguished by a much firmer, elastic fruiting body, and having an interior that becomes dark purplish-black with white reticulation early in development.

Immature gilled species, including various Amanita species, can look similar to puffballs while still contained within their universal veil. Many such species are poisonous, or even deadly, such as the destroying angel. To distinguish puffballs, they are cut open; edible puffballs have a solid white interior with no gills or other irregularities. If the inside of the puffball looks gelatinous, it may be a stinkhorn fungus and should not be consumed.

== Habitat and distribution ==
The giant puffball is commonly found in meadows, fields, and deciduous forests in late summer and autumn. It is found in temperate areas throughout the world.

== Conservation ==
It is widespread and common in the United Kingdom and North America (August–October) except for the southeast United States. It is protected in parts of Poland and is of conservation concern in Norway.

== Uses ==
Puffball mushrooms on sale at a market in England, showing slices uniform and white all the way through

=== Culinary ===
The large white mushrooms are edible when young, as are all true puffballs, but they can cause digestive issues if the spores have begun to form—as indicated by the flesh being yellowish or greenish-brown instead of pure white. An overripe puffball will fall apart and release spores when touched or if cut open, and should be discarded. Some people experience a laxative effect from eating this species.

=== Medical ===
Puffballs are a known styptic and have long been used as wound dressing, either in powdered form or as slices 3 cm thick. Authors Hui-Yeng Y. Yap, Mohammad Farhan Ariffeen Rosli, et al. found evidence to suggest that C. gigantea was "traditionally used by American Indians, Nigerian and German folks" for this purpose. The authors, however, did not specify the preferred form of wound dressing (e.g., powdered or sliced).

In addition to consuming the mushroom, the Māori people of New Zealand used it to stem bleeding and treat burns.
