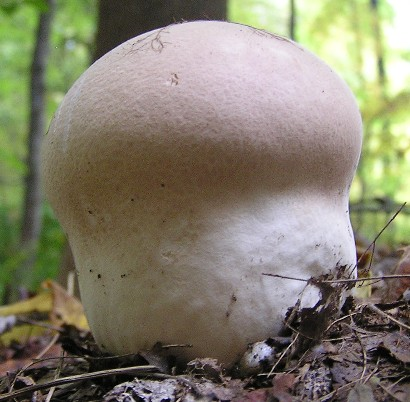
- Calvatia bovista, seen in Ohio, US

Scientific classification
- Domain: Eukaryota
- Kingdom: Fungi
- Division: Basidiomycota
- Class: Agaricomycetes
- Order: Agaricales
- Family: Agaricaceae
- Genus: Calvatia
- Species: C. bovista

Binomial name
- Calvatia bovista (L.) T. Macbr.

= Calvatia bovista =

Species of fungus

Calvatia bovista Mycological characteristics
- Glebal hymenium
- No distinct cap
- Hymenium attachment is irregular or not applicable
- Lacks a stipe
- Spore print is white to olive-brown
- Ecology is saprotrophic
- Edibility is edible or inedible

Calvatia bovista is a species of Calvatia mushroom.

== Description ==
The fruiting body is 10 to 25 centimetres (4 to 10 in) high and 5 to 25 cm (2 to 10 in) wide, round on top with a wide stemlike sterile base (not producing spores), often half the height of the fruiting body. The spores are 4–6.5 μm, round, minutely warted or spiny. The spore print is white and cheesy when young, brownish and dry in age.

It is the second largest Calvatia in North America.

== Habitat ==
It is fairly common and found in habitats such as pastures and open woods.

== Uses ==
As with other Calvatia mushrooms, it is edible when young, and it is used in medicine.
