= Capillitium =

Mass of fibers found in fungi and slime molds

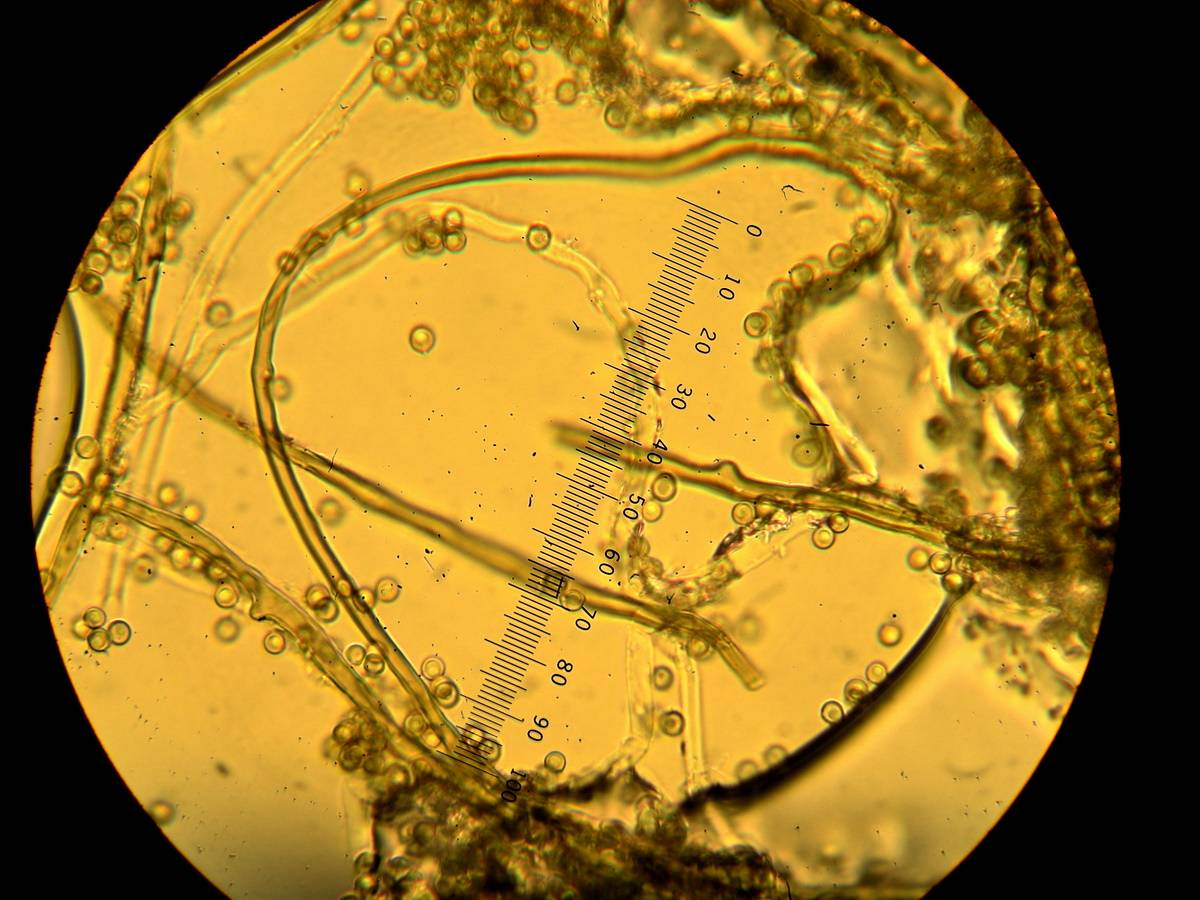
Capillitial threads and spores from the gleba of the puffball Lycoperdon echinatum

Capillitium (pl. capillitia) is a mass of sterile fibers within a fruit body interspersed among spores. It is found in Mycetozoa (slime molds) and gasteroid fungi of the fungal subdivision Agaricomycotina. In the fungi, the form of the capillitia, including shape, size, branching patterns, presence or absence of slits or pores, thickness of the walls, and color, are features that can be used to identify certain species or genera.
