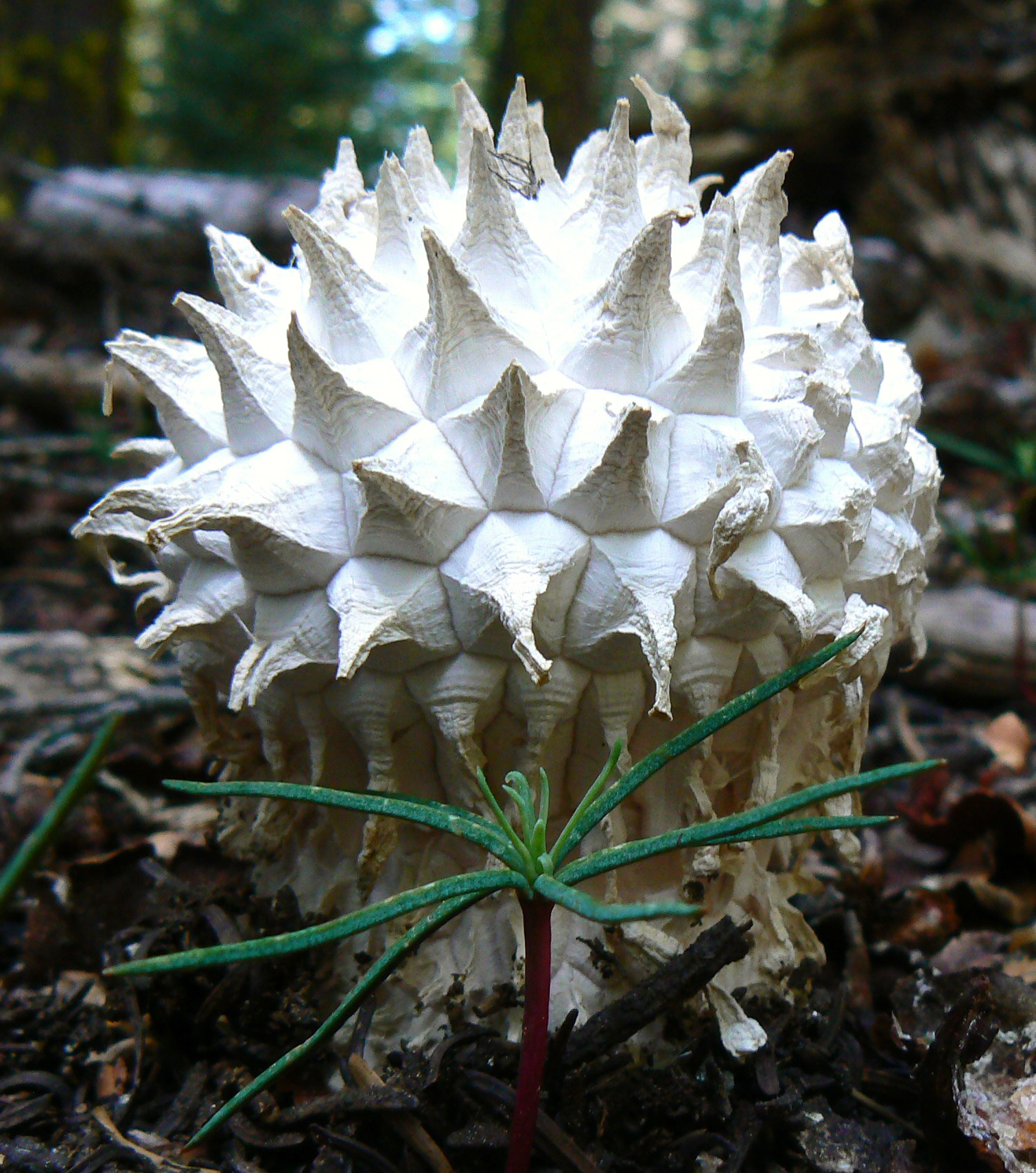

Scientific classification
- Kingdom: Fungi
- Division: Basidiomycota
- Class: Agaricomycetes
- Order: Agaricales
- Family: Agaricaceae
- Genus: Calvatia
- Species: C. sculpta

Binomial name
- Calvatia sculpta (Harkn.) Lloyd (1904)

Synonyms
- Lycoperdon sculptum Harkn. (1885)

= Calvatia sculpta =

Species of puffball fungus

Calvatia sculpta
- Mycological characteristics
- Glebal hymenium
- No distinct cap
- Hymenium attachment is not applicable
- Lacks a stipe
- Spore print is brown
- Ecology is mycorrhizal
- Edibility is edible or inedible

Calvatia sculpta, commonly known as the sculpted puffball, the sculptured puffball, the pyramid puffball, or Sierran puffball, is a species of puffball fungus in the family Agaricaceae.

Attaining dimensions of up to 8 to 15 cm (3 to 6 in) tall by 8 to 10 cm (3 to 4 in) wide, the pear- or egg-shaped puffball is readily recognizable because of the large pyramidal or polygonal warts covering its surface. The spores are roughly spherical and have wart-like projections on their surfaces. It may be easily confused with Calbovista subsculpta, a similar puffball that—in addition to differences observable only with a microscope—is larger, and has slightly raised warts with a felt-like texture. Other similar species include Calvatia arctica and immature specimens of Amanita magniverrucata.

Originally described from the Sierra Nevada, C. sculpta is found in mountainous areas in western North America, and was found in a Brazilian dune in 2008. It is edible when young, before the spores inside the fruit body disintegrate into a brownish powder.

== Taxonomy ==
The species was first described in 1885 by American mycologist Harvey Willson Harkness, under the name Lycoperdon sculptum. Harkness, who called it "a curious and strikingly beautiful species", found fruit bodies growing at elevations between 6,000 and 8,000 feet (1,800 and 2,400 m) in the Sierra Nevada mountains. Although he noted that "in appearance it differs so much from any species known to us, as to be almost deemed worthy of generic rank", he thought that placement in the puffball genus Lycoperdon was the most appropriate classification, despite its unusual cortex. Harkness's type collections were destroyed in the fires following the 1906 San Francisco earthquake. In 1904, Curtis Gates Lloyd considered the species better placed in Calvatia, because of the resemblance of its deeply colored capillitial threads (coarse thick-walled cells found in the gleba) to those of Calvatia caelata; (Note: Depending on the authority consulted, Calvatia caelata is currently known as either Lycoperdon utriforme, Calvatia utriformis, or Handkea utriformis.) he called the species Calvatia sculptum. The mushroom is known by several common names, including the "sculpted puffball", the "sculptured puffball", the "pyramid puffball", and the "Sierran puffball".

In 1992, German mycologist Hanns Kreisel, in his survey of the genus Calvatia, defined the section Sculpta to contain C. sculpta and C. subcretacea. Two years later he merged the section Cretacea into Sculpta when it was shown that C. subcretacea was synonymous with the arctic-alpine species C. arctica.

== Description ==
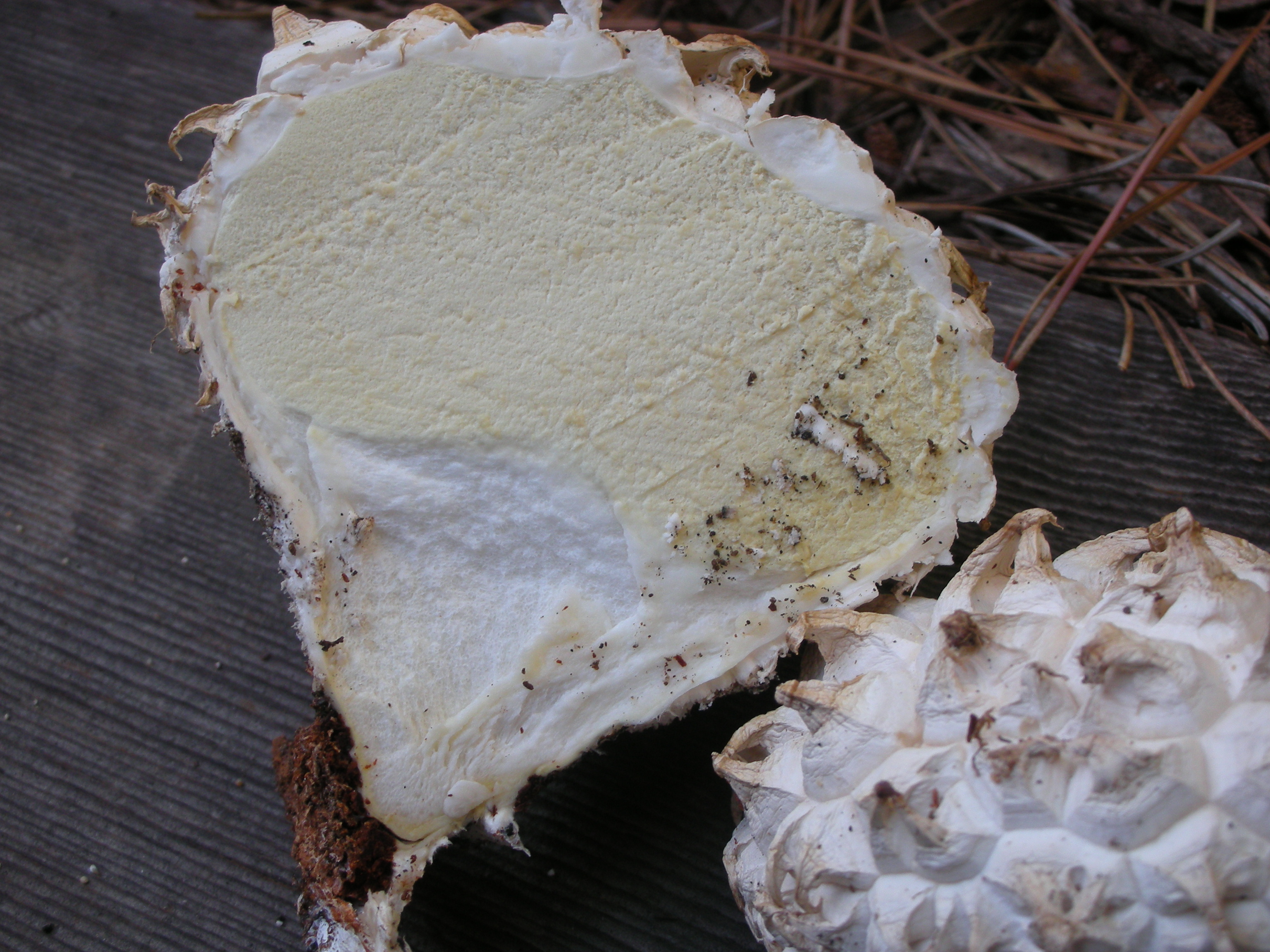
The gleba of young fruit bodies are firm and yellowish-white.

The white pear- or egg-shaped fruit body of C. sculpta may be 8 to 15 cm (3 to 6 in) tall by 8 to 10 cm (3 to 4 in) wide. The outer layer of tissue, known as the exoperidium, is covered on the outer surface with distinctive long, pointed, pyramid-shaped warts, either erect or bent over and sometimes connected at the tip with other warts. The warts bear parallel horizontal lines towards the base. Mycologist David Arora opined that C. sculpta resembles "a cross between a geodesic dome and a giant glob of meringue". In age, the peridium sloughs off and exposes a brownish spore mass. The interior of the puffball, the gleba, is firm and yellowish-white when young, but gradually becomes powdery and deep olive-brown as it matures.

The spores are roughly spherical, thick-walled, 3–6 μm in diameter (although some specimens collected in the US range from 7.2 to 9.5 μm), and are covered with minute spines or warts. The use of scanning electron microscopy has revealed that these ornamentations on the spores are typically 0.95 μm long. Spore ultrastructure is distinctive among Calvatia species, and has been used to help verify taxonomic groupings and confirm the status of species within the genus. The capillitia (coarse, thick-walled hyphae in the gleba) are septate, with branches that are narrowed towards the tips; they are 3–8 μm in diameter. When grown in pure culture in the laboratory, C. sculpta is, under certain conditions, able to grow structures called mycelial strands. These are linear aggregates of hyphae whereby older "leading" hyphae become enclosed by coiled layers of newer "tendril" hyphae. Mycelial strands provide a conduit for transporting water and nutrients across non-nutrient material, allowing the fungus to reach new sources of food. They are also implicated in the formation of fruit bodies and sclerotia. The mycelia of C. sculpta can be induced to form mycelial strands when there is a permeable physical barrier between it and the agar substrate. The wide hyphae in the center of the mycelial strands contain protein-dense structures on their cell walls that are shaped like a torus. Their function is unknown.

=== Edibility ===
Calvatia sculpta is edible and said to be "choice" by some authors. The taste is described as "mild" and the flesh has no distinguishable odor. Arora recommends eating the puffball only when it is firm and white inside, as older specimens may have a distasteful iodine-like flavor. The puffball may be preserved by freezing fresh or partially cooked slices, but their flavor and texture will deteriorate unless cooked immediately after thawing. Recommended cooking techniques for puffball slices include sautéing and coating in batter before frying. C. sculpta was used as a traditional food of the Plains and Sierra Miwok Indians of North America, who called the fungus potokele or patapsi. Puffballs were prepared by drying them in the sun, grinding them with a mortar, and boiling them before eating with acorn soup.

=== Similar species ===
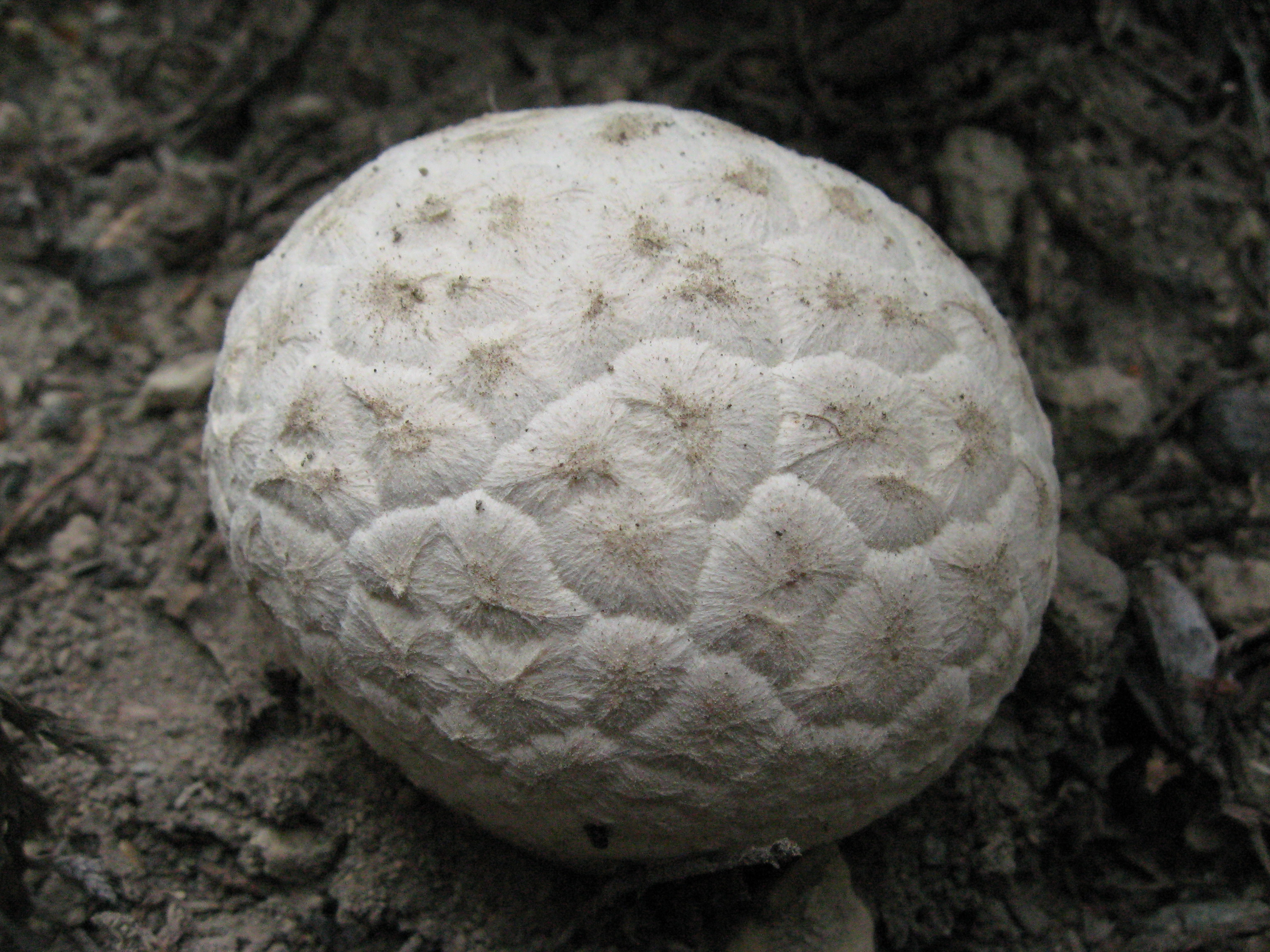
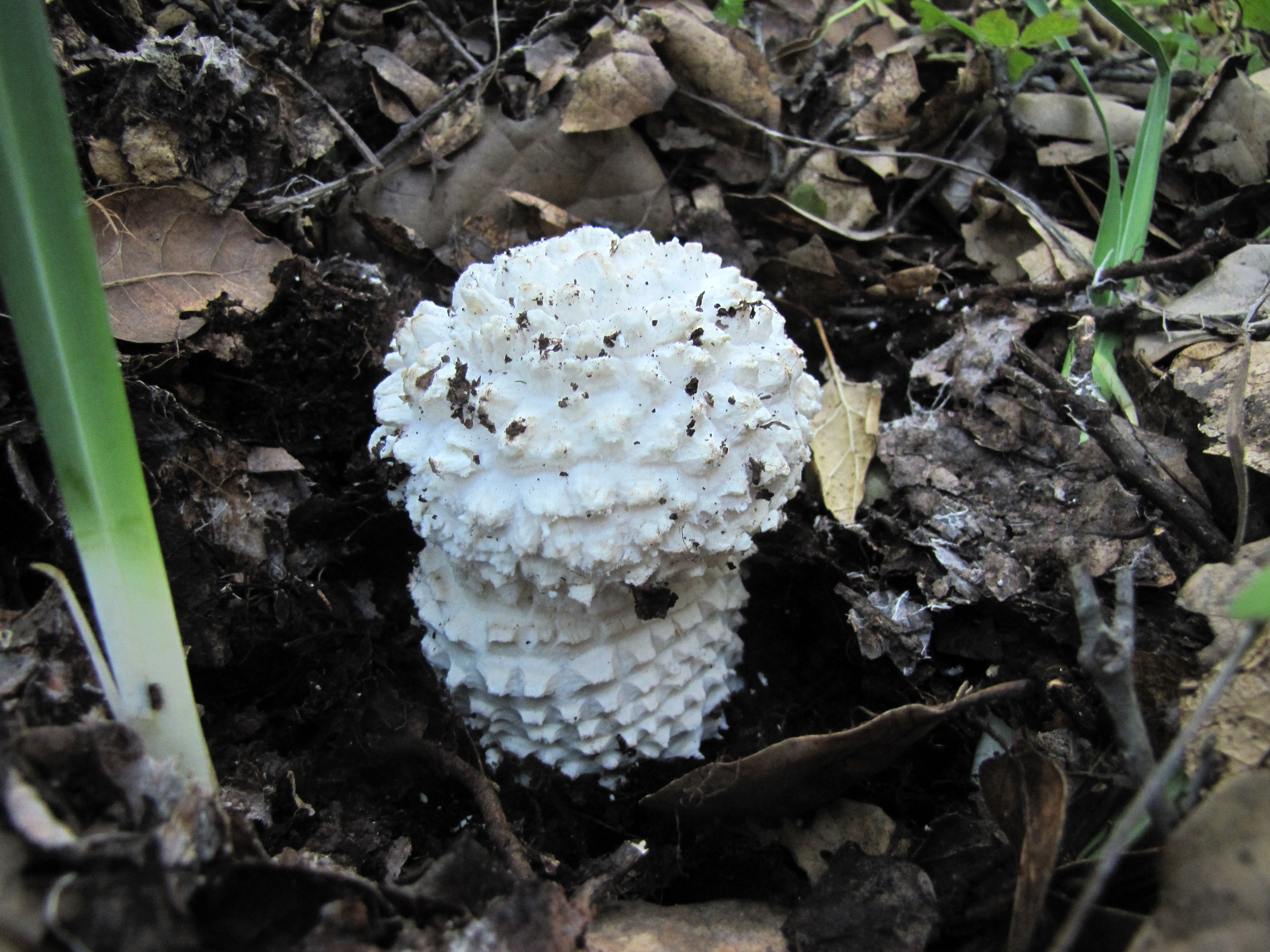
Lookalike species include Calbovista subsculpta (left) and Amanita magniverrucata (right).

The giant western puffball, Calvatia booniana, is much larger than C. sculpta—up to 60 cm (24 in) in diameter and 30 cm (12 in) tall—and has a smoother surface. Mature specimens of Calvatia arctica (synonymous with Calvatia subcretacea, Gastropila subcretacea, and Handkea subcretacea) can resemble immature specimens of C. sculpta. It is distinguished from C. sculpta by its tough, thicker peridial wall, and its scales are tipped with gray-brown. Calbovista subsculpta is similar in appearance, but has more flattened and less prominent pyramidal warts. Microscopically, its capillitia are thin-walled and frequently and irregularly branched, in contrast to the thick-walled infrequently branched capillitia of C. sculpta. The "possibly toxic" Amanita magniverrucata, in its embryonic stage, has a superficial resemblance as it also has pyramidal cap warts. However, it grows at different elevations and different seasons than C. sculpta. Further, slicing the fruit body of A. magniverrucata in half will reveal internal structures of cap, gills and stem not present in puffballs.

== Habitat and distribution ==
The sculptured puffball grows solitarily or in small groups in forest duff. It is typically associated with coniferous forests at high elevations, greater than about 750 m (2,500 ft), on western mountains like the Sierra Nevada and the Cascade Range. The United States distribution includes the states of California, Oregon, Washington, and Idaho. An uncommon species, it fruits throughout spring, summer, and fall during wet weather.

Most commonly known from western North America, the species was reported growing on sandy soil in Natal Dunes State Park in the northeastern Brazilian state of Rio Grande do Norte in 2008. The fruit bodies were associated with the roots of the native tree species Eugenia brasiliensis. Several hypotheses have been proposed to account for this disjunct distribution: the species may have been present before the Americas separated; it may have been introduced to Brazil by human activity, and subsequently adapted to the environment there; or the North and South American populations may represent a cryptic species complex—appearing morphologically similar but genetically distinct. The Brazilian population has not been compared genetically with North American specimens.
