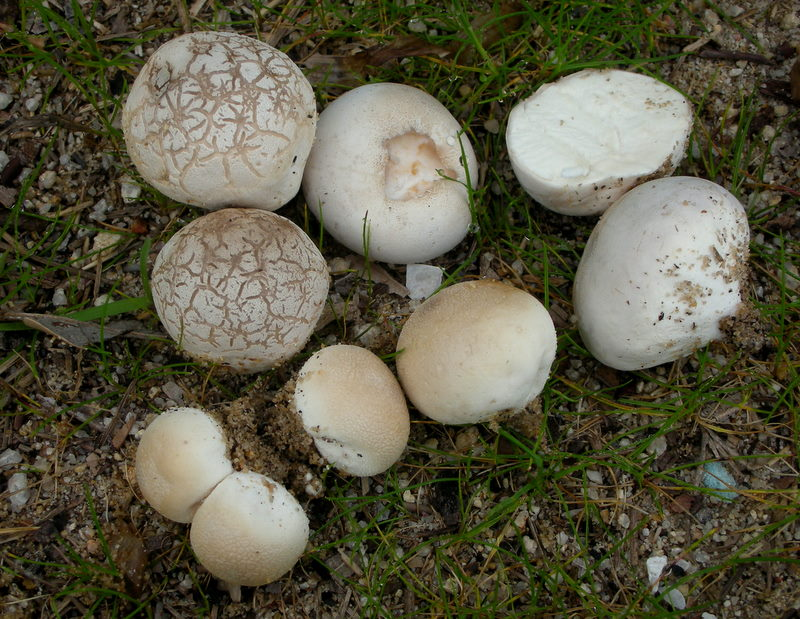

Scientific classification
- Kingdom: Fungi
- Division: Basidiomycota
- Class: Agaricomycetes
- Order: Agaricales
- Family: Lycoperdaceae
- Genus: Bovista
- Species: B. aestivalis

Binomial name
- Bovista aestivalis (Bonord.) Demoulin (1979)

= Bovista aestivalis =

Species of fungus

- Mycological characteristics
- Glebal hymenium
- No distinct cap
- Hymenium attachment is not applicable
- Lacks a stipe
- Spore print is yellow-brown
- Ecology is saprotrophic
- Edibility is edible

Bovista aestivalis is a species of small puffball in the family Agaricaceae. It is generally found in the coastal regions of California, but was reported from Korea in 2015. This fungus is often confused with Bovista dermoxantha, because of its similar peridium, and Bovista plumbea. The surest way to tell the species apart is to examine the spores and exoperidium, respectively, with a microscope.

== Description ==
The fruit body is 1.5–3.0 cm broad and varies in shape from spherical to pulvinate (cushion-shaped). It is attached to the substrate by dense masses of hyphae. At first, the exoperidium is white; originally covered in dense filaments, it breaks up into buff, fine warts. With age, a brown, thin endoperidium becomes exposed underneath. The spores are released through a ragged pore at the top of the puffball. The gleba is soft, changing from white, to olive and eventually medium-brown.

The spherical| spores are 3.5–4.5 μm in diameter and moderately thick-walled with smooth warts. In the center lies an oil droplet and a stub-like pedicel. In addition, there is a capillitium from the central part of the gleba with numerous minute pits.

=== Habitat ===
Bovista aestivalis is generally scattered and/or in small groups on edges of grassy areas along paths. They can also be found in coastal dunes among herbs and shrubs. When watered, they will fruit during the summer months and throughout the autumn and winter after periods of rain. Because of their small size, they are often inconspicuous; despite their edibility, they are often too small to be of value.

== Taxonomy ==
The puffball was first described scientifically in 1851 by German mycologist Hermann Friedrich Bonorden with the name Lycoperdon aestivale. Vincent Demoulin transferred it to the genus Bovista in 1979. Obsolete synonyms for Bovista aestivalis include Bovista cepiformis (Bull.) Massee, Globaria furfuraceum (Schaeff.) Quel. 1873, Lycoperdon aestivale Bonord. 1851, Lycoperdon cepiforme Bull. 1791, Lycoperdon ericetorum var. cepiforme (Bull.) Bowerman 1961, and Lycoperdon furfuraceum Schaeff. 1770. The specific epithet, aestivalis, is derived from Latin and means "pertaining to the summer".
