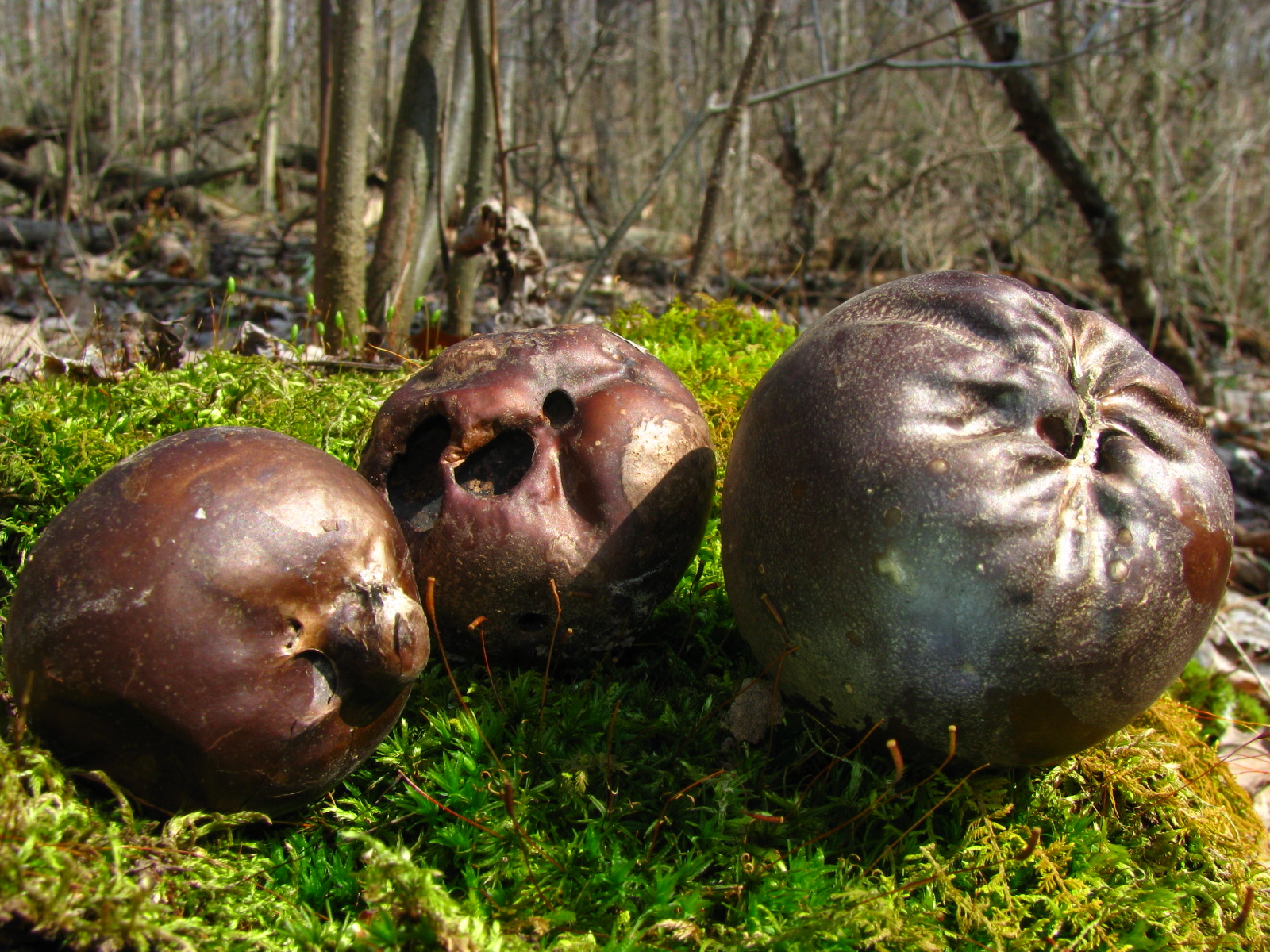

Scientific classification
- Domain: Eukaryota
- Kingdom: Fungi
- Division: Basidiomycota
- Class: Agaricomycetes
- Order: Agaricales
- Family: Lycoperdaceae
- Genus: Bovista
- Species: B. pila

Binomial name
- Bovista pila Berk. & M.A.Curtis (1873)

Synonyms
- Bovista tabacina Sacc. (1882); Mycenastrum oregonense Ellis & Everh. (1885); Bovista montana Morgan (1892)

= Bovista pila =

Species of fungus

Bovista pila, commonly known as the tumbling puffball, is a species of puffball fungus in the family Lycoperdaceae.

The puffballs are initially attached to the ground by a small cord that readily breaks off, leaving the mature puffball to be blown about. The egg-shaped to spherical puffball of B. pila measures up to 8 cm (3 in) in diameter. Its white outer skin flakes off in age to reveal a shiny, bronze-colored inner skin that encloses a spore sac. The spores are more or less spherical, with short tube-like extensions. B. pila closely resembles the European B. nigrescens, from which it can be reliably distinguished only by microscopic characteristics.

A temperate species, B. pila is widely distributed in North America, where it grows on the ground on road sides, in pastures, grassy areas, and open woods. There are few well-documented occurrences outside of North America. Young B. pila puffballs are edible while their internal tissue is still white and firm. They have been used as a charm by the Chippewa people of North America, and as an ethnoveterinary medicine for livestock farming in western Canada.

== Taxonomy ==
The species was described as new to science in 1873 by Miles Joseph Berkeley and Moses Ashley Curtis, from specimens collected in Wisconsin. In their short description, they emphasize the short pedicels (tube-like extensions) on the spores, and indicate that these pedicels—initially about as long as the spore is wide—soon break off. According to the nomenclatural authority MycoBank, taxonomic synonyms (i.e., having different type specimens) include Pier Andrea Saccardo's 1882 Bovista tabacina, Job Bicknell Ellis and Benjamin Matlack Everhart's 1885 Mycenastrum oregonense, and Andrew Price Morgan's 1892 Bovista montana. William Chambers Coker and John Nathaniel Couch called B. pila "the American representative of B. nigrescens in Europe", referring to their close resemblance.

Bovista pila is commonly known as the tumbling puffball, referring to the propensity of detached puffballs to be blown about by the wind. The specific epithet pila is Latin for "ball".

== Description ==
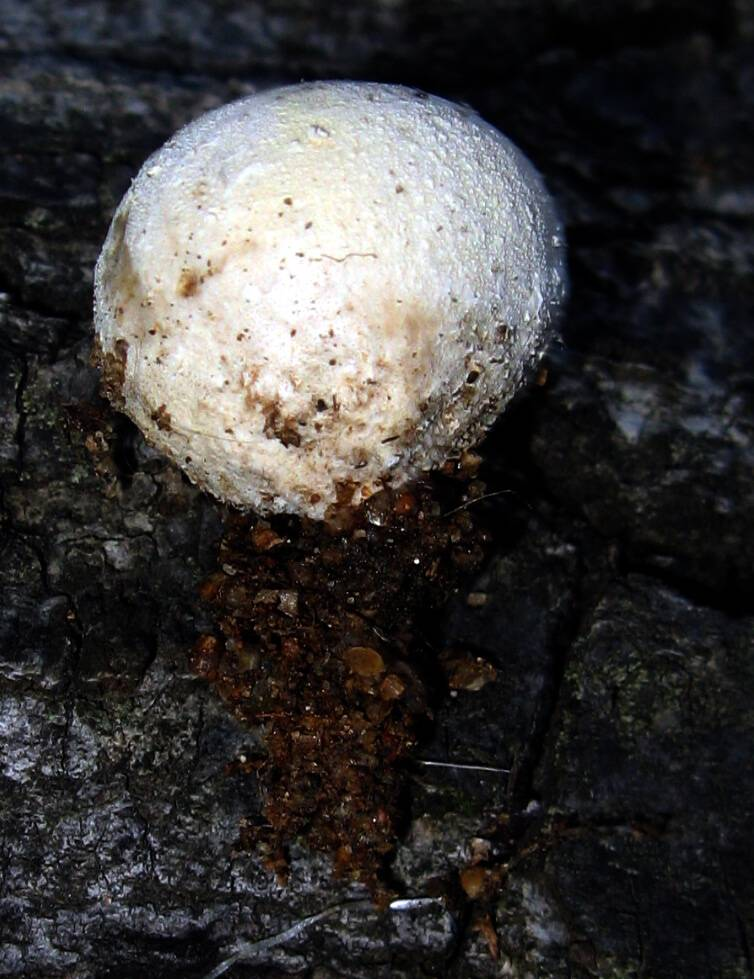
Young fruit body before the outer peridium sloughs off

B. pila has an egg-shaped to roughly spherical fruit body measuring up to 8 cm (3 in) in diameter. The thin (0.25 millimeter) outer tissue layer (exoperidium) is white to slightly pink. Its surface texture, initially appearing as if covered with minute flakes of bran (furfuraceous), becomes marked with irregular, crooked lines (rivulose). The exoperidium flakes off in maturity to reveal a thin, inner peridium (endoperidium). The color of this shiny inner skin, splotched with darker areas, resembles the metallic colors of bronze and copper. Bovista pila puffballs are attached to the ground by a small cord (a rhizomorph) that typically breaks off when the puffball is mature. The interior flesh, or gleba, comprises spores and surrounding capillitial tissue. Initially white and firm with tiny, irregularly shaped chambers (visible with a magnifying glass), the gleba later becomes greenish and then brown and powdery as the spores mature. In age, the upper surface of the puffball cracks and tears open. The resilient texture of the inner peridium enables the puffball to maintain its ball-like shape after it has detached from the ground. As the old puffballs get blown around, spores get shaken out of the tears.

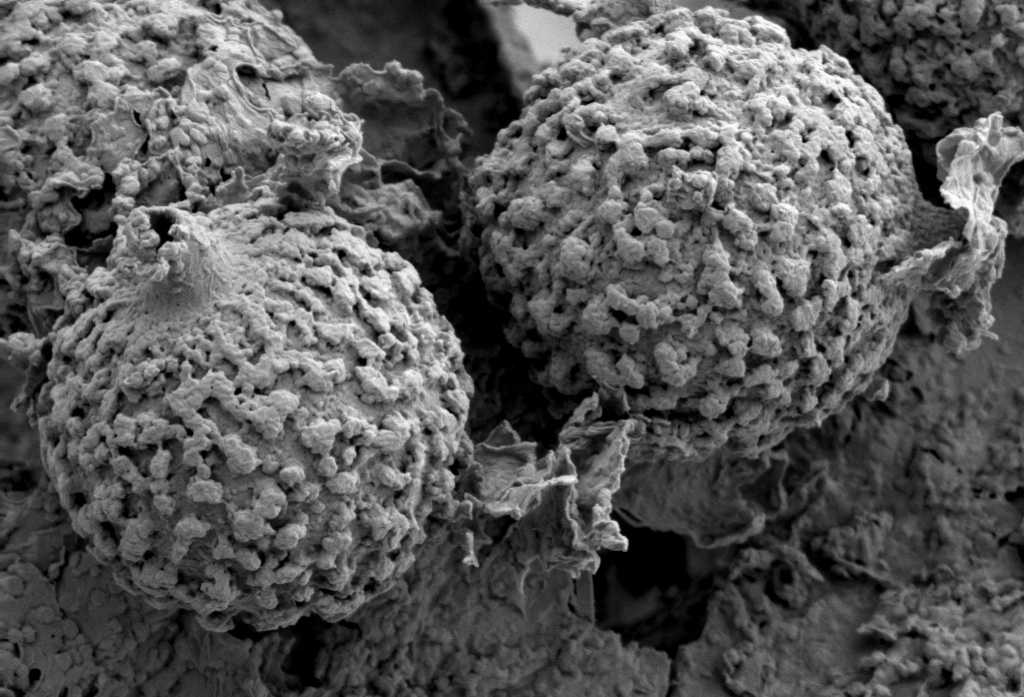
Short pedicels are a characteristic of B. pila spores.

The spores of Bovista pila are spherical, smooth (when viewed with a light microscope), and measure 3.5–4.5 μm. They have thick walls and very short pedicels. Basidia (spore-bearing cells) are club-shaped, measuring 8–10.5 by 14–18 μm. They are usually four-spored (rarely, some are three-spored), with unequal length sterigmata between 4 and 7.4 μm. The capillitia (sterile fibers interspersed among the spores) tend to form loose balls about 2 mm in diameter. The main, trunk-like branches of the capillitia are up to 15 μm in diameter, with walls that are typically 2–3 μm thick.

=== Similar species ===
Characteristics typically used to identify Bovista pila in the field include its relatively small size, the metallic lustre of the endoperidium, and the presence of rhizomorphs. B. plumbea is similar in appearance, but can be distinguished by its typically smaller fruit body and the blue-gray color of its inner coat. Unlike B. pila, B. plumbea is attached to the ground by a mass of mycelial fibers known as a sterile base. Microscopically, B. plumbea has larger spores (5–7 by 4.5–6.0 μm); with long pedicels (9–14 μm). Another lookalike is the European B. nigrescens, which can most reliably be distinguished from B. pila by its microscopic characteristics. The spores of B. nigrescens are oval rather than spherical, rougher than those of B. pila, and have a hyaline (translucent) pedicel about equal in length to the spore diameter (5 μm). The puffball Disciseda pila was named for its external resemblance to B. pila. Found in Texas and Argentina, it has much larger, warted spores that measure 7.9–9.4 μm.

== Habitat and distribution ==
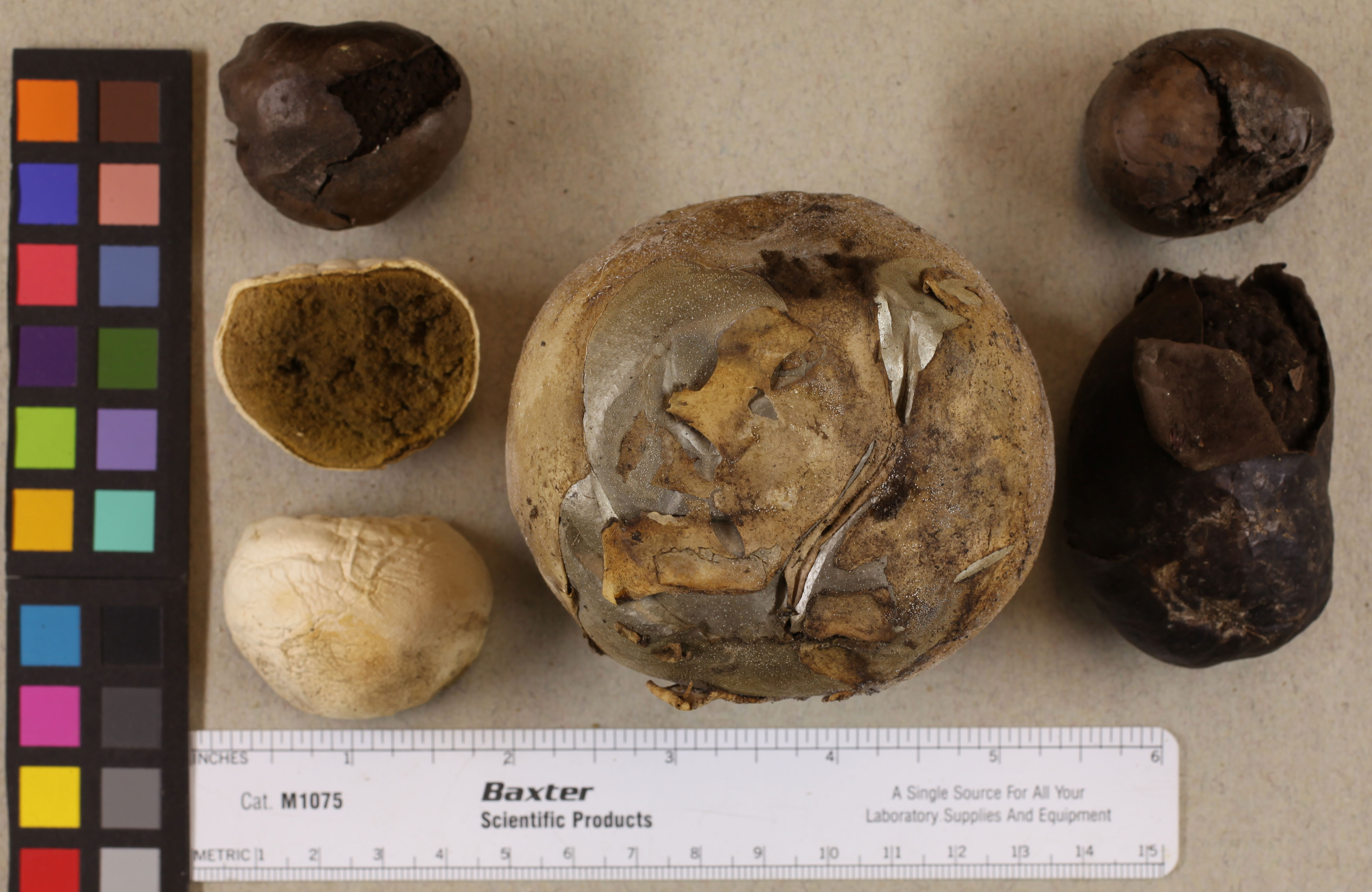
A collection of several specimens from California

Bovista pila is found in corrals, stables, roadsides, pastures and open woods. The puffballs fruit singly, scattered, or in groups on the ground. It is also known to grow in lawns and parks. The puffball spore cases are persistent and may overwinter. Fruiting occurs throughout the mushroom season.

Bovista pila is widely distributed in North America (including Hawaii). There are few well-documented occurrences of B. pila outside North America. Hanns Kreisel recorded it from Russia, in what is now known as the Sakha Republic. The puffball has been tentatively identified from the Galápagos Islands, and has been collected from Pernambuco and São Paulo, Brazil. The South American material, however, has grayish-yellow coloration in the gleba, which may be indicative of not yet fully matured specimens. This renders identification of this material tentative, as unripe material may have different microscopic characteristics from mature material. Although the puffball has been reported from both the European part of Turkey as well as Anatolia, reports without supporting microscopic or macroscopic information are viewed with skepticism.

== Uses ==
Edible when the interior gleba is still firm and white, Bovista pila puffballs have a mild taste and odor.

The puffball was used by the Chippewa people of North America as a charm, and medicinally as a hemostat. In British Columbia, Canada, it is used by livestock farmers who are not allowed to use conventional drugs under certified organic programs. The spore mass of the puffball is applied to bleeding hoof trimming 'nicks', and then wrapped with breathable first-aid tape. It is also similarly used on bleeding areas resulting from disbudding, and wounds resulting from sternal abscesses.
