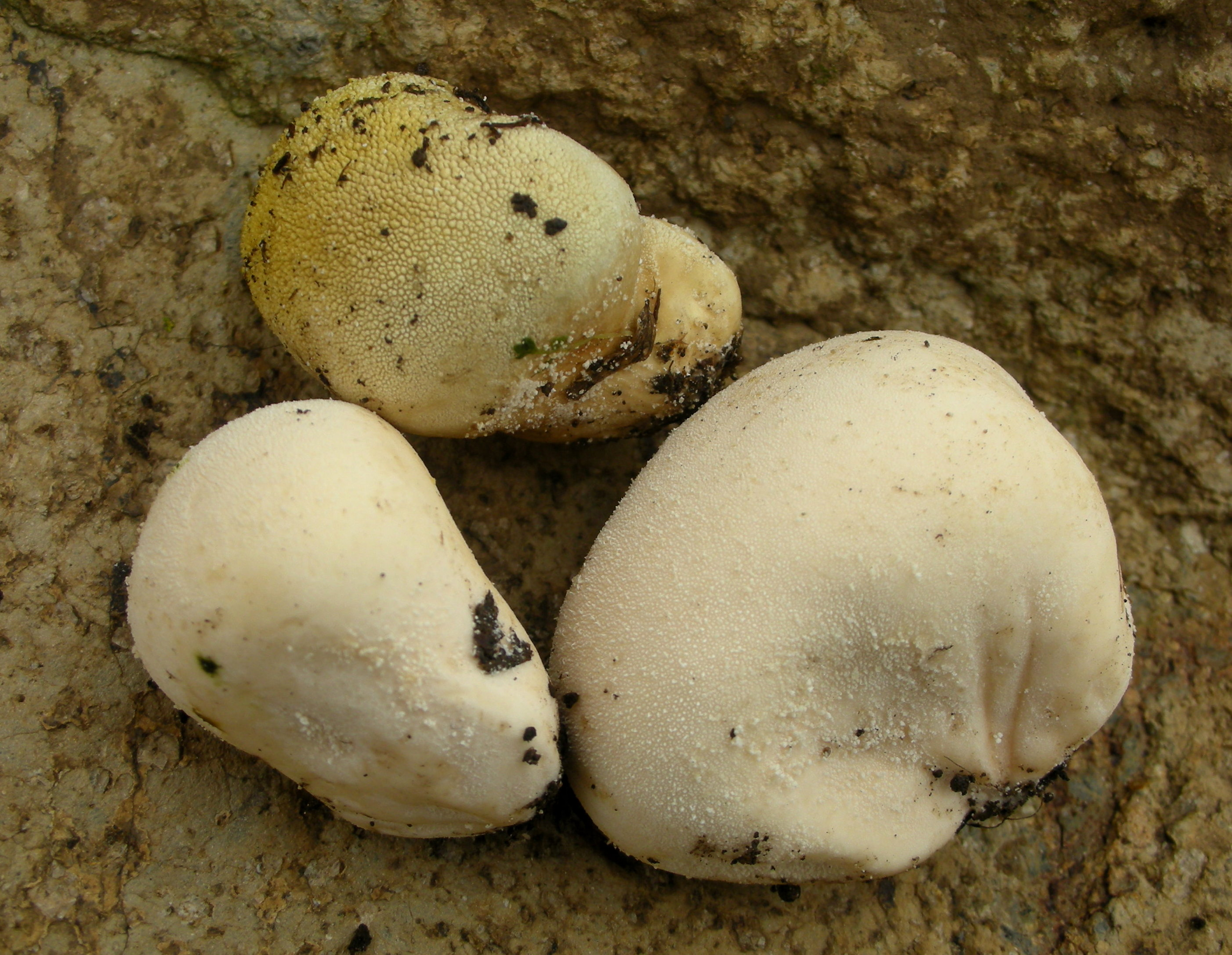
- Vascellum lloydianum

Scientific classification
- Kingdom: Fungi
- Division: Basidiomycota
- Class: Agaricomycetes
- Order: Agaricales
- Family: Agaricaceae
- Genus: Vascellum; F.Šmarda (1958)

Type species
- Vascellum depressum (Bonord.) F.Šmarda (1958)

Synonyms
- Lycoperdon subgen. Vascellum (F.Šmarda) Jeppson & E.Larss. (2008)

= Vascellum =

Genus of fungi

Vascellum is a genus of puffball fungi in the family Agaricaceae. The genus was defined by Czech mycologist František Šmarda in 1958.

== Species ==
- Vascellum abscissum (R.E.Fr.) Kreisel 1962 – South America
- Vascellum angulatum (Dissing & M.Lange) P.Ponce de León 1970
- Vascellum cingulatum Homrich 1988 – South America
- Vascellum cruciatum (Rostk.) P.Ponce de León 1970 – Europe, North America, South America
- Vascellum cuzcoense Homrich 1988 – South America
- Vascellum delicatum Homrich 1988 – South America
- Vascellum djurense (Henn.) P.Ponce de León 1970 – Africa
- Vascellum endotephrum (Pat.) Demoulin & Dring 1975 – Africa
- Vascellum floridanum A.H.Sm. 1974 – United States
- Vascellum hyalinum Homrich 1988 – South America
- Vascellum intermedium A.H.Sm. 1974 – United States
- Vascellum lloydianum A.H.Sm. 1974 – United States
- Vascellum pampeanum (Speg.) Homrich 1988 – South America
- Vascellum qudenii (Bottomley) P.Ponce de León 1970
- Vascellum rhodesianum (Verwoerd) P.Ponce de León 1970
- Vascellum texense A.H.Sm. 1974 – United States
- Vascellum vanderystii (Bres.) P.Ponce de León 1970

== See also ==
- List of Agaricales genera
- List of Agaricaceae genera
