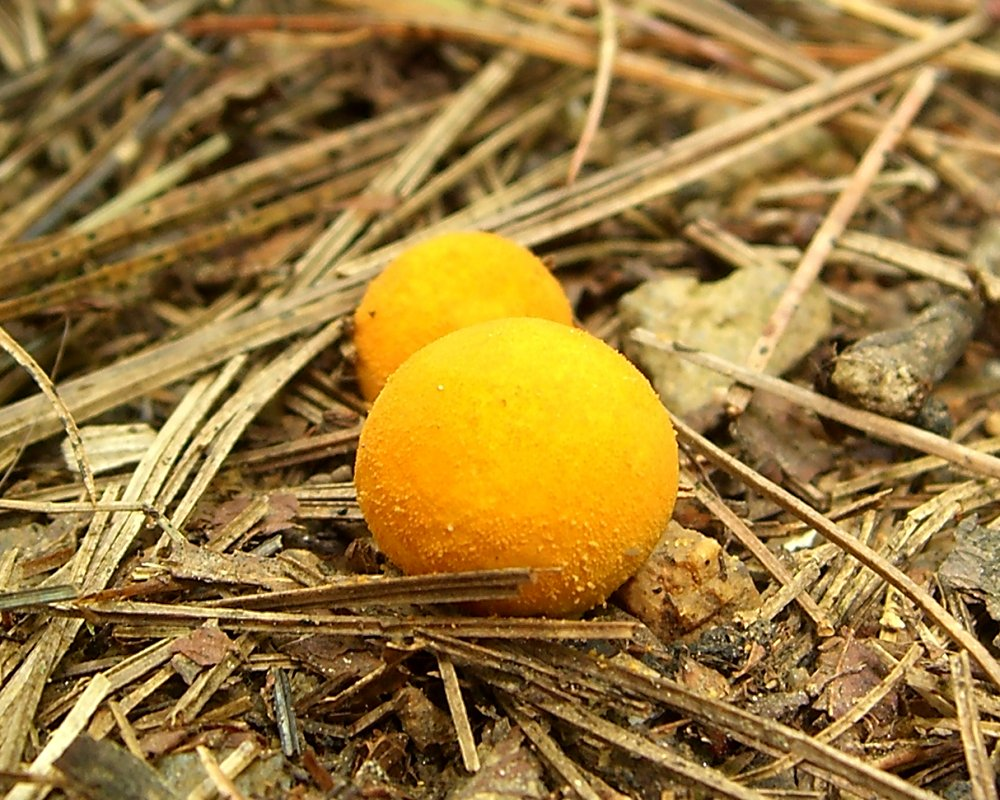

Scientific classification
- Domain: Eukaryota
- Kingdom: Fungi
- Division: Basidiomycota
- Class: Agaricomycetes
- Order: Agaricales
- Family: Lycoperdaceae
- Genus: Bovista
- Species: B. colorata

Binomial name
- Bovista colorata (Peck) Kreisel (1964)

Synonyms
- Lycoperdon coloratum Peck (1878)

= Bovista colorata =

Species of fungus

Bovista colorata is a species of puffball fungus in the family Agaricaceae. It is found in eastern North America and northwestern South America. The puffball was first described as Lycoperdon coloratum by Charles Horton Peck in 1878, from collections made in Sand Lake, New York. Hanns Kreisel transferred it to the genus Bovista by in 1964. The golden to orange-yellow fruitbodies are 13–30 cm (5.1–11.8 in) in diameter. Its spores are spherical, measuring 3.5–5 μm in diameter.
