= Bovista paludosa =

Scientific classification
- Kingdom: Fungi
- Division: Basidiomycota
- Class: Agaricomycetes
- Order: Agaricales
- Family: Lycoperdaceae
- Genus: Bovista
- Species: B. paludosa

Binomial name
- Bovista paludosa Lév., 1846

Species of fungus

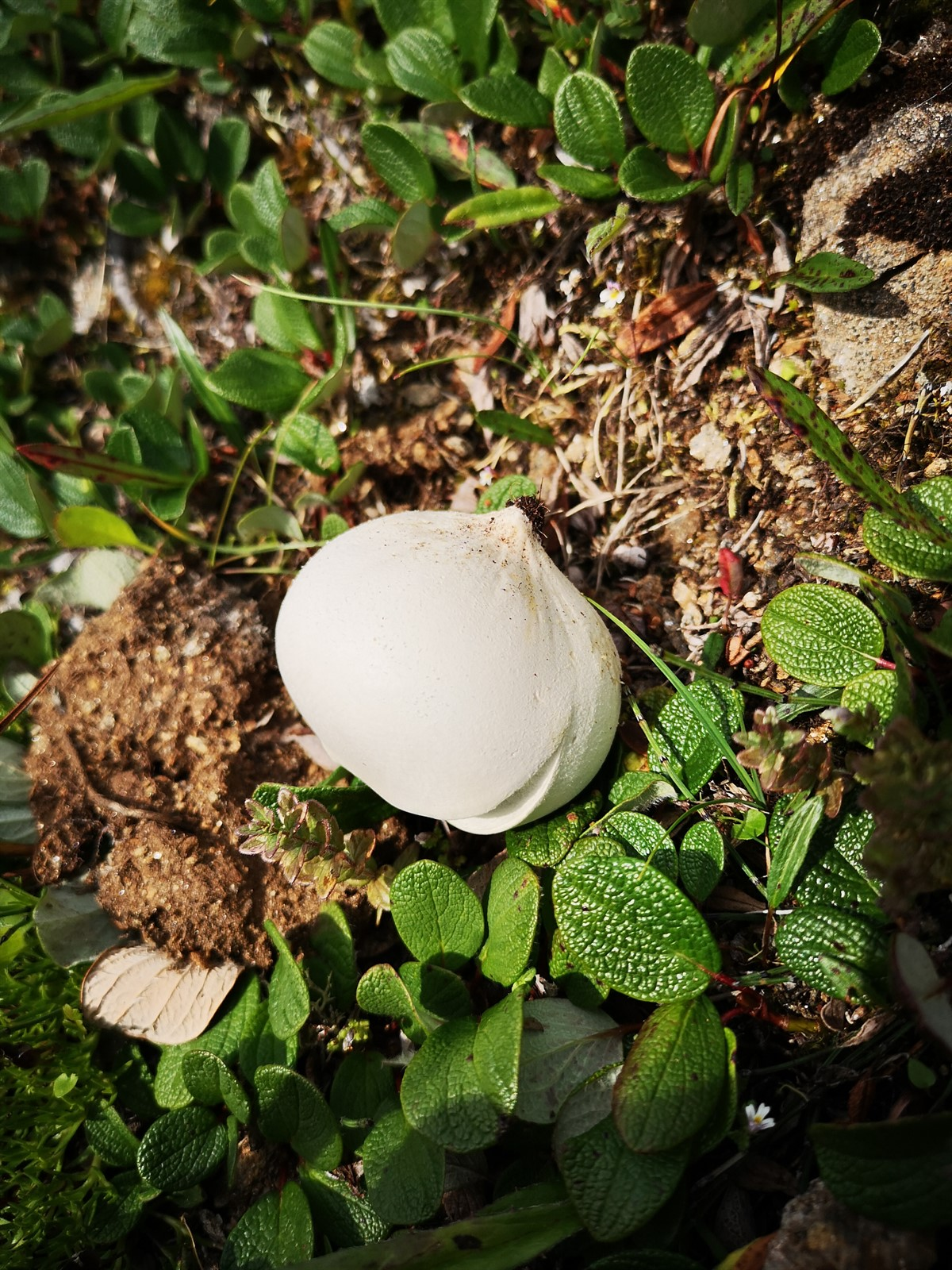
Bovista paludosa

Bovista paludosa is a species of fungus belonging to the family Lycoperdaceae.

It is native to Eurasia.
