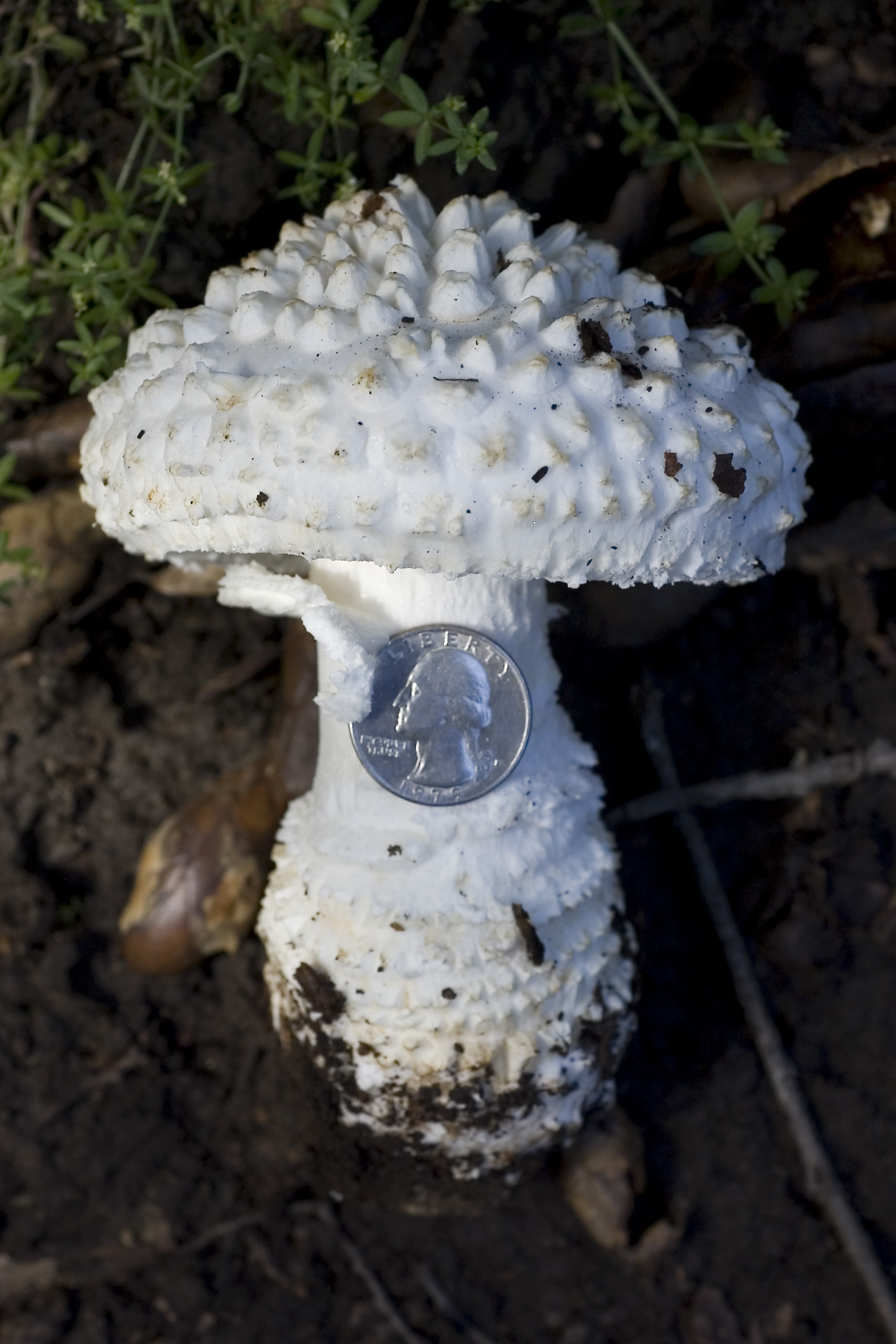
- Young specimen

Conservation status
- Least Concern (IUCN 3.1)

Scientific classification
- Kingdom: Fungi
- Division: Basidiomycota
- Class: Agaricomycetes
- Order: Agaricales
- Family: Amanitaceae
- Genus: Amanita
- Species: A. magniverrucata

Binomial name
- Amanita magniverrucata Thiers & Ammirati

= Amanita magniverrucata =

Species of fungus

Amanita magniverrucata
- Mycological characteristics
- Gills on hymenium
- Cap is convex or flat
- Hymenium is free or adnate
- Stipe has a ring and volva
- Spore print is white
- Ecology is mycorrhizal
- Edibility is unknown or poisonous

Amanita magniverrucata, commonly known as the pine cone amanita, or great pine jewel, is a species of agaric mushroom in the family Amanitaceae.

== Taxonomy ==
It was first described scientifically by American mycologists Harry Delbert Thiers and Joseph Ammirati in 1982.

== Description ==
It is a whitish mushroom. The cap is typically up to 20 centimetres (8 in) wide with dark scales. The gills are very close. The stem is about 7–13 cm (3–5 in) long. The smell is mild but unpleasant in age and the spore print is white. While its edibility is unknown, it may be poisonous, as are other Amanitas in the same subgroup.

Although there are a number of lookalike species, its large warts are a distinguishing feature.

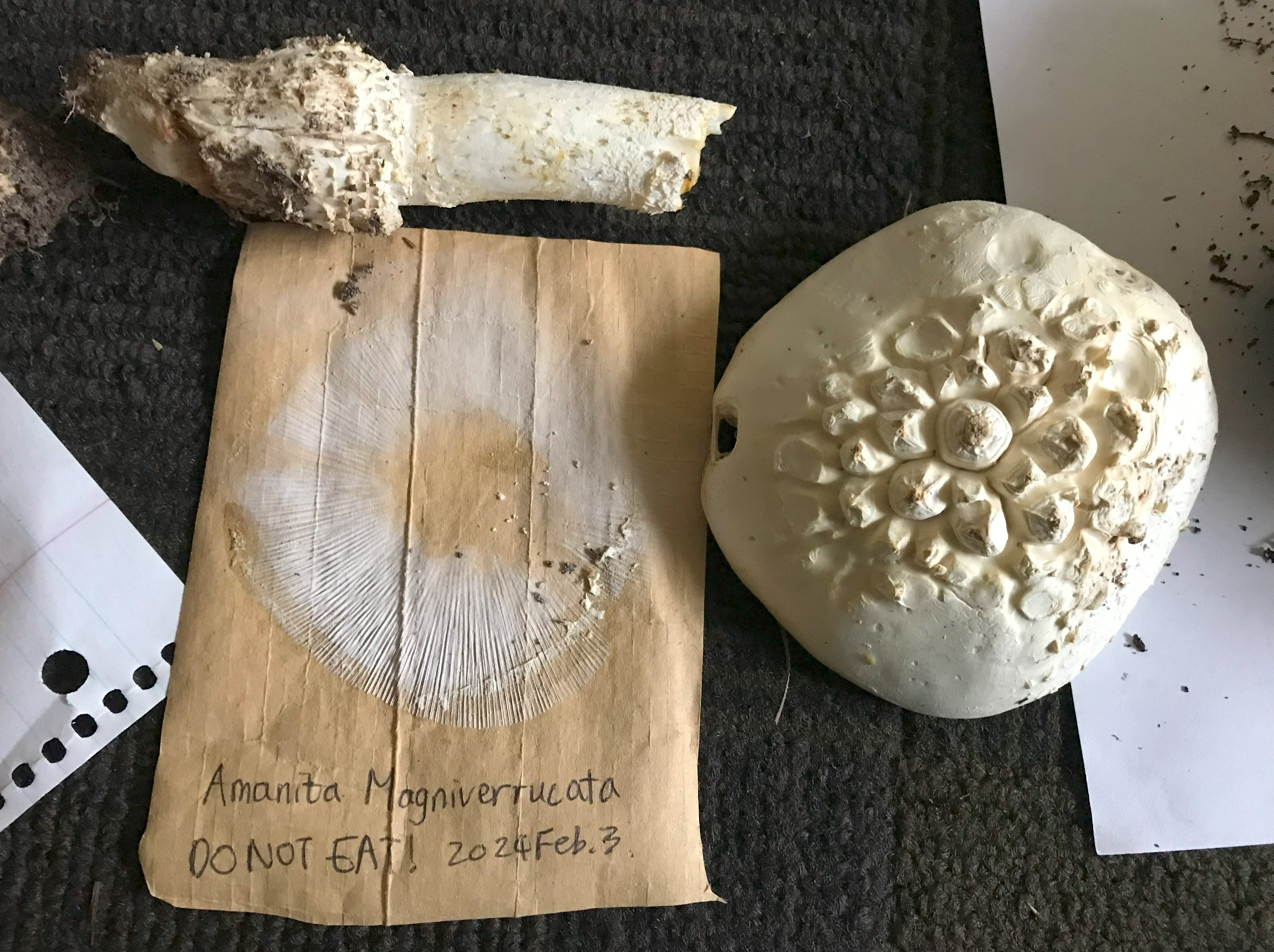
Spore print

== Ecology ==
It is mycorrhizal and associates with the tree Pinus radiata (the Monterey pine).

== See also ==
- List of Amanita species
