= Calvatia sporocristata =

Scientific classification
- Domain: Eukaryota
- Kingdom: Fungi
- Division: Basidiomycota
- Class: Agaricomycetes
- Order: Agaricales
- Family: Agaricaceae
- Genus: Calvatia
- Species: C. sporocristata

Binomial name
- Calvatia sporocristata Calonge (2003)

Species of fungus

Calvatia sporocristata is a species of puffball in the family Agaricaceae. Found in Costa Rica, it was described as new to science in 2003 by Spanish mycologist Francisco D. Calonge. Fruit bodies are top-shaped to roughly spherical, measuring 13–30 cm (5–12 in) by 12–25 cm (5–10 in). The outermost tissue layer, the exoperidium, is brown and has a cork-like texture; the endoperidium is thin and paperlike. Inside the puffball, the gleba is initially yellowish-brown before changing to dark brown and woolly as the spores mature. The specific epithet sporocristata refers to the crest-forming spines on the spores. Similar Calvatia species include C. lepidophara and C. longicauda, but these lookalikes can be readily distinguished from C. sporocristata by differences in spore ornamentation.
