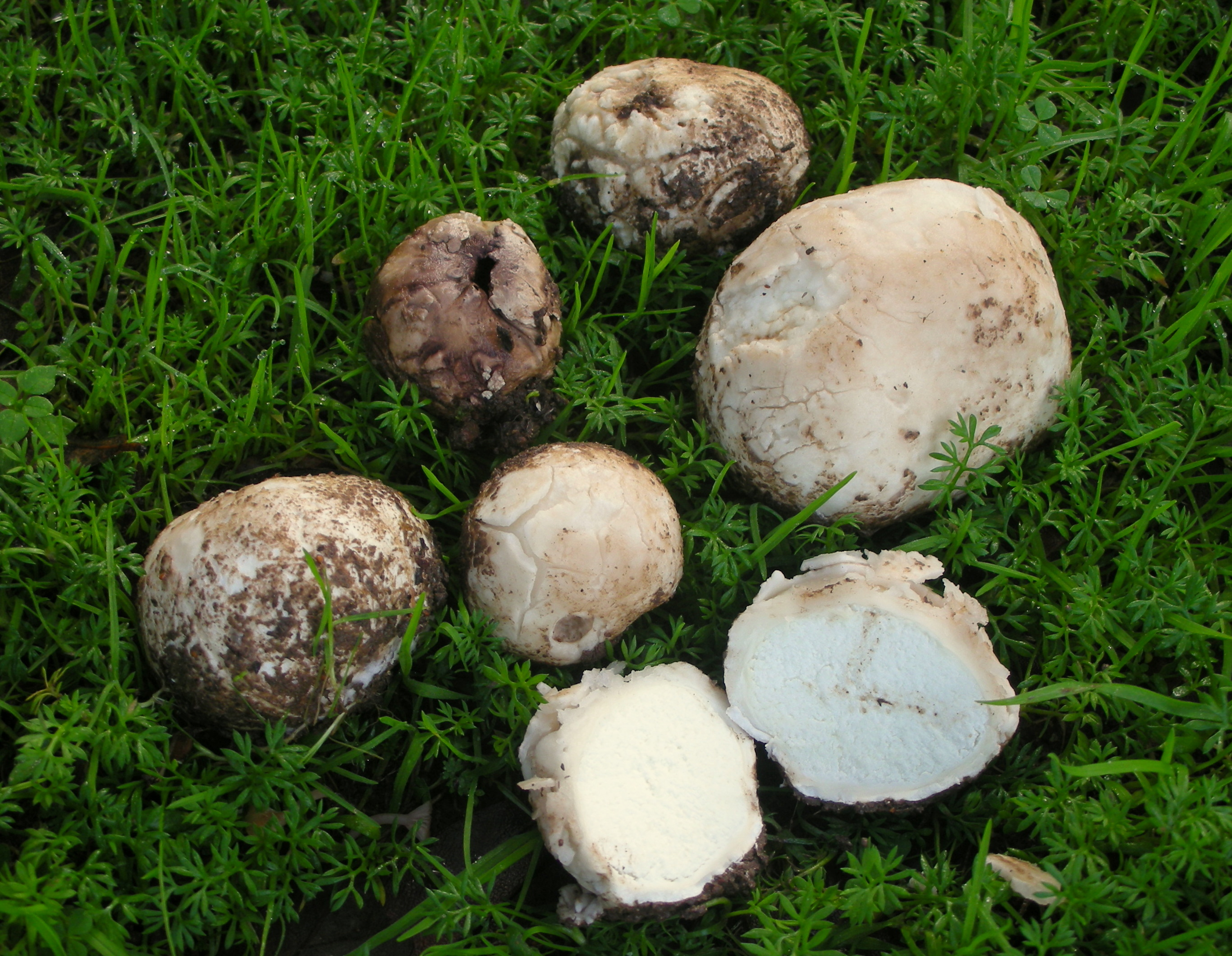
- Bovista plumbea

Scientific classification
- Kingdom: Fungi
- Division: Basidiomycota
- Class: Agaricomycetes
- Order: Agaricales
- Family: Lycoperdaceae
- Genus: Bovista; Pers. (1794)

Type species
- Bovista plumbea Pers. (1795)

Synonyms
- Piesmycus Raf. (1808); Piemycus Raf. (1813); Sackea Rostk. (1844); Globaria Quél. (1873); Pseudolycoperdon Velen. (1947)

= Bovista =

Genus of fungi

Bovista is a genus of fungi commonly known as the true puffballs. It was formerly classified within the now-obsolete order Lycoperdales, which, following a restructuring of fungal taxonomy brought about by molecular phylogeny, has been split; the species of Bovista are now placed in the family Agaricaceae of the order Agaricales. Bovista species have a collectively widespread distribution, and are found largely in temperate regions of the world. Various species have historically been used in homeopathic preparations.

== Description ==
Fruit bodies are oval to spherical to pear-shaped, and typically 1 to 8 cm (0.4 to 3.1 in) in diameter with a white or light-colored thin and fragile exoperidium (outer layer of the peridium). Depending on the species, the exoperidium in a young specimen may be smooth, granular, or finely echinulate. This exoperidium sloughs off at maturity to expose a smooth endoperidium with a single apical pore (ostiole). The fruit bodies may be attached to the ground by fine rhizomorphs that may appear like a small cord. Some species develop a subgleba—a sterile base that is typically not well developed. The fruit bodies of mature specimens can develop surface alterations such as scales, plates, areolae, or verrucae. At the microscopic level, these features are made of hyphae, sphaerocysts (rounded cells), claviform (club-shaped) cells. Bovista sclerocystis is the only species in the genus with mycosclereids (setoid elements) in the peridium.

Spores are brown to purple-brown, roughly spherical or ellipsoid in shape, and 3.5–7 μm in diameter. A short or long pedicel (stalk) may be present. At maturity, the entire fruit body may become detached from the ground, and the spores spread as the puffball is blown around like a tumbleweed.

In Bovista, the capillitium (a network of thread-like cells in which the spores are embedded) is not connected directly to the interior wall of the peridium. Instead, it is made of separate, irregularly branched units that end in tapered points. This type of capillitium, also present in the puffball genera Calbovista and Bovistella, has been called the "Bovista" type by Hanns Kreisel, who published a monograph on Bovista in 1967. Kreisel also defined the "Lycoperdon"-type (a capillitium comprising long, threads with occasional dichotomous or irregular branches), and the "intermediate" type (a transitional form between the Bovista type and Lycoperdon type, featuring threads that may be pored, with several thick main stems connected by multiple branches). All three types of capillitia structure are found in Bovista. "Bovista"-type capillitia are elastic, a feature shared with the gasteroid genera Lycoperdon and Geastrum. The flexibility of the capillitium gives the gleba a cottony texture that persists even after the exoperidium has been sloughed off.

== Systematics ==
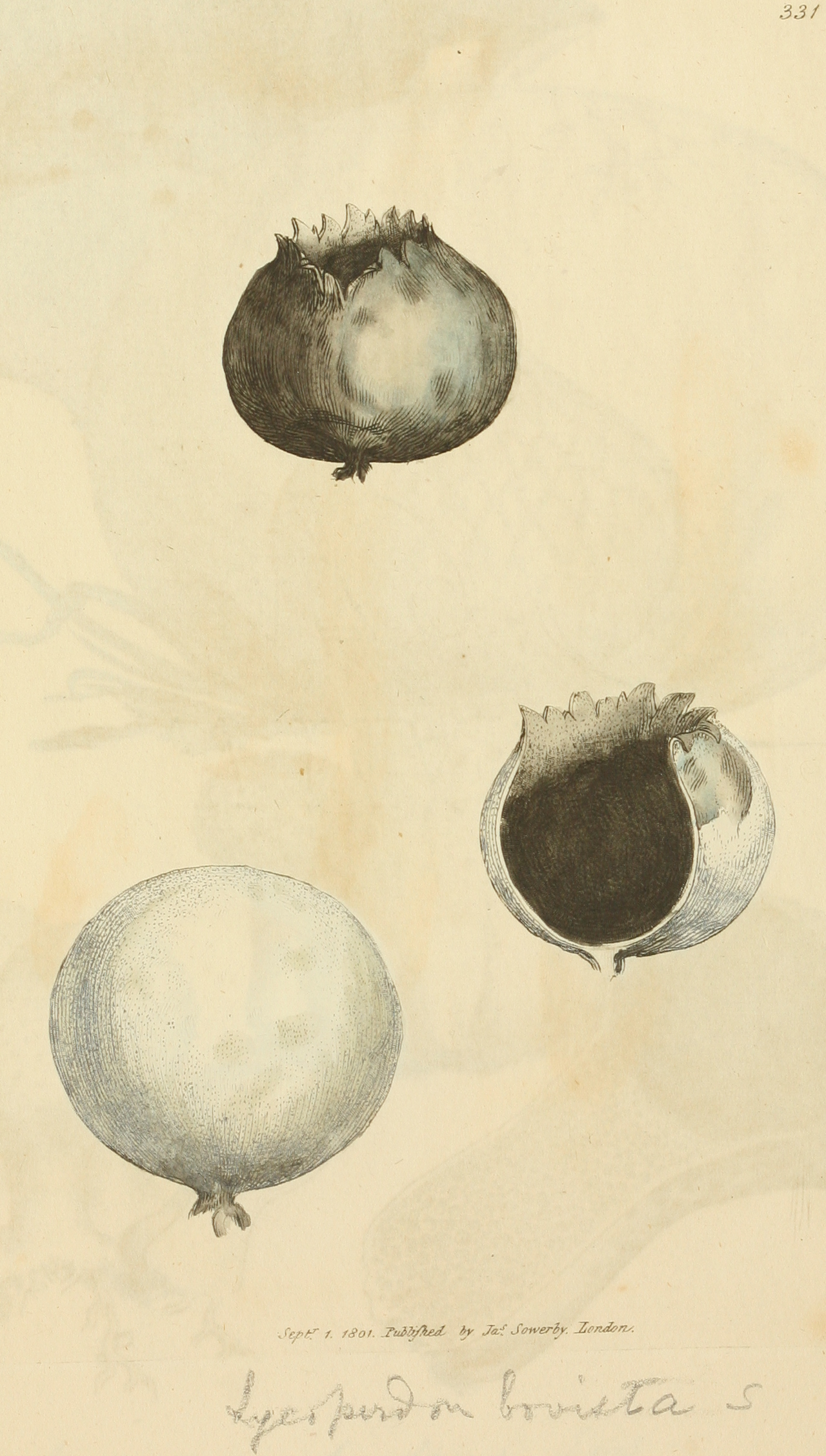
Illustration of Bovista plumbea from James Sowerby's 1797 work Coloured figures of English fungi or mushrooms

The genus was originally described by mycologist Christiaan Hendrik Persoon in 1794. He described the genus as "Cortice exteriore libero evanefcente, pileo acauli demum glaberrimo, vertice irregulariter rupto" ("Exterior cortex vanishes, cap stemless becoming smooth, irregularly breaking the top"). Synonyms include Piesmycus (Rafinesque 1808), Piemycus (Rafinesque 1813), Sackea (Rostkovius 1844), Globaria (Quélet 1873), and Pseudolycoperdon (Velenovský 1947). Bovista plumbea is the type species.

Kreisel, in his 1967 monograph, proposed two subgenera based on the type of capillitium. Subgenus Globaria has species of the Lycoperdon type, while subgenus Bovista is represented by the Bovista-type or intermediate capillitium. Further divisions into sections and series is based on the capillitium type, the absence or presence of pores in the capillitia, and the presence or absence of a subgleba (a sterile base). Phylogenetic analysis has shown that Bovista, as defined by Kreisel, is monophyletic. Also, Bovista may be split into two clades, Bovista and Globaris, that roughly correspond to the subgeneric divisions suggested by Kreisel.

== Edibility ==
Puffballs of the genus Bovista are generally edible when young and white inside, but caution must be taken to prevent confusion with immature, and potentially deadly Amanitas. This is done by cutting fruit bodies longitudinally to ensure that they are white throughout, and do not have internal structures within.

== Related genera ==
Bovistina is a related but separate genus that was created to describe species with the external features of a puffball, but with the glebal characters of a Geaster. Bovistella is another similar genus, it may be distinguished from Bovista by its ample sterile base.

== Use in homeopathy ==
Reference to the genus has appeared in several 19th-century textbooks on homeopathy. Richard Hughes wrote in A Manual of Pharmacodynamics (1870) "Bovista is said to be indicated, and to have proved curative in head affections characterised by a sensation as if the head were enormously increased in size". In Lectures on Clinical Materia Medica (1887), E. A. Farrington claims that Bovista spores restrict blood circulation through the capillaries, and suggests uses associated with menstrual irregularity, or trauma. He also mentions that Bovista produces some symptoms of suffocation, and might be useful in remedying asphyxiation resulting from inhalation of charcoal fumes. Even more ailments have been suggested to be improved with use of Bovista, such as "awkwardness in speech and action", "stuttering or stammering children", "palpitation after a meal", diabetes mellitus, ovarian cysts, and "acne due to cosmetics".

== Species ==
The Dictionary of the Fungi (10th edition, 2008) estimates there are 55 Bovista species worldwide. Index Fungorum lists 92 species that it considers to be valid.

- Bovista acocksii

reported in South Africa

- Bovista acuminata
- Bovista aenea
- Bovista aestivalis – California
- Bovista africana
- Bovista albosquamosa
- Bovista apedicellata
- Bovista amethystina
- Bovista antarctica
- Bovista arachnoides
- Bovista ardosiaca
- Bovista aspara
- Bovista betpakdalinica
- Bovista bovistoides
- Bovista brunnea
- Bovista cacao
- Bovista californica
- Bovista capensis
- Bovista cisneroi
- Bovista citrina
- Bovista colorata
- Bovista concinna
- Bovista coprophila
- Bovista cretacea
- Bovista cunninghamii
- Bovista dakotensis
- Bovista dealbata
- Bovista dermoxantha

reported causing fairy rings in Chiba City (Japan)

- Bovista dominicensis
- Bovista dryina
- Bovista dubiosa
- Bovista elegans
- Bovista flaccida
- Bovista flavobrunnea
- Bovista fuegiana

reported from Tierra del Fuego, Argentina

- Bovista gunnii
- Bovista fulva
- Bovista fusca
- Bovista glacialis
- Bovista glaucocinerea
- Bovista grandipora
- Bovista graveolens
- Bovista grisea
- Bovista gunnii
- Bovista halophila
- Bovista herrerae
- Bovista heterocapilla
- Bovista himalaica
- Bovista hungarica
- Bovista incarnata
- Bovista jonesii
- Bovista kazachstanica
- Bovista kurczumensis
- Bovista kurgaldzhinica
- Bovista lauterbachii
- Bovista leonoviana
- Bovista leucoderma
- Bovista limosa

Originally collected in Iceland

- Bovista longicauda
- Bovista longispora
- Bovista longissima
- Bovista lycoperdoides
- Bovista macrospora
- Bovista magellanica
- Bovista minor
- Bovista membranacea
- Bovista monticola
- Bovista nigra
- Bovista nigrescens – Brown puffball, black bovist
- Bovista oblongispora
- Bovista ochrotricha
- Bovista paludosa – Fen puffball
- Bovista perpusilla
- Bovista pila – Tumbling puffball
- Bovista plumbea – Paltry Puffball, grey puffball
- Bovista polymorpha
- Bovista promontorii
- Bovista pulyuggeodes
- Bovista pusilla – Dwarf puffball
- Bovista pusilloformis

found in Finland

- Bovista radicata
- Bovista reunionis
- Bovista ruizii
- Bovista schwarzmanniana
- Bovista sclerocystis

reported from Mexico

- Bovista sempervirentium
- Bovista septima
- Bovista singeri

reported from Nor Yungas, Bolivia

- Bovista spinulosa
- Bovista sublaevispora

reported form Viña del Mar, Chile

- Bovista substerilis
- Bovista sulphurea
- Bovista termitum
- Bovista tomentosa
- Bovista trachyspora
- Bovista umbrina
- Bovista uruguayensis
- Bovista vascelloides

reported from Nepal

- Bovista vassjaginiana
- Bovista verrucosa
- Bovista yasudae
- Bovista zeyheri
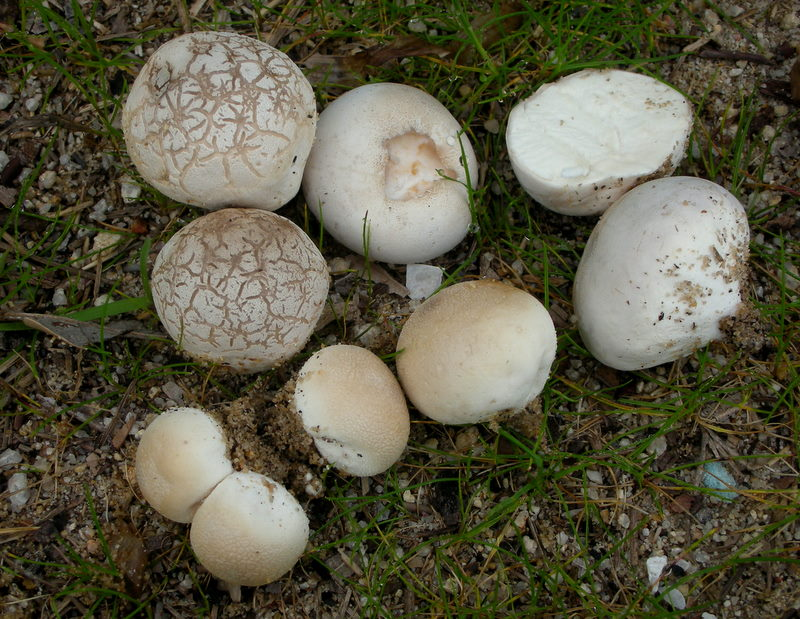
Bovista aestivalis

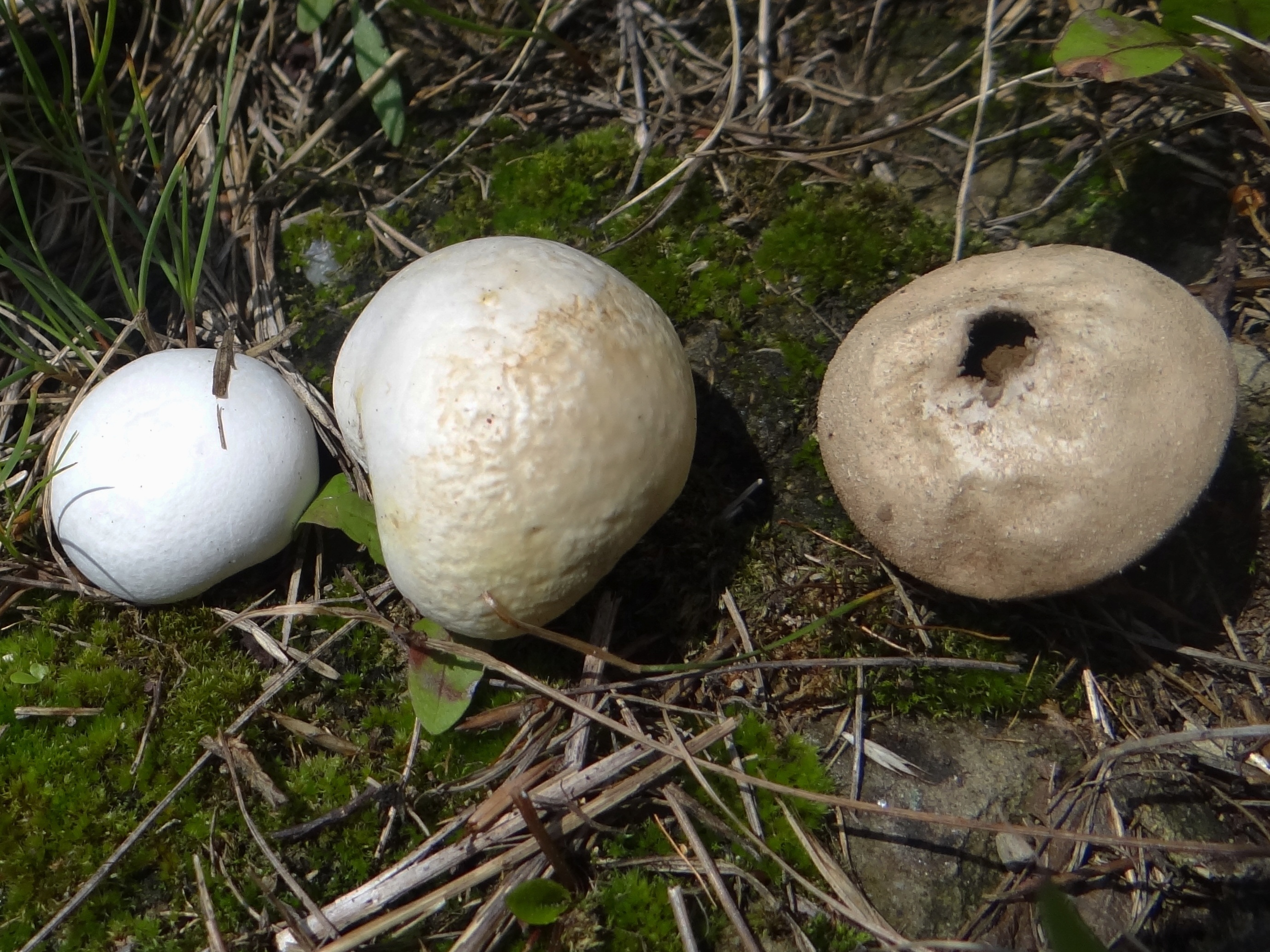
Bovista nigrescens

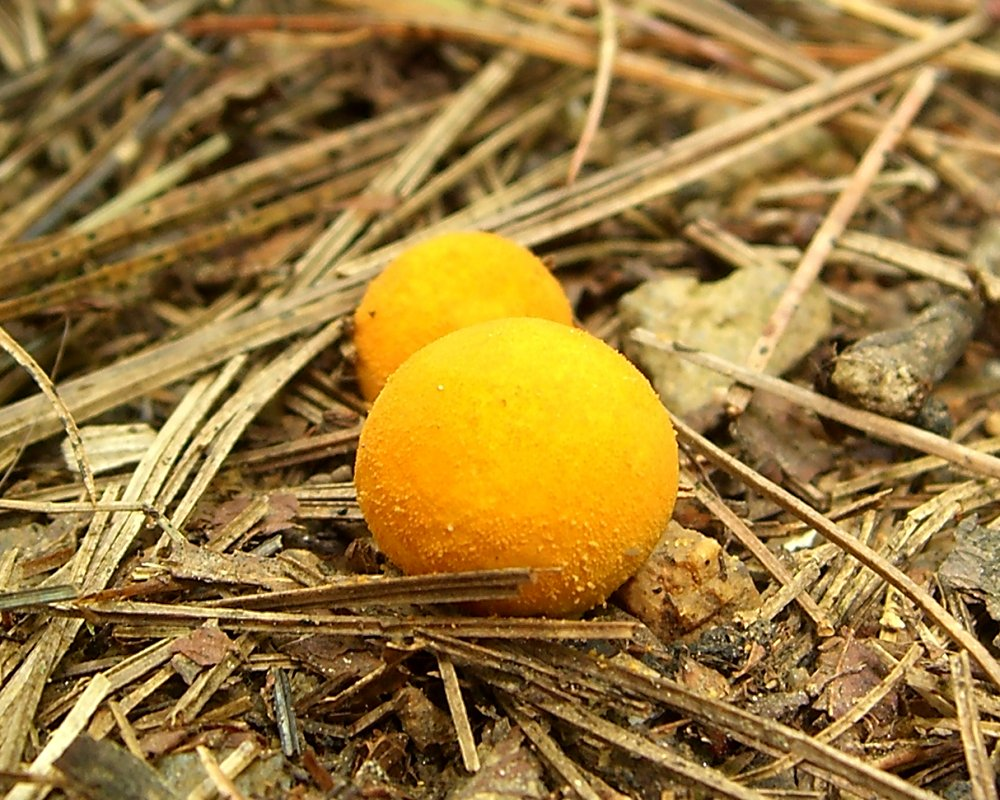
Bovista colorata

== See also ==
- List of Agaricaceae genera
- List of Agaricales genera
