= Calvatia pachydermica =

Scientific classification
- Domain: Eukaryota
- Kingdom: Fungi
- Division: Basidiomycota
- Class: Agaricomycetes
- Order: Agaricales
- Family: Agaricaceae
- Genus: Calvatia
- Species: C. pachydermica

Binomial name
- Calvatia pachydermica (Speg.) Kreisel, 1992

Synonyms
- Bovista pachydermica

Species of fungus

Calvatia pachydermica is a species of puffball mushroom native to southernmost South America. Originally described in 1887 as Bovista pachydermica from a specimen collected in 1882 at Tierra Del Fuego in Argentina near Punta Arenas in Chile, this puffball was moved to the genus Calvatia in 1992. Most collections of this species have been made from southernmost Chile.

German mycologist Hanns Kreisel placed it in Calvatia sect. Cretacea, which is a grouping characterized by "Exoperidium spiny or areolate. Capillitium with small or large pits. Subgleba cellular or rudimentary. Mature gleba brown or violaceous brown."
