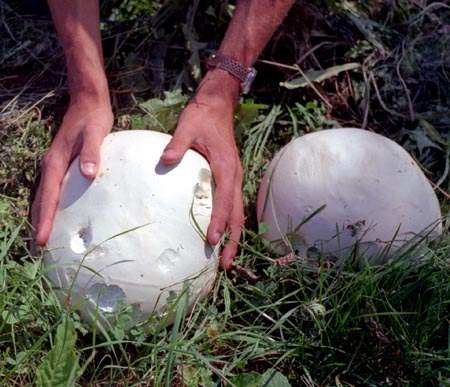
- Calvatia gigantea

Scientific classification
- Kingdom: Fungi
- Division: Basidiomycota
- Class: Agaricomycetes
- Order: Lycoperdales

Families
- Broomeiaceae; Geastraceae; Lycoperdaceae; Mesophelliaceae; Mycenastraceae

= Lycoperdales =

Order of fungi

The Lycoperdales are a now outdated order of fungi. The order included some well-known types such as the giant puffball, the earthstars, and other tuberous fungi. They were defined as having epigeous basidiomes, a hymenium present, one to three layers in the peridium (outer wall), powdery gleba, and brown spores.

The restructuring of fungal taxonomy brought about by molecular phylogeny has divided this order. Most of its members have been placed in family Agaricaceae of order Agaricales, while the earthstars are now in Geastrales, and similar species now occupy the order Phallales.

Lycoperdales were distinguished by their globose or subglobose fruiting body having a gleba that is powdery at maturity, and generally supported by sterile tissue. Example genera include Lycoperdon, Bovista, and Calvatia.
