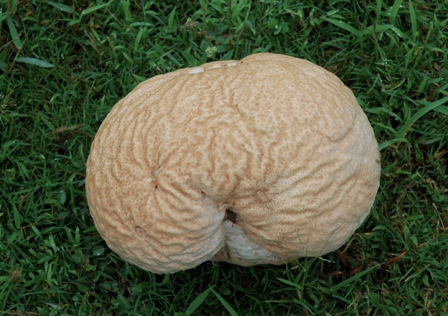
- Calvatia craniiformis

Scientific classification
- Domain: Eukaryota
- Kingdom: Fungi
- Division: Basidiomycota
- Class: Agaricomycetes
- Order: Agaricales
- Family: Agaricaceae
- Genus: Calvatia; Fr. (1849)

Type species
- Calvatia craniiformis (Schwein.) Fr. (1849)

Synonyms
- Omalycus Raf. (1814); Hippoperdon Mont. (1842); Hypoblema Lloyd (1902)

= Calvatia =

Genus of fungi

Calvatia is a genus of puffball mushrooms that includes the giant puffball C. gigantea. It was formerly classified within the now-obsolete order Lycoperdales, which, following a restructuring of fungal taxonomy brought about by molecular phylogeny, has been split; the puffballs, Calvatia spp. are now placed in the family Lycoperdaceae of the order Agaricales.

Most species in the genus Calvatia are edible when young, though some are best avoided, such as Calvatia fumosa, which has a very pungent odor.

The name Calvatia derives from the Latin calvus meaning "bald" and calvaria, meaning "dome of the skull".

== Taxonomy ==
Calvatia was circumscribed by Swedish mycologist Elias Magnus Fries in 1849. Fries included a single species in the genus, Calvatia craniiformis, which was originally described as Bovista craniiformis by Lewis David de Schweinitz in 1832.

== Species ==
As of February 2015, Index Fungorum lists 58 species of Calvatia.

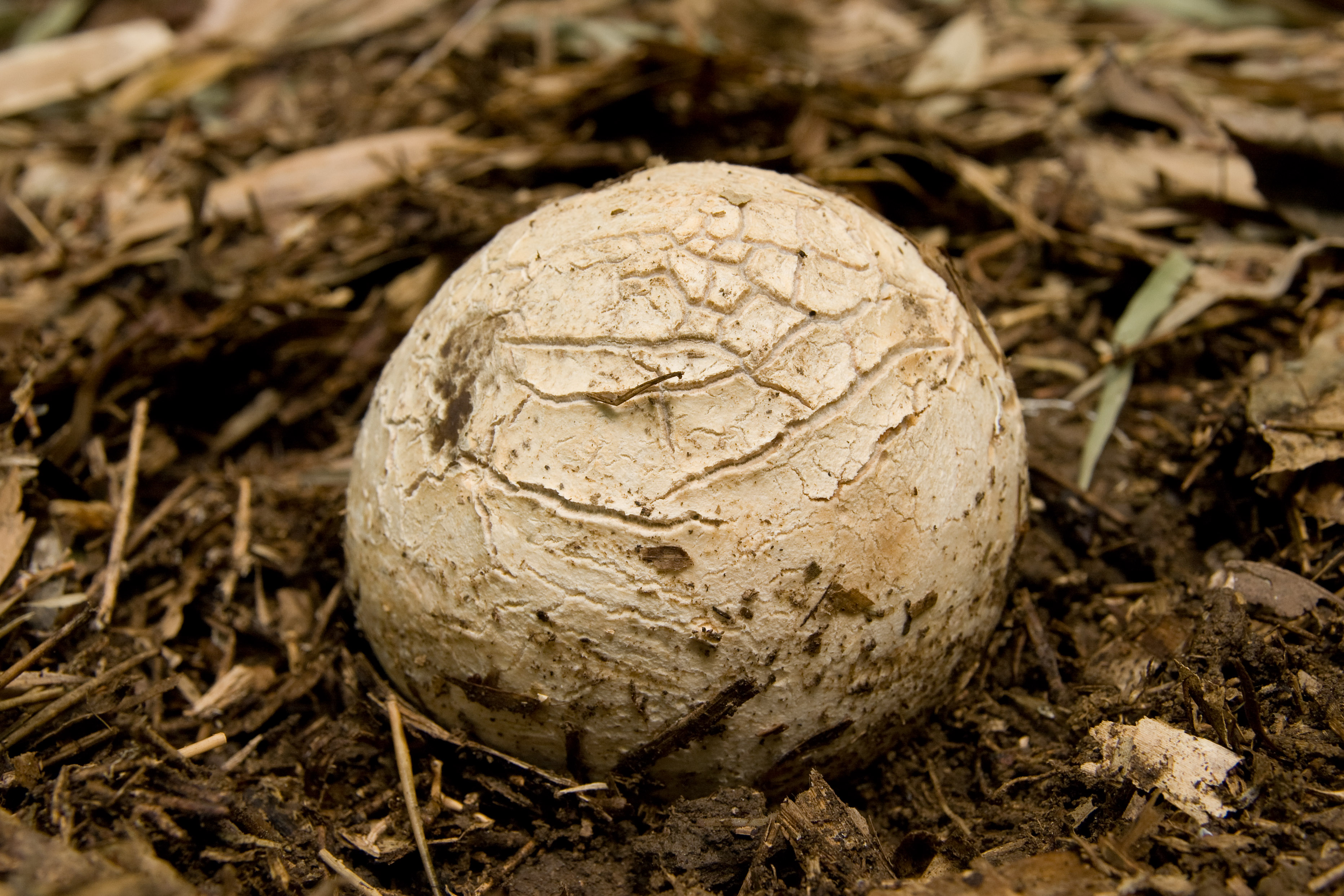
Calvatia nipponica

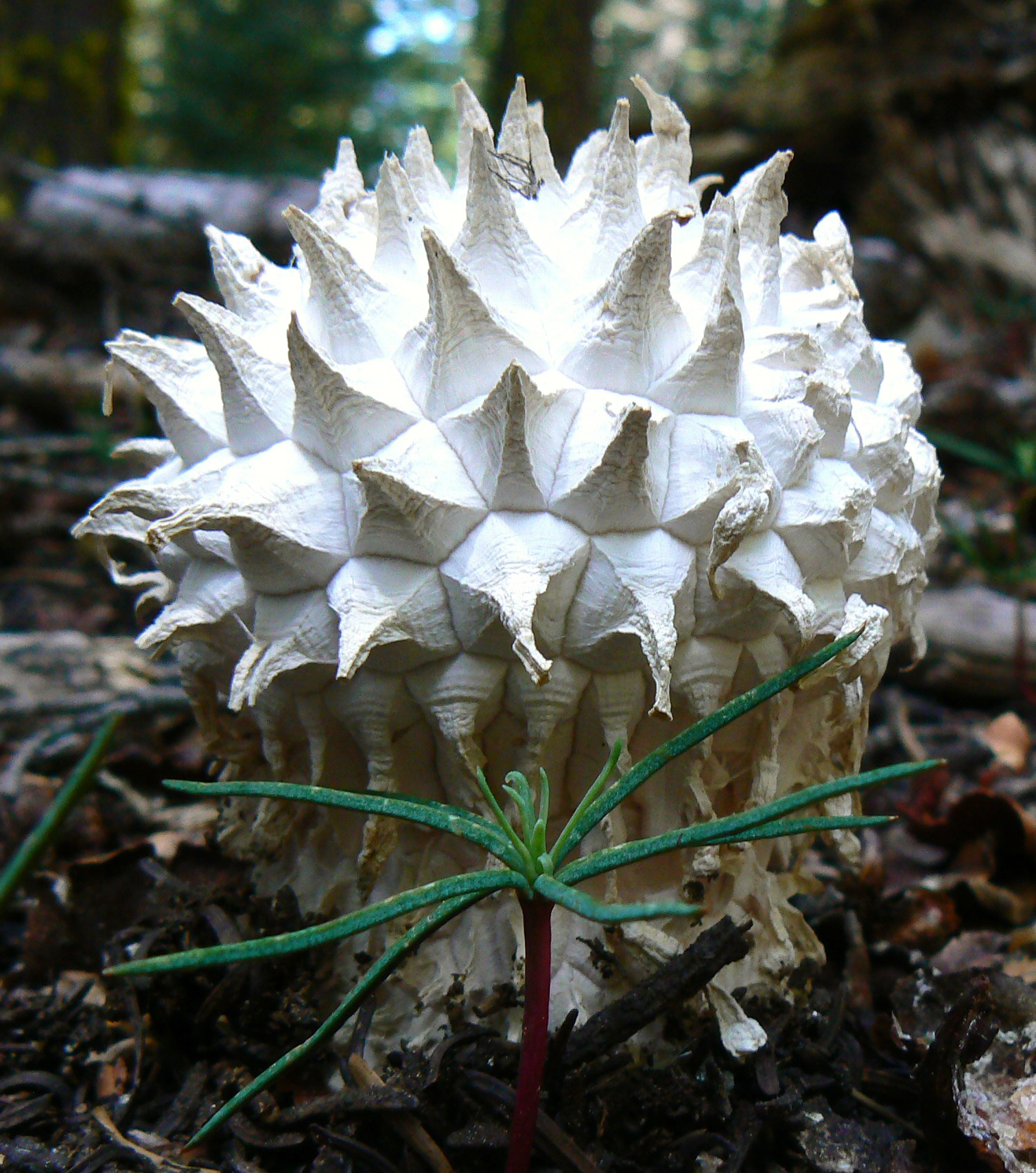
Calvatia sculpta

- C. agaricoides Dissing & M. Lange 1962
- C. ahmadii Khalid & S.H. Iqbal 2004 – Pakistan
- C. aniodina Pat. 1912 – Africa
- C. arctica Ferd. & Winge 1910 – Greenland
- C. argentea (Berk.) Kreisel 1992
- C. bellii (Peck) M. Lange 1990
- C. bicolor (Lév.) Kreisel 1992
- C. boninensis S.Ito & S.Imai 1939 – Bonin Islands, Japan
- C. booniana A.H.Sm. 1964
- C. borealis T.C.E.Fr. 1914 – Europe
- C. candida (Rostk.) Hollós 1902
- C. capensis (Lloyd) J.C.Coetzee, Eicker & A.E.van Wyk 2003
- C. connivens M.Lange 1990 – Greenland
- C. cretacea (Berk.) Lloyd 1917
- C. craniiformis (Schwein.) Fr. ex De Toni 1888
- C. crucibulum (Mont.) Kreisel 1992
- C. cyathiformis (Bosc) Morgan 1890
- C. flava (Massee) Kreisel 1992
- C. friabilis (G.Moreno, Altés, C.Ochoa & J.E.Wright) G.Moreno, Altés & C.Ochoa 2006
- C. fulvida Sosin 1952
- C. fusca (G.Cunn.) Grgur. 1997
- C. gardneri (Berk.) Lloyd 1904
- C. gigantea (Batsch) Lloyd 1904
- C. guzmanii C.R.Alves & Cortez 2012
- C. holothurioides Rebriev 2013
- C. horrida M.Lange 1990 – Svalbard, Norway
- C. incerta Bottomley 1948
- C. kakavu (Zipp.) Overeem 1927
- C. lacerata A.H.Sm. 1964
- C. lachnoderma Pat. 1907
- C. lilacina (Mont. & Berk.) Henn. 1904
- C. lloydii Zeller & Coker 1947
- C. lycoperdoides Kościelny & Wojt. 1935
- C. macrogemmae Lloyd 1923
- C. nipponica Kawam. ex Kasuya & Katum. 2008
- C. nodulata Alfredo & Baseia 2014 – Brazil
- C. oblongispora V.L.Suárez, J.E.Wright & Calonge 2009 – Brazil
- C. occidentalis Lloyd 1915
- C. ochrogleba Zeller 1947
- C. olba Grgur. 1997 – New South Wales, Australia
- C. olivacea (Cooke & Massee) Lloyd 1905
- C. owyheensis A.H.Sm. 1964
- C. pachydermica (Speg.) Kreisel 1992
- C. pallida A.H.Sm. 1964
- C. paradoxa A.H.Sm. 1964
- C. polygonia A.H.Sm. 1964
- C. primitiva Lloyd 1904
- C. pseudolilacina (Speg.) Speg. 1919
- C. pygmaea (R.E.Fr.) Kreisel, G.Moreno, C.Ochoa & Altés 1998
- C. pyriformis (Lév.) Kreisel 1992
- C. rosacea Kreisel 1989 – Ecuador
- C. rubrotincta Zeller 1947
- C. rugosa (Berk. & M.A. Curtis) D.A. Reid 1977
- C. sculpta (Harkn.) Lloyd 1904
- C. septentrionalis M.Lange 1990 – Greenland
- C. sporocristata Calonge 2003 – Costa Rica
- C. subtomentosa Dissing & M.Lange 1962
- C. tropicalis (Speg.) Speg. 1919
- C. turneri (Ellis & Everh.) Demoulin & M.Lange 1990
- C. utriformis (Bull.) Jaap 1918
- C. vinosa Kasuya & Retn. 2006 – Indonesia
- C. violascens (Cooke & Massee) R.T.Baker 1907

== See also ==
- List of Agaricales genera
- List of Agaricaceae genera
