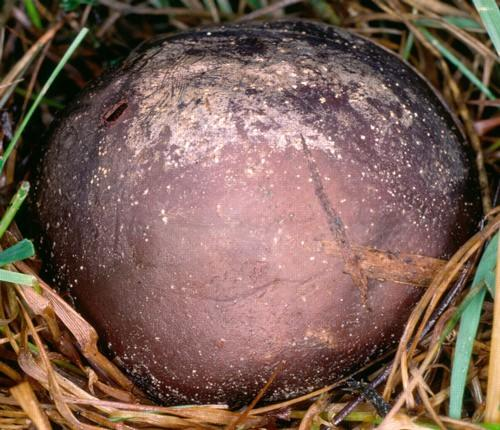

Scientific classification
- Domain: Eukaryota
- Kingdom: Fungi
- Division: Basidiomycota
- Class: Agaricomycetes
- Order: Agaricales
- Family: Lycoperdaceae
- Genus: Bovista
- Species: B. nigrescens

Binomial name
- Bovista nigrescens (Pers.) (1794)

= Bovista nigrescens =

Bovista nigrescens Mycological characteristics
- Glebal hymenium
- No distinct cap
- Hymenium attachment is irregular or not applicable
- Lacks a stipe
- Spore print is brown
- Ecology is saprotrophic
- Edibility is edible

Bovista nigrescens, commonly referred to as the brown puffball or black bovist, is an edible cream white or brown puffball. Phylogenetic relationships between Bovista nigrescens and species of Lycoperdaceae were established based on ITS and LSU sequence data from north European taxa.

== Description ==
The fruit body of Bovista nigrescens is 3–6 centimetres (1 1/4–2 1/4 in) across. The roughly spherical fruit body is slightly pointed at the bottom. Although it lacks a sterile base, the fruit body is attached to the substrate by a single mycelial cord which often breaks, leaving the fruit body free to roll about in the wind. The outer wall is white at first, but soon flakes off in large scales at maturity to expose the dark purple-brown to blackish inner wall that encloses the spore mass. These spores leave via an apical pore, which is caused by extensive splitting and cracking. The gleba is often dark purple-brown. The capillitium is highly branched with brown dendroid elements. Spores are brown and ovoid, with a diameter of 4.5–6 μm. They are thick-walled, and nearly smooth, with a central oil droplet, and a long, warted pedicel.

== Habitat and distribution ==
Bovista nigrescens puffballs are often found in grass and pastureland. Although they are found most abundantly in late summer to autumn, they persist in old dried condition for many months. They are uncommon in most areas, but frequent in North and West Europe. They are edible when young. In addition, they are found on the ground, fields, lawns or on roadsides. Typically, they may be found at an altitude of up to 2,500 metres (8,200 ft).

== Uses ==
The young specimens can be halved and cooked.
