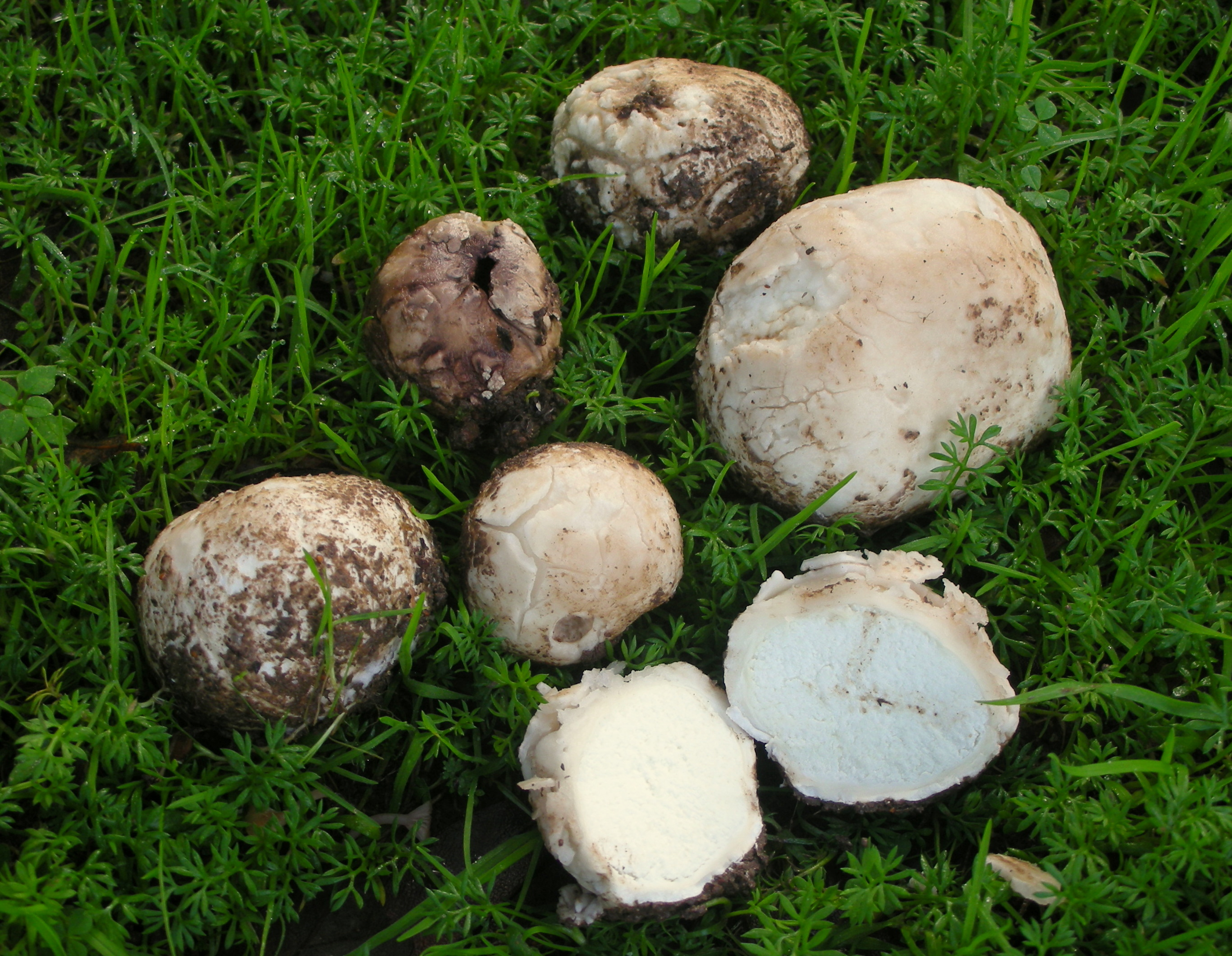

Scientific classification
- Domain: Eukaryota
- Kingdom: Fungi
- Division: Basidiomycota
- Class: Agaricomycetes
- Order: Agaricales
- Family: Lycoperdaceae
- Genus: Bovista
- Species: B. plumbea

Binomial name
- Bovista plumbea Pers. (1795)

= Bovista plumbea =

Species of fungus

Bovista plumbea Mycological characteristics
- Glebal hymenium
- No distinct cap
- Hymenium attachment is not applicable
- Lacks a stipe
- Spore print is brown
- Ecology is saprotrophic
- Edibility is edible or inedible

Bovista plumbea, commonly known as the tumbling puffball, tumbleball, or paltry puffball, is a small puffball mushroom. It is white when young and greyish in age. Easily confused with immature Bovista dermoxantha, it is attached to the substrate by a tuft of mycelium. It is commonly found in Western Europe and California.

== Synonyms ==
Obsolete synonyms for B. plumbea include:

- Bovista ovalispora Cooke & Massee 1887
- Bovista plumbea Pers. 1796
- Bovista plumbea var. ovalispora (Cooke & Massee) F. Šmarda 1958
- Calvatia bovista (L.) Pers. 1896
- Lycoperdon bovista Sowerby 1803
- Lycoperdon plumbeum Vittad. 1842

== Description ==
The fruiting body of the sporocarp is 1.5–3.5 centimetres (1/2–1 1/2 in) broad, attached to the substrate by a tuft of mycelium, and spherical to slightly compressed. The exoperidium is white, becoming buff to pale-tan and minutely tomentose, and sometimes areolate. It eventually flakes away, or peels off in sheets, the latter occurring at maturation in hot, dry conditions. In contrast, the endoperidium membranes are lead-grey, with or without adhering fragments of exoperidium.

=== Spores ===
The spores are 5.0–6.5 x 4.0–5.5 μm, ovoid, thick-walled, and nearly smooth, with a central oil droplet, and a 7.5–11.5 μm pedicel. The capillitium is composed of individual elements, rather than interwoven, main branches thick-walled, flexuous, rapidly tapering, forking more or less dichotomously, ochre-colored in KOH.

The spores are released via a small apical pore. The gleba is white, turning dingy yellowish, olive-brown, finally dark-brown and firm-textured. However, the subgleba and sterile base are usually absent. Fruiting occurs throughout the mushroom season.

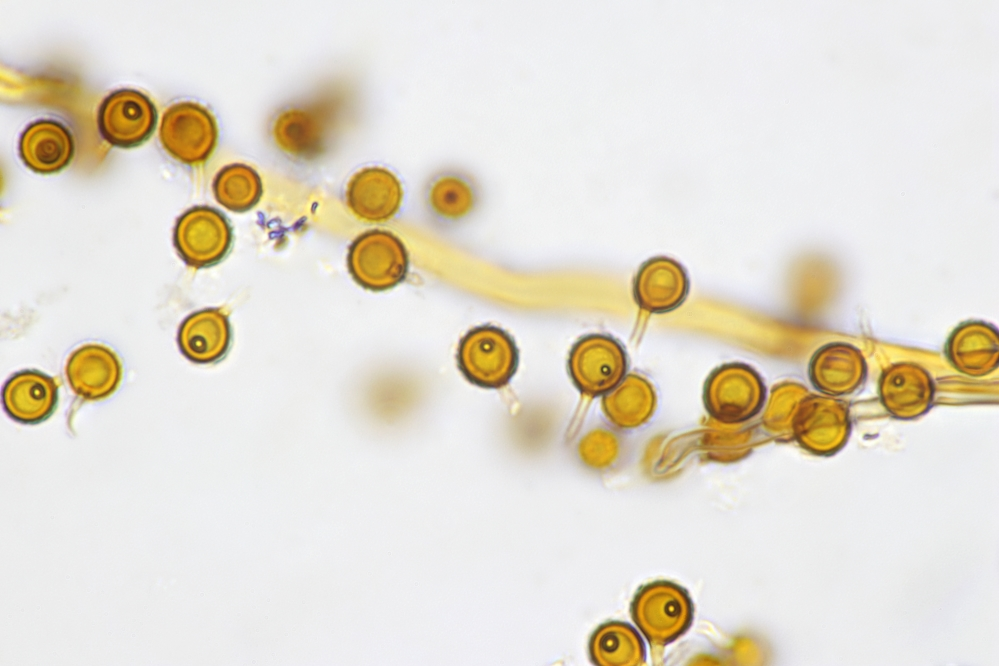
Spores

== Distribution and habitat ==
It is commonly found in Western Europe and California.

It often lives in scattered to clustered in disturbed areas, especially in sparse grass.

== Uses ==
The young globes can be halved and cooked, but are bland and too insubstantial to be of much interest.
