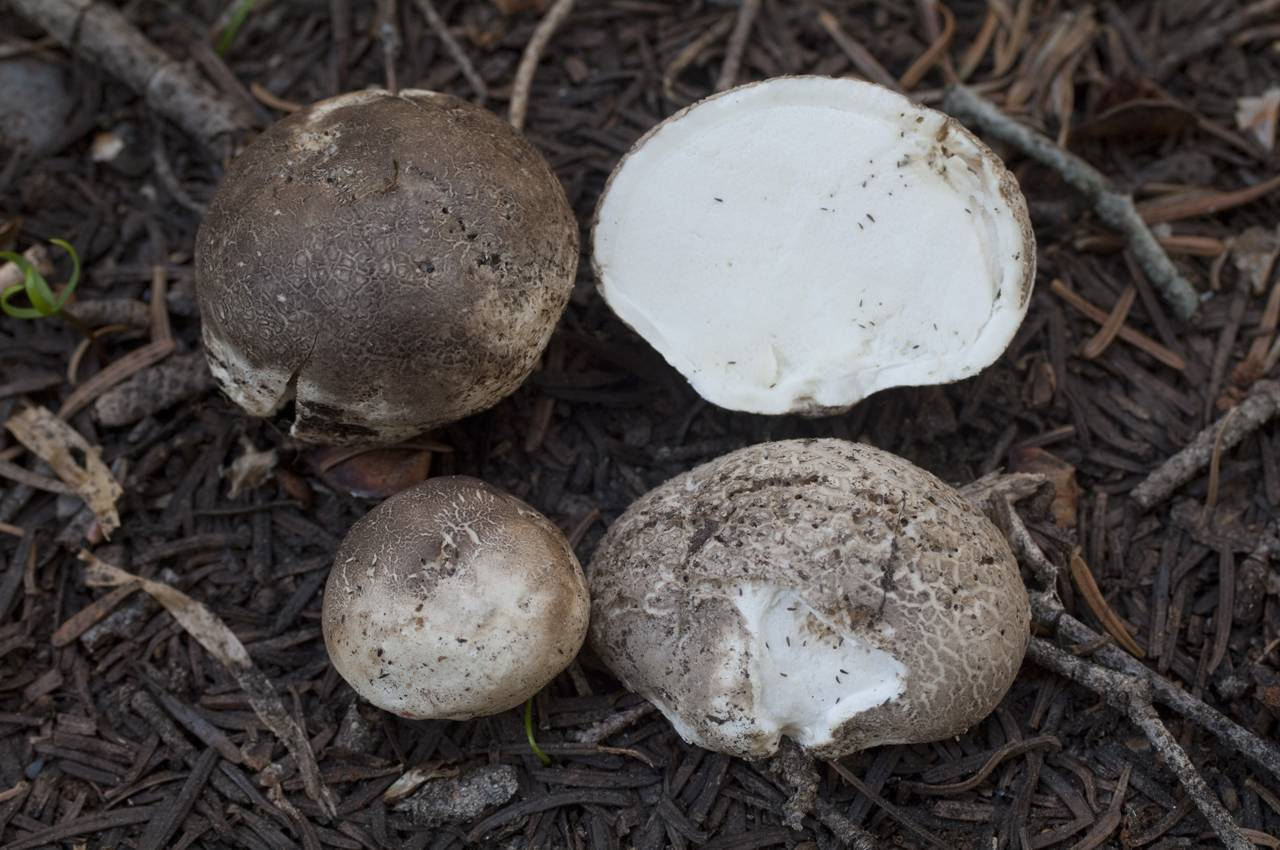

Scientific classification
- Domain: Eukaryota
- Kingdom: Fungi
- Division: Basidiomycota
- Class: Agaricomycetes
- Order: Agaricales
- Family: Agaricaceae
- Genus: Gastropila
- Species: G. fumosa

Binomial name
- Gastropila fumosa (Zeller) P.Ponce de León (1976)

Synonyms
- Calvatia fumosa Zeller (1947); Handkea fumosa (Zeller) Kreisel (1989)

= Gastropila fumosa =

Species of fungus

Gastropila fumosa Mycological characteristics
- Glebal hymenium
- No distinct cap
- Hymenium attachment is not applicable
- Lacks a stipe
- Spore print is brown
- Ecology is mycorrhizal
- Edibility is unknown

Gastropila fumosa is a species of puffball in the family Agaricaceae. It was first described as Calvatia fumosa by American mycologist Sanford Myron Zeller in 1947, and later transferred to Gastropila in 1976. Some authors place it instead in the genus Handkea, circumscribed by Hanns Kreisel in 1989.

== Description ==
The fruit body is anywhere from golf ball size to baseball size, round to oval, 3–8 cm (1 1/8–3 1/8 in) broad, thick, at first smooth and white, soon becoming grayish to brownish. The spores are firm and white at first, then yellowish or olive, and then dark brown and powdery. The species has an unpleasant smell while developing. Its edibility is unknown.

== Distribution and habitat ==
The species fruits singly, in groups, or in small clusters on soil in spruce-fir forests in the Rocky Mountains and westward in the summer and fall.
