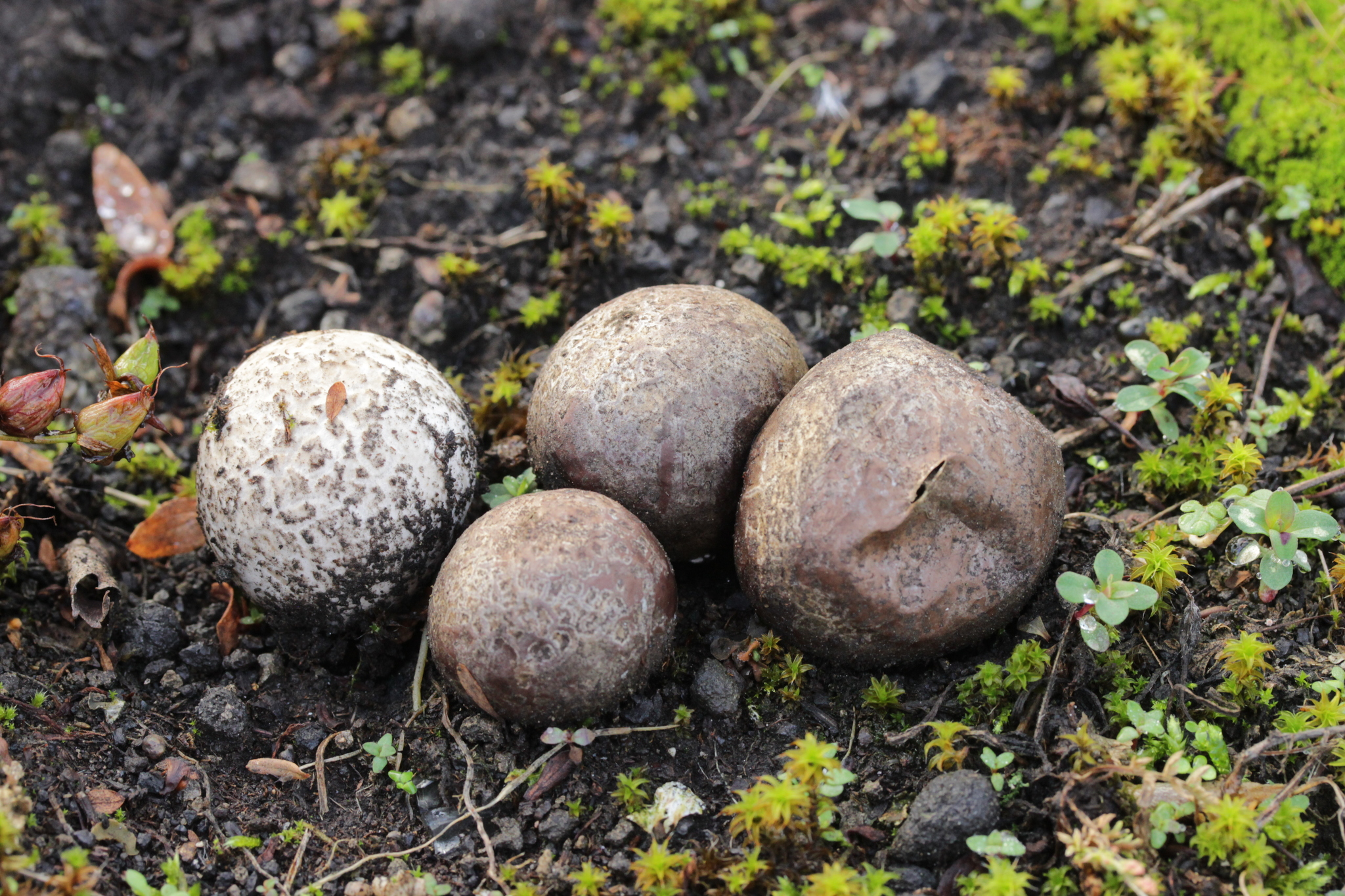

Scientific classification
- Domain: Eukaryota
- Kingdom: Fungi
- Division: Basidiomycota
- Class: Agaricomycetes
- Order: Agaricales
- Family: Lycoperdaceae
- Genus: Bovista
- Species: B. tomentosa

Binomial name
- Bovista tomentosa (Vittad.) Quél.

= Bovista tomentosa =

Species of fungus

Bovista tomentosa is a species of puffball fungus in the family Lycoperdaceae, first described by Carlo Vittadini and given its current name by Giovanni Battista de Toni.

== Distribution and habitat ==
It appears in North America, Europe, Africa and Asia, most often in Europe. It usually grows outside forests, in sunny places, among xerothermic vegetation, on calcareous soils among grasses, on pastures, sometimes on rocks, less often in pine forests, parks and gardens, also in Juniperus communis thickets, on abandoned farmlands and industrial waste.
