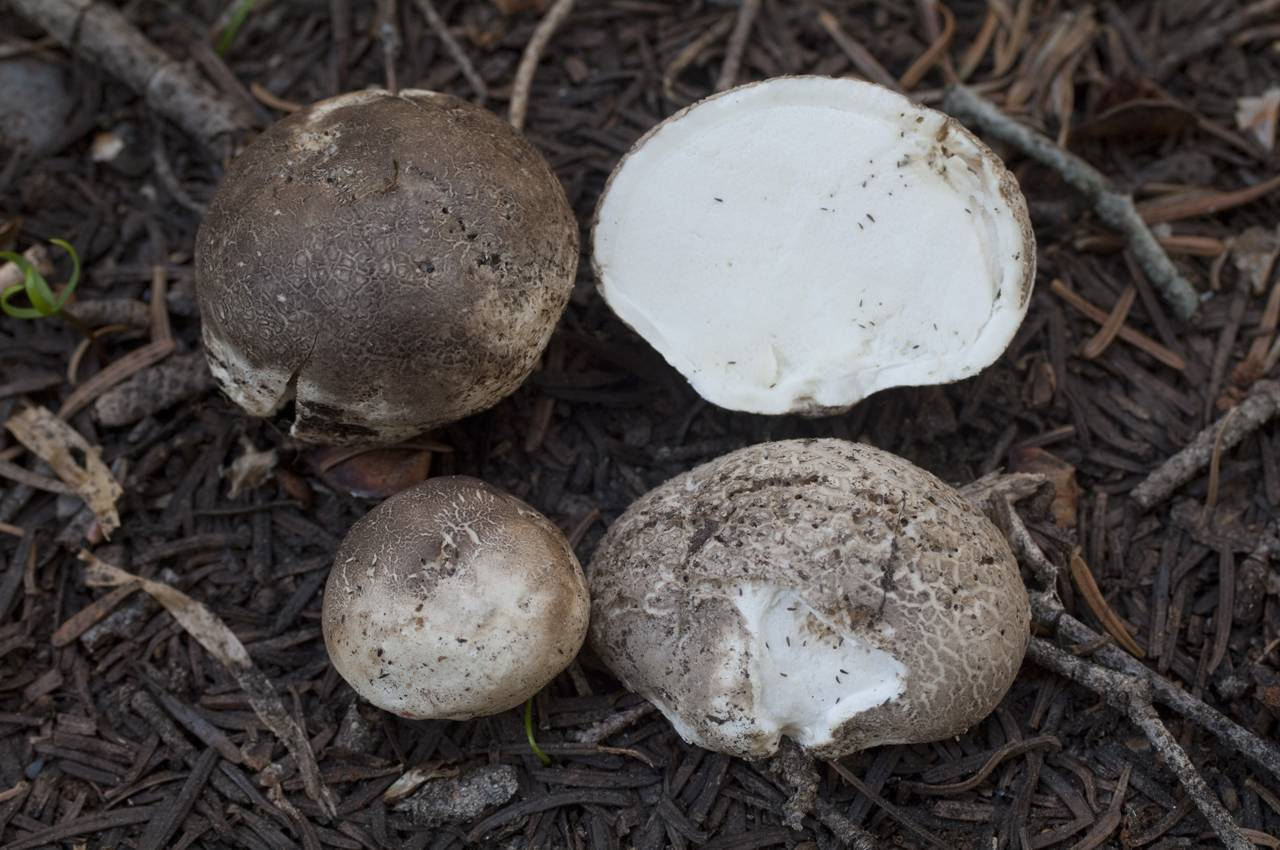
- Gastropila fumosa

Scientific classification
- Domain: Eukaryota
- Kingdom: Fungi
- Division: Basidiomycota
- Class: Agaricomycetes
- Order: Agaricales
- Family: Agaricaceae
- Genus: Gastropila; Homrich & J.E.Wright (1973)

Type species
- Gastropila fragilis (Lév.) Homrich & J.E.Wright (1973)

Species
- G. fragilis G. fumosa G. hesperia G. subcretacea

= Gastropila =

Genus of fungi

Gastropila is a genus of fungi in the family Agaricaceae. The genus, described in 1973, contains four puffball-like species distributed in the Americas.

== See also ==
- List of Agaricaceae genera
- List of Agaricales genera
