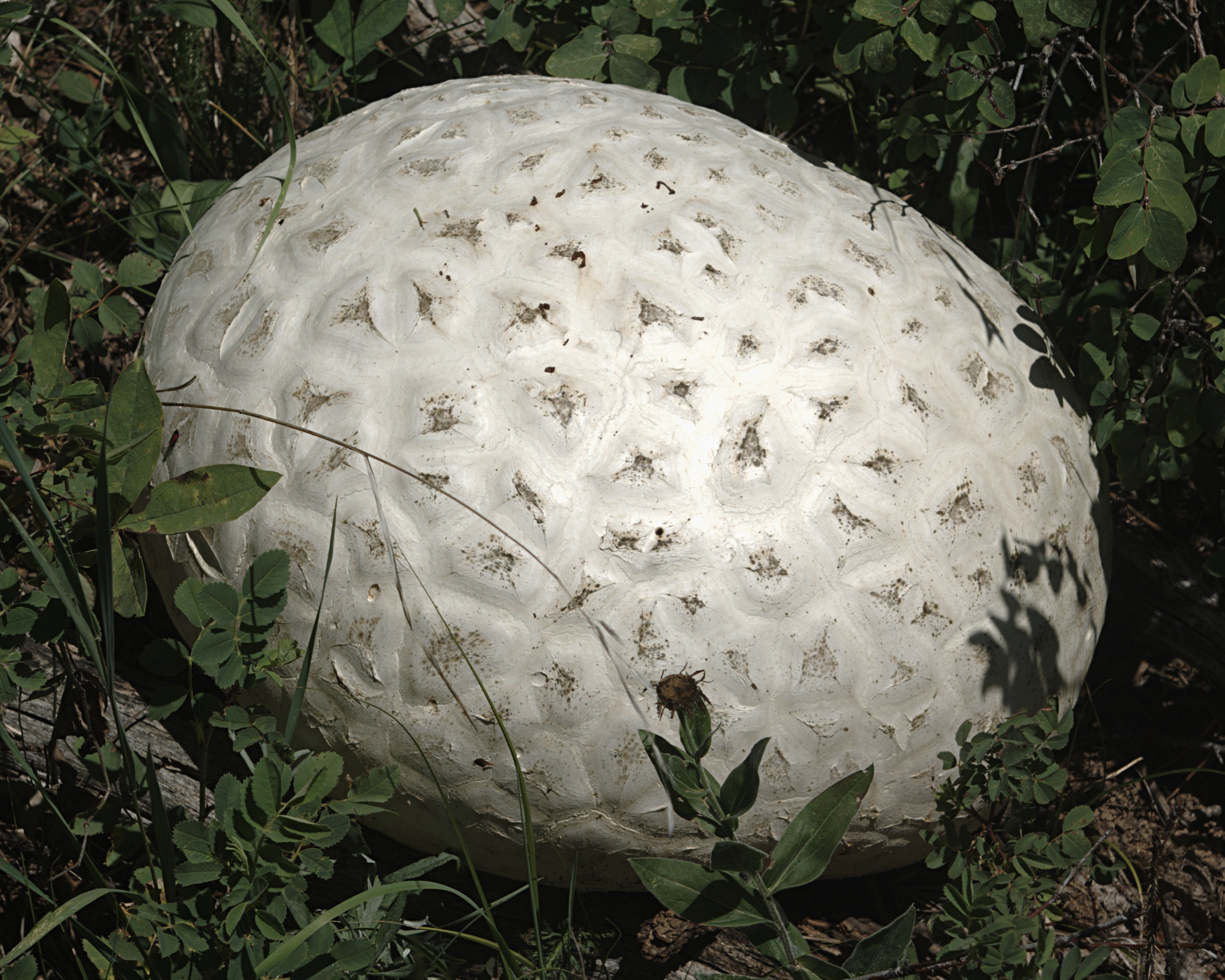
- On a forested hillside in New Mexico

Scientific classification
- Kingdom: Fungi
- Division: Basidiomycota
- Class: Agaricomycetes
- Order: Agaricales
- Family: Agaricaceae
- Genus: Calvatia
- Species: C. booniana

Binomial name
- Calvatia booniana A.H.Sm. (1964)

= Calvatia booniana =

Species of fungus

Calvatia booniana
- Mycological characteristics
- Glebal hymenium
- No distinct cap
- Hymenium attachment is irregular or not applicable
- Lacks a stipe
- Spore print is white to brown
- Ecology is saprotrophic
- Edibility is choice or inedible

Calvatia booniana, commonly known as the western giant puffball, is a species of puffball mushroom.

== Description ==
The fruit body can grow 10 to 70 centimetres (4 to 27 1/2 in) in diameter, as large as its close relative, the giant puffball of eastern North America and Europe. Its shape is round or a flattened sphere with no stalk and is at least 12 cm (4.7 in) across when mature. The exterior is white or tan. Unlike giant puffballs, which are smooth, the western giant puffball is covered with plaques or large pointed warts. The interior is first firm and white, then yellow and slimy, and finally powdery.

Unlike most puffballs, the western giant puffball reproduces in three stages asexually. Smaller western giant puffballs usually clump of the epididymal covering of the parent.

== Habitat and distribution ==
Like the giant puffball, it grows on composted soil such as in meadows, fields, and forests, as well as on roadsides, sagebrush flats, pastures, and other sunny places. In general, western giant puffballs occur on the west side of the Rocky Mountains and giant puffballs occur on the east side. On the West Coast of North America, the western giant puffball is replaced by the giant puffball or a closely related species.

== Uses ==
The western giant puffball is edible when completely white inside, but may cause a laxative effect for some people. Those that have even traces of yellow or green are inedible. It does not wash well, so trimming most of the dirt off is best. Washing with water makes it too soggy to saute. It is seasoned the same way as the giant puffball. It is good cubed and cooked in soup, breaded and deep-fried, steamed, sauteed, or simmered like other mushrooms. The western giant puffball, like the giant puffball, does not dehydrate well but can be cooked (to prevent it from becoming mush) and then frozen. After it thaws it should be cooked again. With the texture of tofu or marshmallows it is similar to the giant puffball. Like many other foodstuffs (and many puffballs), not all specimens taste the same.

== See also ==
- Calvatia pachyderma
