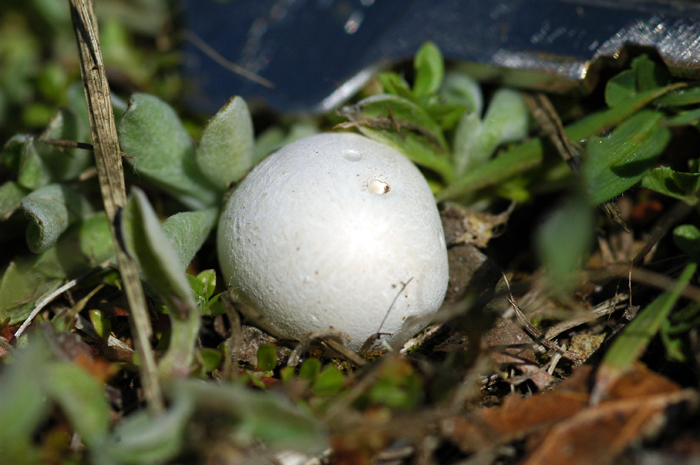

Scientific classification
- Kingdom: Fungi
- Division: Basidiomycota
- Class: Agaricomycetes
- Order: Agaricales
- Family: Lycoperdaceae
- Genus: Bovista; Pers. (1794)

Type species
- Bovista dermoxantha Pers. (1795)

= Bovista dermoxantha =

Bovista

Species of fungus

Bovista dermoxantha is a small, white, nearly round puffball, recognized when young by a cottony-felty outer surface that becomes inconspicuously warted, eventually leaving fine, pallid, scales on an ochre to brown endoperidium. Bovista plumbea is similar, but has a smoother surface when young, and lacks a basal mycelial cord. In age it is distinguished by a dull greyish endoperidium. Large specimens of Bovista dermoxantha may also be mistaken for Bovista pila. Both have a mycelial cord attachment to the substrate, but Bovista pila differs in releasing spores through tears or splits in the endoperidium rather than by an apical pore.

== Description ==
The fruiting body of the sporocarp is 1.5-3.0 (4.0) cm broad, subglobose, and attached to the substrate by a white mycelial cord. The exoperidium, which is white, felty, and shrivels in age, leaving buff to light-brown, grows up to 1.0 mm thick. There are furfuraceous scales or low warts on the endoperidium, which consists of a thin, membranous, ochre-brown to medium-brown layer, opening via a ragged apical pore. The gleba is soft, white, and becomes yellowish-olive to olive-brown, and finally to medium-brown at maturity. The subgleba and sterile base are absent. It has an undistinctive odor and taste. Although they are edible, they are too small to be considered for an ordinary meal.

== Habitat ==
The Bovista dermoxantha is solitary, scattered, and clustered on disturbed ground. For example, they can be found on pastures, playing fields, edges of woods, roads, and paths. At low elevations, they are widely distributed, and fruit during the summer in watered areas and throughout the mushroom season. Though they are common, they are inconspicuous and easily overlooked.

== Spores ==
Spores are 3.5-4.5 μm in diameter, globose, thick-walled, and smooth to faintly warted. In addition, they have a central oil droplet and stub-like pedicel, and a sparsely branched thin capillitium. The pits are variable, consisting of absent to abundant.

As with most Bovista, the spore release through the small apical pore.

== Synonyms ==
- Lycoperdon dermoxantha Vittidini
- Bovista pusilla (Batsch: Persoon) Persoon nomen ambiguum
- Lycoperdon pusillum Batsch sensu auct.

== Observations ==
The relationship between temperature and fruit body emergence in summer in pathogens of basidiomycetes, Bovista dermoxantha, Lycoperdon curtisii and Conocybe lactea, on turf was examined using the method developed to predict the timing of emergence in pest insects. The number of fruit bodies at the turf study site in Chiba, Japan, was recorded together with average temperature at the weather station from 1999 to 2003. The lower theoretical developmental thresholds (the developmental zeros) for mycelial growth in B. dermoxantha, L. curtisii and C. lactea were estimated to be 14.6.DEG.C., 17.0.DEG.C. and 8.8.DEG.C., respectively, based on the linear relationships observed in the temperature ranges 5-35.DEG.C. The cumulative effect of average daily temperatures that exceeded the developmental zeros required for each fungus (total effective temperature) was assessed. The probits of the percentage of total fruit bodies against the total that emerged over the five-year period of the study correlated with the total effective temperature to give a ratio of contribution exceeded near 0.6. Similar correlations were also found between probits obtained from daily recordings of fruit body numbers in the observation plots under 170 m2 and total effective temperature. The observations of development in B. dermoxantha and C. lactea revealed that the average diameter and fruiting period of the fruit bodies was 11.5 mm and 5.8 days, and the average height and fruiting period were 36.8 mm and 1.8 days, respectively. One of the characteristics for these fungi is that they are short-lived.
