= Calvatia oblongispora =

Scientific classification
- Domain: Eukaryota
- Kingdom: Fungi
- Division: Basidiomycota
- Class: Agaricomycetes
- Order: Agaricales
- Family: Agaricaceae
- Genus: Calvatia
- Species: C. oblongispora

Binomial name
- Calvatia oblongispora V.L.Suárez, J.E.Wright & Calonge (2009)

Species of fungus

Calvatia oblongispora is a species of puffball from the genus Calvatia. Found in Brazil, it was described as new to science in 2009. The fruitbody is spherical or nearly so, measuring about 8–10 cm (3.1–3.9 in) in diameter. The thin, fragile peridium is readily detachable from the internal gleba. It is light beige and wrinkled, with a small, short, thin mycelium cord up to 5 mm long. The spores are cylindrical to ellipsoid in shape, hyaline (translucent), and measure 5.4–7.5 by 3.6–4.3 μm. They are covered in small spiny protrusions and have a single oil droplet within.
