= Calvatia arctica =

Scientific classification
- Domain: Eukaryota
- Kingdom: Fungi
- Division: Basidiomycota
- Class: Agaricomycetes
- Order: Agaricales
- Family: Agaricaceae
- Genus: Calvatia
- Species: C. arctica

Binomial name
- Calvatia arctica Ferd. & Winge (1910)

Synonyms
- Calvatia subcretacea Zeller (1947)

Species of fungus

Calvatia arctica is a species of puffball mushroom in the family Agaricaceae. Found in Greenland, it was first described scientifically by Carl Christian Frederic Ferdinandsen and Øjvind Winge in a 1910 publication.

Classification:	Fungi, Dikarya, Basidiomycota, Agaricomycotina, Agaricomycetes, Agaricomycetidae, Agaricales, Agaricaceae, Calvatia
