= Averil Maud Bottomley =

South African mycologist

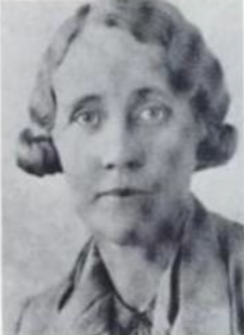
- Born: 23 December 1889
- Died: 23 February 1984 (aged 94)
- Occupation: mycologist
- Known for: founding member of the South African Biological Society

Averil Maud Bottomley (1889 – 1984) was a South African mycologist. She was a member of the Southern Africa Association for the Advancement of Science and a founding member of the South African Biological Society.

== Life ==
Averil Maud Bottomley was born on 23 December 1889 in Kimberley, Cape Colony. She was educated at Huguenot Seminary in Wellington and South Africa College (Cape Town University). In 1911, Bottomley was awarded the Bachelor of Arts degree by the University of the Cape of Good Hope and in 1912 passed college examination for the Teacher's Certificate at the South African College in Cape Town. For two years she taught at Worcester.

== Career ==
In 1913, Bottomley was appointed a mycologist. Since that time, she worked in the Division of Plant Pathology and Mycology of the Department of Agriculture in Pretoria. Bottomley dealt mainly with the Gasteromycetes of South Africa. She collected fungi mainly around Pretoria (especially Fountain's Valley), Greytown and Cape Town, and deposited them in the Mycological Herbarium (later the National Collection of Fungi of the Plant Protection Research Unit) in Pretoria.

In 1916, Bottomley became a member of the Southern Africa Association for the Advancement of Science. The same year she became a founding member of the South African Biological Society.

In 1926 she attended the International Congress of Plant Sciences in New York.

In 1929, Bottomley published a work The development of South African mycology and of the mycological herbarium at Pretoria in South African Journal of Science.

Bottomley retired from the Cryptogamic section of the National Herbarium, Pretoria. After her retirement she settled in Johannesburg.

Averil Maud Bottomley died on 23 February 1984 in Johannesburg.

She died 23 February 1984 in Johannesburg, South Africa.

== Selected publications ==
- A disease of young pepper trees (Agricultural Journal (Union of South Africa), 1915);
- Parasitic attack on Eucalyptus globulus (Ibid, 1920, with K.A. Carlson);
- An account of the Natal fungi collected by J. Medley Wood (Report of the South African Association for the Advancement of Science, 1916);
- A preliminary investigation into a disease attacking young Cupressus plants (Ibid, 1918);
- The fungus food of certain termites (South African Journal of Natural History, 1921, with C. Fuller);
- Some of the more important diseases affecting timber plantations in the Transvaal (South African Journal of Science, 1936);
- A revised list of plant diseases occurring in South Africa (1931, 78 pp., with E.M. Doidge);
- Gasteromycetes of South Africa (Bothalia, 1948);
- Common edible and poisonous mushrooms in South Africa (Department of Agriculture, 1953).
