= Stipe (mycology) =

Mushroom stalk

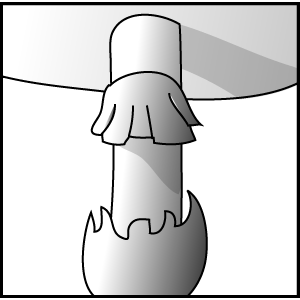
Diagram of a basidiomycete stipe with an annulus and volva.

In mycology, a stipe (/staɪp/) is the stem or stalk-like feature supporting the cap of a mushroom. Like all tissues of the mushroom other than the hymenium, the stipe is composed of sterile hyphal tissue. In many instances, however, the fertile hymenium extends down the stipe some distance. Fungi that have stipes are said to be stipitate.

== Evolutionary usage ==
The evolutionary benefit of a stipe is generally considered to be in mediating spore dispersal. An elevated mushroom will more easily release its spores into wind currents or onto passing animals. Nevertheless, many mushrooms do not have stipes; many mushrooms lack a distinct stipe, instead producing sessile or nearly sessile fruiting bodies attached directly to wood or other substrates. Examples include:

- Hericium erinaceus, which forms pendent spines from a rudimentary or absent stipe
- Pleurotus species, whose caps are laterally attached with reduced or missing stems
- Trametes versicolor, which grows as thin, stalkless brackets
- puffballs, including gasteroid puffballs in the genus Calvatia, which have no stipe
- Laetiporus species, which form large, sessile shelves without a true stem
- cup fungi
- earthstars
- some polypores
- jelly fungi
- ergots
- smuts

== Mushroom identification ==
It is often the case that features of the stipe are required to make a positive identification of a mushroom. Such distinguishing characters include:

1. the texture of the stipe (fibrous, brittle, chalky, leathery, firm, etc.)
2. whether it has remains of a partial veil (such as an annulus (ring) or cortina) or universal veil (volva)
3. whether the stipes of many mushrooms fuse at their base
4. its general size and shape
5. whether the stipe extends underground in a root-like structure (a rhizome)

When collecting mushrooms for identification it is critical to maintain all these characters intact by digging the mushroom out of the soil, rather than cutting it off mid-stipe.

== Drawings ==

with ring

with ring

with ring

with veil

remains of veil

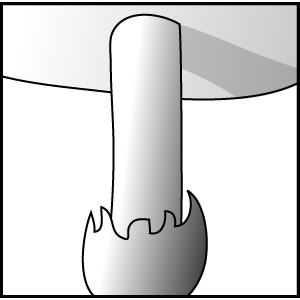
with volva
