= List of World Heritage Sites in Latin America and the Caribbean =

The United Nations Educational, Scientific and Cultural Organization (UNESCO) designates World Heritage Sites of outstanding universal value to cultural or natural heritage which have been nominated by signatories to the 1972 UNESCO World Heritage Convention. Cultural heritage consists of monuments (such as architectural works, monumental sculptures, or inscriptions), groups of buildings, and sites (including archaeological sites). Natural heritage includes natural features (consisting of physical and biological formations), geological and physiographical formations (including habitats of threatened species of animals and plants), and natural sites that are important from the point of view of science, conservation or natural beauty. UNESCO lists sites under ten criteria; each entry must meet at least one of the criteria. Criteria i through vi are cultural, and vii through x are natural. The implementation of the World Heritage Convention, the addition or removal of properties from the World Heritage List, and the allocation of funds, among other responsibilities, are managed by the World Heritage Committee. There are twenty-one state members on the committee. Although a term is a maximum of six years, most state parties choose to relinquish their responsibilities after four years so other countries can have the opportunity to be a member of the committee.

Latin America and the Caribbean is one of the five regions defined by UNESCO, alongside Africa, the Arab States, Asia and the Pacific and Europe and North America. It consists of 33 Latin American and Caribbean nations that have accepted the World Heritage Convention, making their historical sites eligible for inclusion on the list as World Heritage sites. (Note: Puerto Rico is in the Caribbean sea and is usually considered to be a part of Latin America, but as a territory of the United States its World Heritage Site, La Fortaleza and San Juan National Historic Site is grouped in the Europe and North America region.) The region has 155 properties on the World Heritage List. Of those properties, 107 were inscribed for their cultural significance, 40 for their natural significance, and 8 for both their natural and cultural significance–being termed mixed sites. (Note: The included reference shows 106 cultural sites, but it does not include The Architectural Work of Le Corbusier, a transnational site which is counted as a part of the Europe and North America region.) There are currently 7 World Heritage Sites in Latin America and the Caribbean that are endangered.

In addition to sites inscribed on the World Heritage List, member states can maintain a list of tentative sites that they may consider for nomination. Nominations for the World Heritage List are only accepted if the site was previously listed on the tentative list. The Latin America and the Caribbean region has 240 properties on the tentative list.

Location of World Heritage Sites in Latin America and the Caribbean. Red dots represent cultural sites, green triangles represent natural sites, and blue squares represent mixed sites.

Latin American and Caribbean state parties by World Heritage Sites and criteria, tentative listings, and World Heritage Committee service
| State | Cultural | Natural | Mixed | Total | Tentative | Service on World Heritage Committee | Date joined | Ref |
|---|---|---|---|---|---|---|---|---|
| Antigua and Barbuda | 1 | 0 | 0 | 1 | 0 | 0 times | 1 November 1983 | |
| Argentina | 7 | 5 | 0 | 12 | 8 | 3 times | 23 August 1978 | |
| Bahamas | 0 | 0 | 0 | 0 | 2 | 0 times | 15 May 2014 | |
| Barbados | 1 | 0 | 0 | 1 | 2 | 1 time | 9 April 2002 | |
| Belize | 0 | 1 | 0 | 1 | 0 | 0 times | 6 November 1990 | |
| Bolivia | 6 | 1 | 0 | 7 | 5 | 0 times | 4 October 1976 | |
| Brazil | 16 | 9 | 1 | 26 | 18 | 5 times | 1 September 1977 | |
| Chile | 7 | 0 | 0 | 7 | 19 | 1 time | 20 February 1980 | |
| Colombia | 6 | 2 | 1 | 9 | 13 | 3 times | 24 May 1983 | |
| Costa Rica | 1 | 3 | 0 | 4 | 1 | 0 times | 23 August 1977 | |
| Cuba | 7 | 2 | 0 | 9 | 14 | 4 times | 24 March 1981 | |
| Dominica | 0 | 1 | 0 | 1 | 3 | 0 times | 4 April 1995 | |
| Dominican Republic | 1 | 0 | 0 | 1 | 13 | 0 times | 12 February 1985 | |
| Ecuador | 3 | 2 | 0 | 5 | 15 | 2 times | 16 June 1975 | |
| El Salvador | 1 | 0 | 0 | 1 | 6 | 0 times | 8 October 1991 | |
| Grenada | 0 | 0 | 0 | 0 | 3 | 1 time | 13 August 1998 | |
| Guatemala | 3 | 0 | 1 | 4 | 22 | 1 time | 16 January 1979 | |
| Guyana | 0 | 0 | 0 | 0 | 5 | 0 times | 20 June 1977 | |
| Haiti | 0 | 1 | 0 | 1 | 2 | 0 times | 18 January 1980 | |
| Honduras | 1 | 1 | 0 | 2 | 4 | 0 times | 8 June 1979 | |
| Jamaica | 1 | 0 | 1 | 2 | 2 | 2 times | 14 June 1983 | |
| Mexico | 28 | 6 | 2 | 36 | 23 | 5 times | 23 February 1984 | |
| Nicaragua | 2 | 0 | 0 | 2 | 5 | 0 times | 17 December 1979 | |
| Panama | 2 | 3 | 0 | 5 | 1 | 1 time | 3 March 1978 | |
| Paraguay | 1 | 0 | 0 | 1 | 12 | 0 times | 27 April 1988 | |
| Peru | 9 | 2 | 2 | 13 | 25 | 4 times | 24 February 1982 | |
| Saint Kitts and Nevis | 1 | 0 | 0 | 1 | 2 | 1 time | 10 July 1986 | |
| Saint Lucia | 0 | 1 | 0 | 1 | 0 | 1 time | 14 October 1991 | |
| Saint Vincent and the Grenadines | 0 | 0 | 0 | 0 | 3 | 1 time | 3 February 2003 | |
| Suriname | 2 | 1 | 0 | 3 | 0 | 0 times | 23 October 1997 | |
| Trinidad and Tobago | 0 | 0 | 0 | 0 | 3 | 0 times | 16 February 2005 | |
| Uruguay | 3 | 0 | 0 | 3 | 6 | 0 times | 9 March 1989 | |
| Venezuela | 2 | 1 | 0 | 3 | 3 | 0 times | 30 October 1990 | |

== Antigua and Barbuda ==
=== World Heritage Sites ===
- Antigua Naval Dockyard and Related Archaeological Sites

=== Tentative list ===
As of 2026, Antigua and Barbuda does not maintain any sites on its tentative list.

== Argentina ==
=== World Heritage Sites ===
- Los Glaciares National Park
- Jesuit Missions of the Guaranis: San Ignacio Mini, Santa Ana, Nuestra Señora de Loreto and Santa Maria Mayor (Argentina), Ruins of Sao Miguel das Missoes (Brazil)
- Iguazú National Park
- Cueva de las Manos, Río Pinturas
- Península Valdés
- Ischigualasto / Talampaya Natural Parks
- Jesuit Block and Estancias of Córdoba
- Quebrada de Humahuaca
- Qhapaq Ñan, Andean Road System
- The Architectural Work of Le Corbusier, an Outstanding Contribution to the Modern Movement (Note: This is a transnational serial nomination which includes the Curutchet House in Argentina.)
- Los Alerces National Park
- ESMA Museum and Site of Memory – Former Clandestine Center of Detention, Torture and Extermination

=== Tentative list ===
- Valle Calchaquí
- Sierra de las Quijadas National Park
- La Payunia, Campos Volcánicos Llancanelo y Payún Matrú
- Geological, Paleontological and Archaeological Provincial Reserve Pehuén Co–Monte Hermoso
- Moisés Ville
- City of Tigre and its rowing clubs
- Cueva de las Manos and associated sites of the Pinturas River basin
- Workers' Assembly Halls (Argentina)

== Bahamas ==
=== World Heritage Sites ===
As of 2026, The Bahamas does not have any sites inscribed on the World Heritage List.

=== Tentative list ===
- Historic Lighthouses of The Bahamas
- The Inagua National Park

== Barbados ==
=== World Heritage Sites ===
- Historic Bridgetown and its Garrison

=== Tentative list ===
- The Scotland District of Barbados
- The Industrial Heritage of Barbados: The Story of Sugar and Rum

== Belize ==
=== World Heritage Sites ===
- Belize Barrier Reef Reserve System

=== Tentative list ===
As of 2026, Belize does not maintain any sites on its tentative list.

== Bolivia ==
=== World Heritage Sites ===
- City of Potosí
- Jesuit Missions of the Chiquitos
- Historic City of Sucre
- Fuerte de Samaipata
- Tiwanaku: Spiritual and Political Centre of the Tiwanaku Culture
- Noel Kempff Mercado National Park
- Qhapaq Ñan, Andean Road System

=== Tentative list ===
- Sajama National Park
- Pulacayo, Industrial Heritage Site
- Incallajta, the largest Inca site in the Kollasuyo
- Cal Orck'o: Footprints of time
- Sacred Titicaca Lake

== Brazil ==
=== World Heritage Sites ===
- Historic Town of Ouro Preto
- Historic Centre of the Town of Olinda
- Jesuit Missions of the Guaranis: San Ignacio Mini, Santa Ana, Nuestra Señora de Loreto and Santa Maria Mayor (Argentina), Ruins of São Miguel das Missões (Brazil)
- Historic Centre of Salvador de Bahia
- Sanctuary of Bom Jesus de Matosinhos
- Iguaçu National Park
- Brasília
- Serra da Capivara National Park
- Historic Centre of São Luís
- Historic Centre of the Town of Diamantina
- Discovery Coast Atlantic Forest Reserves
- Atlantic Forest South-East Reserves
- Historic Centre of the Town of Goiás
- Central Amazon Conservation Complex
- Pantanal Conservation Area
- Brazilian Atlantic Islands: Fernando de Noronha and Atol das Rocas Reserves
- Cerrado Protected Areas: Chapada dos Veadeiros and Emas National Parks
- São Francisco Square in the Town of São Cristóvão
- Rio de Janeiro: Carioca Landscapes Between the Mountain and the Sea
- Pampulha Modern Ensemble
- Valongo Wharf Archaeological Site
- Paraty and Ilha Grande - Culture and Biodiversity
- Sítio Roberto Burle Marx
- Lençóis Maranhenses National Park
- Cavernas do Peruaçu National Park
- Amazonia Theaters

=== Tentative list ===
- Church and Monastery of São Bento, Rio de Janeiro
- Palace of Culture, former headquarters of the Ministry of Education and Health, Rio de Janeiro
- Pico da Neblina National Park (Amazonas)
- Taim Ecological Station (Rio Grande do Sul)
- Serra do Divisor National Park
- Serra da Canastra National Park
- Cavernas do Peruaçu Federal Environmental Protection Area (APA) / Veredas Do Peruaçu State Park
- Cultural Landscape of Paranapiacaba: Village and railway systems in the Serra do Mar Mountain Range
- Ver-o-Peso
- Brazilian Fortresses Ensemble
- Cedro Dam in the Quixadá Monoliths
- Geoglyphs of Acre
- Itacoatiaras of Ingá River
- Sociobiodiverse Cultural Basin of the Chapada do Araripe
- Oswaldo Cruz Foundation: health, science and culture in Manguinhos
- Protected Areas of the Caatinga Dry Tropical Forest
- Golden lion tamarin Protected Areas
- Abrolhos Marine National Park

== Chile ==
=== World Heritage Sites ===
- Rapa Nui National Park
- Churches of Chiloé
- Historic Quarter of the Seaport City of Valparaíso
- Humberstone and Santa Laura Saltpeter Works
- Sewell Mining Town
- Qhapaq Ñan, Andean Road System
- Settlement and Artificial Mummification of the Chinchorro Culture in the Arica and Parinacota Region

=== Tentative list ===
- Torres del Paine and Bernardo O'Higgins National Parks, Region of Magallanes
- Juan Fernández Archipelago National Park
- Fell and Pali Aike Caves
- Rupestrian art of the Patagonia
- The Defensive Complex of Valdivia
- Locomotive depot of the Temuco Train Station
- Malleco Viaduct
- Houses of the hacienda San José del Carmen el Huique
- San Francisco Church and Convent
- La Moneda Palace
- Cerro El Plomo high shrine
- Ayquina and Toconce
- San Pedro de Atacama
- Baquedano Street
- Churches of the Altiplano
- Monte Verde Archaeological Site
- Lota Mining Complex
- Chilean Pisco Vine and Wine Cultural Landscape
- Pintados Geoglyphs Archaeological Complex in the Tarapacá Region

== Colombia ==
=== World Heritage Sites ===
- Port, Fortresses and Group of Monuments, Cartagena
- Los Katíos National Park
- Historic Centre of Santa Cruz de Mompox
- National Archeological Park of Tierradentro
- San Agustín Archaeological Park
- Malpelo Fauna and Flora Sanctuary
- Coffee Cultural Landscape of Colombia
- Qhapaq Ñan, Andean Road System
- Chiribiquete National Park – "The Maloca of the Jaguar"

=== Tentative list ===
- Seaflower Marine Protected Area (MPA)
- Canal del Dique - Dike Canal
- University City of Bogotá
- Pre-Hispanic Hydraulic System of the San Jorge River
- Tayrona and Sierra Nevada de Santa Marta National Parks and their Archaeological Sites
- Catholic Doctrine Temples
- United Fruit Company Infrastructure
- South of Ricaurte Province
- Puente de Occidente (Western Bridge)
- Cultural Landscape of the Vernacular Stilt Housing of Cienaga Grande de Santa Marta and of Medio Atrato
- The architectural legacy of Rogelio Salmona: an ethical, political, social and poetic manifesto
- Paleontological Sites of the Middle Devonian of Floresta, Boyacá
- The La Venta Konzentrat-Lagerstätte: a Neotropical moist forest biome of the middle Miocene

== Costa Rica ==
=== World Heritage Sites ===
- Talamanca Range-La Amistad Reserves / La Amistad National Park
- Cocos Island National Park
- Area de Conservación Guanacaste
- Precolumbian Chiefdom Settlements with Stone Spheres of the Diquís

=== Tentative list ===
- Corcovado National Park and Isla del Caño Biological Reserve

== Cuba ==
=== World Heritage Sites ===
- Old Havana and its Fortifications
- Trinidad and the Valley de los Ingenios
- San Pedro de la Roca Castle, Santiago de Cuba
- Desembarco del Granma National Park
- Viñales Valley
- Archaeological Landscape of the First Coffee Plantations in the South-East of Cuba
- Alejandro de Humboldt National Park
- Historic Centre of Cienfuegos
- Historic Centre of Camagüey

=== Tentative list ===
- Ciénaga de Zapata National Park
- National Schools of Art, Cubanacán (Note: Although National Schools of Art, Cubanacán and Escuelas Nacionales de Arte de Cubanacán refer to the same site, they are listed as different entries in Cuba's tentative list.)
- Escuelas Nacionales de Arte de Cubanacán
- Reef System in the Cuban Caribbean
- Tropicana Club
- Vedado, an early garden city
- Central Campus of the University of Havana
- Triolet French Drugstore (Pharmacy Museum)
- Santiago de Cuba: Its Historic Settings
- Sites of Memory of Slavery in Cuba
- Caguanes National Park
- The National Park Ciénaga de Zapata and the Speleological-Lacustrine System
- Reef System of the Cuban Caribbean
- Albear Aqueduct

== Dominica ==
=== World Heritage Sites ===
- Morne Trois Pitons National Park

=== Tentative list ===
- Fort Shirley
- Morne Diablotin National Park
- Soufriere-Scott's Head Marine Reserve

== Dominican Republic ==
=== World Heritage Sites ===
- Colonial City of Santo Domingo

=== Tentative list ===
- Jacagua, Villa of Santiago
- Montecristi
- Archaeological and Historical National Park of Pueblo Viejo, La Vega
- Historical Centre of Puerto Plata
- City of Azúa de Compostela
- Sanate Sugar Mill
- Nuestra Señora de Monte Alegre or la Duquesa Sugar Mill
- Villa La Isabela Archaeological Site
- Jaragua National Park
- First Colonial Engines of America
- Cotubanamá National Park
- Marine Mammals Sanctuary Bancos de La Plata and Navidad
- Pre-Hispanic rock art of the Dominican Republic

== Ecuador ==
=== World Heritage Sites ===
- Galápagos Islands
- City of Quito
- Sangay National Park
- Historic Centre of Santa Ana de los Ríos de Cuenca
- Qhapaq Ñan, Andean Road System

=== Tentative list ===
- Machalilla National Park
- Puyango Petrified Forest
- Zaruma mining town
- Cultural Itinerary of Ecuador's Trans-Andean Train
- Mayo-Chinchipe - Marañón archaeological landscape
- Galápagos Islands (extension)
- Puñay Cultural Landscape
- Manteño Culture, lordships of land and sea
- Yacuviña Archaeological Complex
- El Angel Ecological Reserve
- El Quimi Biological Reserve – Sandstone Plateaus
- Chimborazo Wildlife Reserve
- The Andean Chocó Cloud Forest – Soundscape
- Churute Mangroves Ecological Reserve
- Ecuadorian Cacao Cultural Landscape

== El Salvador ==
=== World Heritage Sites ===
- Joya de Cerén Archaeological Site

=== Tentative list ===
- Gulf of Fonseca
- Cara Sucia / El Imposible
- Chalchuapa
- Ciudad Vieja / La Bermuda
- Lake Güija
- Cacaopera

== Grenada ==
=== World Heritage Sites ===
As of 2025, Grenada does not have any sites inscribed on the World Heritage list.

=== Tentative list ===
- St. George Historic District
- St. George Fortified System
- Grenadines Island Group

== Guatemala ==
=== World Heritage Sites ===
- Tikal National Park
- Antigua Guatemala
- Archaeological Park and Ruins of Quirigua
- National Archaeological Park Tak'alik Ab'aj

=== Tentative list ===
- The Cultural Triangle
- The Cuenca Mirador
- The Core of the Mayan Area
- The Route of The Rivers
- Naj Tunich Cave
- The Mayan-Olmecan Encounter
- Route of the Franciscan Evangelisation
- Route of the Dominican Evangelisation
- Route of the Peace and National Identity
- Castle of San Felipe de Lara
- Route of the Agroindustry and the Architecture Victoriana
- Town of Chichicastenango
- The Green Route of Verapaz, Guatemala
- Sierra De Las Minas Biosphere Reservation
- National Park Sierra del Lacandón
- The Manglares Route of Pacific Coast of Guatemala
- Protected area of Lake Atitlán: multiple use
- Visis Cabá National park and Triangulo Ixil Vernacular Architecture
- The Painted Murals of San Bartolo
- The Caves of Naj Tunich
- Archeological Site Naranjo Sa'aal
- National Theater of Guatemala

== Guyana ==
=== World Heritage Sites ===
As of 2025, Guyana does not have any sites inscribed on the World Heritage List.

=== Tentative list ===
- St. Georges Anglican Cathedral
- Fort Zeelandia (including Court of Policy Building)
- City Hall, Georgetown
- Shell Beach (Almond Beach) Essequibo Coast
- Georgetown's Plantation Structure and Historic Buildings

== Haiti ==
=== World Heritage Sites ===
- National History Park – Citadel, Sans Souci, Ramiers

=== Tentative list ===
- Historic Center of Jacmel
- National Historic Park of Matheux - Coffee, Slavery, and Freedom Trail

== Honduras ==
=== World Heritage Sites ===
- Maya Site of Copán
- Río Plátano Biosphere Reserve

=== Tentative list ===
- Río Plátano Biosphere Reserve (natural extension)
- San Fernando de Omoa Fortress
- El Gigante Rockshelter
- Mining Towns of Central and Southern Honduras: Santa Lucía, Cedros, Ojojona-Guazucarán, San Antonio de Oriente, Tegucigalpa, Yuscarán, El Corpus

== Jamaica ==
=== World Heritage Sites ===
- Blue and John Crow Mountains
- The Archaeological Ensemble of 17th Century Port Royal

=== Tentative list ===
- Seville Heritage Park
- Cockpit Country Protected Area

== Mexico ==
=== World Heritage Sites ===
- Sian Ka'an
- Pre-Hispanic City and National Park of Palenque
- Historic Center of Mexico City and Xochimilco
- Pre-Hispanic City of Teotihuacán
- Historic Centre of Oaxaca and Archaeological site of Monte Albán
- Historic Centre of Puebla
- Historic Town of Guanajuato and Adjacent Mines
- Pre-Hispanic City of Chichen-Itza
- Historic Centre of Morelia
- El Tajín, Pre-Hispanic City
- Rock Paintings of the Sierra de San Francisco
- Whale Sanctuary of El Vizcaino
- Historic Centre of Zacatecas
- Earliest 16th-Century Monasteries on the Slopes of Popocatepetl
- Historic Monuments Zone of Querétaro
- Pre-Hispanic Town of Uxmal
- Hospicio Cabañas, Guadalajara
- Historic Monuments Zone of Tlacotalpan
- Archaeological Zone of Paquimé, Casas Grandes
- Historic Fortified Town of Campeche
- Archaeological Monuments Zone of Xochicalco
- Ancient Maya City and Protected Tropical Forests of Calakmul, Campeche
- Franciscan Missions in the Sierra Gorda of Querétaro
- Luis Barragán House and Studio
- Islands and Protected Areas of the Gulf of California
- Agave Landscape and Ancient Industrial Facilities of Tequila
- Central University City Campus of the Universidad Nacional Autónoma de México (UNAM)
- Monarch Butterfly Biosphere Reserve
- Protective town of San Miguel de Allende and the Sanctuary of Jesús Nazareno de Atotonilco
- Camino Real de Tierra Adentro
- Prehistoric Caves of Yagul and Mitla in the Central Valley of Oaxaca
- El Pinacate and Gran Desierto de Altar Biosphere Reserve
- Aqueduct of Padre Tembleque Hydraulic System
- Revillagigedo Archipelago
- Tehuacán-Cuicatlán Valley: originary habitat of Mesoamerica
- Wixárika Route through Sacred Sites to Wirikuta (Tatehuarí Huajuyé)

=== Tentative list ===
- Chapultepec Woods, Hill and Castle
- Historic Town of Alamos
- Church of Santa Prisca and its Surroundings
- Pre-Hispanic City of Cantona
- Great City of Chicomostoc-La Quemada
- Historic Town of San Sebastián del Oeste
- Diego Rivera and Frida Kahlo's Home-Study Museum
- Valle de los Cirios
- Flora and Fauna Protection Area of Cuatro Ciénegas
- Historical Town The Royal of the Eleven Thousand Virgins of Cosala in Sinaloa
- Lacan-Tún – Usumacinta Region
- Banco Chinchorro Biosphere Reserve
- Tecoaque
- Cuetzalan and its Historical, Cultural and Natural Surrounding
- Historical city of Izamal (Izamal, Mayan continuity in an Historical City)
- Los Petenes-Ría Celestún
- Las Pozas, Xilitla
- El Arco del Tiempo del Río La Venta
- Ring of cenotes of Chicxulub Crater, Yucatan
- Las Labradas, Sinaloa archaeological site
- Patzcuaro, Site of Humanistic Memory and Cultural Confluence
- San Juan de Ulua, Site of Memory and Historical Resistances
- Historic University District (extension of Historic Centre of Puebla)

== Nicaragua ==
=== World Heritage Sites ===
- Ruins of León Viejo
- León Cathedral

=== Tentative list ===
- Fortress of the Immaculate Conception
- The Natural Reserve "Miskitos Keys"
- The Natural Reserve "Bosawás"
- Volcan Masaya National Park
- City of Granada and its natural environment

== Panama ==
=== World Heritage Sites ===
- Fortifications on the Caribbean Side of Panama: Portobelo-San Lorenzo
- Darién National Park
- Talamanca Range-La Amistad Reserves / La Amistad National Park
- Coiba National Park and its Special Zone of Marine Protection
- The Colonial Transisthmian Route of Panamá

=== Tentative list ===
- Archaeological Site and Historic Centre of Panamá City

== Paraguay ==
=== World Heritage Sites ===
- Jesuit Missions of La Santísima Trinidad de Paraná and Jesús de Tavarangue

=== Tentative list ===
- Rock Art of Jsukaevnda and Cerro Corá
- Defensores del Chaco National Park
- Médanos del Chaco National Park
- Yerba Mate Cultural Landscape
- Jesuit Mission of San Cosme y San Damián
- San Buenaventura Church in Yaguarón
- Paraguayan Pantanal
- Railway Complex and English Village of Sapucai
- Mbaracayú Forest Nature Reserve
- President Carlos Antonio López Railway System
- Ybyturuzú National Park
- Tinfunqué National Park

== Peru ==
=== World Heritage Sites ===
- City of Cuzco
- Historic Sanctuary of Machu Picchu
- Chavín (Archaeological Site)
- Huascarán National Park
- Chan Chan Archaeological Zone
- Manu National Park
- Historic Centre of Lima
- Rio Abiseo National Park
- Lines and Geoglyphs of Nazca and Pampas de Jumana
- Historical Centre of the City of Arequipa
- Sacred City of Caral-Supe
- Qhapaq Ñan, Andean Road System
- Chankillo Archaeoastronomical Complex

=== Tentative list ===
- Historic Center of the City of Trujillo
- The Historic Centre of Cajamarca
- Lake Titicaca
- Santa Bárbara mining complex
- Salt Mines of Maras
- Baroque Temples of Collao
- Rural Temples of Cusco
- Nasca Aqueducts
- Archaeological Complex of Toro Muerto
- Archaeological complex of Marcahuamachuco
- Chachapoyas sites of the Utcubamba Valley
- Battlefield of Ayacucho
- Wineries and Vineyards for traditional Pisco Production
- Las Huaringas Lagoons
- Peruvian Central Railway
- Cultural Landscape of the Sondondo Valley
- Paleontological Sites of Pisco and Camana Basins
- Ceremonial Centers and Forests in the La Leche Valley
- Sierra del Divisor National Park
- Huayllay National Sanctuary
- Guano Islands, Islets, and Capes National Reserve System form Peru (RNSIIPG)
- Landscape Reserve Sub Cuenca del Cotahuasi
- The Coastal Lomas System of Peru
- Real Felipe Fortress of Callao
- Chankillo and the Monumental Astronomical Traditions of the Casma, Sechin, and Nepeña Valleys

== Saint Kitts and Nevis ==
=== World Heritage Sites ===
- Brimstone Hill Fortress National Park

=== Tentative list ===
- Historic zone of Basseterre
- City of Charlestown

== Saint Lucia ==
=== World Heritage Sites ===
- Pitons Management Area

=== Tentative list ===
As of 2026, Saint Lucia does not maintain any sites on its tentative list.

== Saint Vincent and the Grenadines ==
=== World Heritage Sites ===
As of 2026, Saint Vincent and the Grenadines does not have any sites on the World Herigate List.

=== Tentative list ===
- Rock Art of St. Vincent and the Grenadines
- Grenadines Island Group
- The La Soufrière National Park

== Suriname ==
=== World Heritage Sites ===
- Central Suriname Nature Reserve
- Historic Inner City of Paramaribo
- Jodensavanne Archaeological Site: Jodensavanne Settlement and Cassipora Creek Cemetery

=== Tentative list ===
As of 2026, Suriname does not maintain any sites on its tentative list.

== Trinidad and Tobago ==
=== World Heritage Sites ===
As of 2026, Trinidad and Tobago does not have any sites inscribed on the World Heritage List.

=== Tentative list ===
- Banwari Trace Archaeological Site
- La Brea Pitch Lake
- Tobago Main Ridge Forest Reserve

== Uruguay ==
=== World Heritage Sites ===
- Historic Quarter of the City of Colonia del Sacramento
- Fray Bentos Industrial Landscape
- The work of engineer Eladio Dieste: Church of Atlántida

=== Tentative list ===
- Chamangá: A Rock Paintings Area
- Insular area and bay of Colonia del Sacramento
- Rambla of Montevideo
- Modern architecture of the 20th century of the City of Montevideo
- Peñarol District: the historic Old Town and the industrial railway landscape
- Isla de Flores Cultural Landscape and its fluvio-marine context

== Venezuela ==
=== World Heritage Sites ===
- Coro and its Port
- Canaima National Park
- Ciudad Universitaria de Caracas

=== Tentative list ===
- City of "La Guaira"
- Hacienda Chuao (Chuao Plantation)
- Ciudad Bolivar in the narrowness of the Orinoco River
