= List of World Heritage Sites in Guatemala =

Location of World Heritage Sites in Guatemala. Red dots represent cultural sites, while the blue dot is a mixed site. The site of Antigua Guatemala is shown in purple.

The United Nations Educational, Scientific and Cultural Organization (UNESCO) World Heritage Sites are places of importance to cultural or natural heritage as described in the UNESCO World Heritage Convention, established in 1972. Cultural heritage consists of monuments (such as architectural works, monumental sculptures, or inscriptions), groups of buildings, and sites (including archaeological sites). Natural features (consisting of physical and biological formations), geological and physiographical formations (including habitats of threatened species of animals and plants), and natural sites which are important from the point of view of science, conservation, or natural beauty, are defined as natural heritage.

The Republic of Guatemala accepted the convention on January 16, 1979, making its historical sites eligible for inclusion on the list. As of 2023, Guatemala has four World Heritage Sites, Takalik Abaj, the most recent was inscribed in 2023. Guatemala has served as a member of the World Heritage Committee once, 2017–2021.

== World Heritage Sites ==
UNESCO lists sites under ten criteria; each entry must meet at least one of the criteria. Criteria i through vi are cultural, and vii through x are natural.

World Heritage Sites
Site	Image	Location (department)	Year listed	UNESCO data	Description
Tikal National Park		Petén	1979	64; i, iii, iv, ix, x (mixed)	In the heart of the jungle, surrounded by lush vegetation, lies one of the major sites of Mayan civilization, inhabited from the 6th century B.C. to the 10th century A.D. The ceremonial centre contains superb temples and palaces, and public squares accessed by means of ramps. Remains of dwellings are scattered throughout the surrounding countryside.
Antigua Guatemala		Sacatepéquez	1979	65; ii, iii, iv (cultural)	Antigua, the capital of the Captaincy-General of Guatemala, was founded in the early 16th century. Built 1,500 m above sea-level, in an earthquake-prone region, it was largely destroyed by an earthquake in 1773 but its principal monuments are still preserved as ruins. In the space of under three centuries the city, which was built on a grid pattern inspired by the Italian Renaissance, acquired a number of superb monuments.
Archaeological Park and Ruins of Quirigua		Izabal	1981	149; i, ii, iv (cultural)	Inhabited since the 2nd century A.D., Quirigua had become during the reign of Cauac Sky (723–84) the capital of an autonomous and prosperous state. The ruins of Quirigua contain some outstanding 8th-century monuments and an impressive series of carved stelae and sculpted calendars that constitute an essential source for the study of Mayan civilization.
National Archaeological Park Tak’alik Ab’aj		Retalhuleu	2023	1663; ii, iii (cultural)	Tak’alik Ab’aj is an archaeological site located on the Pacific Coast of Guatemala. Its 1,700-year history spans a period that saw the transition from the Olmec civilization to the emergence of Early Mayan culture. Tak’alik Ab’aj had a primary role in this transition, in part because it was vital to the long-distance trade route that connected the Isthmus of Tehuantepec in today's Mexico to present-day El Salvador. Ideas and customs were shared extensively along this route. Sacred spaces and buildings were laid out according to cosmological principles, and innovative water management systems, ceramics, and lapidary art can be found. Today, Indigenous groups of different affiliations still consider the site a sacred place and visit it to perform rituals.

== Tentative list ==
In addition to sites inscribed on the World Heritage List, member states can maintain a list of tentative sites that they may consider for nomination. Nominations for the World Heritage List are only accepted if the site was previously listed on the tentative list. Guatemala has twenty-two properties on its tentative list.

Tentative sites
Site	Image	Location (department)	Year listed	UNESCO criteria	Description
The Cultural Triangle		Petén	2002	(mixed)	
The Cuenca Mirador		Petén	2002	(mixed)	
The Core of the Mayan Area		Petén	2002	(mixed)	
The Route of The Rivers		Petén	2002	(mixed)	
Naj Tunich Cave		Petén	2002	(mixed)	
The Mayan-Olmecan Encounter		Retalhuleu	2002	(mixed)	
Route of the Franciscan Evangelisation		Central and Western region of Guatemala	2002	i, iv, v, vi (cultural)	
Route of the Dominican Evangelisation			2002	i, iv, v, vi	
Route of the Peace and National Identity			2002	iv, vi (cultural)	
Castle of San Felipe de Lara		Izabal	2002	iv (cultural)	
Route of the Agroindustry and the Architecture Victoriana			2002	iv (cultural)	
Town of Chichicastenango		El Quiché	2002	v, vi (cultural)	
The Green Route of Verapaz, Guatemala		Alta Verapaz	2002	vii (natural)	
Sierra De Las Minas Biosphere Reservation		Alta Verapaz, Baja Verapaz, El Progreso, Izabal and Zacapa	2002	vii, viii, ix, x (natural)	
National Park Sierra del Lacandón		Petén	2002	(mixed)	
The Manglares Route of Pacific Coast of Guatemala		Escuintla, Jutiapa, Retalhuleu, San Marcos, Santa Rosa and Suchitepéquez	2002	vii (natural)	
Protected area of Lake Atitlán: multiple use		Sololá	2002	vii, viii, ix (natural)	
Visis Cabá National park and Triangulo Ixil Vernacular Architecture		El Quiché	2002	(mixed)	
The Painted Murals of San Bartolo		Petén	2012	i, ii (cultural)	
The Caves of Naj Tunich		Petén	2012	i, iii, v, vi, vii (cultural)	
Archeological Site Naranjo Sa’aal		Petén	2022	ii, iv, vi (cultural)	
National Theater of Guatemala		Guatemala	2022	i, iv (cultural)	
