= List of World Heritage Sites in Dominican Republic =

Location of World Heritage Sites in Dominican Republic

The United Nations Educational, Scientific and Cultural Organization (UNESCO) World Heritage Sites are places of importance to cultural or natural heritage as described in the UNESCO World Heritage Convention, established in 1972. Cultural heritage consists of monuments (such as architectural works, monumental sculptures, or inscriptions), groups of buildings, and sites (including archaeological sites). Natural features (consisting of physical and biological formations), geological and physiographical formations (including habitats of threatened species of animals and plants), and natural sites which are important from the point of view of science, conservation or natural beauty, are defined as natural heritage. Dominican Republic accepted the convention on February 12, 1985, making its historical sites eligible for inclusion on the list. As of 2023, Dominican Republic has only one World Heritage Site, Colonial city of Santo Domingo, which was inscribed in 1990.

== World Heritage Sites ==
UNESCO lists sites under ten criteria; each entry must meet at least one of the criteria. Criteria i through vi are cultural, and vii through x are natural.

World Heritage Sites
Site	Image	Location (province)	Year listed	UNESCO data	Description
Colonial City of Santo Domingo	A basilica in the Colonial City of Santo Domingo	Distrito Nacional	1990	526bis; ii, iv, vi	After Christopher Columbus's arrival on the island in 1492, Santo Domingo became the site of the first cathedral, hospital, customs house and university in the Americas. This colonial town, founded in 1498, was laid out on a grid pattern that became the model for almost all town planners in the New World.

== Tentative list ==
In addition to sites inscribed on the World Heritage List, member states can maintain a list of tentative sites that they may consider for nomination. Nominations for the World Heritage List are only accepted if the site was previously listed on the tentative list. As of 2025, the Dominican Republic has listed thirteen properties on its tentative list.

Tentative sites
Site	Image	Location (province)	Year listed	UNESCO criteria	Description
Jacagua, Villa of Santiago		Santiago Province	2001	(cutural)	
Montecristi	A house in Montecristi, with a tree on the left	Monte Cristi Province	2001	(cultural)	
Archaeological and Historical National Park of Pueblo Viejo, La Vega	The ruins of the Vega Fort from a bird's eye view	La Vega Province	2001	(cultural)	
Historical Centre of Puerto Plata	Two cannons pointing at the sea	Puerto Plata Province	2001	(cultural)	
City of Azúa de Compostela	An apartment with a tree on the left	Azua Province	2001	(cultural)	
Sanate Sugar Mill		La Altagracia Province	2002	ii, iv, vi (cultural)	
Nuestra Señora de Monte Alegre or la Duquesa Sugar Mill		Distrito Nacional	2002	ii, iv vi (cultural)	
Villa La Isabela Archaeological Site		Puerto Plata Province	2018	ii, v (cultural)	
Jaragua National Park	Looking down on a canyon with desert vegetation	Pedernales Province	2018	i, iii, vii, ix, x (culural)	
First Colonial Engines of America		San Cristóbal Province, Santo Domingo Province	2018	ii, vi (cultural)	
Cotubanamá National Park	The beach, the sea is on the right and palm trees are on the left	La Altagracia Province, La Romana Province	2018	i, ii, iii (cultural)	
Marine Mammals Sanctuary Bancos de La Plata and Navidad	Two buoys in the sea	None, offshore	2018	iii, ix, x (mixed)	
Pre-Hispanic rock art of the Dominican Republic	Cave paintings	Hato Mayor Province, La Altagracia Province, Pedernales Province, San Cristóbal Province	2018	i, iii (cultural)	

== See also ==
- List of World Heritage Sites in Haiti
- List of World Heritage Sites in South America
- Tourism in the Dominican Republic
