= Macrofungi of Guatemala =

Guatemala is one of the richest biodiversity hotspots in the world. This is due to the variety of its territory and ecosystems that occur from sea level up to more than 4,000 meters above sea level. Ecological niches include (but are not limited to) subtropical and tropical rain forests, wetlands, dry forests, scrublands, cloud forests, and pine-fir forests in the highlands. Despite this wealth, however, our knowledge on the mycobiota of the country is very poor. There are several reasons for this, primarily the prolonged Guatemalan civil war (1960–1996) and related political and social instability that have severely hampered field work in the country. The lack of trained local mycologists has certainly also delayed the detailed investigation of the rich mycota inhabiting the highly diversified Guatemalan biotopes.

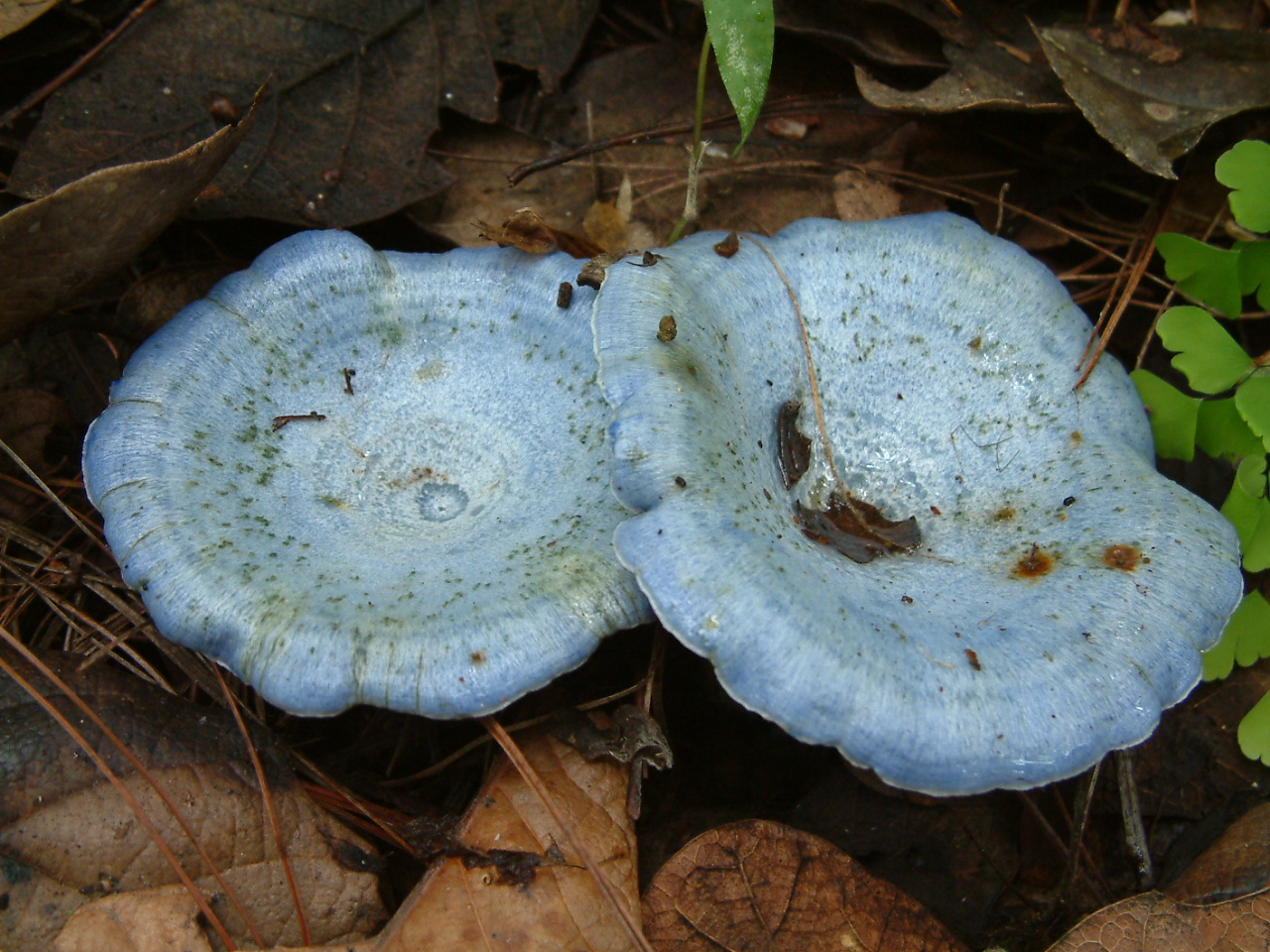
A couple of fresh Lactarius indigo sporocarps, photographed in Altavista, Guatemala City

== Diversity ==
Larger fungi (usually referred to as macrofungi or macromycetes) are of particular interest because of their importance as food resources and as a component of traditional culture in many places. Moreover, many basidiomycetes and ascomycetes with conspicuous sporocarps often play an important role as ectomycorrhizal mycobionts of trees and shrubs of boreal forests in the Northern Hemisphere and are important elements in many areas of the Southern Hemisphere. Although Guatemalan macrofungi have not been as yet extensively surveyed, a preliminary checklist encompasses some 350 species of macromycetes (31 ascomycetes and 319 basidiomycetes) occurring in 163 genera and 20 ascomycetous and basidiomycetous orders. Recently, 12 species of Ascomycetes where cited, with the new records, there are now 44 ascomycete species known from Guatemala Most available observations pertain to the highlands, in the departments of Alta Verapaz, Baja Verapaz, Chimaltenango, Guatemala, El Quiché, Huehuetenango, and Quetzaltenango, while the wide lowland Petén region has been scantly explored, despite the fact that it accounts for about one third of Guatemala's area and, together with adjacent areas of Belize and southern Mexico, comprise the largest unbroken tract of tropical forest north of the Brazilian Amazon. At the order level, Agaricales was found to host the larger number of species (almost one third of the entire set), followed by Polyporales and Boletales. The most represented genera are Amanita, Russula, Lactarius, Laccaria, Suillus. Intriguingly, all these genera are ectomycorrhizal with the several Pinus and Quercus species that form extensive pine and mixed forests of the highlands, and/or with the endangered Abies guatemalensis (pinabete), most abundant between 2800–3200 m elevation on the Sierra de los Cuchumatanes in western Guatemala.

== Traditional knowledge and use ==
"The Mesoamerican tradition of eating wild edible fungi continues from Mexico to west Guatemala then is absent from much of Honduras and Nicaragua, even though both contain forest areas that in theory support production of edible fungi", remarked Eric Boa in his reference volume on worldwide wild edible fungi.

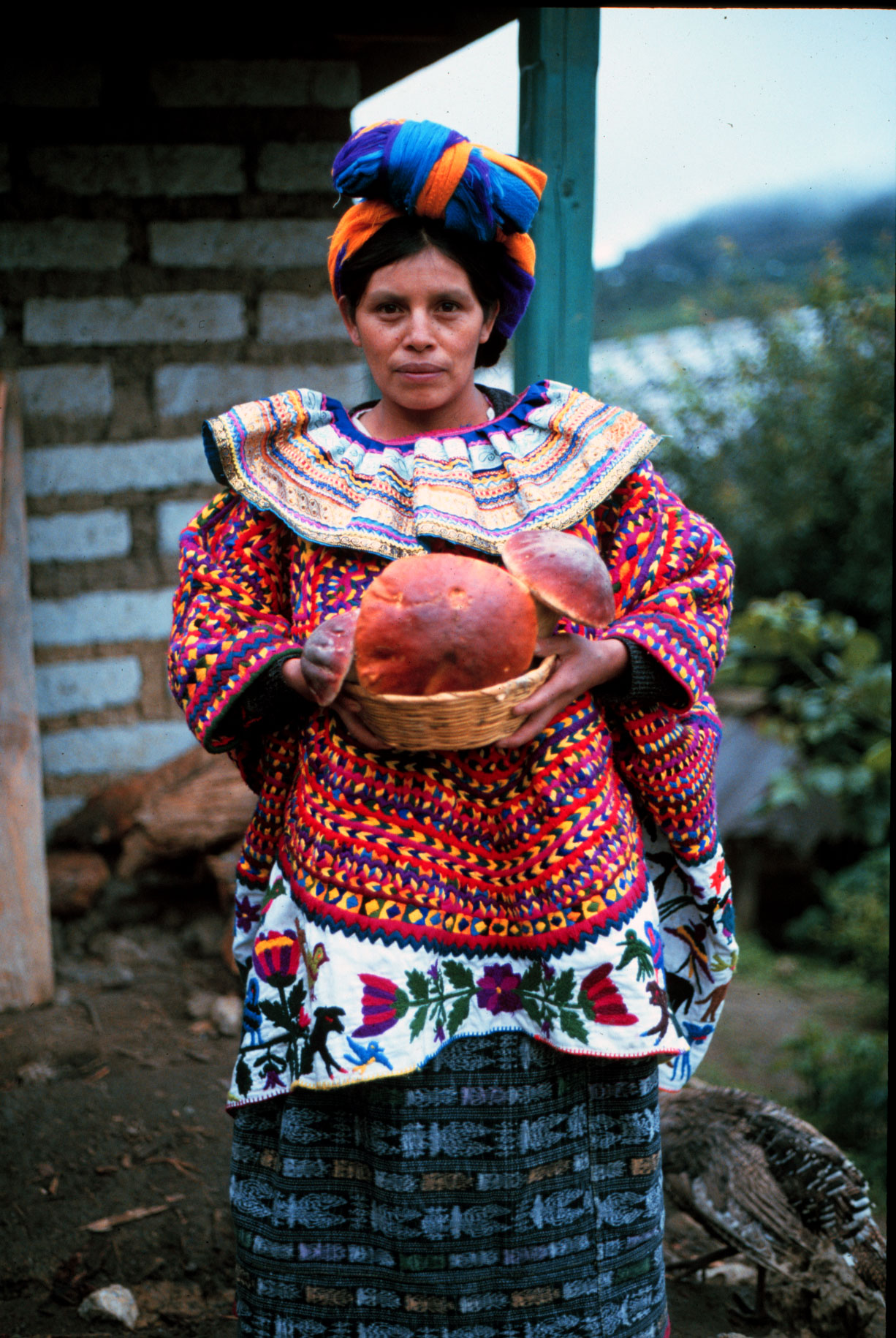
A woman displays large sporocarps of Boletus she collected near the Sierra de los Cuchumatanes, San Marcos

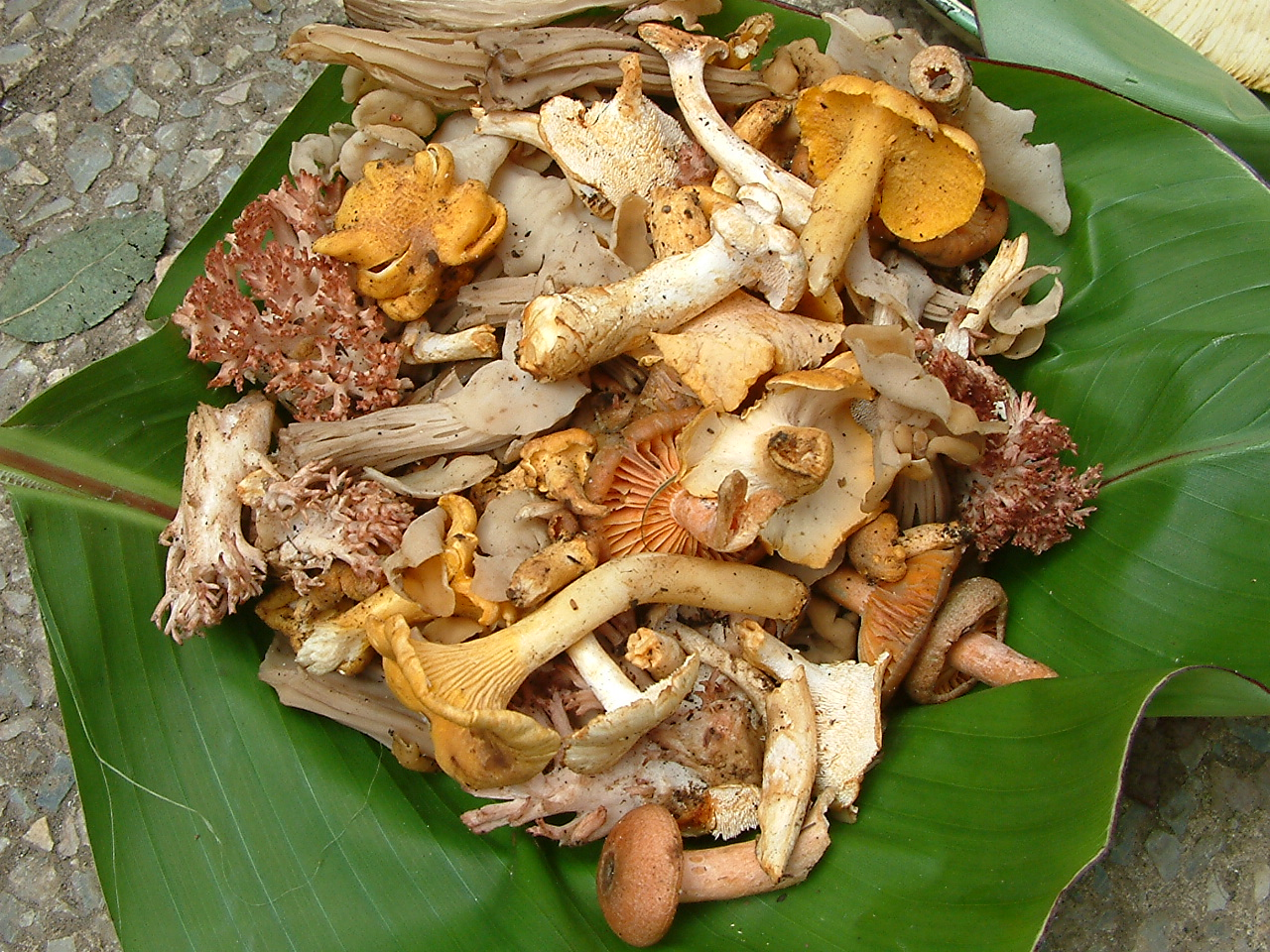
A 'medida' of mixed edible mushrooms on sale in the San Juan Sacatepéquez market

Indeed, the deep mycophily of Guatemalan indigenous people is apparent. Ethnomycological surveys conducted in the highlands, mainly through visits to local markets and interviews with vendors, revealed that some 130 species were identified as edible species, most of which actually sold in markets or along roadsides. Species of edible mushrooms belonging to different genera (e.g., Amanita, Lactarius, Helvella) are often offered mixed together, and sold in form of 'medida', i.e. a fixed amount, which equals the content of a small basket. However, the more popular and valuable species are usually sold separately. Lactarius deliciosus and L. indigo – known as 'Shara' (or 'Xara') 'amarilla' and 'Shara' (or 'Xara') 'azul', respectively, or 'Cabeza de Xara' in local Spanish (Sharas, also known as 'urracas', are birds, variously coloured, living in different parts of the country) – Amanita caesarea complex (hongo de San Juan), and Cantharellus cibarius (anacate), are among the most appreciated edible mushrooms among Guatemalan Maya people. Daldinia fissa is recorded as a common edible ascomycete from the municipality of Tecpán, Department of Chimaltenango. The mushroom is named as "tzan tz'i" in Kaqchikel dialect, that means "dog nose " or "chucho nose" because of ascostroma shape. Many, but by no means all, edible species are identified through common vernacular names that have been sometimes recorded in several Maya languages. Generally, mushrooms are gathered and sold by women, often in family groups spanning three generations. Localities with more traditional knowledge, based on the number of species are used, were Tecpán (Chimaltenango) with 31 species, followed by San Juan Comalapa (Chimaltenango)and Totonicapán city (Totonicapán), with 22 species each. The collection of wild edible fungi is done throughout the year and the main forms used for marketing were the "medida", "unidad", "Libra" and "manojo", being subject to their species or group of species in question use. The use of macrofungi in Guatemala other than for human consumption is limited to a few instances, such as for wound healing and for preventing infections (spores and dried mycelia of Calvatia lilacina and C. cyathiformis), cicatrizing substances to treat burns in children (sporocarps of Geastrum and Lycoperdon), to heal and disinfect wounds and to treat bee stings (dried specimens of Lycoperdon marginatum).

== IWEMM-7 in Guatemala ==
Guatemala hosted the 7th International Workshop on Edible Ectomycorrhizal Mushrooms (IWEMM-7). Held in the colonial city of Antigua, from July 29 to August 3, 2013, the congress convened researchers from worldwide institutions to discuss the most recent information about diversity, cultivation and production of wild edible mycorrhizal mushrooms. Several talks also dealt with the current status of knowledge on macrofungi in Guatemala and their traditional use.
