= Biodiversity of Guatemala =

Coordinates: 14°38′10″N 90°30′1″W

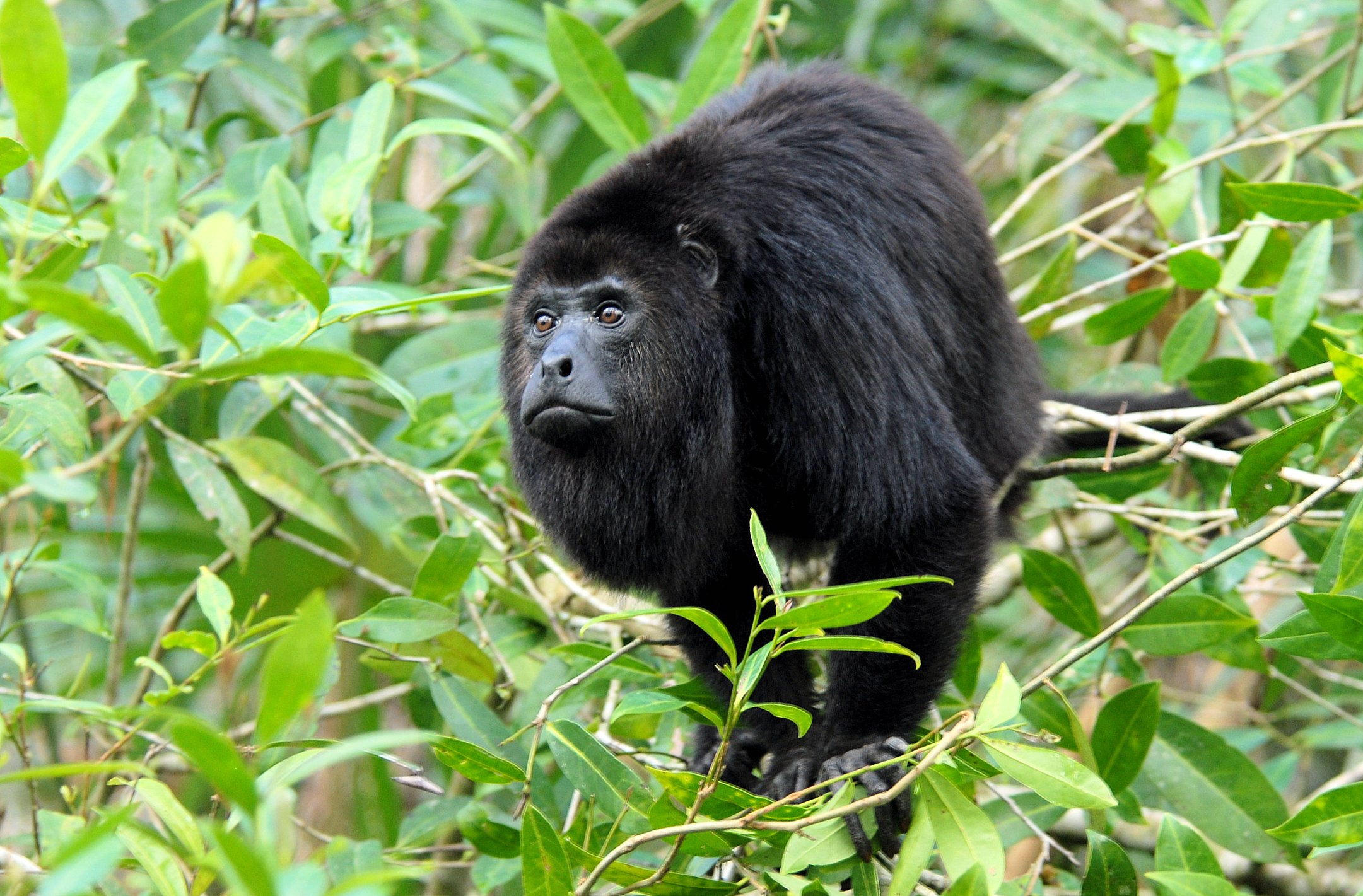
Guatemalan black howler

Guatemala has 14 ecoregions ranging from mangrove forest (4 species), in both ocean littorals, dry forests and scrublands in the eastern highlands, subtropical and tropical rain forests, wetlands, cloud forests in the Verapaz region, mixed forests and pine forests in the highlands. The country is the fifth biodiversity hotspot in the world according to ParksWatch and the IUCN. Population growth and deforestation are causing habitat loss.

Over one third of Guatemala (36.3% or about 39,380 km^{2}) is forested (2005). About half of the forests (49.7% or roughly 19,570 km^{2}) is classified as primary forest which is considered the most biodiverse forest type. Tree species include 17 conifers (pines, cypress, including the endemic Abies guatemalensis), the most in any tropical region of the world.

== Deforestation ==
The deforestation rate is 1.7%, a big threat. Funding for protected areas, PA's, is insufficient and hard to keep. A new method called Payments for environmental services, PES, is reliable and cost friendly. In the future, PES can also provide protected areas with more funding so they can preserve the biodiversity of these forests better. The goal of PES is to provide better water services and cleaner water to save these forests. Two reasons biodiversity PES is such a desirable new method are that it creates a new way of financing, and it can be sustainable based on the agreement of service users and providers.

Deforestation has affected biodiversity for the worse. Guatemala is an economically poor country with few resources to foster biodiversity. There is little it can do to fix any problems that deforestation may cause. With the increase in the need for schools, agricultural land, and businesses in Guatemala due to the desperate need for financial support and stability, deforestation seems inevitable, and there is little that the country can do to help sustain the biodiversity in the country.

== Soil loss ==
Changing land use has caused poor soil quality. With land use changing from forests to agriculture and industry, the soil has lost its richness and the degradation of the soil is increasing especially in the land that is used in agriculture. Without changes made to protect the forests, the soil will continue to be negatively impacted, thus impacting how well plants will grow and what type of plants will grow. As changes in the soil continue, plants will no longer be able to thrive in their homeland, which will decrease the overall biodiversity in Guatemala. If no changes are made, the rich biodiversity of the country will soon fade away.

== Wetlands ==
Guatemala has seven wetlands of international importance that were included in the Ramsar List.

- Parque Nacional Laguna del Tigre 337,899 hectares in Petén within the Maya Biosphere Reserve, Central America's largest freshwater wetland and the largest national park Guatemala
- Refugio de Vida Silvestre Bocas del Polochic, 21,227 hectares in Izabal
- Eco-región Lachuá, 53,523 hectares in Alta Verapaz
- Manchón-Guamuchal, 13,500 hectares on the Pacific coast across San Marcos and Retalhuleu
- Punta de Manabique, 132,900-hectare on the Caribbean coast of Izabal
- Parque Nacional Yaxhá-Nakum-Naranjo covering 37,160 hectares in Petén
- Reserva de Usos Múltiples Río Sarstún

== Fauna ==
Guatemala has some 8,061 known species of amphibians, birds, mammals, fish, reptiles and invertebrates according to figures from the World Conservation Monitoring Centre. Of these, 6.7% are endemic, meaning they exist in no other country, and 8.1% are threatened species. It is also home to at least 8681 species of vascular plants, of which 13.5% are endemic. 5.4% of the country is protected under IUCN categories I-V.

== Protected areas ==
With a total of 123 protected areas and more than 29% of the territory declared a protected area, Guatemala has the largest percentage of protected areas in Central America. Tikal National Park, which was created in 1955, was the first mixed UNESCO World Heritage Site in the world.

The amount of protected territories in Guatemala helps flourish biodiversity, but based on an article published in 2022, narcotics and drug-trafficking are having a major impact on deforestation. Due to drug trafficking and producing live stock for money laundering, there have been many habitat losses in Central America. The study concluded in this source is to show if deforestation is happening in these protected areas due to vegetation loss from drug-trafficking. The data collected is in the arrangement of EVI, enhanced vegetation index. The study was conducted in Laguna del Tigre National Park from 2002 to 2020. The results showed that EVI trends were reduced and had a loss of vegetation. This issue can be called "narco-deforestation". Although narcotics are not the main reason for deforestation, they definitely play a major part of this issue and need to be resolved.

== Coffee ==
Another issue in Guatemala is coffee production. A dip in coffee production from 2000 to 2004 caused decisions on land use and services. There was a 35% loss of area while coffee was not being produced. This caused major issues for biodiversity such as habitat loss and loss of native trees. This not only hurts the biodiversity but also the economy in general.

== Biodiversity planning and support ==
A National Biodiversity and Action Plan was developed in 1998 to help protect the biodiversity in the nation in a more political and standardized way. However, its success has been subpar. Due to the problems mentioned above, an increasing population, and simply the need for money and financial stability in Guatemala have dwindled the plan's impact. Those in the country are hesitant to accept the plan simply due to the country's need for money. This fact alone has made it very difficult for environmentalists and policymakers to preserve the great biodiversity that the nation has.
