= Andrea Joyce Stone =

North-American Mayanist

Andrea Joyce Stone (January 29, 1949 - February 18, 2014) was a North-American Mayanist. She studied Maya art at the University of Texas at Austin under the guidance of Linda Schele and, since 1984, taught at the University of Wisconsin–Milwaukee as a Professor in art history. Her contributions to the scholarship of ancient Mesoamerica include the zoomorphs and cosmic monsters of Quirigua (also her doctoral thesis), the iconography of foreigners at Piedras Negras, issues of sacrifice and sexuality in Classic Maya art, and the underworld imagery of Maya cave painting, particularly at Naj Tunich.

Stone's photographic study of the cave art at Naj Tunich was published in 1991 (ISBN 029272652X). The book included 199 monochrome photos, 296 line drawings and 14 maps.

== Notable works ==
- (with Marc Zender) Reading Maya Art: A Hieroglyphic Guide to Maya Painting and Sculpture. Thames and Hudson, London 2011
- “Spirals, Ropes, and Feathers: the Iconography of Rubber Balls in Mesoamerican Art,” Ancient Mesoamerica (2002)
- “The Cleveland Plaque: Cloudy Places of the Maya Realm,” in Eighth Palenque Round Table, Pre-Columbian Art Research Institute, ed. Martha Macri and Jan McHargue (1996)
- Images from the Underworld: Naj Tunich and the Tradition of Maya Cave Painting. University of Texas Press, Austin 1991
- “Variety and Transformation in the Cosmic Monster Theme at Quirigua, Guatemala,” Fifth Palenque Round Table (1983)
