= Las Labradas (Sinaloa) =

Archaeological site in Mexico

Las Labradas is an archaeological site located on the coast of the municipality of San Ignacio, in southern Sinaloa, Mexico.

== Location ==
Thirty-three kilometers south of the Gulf of California coast is the mouth of Piaxtla River. There is a port called Piaxtla Bars. On one of the beaches of that port is a set of petroglyphs, some of which date back to the ninth and tenth centuries, called Las Labradas.

An investigation has been carried out on the petroglyphs of the region, which were mostly carried out on a cliff of volcanic rock, called La Ventana. It has been determined that some of the petroglyphs could date back thousands of years.

Due to the plastic quality of the glyphs, the site is considered one of the most important places of rock art in American continent. Various forms of plants, flowers, fish, humans and zoomorphic figures are strangely stylized.

== Gallery ==
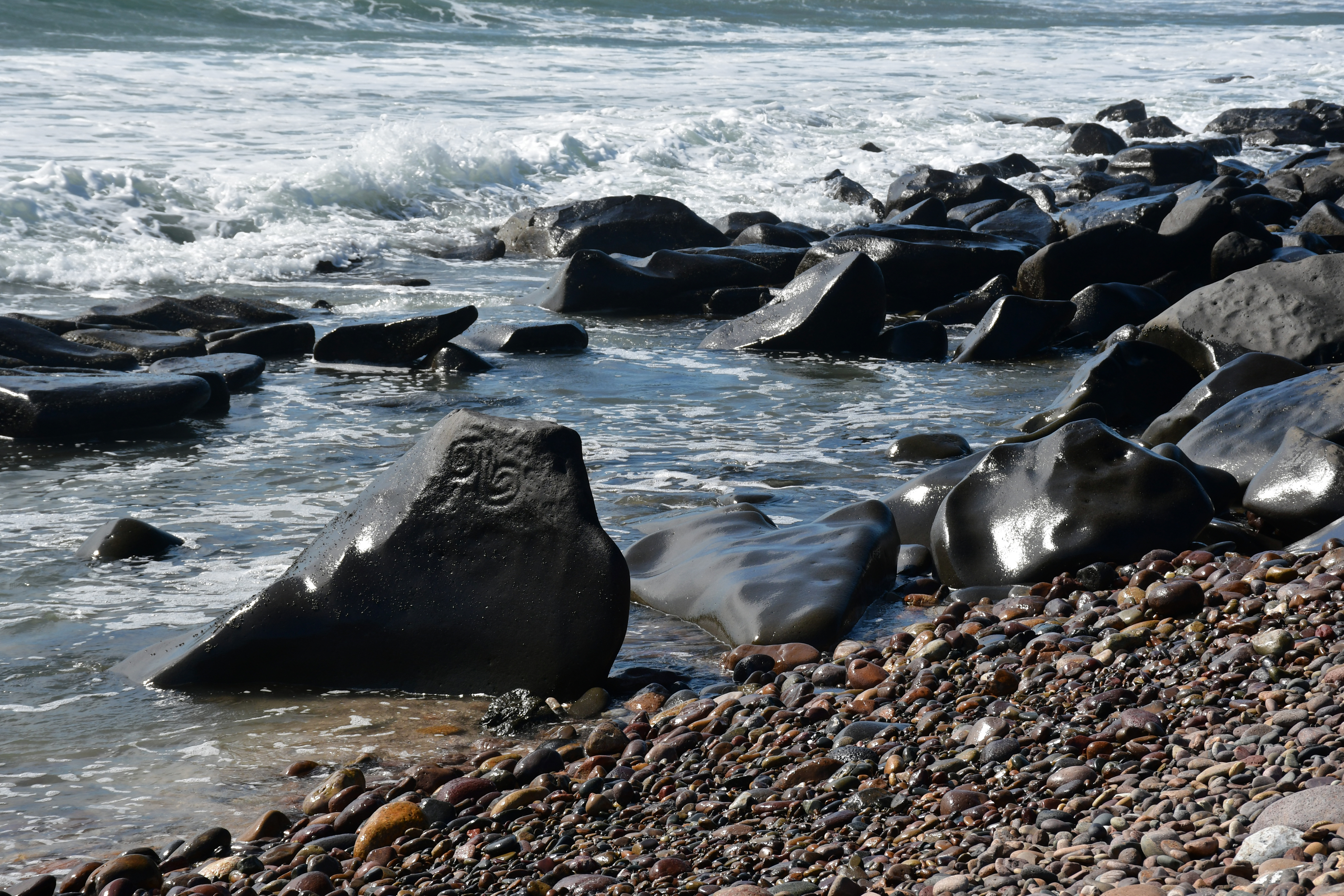
Petroglyphs of the archaeological site of Las Labradas, situated on the coast of the municipality of San Ignacio (Mexican state of Sinaloa)

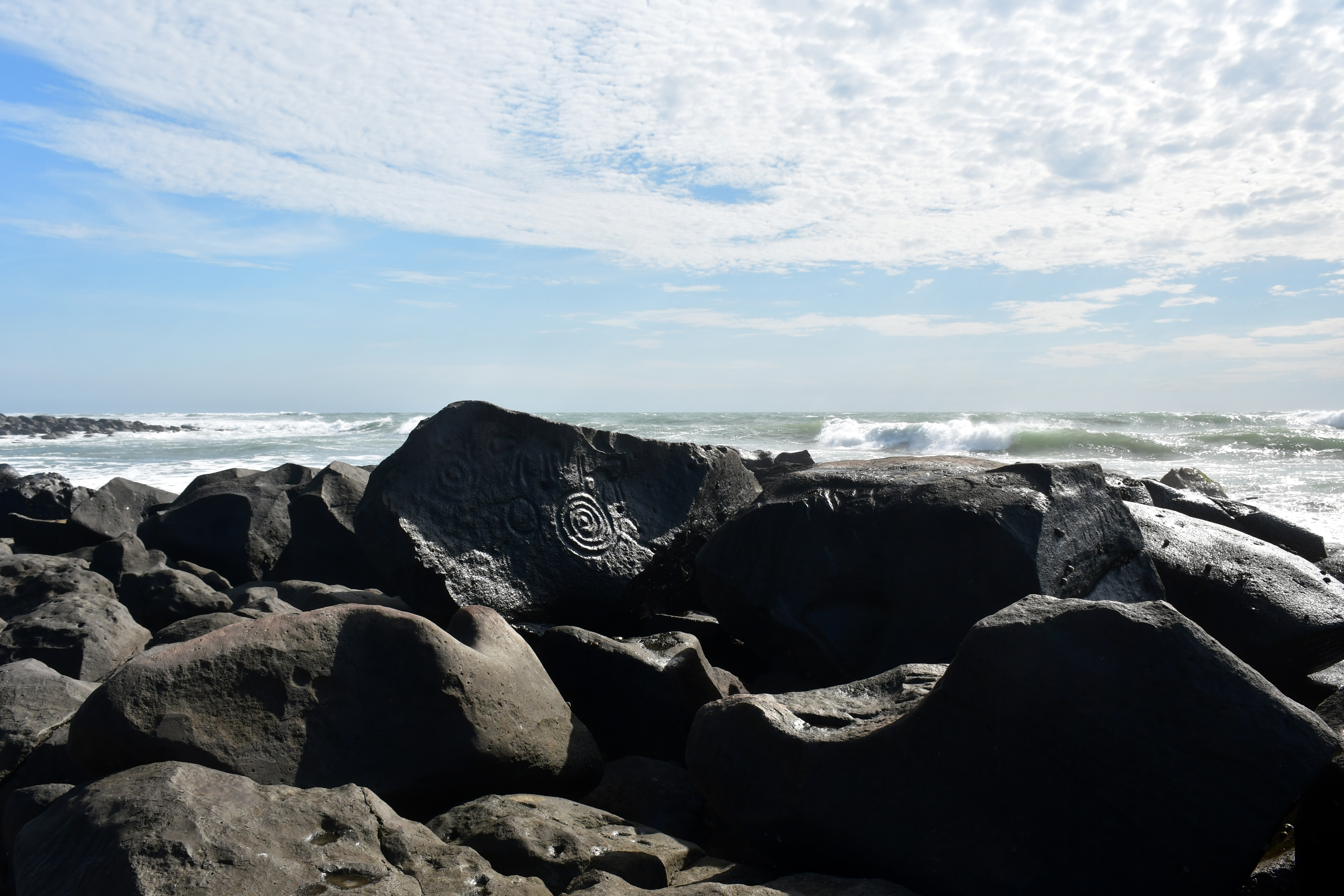
Petroglyphs of the archaeological site of Las Labradas, situated on the coast of the municipality of San Ignacio (Mexican state of Sinaloa)

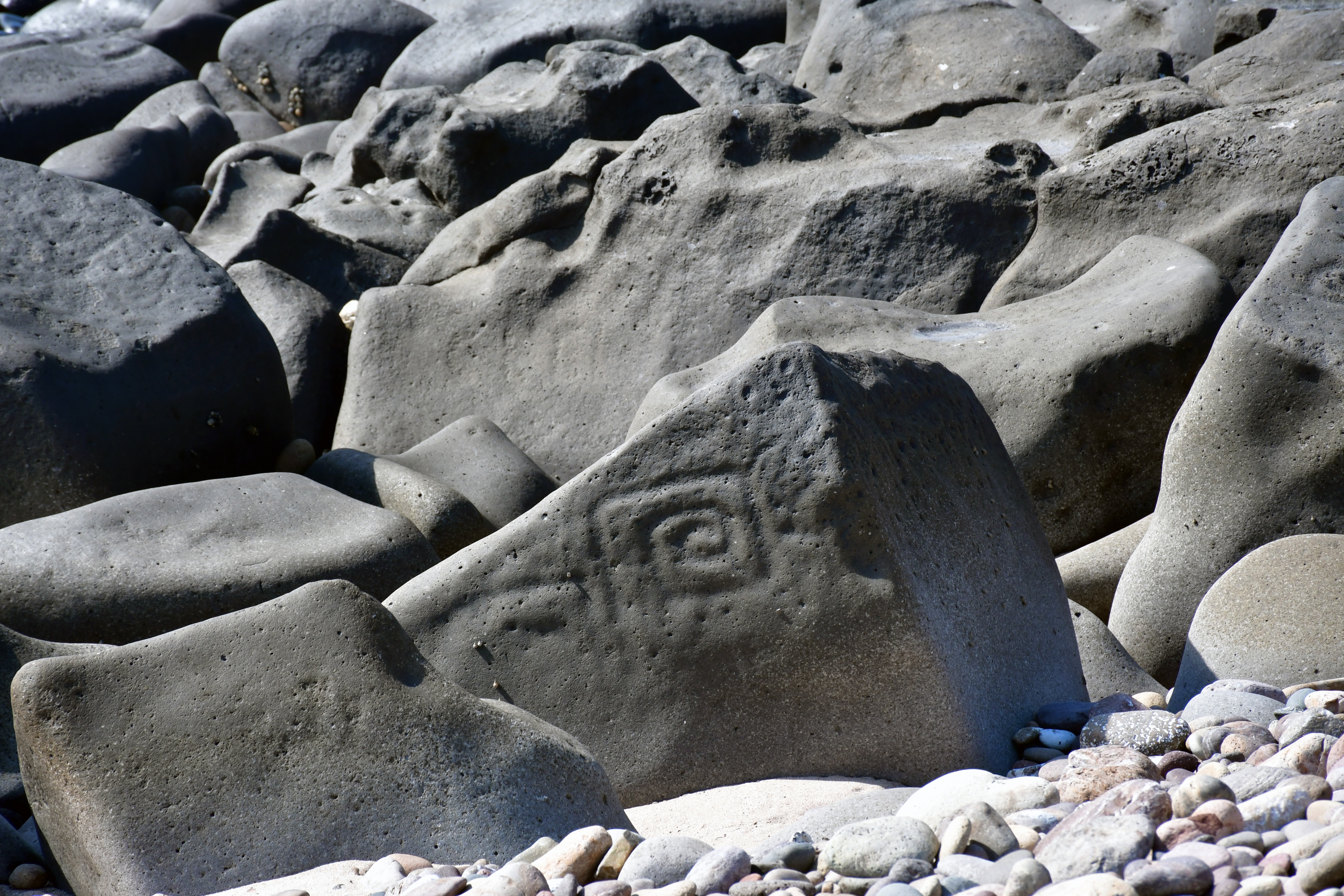
Petroglyphs of the archaeological site of Las Labradas, situated on the coast of the municipality of San Ignacio (Mexican state of Sinaloa)

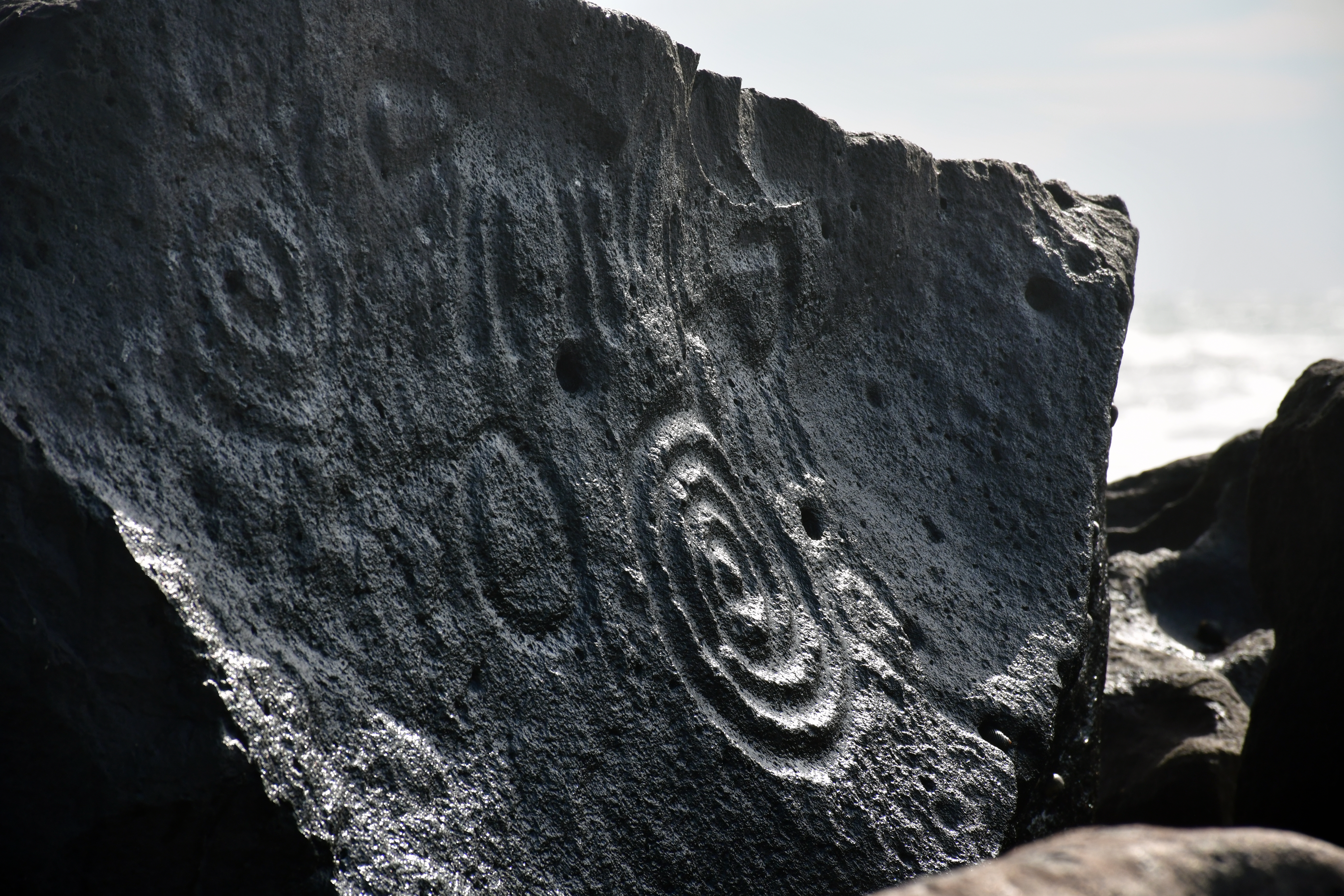
Petroglyphs of the archaeological site of Las Labradas, situated on the coast of the municipality of San Ignacio (Mexican state of Sinaloa)

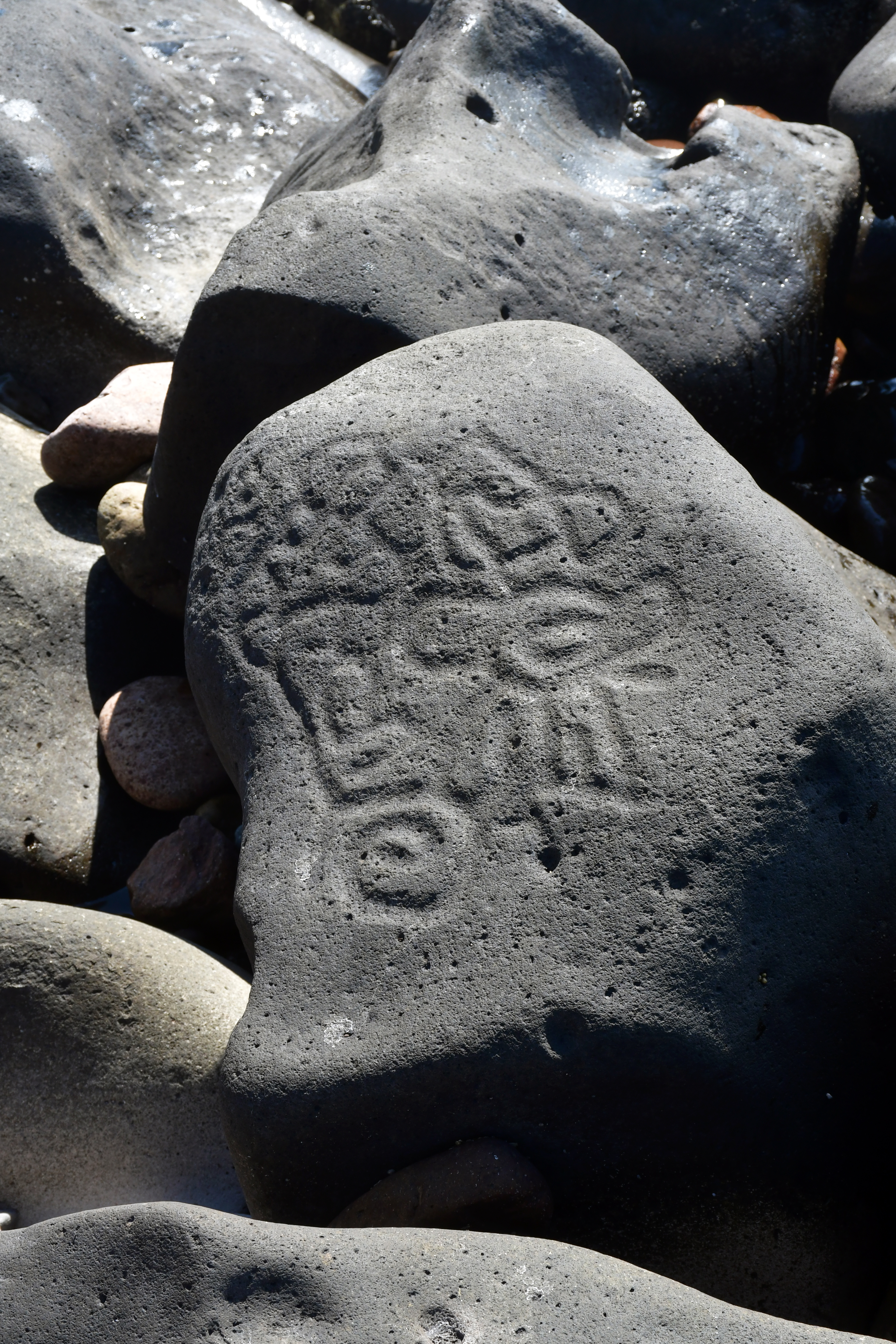
Petroglyphs of the archaeological site of Las Labradas, situated on the coast of the municipality of San Ignacio (Mexican state of Sinaloa)
