= List of World Heritage Sites in Haiti =

Location of World Heritage Sites in Haiti

The United Nations Educational, Scientific and Cultural Organization (UNESCO) World Heritage Sites are places of importance to cultural or natural heritage as described in the UNESCO World Heritage Convention, established in 1972. Cultural heritage consists of monuments (such as architectural works, monumental sculptures, or inscriptions), groups of buildings, and sites (including archaeological sites). Natural features (consisting of physical and biological formations), geological and physiographical formations (including habitats of threatened species of animals and plants), and natural sites which are important from the point of view of science, conservation, or natural beauty, are defined as natural heritage. Haiti accepted the convention on January 18, 1980, making its historical sites eligible for inclusion on the list. As of 2023, Haiti has only one World Heritage Site, National History Park – Citadel, Sans Souci, Ramiers, which was inscribed in 1982.

== World Heritage Sites ==
UNESCO lists sites under ten criteria; each entry must meet at least one of the criteria. Criteria i through vi are cultural, and vii through x are natural.

World Heritage Sites
Site	Image	Location (department)	Year listed	UNESCO data	Description
National History Park – Citadel, Sans Souci, Ramiers		Nord Department	1982	180; iv, vi (cultural)	These Haitian monuments date from the beginning of the 19th century, when Haiti proclaimed its independence. The Palace of Sans Souci, the buildings at Ramiers and, in particular, the Citadel serve as universal symbols of liberty, being the first monuments to be constructed by black slaves who had gained their freedom.

== Tentative List ==
In addition to sites inscribed on the World Heritage List, member states can maintain a list of tentative sites that they may consider for nomination. Nominations for the World Heritage List are only accepted if the site was previously listed on the tentative list. As of 2025, Haiti has listed two properties on its tentative list.

Tentative sites
Site	Image	Location (department)	Year listed	UNESCO criteria	Description
Historic Center of Jacmel		Sud-Est Department	2004	ii, iv (cultural)	
National Historic Park of Matheux - Coffee, Slavery, and Freedom Trail		Artibonite Department, Ouest Department	2024	ii, iv, v, vi (cultural)	
