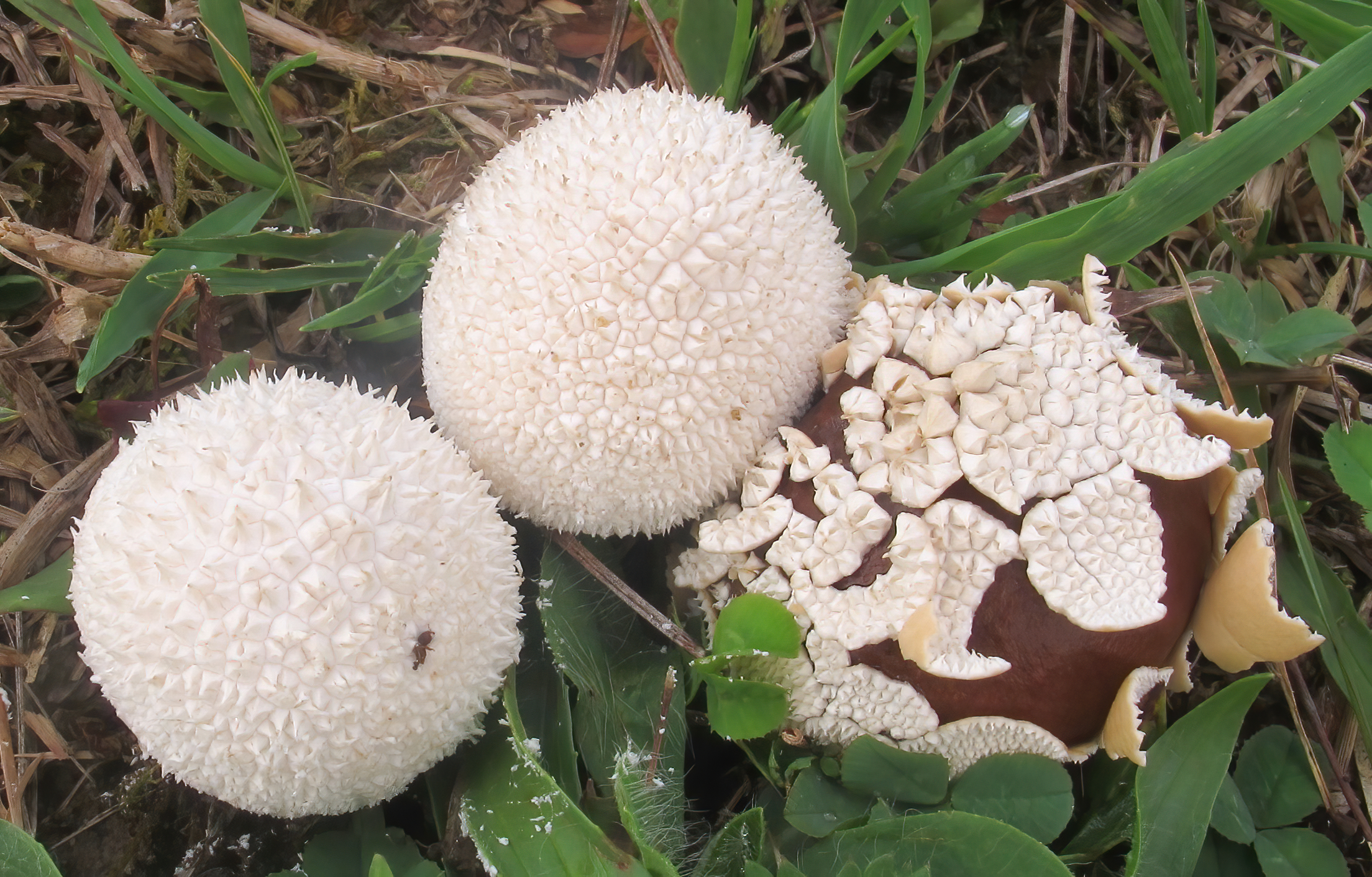

Scientific classification
- Kingdom: Fungi
- Division: Basidiomycota
- Class: Agaricomycetes
- Order: Agaricales
- Family: Lycoperdaceae
- Genus: Lycoperdon
- Species: L. marginatum

Binomial name
- Lycoperdon marginatum Vittad. (1839)

= Lycoperdon marginatum =

Species of fungus

Lycoperdon marginatum
- Mycological characteristics
- Glebal hymenium
- No distinct cap
- Hymenium attachment is irregular or not applicable
- Lacks a stipe
- Spore print is white to olive
- Edibility is edible or inedible

Lycoperdon marginatum, commonly known as the peeling puffball, is a type of puffball mushroom in the genus Lycoperdon. It is characterized by the way that the spiny outer layer peels off in sheets. A common species, it is found in Europe and North America, where it grows on the ground.

== Taxonomy ==
The species was first described scientifically in 1839 by Vittadini. Molecular analysis places it the species in the subgenus Lycoperdon of the genus Lycoperdon, along with L. perlatum and L. norvegicum.

It is commonly known as the peeling puffball.

== Description ==
The fruit bodies of Lycoperdon marginatum are roughly spherical when young, becoming flattened and more pear-shaped in maturity, and have dimensions of 1–5 cm (0.4–2.0 in) wide. A short, tapering stalk holds the fruit body. Initially white, the surface of the peridium (spore case) is densely covered with short spines; the spines eventually fall off in irregular sheets, exposing the smooth, brown underlying surface. Mature fruit bodies form a small opening at the top through which spores are released.

The internal spore-bearing tissue, the gleba, is initially white and firm, but becomes greenish-brown and then greyish-brown and powdery at the mushroom matures. The spores are spherical, covered with minute warts, and measure 3.5–4.5 μm. It has yellowish-brown capillitium threads that have a few pores or septa, and measure 6–7 μm wide.

Lycoperdon echinatum is similar is appearance, but its spines do not break off in sheets. The exoperidium of L. rimulatum sometimes peels off in sheets, but it does not have spines on its surface.

== Habitat and distribution ==
The puffball is saprobic, and grows on the ground singly, scattered, or in groups. A fairly common species, it is often found on sandy soil, in nutrient-poor locations, or in oak-pine woods, where it fruits between June and December. It is found in Australia, Europe and North & South America.

== Uses ==
There have been conflicting reports regarding the puffball's edibility, with some listing it as safe to eat when young (but insubstantial) and others describing it as poisonous. The species is used in Mexico to produce auditory hallucinations, although chemical analysis of fruit bodies has not revealed the presence of any substances that would cause this effect.

== In culture ==
The puffball was featured on a postage stamp from the Ascension Islands in 1983.
