= Visis Cabá =

Biosphere reserve in Guatemala

Visis Cabá biosphere reserve
- Interactive map of Visis Cabá biosphere reserve
- Location: El Quiché, Guatemala
- Coordinates: 15.574°N 90.996°W
- Area: 450 km^{2} (170 sq mi)
- Operator: CONAP

The Visis Cabá biosphere reserve is a 450 km^{2} (170 mi^{2}) protected area in the department of El Quiché. It is also known as Biósfera Ixil, and is located in the North of the municipality of Chajul, on the communal lands of the Ixil communities.

The creation of the Visis Cabá biosphere reserve has gone through a long and complex process of negotiations between the Ixil communities, government institutions, and the communities of civil-war refugees (CPR) living in that area.
