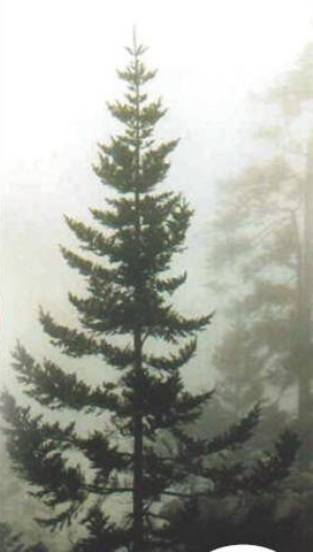
- Abies guatemalensis in the San Miguel Los Altos Reserve, Totonicapán, Guatemala

Conservation status
- Endangered (IUCN 3.1)
- CITES Appendix I

Scientific classification
- Kingdom: Plantae
- Clade: Embryophytes
- Clade: Tracheophytes
- Clade: Spermatophytes
- Clade: Gymnospermae
- Division: Pinophyta
- Class: Pinopsida
- Order: Pinales
- Family: Pinaceae
- Genus: Abies
- Species: A. guatemalensis

Binomial name
- Abies guatemalensis Rehder

= Abies guatemalensis =

Guatemalan fir

Species of conifer

Abies guatemalensis, the Guatemalan fir or pinabete, is an evergreen tree native to Central America and is the southernmost member of the genus Abies being spread to the south lower than 14° N. Its range is from southern (less from western and central) Mexico in the north to Honduras and El Salvador in the south. It is a warm-loving and moisture-loving tree of the tropical mountain coniferous and mixed cloud forests of these countries. The Guatemalan fir is an almost completely non-frost-resistant tree. Due to logging and loss of habitat, the tree is considered threatened and is protected in CITES Appendix I.

== Description ==
A. guatemalensis is a conical tree growing 20 to 35 meters tall and 60 to 90 cm in girth. The branches grow largely horizontally. The bark is a blackish-brown and is divided into plates. The branchlets are reddish-brown to deep blackish-red and pubescent. The buds are globular-ovoid, resinous, and roughly 5 mm in length. The leaves are somewhat comb-like or nearly pectinate in arrangement. They are unequal and deep green above and waxy in texture underneath. They measure 1.5 to 5.5 cm long by 1.2 to 2 mm wide. Stomata are usually absent above, but appear in 8 to 10 lines below. They contain two marginal resin canals and the apex of the leaf is notched and emarginate. The female cones are oblong-cylindric and the apex is pointed to somewhat flattened. They are yellowish-brown in colour with a violet bloom and measure 8 to 11.5 cm long by 4 to 4.5 cm wide. The scales are oblong, or broader than long. The bracts are hidden, about one half the height of the scale and are cuneate-obovoid in shape. The seeds are a light brown nut to 9 mm in length with a wing to 1.5 cm long.

== Taxonomy ==
There are two recognised varieties of A. guatemalensis, namely:

- A. g. var. guatemalensis, which is the type variety and is present over the majority of the range. It is present in Guatemala, El Salvador, Honduras and the Mexican states of Chiapas, Colima, Guerrero, Oaxaca and Tamaulipas.
- A. g. var. jaliscana is present only in the northern part of the distribution, namely in the Mexican states of Jalisco, Michoacán, Nayarit and possibly Sinaloa.

== Ecology ==
A. guatemalensis is listed as endangered by the IUCN due to timber exploitation and loss of habitat. It characteristically grows in deep fertile soils, which are desirable for agriculture by local inhabitants (especially for coffea plantations). It was reported as being a common tree up until the 1940s. Large populations may still remain in Honduras, but data is currently deficient. Some evidence suggests that the areas of each remaining stands in Guatemala (except for the forest of Los Altos de San Miguel Totonicapán) are usually no larger than 3 square kilometers. Furthermore, the cone crops are irregular and germination is typically poor. Among the remaining populations, the forest of Los Altos de San Miguel Totonicapán in Guatemala is said to harbour the largest and best-conserved stands by area of 52,000-acres (26,060 hectares), though these are also threatened by illegal logging. As a result of its status, it has become illegal to harvest in some countries where it is native and it is listed in CITES Appendix I, which prohibits commercial international trade in wild-sourced specimens (including parts and derivatives). The Central American And Mexico Coniferous Resources Cooperative (CAMCORE) has also begun programmes to protect the tree in the wild.

In Mexico, A. guatemalensis is found on the Pacific slopes of the Sierra Madre del Sur and the southern Sierra Madre Occidental, in the states of Chiapas, Oaxaca, Guerrero, Michoacan, Colima, Jalisco, Nayarit, and Zacatecas. Typical habitat is on volcanic soils between 1800 and 3700 meters elevation, in areas of cool, moist climate with oceanic influence.
