= Sierra del Lacandón =

National park in El Petén, Guatemala

- Location within Guatemala Location within Mexico

Highest point
- Elevation: 636 m (2,087 ft)
- Coordinates: 17°11′42.31″N 91°5′9.97″W

Geography
- Countries: Guatemala and Mexico
- States: El Petén and Chiapas

Geology
- Rock age: Cretaceous
- Rock type: Karstic

The Sierra del Lacandón is a low karstic mountain range in Guatemala and Mexico. It is situated in the north-west of the department of El Petén and the south-east of Chiapas. Its highest points are located near the Mexican border at coordinates 17.244195°N 91.202145°W and 17.195087°N 91.086102°W The range consists of southeast to northwest trending ridges of folded Cretaceous limestone and dolomite hills rising above the lowlands of the Petén Basin.

== Sierra del Lacandón National Park ==
Sierra del Lacandón
- IUCN category II (national park)
- Interactive map of Sierra del Lacandón
- Location: El Petén, Guatemala
- Area: 2,028.65 km^{2} (783.27 sq mi)
- Created: 1990
- Established: Decreto 5–90
- Operator: CONAP; Fundación Defensores de la Naturaleza
- Website: Sierra del Lacandón National Park

The Sierra del Lacandón National Park is a 501,290.332 acres (202,865.000 ha) national park established in 1990. It is part of the Maya Biosphere Reserve and is unique for its biodiversity. It is also considered of great importance for the Mesoamerican Biological Corridor as it connects the protected areas of northern Guatemala with those of southern Mexico, like the Montes Azules Biosphere Reserve in Chiapas.

Several ancient Maya archaeological sites are located within the park boundaries. These include Piedras Negras, El Porvenir, Macabilero, La Pasadita, El Hormiguero, and El Ceibo.

== See also ==
- Geography of Guatemala
