= La Duquesa Sugar Mill =

- Interactive map of La Duquesa Sugar Mill

La Duquesa Sugar Mill, founded in 1882 by American machinist Alejandro Bass and F. Von Krosigh, is located in the Distrito Nacional (National District) of the Dominican Republic.

This site was added to the UNESCO World Heritage Tentative List on April 5, 2002 in the Cultural category. Authorities of the Dominican Republic declared in 2004 that the request had been approved by the UNESCO and would be made official in 2005.

Duquesa is also the site of one of the world's largest landfill in the world.
