= Naj Tunich =

Pre-Columbian archaeological site in Guatemala

Naj Tunich Cave
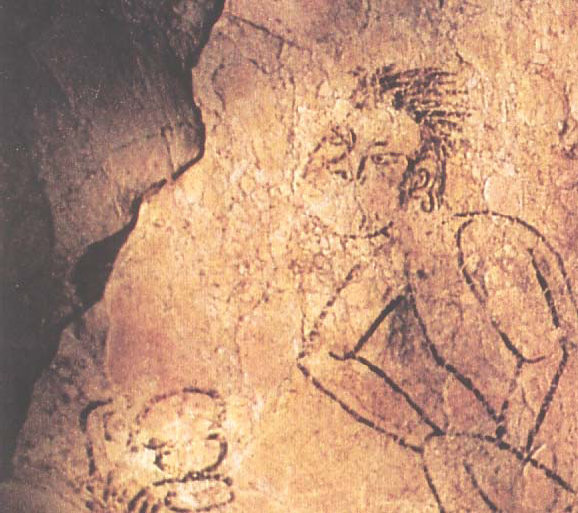
- A wall drawing of a man in rare 3/4 profile, performing ritual genital bloodletting
- Interactive map of Naj Tunich Cave
- Location: Poptún, Guatemala
- Discovery: 1979
- Geology: Karst
- Website: https://www.najtunich.gt/

Naj Tunich (Mopan Maya: [nah tunit͡ʃ] "stone house, cave") is a series of pre-Columbian era natural caves outside the village of La Compuerta, roughly 35 km east of Poptún in Guatemala. The site was a Maya ritual pilgrimage site during the Classic period. Artifacts show that the cave was accessed primarily during the Early Classic period. Deposits become rarer during the Late Classic period. The fame of the cave, however, rests on its long Late Classic (c. AD 600 – c. 900) hieroglyphic texts as well as on a considerable number painted scenes and figures.

In 2012, the caves were added to the Tentative Lists as a potential UNESCO World Heritage Site. By that time, they were already a National Monument of Guatemala.

== Rediscovery ==
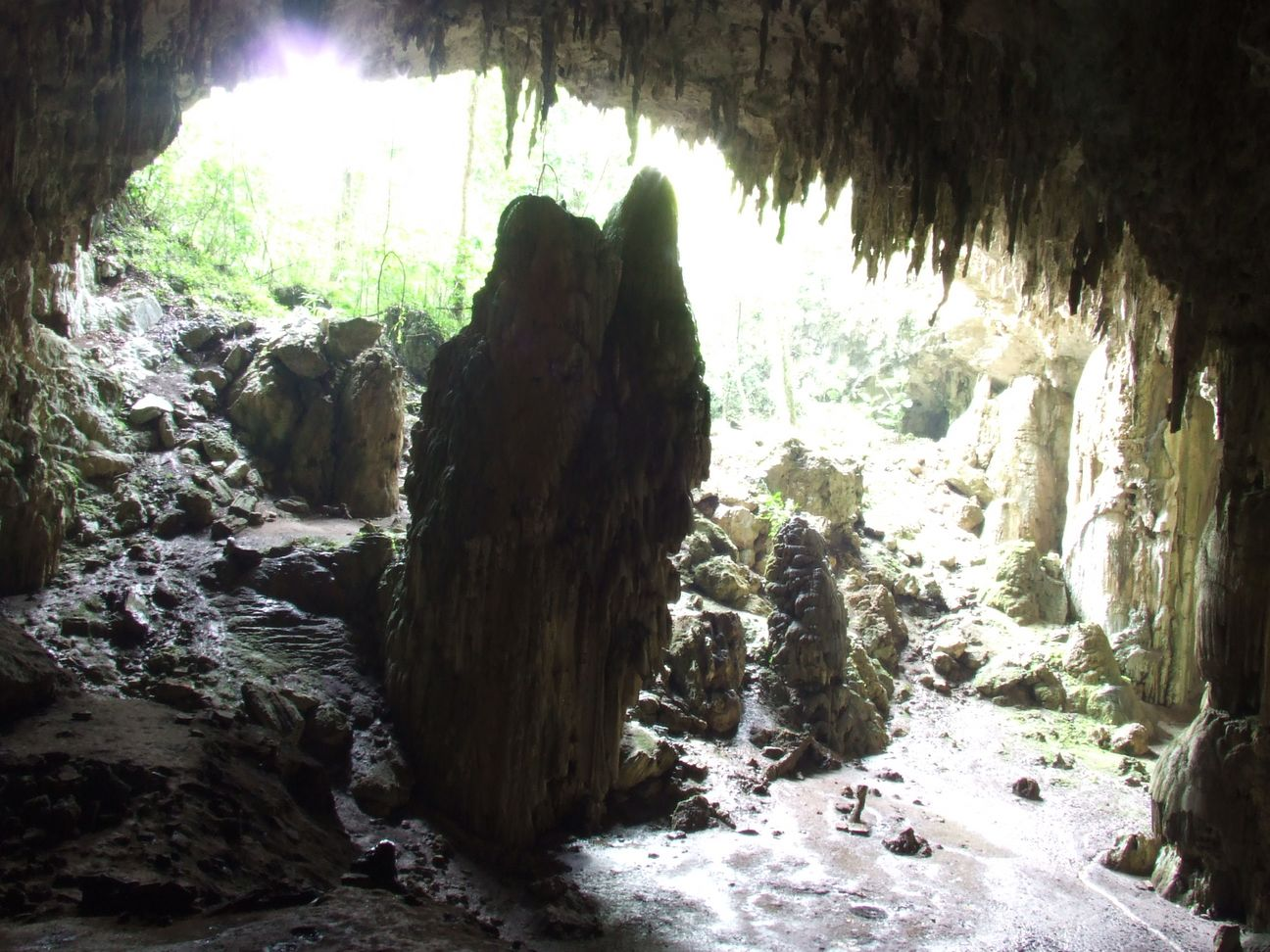
Entrance to Naj Tunich (2008)

According to the UNESCO summary, the caves were discovered by a Q'eqchi' Maya Native, a hunter named Bernabé Pop mid 1979 while hunting peccary with his dogs. Bernabe and his father Emilio explored the cave and revealed its existence to an American, Mike Devine, who lived in the area; Devine then guided some people into the site. Later, topographic surveys were completed by James Brady.

The first academic visitation to the site was made by Pierre Ventur in 1980. Archaeological exploration commenced in 1981. Explorers included teams from the Institute of Anthropology and History and, in 1981, from the National Geographic Society. It resulted in a map of the cave's passageways Naj Tunich has been thoroughly mapped and photographed in order to preserve as much of the paintings and hieroglyphs as possible.

A photographic study was completed in 1988 by Andrea Joyce Stone. Her work was published as Images from the Underworld: Naj Tunich and the Tradition of Maya Cave Painting by the University of Texas Press (ISBN 029272652X). The book included 199 monochrome photos, 296 line drawings and 14 maps.

Stone stated that the cave had been vandalized several times by 1986 and that more serious vandalism occurred in 1989. A news item stated that in 1989, unknown persons "scratched, scraped or smeared into oblivion more than 20 of the ... images and hieroglyphic texts". The caves were closed to the public but copies of murals were painted in a replica cave; tours of that cave are available from a tour company.

== Site description ==
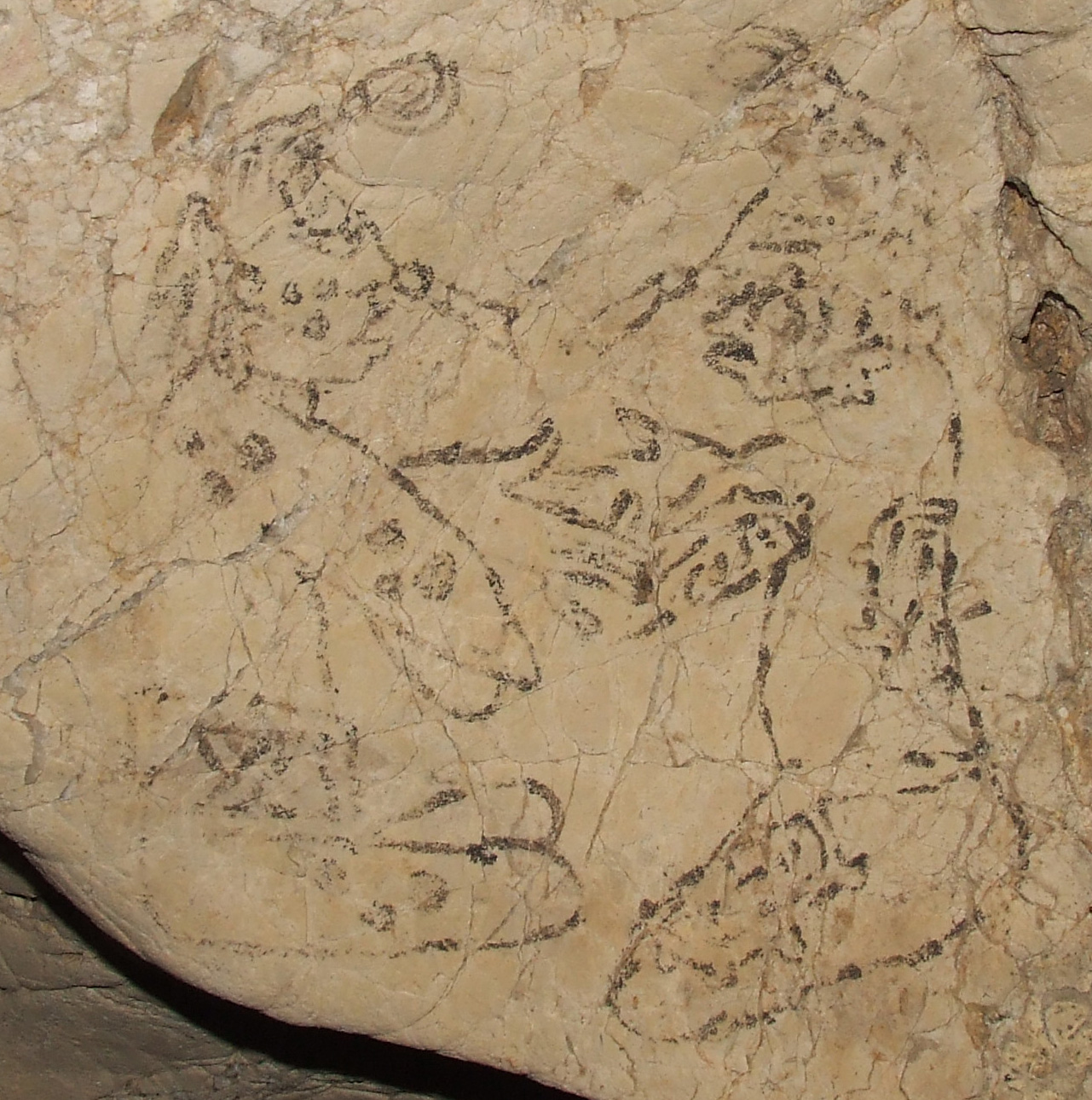
Art work at Naj Tunich (2012 photo)

The UNESCO web site provides details as to the contents of the site, including this paragraph:

This representation of pictorial art is unique in its kind in the Maya world, not only for quality but also quantity. Furthermore, the capricious formations of nature have made stalactites and stalagmites, creating a magical world within the multiple rooms and meandering branches of the cave. Among its visual representations are approximately 90 images among which anthropomorphic characters, animals, deities, musical instruments and hieroglyphic texts are represented.

The cave is located on a "sheer limestone cliff face more than 200m above" the surrounding valley, making access difficult. The cave mouth itself is located "at the end of a ravine." This accessway also includes two mounds which form a "gateway" to the entrance of the cave. Archaeologists note that while Naj Tunich cave was difficult to reach, the Maya altered the cave significantly through the use of architectural modifications. These modifications included the construction of steps, walls, and the infilling of the cave floor. Studies have shown that the materials required for these alterations were carefully chosen and carried from long distances.

Naj Tunich cave is described as having a north–south orientation and includes two chambers, Chamber 1 and Chamber 2. The entrance to Naj Tunich is large enough to allow for natural light to enter into Chamber 1. The length of the cave is reported as 19m and the widest portion measuring 2.5m. The width of the cave tunnels would have limited access to individual persons in some portions. The cave had also featured "crystalline" stalagmites and stalactites of a yellowish, transparent hue. But nearly all have been destroyed through either environmental or human causes.

Naj Tunich cave is also associated with many artifacts relating to possible ritual activity. Maya artifacts at Naj Tunich include offerings of ceramics, lithics, bowls, precious minerals, copal incense, and human sacrifices.

Chamber 1 includes wooden posts which are suspected to have created 2–3 smaller rooms within the chamber. An elaborate, 14 meter high balcony was also constructed in Chamber 1. This balcony is noted as including what would have been a shallow pool of water. This pool was altered by the Maya through damming. Chamber 1 also includes an altar or shrine area that includes a basin possibly associated with cosmological rituals. Both the balcony and shrine located in Chamber 1 were also likely used in water rituals which may have deepened associations between the caverns, water, power, and natural order.

Along with the features of Chamber 1, two other areas of Naj Tunich cave were associated with access and control of water. One of these is a natural pool of water "located 40 meters into the tunnel system." The Maya had built a "small earthen platform" to the north of the pool. The presence of a large artifact assemblage in the vicinity of the pool suggests that the area was heavily used.

The second section of Chamber 1 that was associated with water is the "Silent Well," located at the tunnel section furthest from the cave entrance. The well is described as having a diameter of five meters and a long, muddy shaft. Traces of ancient Maya foot prints have been found around the well. Small amounts of clay are said to have been extracted from the Silent Well by pilgrims as mementos. The Maya may have preferred the clay from the Silent Well because of its location deep within the cave.

Chamber 2 is noted as being the smaller of the two chambers. It is described as roughly circular and includes a natural window which could be covered in order to block sunlight. Unfortunately, much of the architectural alterations made to Chamber 2 have been destroyed by looters.

Archaeologists believe that Naj Tunich was associated with the Maya city of Uxbenká, as it is located 2.3 km south of the Stela Plaza. In fact, it is believed that the Stela Plaza construction coincides with alterations made within Naj Tunich cave. Archaeologists have also noted that individuals at the Stela Plaza in Uxbenká were capable of looking out to Naj Tunich and vice versa. Which may be evidence of the importance of the relationship between the two sites.

== Naj Tunich and sacred geography ==
Many studies have focused on Naj Tunich as being imbued with sacred, ritual power within Maya cosmology. Primarily, it has been interpreted as having what the Maya refer to as "suhuy". This word has been applied to things which are "unsullied by the human presence." For the Maya, deep cave systems such as Naj Tunich may have represented the most untouched earthly domains.

Naj Tunich is also unique in that it included cosmograms referred to as mesa which "defines the cosmic center and the four quarters" which originate from it. Often, these four quarters were marked with "sacred stones" which would be of a similar size and spherical. The center stone would represent the largest of the five stones. Archaeologists have explained that for the Maya, Naj Tunich may have represented the house of a divine being or entrance to the underworld, Xibalba.

Studies have shown that Naj Tunich also served as a pilgrimage site. Researchers have noted that Naj Tunich may have represented access to economic, political, and material power. As well as a magical source of fertility and "pure" or suhuy water. Hieroglyphs at Naj Tunich have recorded the names of Maya elite who are said to have visited the site. The sites associated with having visited Naj Tunich included "Caracol, Ixkun, Ixtutz, Calakmul, Dos Pilas, and possibly Xultun."

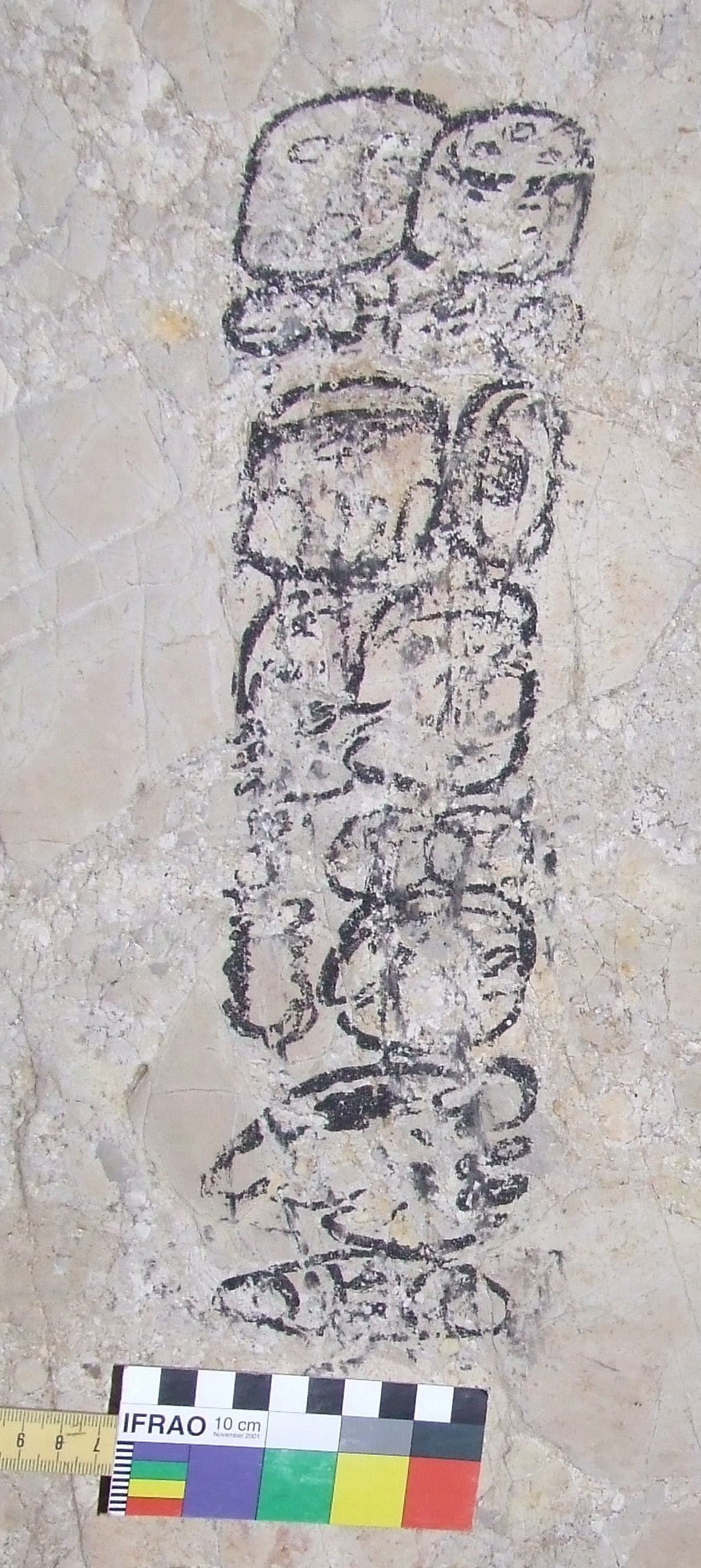
Art work at Naj Tunich (2012 photo)

== Cave art and writing ==
Naj Tunich also featured a great number of petroglyphs and paintings; as well as 500 hieroglyphs. Naj Tunich is one of five caves which have been discovered to have Maya hieroglyphs. Naj Tunich features the highest number of hieroglyphs of any Maya cave and the total number of hieroglyphs identified exceeds the number of all other Maya cave writing combined. Archaeologists consider the artistic style at Naj Tunich as more refined than that of other Maya caves.

The art of Naj Tunich cave varies greatly with subjects including mythological stories, deities, rituals, and performances. Naj Tunich is also one of twenty two Maya sites to include "explicit sexual imagery." These explicit depictions of male figures with erect genitalia may relate to all-male performances of sex and gender. As well as a representation of homosexual desire and relationships.

Multispectral imaging has been used to study pigments at Naj Tunich cave. These studies show that at least three different pigments were used to create the images within the cave. Multispectral imaging also showed that the images show signs of "over-painting, repainting or touching up" by the artists.

== Modern impact on the site ==
Since its rediscovery, Naj Tunich cave has been heavily impacted by looters. Looters have subsequently destroyed much of the architecture of the caves. The looters ejected "artifacts, rocks, and architecture" from the cave mouth, destroying parts of the cave. Conservation efforts led by the Uxbenká Cave Project (UCP) have assisted in salvage operations at Naj Tunich.

== Archaeological Settlement on Surface ==
In 2017, for the first time officially, the Archaeological Atlas of Guatemala in conjunction with students from the University Center of Petén of the University of San Carlos of Guatemala, conducted archaeological reconnaissance on the surface of the land within which the cave system containing the cave paintings is located. The survey concluded with the identification of several groups of pre-Hispanic architectural structures with a low degree of preservation.

The site appears to be a small ceremonial center within the polygon of the Archaeological Park, with the presence of mounds on the outside, within private estates. The findings include monuments such as stelae.

== Heritage Management and Revaluation of the Archaeological Heritage ==
Derived from the conservation conditions of the cave paintings of the Naj Tunich Caves, starting in 2017 the Naj Tunich Initiative was created, led by Dr. Rosa María Chan, who managed to develop a process of identification of main axes to design a medium-term program under sustainability standards. The objective of the Initiative was based on establishing the convergence of the experiences that have emerged in terms of the latest trends for the implementation of an integrated heritage and territorial management approach. The Initiative seeks to reconcile conservation and development efforts, emerging as a mechanism for integrated management of cultural and natural heritage focused on the conservation and management of the Naj Tunich Archaeological Park, the well-being of the local population and territorial development.

The Naj Tunich Initiative also developed the projects of Development of the database of rock paintings of the Naj Tunich Caves, the Project for the Protection of the Cave Paintings of the Naj Tunich Archaeological Park, which promoted the publication of a new ministerial agreement for the creation of the Archaeological Park, a cadastral study, survey of trails and illegal breaches and demarcation of the polygon of the park through the placement of monuments, signage and cairns. At the same time, the Community Governance Project was developed for the management of natural and cultural resources, through which the aim was to promote heritage and environmental education for the community development of the population associated with the site.

== Bibliography ==
- Stone Andrea J. 1995-Images from the Underworld Naj Tunich and the Tradition of Maya Cave Painting ISBN 978-0-292-75552-9
- Brady, James E. 1989 An Investigation of Maya Ritual Cave Use with Special Reference to Naj Tunich, Peten, Guatemala. Ph.D. dissertation, University of California, Los Angeles.
- Brady, James E. y Sandra Villagrán de Brady, 1991 -La arqueología de la cueva Naj Tunich: Patrones de utilización ritual. En II Simposio de Investigaciones Arqueológicas en Guatemala, 1988 (editado por J.P. Laporte, S. Villagrán, H. Escobedo, D. de González y J. Valdés), pp. 179–186. Museo Nacional de Arqueología y Etnología, Guatemala.
- Andrea Stone—Regional Variation in Maya Cave Art. Journal of Cave and Karst Studies 59(1): 33–42.
