= Sanate Sugar Mill =

Coordinates: 18.577°N 68.803°W

- Interactive map of Sanate Sugar Mill

The Sanate Sugar Mill (Spanish: Ingenio Azucarero De Sanate) is located near the Sanate Abajo River in the La Altagracia Province of the Dominican Republic.

== World Heritage Status ==
This site was added to the UNESCO World Heritage Tentative List on May 5, 2002, in the Cultural category.
