= Manchón-Guamuchal =

Manchón-Guamuchal Nature Reserve
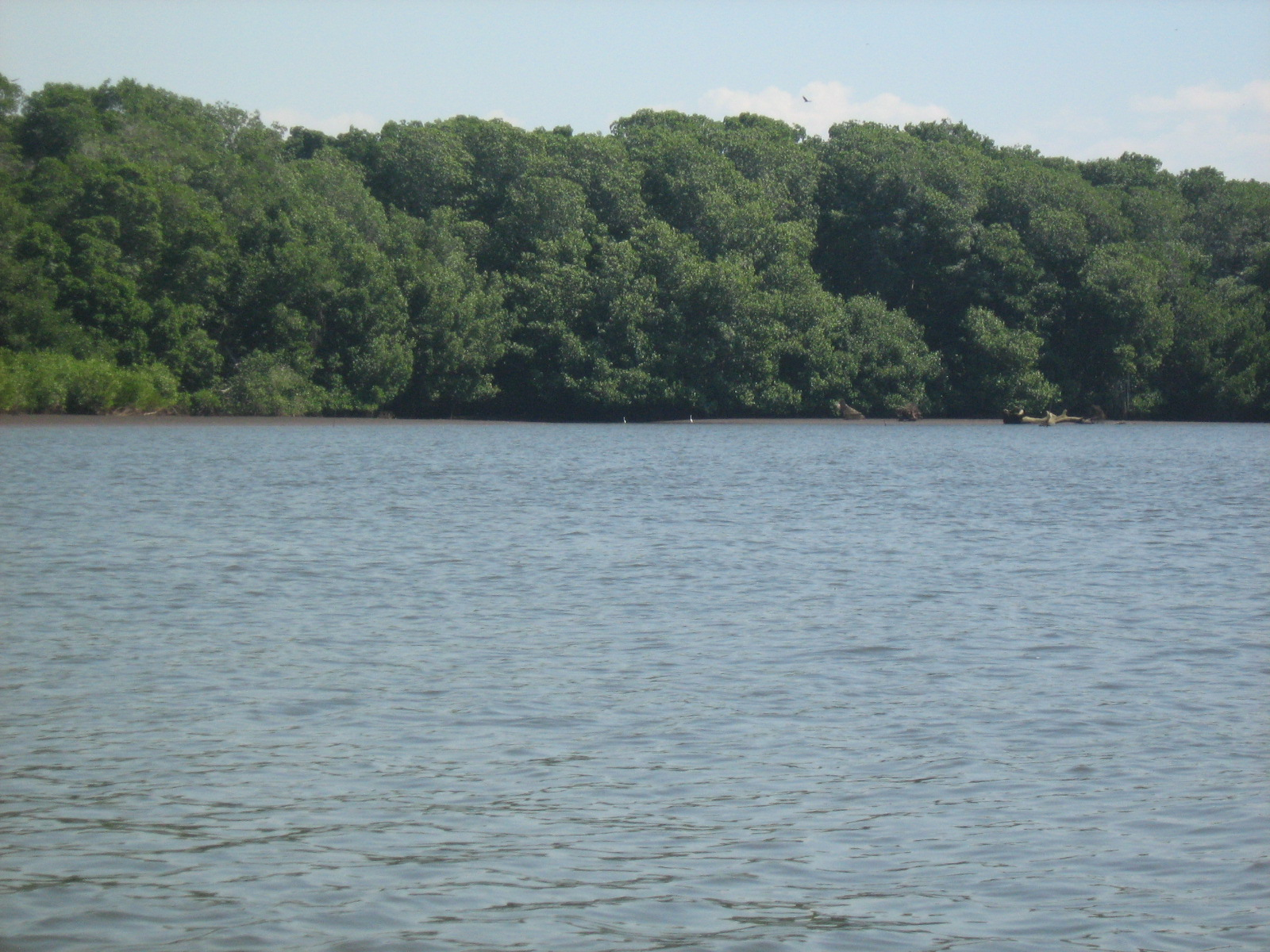
- Manchón Guamuchal
- Interactive map of Manchón-Guamuchal; Nature Reserve
- Location: San Marcos, Retalhuleu, Guatemala
- Coordinates: 14°28′47″N 92°7′23″W
- Area: 135 km^{2} (52 sq mi)
- Visitors: allowed

Manchón Guamuchal is a litoral wetland zone situated along the Pacific coast of Guatemala. It is one of the last remaining mangrove forest area on the pacific coast of Guatemala and an important stop for migratory birds. It was declared a Ramsar site in 1995.
