= Craniformin =

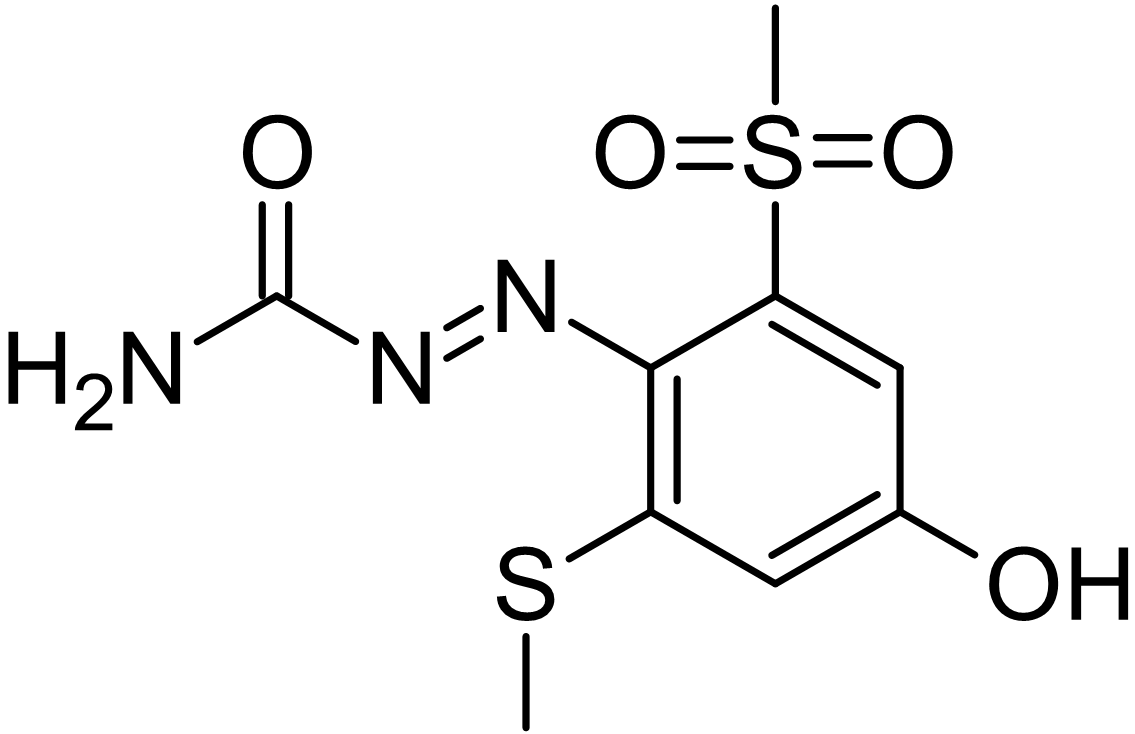
- Chemical structure of craniforman

Names
- IUPAC name (4-Hydroxy-2-methylsulfanyl-6-methylsulfonylphenyl)iminourea

Identifiers
3D model (JSmol)	Interactive image
ChemSpider	78434640
PubChem CID	135430994
- InChI: InChI=1S/C9H11N3O4S2/c1-17-6-3-5(13)4-7(18(2,15)16)8(6)11-12-9(10)14/h3-4,13H,1-2H3,(H2,10,14) Key: QWZDFNVHXWEVJD-UHFFFAOYSA-N
- SMILES: CSC1=C(C(=CC(=C1)O)S(=O)(=O)C)N=NC(=O)N

Properties
Chemical formula	C_{9}H_{11}N_{3}O_{4}S_{2}
Molar mass	289.32 g·mol^{−1}
- Except where otherwise noted, data are given for materials in their standard state (at 25 °C [77 °F], 100 kPa). Infobox references

Craniformin is a chemical compound found in some species of puffball mushrooms, notably Calvatia craniiformis, the brain puffball.
