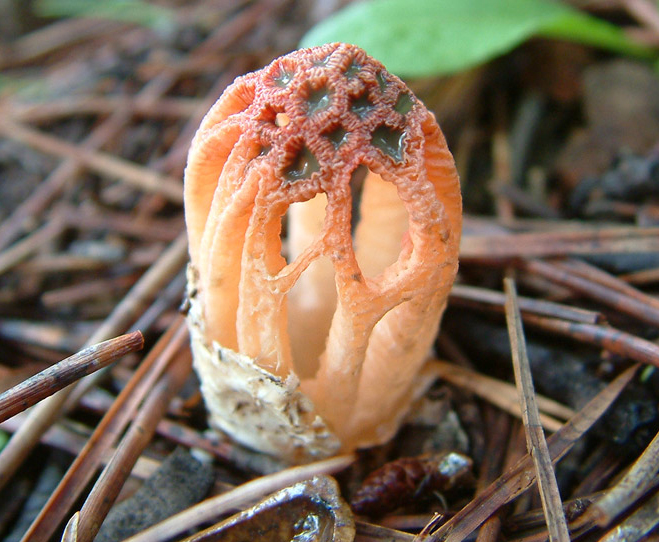

Scientific classification
- Kingdom: Fungi
- Division: Basidiomycota
- Class: Agaricomycetes
- Order: Phallales
- Family: Phallaceae
- Genus: Colus
- Species: C. hirudinosus

Binomial name
- Colus hirudinosus Cavalier & Séchier (1835)

Synonyms
- Clathrus hirudinosus (Cavalier & Sechier) Tul. (1849)

= Colus hirudinosus =

Species of fungus

Colus hirudinosus is a species of stinkhorn fungus (Gasteromycete) found in Asia, Australia, northern Africa, and southern Europe. The fruit body has a short, thick stalk that divides into several spongy, wrinkled, stalk-like, orange to red columns that are united at the top, thus forming a lattice. The spores are found within the gleba—a dark, olive-brown slime that coats the inside of the columns. Spores are spread by insects that are attracted by the fetid smell of the gleba, eat the spores, and pass them on to germinate elsewhere.

== Taxonomy ==
The species was first described as Clathrus hirudinosus by Cavalier and Séchier, in 1835, from specimens collected in Toulon, France. According to American mycologist Curtis Gates Lloyd, the species was first documented by Joseph-François Soleirol in Corsica in 1820, who sent specimens to Camille Montagne. Lloyd believed that the authorship of the species should be credited to Montagne:

"While the plant is advertised as "Cavalier and Séchier" it is evident to me it should bear the trade name of "Montagne". Cavalier and Séchier were local men who undoubtedly got all their information from Montagne and the fact that they used the specific name on Montagne's specimen was surely not a mere coincidence. They did not mention Montagne in their article but took all the credit (?) to themselves which, however, is customary in such conditions."

Colus hirudinosus is the type species of the genus Colus.

== Description ==
Fruit bodies begin their development in the form of an egg like structure. Measuring about 1 cm (0.4 in) in diameter, the roughly spherical egg is white or mottled with brown on the upper part. Attached underneath are one or more thin white rhizomorphs. After emerging from the egg, the fruit body consists of a short, thick stalk from which between four and six vertical, arching columns arise. These columns, colored pink below and gradually deepening in color to red near the top, have a corrugated surface texture. The columns often fork near the top into additional branches that support a lattice-like, or clathrate dome. The meshes of the fertile net are roughly polyhedral and there is an abrupt transition from columns to lattice. The olive-green gleba is held on the bottom of and in between the meshes of the clathrate dome, and the inner side of the upper arms. It has a fetid odor, similar to feces, which attracts flies that visit the mushroom, consume the gleba, and deposit the spores elsewhere to germinate. Spores produced by C. hirudinosus are rod-shaped, hyaline (translucent), and measure 3.5–6.5 by 1–1.75 μm. Structurally, the spongy columns comprise a double layer of tubes, a large inner one and two or three outer ones. The remnants of the egg tissue enclose the base of the structure as a volva.

=== Similar species ===
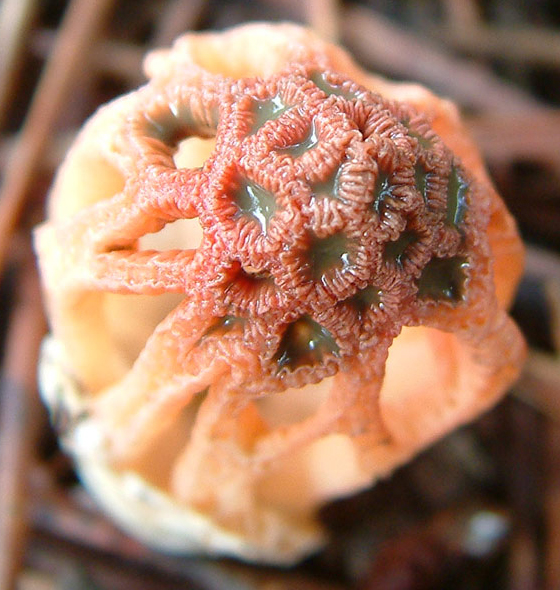
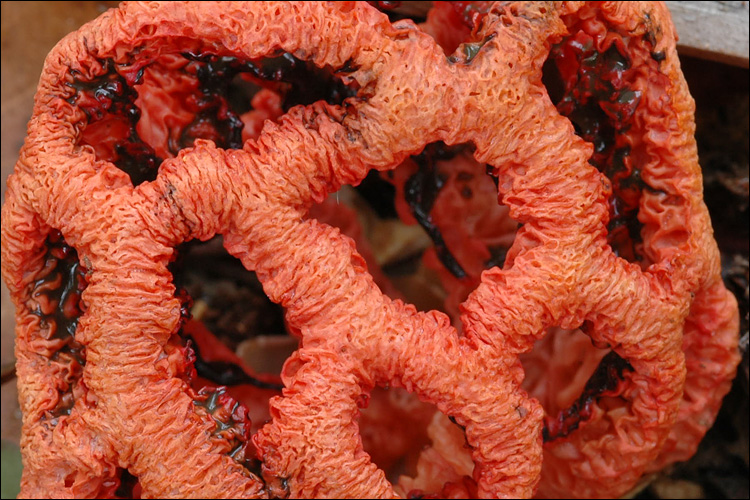
Lattices of Colus hiruinosus (left) and Clathrus ruber (right)

Colus pusillus, known from Australia, is quite similar in appearance to Colus hirudinosus, and it has not been definitively established whether there is one variable species or several species with minor morphological differences.

Clathrus ruber is another stinkhorn featuring a clathrate structure, but unlike Colus hirudinosus, C. ruber has larger lattice mesh holes, and the lattice extends all the way to the base of the fruiting structure.

== Habitat and distribution ==
Colus hirudinosus is believed to be saprobic, meaning that it obtains nutrients by decomposing dead or decaying organic matter. Fruit bodies grow in manured soil, in sand, but frequently also under Cistus shrubs, which has led some to suggest the fungus may also act as a facultative endophyte. The species is most widespread in Europe, particularly Mediterranean countries (including Corsica, Cyprus, France, Greece, Italy, Portugal, Israel and Spain), but also as far north as Switzerland. In Africa, it has been reported from Algeria and Nigeria, while it has also been found in Asia and Australia. In the Caribbean, it is known only from Jamaica.
