= Aseroe coccinea =

Scientific classification
- Kingdom: Fungi
- Division: Basidiomycota
- Class: Agaricomycetes
- Order: Phallales
- Family: Phallaceae
- Genus: Aseroe
- Species: A. coccinea

Binomial name
- Aseroe coccinea Imazeki et Yoshimi ex Kasuya
- Found only in Tochigi Prefecture, Japan

Species of fungus

Aseroe coccinea Mycological characteristics
- Smooth hymenium
- No distinct cap
- Hymenium attachment is irregular or not applicable
- Stipe is bare
- Spore print is olive-brown
- Ecology is saprotrophic
- Edibility is unknown

Aseroe coccinea is a species of stinkhorn fungus in the genus Aseroe. First reported in Japan in 1989, it was not formally validated as a species until 2007, the delay related to a publication error. The receptacle, or fruit body, begins as a partially buried whitish egg-shaped structure, which bursts open as a hollow white stipe with reddish arms, then erupts and grows to a height of up to 15 mm (0.6 in). It matures into a star-shaped structure with seven to nine thin reddish tubular "arms" up to 10 mm (0.4 in) long radiating from the central area. The top of the receptacle is covered with dark olive-brown spore-slime, or gleba. A. coccinea can be distinguished from the more common species A. rubra by differences in the color of the receptacle, and in the structure of the arms. The edibility of the fungus has not been reported.

== Taxonomy ==
The fungus was first described provisionally (denoted by ad interim) as Aseroe coccinea by the Japanese mycologists Yoshimi and Tsuguo Hongo in a 1989 publication with a Japanese description, based on a specimen collected on 29 September 1985, in Utsunomiya, Tochigi Prefecture, Japan. The name, however, was not published validly (nomen invalidum), according to Article 36.1 of the International Code of Botanical Nomenclature, which requires that "in order to be validly published, a name of a new taxon (algal and all fossil taxa excepted) must ... be accompanied by a Latin description or diagnosis or by a reference to a previously and effectively published Latin description or diagnosis". Taiga Kasuya reexamined the type specimen and validated the species in a 2007 Mycoscience publication. The holotype specimen is kept at the National Museum of Nature and Science in Tokyo.

The specific epithet coccinea is derived from the Latin word coccineus, and means "bright red". The mushroom's Japanese name is Aka-hitode-take (アカヒトデタケ).

== Description ==
Like all Phallaceae species, A. coccinea begins its development in the form of a roughly spherical whitish "egg" that is 10–15 mm (0.39–0.59 in) in diameter, lying on or partially submerged in the substrate. On the base of the egg is a white strand of mycelium. The exoperidium (the outer tissue layer) is white to cream-colored with a fibrous surface. The inner layer is membranous, with a hyaline (translucent) endoperidium (inner tissue layer). The slimy spore-bearing mass, the gleba, is olive-brown to greenish-black, with a slightly fetid odor. When the mushroom is mature, it covers the upper surface of a disc on the top of the receptacle. The receptacle has a cylindrical stipe, 10–15 mm (0.39–0.59 in) tall, 7–15 mm (0.28–0.59 in) in diameter at the top, somewhat fusiform (tapered at both ends) or sometimes just tapered towards the base. The stipe is pale pink near the top, white to cream at the base, spongy in texture, and hollow. The top of the receptacle is flattened to form a disc that bears 7–9, narrow, tapering "arms". The arms consist of a single bright red tube-like chamber, that is 4–10 mm (0.16–0.39 in) long and 0.7–2 mm (0.0–0.1 in) thick.

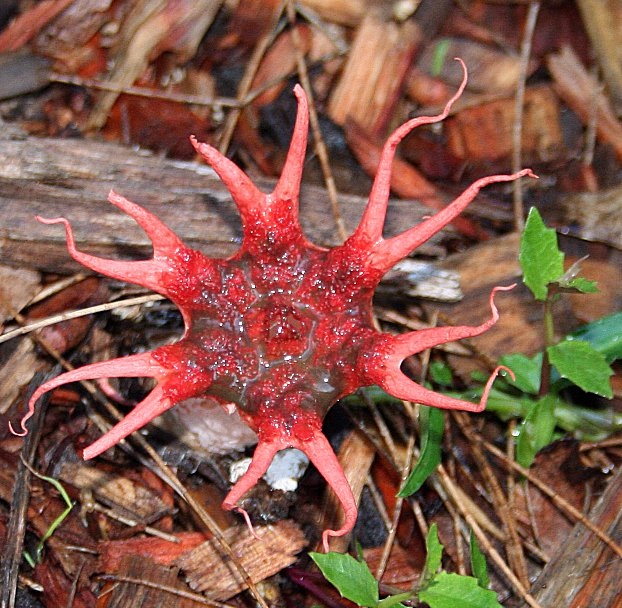
Aseroe rubra is somewhat similar in appearance, but clearly distinguished by its bifurcating (forked) arms.

The thick-walled spores are ellipsoid to cylindrical, and measure 4–5 by 2–2.5 μm. They are hyaline (translucent), have a smooth surface, and are sometimes truncated at the base. The peridium of the "egg" is divided into two distinct layers of tissue. The outer is up to 250–400 μm thick, and made of filamentous, interwoven hyphae measuring 2.5–5 μm in diameter. These hyphae are thick-walled, septate, and hyaline. Also present in this outer layer are thick-walled pseudoparenchymatous cells (angular, randomly arranged, and tightly packed) that are 7–50 μm thick, spherical or nearly so, and yellowish-brown to pale brown. The inner tissue layer of the peridium is 100–250 μm thick and made of elongated filamentous hyphae that are 2–5 μm in diameter. These thick-walled hyphae are arranged in a roughly parallel fashion, septate, and hyaline. The receptacle consists of thick-walled, roughly spherical pseudoparenchymatous cells 5–15.5 μm thick, that contain intracellular pigment.

=== Similar species ===
A. coccinea closely resembles Lysurus arachnoideus, syn Aseroe arachnoidea, but may be distinguished from the latter by its bright red arms, and its larger spores (4–5 by 2.5–3 μm in A. coccinea compared with 2.5–3.5 by 1.5 μm in S. arachnoideus). L. arachnoideus is known from Asia and West Africa. A. rubra is a relatively common pantropical species, and differs from A. coccinea in its reddish receptacle (compared with pink to cream-colored in A. coccinea) and bifurcating arms that are typically multichambered.

== Habitat and distribution ==
Although Kasuya did not explicitly define the mode of nutrition for A. coccinea, most Phallaceae species are suspected to be saprobic—decomposers of wood and plant organic matter. The fruit bodies of A. coccinea, known only from temperate regions of Japan (Tochigi Prefecture), grow solitarily or in groups on rice husks, straw, or dung. They are found from summer to autumn.
