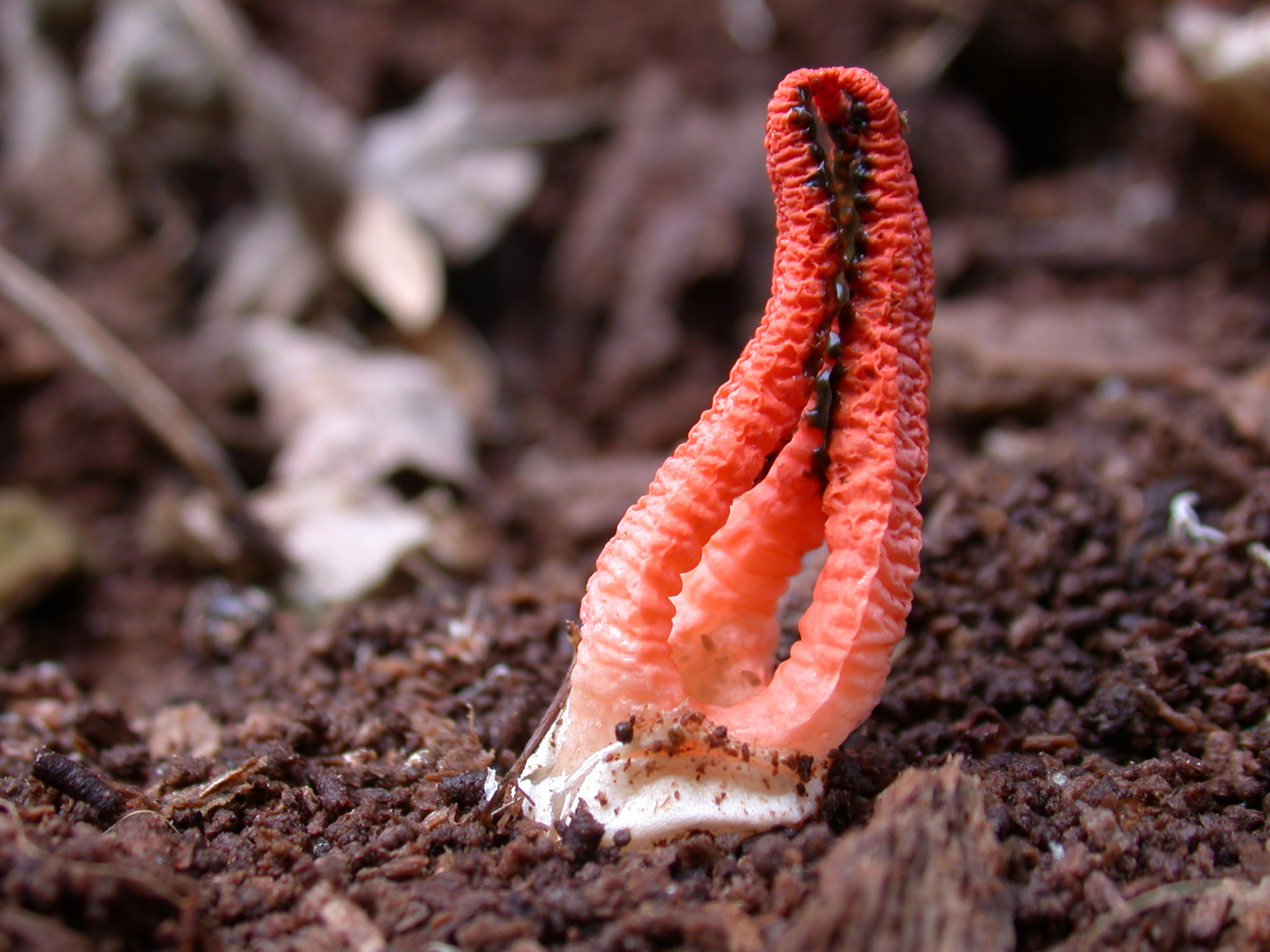

Scientific classification
- Domain: Eukaryota
- Kingdom: Fungi
- Division: Basidiomycota
- Class: Agaricomycetes
- Order: Phallales
- Family: Phallaceae
- Genus: Pseudocolus
- Species: P. fusiformis

Binomial name
- Pseudocolus fusiformis (E.Fisch.) Lloyd (1909)

= Pseudocolus fusiformis =

Species of fungus

Pseudocolus fusiformis Mycological characteristics
- Glebal hymenium
- No distinct cap
- Hymenium attachment is irregular or not applicable
- Lacks a stipe
- Spore print is olive-brown
- Ecology is saprotrophic
- Edibility is inedible

Pseudocolus fusiformis is a stinkhorn mushroom in the Phallaceae, a family well known for a remarkable range of fruit body types. It is commonly known as the stinky squid, because of its fetid odor, and its three or four upright "arms" which are connected at the top. The malodorous smell comes from the dark greenish slimy gleba covering the inside faces of the arms, and attracts insects that help to disperse the spores.

It is the most widely distributed member of the genus Pseudocolus and has been found in the United States, Australia, and Asia.

== Taxonomy ==
The first appearance of this species in the literature was in 1890, under the name Colus fusiformis, when Eduard Fischer wrote a description based on a painting he found in the Paris Museum of Natural History. In his 1944 monograph on the Gasteromycetes of Australia and New Zealand, Gordon Herriot Cunningham considered this naming to be a nomen nudum—not published with an adequate description. However, it was valid under the rules of the International Code of Botanical Nomenclature. In 1899 Penzig described the species Colus javanicus based on a single specimen found on Java, and a year later Fischer amended the name of his original Colus fusiformis to Colus javanicus, as he was not satisfied with the quality of his original description. Despite his doubts on the validity of his description, his original naming is both legitimate and has priority over C. javanicus.

In 1907, Curtis Gates Lloyd described the new genus Pseudocolus, and reduced several species to synonyms of Pseudocolus fusiformis. The first North American description of this species (as Colus schellenbergiae) was in 1916 by David Ross Sumstine; Johnson later (1929) transferred this to Pseudocollus schellenbergiae. Although Cunningham (1931) revised the genus Anthurus to include members of Pseudocolus, Dring in 1973 considered the genera to be distinct. Up until the appearance of an extensive study published in 1980, 13 different binomials had been used in the literature to name the species. Index Fungorum lists the following synonyms of P. fusiformis:

- Colus fusiformis E.Fisch. (1891)
- Colus elegans Welw. (1842)
- Anthurus rothae (Berk. ex E.Fisch.) E.Fisch. (1893)
- Colus rothae Berk. ex E.Fisch. (1893)
- Pseudocolus rothae (E.Fisch.) Yasuda (1916)
- Colus javanicus Penz. (1899)
- Pseudocolus javanicus (Penz.) Lloyd (1907)
- Anthurus javanicus (Penz.) G.Cunn. (1931)
- Pseudocolus rothae Lloyd (1907)
- Colus rothae (Lloyd) Sacc. & Traverso (1910)
- Colus schellenbergiae Sumst. (1916)
- Pseudocolus schellenbergiae (Sumst.) M.M.Johnson (1929)

== Description ==
Immature fruiting bodies resemble egg- or pear-shaped puffballs, grayish-brown to pale gray in color, with dimensions of 0.5 to 2.5 cm (1/4 to 1 in) diameter; the top surface is broken into small regions by cracks or crevices (areolate). As the fungus matures, the fruiting body cracks open and forms a stalk with tapering arms, a volva, and a spore mass known as a gleba.

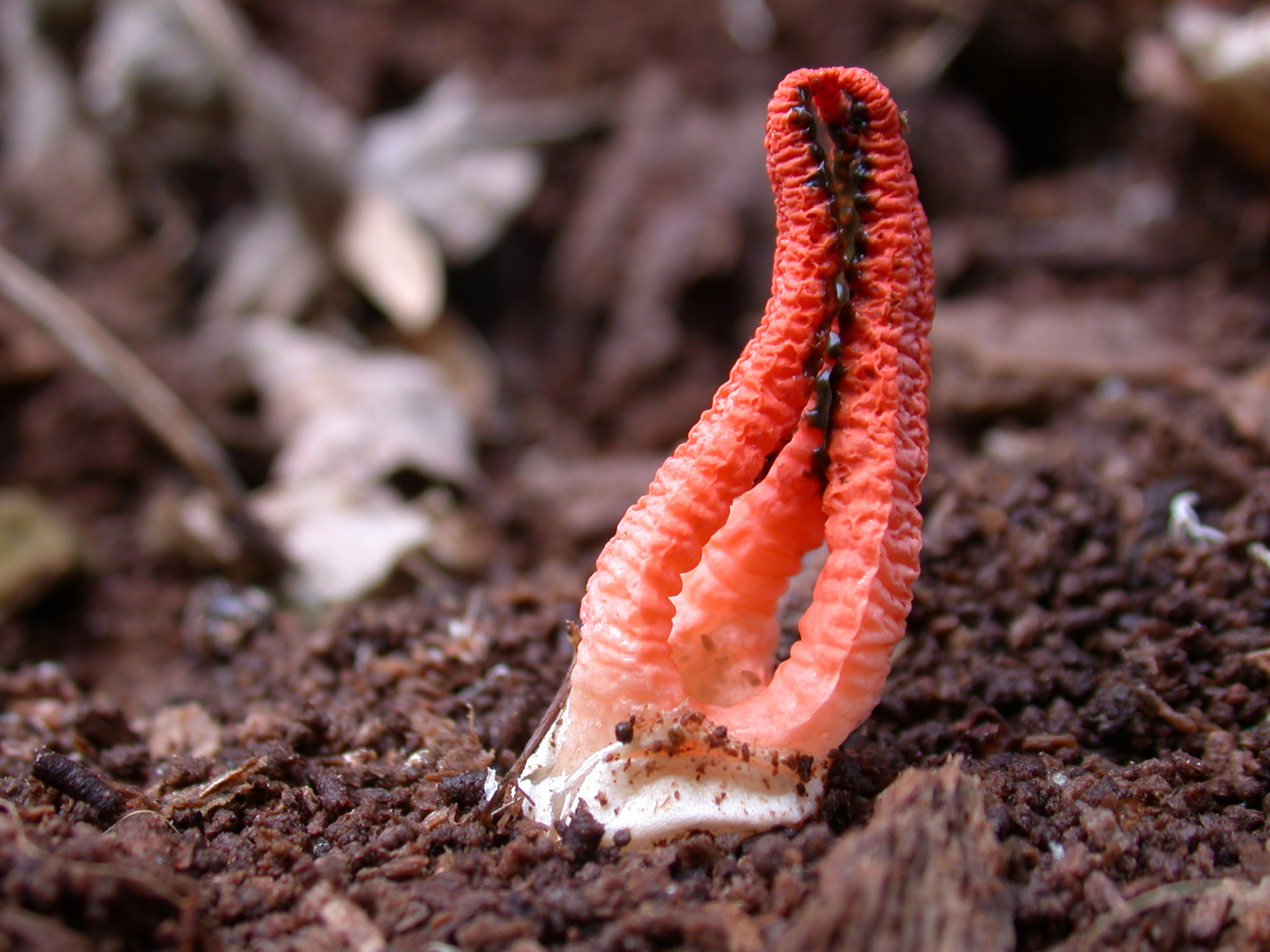
Mature fruiting bodies and bisected immature "egg" of P. fusiformis

The mature fruiting body is typically 3 to 6 cm (1 1/4 to 2 1/4 in) in height, with arms that are 2–5 times the length of the stipe. The stipe itself does not extend past the volva, and is hollow, thin-walled, chambered, wrinkled, and flares towards the upper end. The color of the stipe is white or grayish-white; it is 1 to 3.5 cm (1/2 to 1 1/2 in) in height, and 0.5 to 2.5 cm (1/4 to 1 in) thick at the widest diameter. The three or four arms extending from the stipe average 3.6 cm (1 1/2 in) in length (ranging from 1 to 13 cm (1/2 to 5 in), and wrinkled on the side bearing the gleba. The arms, which are joined at the top, are shaped like a lance (lanceolate), pointed towards the apex; they are orange-colored. The internal structure of the arms is made of chambers; one large chamber towards the outside, and typically three smaller chambers on the inside of the arm. The gleba is commonly found on the upper two-thirds of the inside surface of the arms, and is dark green and slimy. The fetid odor of the gleba, described by one author as comparable to "fresh pig manure", attracts insects that help to disperse the spores.

The spores are elliptical or ovoid, smooth, translucent (hyaline), with dimensions of 4.5–5.5 by 2–2.5 μm. The basidia, the spore-bearing cells, are attached to 6–8 sessile spores.

=== Similar species ===
The stinkhorn species Clathrus columnatus somewhat resembles P. fusiformis in that it has 3 or 4 arms that extend upwards and join at the top. However, unlike C. columnatus, the arms of P. fusiformis share a common stem, and the immature egg-form is gray or grayish brown, rather than white.

Clathrus archeri has more tentacle-like arms.

== Habitat and distribution ==
This species grows scattered or in groups on disturbed soil in coniferous or mixed forests. It is also found growing on wood chips used as mulch in gardens or for landscaping; Blanton has also reported it growing in a garden "solitary and very large".

Pseudocolus fusiformis has been collected from a variety of locations worldwide, including Europe, Australia, Japan, Java, the Philippines, Reunion Island, the United States, and Turkey.

It is thought to have been introduced from southeast Asia to North America, where it can be found from May to September. In the continental United States, it was first collected in Pittsburgh in 1915; since then it has been found in Alabama, Connecticut, Georgia, Louisiana, Florida, Massachusetts, Mississippi, New Jersey, New York, North Carolina, Rhode Island, Tennessee, and Virginia; it has also been found in Hawaii.

== Inedibility ==
Although not considered poisonous, P. fusiformis is not recommended for consumption. Some related species such as Phallus impudicus or Mutinus caninus are considered to be edible (or even delicacies) in the immature egg stage; however, the foul smell of stinkhorns at maturity would likely deter most individuals from eating them.
