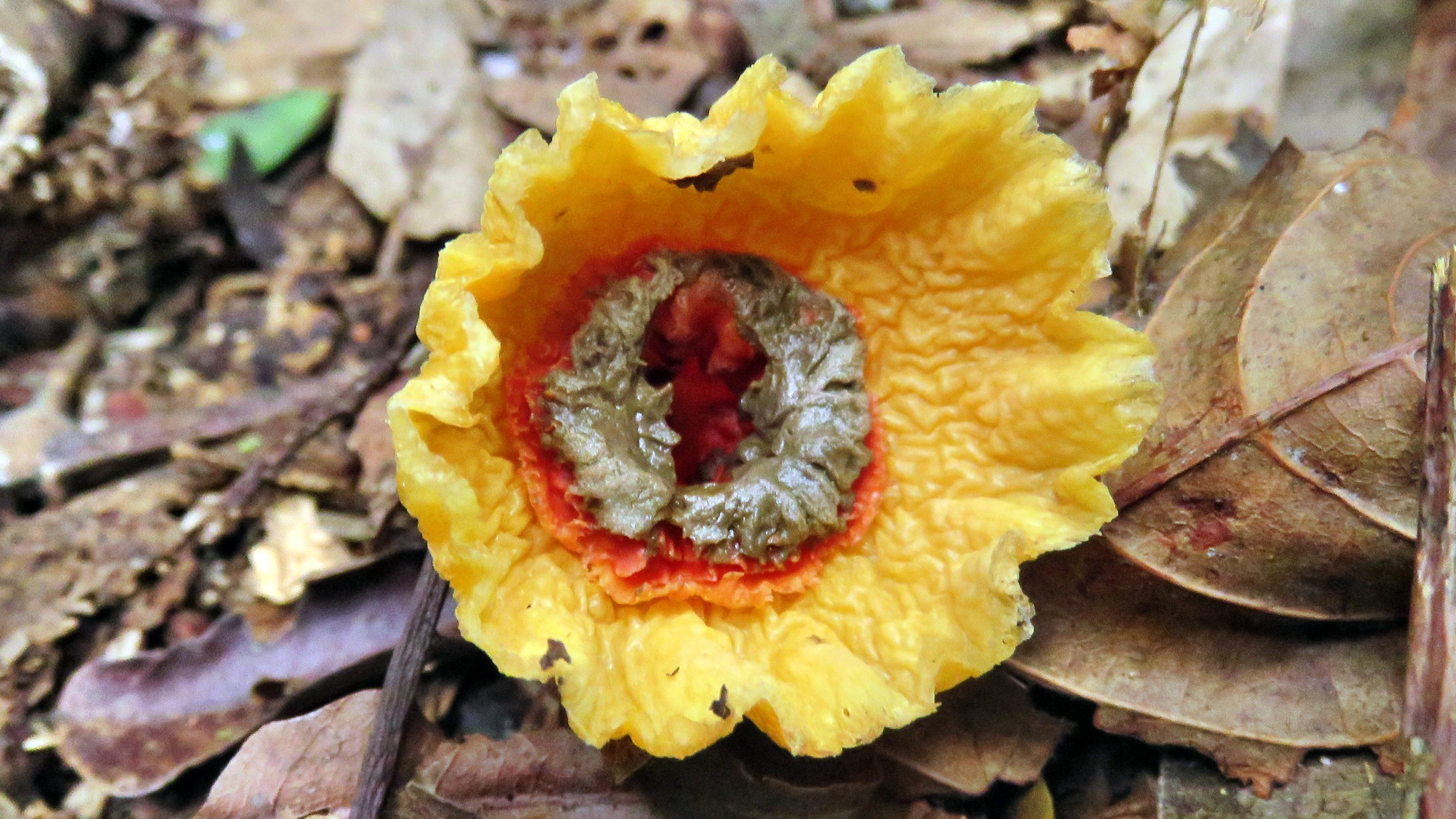
- Abrachium floriforme from Parque Nacional da Tijuca, Rio de Janeiro, Brazil

Scientific classification
- Kingdom: Fungi
- Division: Basidiomycota
- Class: Agaricomycetes
- Order: Phallales
- Family: Phallaceae
- Genus: Abrachium; Baseia & T.S. Cabral
- Species: A. floriforme

Binomial name
- Abrachium floriforme (Baseia & Calonge) Baseia & T.S. Cabral
- Found only in Rio Grande do Norte, Brazil

Synonyms
- Aseroe floriformis Baseia & Calonge

= Abrachium =

Species of fungus

Abrachium floriforme is a species of fungus in the stinkhorn family Phallaceae. Described as a new species of Aseroe, as Aseroe floriformis, in 2005, it is known only from northeast Brazil, where it grows on sandy soil. The fruit body has a raspberry-colored stipe, and, unlike members of the genus Aseroe does not have radiating branches.

== Discovery ==
The fungus was found during collecting expeditions to the Parque Estadual Dunas do Natal and Reserva Particular do Patrimonio Natural Mata Estrela, in the Brazilian State of Rio Grande do Norte. In 2009, it was reported in the state of Bahia. The specific epithet floriforme/floriformis refers to the mushroom's resemblance to a flower. The new generic name, "Abrachium," means "without arms," in reference to how the fruiting body has a flower-like central disc instead of a cluster of branched arms like in the fruiting bodies of Aseroe.

== Description ==
Immature fruit bodies start out as roughly spherical "eggs", 15–20 mm (0.6–0.8 in) in diameter, on or near the surface of the ground. The eggs are white to yellowish, with robust white mycelial cords. The volva is made of an internal, hyaline (translucent), gelatinous layer as well as a membranous structure that is made of branching, hyaline, septate hyphae measuring 3–7 μm in diameter. The stipe is cylindrical, spongy, reddish to pink, 30–40 mm (1.2–1.6 in) high and 5–8 mm (0.2–0.3 in) wide. It has a pseudoparenchymatous structure (compactly interwoven short-celled filaments that resemble the parenchyma of higher plants) made of spherical cells that are 12–45 μm diameter that contain intracellular pigment. The fruit body has the same pseudoparenchymatous cellular morphology. It is sunflower-shaped, pinkish, 15–35 mm (0.6–1.4 in) in diameter, with a perforated central disc that has a reddish edge. It does not have any branches or any vestiges of them, unlike other Aseroe species. The gelatinous grayish-brown gleba accumulates in the center of the central disc. The spores are cylindrical to ellipsoid, 4–6 by 1.5–2 μm, smooth, and hyaline. The fruit body, when fresh, smells similar to cow dung. This fetid odor is common to stinkhorn fungi, and attracts insects that help to disperse the spores.
