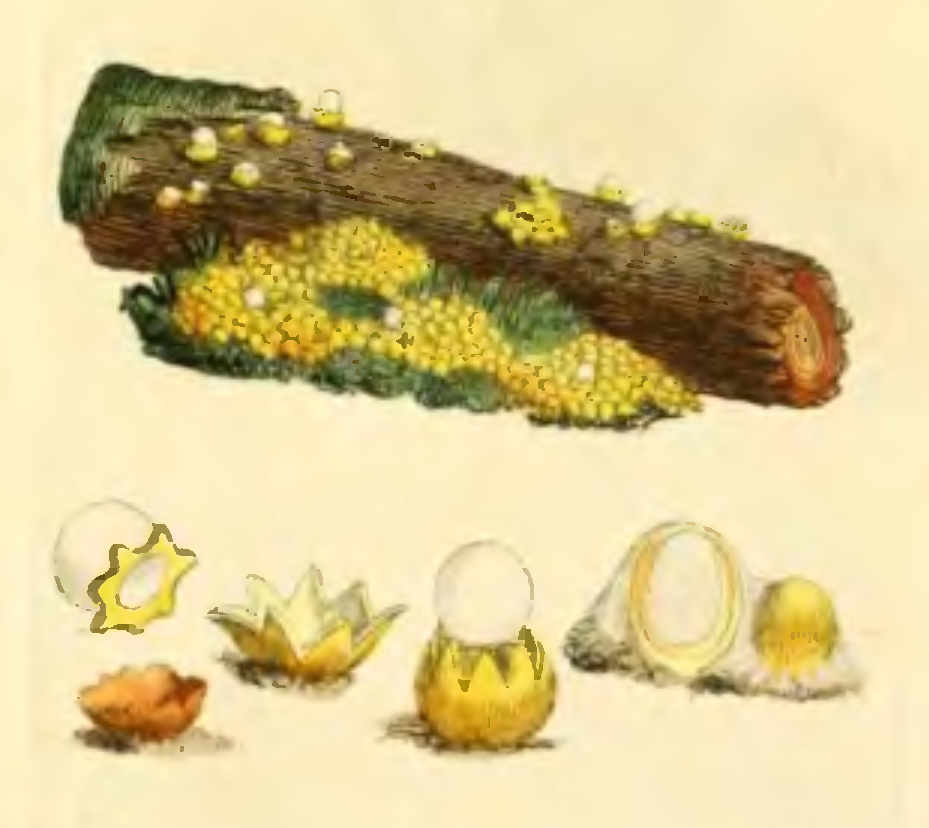
- Sphaerobolus stellatus

Scientific classification
- Kingdom: Fungi
- Division: Basidiomycota
- Class: Agaricomycetes
- Order: Geastrales
- Family: Geastraceae
- Genus: Sphaerobolus; Tode (1790)

Species
- S. ingoldii Geml, D.D. Davis & Geiser (2005); S. stellatus Tode (1790)

= Sphaerobolus =

Genus of fungi

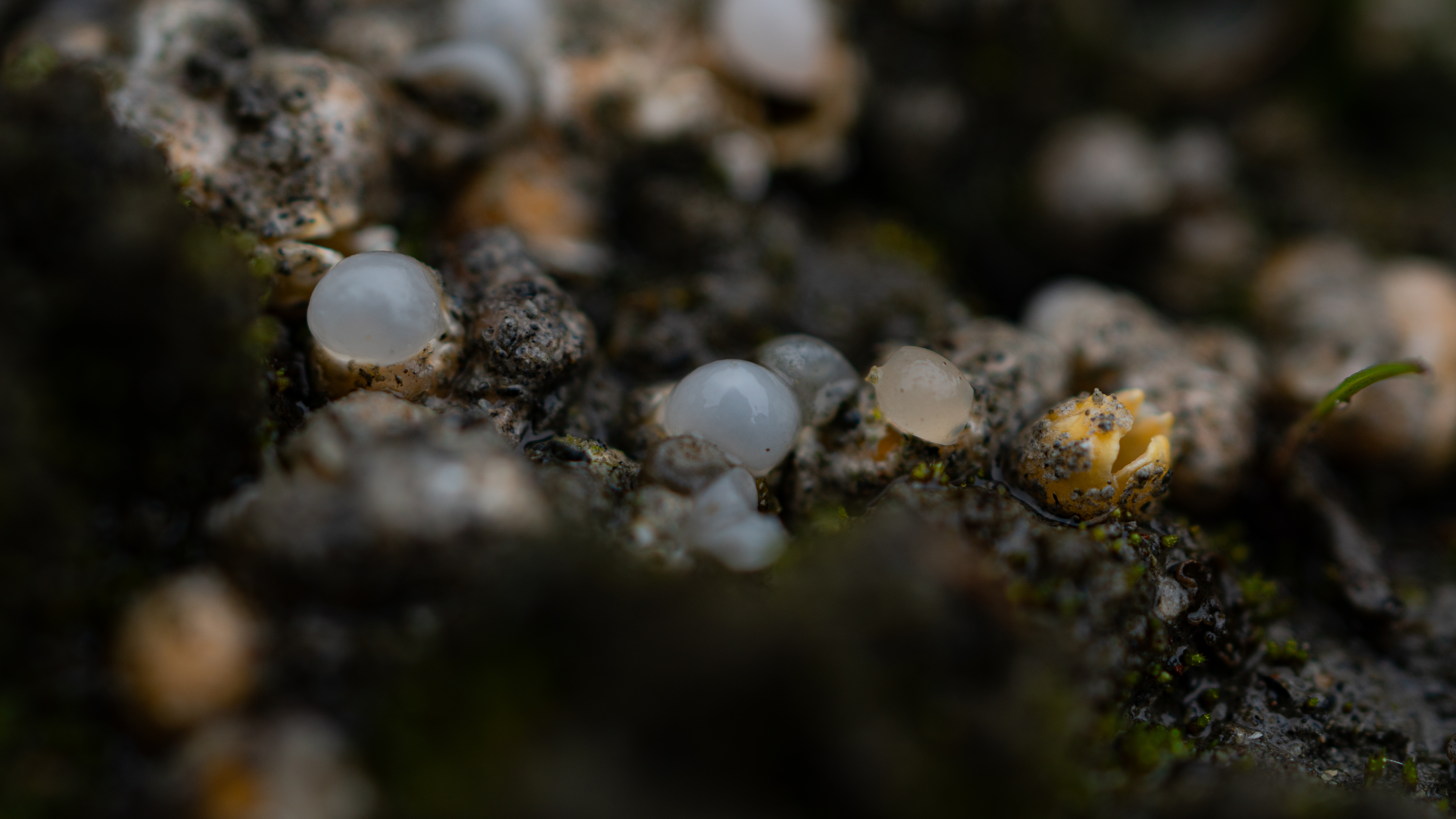
Sphaerobolus sp. on Elwha Watershed, WA USA

Sphaerobolus is a genus of fungi in the family Geastraceae. Commonly known as the "shotgun fungus", "artillery fungus" or "cannonball fungus", species discharge their spores with explosive force. Discharged spore sacs are sticky and have a tendency to strongly adhere to whatever surface they encounter, making them a nuisance to homeowners, pressure washing contractors, landscape mulch producers and insurance companies.

== Taxonomy and classification ==
The generic name is derived from the Greek words sphaer, meaning "sphere", and obolus, meaning "to throw". Sphaerobolus was first described by the Italian priest and biologist Pier Antonio Micheli (as Carpobolus) in 1729. Formerly, the genus was placed either in its own family, the Sphaerobolaceae, in the order Sclerodermatales, or, more commonly, in the order Nidulariales. Currently, the genus is placed in the family Geastraceae.

Recent phylogenetic analysis suggests that Sphaerobolus should be placed in the gomphoid-phalloid clade along with related genera like Geastrum, Phallus, Pseudocolus, Ramaria, Clavariadelphus, Gomphus and Gautieria. Within the genus, three highly supported clades may be discerned, corresponding to S. stellatus, S. iowensis, and the recently described taxon S. ingoldii.

== Description ==
Sphaerobolus stellatus, the most common species, is common on wood mulch worldwide. Basidiocarps, which grow in groups, are 1–3 mm in diameter, roughly spherical or ovoid in shape, and white, buff, pale brown or orange in color. The peridium (outer wall) consists of several layers, including a gelatinous layer. At maturity, the exoperidium (outermost layer) splits into several lobes to expose the single, reddish black to dark brown peridiole (spore casing) about 1 mm diam. The peridiole is forcibly ejected (sometimes up to several feet), leaving an evaginated endoperidium. Spores develop inside the peridiole and are typically 6–10 x 4–6 μm, elliptical to oblong in shape, thick-walled, and hyaline, and are intermixed with irregularly-shaped cells called gemmae. Species have a cosmopolitan distribution, and are usually found on dung, decaying wood (such as landscaping mulch), or vegetative litter.

== Mechanism of spore discharge ==
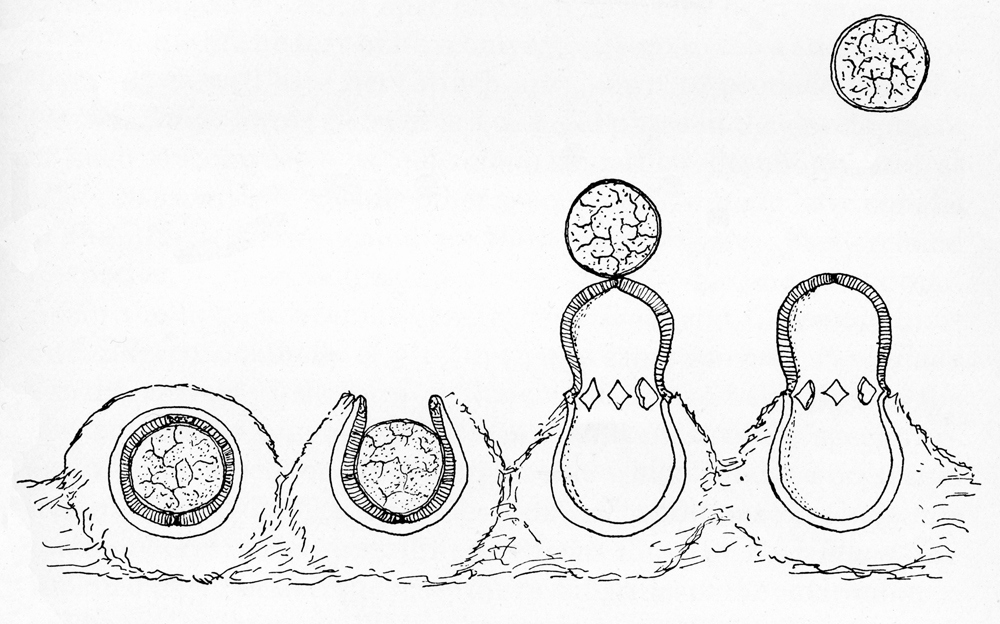
Stages in the liberation of the peridiolum by Sphaerobolus stellatus

The peridium, which consists of six distinct layers, forms two "cups" at maturity. Three layers form the outer cup, two form the inner cup, and one layer dissolves to create the fluid that bathes the gleba. After splitting of the peridal layers to expose the gleba, enzymatic conversion of glycogen to glucose increases the internal osmotic pressure and the turgidity of palisade cells in the inner peridial cup. Analysis of the glebal carbohydrates revealed an increase in glucose, mannitol, and trehalose prior to glebal discharge, which would account for the increase in osmotic pressure. Glebal discharge typically occurs 5–6 hours after the apex has split. In S. stellatus, the peridiole shoots off with an audible pop, flying up to 6 m, leaving a remnant looking like a miniature earth-star. This species is phototropic, and the nearest source of direct or reflected light will be the target for glebal discharge. The spores remain viable for several years; gemmae can also germinate.

== Species ==
- Sphaerobolus ingoldii
- Sphaerobolus iowensis
- Sphaerobolus stellatus
- Sphaerobolus jaysukhianus
