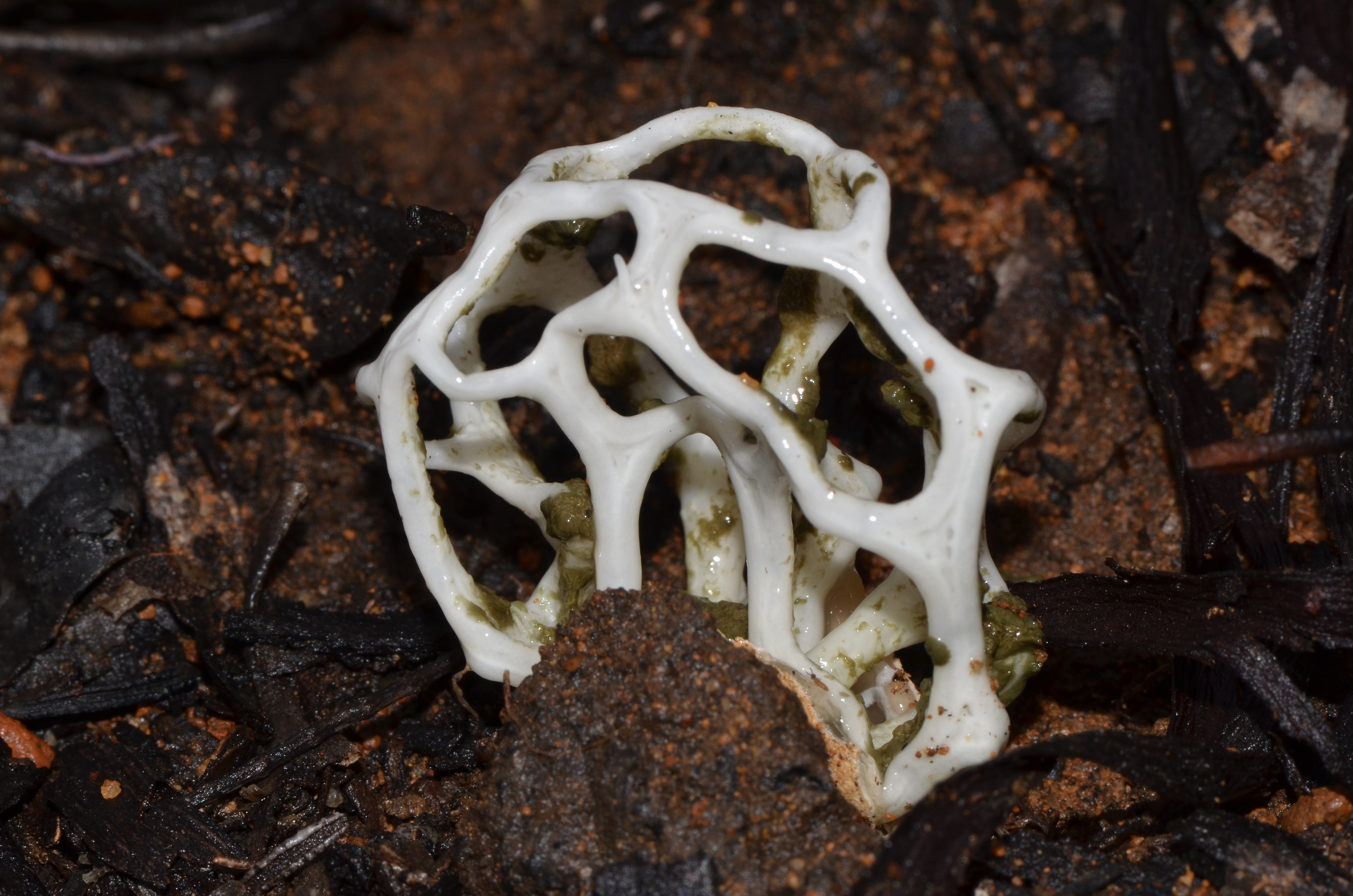
- Ileodictyon gracile, Australia

Scientific classification
- Kingdom: Fungi
- Division: Basidiomycota
- Class: Agaricomycetes
- Order: Phallales
- Family: Phallaceae
- Genus: Ileodictyon
- Species: I. gracile

Binomial name
- Ileodictyon gracile Berk. (1845)

Synonyms
- Protubera canescens G.W. Beaton & Malajczuk (1986)

= Ileodictyon gracile =

Species of fungus

Ileodictyon gracile is a saprotrophic species of fungus in the family Phallaceae. It is native to Australia, where it is commonly known as the smooth cage fungus, with reference to its basidiocarps (fruit bodies), shaped like a ball with interlaced or latticed branches partly covered on the inner surfaces with a foetid slime layer containing basidiospores.

Ileodictyon gracile is similar to and sometimes confused with Ileodictyon cibarium, which is also native to Australia. Fruit bodies of both species are whitish, mesh balls of similar size, but can be differentiated by characteristics of the receptacle arms that form the mesh. I. cibarium has a thicker mesh with arms that are wrinkled, wider, elliptical in cross section, and not thickened where the arms meet, compared to I. gracile.

== Distribution ==
Ileodictyon gracile is native to Australia, but is not known with certainty from New Zealand. The species has also been found in Asia, in China, India, Japan, and Korea, possibly as a result of it being introduced. It is also known in Europe from England, Italy, Portugal, and Spain where it is certainly introduced.
