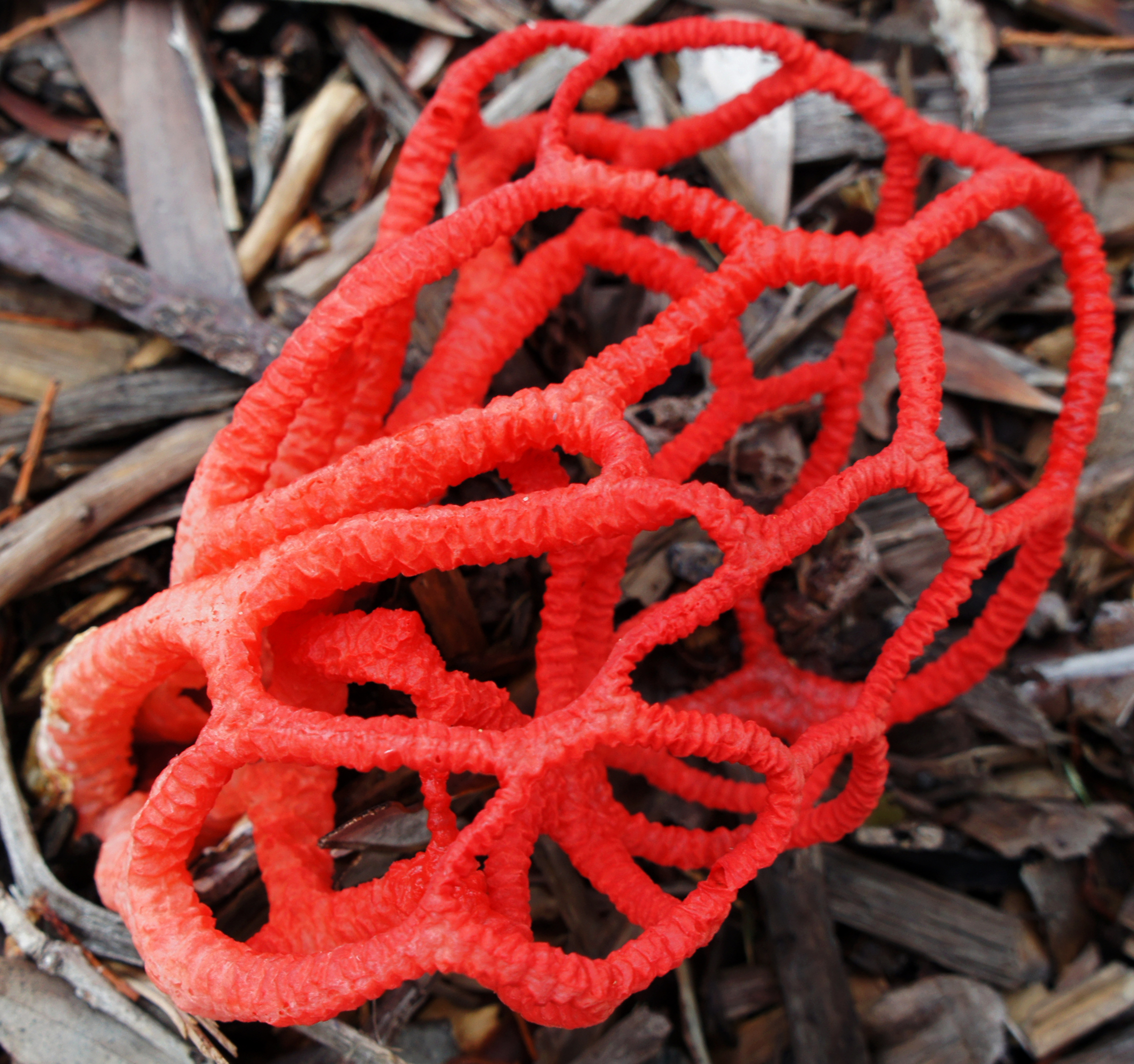
- Colus pusillus growing on woodchip mulch, Brisbane, Queensland

Scientific classification
- Kingdom: Fungi
- Division: Basidiomycota
- Class: Agaricomycetes
- Order: Phallales
- Family: Phallaceae
- Genus: Colus
- Species: C. pusillus

Binomial name
- Colus pusillus (Berk.) Reichert

Synonyms
- Clathrus pusillus Berk. (1845); Clathrella pusilla (Berk.) E.Fisch. (1886)

= Colus pusillus =

Species of fungus

Colus pusillus is a species of fungus in the family Phallaceae. It is found in Australia. It is sometimes known as the craypot stinkhorn or basket stinkhorn, a reference to the unique appearance of the fruiting bodies which consist of vivid red, wrinkled arms that branch and connect to form a cage-like structure reminiscent to that of the related species Clathrus ruber. This fungus is saprobic and makes frequent appearances on garden mulch as a result.

Like all stinkhorns, the fruit body of C. pusillus begins as an egg-like structure. The eggs of C. pusillus are typically off-white, with a red/purple tinge and a faint latticed pattern on the surface. They are anchored to the substrate by one or more root-like rhizomorphs: thickened mycelial strands. The membrane of the "egg" soon ruptures, releasing the rapidly expanding mature receptacle, which can reach a height of around 15 cm. The interior of the cage is covered by an unevenly distributed glebal slime, which contains the fungal spores. This slime is olive-green in colour and has a foul smell, which attracts insects that distribute the fungus' spores to a suitable location.
