= Protuberella =

Scientific classification
- Kingdom: Fungi
- Division: Basidiomycota
- Class: Agaricomycetes
- Order: Phallales
- Family: Phallaceae
- Genus: Protuberella; S. Imai & A. Kawam. (1958)

Type species
- Protuberella borealis (S. Imai) S. Imai & Kawam. (1958)

Genus of fungi

Protuberella is a genus of fungi in the family Phallaceae. A monotypic genus, it contains the single species Protuberella borealis.

== Species ==
- Protuberella borealis
