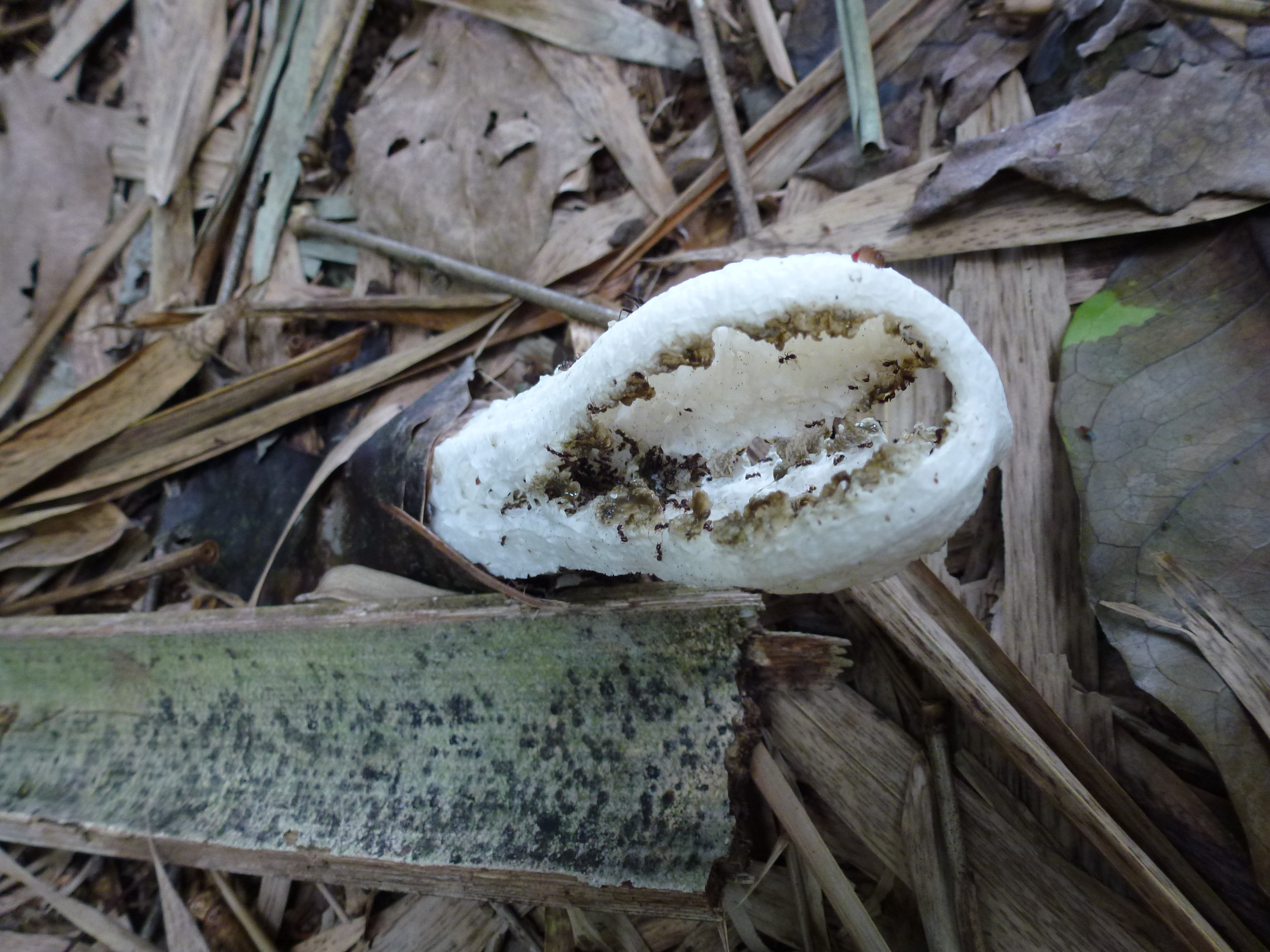
- Blumenavia angolensis

Scientific classification
- Kingdom: Fungi
- Division: Basidiomycota
- Class: Agaricomycetes
- Order: Phallales
- Family: Phallaceae
- Genus: Blumenavia; A.Möller (1895)

Type species
- Blumenavia rhacodes A.Möller (1895)

Species
- Blumenavia angolensis Blumenavia rhacodes Blumenavia toribiotalpaensis

= Blumenavia =

Genus of fungi

Blumenavia is a genus of fungi in the family Phallaceae. The genus contains three species found in South America and Africa.

== Species ==
- Blumenavia angolensis
- Blumenavia baturitensis
- Blumenavia crucis
- Blumenavia heroica
- Blumenavia rhacodes
- Blumenavia toribiotalpaensis
