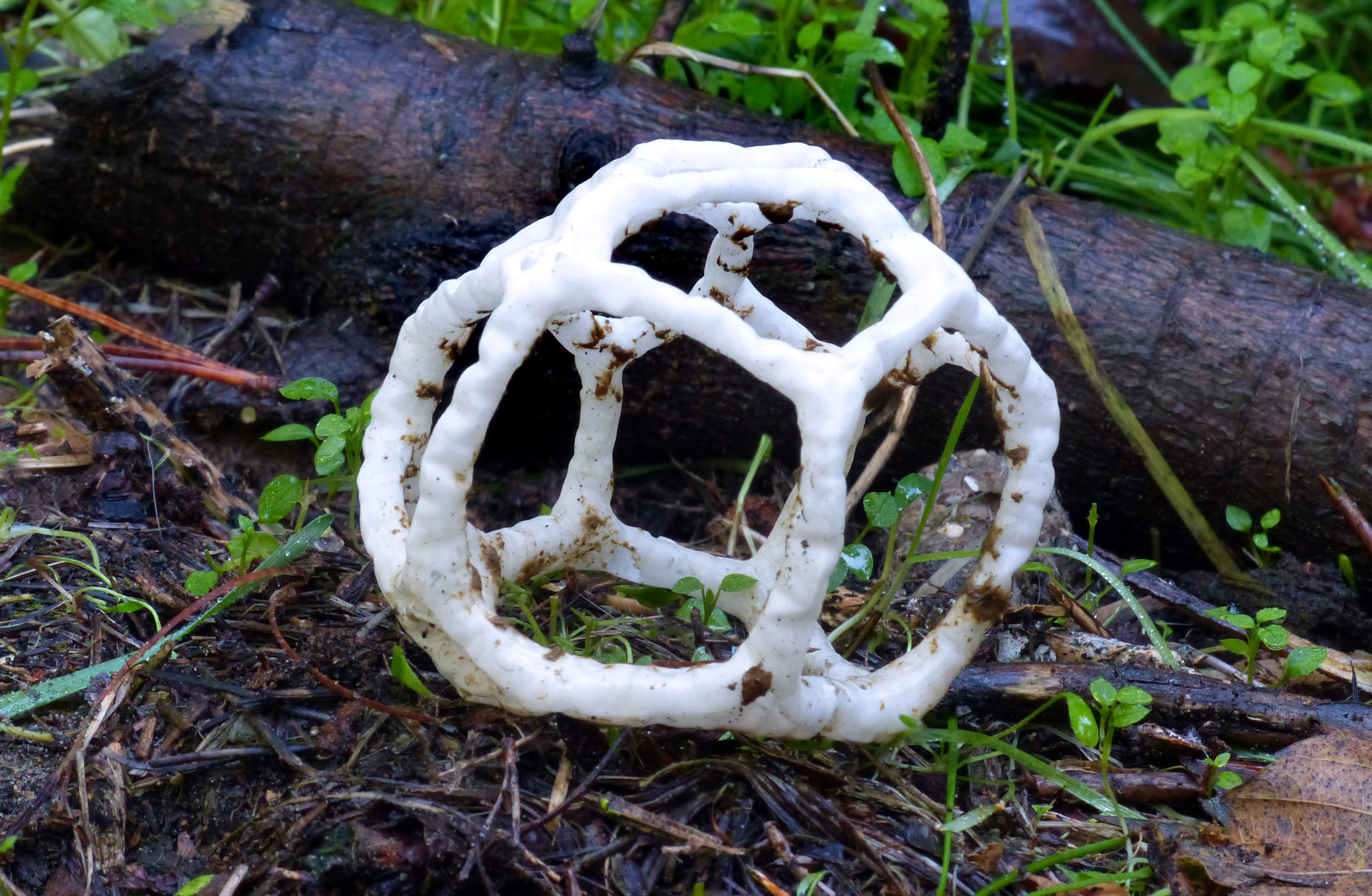
- Fruiting body of I. cibarium

Scientific classification
- Kingdom: Fungi
- Division: Basidiomycota
- Class: Agaricomycetes
- Order: Phallales
- Family: Phallaceae
- Genus: Ileodictyon
- Species: I. cibarium

Binomial name
- Ileodictyon cibarium Tul. & C. Tul. (1844)

Synonyms
- Clathrus cibarius E.Fisch. (1886); Ileodictyon cibarium var. giganteum Colenso. (1893); Ileodictyon giganteum Colenso. (1893); Clathrus tepperianus F.Ludw. (1890)

= Ileodictyon cibarium =

Species of fungus

Ileodictyon cibarium
- Mycological characteristics
- Glebal hymenium
- Spore print is olive-brown

Ileodictyon cibarium, commonly known as the white basket fungus or basket fungus, is a species of fungus in the family Phallaceae. The fungus was first described by Edmond Tulasne and Charles Tulasne from material collected in Akaroa. The fungus is found in Argentina, Chile, Australia, and New Zealand. It has also been introduced to East Africa and Southern England. The fruiting bodies develop in two distinct stages: first an "egg stage", followed by a "white-net" lattice stage, which expands into a shape comparable to that of a fullerene.

The arms of the lattice stage are covered in sticky, spore-bearing gleba that attracts flies and other insects, which disperse the spores. Mature fruiting bodies can also roll across the ground when pushed by the wind. The fungus was traditionally consumed by the indigenous Māori people of New Zealand and is also present in Māori mythology.

== Taxonomy ==
Ileodictyon cibarium was first described by Edmond Tulasne and Charles Tulasne, and the work was published by the French naval surgeon Étienne Raoul in 1844. The collections were made in Akaroa, New Zealand. The species has four recognised synonyms. The related species, Ileodictyon gracile, first described from Western Australia, is smaller than I. cibarium, with thinner arms and a smooth, unwrinkled lattice. It was previously thought that an Ileodictyon species from New Zealand sand dunes with a less pungent odour was suspected to represent I. gracile or another undescribed species. However, DNA sequence data have shown that these populations also belong to I. cibarium. I. cibarium is very closely related to I. gracile and Protubera canescens.

=== Etymology ===
The genus name, Ileodictyon, means 'intestinal net', deriving from ileo- ('intestinal') and dictyon ('net'). The specific epithet (second part of the scientific name), cibarium, means 'relating to food'. There is an estimated 35 different Māori language names referring to I. cibarium. Some of the names refer to thunder, whatitiri, which may suggest the fruiting bodies popped up after storms. Some Māori names for the fungus include tūtae kēhua ('ghost droppings'), tūtae whatitiri ('the faeces of Whaitiri [a mythological thunder god]'), whareatua, kōkirikiri whetū, kōpurawhetū, korokorowhetū, wheterau, popo whaitiri, tikowhatitiri, paruwhatitiri, mata kupenga, and tūtae whetū. The species is commonly known in English as the 'white basket fungus' or 'basket fungus'.

== Description ==
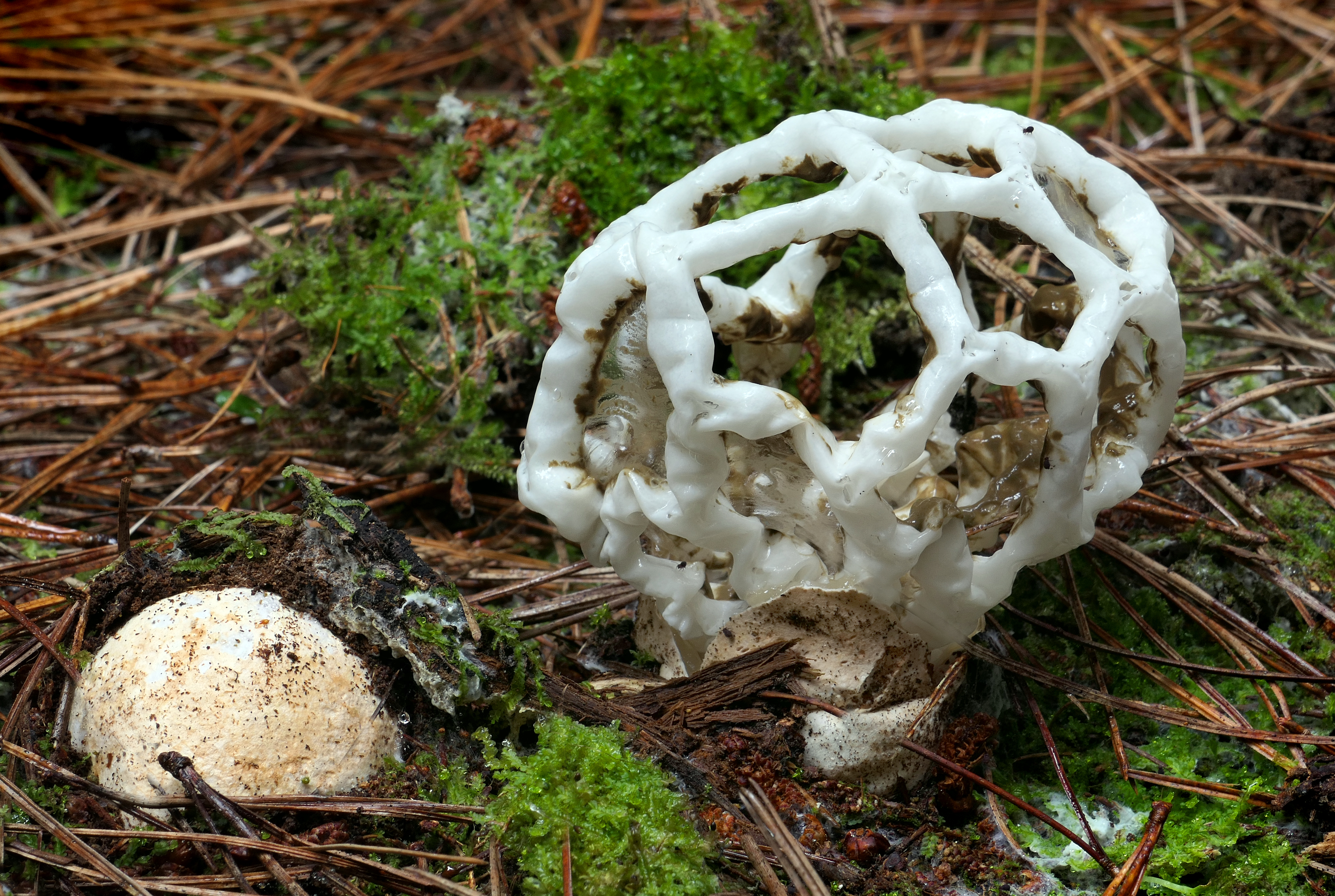
Two distinct stages of I. cibarium: the "egg-like" stage (left) and the "white-net" lattice stage (right)

The mature fruiting bodies of I. cibarium are comparable to the shape of a fullerene

Ileodictyon cibarium grows in two distinct stages: first an "egg stage" followed by the white-net lattice stage. The developing fruiting bodies (basidiocarps), or "eggs", are white, nearly globe-shaped to obovate, and up to 7 cm (2.8 in) in diameter. Mature fruiting bodies are white and initially globe-shaped. They are clathrate (lattice-like) and are variable in size, typically reaching 10 cm (4 in) in diameter, but occasionally growing as large as 25 cm (10 in) in diameter. At maturity, the fruiting body can detach from the net-like marked volva, the outer layer of the egg-like structure at the base.

The mature fruiting bodies form a lattice with 10–30 polygonal meshes, which are variable in size, but are generally similar in shape, comparable to the shape of a fullerene. The arms are up to 1 cm (0.39 in) wide and are of uniform thickness. In immature specimens, the arms are folded lengthwise while enclosed in the "egg" stage. As the fruiting body expands, these folds disappear, leaving the arms smooth. The gleba forms an olive-brown layer covering the entire inner surface of the arms. The spores are smooth and measure 4–6 × 2–2.5 µm. The different growth stages of I. cibarium were illustrated by John Buchanan.

=== Edibility ===
The indigenous Māori people of New Zealand traditionally used I. cibarium as a food source while it was still in the egg-like state. The outer layer of the fruiting bodies were reported to have been cooked by roasting them over fire or steaming them in a hāngī, an earth oven. The texture of the outer layer has been described as "soft" and "jelly-like". According to Vennell (2023), the taste "somewhat resembles a strange, otherwordly potato, crispy on the outside and gooey in the middle".

== Distribution and habitat ==
Ileodictyon cibarium is naturally found in Argentina, Chile, Australia, and New Zealand. There was also a possible sighting of the fungus in Brazil's Rio Grande do Norte region in 2006, but Ribeiro et al. (2022) calls this find "questionable", suggesting that further analysis is needed of the material. I. cibarium has also been introduced to East Africa and Southern England, likely through the transfer of soil. I. cibarium has been observed growing on soil in mulched garden beds, sand dunes, meadows, and in forests. Fruiting primarily occurs from April to August in New Zealand.

== Ecology ==
The fruiting bodies of I. cibarium use flies and other insects to disperse their spores. They are attracted to the I. cibarium's strong, unpleasant smell, which has been likened to faeces. As the insects walk over the sticky gleba, the spores stick to their bodies and are dispersed elsewhere. The mature fruiting bodies, when they are a basket-like structure, can sometimes roll around due to being pushed by the wind, like a tumbleweed.

== In culture ==
In Māori mythology, the fruiting bodies of I. cibarium were seen as markings from atua, ancestral beings. Some Māori believe the basket-like structures are the fishing nets of Taramainuku, a god associated with the Matariki star cluster. The use of the fungus as a food source was particularly valued in the Hawke's Bay area. The fungus may be the namesake of the town Waipukurau, with the name suggesting a watering hole where I. cibarium was soaked before eating.

== Works cited ==
Books

- Sisson, Liv (2023). Fungi of Aotearoa: A Curious Forager's Field Guide. Auckland, New Zealand: Penguin Books. ISBN 978-1-76104-787-9.
- Vennell, Robert (2023). The Forgotten Forest: In Search of the Lost Plants and Fungi of Aotearoa. Auckland, New Zealand: HarperCollins Publishers. ISBN 978-1-77554-219-3.

Journals

- Buchanan, P.K.; Cooper, Jerry A. (2020). "John Buchanan's pre-1880 records and illustrations of New Zealand fungi". Records of the Auckland Museum (55). doi:10.32912/ram.2020.55.3.
- Dring, D. M. (1980). "Contributions towards a Rational Arrangement of the Clathraceae". Kew Bulletin. 35 (1). Springer, Royal Botanic Gardens, Kew: 1–97. ISSN 0075-5974. JSTOR 4117008.
- Gooday, Graham W.; Zerning, John (1997). "Ileodictyon cibarium — The Basket Fungus as a Buckyball". Mycologist. 11 (4): 184–186. doi:10.1016/S0269-915X(97)80105-X.
- Hosaka, K.; Bates, S. T.; Beever, R. E.; Castellano, M. A.; Colgan, W.; Dominguez, L. S.; Nouhra, E. R.; Geml, J.; Giachini, A. J.; Kenney, S. R.; Simpson, N. B.; Spatafora, J. W.; Trappe, J. M. (1 November 2006). "Molecular phylogenetics of the gomphoid-phalloid fungi with an establishment of the new subclass Phallomycetidae and two new orders". Mycologia. 98 (6): 949–959. doi:10.3852/mycologia.98.6.949. ISSN 0027-5514.
- May, Tom W.; Sinnott, Nigel; Sinnott, Alice (10 November 2020). "The Truffle-Like Protubera canescens Is an Early Developmental Stage of the Cage Fungus Ileodictyon". The Victorian Naturalist. 127 (2): 49–54. doi:10.3316/informit.319221045209503.
- Raoul, Étienne (1844). "Choix de Plantes de la Nouvelle-Zelande". Annales des Sciences Naturelles: Botanique (in Latin). 3e (Sér. 2): 114.
- Ribeiro, Mateus Santana; Cabral, Tiara Sousa; Melanda, Gislaine Cristina Souza; Oliveira, Renan de Lima; Baseia, Iuri Goulart; Silva, Bianca Denise Barbosa da (2022). "Phallales fungi (Phallomycetidae, Basidiomycota) in Brazil: First checklist and key specific for the country". The Journal of the Torrey Botanical Society. 149 (3). Torrey Botanical Society: 230–252. ISSN 1095-5674. JSTOR 48839701.
- Sandoval-Leiva, Pablo; Henríquez, José Luis; Trierveiler-Pereira, Larissa (2014). "Additions to the Chilean phalloid mycota". Mycotaxon. 128 (1): 45–54. doi:10.5248/128.45. ISSN 2154-8889.

Websites

- Cooper, Jerry (11 November 2020). "Mycological Notes 41: The Phallales (Stinkhorns) in New Zealand" (PDF). Fungal Network of New Zealand. Archived (PDF) from the original on 4 July 2026.
- "Ngā Rauropi Whakaoranga — Ileodictyon cibarium. Basket fungus.Tūtae-whatitiri. Whareatua". Manaaki Whenua – Landcare Research. 2023. Archived from the original on 14 July 2026.
