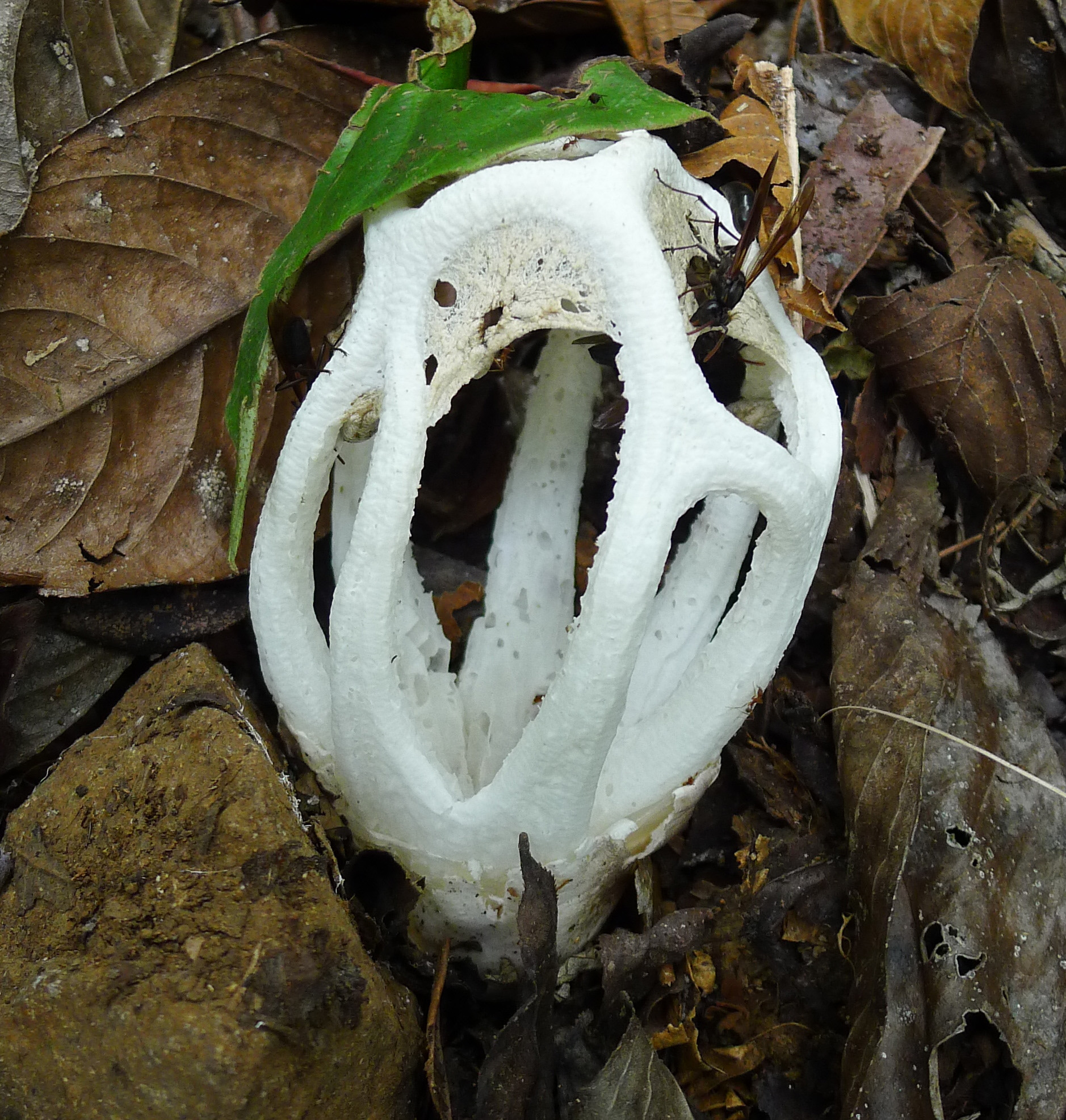
- Ligiella rodrigueziana

Scientific classification
- Kingdom: Fungi
- Division: Basidiomycota
- Class: Agaricomycetes
- Order: Phallales
- Family: Phallaceae
- Genus: Ligiella; J.A.Sáenz (1980)

Type species
- Ligiella rodrigueziana J.A.Sáenz (1980)

= Ligiella =

Single-species fungal genus

Ligiella is a fungal genus in the family Phallaceae. A monotypic genus, it contains the single species Ligiella rodrigueziana. This distinctive cage fungus develops from a soft, gelatinous egg-like structure that cracks open to reveal 4–6 thick, white, chambered columns topped with pairs of olive-green reproductive units that emit a strong cinnamon-like aroma. Found only in the high-humidity montane forests of Central America, Ligiella is unusual among stinkhorn relatives for attracting bees and ants rather than flies for spore dispersal and producing eight spores per basidium instead of the typical four.

== Taxonomy ==
The genus Ligiella was established in 1980 by the Costa Rican mycologist Jorge A. Sáenz to accommodate a distinctive species of cage fungus discovered in the tropical forests of Costa Rica. He named the species Ligiella rodrigueziana, based on specimens collected in the montane region of Cartago Province. The genus was placed in the family Clathraceae, a group of fungi known for their unusual, often latticed fruiting bodies and foul odours that typically attract flies for spore dispersal.

Later studies confirmed the unique features of Ligiella, especially its compound gleba made up of paired units on each receptacular column, its use of bees and ants (rather than flies) for spore dispersal, and its production of basidia bearing eight spores—unusual among related taxa. These traits distinguish it from other genera in the family, such as Linderiella, Laternea, and Colus, and have supported its continued recognition as a separate monotypic genus.

The genus name Ligiella honours the botanist and teacher Ligia Rodríguez, while the species epithet rodrigueziana also refers to her contributions. The type specimen was collected at 2,000 m elevation and later reexamined in additional collections from Coto Brus and Las Cruces, all in Costa Rica. These findings reinforce the fungus's apparent restriction to high-humidity montane forests in Central America.

== Description ==
Ligiella rodrigueziana produces a distinctive fruit body (gasterocarp) that develops from a roughly spherical or pear-shaped "mycoegg"—a soft, gelatinous structure up to 3 cm in diameter. Initially dull sooty grey, the upper surface of the mycoegg becomes violaceous brown with age, while the underside remains cream-coloured. As the fungus matures, the mycoegg cracks open irregularly, often along several radial splits, releasing the receptacle structure within. Remnants of the ruptured outer layer (peridium) persist as a cup-like volva at the base, and a few white, root-like strands (rhizomorphs) emerge from the base.

The outer wall of the mycoegg is made up of three layers: a thin, brownish outer layer with slightly thickened, loosely interwoven hyphae; a middle layer of white, thin-walled hyphae; and an inner gelatinous matrix containing narrow, transparent hyphae. From this egg-like structure emerges the fruit body, composed of 4–6 thick, white, chambered columns joined at the top and initially connected at the base. These columns elongate to 5–6.5 cm tall, occasionally fusing near the apex to form a simple lattice. Each column supports a pair of small, olive-green, ellipsoid glebal units containing the reproductive tissue (gleba). These units have a wrinkled surface and release a strong, cinnamon-like aroma thought to attract insects.

The spore-producing surface (hymenium) lines the inner sides of the glebal chambers and is composed of densely packed basidia without sterile cells (cystidia). Each basidium produces eight pale greenish spores, which are narrowly ellipsoid with a blunt end. These spores are statismosporic, meaning they are not forcibly ejected but rely instead on insect vectors for dispersal. Unlike most stinkhorn relatives, which attract flies, Ligiella is visited by stingless bees (e.g., Trigona fulviventris) and ants, which help spread the spores by contacting the gleba during foraging.

The architecture of the gleba is especially noteworthy: instead of a single mass, it is divided into separate units linked to each column, forming a compound structure—a feature not observed in closely related genera. This configuration, along with the use of hymenopteran insects for dispersal and the unusually high spore count per basidium (eight rather than the usual four), sets Ligiella apart from other members of the Clathraceae.
