= Neolysurus =

Scientific classification
- Kingdom: Fungi
- Division: Basidiomycota
- Class: Agaricomycetes
- Order: Phallales
- Family: Phallaceae
- Genus: Neolysurus; O.K. Mill., Ovrebo & Burk (1991)

Type species
- Neolysurus arcipulvinus O.K. Mill., Ovrebo & Burk (1991)

Genus of fungi

Neolysurus is a genus of fungi in the family Phallaceae. A monotypic genus, it contains the single species Neolysurus arcipulvinus.

== Species ==
- Neolysurus arcipulvinus
