= Kobayasia =

Scientific classification
- Kingdom: Fungi
- Division: Basidiomycota
- Class: Agaricomycetes
- Order: Phallales
- Family: Phallaceae
- Genus: Kobayasia; S.Imai & A.Kawam.

Type species
- Kobayasia nipponica (Kobayasi) S.Imai & A.Kawam. (1958)

Genus of fungi

Kobayasia is a genus of fungi in the family Phallaceae. It contains the species Kobayasia nipponica (Kobayasi) S.Imai & A.Kawam. and Kobayasia kunmingica M.Zang, K.Tao & X.X.Liu.

It is known as シラタマタケ shiratamatake; "white ball mushroom" in the Japanese language.

The genus name of Kobayasia is in honour of Yosio Kobayasi (1907 - 1993), who was a Japanese botanist (Mycology, Bryology and Algology).

The genus was circumscribed by Sanshi Imai and A. Kawamura in Sci. Rap. Yokohama Natl. Univ., Sect.2, vol.7: on page 5 in 1958.
