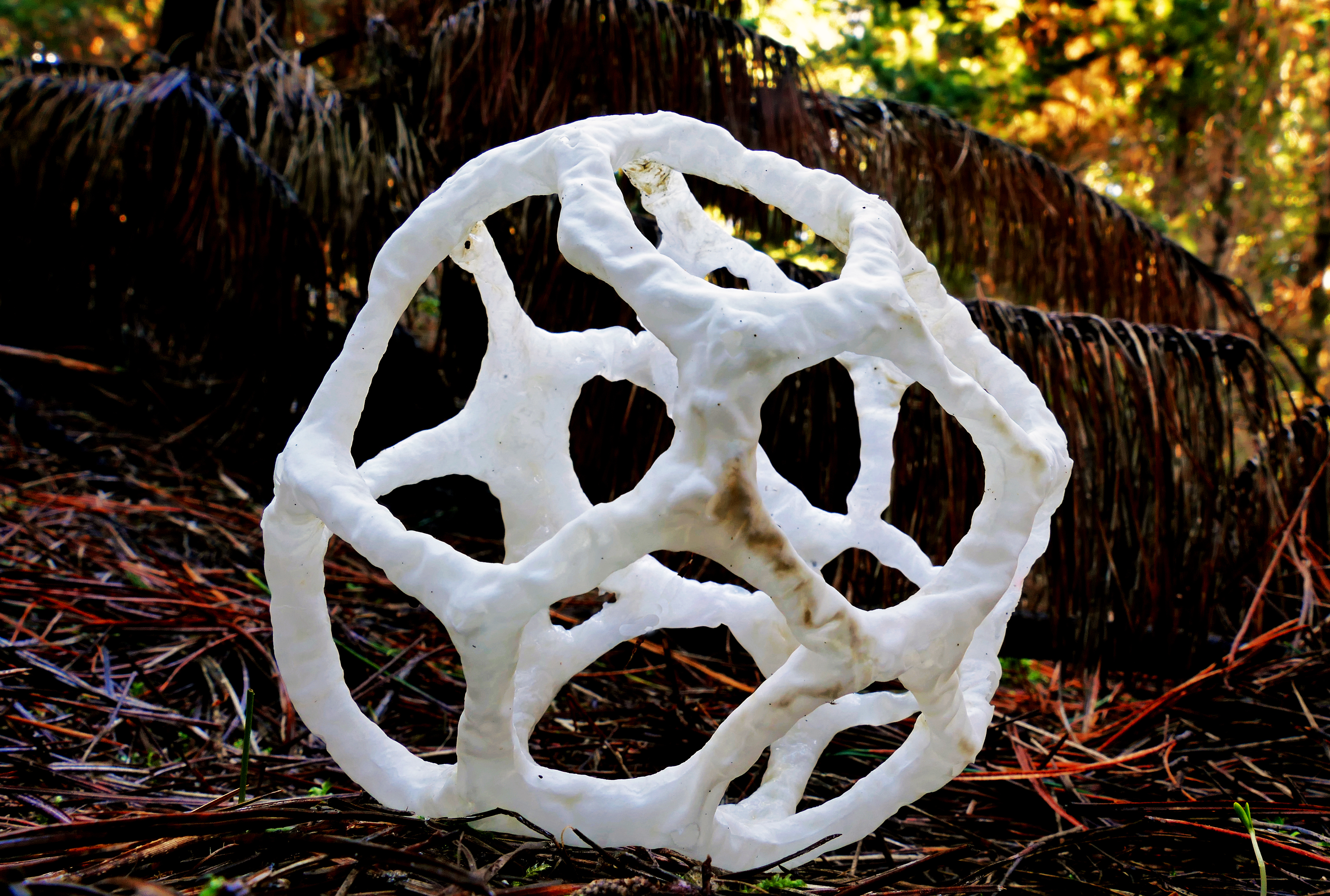
- Ileodictyon cibarium

Scientific classification
- Kingdom: Fungi
- Division: Basidiomycota
- Class: Agaricomycetes
- Order: Phallales
- Family: Phallaceae
- Genus: Ileodictyon; Tul. & C. Tul. (1844)

Type species
- Ileodictyon cibarium Tul. & C. Tul. (1844)

Species
- I. cibarium I. gracile I. giganteum Ileodictyon sp. nov. 'vert de garnierii'

= Ileodictyon =

Genus of fungi

Ileodictyon is a genus of fungi in the family Phallaceae. Basidiocarps (fruit bodies) are clathroid (resembling those in the genus Clathrus), emerging from egg-like peridia and forming spongy "arms" which connect to create a cage-like lattice. The basidiospores on the arms are covered by a foetid slime that attracts flies, the agents of spore dispersal. There are three named species (Ileodictyon cibarium, Ileodictyon giganteum, Ileodictyon gracile), and one currently unnamed. The unnamed species, called "the green cage fungus", is endemic to New Caledonia and is considered globally threatened. It is assessed as "endangered" on The IUCN Red List of Threatened Species.

The genus may have originated in Australia, New Zealand, and the southern Pacific islands, but species have been found worldwide (including Europe), probably as unintentional introductions.
