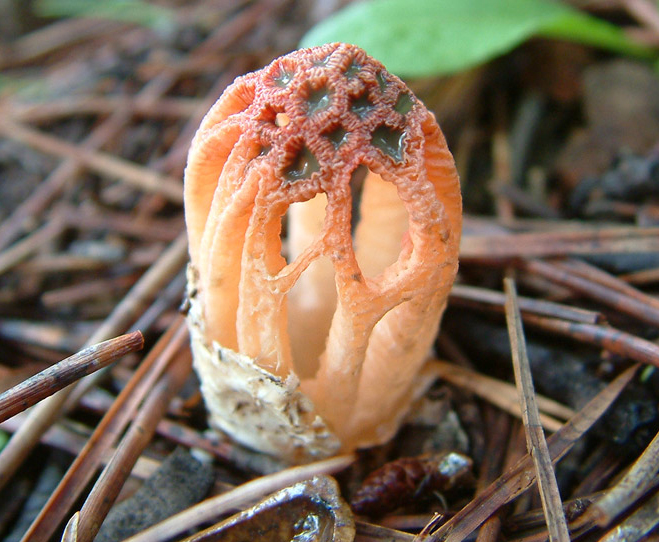
- Colus hirudinosus

Scientific classification
- Kingdom: Fungi
- Division: Basidiomycota
- Class: Agaricomycetes
- Order: Phallales
- Family: Phallaceae
- Genus: Colus; Cavalier & Séchier (1835)

Type species
- Colus hirudinosus Cavalier & Séchier (1835)

Species
- Colus hirudinosus Colus giganteus Colus pusillus Colus stahelii Colus subpusillus

= Colus (fungus) =

Genus of fungi

Colus is a genus of fungi in the family Phallaceae. The genus has a widespread distribution and, according to a 2008 estimate, contains four species.

== Species ==
- Colus giganteus
- Colus hirudinosus
- Colus muelleri
- Colus pusillus
- Colus stahelii
- Colus subpusillus
- Colus treubii
