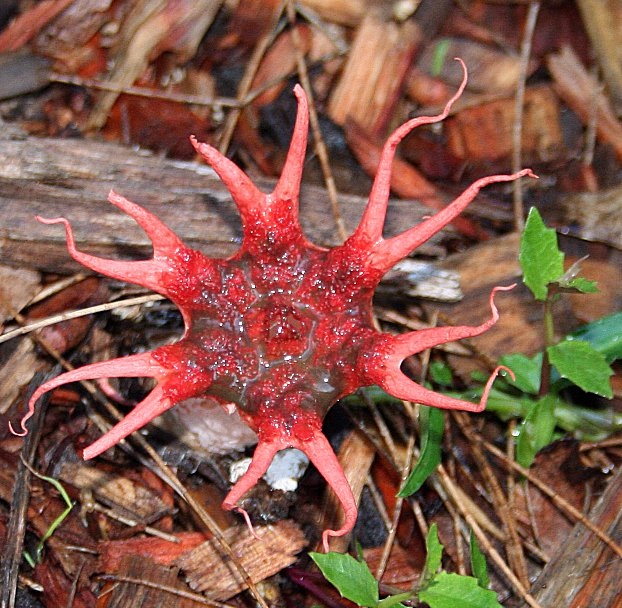
- Aseroe rubra on woodchips, Bomaderry Creek, NSW

Scientific classification
- Kingdom: Fungi
- Division: Basidiomycota
- Class: Agaricomycetes
- Order: Phallales
- Family: Phallaceae
- Genus: Aseroe
- Species: A. rubra

Binomial name
- Aseroe rubra Labill., 1800

= Aseroe rubra =

Species of fungus

Aseroe rubra, commonly known as the anemone stinkhorn, sea anemone fungus and starfish fungus, is a common and widespread basidiomycete fungus recognizable for its foul odour of carrion and its sea anemone shape when mature. Found in gardens on mulch and in grassy areas, it resembles a red star-shaped structure covered in brownish slime called gleba on a white stalk. It attracts flies, which spread its spores.

== Taxonomy ==
The first native Australian fungus to be formally described, Aseroe rubra was collected in 1792 in southern Tasmania and named by the French botanist Jacques Labillardière. The scientific name is derived from the Ancient Greek words Asē/αση 'disgust' and roē/ροη 'juice', and the Latin ruber 'red'. It is a member of the stinkhorn family Phallaceae, although has been placed by some mycologists in a separate family Clathraceae. Like them it bears its spores in a brownish slime which smells of faeces or carrion and attracts flies, which spread the spores.

== Description ==
Aseroe rubra begins as a partly buried whitish egg-shaped structure 3 cm (1 1/4 in) in diameter, which bursts open as a hollow white stalk with reddish arms erupts and grows to a height of 10 cm (3.9 in). It matures into a reddish star-shaped structure with six to ten arms up to 4 cm (1 1/2 in) long radiating from the central area. These arms are bifid (deeply divided into two limbs). The top of the fungus is covered with dark olive-brown slime or gleba, which smells of rotting meat. There is a cup-shaped volva at the base that is the remnants of the original egg.

== Distribution and habitat ==
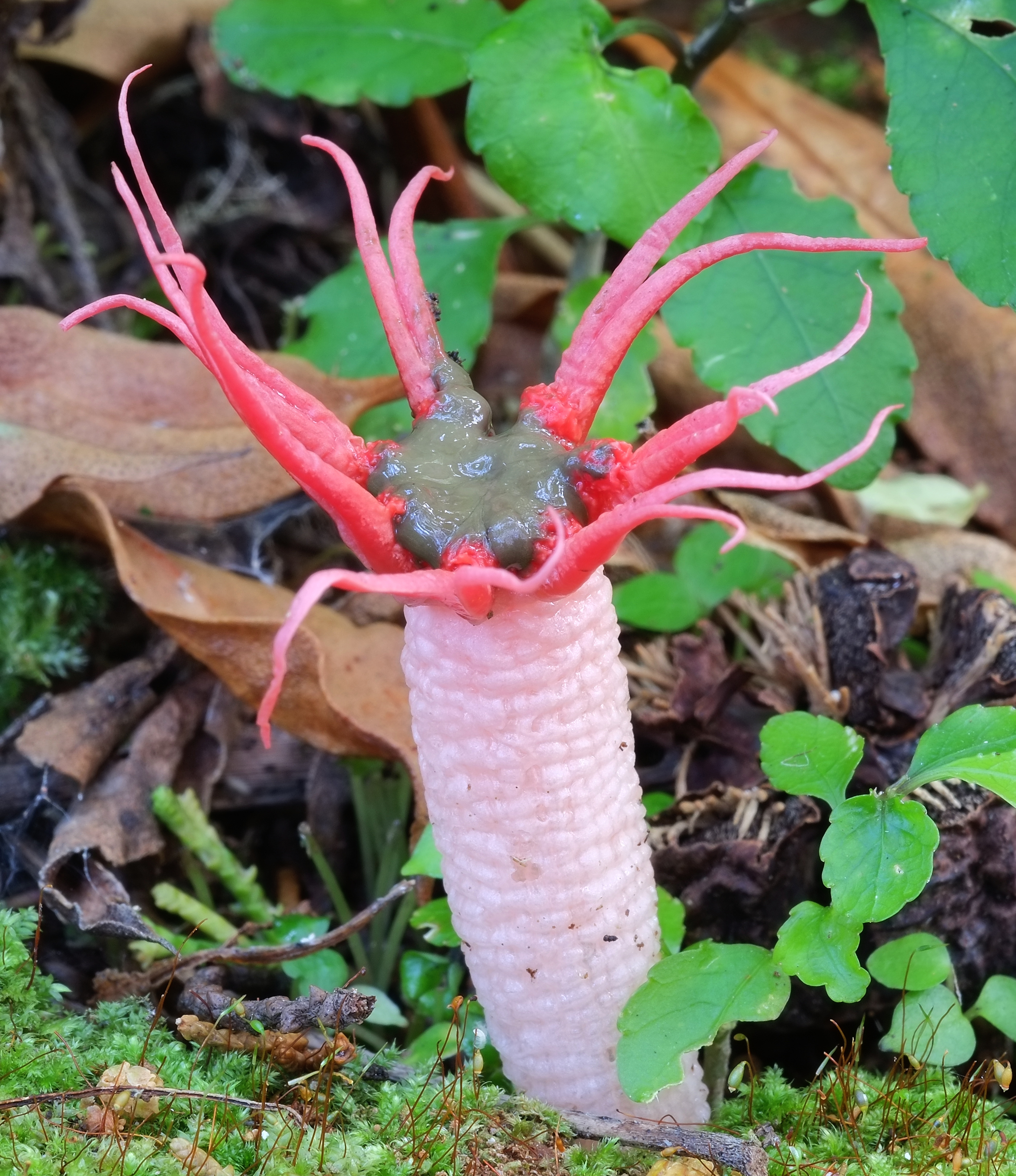
Young specimen 5 centimetres (2 in) tall with brownish gleba

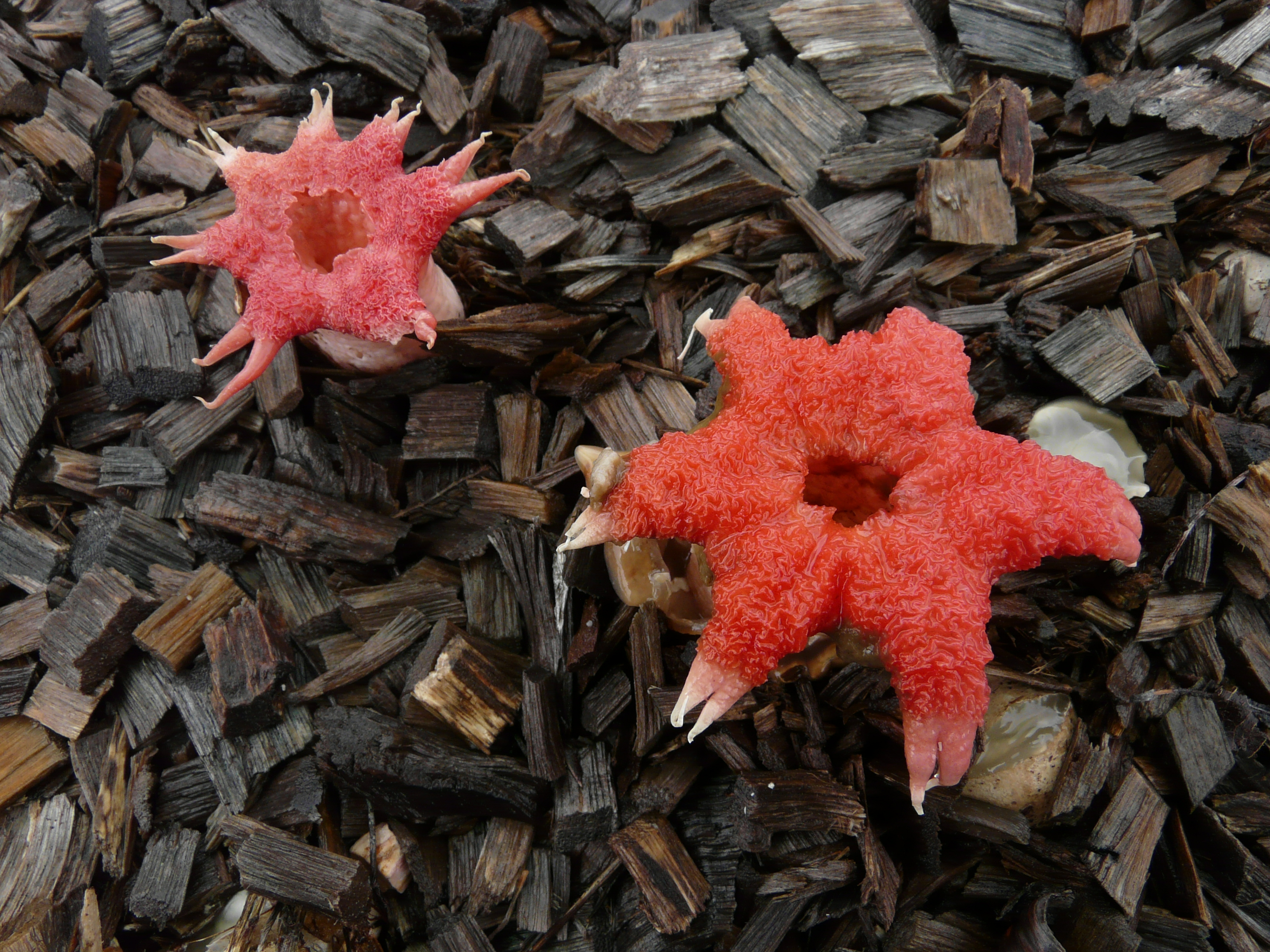
Older specimens with gleba removed

This fairly common fungus is widely distributed in Australia from southeastern Queensland through New South Wales and eastern Victoria and Tasmania. It is also found across many islands in the Pacific Ocean, including New Zealand. A saprotroph, it is found on decomposing plant matter as well as on woodchips and mulch and is common in gardens and amenities plantings. It also occurs in alpine grasslands and woodlands.

From its natural habitat, it appears to have traveled to other parts of the world in garden or soil products; it was recorded growing on soil transported from Australia in a glasshouse in Kew Gardens in 1829 and later in California in North America. Transport in garden or soil products does not explain its presence on remote and uninhabited Pacific islands nor its occurrence in South Africa, Kangaita, and Kirinyaga (a small village in Kenya) in localities remote from any garden. These unexplained localities cast doubt on the assumption that the species was spread from Australia and New Zealand by humans. Recently, A. rubra var. zeylanica which differ in size (3-4.5 cm diam.) and salmon pink to reddish-orange unbranched arms or tentacles, has been reported from the Western Ghats, Kerala, India. This fungus is distributed in the semi-evergreen to evergreen forests and Eucalyptus stands at high ranges.

== In Māori culture ==
Aseroe rubra is known as puapua-a-Autahi in Māori, or the "blossom of Canopus", a name which refers to the fact that the fungus is seen typically after Canopus rises in New Zealand. While the fungus is a traditional food in Māori culture, only young specimens can be harvested, and the fruiting body is cooked for extended periods of time, to remove toxins.
