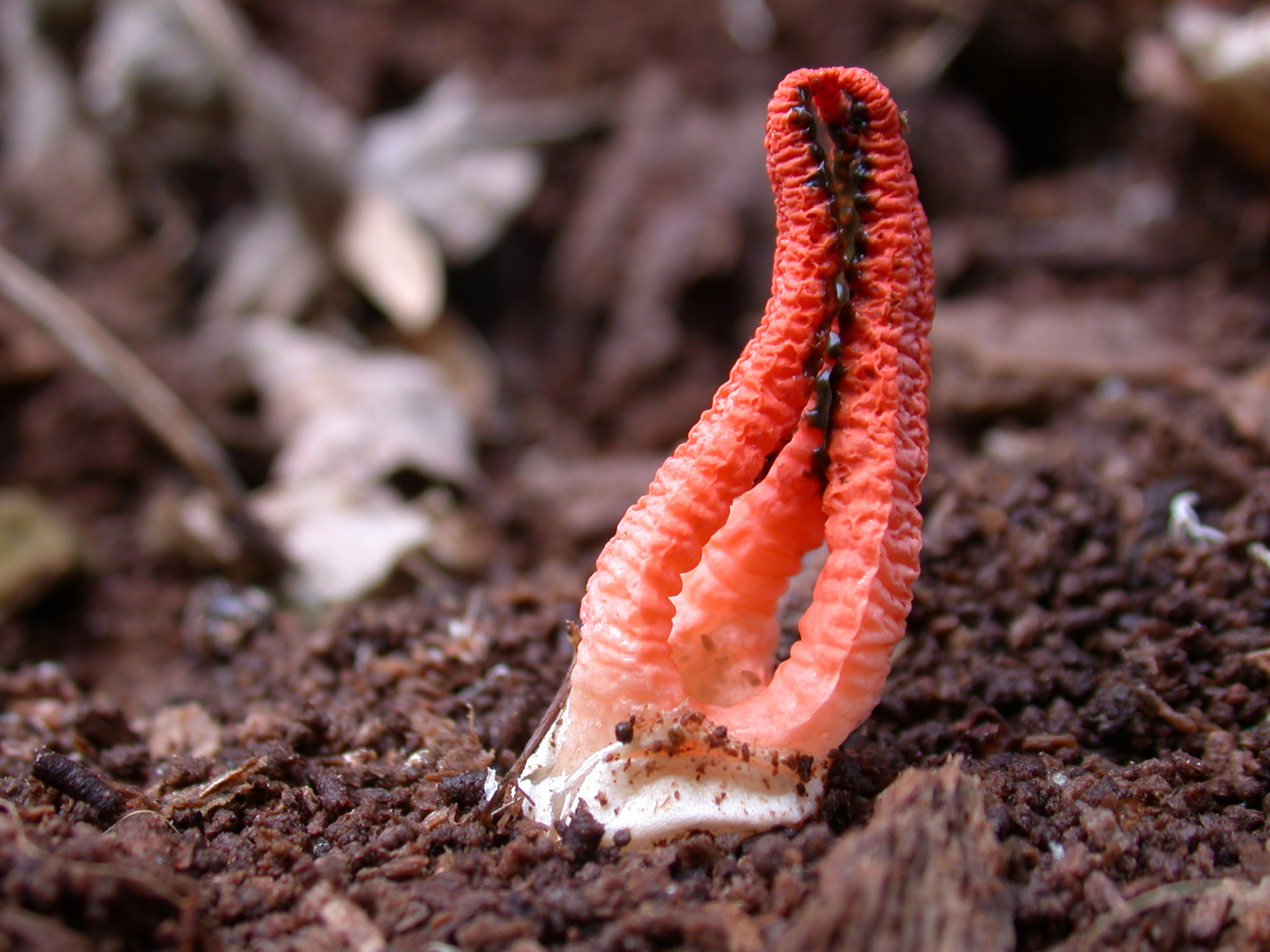
- Pseudocolus fusiformis

Scientific classification
- Kingdom: Fungi
- Division: Basidiomycota
- Class: Agaricomycetes
- Order: Phallales
- Family: Phallaceae
- Genus: Pseudocolus; Lloyd (1907)

Type species
- Pseudocolus fusiformis Lloyd (1909)

Species
- See text

= Pseudocolus =

Genus of fungi

Pseudocolus is a genus of fungi in the stinkhorn family. The fruit bodies have three or four simple arms that are initially joined at the tip, but often break apart. The tips of the arms are covered with a slimy, foul-smelling gleba, which attracts insects that help disperse the spores. The genus contains three species: the type Pseudocolus fusiformis, P. garciae, similar in appearance to the type but with a pinkish to red, rather than orange color, and P. grandis, found in India.

== Taxonomy ==
The first appearance of the type species, Pseudocolus fusiformis, in the literature was in 1890, under the name Colus fusiformis, when Eduard Fischer wrote a description based on a painting he found in the Paris Museum of Natural History. In his 1944 monograph on the Gasteromycetes of Australia and New Zealand, Gordon Herriot Cunningham considered this naming to be a nomen nudum—not published with an adequate description. However, it was valid under the rules of the International Code of Botanical Nomenclature. In 1899 Penzig described the species Colus javanicus based on a single specimen found on Java, and a year later Fischer amended the name of his original Colus fusiformis to Colus javanicus, as he was not satisfied with the quality of his original description. Despite his doubts on the validity of his description, his original naming is both legitimate and has priority over C. javanicus.

In 1907, Curtis Gates Lloyd described the new genus Pseudocolus, and reduced several species to synonyms of Pseudocolus fusiformis.

== Description ==
The fruit body consists of a flaring, short stipe surmounted by unbranched columns that bear the gleba and are normally united at the apex, occasionally becoming free. The tissue of the receptacle has a tubular structure.

== Species ==
Several species described as Pseudocolus have been reduced to synonymy with P. fusiformis, while others are poorly known and have been seldom reported in the literature since their original descriptions.

- Pseudocolus archeri (Berk.) Lloyd (1913)

Originally described in 1860 by Miles Joseph Berkeley as Lysurus archeri , this name is one of many synonyms now lumped under Clathrus archeri (Berk.) Dring (1980)

- Pseudocolus fusiformis (E.Fisch.) Lloyd (1909)

Originally Colus fusiformis E.Fisch.

- Pseudocolus garciae (Möller) Lloyd (1907)
- Pseudocolus grandis J.A. Sáenz, Rawla & R. Sharma (1982)
- Pseudocolus jaczewskii Woronow (1918)

Described in 1918 from specimens collected by Voronoc in South Colchis; synonymous with P. fusiformis

- Pseudocolus javanicus (Penz.) Lloyd (1907)
- Pseudocolus mauritianus Lloyd (1917)
- Pseudocolus rothae (Lloyd) Yasuda (1916)
- Pseudocolus rothae Lloyd (1907)
- Pseudocolus schellenbergiae (Sumst.) Johnson (1929)

== Distribution ==
Pseudocolis fusiformis is known from east Asia and Indonesia, Australia and New Zealand, and southern Africa, and has been introduced to the United States. P. garciae is found in North America and South America. P. grandis is found in both northern and southern India.
