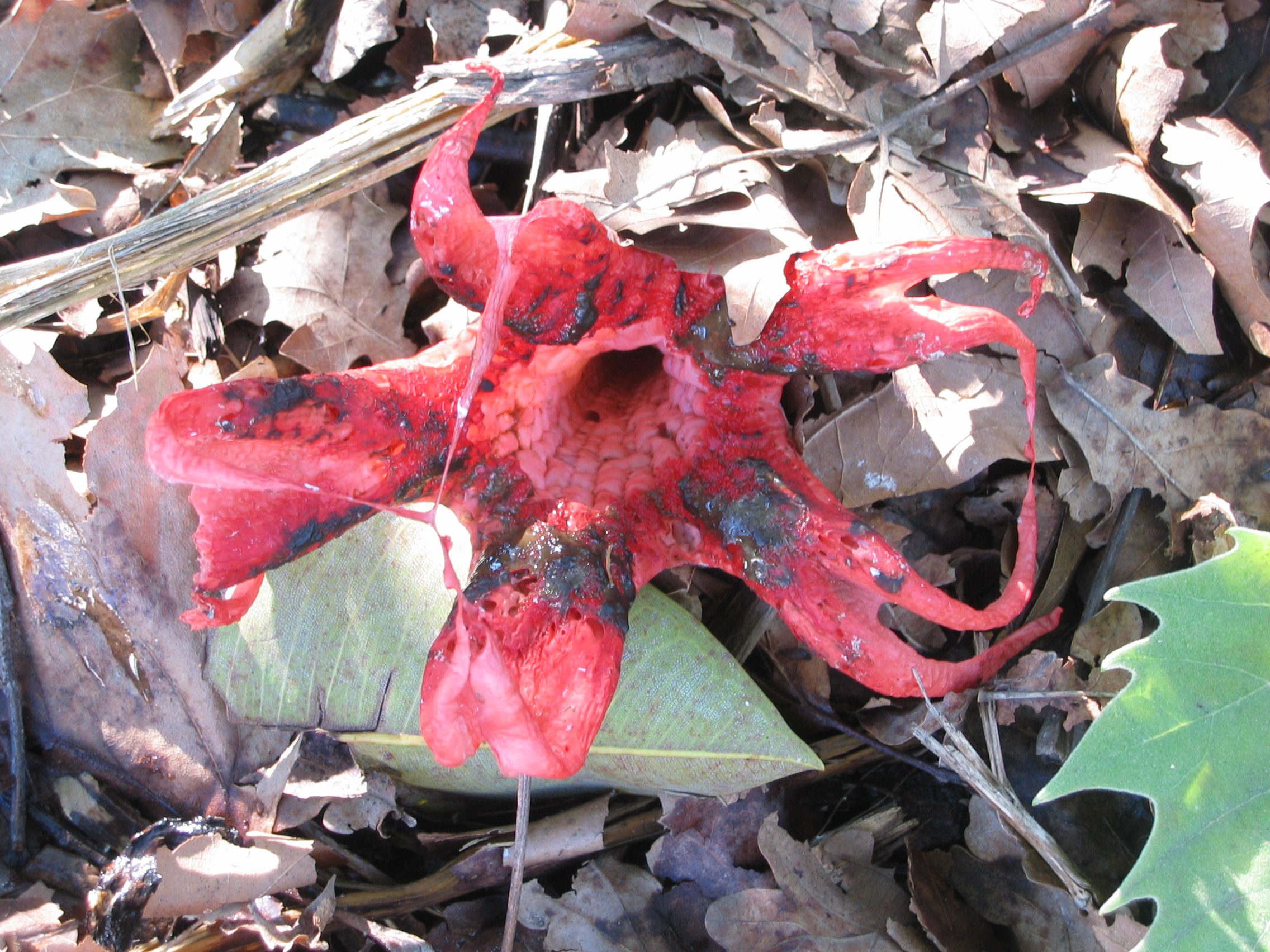
- Aseroe rubra

Scientific classification
- Kingdom: Fungi
- Division: Basidiomycota
- Class: Agaricomycetes
- Order: Phallales
- Family: Phallaceae
- Genus: Aseroe; Labill. (1800)

Type species
- Aseroe rubra Labill. (1800)

Species
- Aseroe coccinea Aseroe genovefae Aseroe rubra

= Aseroe =

Genus of fungi

Aseroe is a small genus of basidiomycete fungi of the family Phallaceae, though sometimes placed in the separate family Clathraceae. The genus name is derived from the Ancient Greek words Asē/αση 'disgust' and roē/ροη 'juice'. The genus was described with the collection and description of the type species Aseroe rubra in 1800 by French botanist Jacques Labillardière. As with other stinkhorn-like fungi, mature fruiting bodies are covered with olive-brown slime, containing spores, which attracts flies. These fungi are common in mulch and are saprobic.

== Species ==
As of August 2022, Species Fungorum accepted 3 species of Aseroe.(needs updating - seems to list 7 accepted species oct 2026).

- Aseroe coccinea
- Aseroe genovefae
- Aseroe rubra
