= Anthurus =

Scientific classification
- Kingdom: Fungi
- Division: Basidiomycota
- Class: Agaricomycetes
- Order: Phallales
- Family: Phallaceae
- Genus: Anthurus; Kalchbr. & MacOwan (1880)

Genus of fungi

Anthurus is a genus of fungi in the family Phallaceae.

== Species ==
As of August 2022, Species Fungorum accepted 4 species of Anthurus:

- Anthurus brownii
- Anthurus macowanii
- Anthurus muellerianus
- Anthurus surinamensis
