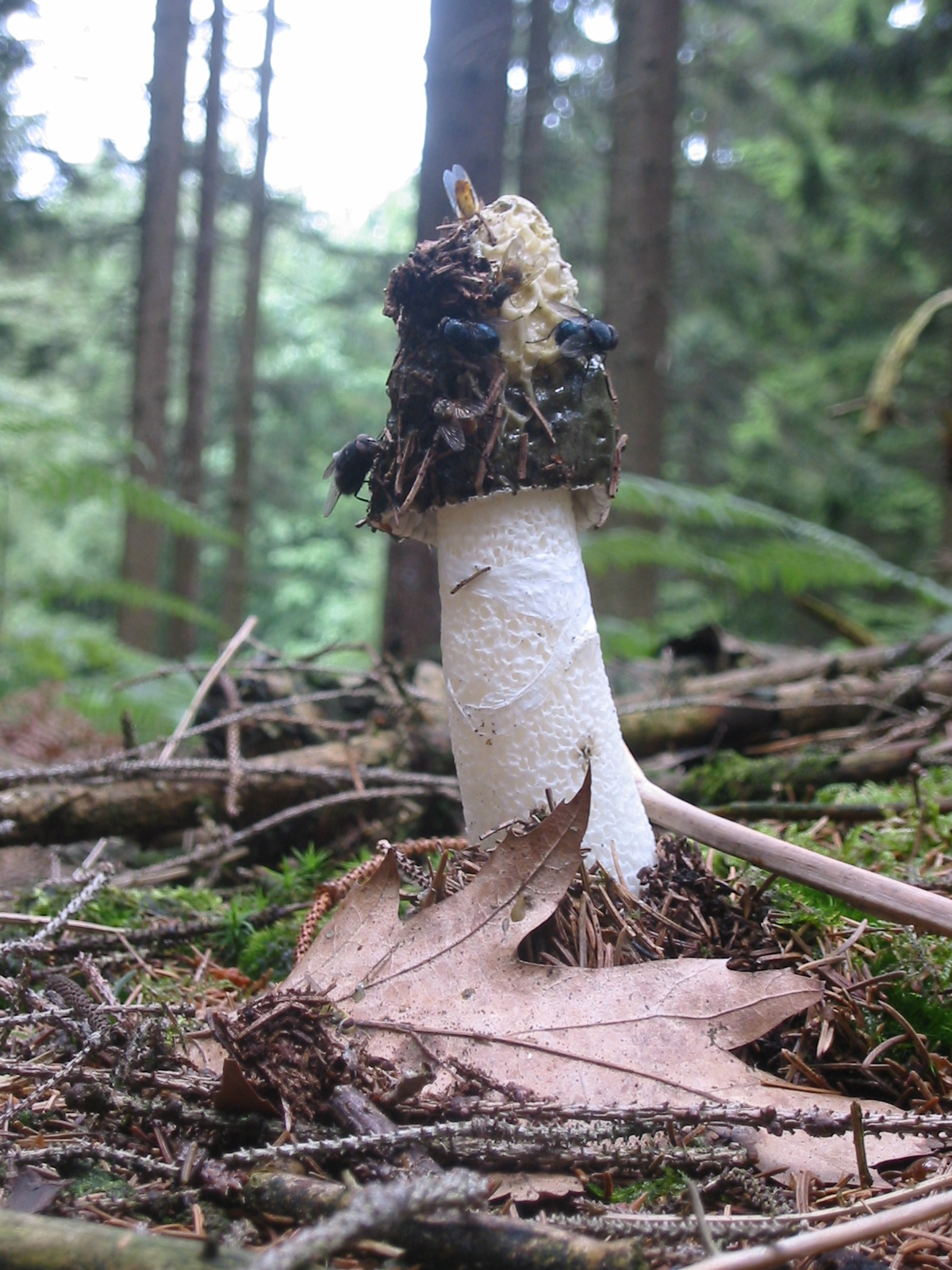
- The common stinkhorn, Phallus impudicus

Scientific classification
- Kingdom: Fungi
- Division: Basidiomycota
- Class: Agaricomycetes
- Order: Phallales
- Family: Phallaceae; Corda (1842)

Type genus
- Phallus Junius ex L. (1753)

Synonyms
- Clathraceae Chevall. 1826; Lysuraceae Corda 1842

= Phallaceae =

Family of fungi

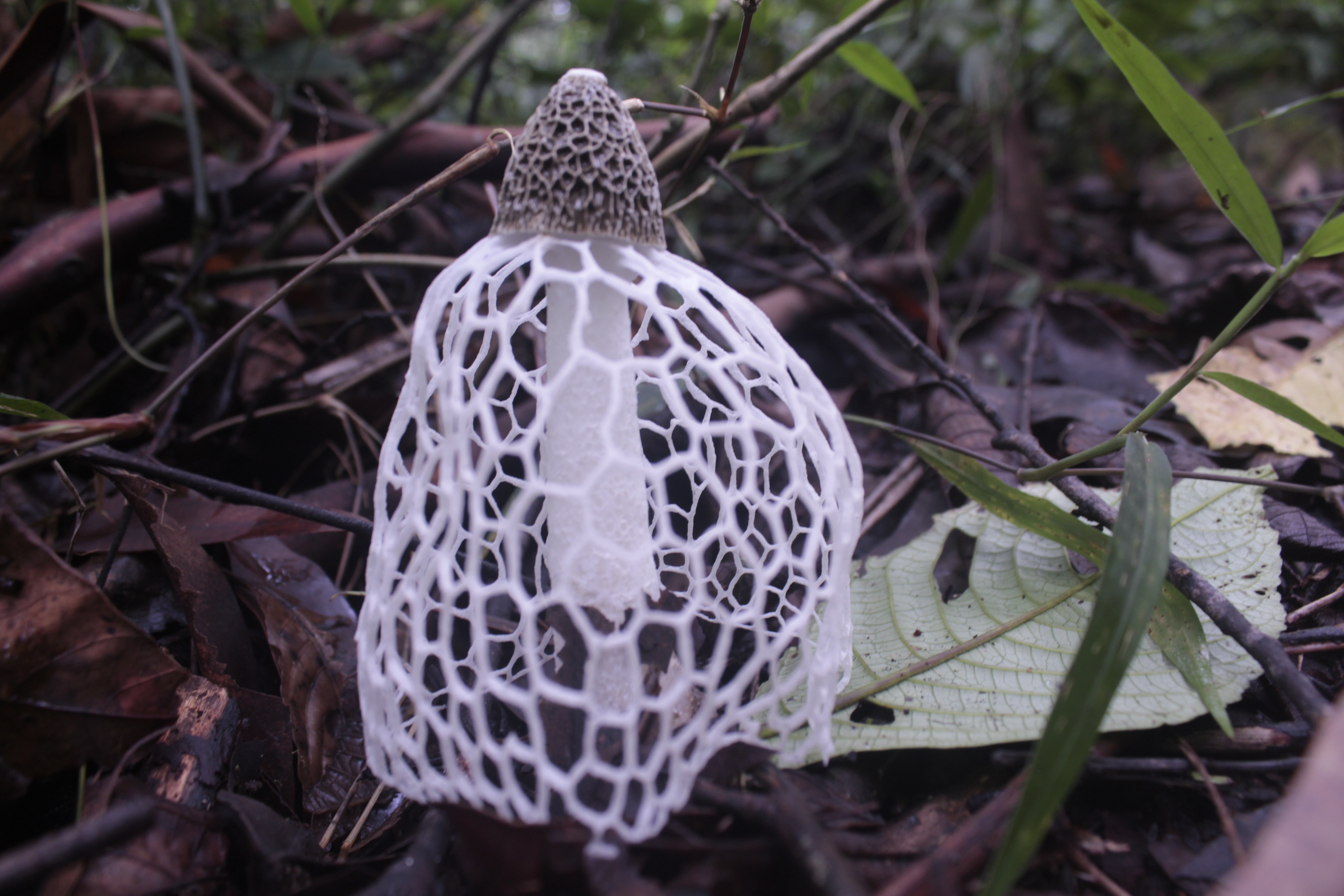
Fresh stinkhorn mushroom

The Phallaceae are a family of fungi, commonly known as stinkhorns, within the order Phallales. Stinkhorns have a worldwide distribution, but are especially prevalent in tropical regions. They are known for their foul-smelling, sticky spore masses, or gleba, borne on the end of a stalk called the receptaculum. The characteristic fruiting-body structure, a single, unbranched receptaculum with an externally attached gleba on the upper part, distinguishes Phallaceae from other families in the Phallales. The spore mass typically smells of carrion or dung, and attracts flies, beetles and other insects to help disperse the spores. Although there is great diversity in body structure shape among the various genera, all species in the Phallaceae begin their development as oval or round structures known as "eggs". The appearance of Phallaceae is often sudden, as gleba can erupt from the underground egg and burst open within an hour. According to a 2008 estimate, the family contains 21 genera and 77 species.

== Description ==
Species of stinkhorns have gasteroid, or internally produced, spores. Fruiting bodies originate as a gelatinous, spherical, or egg-shaped structure that may be completely or partially buried underground. The peridium, the outer layer of the egg, is white, or purple/red, with two or three layers. The outer layer is thin, membranous, and elastic, while the inner layer is thicker, gelatinous, and continuous. At maturity, the peridium opens up and remains as a volva at the base of the receptaculum.

This porous mushroom is among the fastest growing in the world, extending by 5 mm per minute, so fast that a crackling sound can be heard. Technically it is not really growing, as it uses a form of cellular origami to increase its size by absorbing water.

The fertile portion of the fruiting body is often borne on the end of a wide, fleshy or spongy stalk (as in the Phallales), which may be cylindrical, star-shaped, or reticulate (forming a network). They may be brightly colored, sometimes with a lattice- or veil-like membrane enclosing and protecting the spores. The spore-containing substance, the gleba, is typically gelatinous, often foul-smelling, and deliquescent (becoming liquid from the absorption of water). The gleba is formed on the exterior face of the cap or the upper part of the receptacle.

The basidia are small and narrowly club-shaped or fusiform, short-lived (evanescent), with four to eight sterigmata. The spores are usually ellipsoid or cylindrical in shape, hyaline or pale brown, smooth, more or less smooth-walled, and truncated at the base.

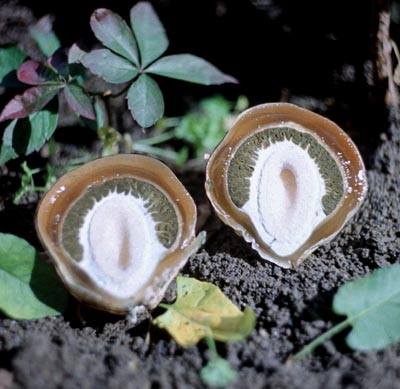
A bisected stinkhorn egg (Phallus impudicus)

The gelatinous layer of the stinkhorn (Clathrus ruber) contains high concentrations of potassium, calcium, manganese, and iron. A moderate amount of calcium is found in the receptacle and gleba as well as a high amount of manganese is also found in the gleba. Retaining a high potassium concentration is important for the growth of the stem of the fruiting body called the carpophore, where potassium plays a key component in regulating osmotic pressure. This osmotic pressure helps maintain the shape of the carpophore. The calcium found in the gelatinous layer contributes to the slimy characteristics of the gel and protects the carpophore during growth. The strong adhesive gelatinous layer consists of polysaccharides that are formed by the sequestration of calcium ions. The high manganese and iron concentrations in the gelatinous layer and gleba are theorized to produce enzymes that produce sugars and odorous compounds that play a role in attracting insects.

Stinkhorns are edible, but only at the egg stage when the smell is less strong. The inner layer can be cut out with a knife and eaten raw – it is crisp and crunchy with a radish-like taste.

The mushrooms also contain several pharmaceutical compounds with potential for cancer treatment.

== Genera ==
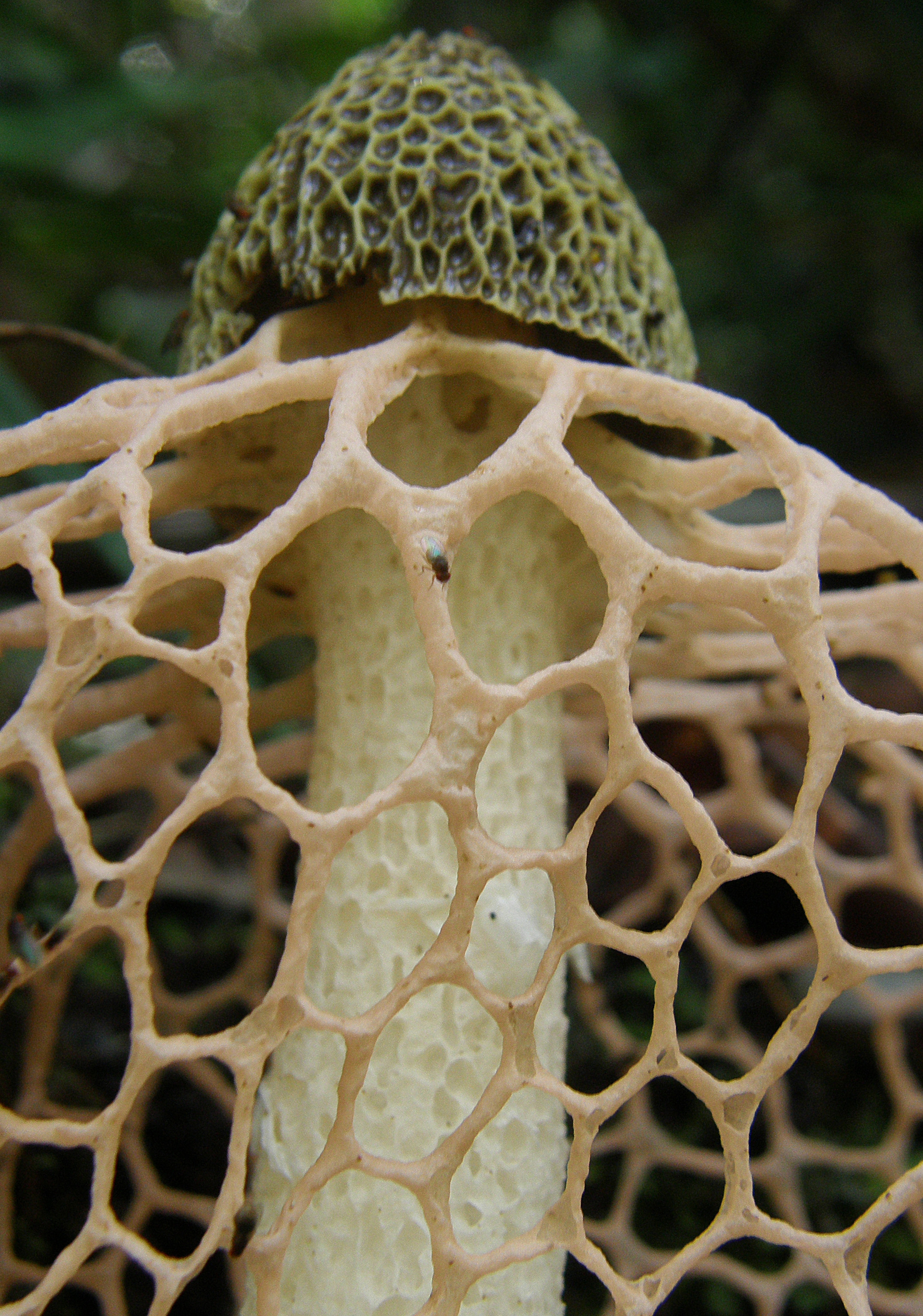
Bridal veil stinkhorn (Phallus indusiatus)

Anthurus Kalchbr. & MacOwan (1880)
Fruiting bodies have a short stalk from which arises a spore-bearing structure (the receptaculum) of 5–8 arched arms. These arms, initially joined at the top, disconnect and curve irregularly to expose the inner surface of each arm, which is covered with green spore-containing gleba. Spores are 3–4 × 1–1.5 μm.
Aporophallus Möller (1895)
Aseroë Labill. (1800)

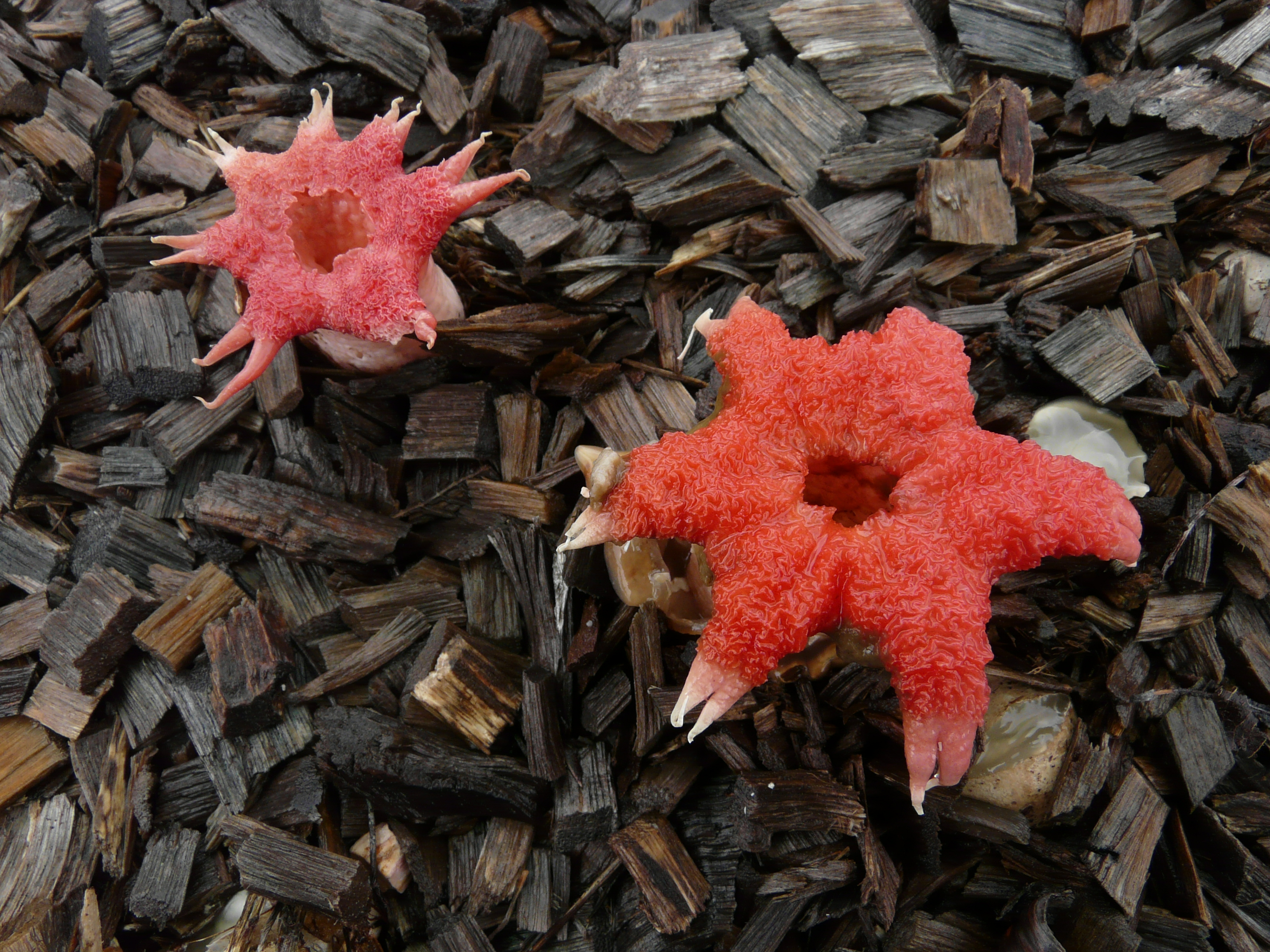
Aseroë rubra

Mature fruiting bodies contain a roughly cylindrical white or pinkish stalk approximately 6 × 2 cm, with a volva at the base. At the top is a bright red disc with a variable number of arms, typically 3–7 cm long. The gleba found on the disc and inner side of the arms is slimy, foetid, and green colored. Spores are hyaline, with dimensions of 4–6 1.5–2 μm. Aseroë rubra, an Australian and Pacific species which has spread to Europe and North America.
Blumenavia Möller (1895)
Clathrus P. Micheli ex L. (1753)

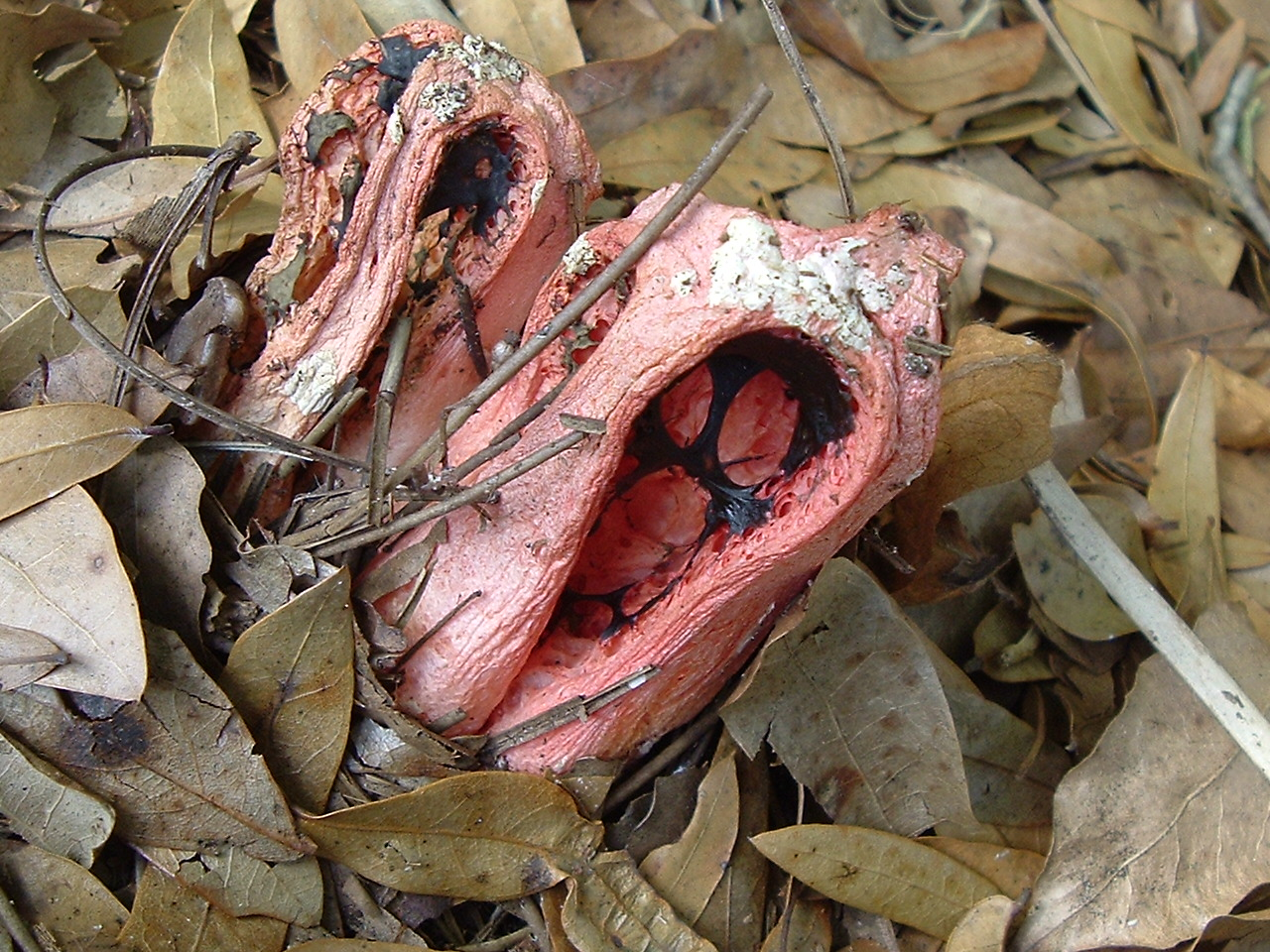
Clathrus columnatus

Fruiting bodies are latticed (clathrate), and made of hollow tubular arms that originate from the basal tissue within the volva. Spores are elliptical, smooth, hyaline, with dimensions of 4–6 ×1.5–2.5 μm. Examples include Clathrus ruber, the lattice stinkhorn, Clathrus archeri, the octopus stinkhorn, and Clathrus columnatus, the columned stinkhorn.
Colus Cavalier & Séchier (1835)
A genus of four species with fruit bodies that are a short stalk from which six columns arise, joining at the top to form a red, arching, clathrate receptaculum. The gleba is smeared on the inside surface of the receptaculum.
Echinophallus Henn. (1898)
Endophallus Zang & Petersen (1989)
Contains a single species, E. yunnanensis found in China, that resembles Phallus except for a peridium that is separated from the base of the stem and which does not persist as a volva.
Ileodictyon Tul. ex M. Raoul (1844)
Fruiting bodies are latticed (clathrate), and have gelatinous arms that lie sessile within the volva. Spores are elliptical, and have dimensions of 4–6 1.5–2.5 μm. The New Zealand native, Ileodictyon cibarium, known as the basket fungus, has a fruiting body shaped somewhat like a round or oval ball with interlaced or latticed branches.
Itajahya Möller (1895)
Characters in this genus include a white calyptra (tissue which covers the top of the fruiting body to which the gleba is attached), lamellate plates covered with gleba. The gleba has a white mottled surface, and the pileus appears wig-like when removed of the gleba. The thick, stout stalk has many chambered walls.
Kobayasia (Kobayasi) S. Imai & A. Kawam. (1958)
This genus circumscribes the single species Kobayasia nipponica, found in Japan in 1958.
Laternea Turpin (1822)

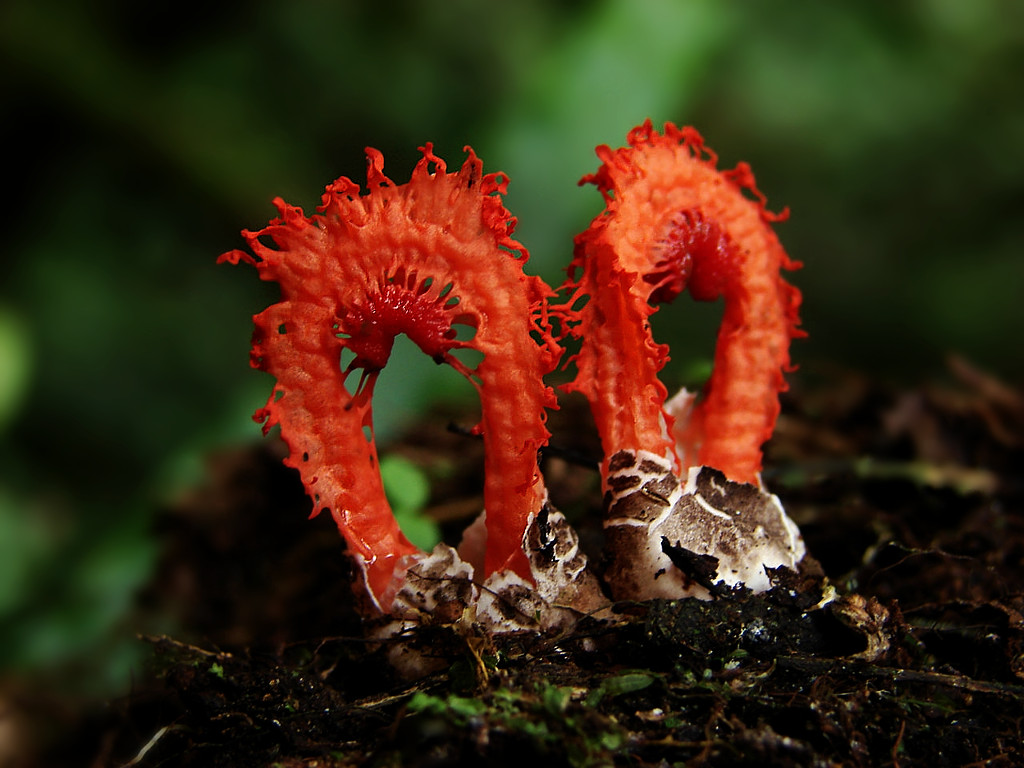
Laternea pusilla

Ligiella J.A. Sáenz (1980)
Fruiting bodies are 4.5–6.5 cm long, 2.2–5 cm in diameter, and have four or five thick white chambered arms that are joined at the top, but free at the base. This monotypic genus, containing the single species L. rodrigueziana, is known only from Costa Rica.
Lysurus Fr. (1823)

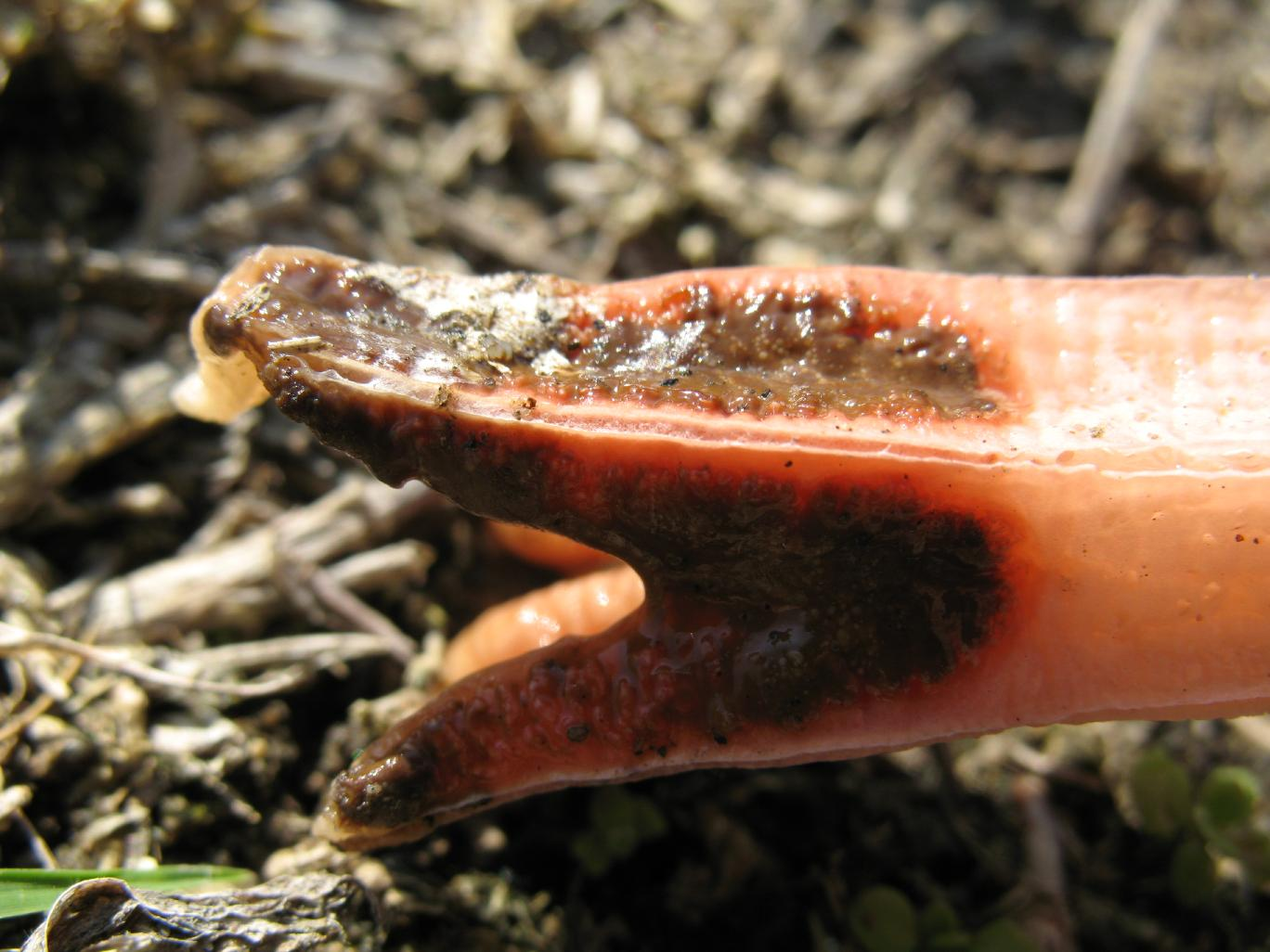
Lysurus mokusin

Fruiting bodies consist of a long stalk with 3 or 4 short, thick arms. These arms, initially joined together, but usually separate at maturity, are covered with the brownish-olivaceous gleba. Spores are ellipsoidal, with dimensions of 4–5 × 1.5–2 μm.
Mutinus (Huds.) Fr. (1849)
The mature fruiting body has a spongy, cylindrical hollow stalk which ends in a slender, tapered, sometimes curved head covered with the dark olivaceous, slimy gleba. In older specimens, the gleba may be washed or worn off to show the orange or red color of the head itself. Notable species include the dog stinkhorn Mutinus caninus.
Neolysurus O.K. Mill., Ovrebo & Burk (1991)
This genus contains the single species Neolysurus arcipulvinus, described from Costa Rica. The stipe and arms have a tubular construction, similar to species from Lysurus. Neolysurus is unique in having a long stipe, ending in arms or columns that branch and interconnect to support a cushion-shaped, olive green gleba. The glebal cushion is divided into polygonal compartments by a fine pinkish white, solid mesh. The hymenium is continuous between the mesh.
Phallus Junius ex L. (1753)
In species of Phallus, the receptaculum is a tall unbranched stalk that ends in a cap-like structure that bears the gleba. Notable species include Phallus impudicus, the common stinkhorn, Phallus hadriani, Phallus ravenelii, and Phallus indusiatus (syn. Dictyophora indusiata), the Chinese "bamboo fungus", eaten as a food in southwestern China after the foul smelling cap is removed.
Protubera Möller (1895)
Fruiting bodies are egg-shaped, 2.2–3.5 cm in diameter by 3–4 cm high, with a dull white, soft exoperidium (roughly 1 mm thick) and a grayish exoperidium (3–4 mm thick). The gleba is contained within internal chambers that are separated by whitish, gelatinous tissue that originates from a columella-like, gelatinous central core. Spores are elliptical, smooth, nearly hyaline, and 3.5–4.5 1.5–2 μm.
Protuberella (S. Imai) S. Imai & Kawam. (1958)
This genus resembles the Protubera, except that the tissue is "gelatinous fleshy in the peridium and not so distinctly gelatinous as in Protubera maracuja, they are less gelatinous in the nature of the sterile strands than those of P. maracuja". Spores are clylindric, thin-walled, and 3.7–5 2–2.5 μm. This monotypic genus contains the single species Protuberella borealis, known only from Asia.
Pseudoclathrus B. Liu & Y.S. Bau (1980)
Pseudocolus Lloyd (1907)
Staheliomyces E. Fisch. (1921)

== Volatile compounds ==
The number and type of volatile compounds produced by stinkhorn mushrooms changes throughout its life course. When the stinkhorn is still in its egg stage, the total amount of volatile substances is relatively low. The sulfuric odorous compounds (that attract insects) is absent. During this stage the mushroom’s veil covers up the slime covered cap that contains the spores. When the stinkhorn grows into a more mature-fruit body, there are over twenty-two volatile compounds found in the mature-fruit bodies including dimethyl oligosulfides, and various alkaloids and terpenoids that act as insect attractants. In an over-ripe stinkhorn, forty-one volatile components are present, many of which also act as insect attractants. Dimethyl oligosulfides are not as commonly found in over-ripe fruit as they were in the mature fruit bodies since many of the insects already carried the smelly slime away.

The stinkhorn contains compounds of carrion, such as oligosulfides, and of feces, such as phenol, indole and p-cresol. This provides evidence for mimicry of carrion and feces and convergence in the putrid scents of fungus. The stinkhorn’s scent is similar to that of rotten meat and dog feces. This scent profile supports the assumption that the stinkhorn mimics fly brood sites and food sources. The flies are being lured in by the exploitation of their innate attraction to smell of the decaying animal matter that the stinkhorn gives off.
