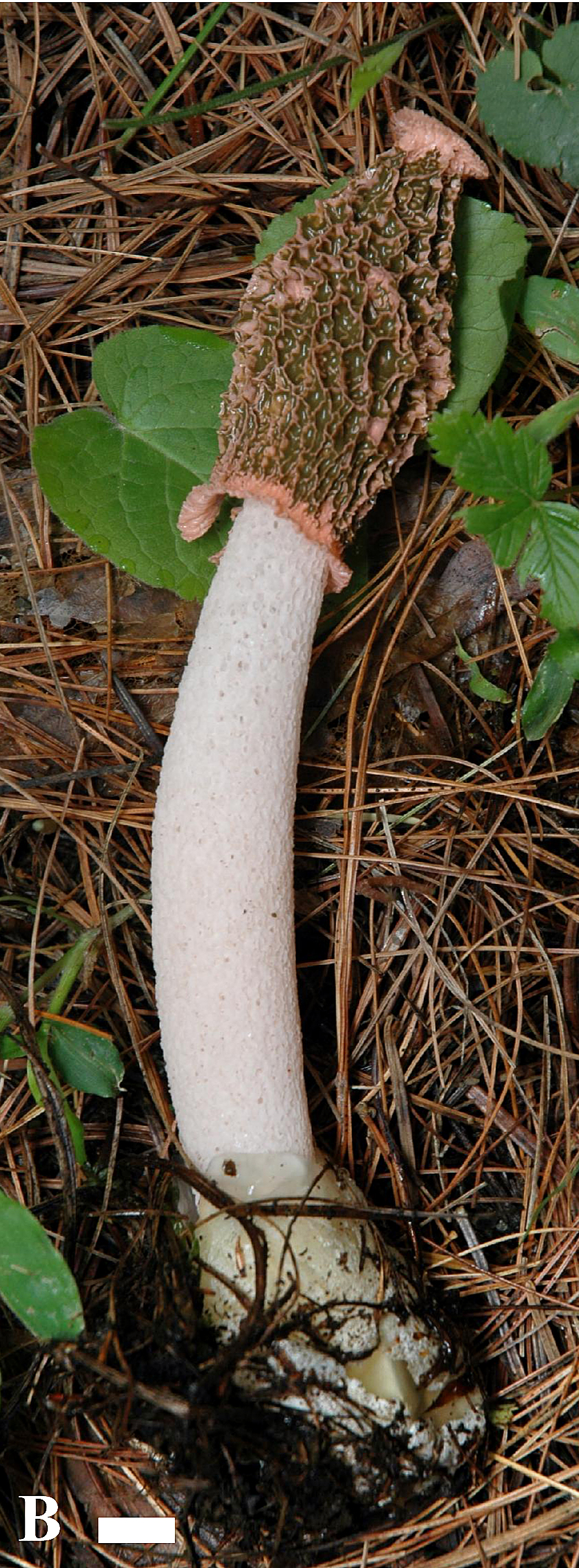
- Scale bar=1 cm

Scientific classification
- Kingdom: Fungi
- Division: Basidiomycota
- Class: Agaricomycetes
- Order: Phallales
- Family: Phallaceae
- Genus: Phallus
- Species: P. calongei

Binomial name
- Phallus calongei G. Moreno & Khalid
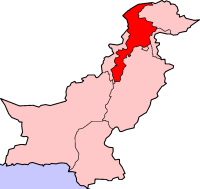
- Known only from Khyber Pakhtunkhwa (dark red), Pakistan

= Phallus calongei =

Stinkhorn fungus from Pakistan

Phallus calongei (Calonge's Stinkhorn) is a species of stinkhorn mushroom. Found in Pakistan, it was described as new to science in 2009. Starting out as an "egg", the fully expanded fruit body consists of a single, thick, stipe with a cap attached to the apex and covered with olive-green, slimy spore-containing gleba. It is distinguished from other similar Phallus species by a combination of features, including a pinkish, reticulated (network-like) cap, and a stipe that is tapered at both ends. The edibility of the mushroom is unknown.

== Systematics ==
Phallus calongei was discovered on June 16, 2008, near the Khanspur stream in Khyber Pakhtunkhwa (formerly known as the North Western Frontier Province) in Pakistan. It was described as new to science in a 2009 Mycotaxon publication. The specific epithet calongei honors Spanish mycologist Francisco D. Calonge who has written extensively on the Gasteromycetes, and who has himself published or co-published three Phallus species: P. atrovolvatus (Kreisel & Calonge), P. maderensis (Calonge) and P. minusculus (Kreisel & Calonge). P. calongei is one of four Phallus species known to exist in Pakistan, the others being P. celebicus, P. impudicus, and P. rubicundus.

According to the infrageneric classification scheme proposed by German mycologist Hanns Kreisel in 1996, Phallus calongei belongs in the subgenus Phallus, section Flavophallus of the genus Phallus. Other species in this section include P. flavocostatus, P. tenuis, P. formanosus, P. calichrous, P. multicolor, and P. cinnabarinus. A number of features distinguish P. calongei from these, including: an undeveloped white volva, a stipe tapered at both ends, a deeply pitted and reticulate cap surface with pinkish ridges, and no indusium (a lacy "skirt" hanging from the cap, present in some Phallus species).

== Description ==
As a member of the genus Phallus, the shape of P. calongei mushrooms assume the general form of a phallus (an erect human penis) with a single elongated hollow stipe topped by a bulbous cap-like structure at the apex. The fruit bodies of P. calongei start out appearing similar to whitish "eggs", with a membranous exoperidium (outer tissue layer) and gelatinous, translucent endoperidium (inner tissue layer). The exoperidium remains at the base of the fruit body as a thin, membranous, undeveloped white volva.

The fully expanded fruit body consists of a single, thick, stalk with a ridged and pitted cap attached to the apex; the cap is covered with olive-green, slimy gleba. The fruit body can reach up to 24 centimetres (9 1/2 inches) tall and 3 cm (1 1/8 in) thick. It is whitish and hollow, slightly tapered at both ends, and has a wall that consists of layers of perforated chambers. At the apex of the stalk is the "cap", which can be up to 7 cm (2 3/4 in) high and 4 cm (1 5/8 in) thick. It is bell-shaped to conical-truncate with a pitted surface. As the gleba dissipates, the cap surface becomes strongly reticulated—forming a network of raised pinkish ridges. The tip of the cap is truncated, with a depressed and perforated surface. The gleba is olive-green, fetid, and deliquescent (melting away gradually).

The spores are ellipsoid, smooth, and hyaline (translucent), measuring 3.5–4.5 by 1.5–2.0 μm. The edibility of the mushroom has not been determined.

=== Similar species ===
The only other Phallus species known with a pinkish-colored cap is P. rubicundus; its conical cap has a surface that is wrinkled, not reticulate. Other similar species include P. hadriani, which has a purple volva, P. macrosporus, which has a reddish volva, and P. formanosus, which has a pale pink stipe and volva.

== Habitat and distribution ==
P. calongei is known only from the type locality in Pakistan, where it was found growing on the ground at 2,575 metres (8,448 ft) above sea level. All species of Phallus are known to be saprobic, feeding off dead and decaying organic matter.
