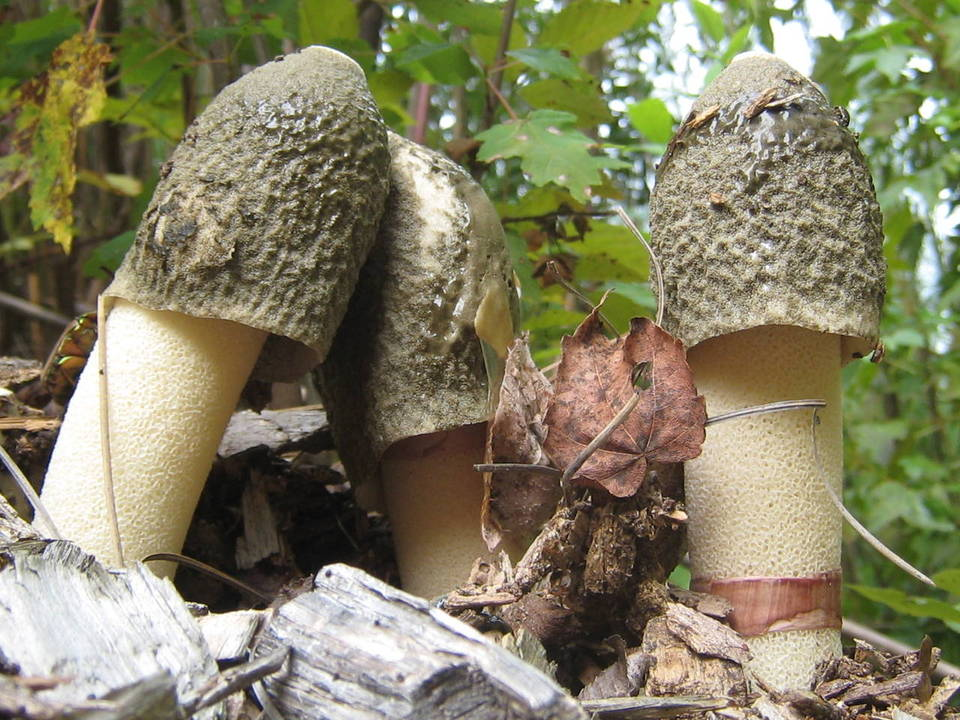

Scientific classification
- Kingdom: Fungi
- Division: Basidiomycota
- Class: Agaricomycetes
- Order: Phallales
- Family: Phallaceae
- Genus: Phallus
- Species: P. ravenelii

Binomial name
- Phallus ravenelii Berk. & M.A.Curtis (1873)

Synonyms
- Aedycia ravenelii (Berk. & M.A.Curtis) Kuntze (1898)

= Phallus ravenelii =

Ravenel's stinkhorn

Stinkhorn fungus from North America

Phallus ravenelii
- Mycological characteristics
- Glebal hymenium
- Cap is conical
- Stipe is bare
- Ecology is saprotrophic
- Edibility is edible but not recommended

Phallus ravenelii, commonly known as Ravenel's stinkhorn, is a fungus in the Phallaceae (stinkhorn) family. It is found in eastern North America. Its mushrooms commonly grow in large clusters and are noted for their foul odor and phallic shape when mature. It is saprobic, and as such it is encountered in a wide variety of habitats rich in wood debris, from forests to mulched gardens or sawdust piles in urban areas. It appears from August to October. The fruit body emerges from a pink or lavender-colored egg to form a tall, cylindrical, hollow and spongy white stalk with a bell-shaped cap. The remains of the egg persist as a white to pink or lilac volva at the base of the stalk. The cap is covered in a foul-smelling olive-green spore slime, which attracts insects that help to spread the spores. Sometimes, the cap has a "veil" attached—a thin membrane that hangs underneath. The lack of a roughly ridged and pitted cap differentiates it from the closely related Phallus impudicus. The fungus is named after Henry William Ravenel, a botanist who first discovered it in 1846, though it remained undescribed until 1873. It is considered to be an edible mushroom while in its egg form.

== Taxonomy ==
"Volva ovate, but slightly split above; stem independent of the pileus, 1½ inch high; pileus 1½ inch high, truncate at the apex, even."

— Berkeley's original description

The species was first described officially in the scientific literature by English mycologist Miles Berkeley in an 1873 publication. Berkeley obtained the specimens from Moses Ashley Curtis, which had in turn been sent to him by Ravenel from collections he made at the Santee River in South Carolina in 1846. Although the specimen had been sent with Ravenel's extensive collection notes, Berkeley's description was brief, and he neglected to mention the veil. American Curtis Gates Lloyd later disparaged the quality of Berkeley's description, and noted "he was so busy that he could not take the time to consider the details, and his "description" tells nothing of the leading characters of the species." Charles Horton Peck, upon encountering the fungus in North America, could not identify it using Berkeley's description, and instead had to contact Ravenel to obtain his original collection notes before he could confirm its identity. Peck later wrote a full description of the species. In 1898, Edward Angus Burt placed the taxon in the genus Dictyophora, based on the presence of the veil. Otto Kuntze transferred the taxon to the genus Aedycia (now equivalent with Mutinus), resulting in the synonym Aedycia ravenelii. The mushroom is commonly known as the eastern stinkhorn or Ravenel's stinkhorn.

== Description ==
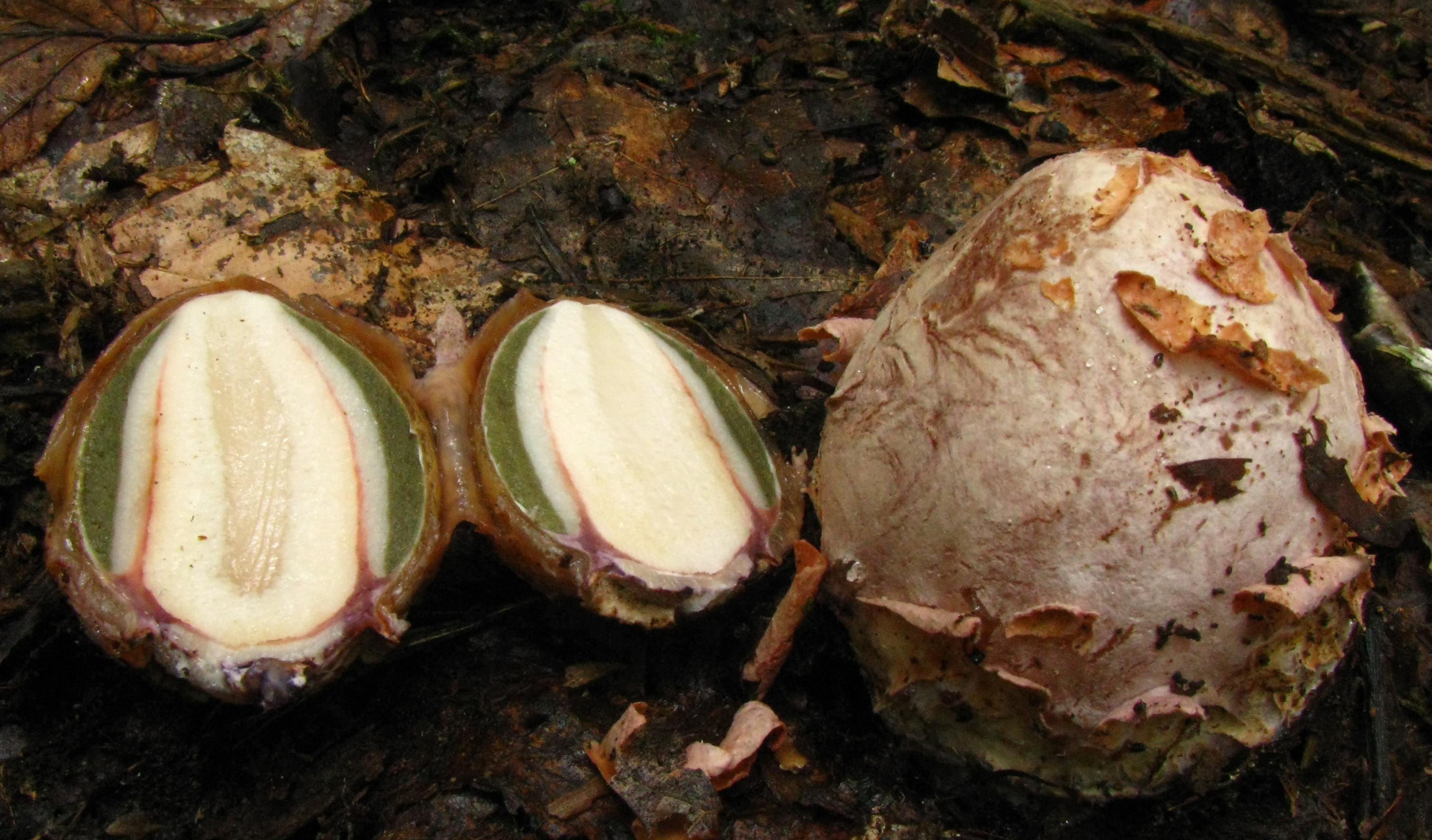
A bisected egg

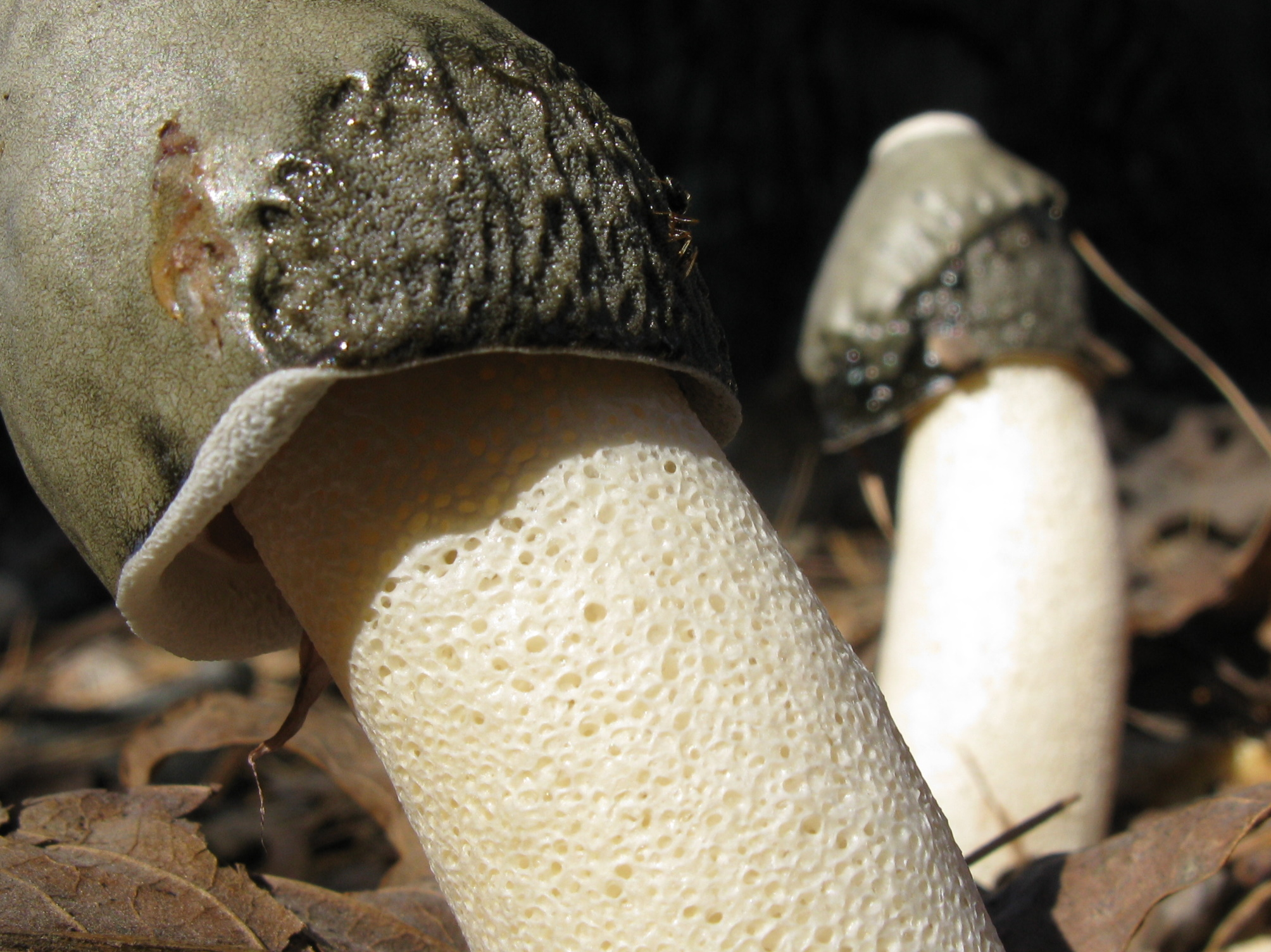
Close-up of cap and stalk surfaces

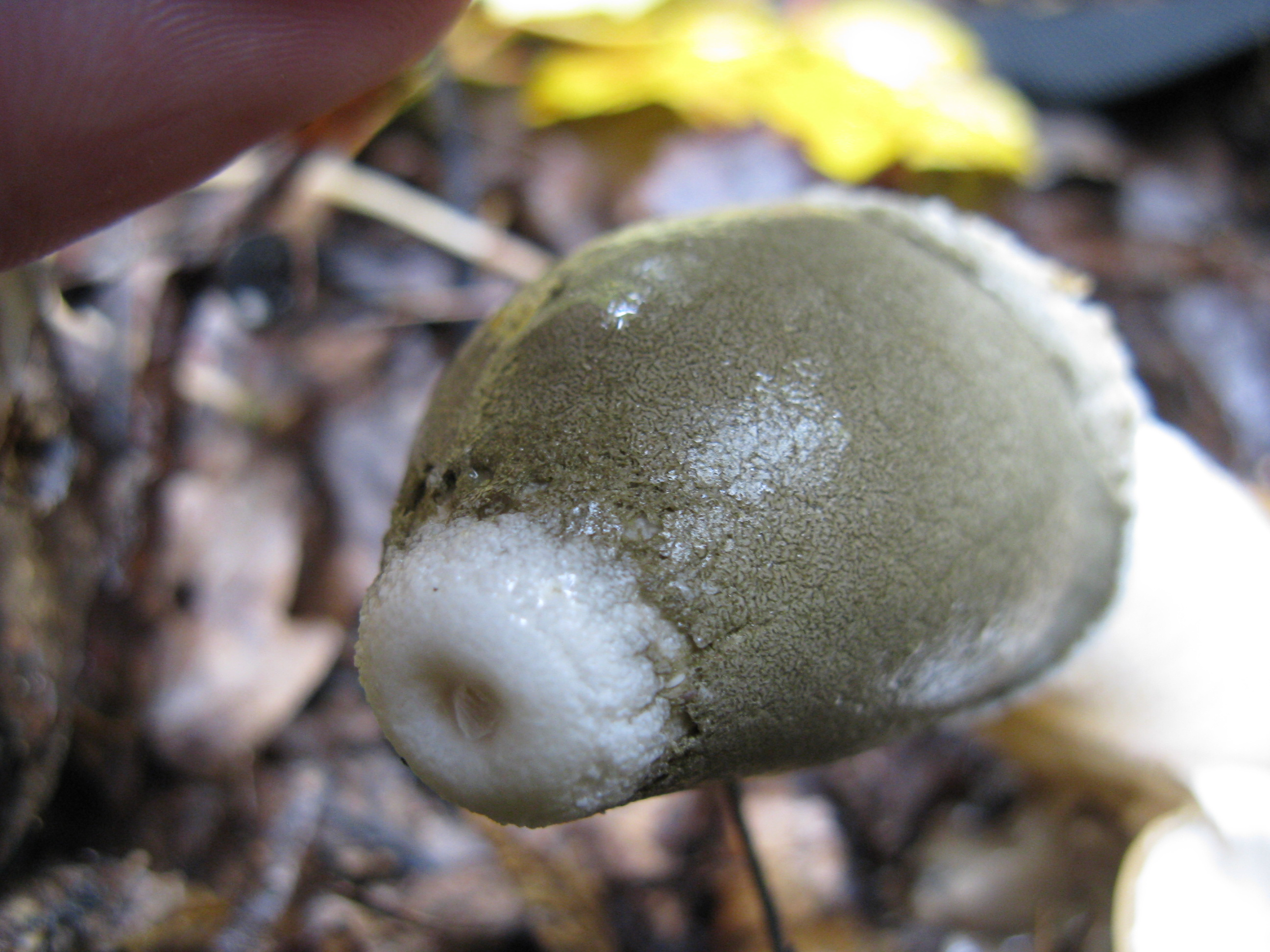
The cap has a white open circlet at the top.

The mushroom begins its development in the form of pink-, lilac-, or purple-tinged "eggs" that resemble a puffball. The egg expands rapidly to form a phallus-shaped structure with a yellowish-white stalk and thimble-like cap. The cap ranges from 1.5 to 4 cm (0.6 to 1.6 in) in width and 3 to 4.5 cm (1.2 to 1.8 in) in height; the entire fruit body can reach heights of 20 cm (7.9 in). The cap texture is finely granular and it is attached to a white open circlet at the top where it meets the stalk. In some specimens, this opening is relatively large with a broad margin, and gives the mushroom a truncated appearance. Microscopically, the cap surfaces comprises minute cells and cavities, with a spongy structure similar to that of the stem, but with smaller perforations than the stem. The lower margin of the cap is free from attachment to the stalk, and there is sometimes a membranous veil suspended like a collar around the stem under the cap; the veil can be of varying lengths. This veil can be seen in dissected eggs where it is present as a distinct, thin membranous tissue between the stalk and the cap before expansion. In this form, the veil is continuous from its attachment with the "primordial tissue" (Note: Primordial tissue is homogenous, compact tissue present in the young (egg-form) fruit body made of densely interwoven hyphae rich in protoplasm, that later grows and differentiates to form parts of the mature fruit body) at the base of the stalk and volva below to the tip of the stem at the point where it joins the cap. The veil produced in P. ravenelli is distinct from the flaring, net-like indusium produced by Phallus species like P. indusiatus. Gleba covers the head and is olive-green to dark brown in color, slimy in texture, and foul smelling. The spores measure 3 to 4.5 μm by 1 to 2 μm, are colorless, elliptical in shape, and smooth in texture. They are thin-walled and covered with a thin, hyaline (transparent), sticky coating.

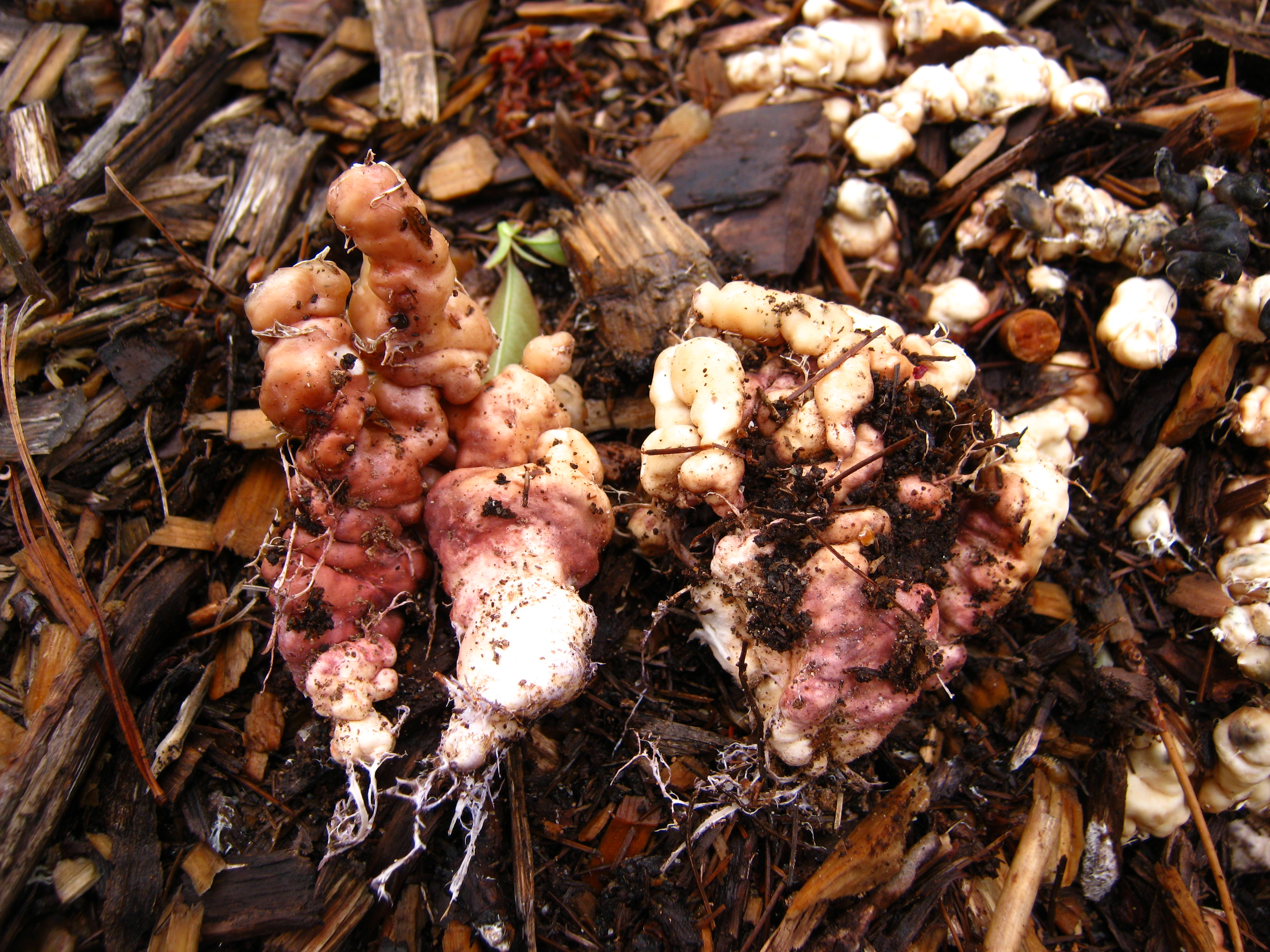
Sclerotia and rhizomorphs

The stalk is hollow and measures 10 to 15 cm (3.9 to 5.9 in) tall and 1.5 to 3 cm (0.6 to 1.2 in) thick. It can range in color from slightly yellowish to white. At the stalk's base there is usually a white to pink volva (a sac-like cup). When immature, the fruit body is encapsulated within the volva present as a peridium (skin-like tissue layer), which ruptures as the mushroom emerges. The volva attaches to the substrate with whitish or pinkish rhizomorphs (thick, cord-like strands of mycelia). Rhizomorphs and mycelia that are exposed to air eventually turn whitish in color; those freshly exposed from their substrate usually quickly turn bluish purple. The fungus produces watery and fleshy sclerotia that range in thickness from 1 to 10 mm with a length of up to 30 mm. The sclerotia are irregularly convoluted and lobed, and become hard and horny upon drying. Sclerotia have a color reaction similar to that noted for rhizomorphs, and, after long exposure to air, will gradually turn a uniform dark reddish brown. Phallus ravenelli is considered edible if in the egg form, and has a "mild" taste. The foul odor of mature mushrooms would dissuade most from collecting for the purpose of consumption.

== Similar species ==
Lookalikes

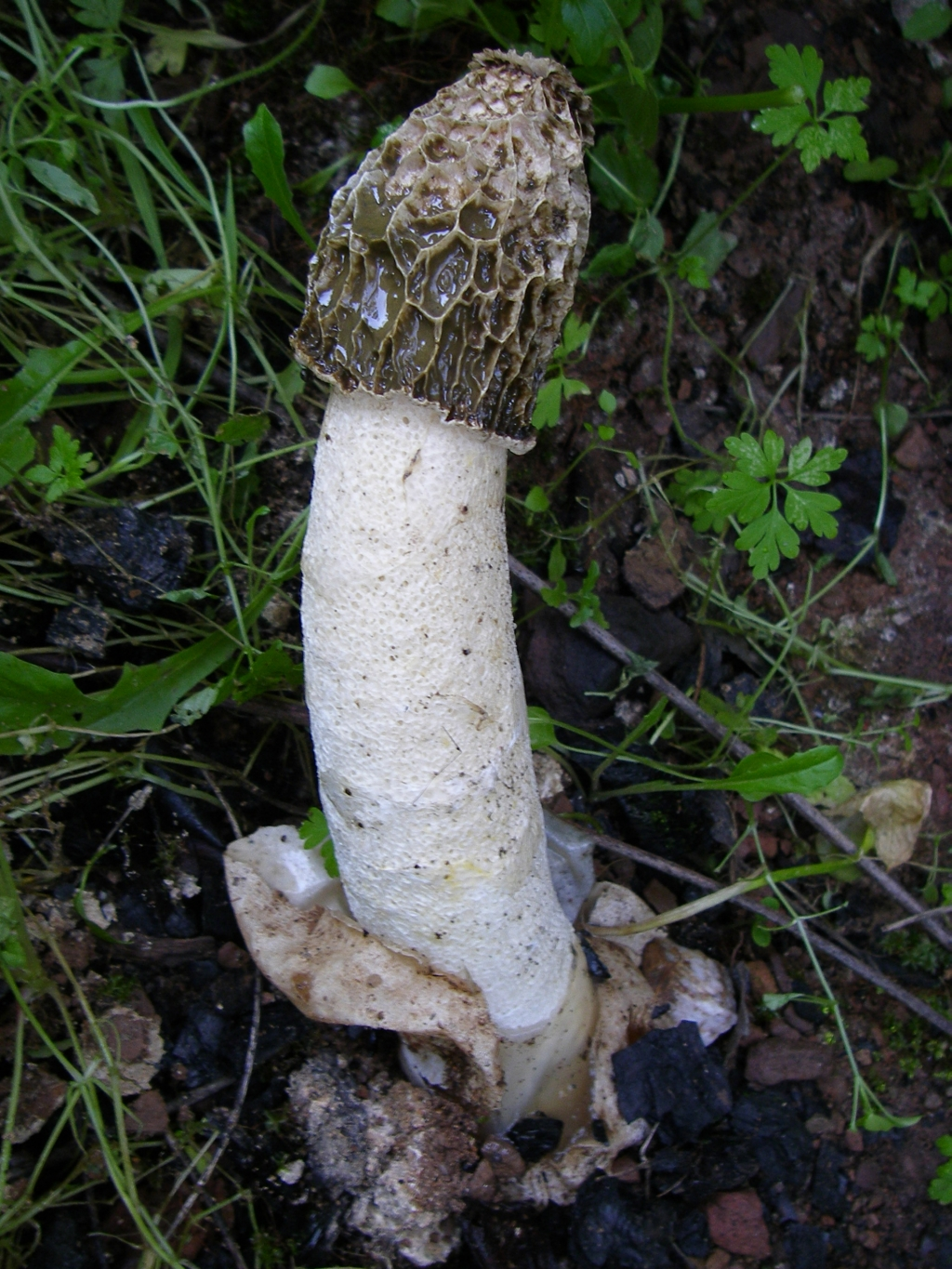
P. impudicus

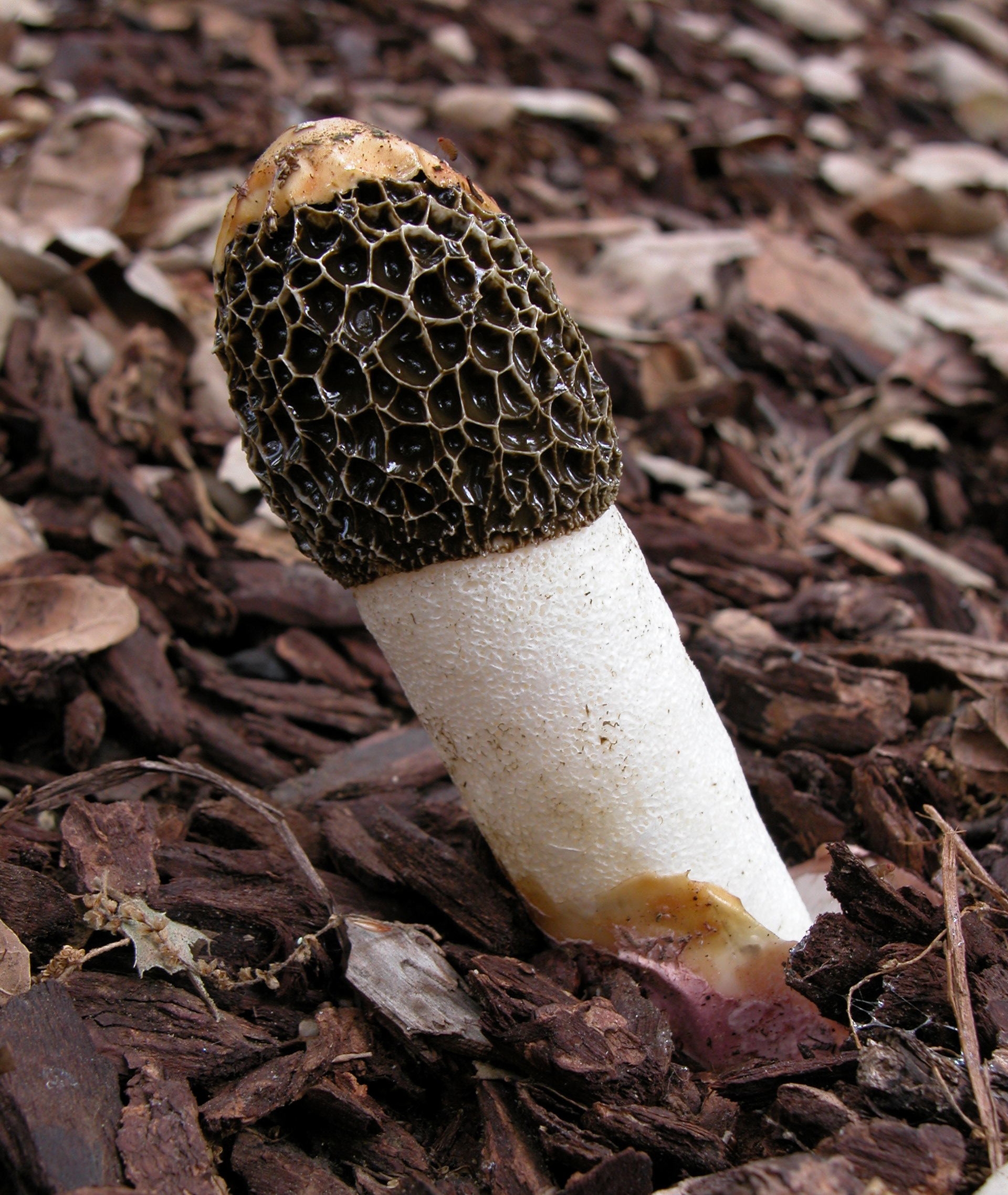
P. hadriani

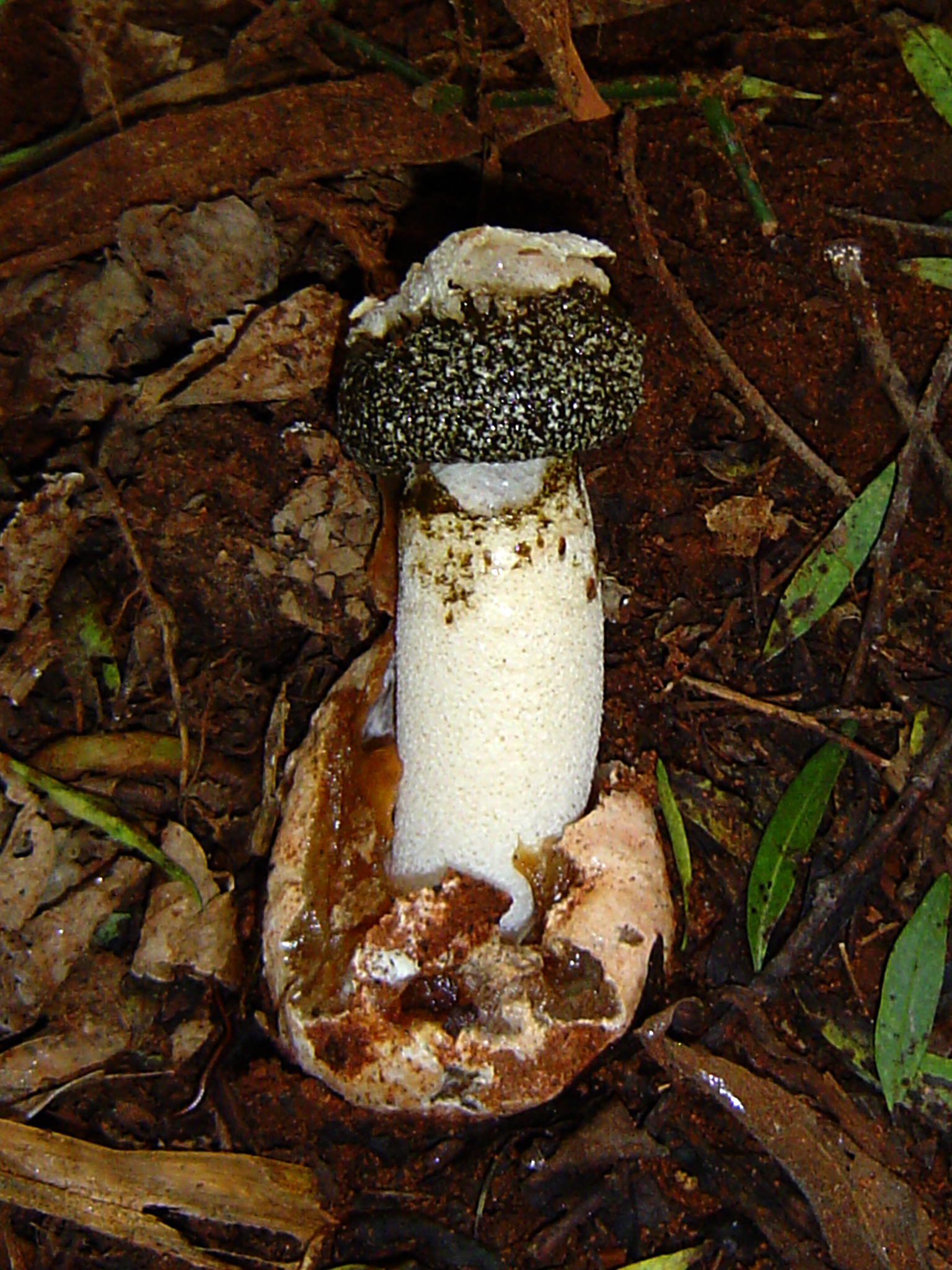
Itajahya galericulata

Phallus ravenelli is often confused with P. impudicus and P. hadriani. P. impudicus has a highly reticulate (a net-like pattern of grooves and ridges) cap under the gleba. P. hadriani also has a pitted cap, and occurs less frequently than P. ravenelii. The widespread species Itajahya galericulata has a roughly spherical cap of several overlapping spongy tissue layers with gleba sandwiched in-between. Satyrus rugulosus is tall, thin, pale orange, and tapers towards the smooth cap. The cap is blackish olive in color, while the volva is oval and white. It is found in the eastern and southern United States and China. P. granulosodenticulatus is a rare Brazilian species with a superficial resemblance to P. ravenelii. Apart from its distribution, it is distinguished from P. ravenelii by its smaller fruit bodies up to 9 cm (3.5 in) tall, a cogged cap margin, and somewhat larger spores that measure 3.8–5 μm by 2–3 μm.

== Distribution and habitat ==
Ravenel's stinkhorn is widespread in eastern North America, from Quebec in the north, south to Florida and west to Iowa and Ohio. West of the Mississippi, the common stinkhorn (Phallus impudicus) becomes more dominant. In the early 1900s, Lloyd called it the most common phalloid in the United States. The fungus is also found in Costa Rica.

As a saprobic mushroom, or decomposer of organic material, Ravenel's stinkhorn can be found in almost any habitat that includes decaying wood. They are most often found growing in groups, though occasionally singly, on wood chips, rotten tree stumps or sawdust. They are common in urban flowerbeds, parks and lawns, as well as in meadows, cultivated areas and woods. The foul odor of the gleba attracts insects that walk and feed on the spore-bearing surface, and later disseminate the sticky spores to other locales.
