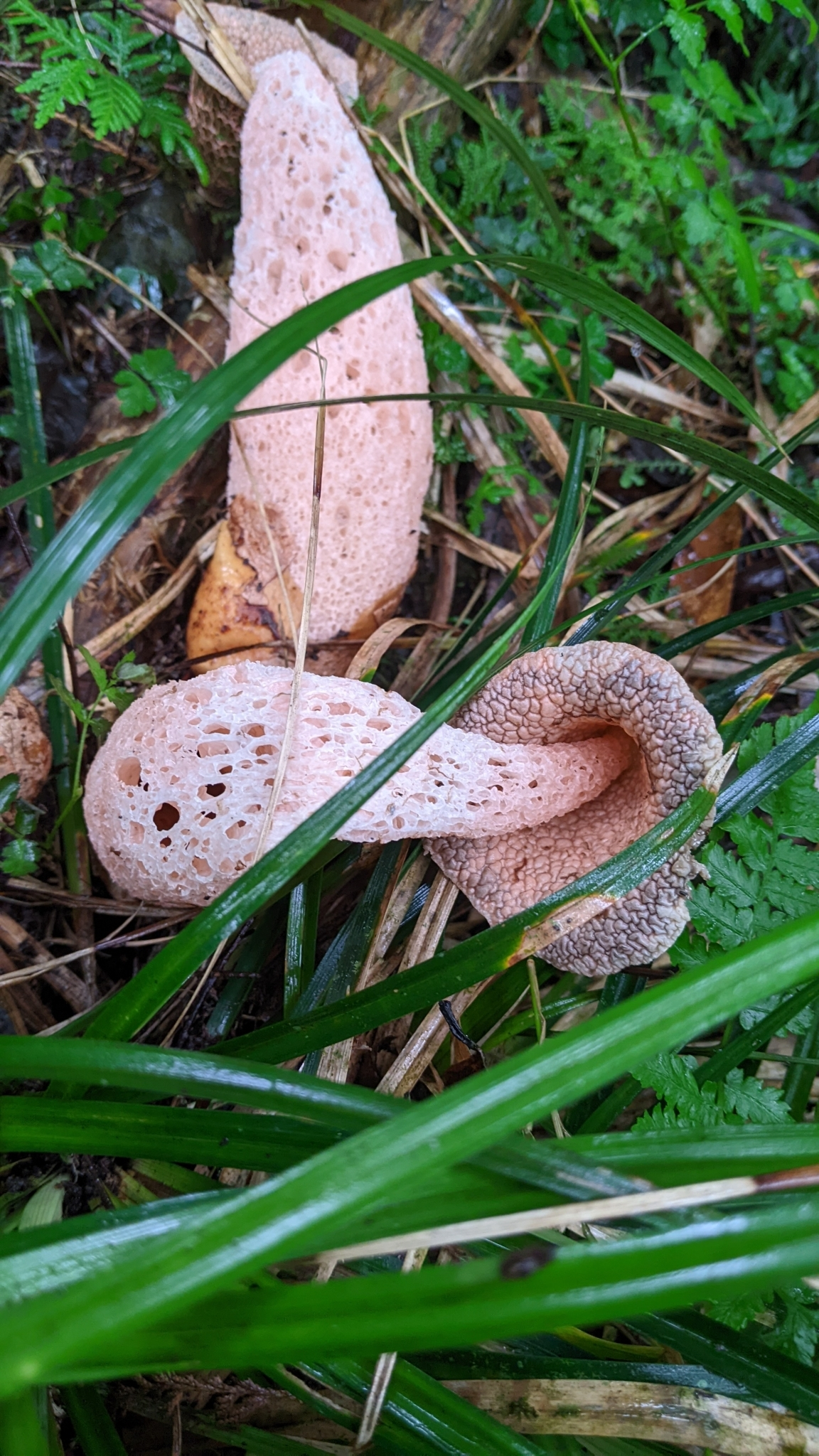

Scientific classification
- Kingdom: Fungi
- Division: Basidiomycota
- Class: Agaricomycetes
- Order: Phallales
- Family: Phallaceae
- Genus: Phallus
- Species: P. formosanus

Binomial name
- Phallus formosanus Kobayasi

Synonyms
- Ithyphallus roseus Sawada

= Phallus formosanus =

Species of fungus

Phallus formosanus, or more commonly witch's hat stinkhorn, is a species of fungus in the stinkhorn family, Phallaceae.

== Description ==
The witch's hat stinkhorn appears with a thick but hollow light rose-pink stem that tapers as it gets closer to the cap. The cap appears in the shape of almost a bell but it flares on the bottom. The cap is deeply pitted similar to Phallus impudicus. It secretes gleba like almost all other stinkhorns which it uses for spore dispersal by attracting insects with a foul odor.

== Taxonomy ==
It was first described in 1931 as Ithyphallus roseus. When transferred to the genus Phallus in 1938, the replacement name Phallus formosanus was required as Phallus roseus had been published in 1813 for a different species.

The duplicated and hence illegitimate name Phallus formosanus was published in 1957 by W.S. Lee and is now correctly Phallus taipeiensis.
