= Phallus flavidus =

Scientific classification
- Domain: Eukaryota
- Kingdom: Fungi
- Division: Basidiomycota
- Class: Agaricomycetes
- Order: Phallales
- Family: Phallaceae
- Genus: Phallus
- Species: P. flavidus

Binomial name
- Phallus flavidus Kreisel & Hauskn. (2009)

Stinkhorn fungus from the Seychelles

Phallus flavidus is a species of fungus in the stinkhorn family. Described as new to science in 2009, it is found in the Seychelles.
