= Phallus pygmaeus =

Scientific classification
- Domain: Eukaryota
- Kingdom: Fungi
- Division: Basidiomycota
- Class: Agaricomycetes
- Order: Phallales
- Family: Phallaceae
- Genus: Phallus
- Species: P. pygmaeus

Binomial name
- Phallus pygmaeus Baseia

Stinkhorn fungus from Brazil

Phallus pygmaeus Mycological characteristics
- Smooth hymenium
- No distinct cap
- Hymenium attachment is irregular or not applicable
- Stipe has a volva
- Spore print is olive
- Ecology is saprotrophic
- Edibility is unknown

Phallus pygmaeus is a species of stinkhorn mushroom. It was found growing on rotten wood in the State of Pernambuco, Brazil, and first reported in 2003. The fruiting bodies, which are otherwise similar in appearance to the well-known Phallus impudicus, do not typically grow more than 1 cm (0.4 in) long.
