= Phallus coronatus =

Crowned Stinkhorn

Scientific classification
- Kingdom: Fungi
- Division: Basidiomycota
- Class: Agaricomycetes
- Order: Phallales
- Family: Phallaceae
- Genus: Phallus
- Species: P. coronatus

Binomial name
- Phallus coronatus Rebriev

Species of fungus

Phallus coronatus or Crowned Stinkhorn is a species of fungus belonging to the genus Phallus. It is found in Southeast Asia though it is rare. It was documented in 2014.

This stinkhorn has a light pink stalk leading into a cap that is slightly longer than average common stinkhorns. Its cap is deeply pitted not dissimilar to Phallus impudicus and the top of it where most stinkhorns have a ring the same color as the stipe flares, appearing crowned.
