= List of taxa named after human genitals =

This a list of species, genera, and other biological taxa named after human genitals.

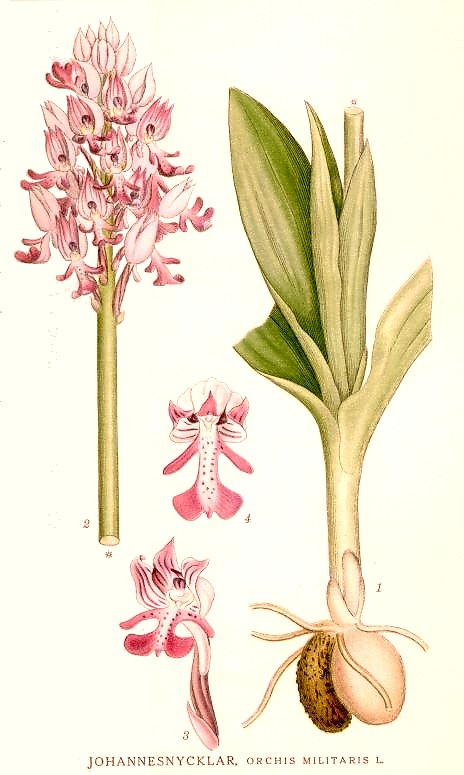
Orchis militaris, a member of the Orchidaceae family. The genus name originates in the Ancient Greek ὄρχις (órkhis), or "testicle", due to the shape of the twin tubers.

== Epithets ==
- pubescens. The word originates from the Latin pubes, 'adult, full-grown'; "genital area, groin" (e.g., Pubis); 'the down or soft hair which begins to grow on young persons when they come to the age of puberty'. The use of the term in biology to refer to hairiness or soft down is recorded since 1760 for plants and since 1826 for insects.
- vaginalis. The common specific name is derived from the Latin vagina, originally meaning 'sheath, scabbard, covering; sheath of an ear of grain, hull, husk'. The specific epithet may refer to a sheathed trait or habit of an organism (e.g. Alysicarpus vaginalis), or may refer to resemblance/relation to the vagina (e.g. Gardnerella vaginalis)

== Plants ==
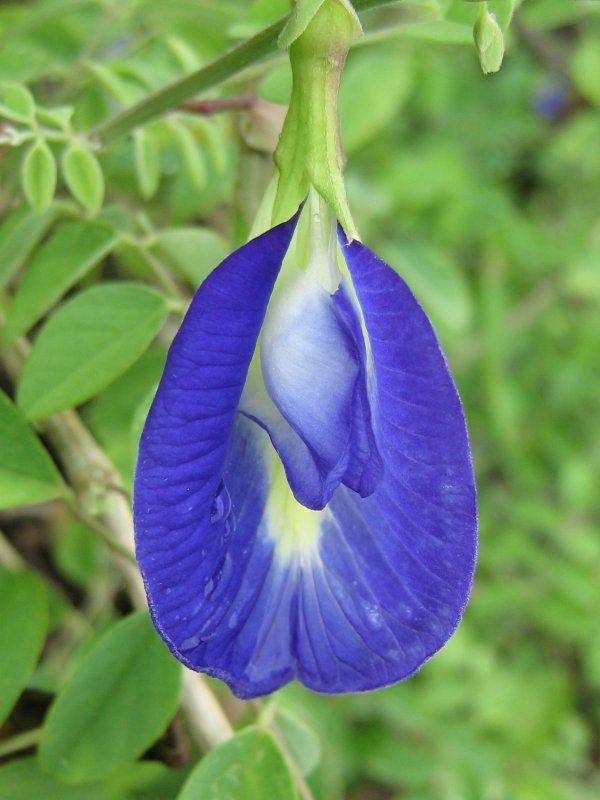
Flower of Clitoria ternatea

=== Families ===
- Orchidaceae. The type genus is Orchis, whose name comes from the Ancient Greek ὄρχις (órkhis), literally meaning 'testicle', because of the shape of the twin tubers in some species of Orchis.

=== Subtribes ===
- Clitoriinae

=== Genera ===
- Amorphophallus
- Clitoria
- Clitoriopsis
- Orchis

=== Species ===
- Alysicarpus vaginalis
- Baumea vaginalis
- Chenopodium vulvaria
- Festuca vaginalis
- Pontederia vaginalis

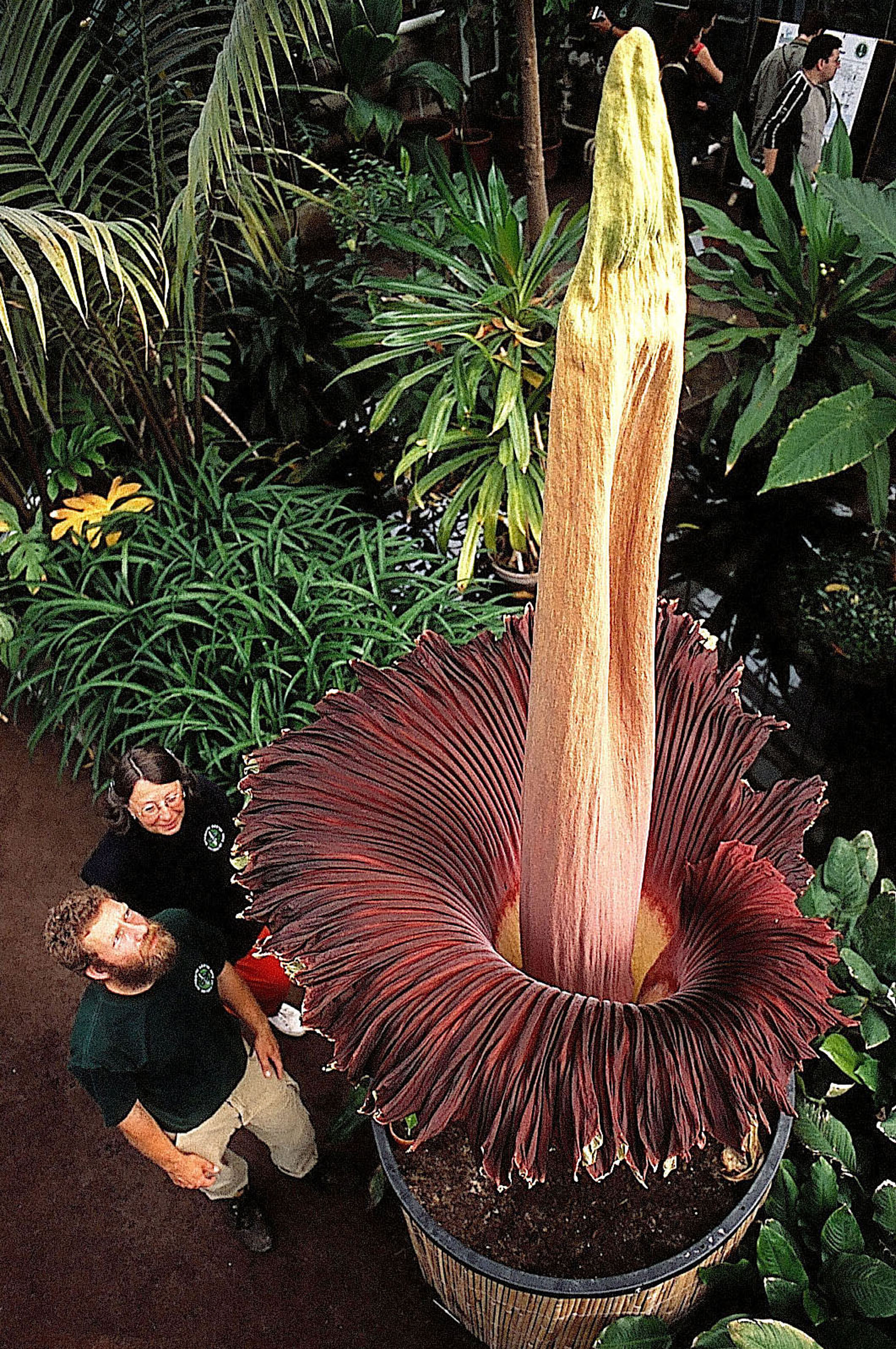
Amorphophallus titanum

=== Varieties ===
- Capsicum annum var. annum 'penis pepper'

== Fungi ==
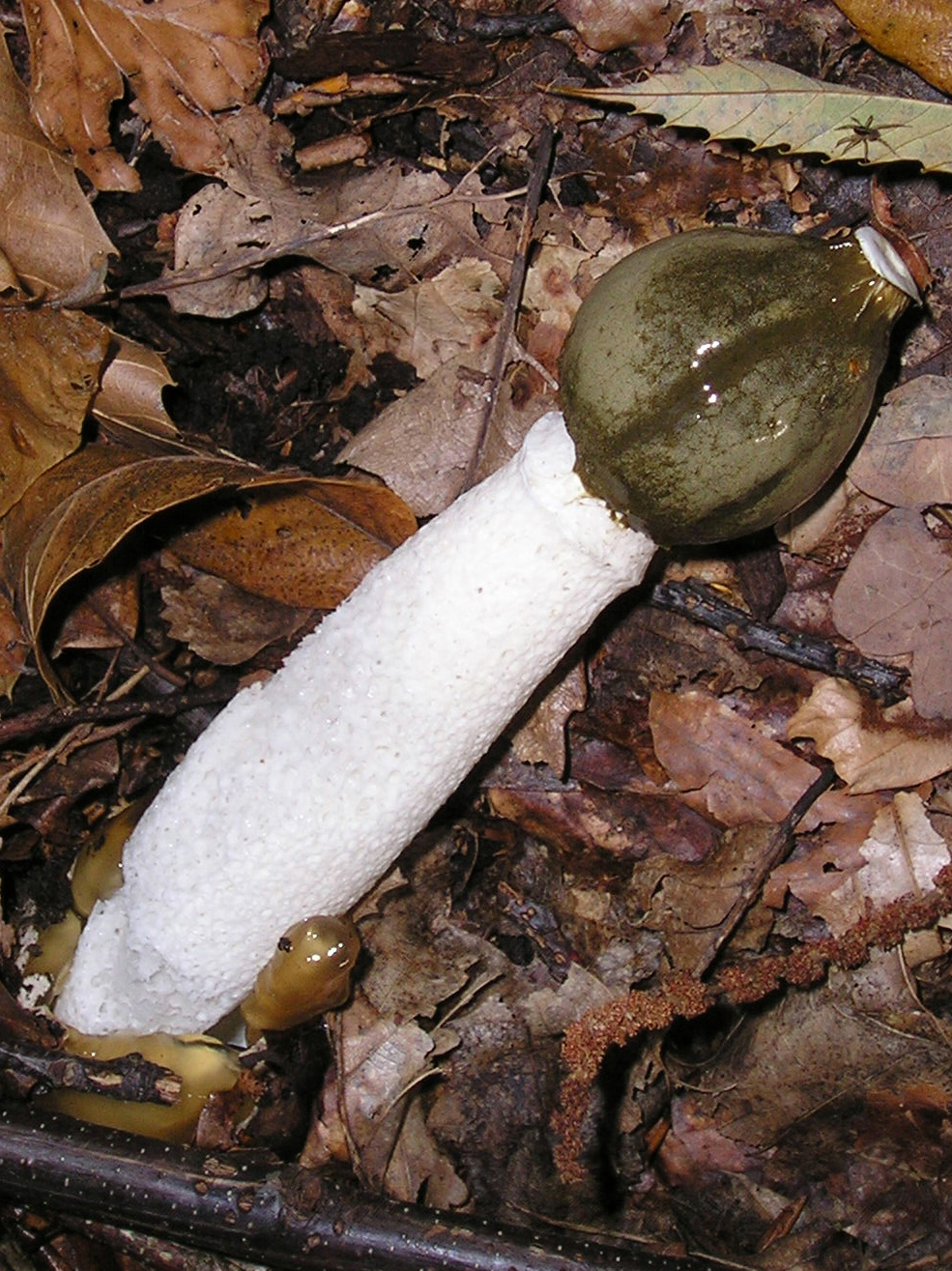
Phallus impudicus

=== Orders ===
- Phallales

=== Families ===
- Phallaceae

=== Genera ===
- Phallus

=== Species ===
- Amanita phalloides
- Amanita vaginata
- Stachybotrys clitoriae - a species of Stachybotrys found on leaves of the Clitoria species Clitoria densiflora.

== Animals ==
=== Genera ===
- Phallichthys. The genus name literally means "phallus (penis) fish", from the Greek phallos meaning "penis" and ichthys meaning "fish", referring to the "comparatively huge" gonopodium, the modified anal fin used for copulation.
- Xenophallus. The genus name translates to "strange penis".

=== Species ===
- Trypauchen vagina
- Arioliax dolichophallus

=== Subspecies ===
- Muntiacus muntjak vaginalis

=== Animal fossils ===
- Scrotum humanum
