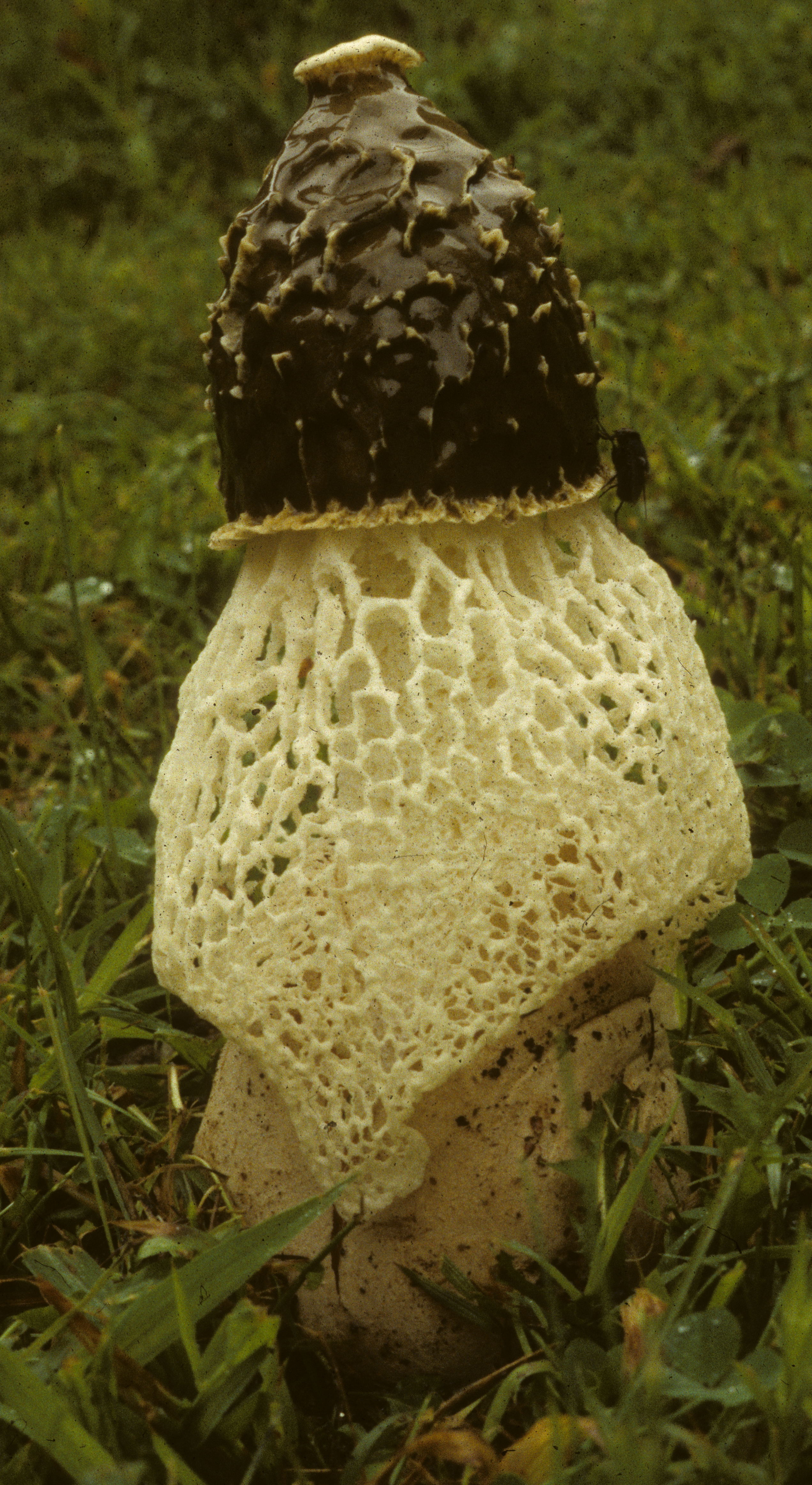

Scientific classification
- Kingdom: Fungi
- Division: Basidiomycota
- Class: Agaricomycetes
- Order: Phallales
- Family: Phallaceae
- Genus: Phallus
- Species: P. duplicatus

Binomial name
- Phallus duplicatus Bosc (1811)

Synonyms
- Dictyophora duplicata (Bosc) E.Fisch. (1888); Hymenophallus duplicatus (Bosc) Nees (1817)

= Phallus duplicatus =

Species of stinkhorn fungus

Phallus duplicatus (common name, netted stinkhorn, Short Skirted Stinkhorn or wood witch) is a species of fungus in the stinkhorn family. The bell-shaped to oval cap is green-brown and the cylindrical stalk is white. When mature, the cap becomes sticky with a slimy green coating, which attracts flies that disperse its spores, and a distinct, "netted" universal veil. It often grows in public lawns, and can also be found in meadows. The fungus is edible when still in the "egg" stage, before the fruit body has expanded.

== Taxonomy ==
The species was first described in 1811 by French botanist Louis Bosc. Synonyms include Dictyophora duplicata and Hymenophallus duplicatus.

It is commonly known as the netted stinkhorn or the wood witch.

== Description ==
Immature fruit bodies are roughly spherical, whitish to pink in color, and have thick rhizomorphs at the base. Fully grown and matured, the fruit body is cylindrical and up to 20 centimetres (8 inches) tall, with the stalk accounting for 8–15 cm (3–6 in) of its height. The cap is bell-shaped to ovaline, 3.5–5 cm (1 1/2–2 in) tall and about 4 cm (1 1/2 in) wide. The cap is initially covered with a foetid greenish slime, the gleba. Its surface is covered with chambers and pits, and there is a perforation at the tip with a white rim. Below the cap hangs a white, lacy, skirt-like veil, or indusium. The spores are cylindrical, hyaline (translucent), smooth, and measure 3.5–4.2 by 1–1.5 μm.

The species resembles Phallus indusiatus, but that species has a longer indusium and smaller spores.

== Habitat and distribution ==
A saprobic species, the fruit bodies of Phallus duplicatus grow singly or in small groups on the ground in woods, gardens, and landscaped areas. The smelly gleba coating the cap attracts flies and other insects, which consume it and help to disperse the spores.

Phallus duplicatus is known from Asia (China and Japan), eastern North America (between August and November), and South America (Brazil). Although it has been widely recorded from Europe, some of these may be misidentifications with the similar Phallus impudicus var. togatus. P. duplicatus is Red Listed in Ukraine.

== Uses ==
The fruit bodies are edible when still in the "egg" stage.

== In culture ==
The species was featured on a Paraguayan postage stamp in 1986.
