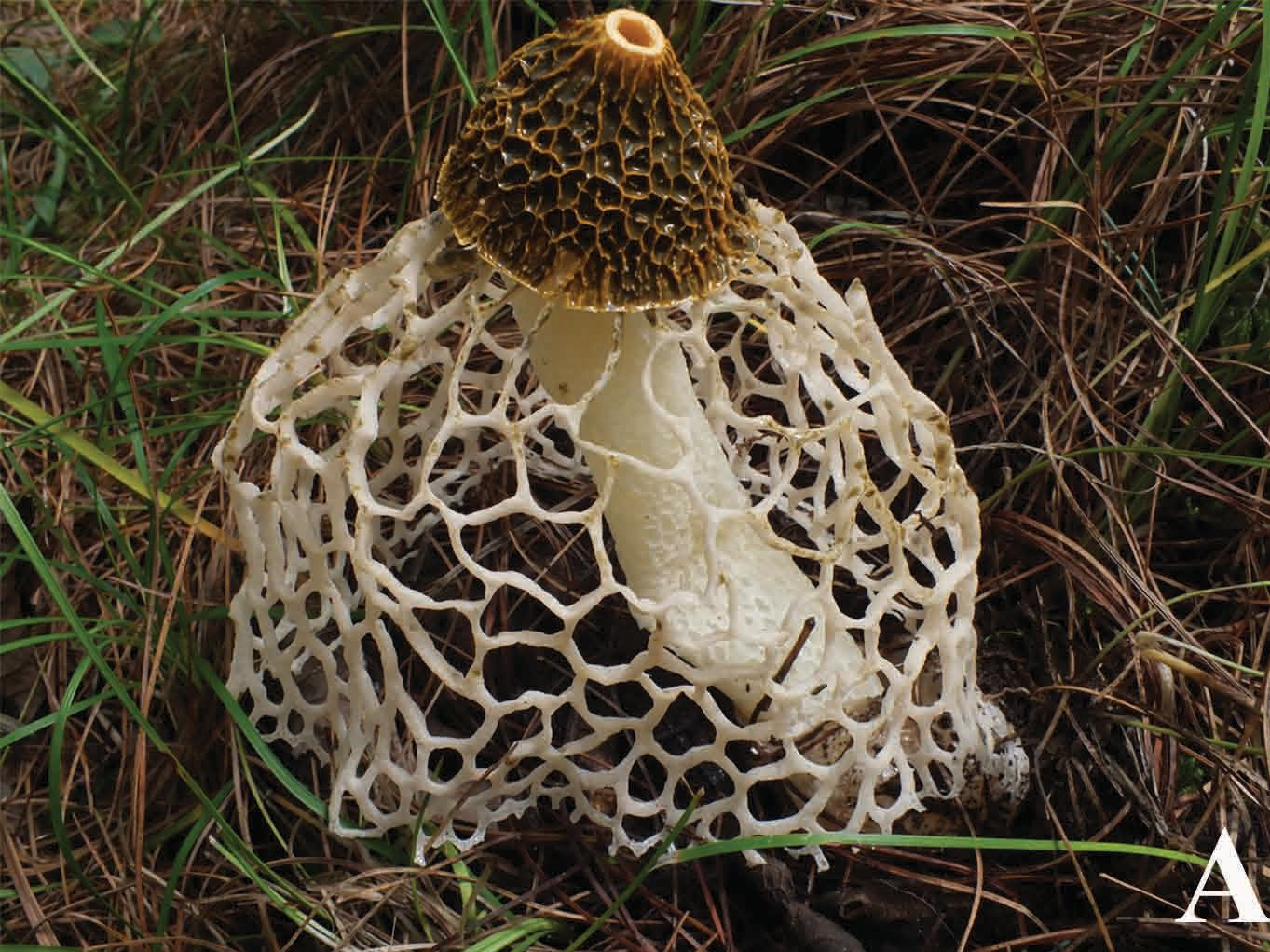

Scientific classification
- Kingdom: Fungi
- Division: Basidiomycota
- Class: Agaricomycetes
- Order: Phallales
- Family: Phallaceae
- Genus: Phallus
- Species: P. haitangensis

Binomial name
- Phallus haitangensis H.L. Li, P.E. Mortimer, J.C. Xu & K.D. Hyde,

= Phallus haitangensis =

Species of Agaricomycetes

Phallus haitangensis is a species of fungus belonging to the Phallus genus. It was documented in 2016 in Yunnan, China. The species name "haitangensis" refers to Haitangwa, the name of the village in which the species was found. It was found on soil under Pinus armandii.
