= D. lutea =

D. lutea may refer to:

- Dahlia lutea, a plant native to Mexico
- Dalea lutea, a prairie clover
- Demequina lutea, a gram-positive bacterium
- Dendronephthya lutea, a soft coral
- Diadora lutea, a jewel beetle
- Dicranomyia lutea, a crane fly
- Dictyophora lutea, an Asian fungus
- Digitalis lutea, a perennial plant
- Diplommatina lutea, a land snail
- Diplopterys lutea, a flowering plant
