= Phallus drewesii =

Scientific classification
- Domain: Eukaryota
- Kingdom: Fungi
- Division: Basidiomycota
- Class: Agaricomycetes
- Order: Phallales
- Family: Phallaceae
- Genus: Phallus
- Species: P. drewesii

Binomial name
- Phallus drewesii Dennis Desjardin, 2009

Stinkhorn fungus from São Tomé

Phallus drewesii is a species of stinkhorn mushroom endemic to São Tomé that was first described in 2009. It can be distinguished from the other 28 stinkhorn mushrooms in the genus Phallus by its small size, white net-like stem, brown spore-covered head and by its stem curving down instead of up. The species was named after Robert Drewes, Curator of Herpetology at the California Academy of Sciences.
