= Phallus callichrous =

Scientific classification
- Kingdom: Fungi
- Division: Basidiomycota
- Class: Agaricomycetes
- Order: Phallales
- Family: Phallaceae
- Genus: Phallus
- Species: P. callichrous

Binomial name
- Phallus callichrous (A.Möller) Lloyd (1907)

Synonyms
- Dictyophora callichroa A.Möller (1895); Dictyophora indusiata f. callichroa (A.Möller) Kobayasi (1965)

Stinkhorn fungus from South America

Phallus callichrous is a species of fungus in the stinkhorn family found in South America. Originally named Dictyophora callichroa by German mycologist & forester Alfred Möller in 1895, American mycologist Curtis Gates Lloyd transferred it to the genus Phallus in 1907.
