= Phallus tenuissimus =

Scientific classification
- Domain: Eukaryota
- Kingdom: Fungi
- Division: Basidiomycota
- Class: Agaricomycetes
- Order: Phallales
- Family: Phallaceae
- Genus: Phallus
- Species: P. tenuissimus

Binomial name
- Phallus tenuissimus T.H.Li, W.Q.Deng & B.Liu (2005)

Stinkhorn fungus from Yunnan, China

Phallus tenuissimus is a species of fungus in the stinkhorn family. Found in Jingdong Yi Autonomous County in Yunnan, China, it was described as new to science in 2005. Its fruit bodies feature a conical to bell-shaped cap up to 20 mm (0.8 in) high by 4–7 mm (0.16–0.28 in) wide, covered by dark greenish-brown gleba (spore mass). The cap is supported by a slender, cylindrical stipe measuring 50–70 mm (2.0–2.8 in) long and 2–4 mm thick. Its spores are cylindrical, and measure 3.3–4 by 1.1–1.4 μm. The authors place it in the section Reticulati of genus Phallus on account of its reticulate cap.
