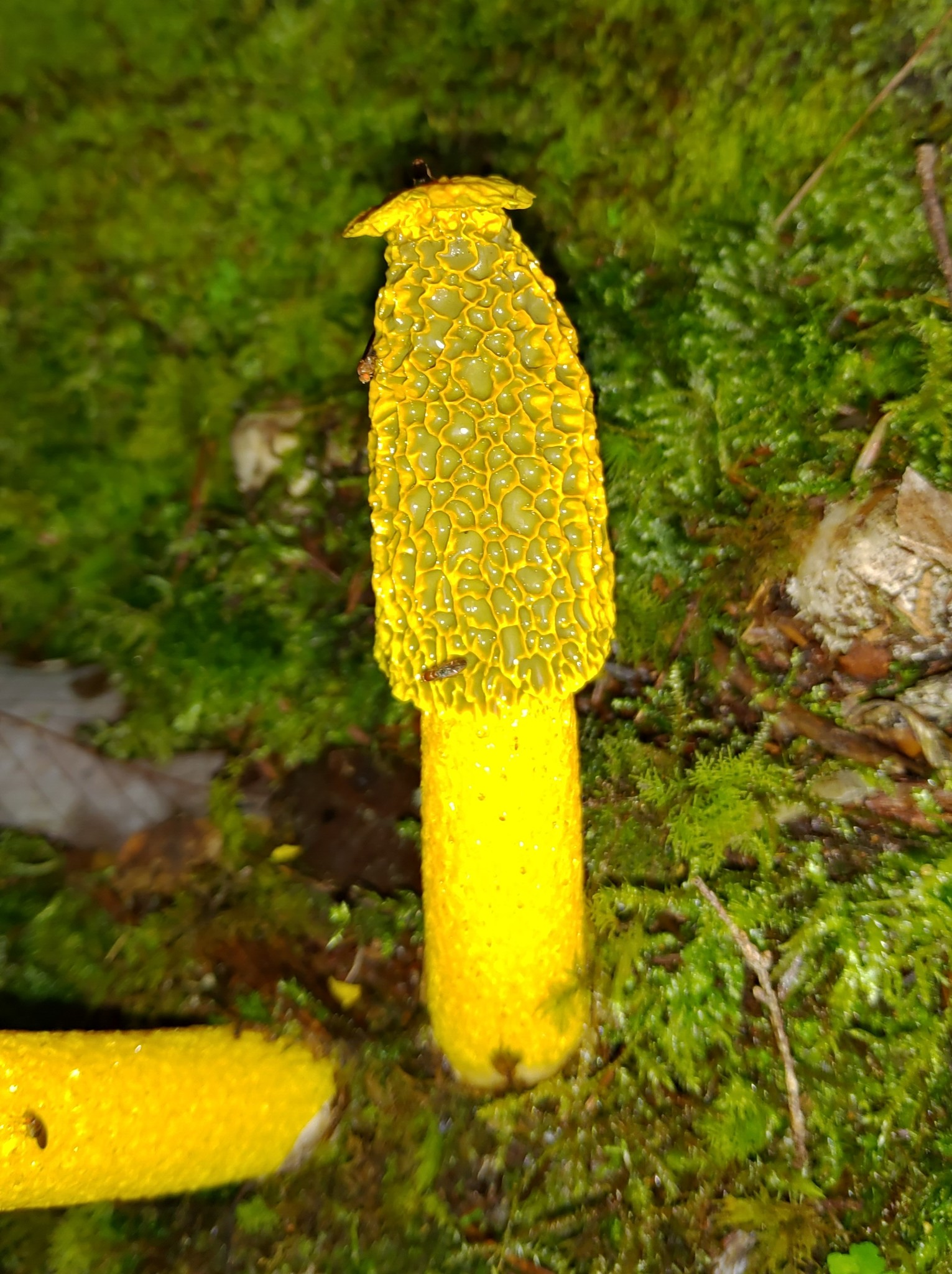
- Phallus flavocostatus in Taiwan

Scientific classification
- Kingdom: Fungi
- Division: Basidiomycota
- Class: Agaricomycetes
- Order: Phallales
- Family: Phallaceae
- Genus: Phallus
- Species: P. flavocostatus

Binomial name
- Phallus flavocostatus Kreisel (1996)

Synonyms
- Ithyphallus costatus Penz. (1899); Phallus costatus (Penz.) Lloyd (1909)

= Phallus flavocostatus =

Stinkhorn fungus from East Asia

Phallus flavocostatus is an East Asian species of fungus in the stinkhorn family. First described as Ithyphallus costatus by Otto Albert Julius Penzig in 1899, it was transferred to the genus Phallus by Curtis Gates Lloyd in 1909. It was given a new name by Hanns Kreisel in 1996.
