= Phallus minusculus =

Scientific classification
- Domain: Eukaryota
- Kingdom: Fungi
- Division: Basidiomycota
- Class: Agaricomycetes
- Order: Phallales
- Family: Phallaceae
- Genus: Phallus
- Species: P. minusculus

Binomial name
- Phallus minusculus Kreisel & Calonge (2002)

Stinkhorn fungus from Tanzania

Phallus minusculus is a species of fungus in the stinkhorn family. Found in Tanzania growing on decaying wood, it was described as new to science in 2002.
