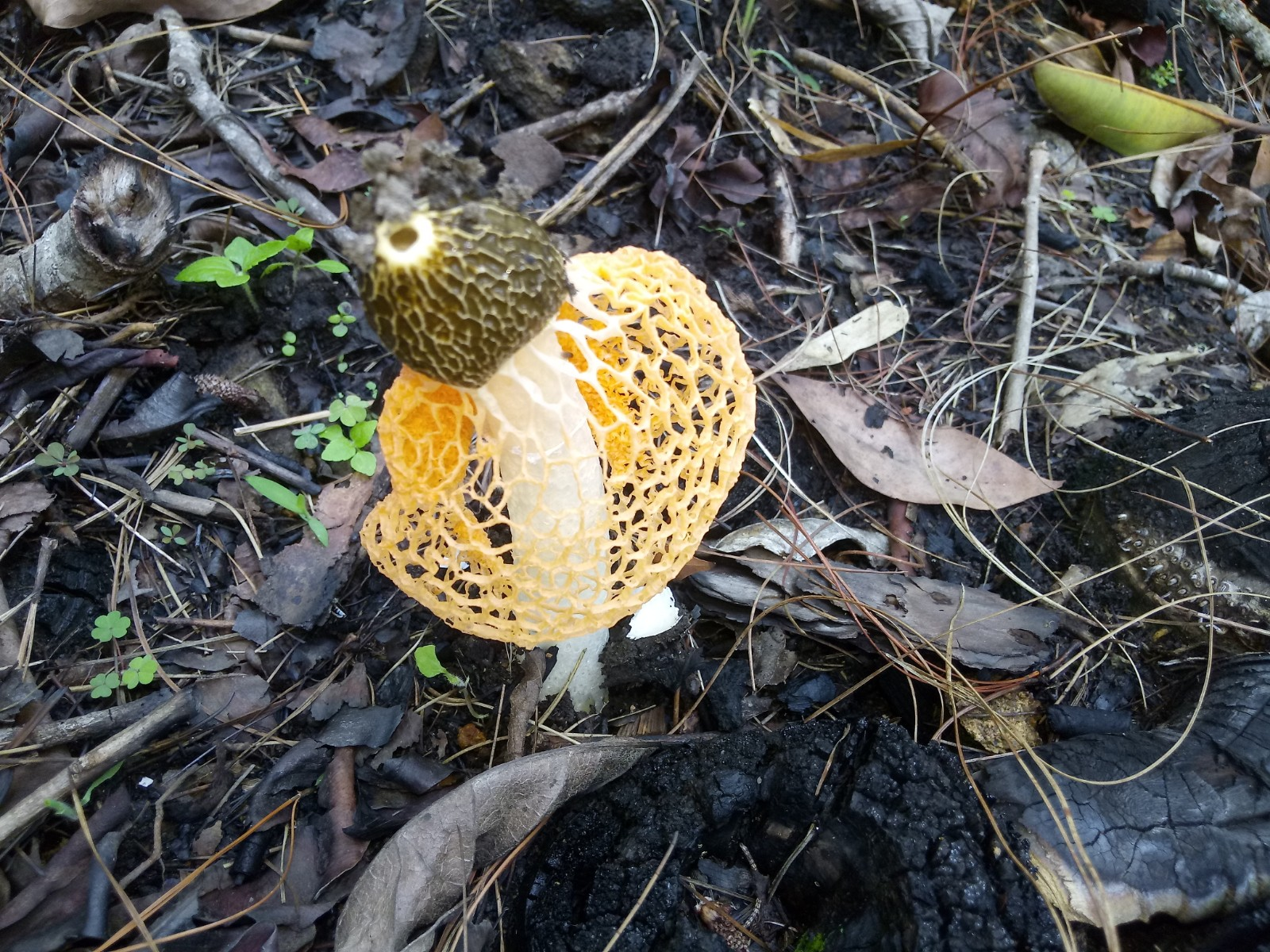

Scientific classification
- Domain: Eukaryota
- Kingdom: Fungi
- Division: Basidiomycota
- Class: Agaricomycetes
- Order: Phallales
- Family: Phallaceae
- Genus: Phallus
- Species: P. cinnabarinus

Binomial name
- Phallus cinnabarinus (W.S.Lee) Kreisel (1996)

Synonyms
- Dictyophora cinnabarina W.S.Lee (1957)

= Phallus cinnabarinus =

Stinkhorn fungus from Taiwan

Phallus cinnabarinus is a species of fungus in the stinkhorn family. Originally named in 1957 as Dictyophora cinnabarina, it was transferred to the genus Phallus in 1996 by Hanns Kreisel. It is found in Taiwan.
