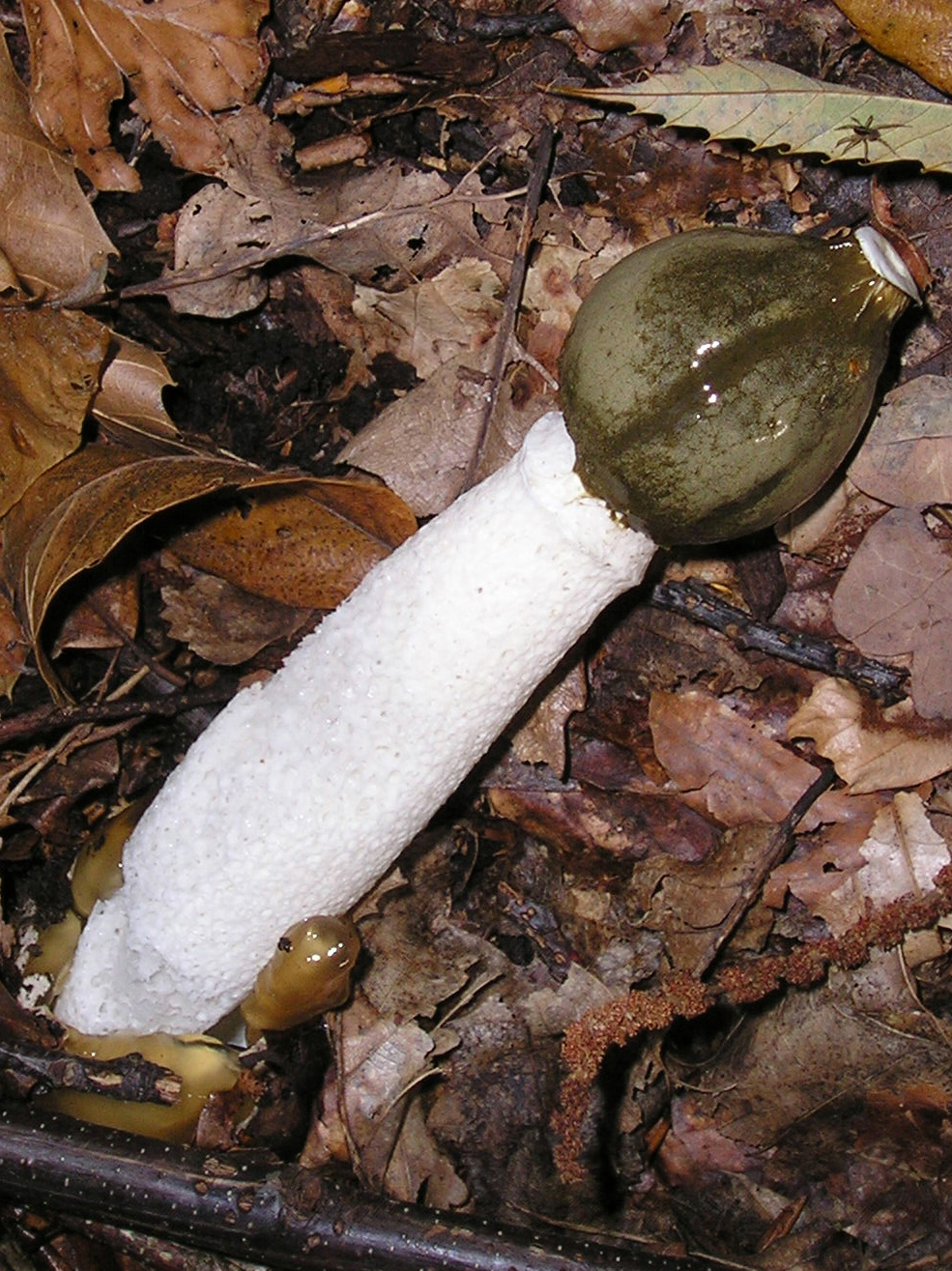
- Common stinkhorn, Phallus impudicus

Scientific classification
- Kingdom: Fungi
- Division: Basidiomycota
- Class: Agaricomycetes
- Order: Phallales
- Family: Phallaceae
- Genus: Phallus; Junius ex Linnaeus, 1758)

Type species
- Phallus impudicus L.

Synonyms
- Dictyophora sect. Clautriavia Pat. 1896; Clautriavia (Pat.) Lloyd 1909; Cryptophallus Peck 1897; Dictyopeplos Kuhl & Hasselt 1824; Dictyophallus Corda 1842; Dictyophora Desv. 1809; Hymenophallus Nees 1817; Jaczewskia Mattir. 1912; Junia Dumort. 1822; Kirchbaumia Schulzer 1866; Leiophallus (Fr.) Nees 1858; Morellus Eaton 1818; Omphalophallus Kalchbr. 1883; Phalloidastrum Battarra 1755; Retigerus Raddi 1829; Satyrus Bosc 1811; Sophronia Pers. 1827

= Phallus (fungus) =

Stinkhorn

Genus of fungi

The genus Phallus, commonly known as stinkhorns, is a group of basidiomycetes which produce a phallic, often foul-scented mushroom, from which their name is derived. The genus has a widespread distribution and, according to a 2008 estimate, contains 27 species. They belong to the family Phallaceae in the order Phallales. The best known species (and type species) is the common stinkhorn (Phallus impudicus).

== Taxonomy ==
The genus was first written about by the Dutch botanist Hadrianus Junius in a 1564 booklet about the penis-shaped organism. He says:

... I am not sure that our Phallus falls within the class of the fungi. I will not definitely decide to place it there because I do not want to make a judgment before others who know more about the matter. The lightness, however, and looseness of the substance and (a necessary condition for the existence of sponges) the sour sap of the moist earth where it was born, all bear witness that it belongs to the family of the fungi. However, the folds and creases, which do not exist here, but do among fungi, bear witness against it. There is also no trace of the cap that is normally connected to the stalk. Here the hat takes the place of the cap, and it can be removed without damage. Moreover, the site where it lives also argues against it, because this plant can only be found in dunes, and only there where old marram grass grows. Fungi, on the other hand, as stated clearly by authors, live in swampy, dirty, and rotting moist places, such as close to the roots of oak trees.

In 1753, Carl Linnaeus used the genus name Phallus in his Species Plantarum; the named was later sanctioned by Christian Hendrik Persoon when he used it in his 1801 Synopsis Methodica Fungorum.

Some authors have considered the presence of an indusium (a lacy "skirt" that hangs beneath the cap) to be an important taxonomic characteristic, and have placed taxa with indusia in a separate genus Dictyophora. More recent publications suggest that there are close morphological similarities in Phallus species with and without an indusium, so the trend has been to merge Dictyophora into Phallus; the online taxonomic databases Index Fungorum and MycoBank consider Dictyophora synonymous with Phallus.

According to the German mycologist Hanns Kreisel, who surveyed the genus in 1996, there are 33 species. Of these, 3 species are limited to the New World, 18 to the Old World, and another are 10 found in both hemispheres. His treatment divides the genus into five subgenera: Aporophallus; Itajahya; Endophallus; Satyrus; and Phallus. Spanish mycologist Francisco D. Calonge recognized 25 species in 2005, while according to the 2008 Dictionary of the Fungi, there are 18 species. More recent proposed species include P. maderensis (2008), P. luteus (2009), P. drewesii (2009), and P. calongei (2009).

=== Species ===
1. Phallus atrovolvatus – Stinkhorn fungus from Costa Rica
2. Phallus aurantiacus – Stinkhorn fungus from Nigeria
3. Phallus callichrous – Stinkhorn fungus from South America
4. Phallus calongei – Stinkhorn fungus from Pakistan
5. Phallus celebicus – Stinkhorn fungus from India
6. Phallus cinnabarinus – Stinkhorn fungus from Taiwan
7. Phallus coronatus – Species of fungus – Vietnam
8. Phallus denigricans - Brazil
9. Phallus drewesii – Stinkhorn fungus from São Tomé
10. Phallus duplicatus – Species of stinkhorn fungus
11. Phallus flavidus – Stinkhorn fungus from the Seychelles
12. Phallus flavocostatus – Stinkhorn fungus from East Asia
13. Phallus formosanus – Species of fungus
14. Phallus glutinolens – Stinkhorn fungus from Brazil
15. Phallus granulosodenticulatus – Species of fungus
16. Phallus hadriani – Dune stinkhorn or sand stinkhorn fungus
17. Phallus haitangensis – Species of Agaricomycetes description 2016, Yunnan Province
18. Phallus impudicus – Fungus known as the common stinkhorn
19. Phallus indusiatus – Widespread species of stinkhorn fungus Also known as bamboo fungus, bamboo pith, long net stinkhorn, crinoline stinkhorn or veiled lady
20. Phallus luteus – Species of stinkhorn fungus A new combination proposed in 2008 for the fungus formerly known as Dictyophora indusiata f. lutea.
21. Phallus macrosporus – Stinkhorn fungus from China
22. Phallus maderensis – Stinkhorn fungus from Madeira island
23. Phallus minusculus – Stinkhorn fungus from Tanzania Found by Francisco Calonge and Hanns Kreisel and first reported in 2002.
24. Phallus multicolor – Species of stinkhorn fungus
25. Phallus purpurascens - Brazil
26. Phallus pygmaeus – Stinkhorn fungus from Brazil This species is a miniature Phallus (up to 1 cm tall) found in the Brazilian State Pernambuco.
27. Phallus ravenelii – Stinkhorn fungus from North America – Ravenel's stinkhorn
28. Phallus squamulosus – Brazil
29. Phallus rubicundus – Tropical stinkhorn fungus
30. Phallus tenuissimus – Stinkhorn fungus from Yunnan, China

== Description ==
The immature fruit bodies of Phallus species grow underground, are roughly spherical to ovoid, and have a soft or gelatinous surface. Conspicuous white rhizomorphs extend from the base of this structure and help to anchor it in the soil. The outer tissue layer, or peridium, is white to pale, smooth, firm-membranous. The slimy spore mass, or gleba, is attached to outer surface of the cap, and is colored dark olivaceous to blackish brown. The stalks of Phallus mushrooms are called receptacles: they are upright, cylindrical, hollow, spongy, and bearing roughly bell-shaped cap with irregularly branching ridges on the outer surface. Some species have an indusium, a net-like structure that extends from the cap to the ground. The gleba is slimy and pale greenish-yellow; in several species the gleba has a foul, carrion-like odor, which attracts insects that then help disperse the spores. Mosquitoes, however, that feed on the gleba are killed, suggesting the fungus may contain compounds that could be used as an attractant or biocontrol agent.

The spores of Phallus species are small, ellipsoid, and somewhat translucent (hyaline). The spores of various Phallaceae species, including P. ravenelii has been shown to be smooth and featureless using scanning electron microscopy. Roughened spore surfaces are considered by some mycologists to be an adaptation that results in friction during travel in the air, and increase dispersal distances. Phallus spores are not airborne at any time in their life cycle.

== Distribution and habitat ==
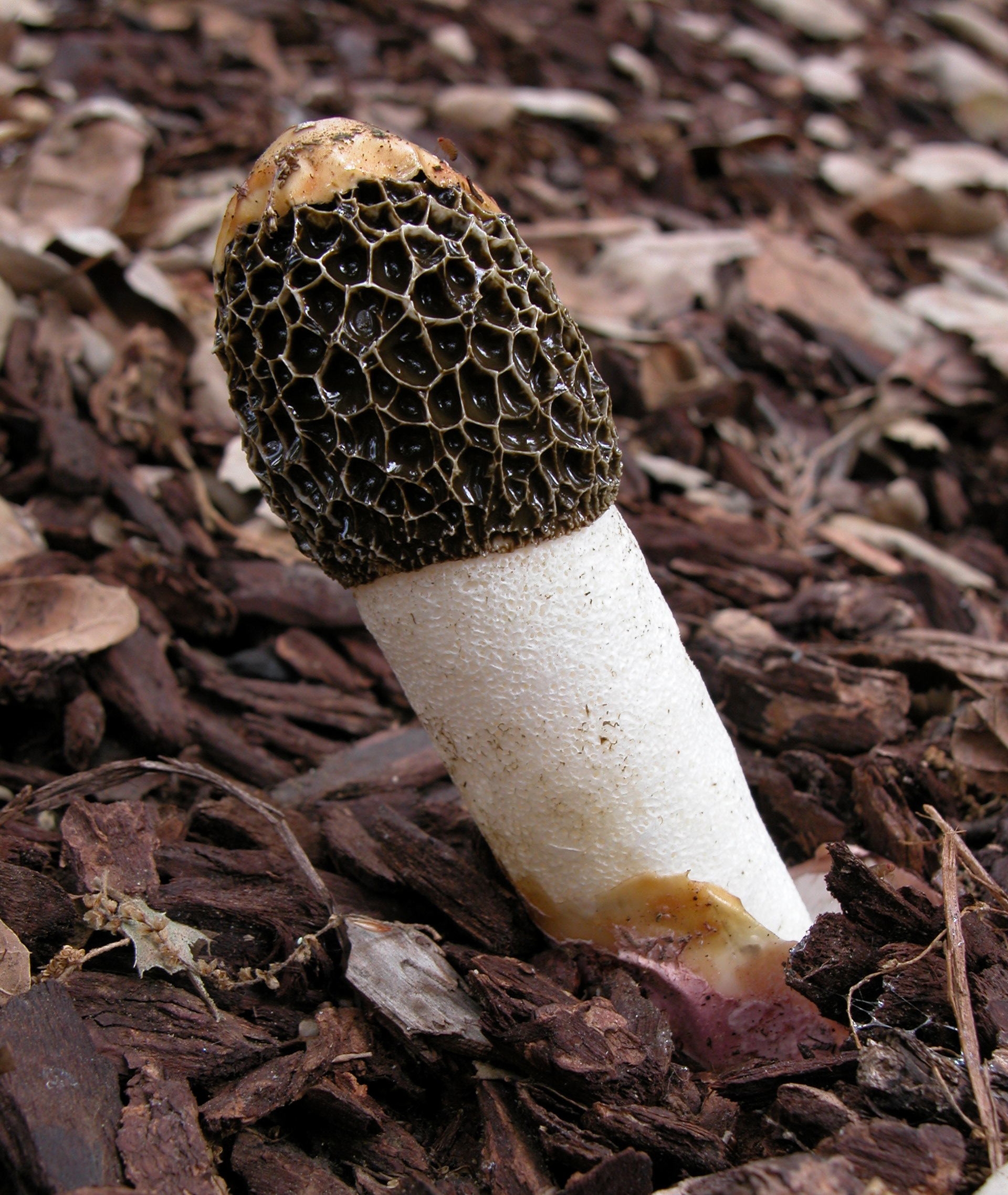
Phallus hadriani

The genus has a cosmopolitan distribution, but with richer species diversity in tropical regions. Phallus mushrooms are found amongst leaf litter in damp woodland with the rhizomorphs attached to buried wood.

== In culture ==
The Yoruba people of Nigeria call stinkhorn mushrooms Akufodewa, a combination of the words ku (die), fun (for), ode (hunter), and a (search). The Yoruban name reflects the belief that hunters, smelling the glebal odor in the forest, may mistake the smell for a dead animal and search for it. Phallus mushrooms are also used by the Yoruba to prepare a charm known as Egbe, which reputedly "has the power of making one invisible in the face of danger." Stinkhorns are also used by the Urhobo and Ibibio people of southeastern Nigeria to prepare "harmful charms". They associate the fungus with the millipede, as is reflected in their names for the mushrooms: the Urhobo call it Uwovwi-rerivwi, from the Urhobo Uwivwi (house), re (of), rivwe (millipede); the Ibido name is Efoketim, from the Ibidio efok (house) and etim (millipede). The Ụkwụànì of Asaba, who associate the stinkhorns with death because of their smell, use the fungus to prepare "harmful charms and charms which confer immunity against evil attacks." They call the mushrooms Oga-egungun, from the Ụkwụànì oga (net or fence) and egungun (dead person).
