= Phallus glutinolens =

Scientific classification
- Kingdom: Fungi
- Division: Basidiomycota
- Class: Agaricomycetes
- Order: Phallales
- Family: Phallaceae
- Genus: Phallus
- Species: P. glutinolens

Binomial name
- Phallus glutinolens (A.Möller) Kuntze (1898)

Synonyms
- Ithyphallus glutinolens Möller (1895)

Stinkhorn fungus from Brazil

Phallus glutinolens is a species of fungus in the stinkhorn family. Found in Brazil, it was described as new to science in 1895 by Friedrich Alfred Gustav Jobst Möller as Ithyphallus glutinolens, and later transferred to the genus Phallus in 1898. The species was emended in 2009.
