= Phallus celebicus =

Scientific classification
- Domain: Eukaryota
- Kingdom: Fungi
- Division: Basidiomycota
- Class: Agaricomycetes
- Order: Phallales
- Family: Phallaceae
- Genus: Phallus
- Species: P. celebicus

Binomial name
- Phallus celebicus Henn. (1900)

Synonyms
- Ithyphallus celebicus (Henn.) Sacc. & P.Syd. (1902)

Stinkhorn fungus from India

Phallus celebicus is a species of fungus in the stinkhorn family. It was described as new to science in 1900 by Paul Christoph Hennings. It is found in India.
