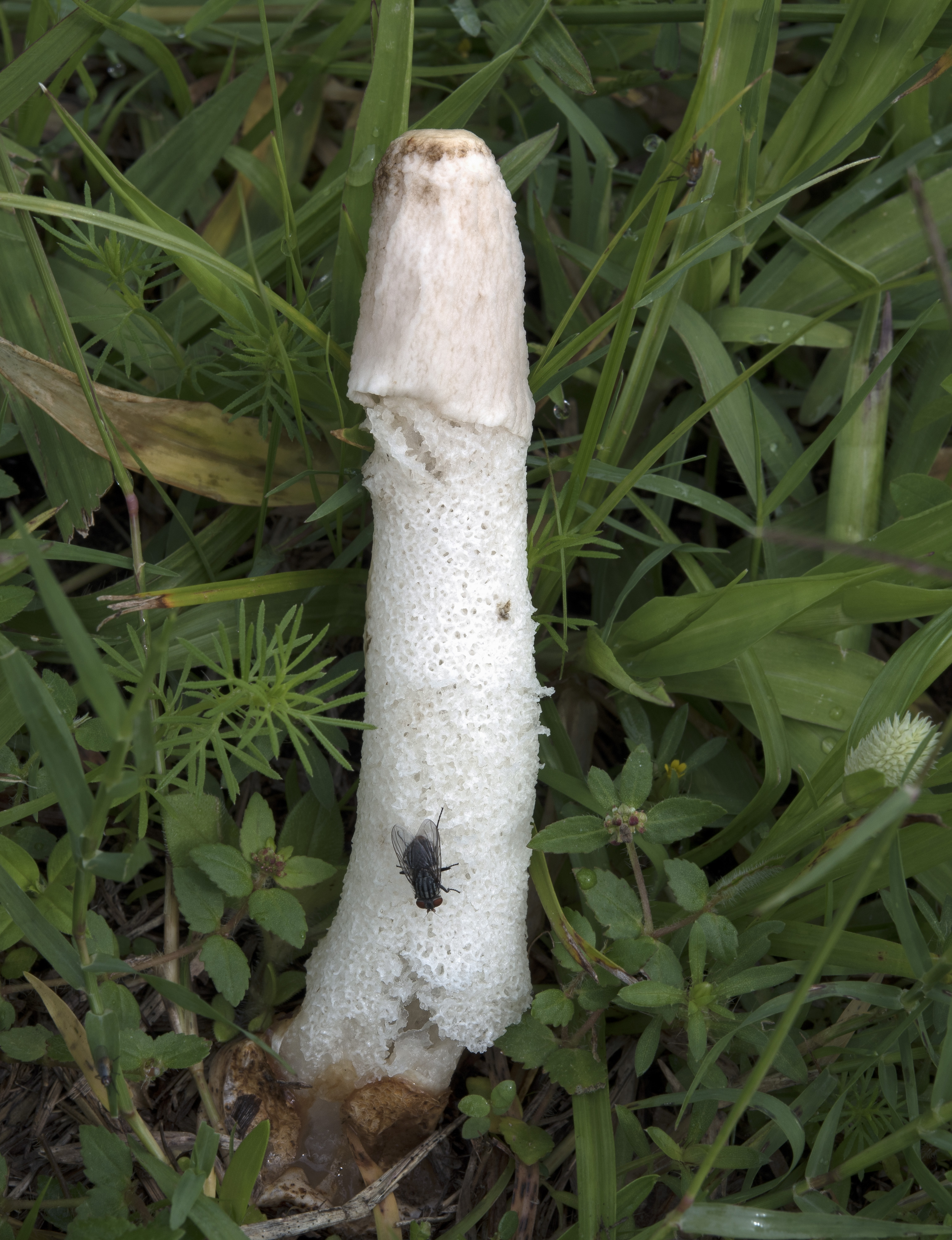

Scientific classification
- Kingdom: Fungi
- Division: Basidiomycota
- Class: Agaricomycetes
- Order: Phallales
- Family: Phallaceae
- Genus: Phallus
- Species: P. granulosodenticulatus

Binomial name
- Phallus granulosodenticulatus B. Braun bis

= Phallus granulosodenticulatus =

Species of fungus

Phallus granulosodenticulatus or more commonly, granular-toothed stinkhorn is a species of fungus belonging to the Phallus genus. It was first described in 1932 by B. Braun bis in São Leopoldo, Brazil.
