= Phallus macrosporus =

Scientific classification
- Domain: Eukaryota
- Kingdom: Fungi
- Division: Basidiomycota
- Class: Agaricomycetes
- Order: Phallales
- Family: Phallaceae
- Genus: Phallus
- Species: P. macrosporus

Binomial name
- Phallus macrosporus B.Liu, Z.Y.Li & Du (1980)

Stinkhorn fungus from China

Phallus macrosporus is a species of fungus in the stinkhorn family. It is found in China.
