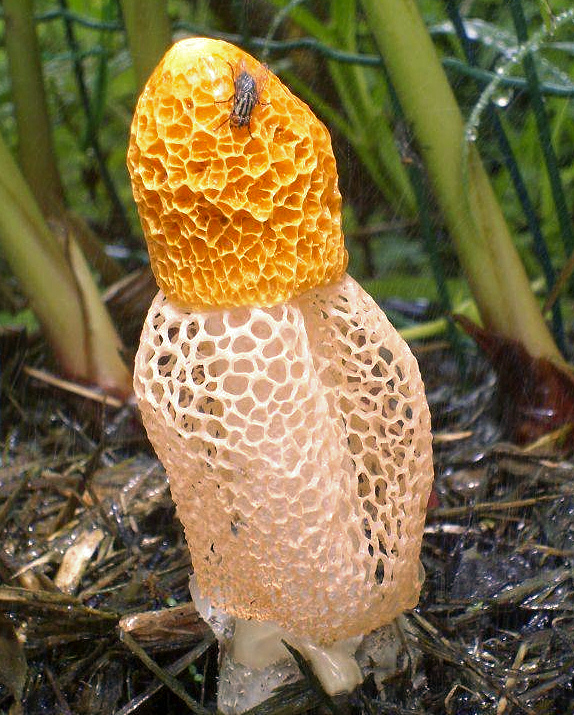
- Phallus multicolor in Nouméa, New Caledonia

Scientific classification
- Kingdom: Fungi
- Division: Basidiomycota
- Class: Agaricomycetes
- Order: Phallales
- Family: Phallaceae
- Genus: Phallus
- Species: P. multicolor

Binomial name
- Phallus multicolor (Berk. & Broome) Cooke (1882)

Synonyms
- Dictyophora multicolor Berk. & Broome (1883)

= Phallus multicolor =

Species of stinkhorn fungus

Phallus multicolor is a species of fungus in the family Phallaceae or "stinkhorns".

== Description and range ==
It is similar in overall appearance to Phallus indusiatus, but it has a more brightly coloured cap, stipe and indusium, and it is usually smaller. It is found in Australia, Guam, Sumatra, Java, Borneo, Papua New Guinea, DRC, and Tobago as well as Hawaii and New Caledonia.

It is typically found in tropical/subtropical climates.

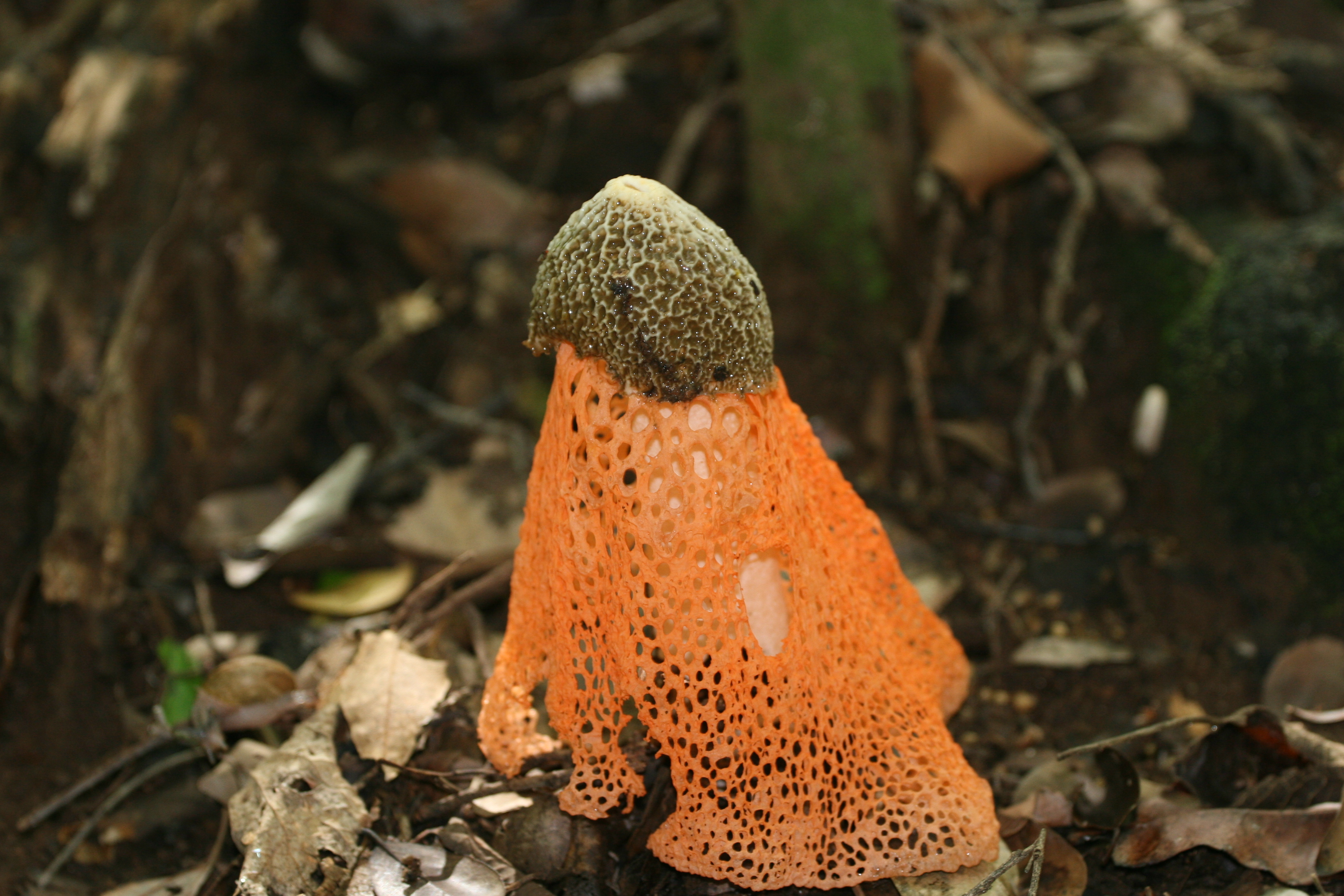
At Kandalama
