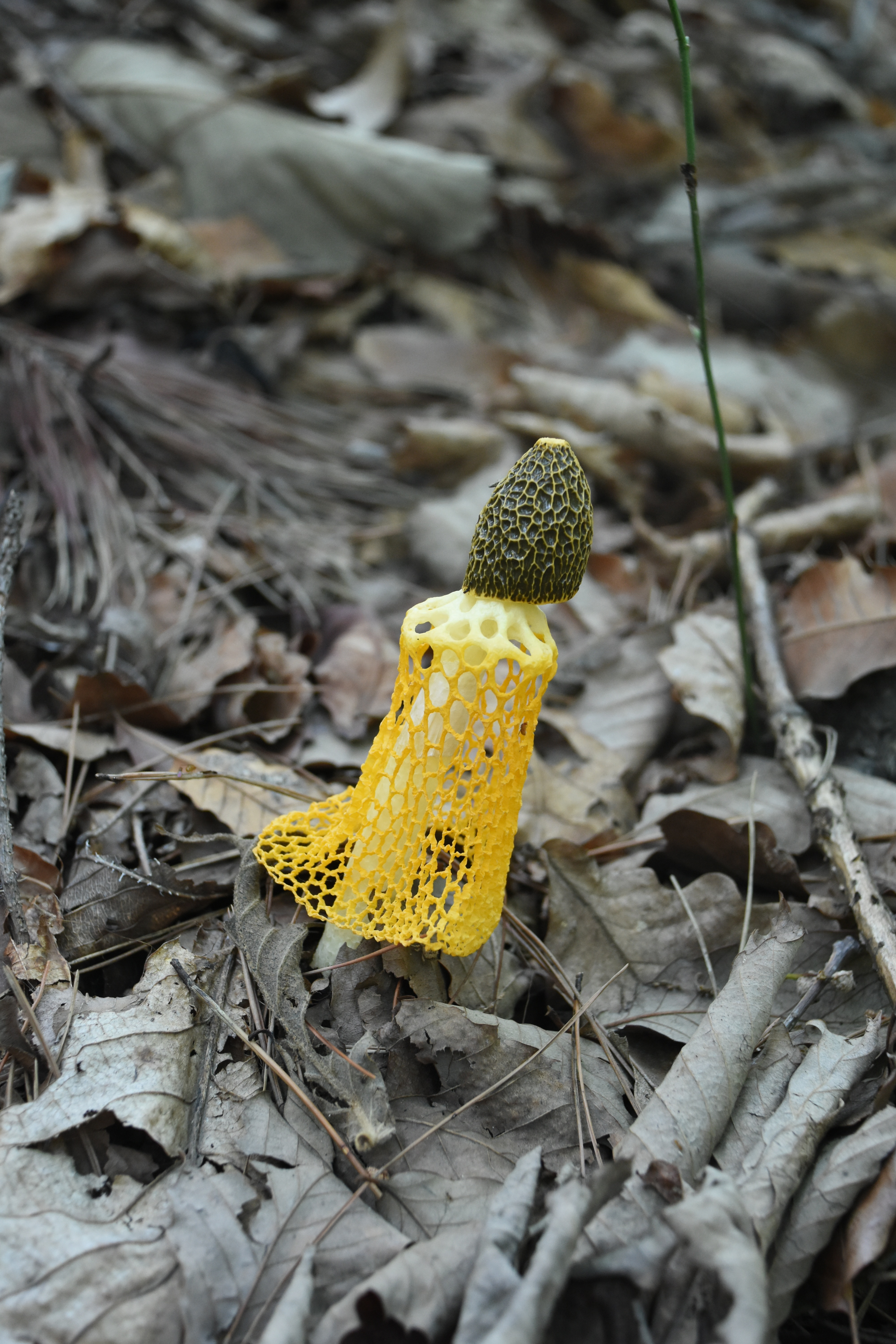
- Phallus luteus, Korea

Scientific classification
- Kingdom: Fungi
- Division: Basidiomycota
- Class: Agaricomycetes
- Order: Phallales
- Family: Phallaceae
- Genus: Phallus
- Species: P. luteus

Binomial name
- Phallus luteus (Liou & L.Hwang) T.Kasuya (2009)

Synonyms
- Dictyophora lutea Liou & L.Hwang (1936); Dictyophora indusiata f. lutea (Liou & L.Hwang) Kobayasi (1965)

= Phallus luteus =

Species of stinkhorn fungus

Phallus luteus or yellow gabion stinkhorn is a species of fungus in the stinkhorn family. First described in 1936 as Dictyophora lutea, it was transferred to the genus Phallus in 2009. It is widely distributed in Asia, including China, Korea, Japan, and India, and has been collected in Mexico.
