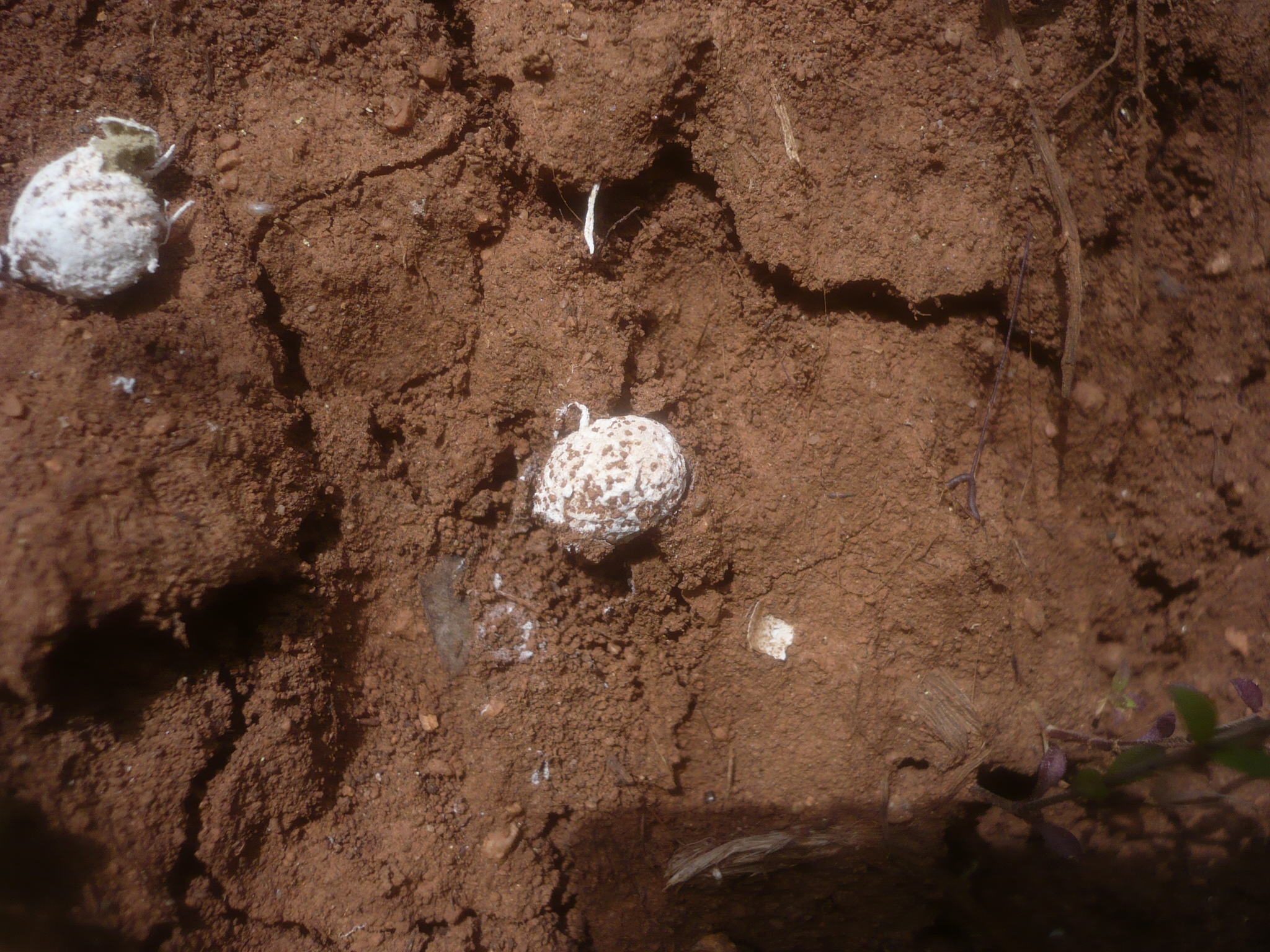
- Gastrosporium simplex

Scientific classification
- Kingdom: Fungi
- Division: Basidiomycota
- Class: Agaricomycetes
- Order: Phallales
- Family: Gastrosporiaceae; Pilát (1934)
- Genus: Gastrosporium; Mattir. (1903)

Type species
- Gastrosporium simplex Mattir. (1903)

Species
- Gastrosporium asiaticum Gastrosporium simplex

Synonyms
- Leucorhizon Velen. (1925)

= Gastrosporium =

Genus of fungi

Gastrosporium is the sole genus in the fungal family Gastrosporiaceae. It contains two truffle-like species, the type G. simplex, and G. asiaticum. Both the family and genus were circumscribed by Italian mycologist Oreste Mattirolo in 1903.
