= Phallus maderensis =

Scientific classification
- Domain: Eukaryota
- Kingdom: Fungi
- Division: Basidiomycota
- Class: Agaricomycetes
- Order: Phallales
- Family: Phallaceae
- Genus: Phallus
- Species: P. maderensis

Binomial name
- Phallus maderensis Calonge (2008)

Stinkhorn fungus from Madeira island

Phallus maderensis is a species of fungus in the stinkhorn family. Found in Madeira island, it was described as new to science in 2005.
