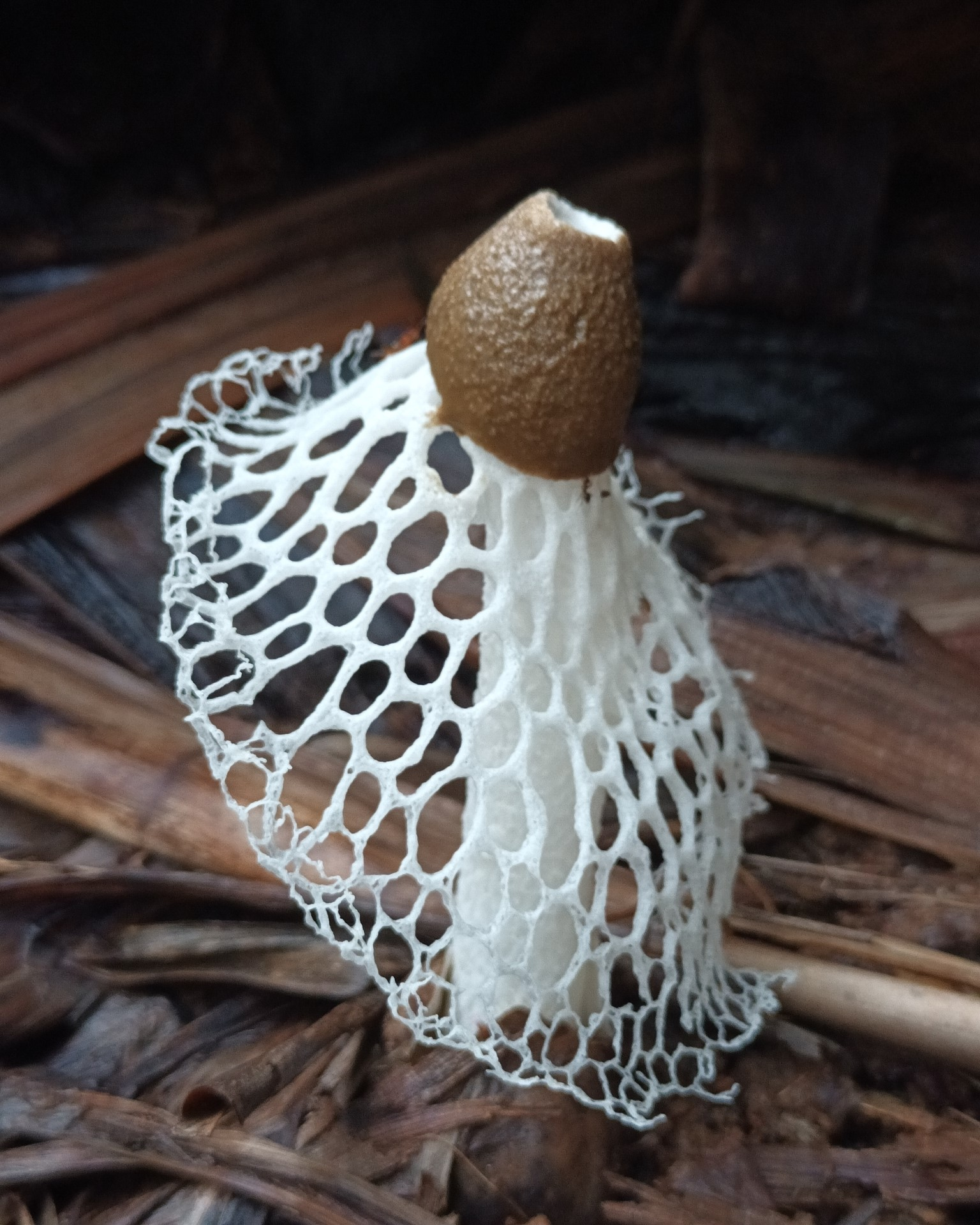
- Phallus atrovolvatus in Kerala, India

Scientific classification
- Domain: Eukaryota
- Kingdom: Fungi
- Division: Basidiomycota
- Class: Agaricomycetes
- Order: Phallales
- Family: Phallaceae
- Genus: Phallus
- Species: P. atrovolvatus

Binomial name
- Phallus atrovolvatus Kreisel & Calonge (2005)

= Phallus atrovolvatus =

Stinkhorn fungus from Costa Rica

Phallus atrovolvatus is a species of fungus in the stinkhorn family. Found in Costa Rica, it was described as new to science in 2005.
