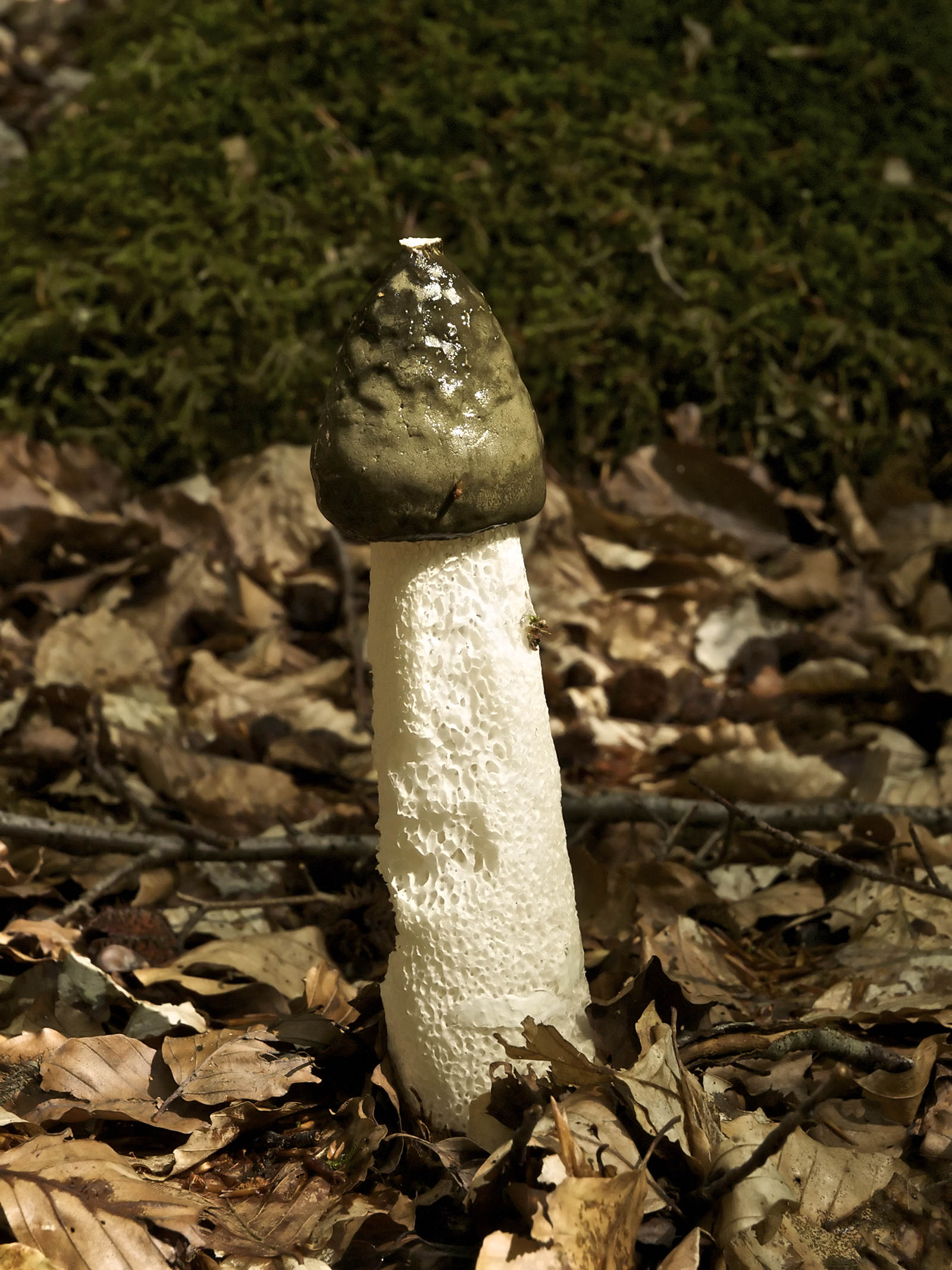

Scientific classification
- Kingdom: Fungi
- Division: Basidiomycota
- Class: Agaricomycetes
- Order: Phallales
- Family: Phallaceae
- Genus: Phallus
- Species: P. impudicus

Binomial name
- Phallus impudicus L. (1753)

Synonyms
- Phallus volvatus Batsch (1783); Phallus foetidus Sowerby (1803); Morellus impudicus (Pers.) Eaton (1818); Ithyphallus impudicus (L.) E.Fischer (1888)

= Phallus impudicus =

Common stinkhorn

Fungus known as the common stinkhorn

Phallus impudicus
- Mycological characteristics
- Glebal hymenium
- Cap is conical
- Hymenium attachment is not applicable
- Stipe is bare
- Ecology is saprotrophic
- Edibility is edible, but unpalatable

Phallus impudicus, known colloquially as the common stinkhorn, is a widespread species of fungus in the Phallaceae (stinkhorn) family. It is recognizable for its foul odor and its phallic shape when mature, the latter feature giving rise to several names in 17th-century England.

It is a common mushroom in Europe and North America, where it occurs in habitats rich in wood debris, such as forests and mulched gardens. It appears from summer to late autumn. The fruiting structure is tall and white with a slimy, dark olive colored conical head. Known as the gleba, this material contains the spores, and is transported by insects which are attracted by the odor—described as resembling carrion.

Despite its foul smell, it is not usually poisonous and immature mushrooms are consumed cooked on their own or feature as an ingredient in cuisines of parts of the Czech Republic, France and Germany.

== Taxonomy ==
The Italian naturalist Ulisse Aldrovandi described the fungus in 1560 with name fungus priapeus, and he depicted it in his series of water-coloured plates called teatro della natura ('nature's theater' 1560–1590). Another botanist, John Gerard called it the "pricke mushroom" or "fungus virilis penis effigie" in his General Historie of Plants of 1597, and John Parkinson referred to it as "Hollanders workingtoole" or "phallus hollandicus" in his Theatrum botanicum of 1640. Linnaeus described it in his 1753 Species Plantarum, and it still bears its original binomial name. Its specific epithet, impudicus, is derived from the Latin for "shameless" or "immodest".

== Description ==
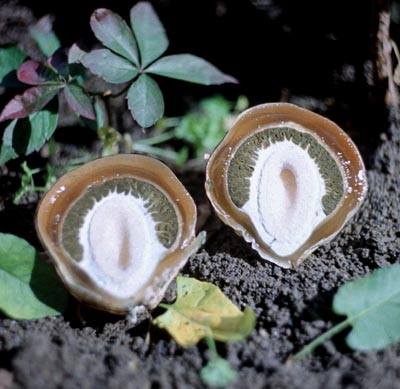
An immature fruiting body ("egg") in longitudinal section

Sometimes called the witch's egg, the immature stinkhorn is whitish or pinkish, egg-shaped, and typically 4 to 6 cm (1 1/2 to 2 1/4 in) by 3 to 5 cm (1 1/4 to 2 in). On the outside is a thick whitish volva, also known as the peridium, covering the olive-colored gelatinous gleba. It is the latter that contains the spores and later stinks and attracts the flies; within this layer is a green layer which will become the 'head' of the expanded fruit body; and inside this is a white structure called the receptaculum (the stalk when expanded), that is hard, but has an airy structure like a sponge. The eggs become fully grown stinkhorns very rapidly, over a day or two.

The mature stinkhorn is 10 to 30 cm (4 to 12 in) tall and 4 to 5 cm (1 1/2 to 2 in) in diameter, topped with a conical cap 2 to 4 cm (3/4 to 1 1/2 in) high that is covered with the greenish-brown slimy gleba. In older fungi the slime is eventually removed, exposing a bare yellowish pitted and ridged (reticulate) surface. This has a passing resemblance to the common morel (Morchella esculenta), for which it is sometimes mistaken. The rate of growth of Phallus impudicus has been measured at 10–15 cm (4–6 in) per hour. The growing fruit body is able to exert up to 1.33 kPa of pressure—a force sufficient to push up through asphalt. The spores have an elliptical to oblong shape, with dimensions of 3–5 to 1.5–2.5 μm.

=== Similar species ===
In North America, P. impudicus can be distinguished from the very similar P. hadriani by the latter's purplish-tinted volva.

== Distribution and habitat ==
The common stinkhorn can be found throughout much of Europe and North America, and it has also been collected in Asia (including China, Taiwan, and India), Costa Rica, Iceland, Tanzania, and southeast Australia. In North America, it is most common west of the Mississippi River; Ravenel's stinkhorn (Phallus ravenelii) is more common to the east. The fungus is associated with rotting wood, and as such it is most commonly encountered in deciduous woods where it fruits from summer to late autumn, though it may also be found in conifer woods or even grassy areas such as parks and gardens. It may also form mycorrhizal associations with certain trees.

== Ecology ==
Unlike many mushrooms which spread their spores through the air, stinkhorns produce a sticky spore mass on their tip which has a sharp, sickly-sweet odor of carrion to attract flies and other insects. Odorous chemicals in the gleba include methanethiol, hydrogen sulfide, linalool, trans-ocimene, phenylacetaldehyde, dimethyl sulfide, and dimethyl trisulfide. The latter compound has been found to be emitted from fungating cancerous wounds. The mature fruiting bodies can be smelled from a considerable distance in the woods, and at close quarters most people find the cloying stink extremely repulsive. The flies land in the gleba and in doing so collect the spore mass on their legs and carry it to other locations.

An Austrian study demonstrated that blow-flies (species Calliphora vicina, Lucilia caesar, Lucilia ampullacea and Dryomyza anilis) also feed on the slime, and soon after leaving the fruit body, they deposit liquid feces that contain a dense suspension of spores. The study also showed that beetles (Oeceoptoma thoracica and Meligethes viridescens) are attracted to the fungus, but seem to have less of a role in spore dispersal as they tend to feed on the hyphal tissue of the fruiting body.

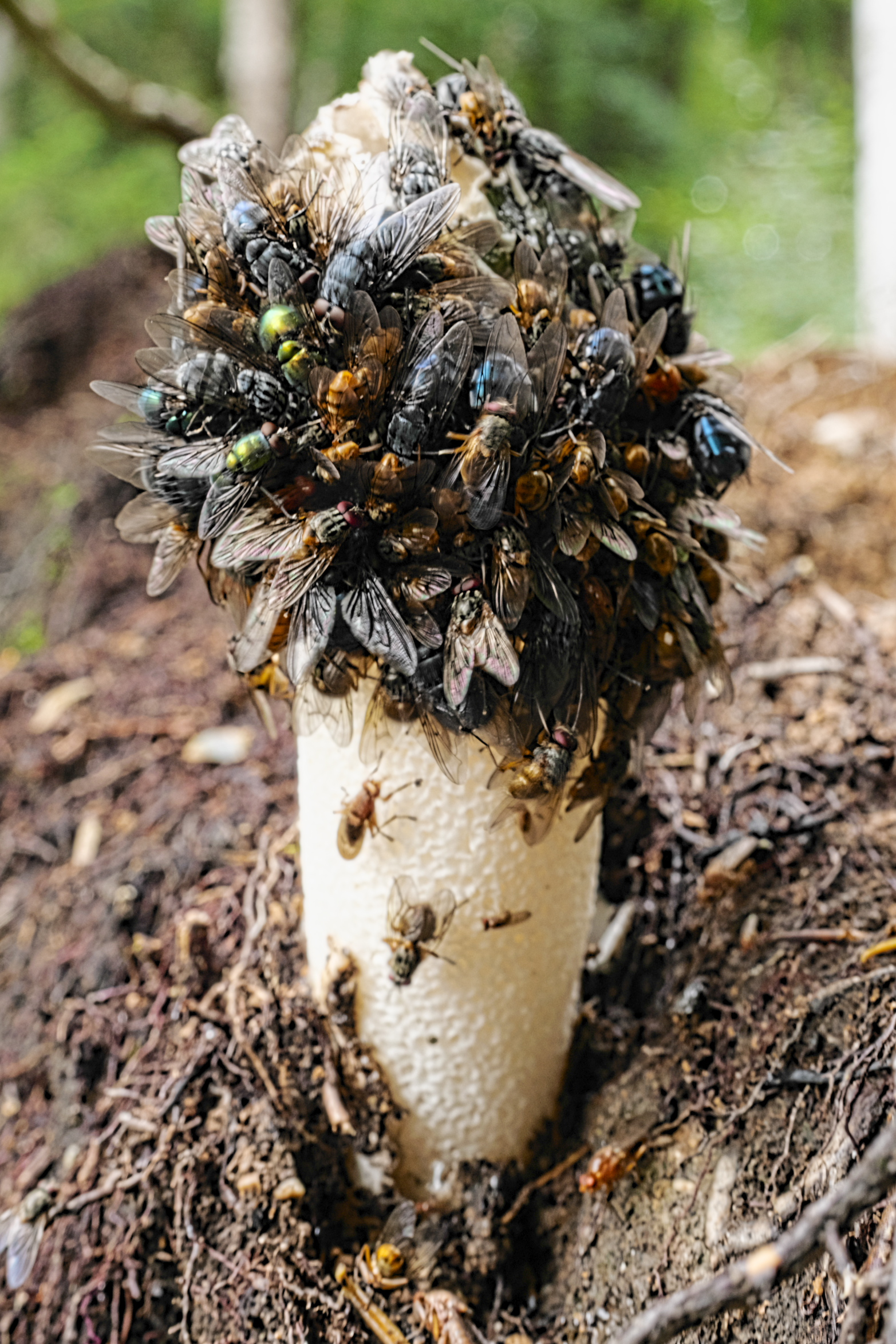
Cap covered by insects

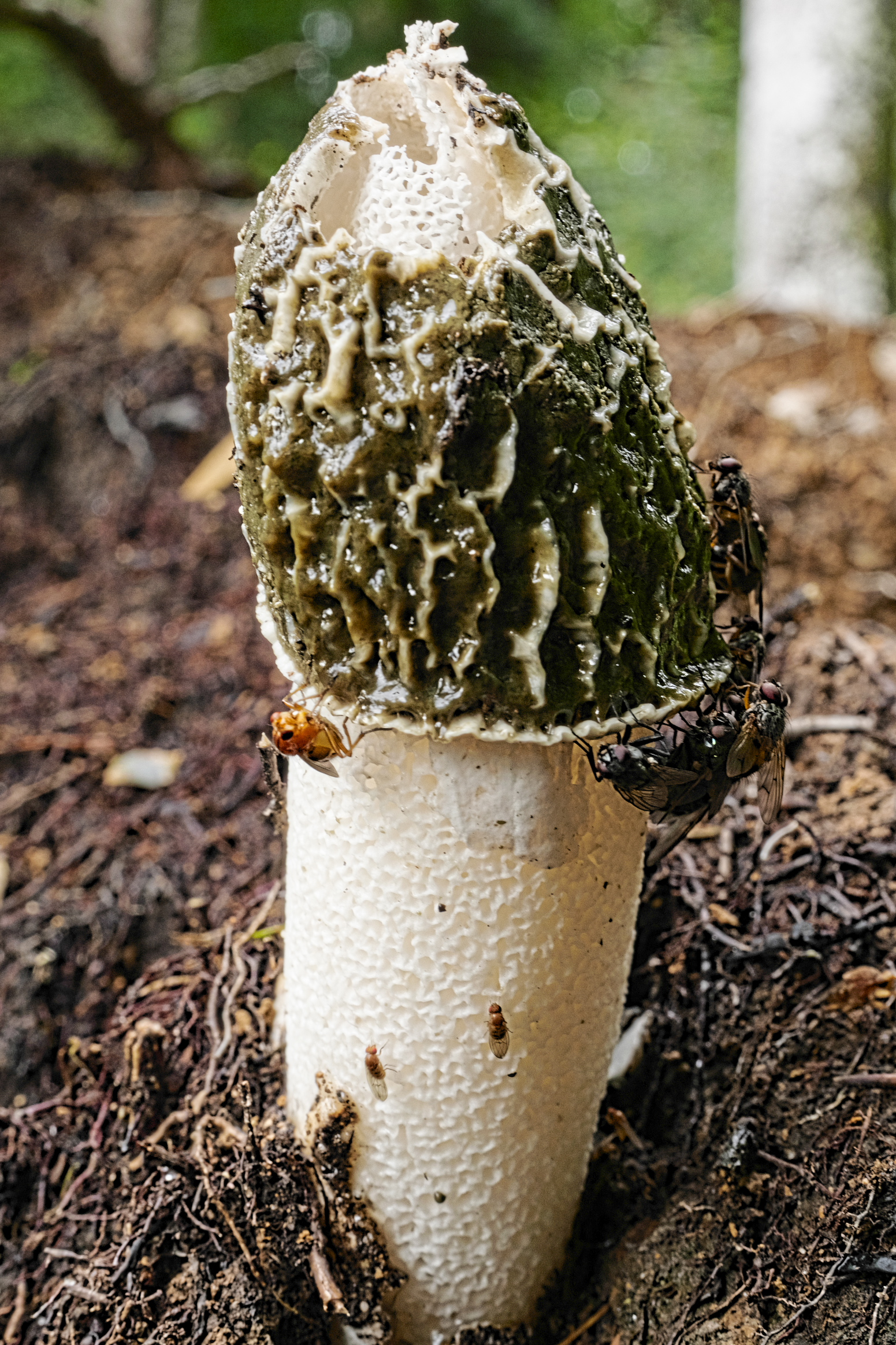
Same specimen not covered by insects

There is also a possible ecological association between the P. impudicus and badger (Meles meles) setts. Fruiting bodies are commonly clustered in a zone 24 to 39 metres (79 to 128 ft) from the entrances; the setts typically harbor a regularly-available supply of badger cadavers. The mortality rate of cubs is high and death is more likely to occur within the sett. The fruiting of large numbers of stinkhorns attracts a high population of blow-flies (Calliphora and Lucilla breed on carrion); this ensures the rapid elimination of badger carcasses, removing a potential source of disease to the badger colony. The laxative effect of the gleba reduces the distance from the fruiting body to where the spores are deposited, ensuring the continued production of high densities of stinkhorns.

== Uses ==
At the egg stage, pieces of the inner layer (the receptaculum) can be cut out with a knife and eaten raw. They are crisp and crunchy with an attractive radishy taste. Some sources differ as to its palatability.

The fungus is enjoyed and eaten in France and parts of Germany, where it may be sold fresh or pickled and used in sausages. Similar species are consumed in China.

=== Medicinal properties ===
Venous thrombosis, the formation of a blood clot in a vein, is a common cause of death in breast cancer patients; patients with recurrent disease are typically maintained on anticoagulants for their lifetimes. A research study has suggested that extracts from P. impudicus can reduce the risk of this condition by reducing the incidence of platelet aggregation, and may have potential as a supportive preventive nutrition. It was used in medieval times as a cure for gout and as a love potion.

== In culture ==
In Northern Montenegro, peasants rub P. impudicus on the necks of bulls before bullfighting contests in an attempt to make them stronger. They are also fed to young bulls as they are thought to be a potent aphrodisiac.

In 1777, the reverend John Lightfoot wrote that the people of Thuringia called the unopened stinkhorns "ghost's or daemon's eggs" and dried and powdered them before mixing them in spirits as an aphrodisiac.

Writing about life in Victorian Cambridge, Gwen Raverat (granddaughter of Charles Darwin) describes the 'sport' of stinkhorn hunting:

In our native woods there grows a kind of toadstool, called in the vernacular The Stinkhorn, though in Latin it bears a grosser name. The name is justified, for the fungus can be hunted by the scent alone; and this was Aunt Etty's great invention. Armed with a basket and a pointed stick, and wearing special hunting cloak and gloves, she would sniff her way round the wood, pausing here and there, her nostrils twitching, when she caught a whiff of her prey; then at last, with a deadly pounce, she would fall upon her victim, and poke his putrid carcass into her basket. At the end of the day's sport, the catch was brought back and burnt in the deepest secrecy on the drawing-room fire, with the door locked; because of the morals of the maids.

In Thomas Mann's novel The Magic Mountain, the psychologist Dr. Krokowski gives a lecture on the species:

And Dr. Krokowski had spoken about one fungus, famous since classical antiquity for its form and the powers ascribed to it – a morel, its Latin name ending in the adjective impudicus, its form reminiscent of love, and its odor, of death. For the stench given off by the impudicus was strikingly like that of a decaying corpse, the odor coming from greenish, viscous slime that carried its spores and dripped from the bell-shaped cap. And even today, among the uneducated, this morel was thought to be an aphrodisiac.

In Danilo Kiš's novel Garden, Ashes, the protagonist's father provokes the suspicions of the local residents and authorities through his mad wandering and sermonizing in the forests:

The story went round, and was preached from the pulpit, that his iron-tipped cane possessed magical powers, that trees withered like grass whenever he walked in the Count's forest, that his spit produced poisonous mushrooms --Ithyphalus impudicus--that grew under the guise of edible, cultivated varieties.
