= Hanns Kreisel =

German mycologist and academic (1931–2017)

- Born: 16 July 1931
- Died: 18 January 2017 (aged 85)
- Scientific career
- Author abbrev. (botany): Kreisel

Hanns Kreisel (16 July 1931 – 18 January 2017) was a German mycologist and professor emeritus.

He was born in Leipzig in 1931. Kreisel was a professor at the University of Greifswald. His field was the classification of fungi, where he has studied this group of organisms not only in Germany but in almost all continents, as in Brazil, Seychelles, Vietnam, Cuba and Syria. He had succeeded with his first collaboration to develop a scientifically sound and current fungal flora of Yemen. Kreisel also specialized in the fungal groups of gut fungi.

Kreisel was also the editor of several international scientific journals. He died in January 2017 at Wolgast.

== Eponymous taxa ==
- Chrysosporium kreiselii Dominik 1965
- Kreiseliella U.Braun 1991
- Kreiseliella typhae (Vasyag.) U.Braun 1991
- Meliola kreiseliana Schmied. 1989
- Passalora kreiseliana U.Braun & Crous 2002
- Peziza kreiselii G.Hirsch 1992
- Puccinia kreiselii M.Scholler 1996
- Tulostoma kreiselii G.Moreno, E.Horak & Altés 2002
