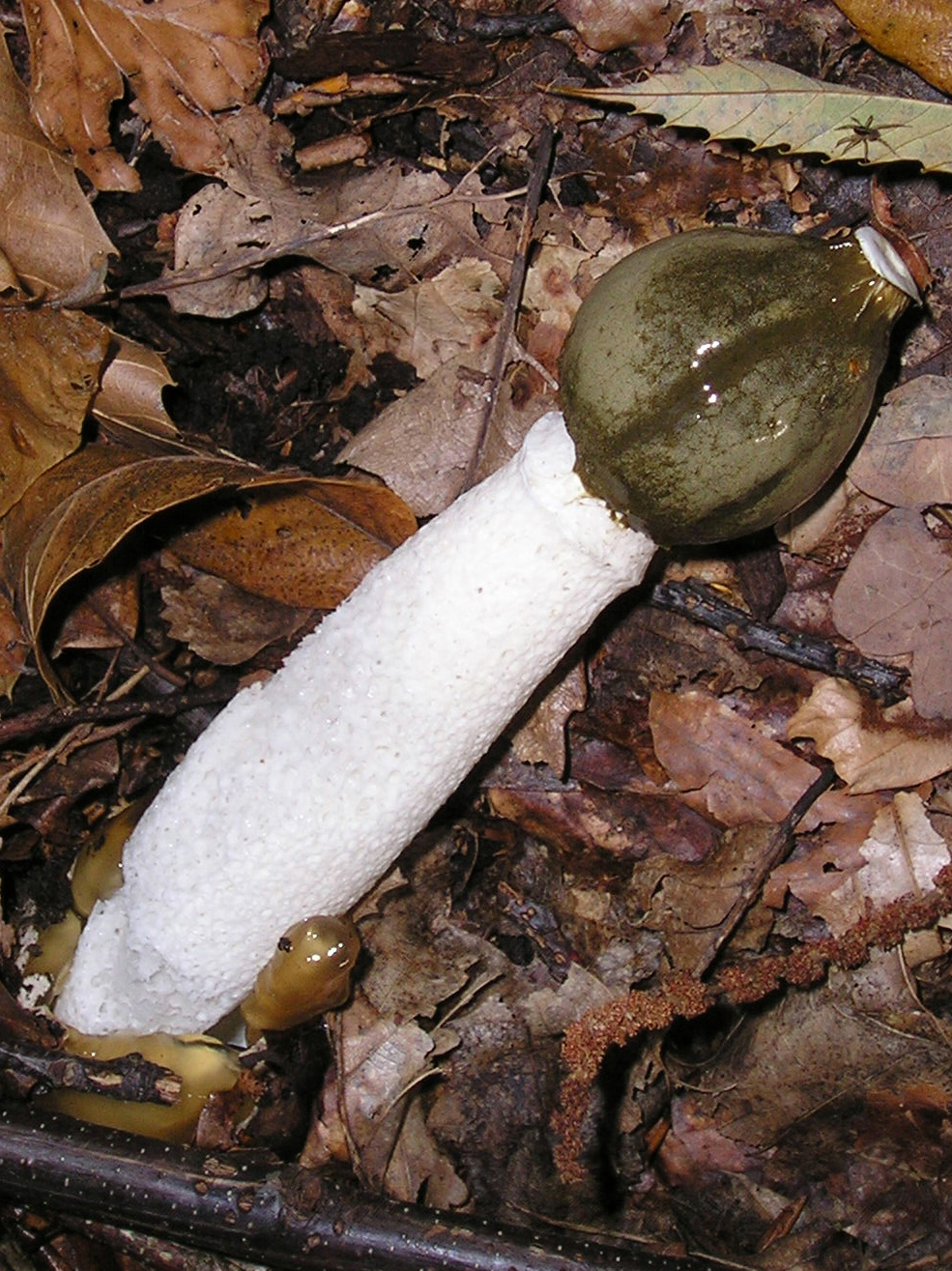
- Common stinkhorn, Phallus impudicus

Scientific classification
- Kingdom: Fungi
- Division: Basidiomycota
- Class: Agaricomycetes
- Subclass: Phallomycetidae
- Order: Phallales; E.Fisch. (1898)

Families
- Claustulaceae; Gastrosporiaceae; Phallaceae

= Phallales =

Order of fungi

The Phallales are an order of fungi in the subclass Phallomycetidae.

== Taxonomy ==
The order contains three families:

- Claustulaceae which include 12 species in 6 genera
- Gastrosporiaceae which include 3 species in a single genus
- Phallaceae which include 180 species across 31 genera

The genera Saprogaster and Vandasia are also included in this order but not yet classified in a family level taxon.

== See also ==
- List of taxa named after human genitals
