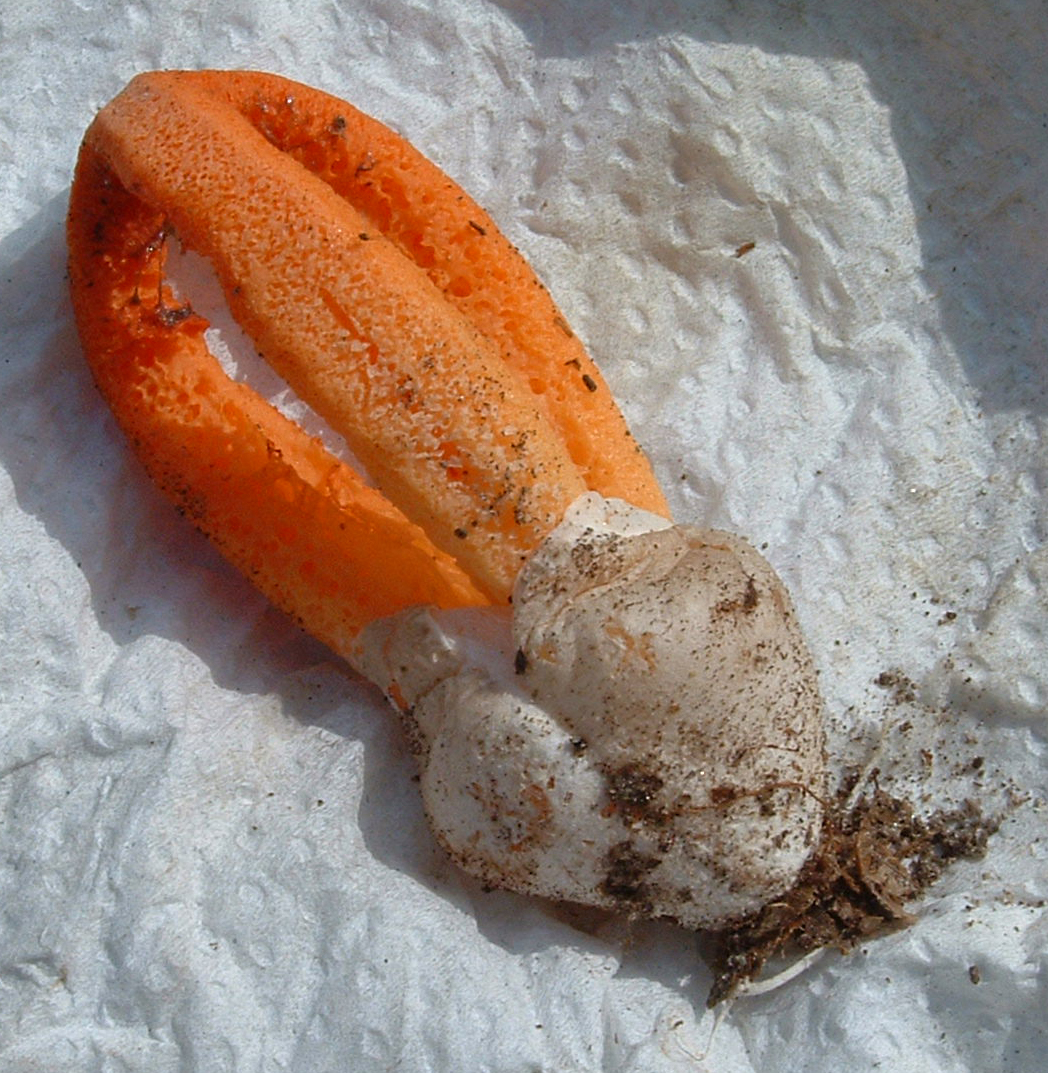

Scientific classification
- Domain: Eukaryota
- Kingdom: Fungi
- Division: Basidiomycota
- Class: Agaricomycetes
- Order: Phallales
- Family: Phallaceae
- Genus: Clathrus
- Species: C. columnatus

Binomial name
- Clathrus columnatus Bosc (1811)

Synonyms
- Laternea columnata (Bosc) Nees (1858); Linderia columnata (Bosc) G.Cunn. (1931); Colonnaria columnata (Bosc) E.Fisch. (1933); Linderiella columnata (Bosc) G.Cunn. (1942)

= Clathrus columnatus =

Species of fungus

Clathrus columnatus Mycological characteristics
- Glebal hymenium
- No distinct cap
- Hymenium attachment is not applicable
- Lacks a stipe
- Spore print is olive-brown
- Ecology is saprotrophic
- Edibility is not recommended or unknown

Clathrus columnatus, commonly known as the column stinkhorn, is a saprobic species of basidiomycete fungus in the family Phallaceae. Similar to other stinkhorn fungi, the fruiting body, known as the receptaculum, starts out as a subterranean "egg" form. As the fungus develops, the receptaculum expands and erupts out of the protective volva, ultimately developing into mature structures characterized by two to five long vertical orange or red spongy columns, joined at the apex. The fully grown receptaculum reaches heights of 8 cm (3 1/4 in) tall. The inside surfaces of the columns are covered with a fetid olive-brown spore-containing slime, which attracts flies and other insects that help disseminate the spores.

The species has a widespread distribution, and has been found in Africa, Australasia, and the Americas. It may have been introduced to North America with exotic plants. Although once considered undesirable, the fungus is listed as edible. It is found commonly in mulch.

== Taxonomy ==
The species was first named by the French botanist Louis Augustin Guillaume Bosc in 1811. Christian Gottfried Daniel Nees von Esenbeck transferred it into Laternea in 1858, a genus intended to accommodate those Clathrus-like species with arms arranged in columns rather than a network; in its current meaning, Laternea includes species that have gleba suspended below the arch of the receptaculum by trabeculae (columns that extend from the peridium to the central core of the receptaculum). Other genera to which the species has been transferred include Linderia by Gordon Herriot Cunningham in 1932, Colonnaria by Eduard Fischer in 1933, and Linderiella by Cunningham in 1942. Colonnaria, Linderia and Linderiella are now considered obsolete genera, as they have been subsumed into Clathrus.

The specific epithet columnatus is Latin, meaning "supported by pillars". The mushroom is commonly known as the "column stinkhorn". Curtis Gates Lloyd wrote in 1906 "in Florida, it is known to the natives as "Dead Men's Fingers". however in recent times Dead Men's Fingers usually refers to Xylaria polymorpha.

== Description ==
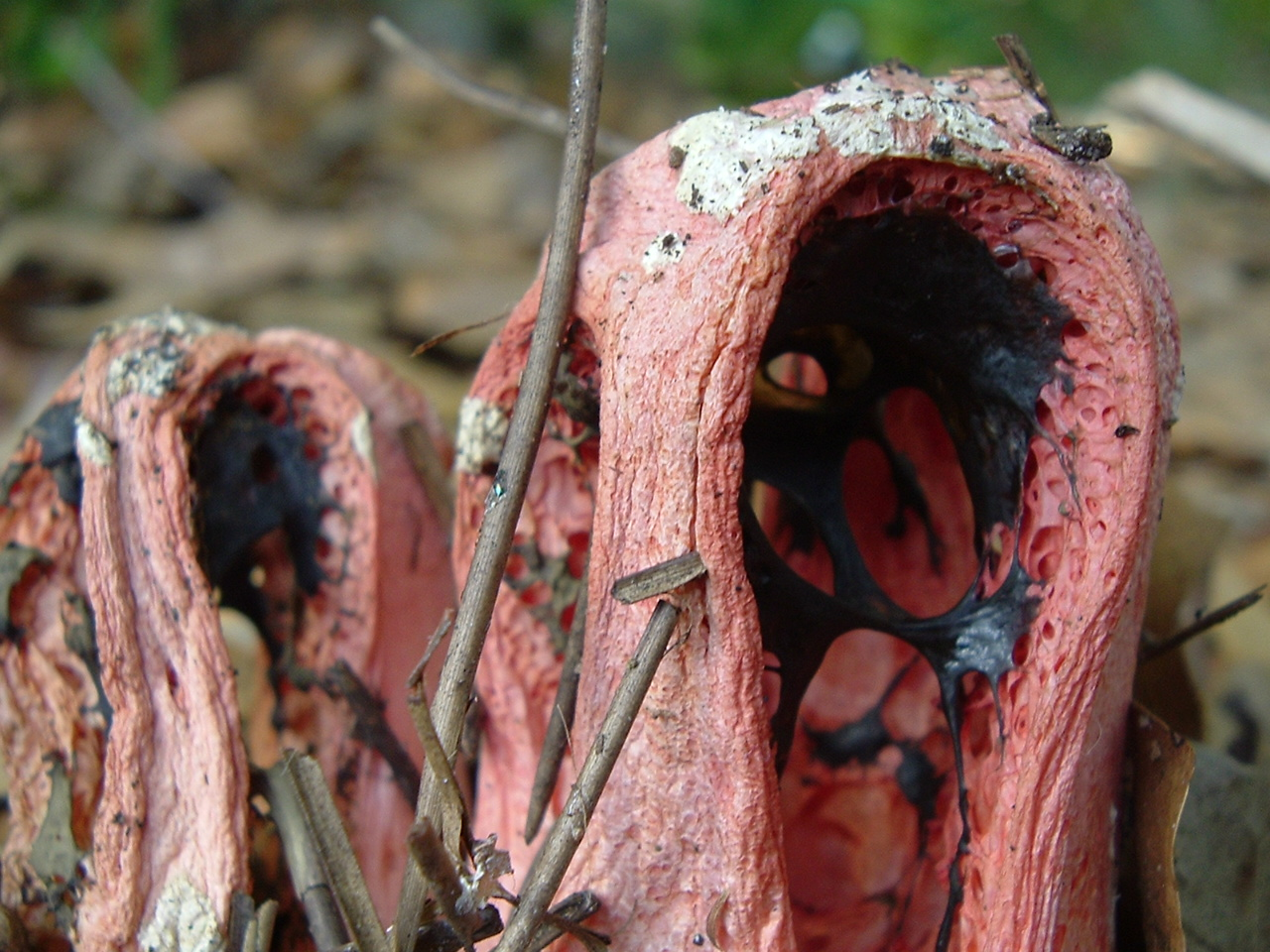
Mature specimens showing the dark-colored gleba

The fruit body, or receptaculum, of Clathrus columnatus consists of two to five (usually four) spongy vertical columns, which are separate where they arise from the volva, but joined at the top in an arch. The columns are joined in pairs; the opposite pairs are joined by a short and broad arch similar in structure to the columns. The columns, which are narrower at the base than above, are reddish-orange above and yellowish-pink below. Young specimens have the fruit body compressed into the small interior space of an "egg", which consists of a peridium that is surrounded by a gelatinous layer that encloses the compressed fruiting body. The egg, usually gray or grayish-brown, typically reaches diameters of 3 to 5 cm (1 1/4 to 2 in) before the columns grow. The volva remains at the base of the fruit body as a thick, loose, whitish sack. The mycelial cords found at the base of the volva are made of two types of tissues: a central bundle of fine hyphae that extend in a longitudinal direction, and an outer cortical layer of coarser hyphae that form a loose but highly interwoven structure. Full-grown columns can extend to 5 to 8 cm (2 to 3 1/4 in) above the ground, a location that optimizes spore dispersal. The fetid-smelling gleba, the spore-bearing mass, is smeared on the upper inner surface of the columns.

The spores are elliptical, smooth, and have dimensions of 3.5–5 by 2–2.5 μm. They have thin walls, and are covered by a transparent envelope.

=== Development ===
The American botanist Edward Angus Burt published a detailed description of the development of C. columnatus in 1896. He found that the egg consists of cortical and medullary systems continued upward from the mycelial strand in the earliest stage. The cortical layer gives rise to the outer layer of the volva, the cortical plates and the pseudoparenchyma (thin-walled, usually angular, randomly arranged cells that are tightly packed) of the receptaculum. The medullary portion gives rise to the gelatinous masses of the gelatinous layer of the volva, to the gleba, and to the gelatinous tissue of the chambers of the receptaculum. The elongation of the receptacle begins at the base and after its elongation, the gleba hangs suspended from the arch of the receptaculum by medullary tissue constituting the chamber masses of the receptacle.

=== Similar species ===
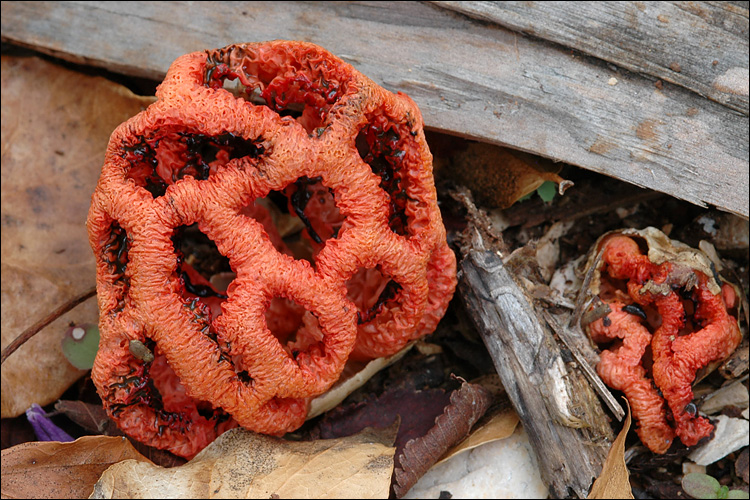
Clathrus ruber

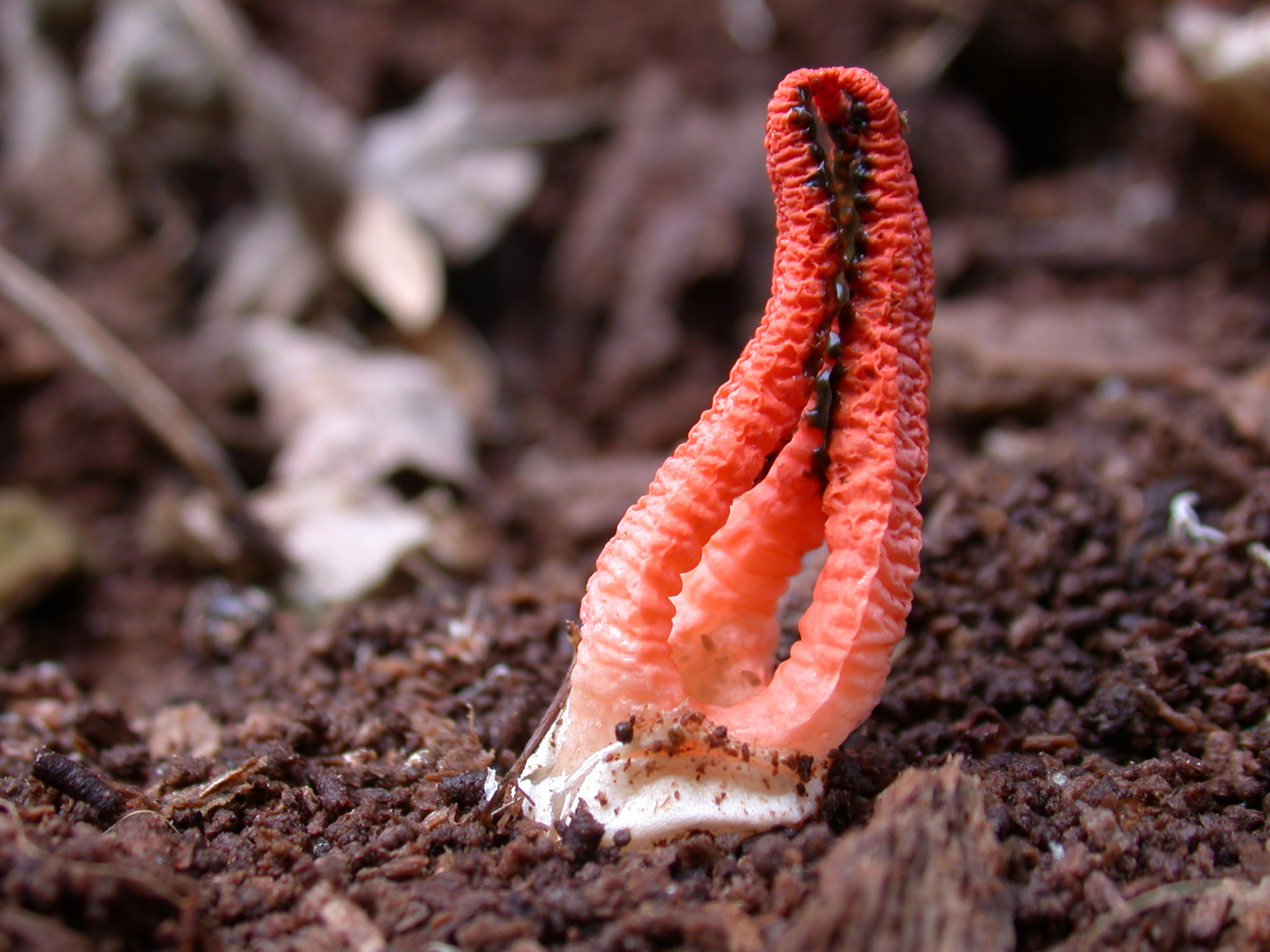
Pseudocolus fusiformis

Pseudocolus fusiformis, Clathrus bicolumnatus, and Clathrus ruber have similarities to Clathrus columnatus. The lattice stinkhorn, C. ruber, has a larger, more globular, lattice-like receptacle. The "stinky squid", P. fusiformis, has arms that are attached at the bases, and free at the top. It grows on rotting logs and chip-mulched soil, in contrast to C. columnatus, which grows on sandy soil. C. bicolumnatus has a smaller stature (up to 9 cm tall), and only has two columns. Laternea dringii is also much smaller.

== Habitat and distribution ==
Like all Phallaceae species, C. columnatus is saprobic, and uses extracellular digestion to acquire nutrients from dead and decaying organic matter, like wood. As a consequence of its predilection for dead wood, the fungus is often associated with disturbed habitats. It can often be found growing in and around gardens and residences where areas of cultivation or landscaping have resulted in accumulations of mulch, wood chips or other cellulose-rich materials. The mycelial cords can be traced to buried roots, stumps, and other woody material. The species grows in sandy soil, near woody debris, in lawns, gardens, and cultivated soil. Fruit bodies appear singly, or scattered, and can arise in the summer, autumn, and early winter, especially after wet weather.

The fungus has been collected in Oceania (including New Zealand and New Guinea), Africa, China, and North and South America. In China, it is found in Jiangsu, Fujian, and Guangdong. The North American distribution extends north to New York and south to Mexico as well as Costa Rica; it is also in Hawaii. The fungus is less common in the southeastern and southern United States. It is thought to have been introduced to North America, as it typically appear in landscaped areas or other locations where exotic plants have been established.

Australian mycologist Tom May points out that a reported distribution in Australia is "presumably erroneous", being based on only a single collection in 1948.

== Ecology ==
Like other member of the family Phallaceae, the mature fungus attracts insects with its smell to help disperse its spores. Psilopyga fasciata, a stinkhorn beetle of the sap beetle family, has been recorded feeding on the gleba of Mexican specimens.

== Toxicity ==
The words of William Gilson Farlow, published in 1890, serve as a warning to those who might be inclined to consume Clathrus columnatus: "The odor of fully grown specimens of the order Phalloidea is so repulsive that the question as to their poisonous character when eaten by men has often been the subject of experiment." Farlow described two cases of poisoning, one involving a young girl "who ate a small piece of the fungus, and was seized with violent convulsions followed by loss of speech and a deep sleep lasting 52 hours"; the other case involved hogs that ate the fungus found in patches in oak woods, and died 12–15 hours later.

== Uses ==
Despite the early report of poisoning, Orson K. Miller, Jr. considers the egg's taste mild and lists the species as edible.
