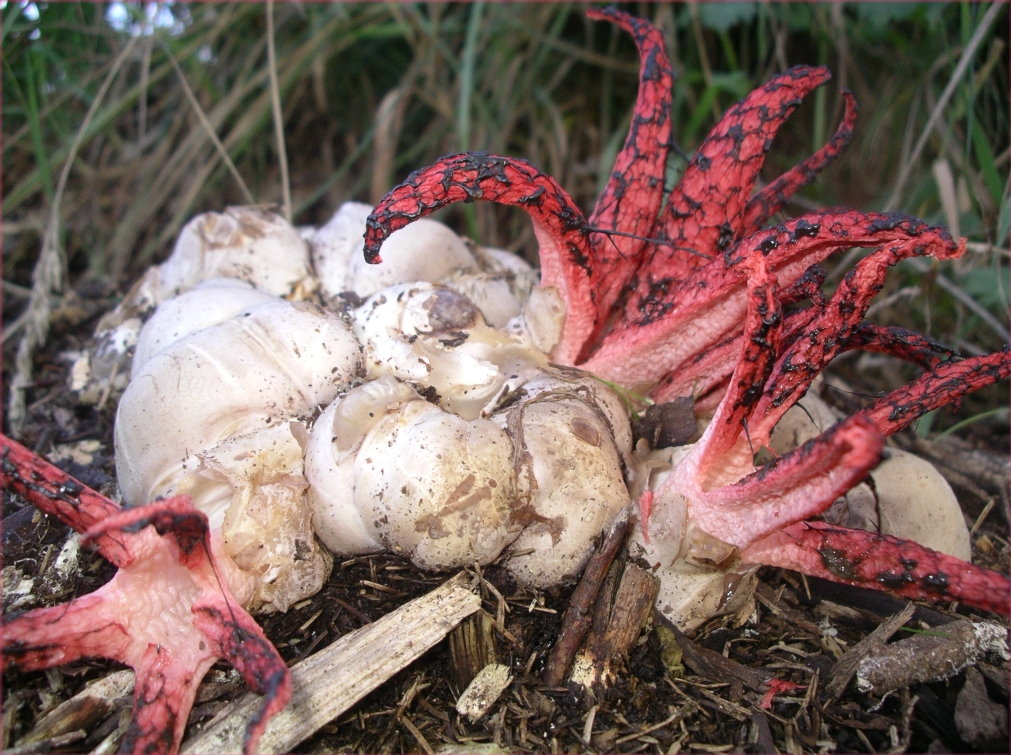
- C. archeri bursting from the eggs

Scientific classification
- Kingdom: Fungi
- Division: Basidiomycota
- Class: Agaricomycetes
- Order: Phallales
- Family: Phallaceae
- Genus: Clathrus
- Species: C. archeri

Binomial name
- Clathrus archeri (Berk.) Dring 1980

Synonyms
- Synonymy: Lysurus archeri Berk.; Anthurus archeri E.Fisch.; Pseudocolus archeri Lloyd; Lysurus pentactinus Berk.; Anthurus mullerianus Kalchbr.; Anthurus mullerianus var. aseroeformis E.Fisch.; Aseroephallus archeri Kuntze; Anthurus sepioides McAlpine; Anthurus aseroeformis (E.Fisch.) McAlpine; Anthurus macowanii Marloth; Anthurus aseroeformis var. longipes R.Maire; Anthurus aseroeformis var. brevipes R.Maire

= Clathrus archeri =

Species of fungus

Clathrus archeri
- Mycological characteristics
- Glebal hymenium
- Lacks a stipe
- Spore print is olive-brown
- Ecology is saprotrophic
- Edibility is not recommended

Clathrus archeri, commonly known as octopus stinkhorn or devil's fingers, is a species of fungus in the family Phallaceae. First described by Miles Joseph Berkeley in 1859 from specimens collected in Tasmania, its current binomial name, Clathrus archeri, was established in 1980.

The fruiting bodies undergo two stages: they first resemble white eggs from which four to eight arms later emerge, reaching up to 10 cm (4 in) in length. The arms are pinkish-red in colour and covered in a gelatinous, dark-olive mass of spores called gleba. In maturity, the fruiting bodies smell like rotten meat, attracting flies and other insects that feed on the gleba and spread the spores. Clathrus archeri is edible, but accounts of its taste vary.

Although the native range of C. archeri is disputed, it is found in Africa, Australia, and New Zealand, and has since spread to Europe, North America, and South America, potentially qualifying it as an invasive species. C. archeri occurs on a variety of soil types, but prefers acidic and humid soils, and commonly fruits on mulch and forest litter.

== Taxonomy ==
- - - Aseroe rubra
    - Clathrus archeri
  - Clathrus ruber
  - - Laternea triscapa
    - Clathrus chrysomycelinus

Phylogeny and relationships of C. archeri and selected Phallaceae species based on ribosomal DNA sequences.

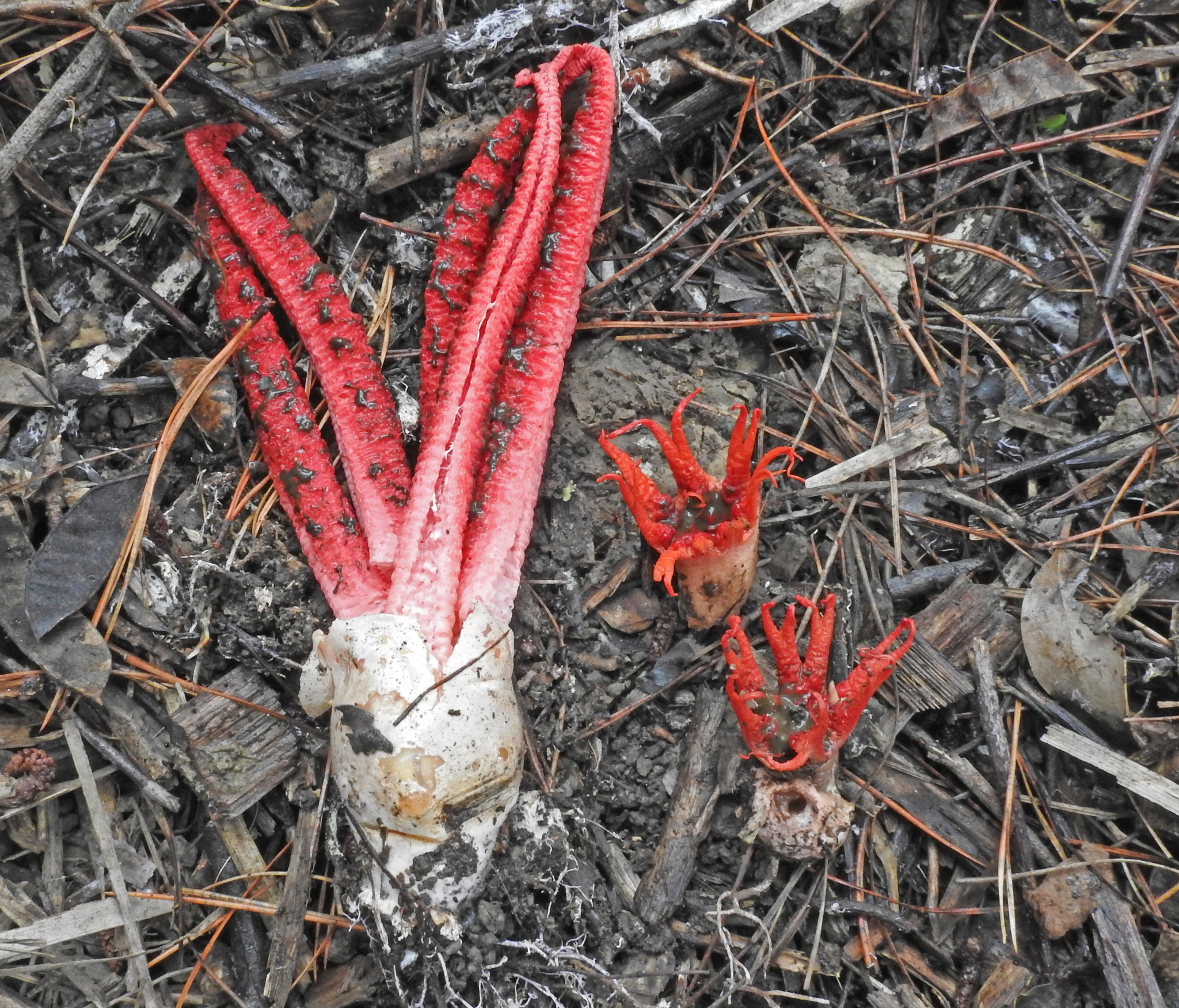
Comparison of Clathrus archeri (left) and Aseroe rubra (right), showing differences in size and gleba placement.

Clathrus archeri was first described in 1859 by Miles Joseph Berkeley from specimens collected in Tasmania. It received its current binomial name, Clathrus archeri, in 1980. The species has 12 recognised synonyms. A 2006 molecular analysis of about 40 Phallales species found that C. archeri belongs to a clade containing Aseroe rubra, Clathrus ruber, Laternea triscapa, and Clathrus chrysomycelinus. New Zealand mycologist Jerry Cooper noted in 2020 that "the phylogenetic data do not support the inclusion of this species [Clathrus archeri] in the genus Clathrus", instead recommending the name Anthurus archeri.

=== Etymology ===
The genus name Clathrus is derived from Ancient Greek κλειθρον, meaning 'lattice'. The specific epithet, archeri, is named in honour of the Australian architect William Archer. The species is commonly known as the 'devil's fingers' or 'octopus stinkhorn'. Other sources also refer to the fungus as the 'devil's mushroom', 'cuttlefish stinkhorn', 'stinkopus' or 'squidward mushroom'.

== Description ==
Clathrus archeri grows in two distinct stages, first an egg stage followed by the fungal arms emerging. In the first stage, it forms a white, spherical, ovoid, or egg-shaped structure, usually 3–4 cm (1.2–1.6 in) tall, with thread-like mycelium at the base. Next, between four and eight pinkish-red arms emerge from the egg. Each arm can grow up to 10 cm (4 in) in length, and their upper surfaces are coated in dark greenish-brown, spore-bearing gleba that becomes black when dry. Fruiting bodies have a lifespan of a day or two. The spores are elliptical, smooth, and 3.5–6 × 1.5–2 μm in size. Sisson (2023) notes the peak season of the fungus in New Zealand is from October to June.

Clathrus archeri is sometimes confused with the species Aseroe rubra. It differs from A. rubra in its larger size and the presence of gleba along the arms; in A. rubra, the gleba is confined to the central area. C. archeri also generally has thick, unfused arms, although the tips are sometimes fused before maturity.

In laboratory settings, C. archeri was found to grow best at 26 °C (79 °F) on a compost agar medium with a pH of 6.0. Under these conditions, the thallus grew at a radial rate of up to 2.9 mm (0.11 in) per day over a period of four weeks. C. archeri produces white mycelium which eventually turns pink. The surface of the hyphae secretes calcium oxalate crystals, which are hypothesised to create a protective hydrophobic layer around the hyphae.

=== Edibility ===
Some authors regard C. archeri as inedible, but others consider the fungus edible and have experimented with eating the fungus in its young stage. American mycologist David Arora recounts that the young eggs, which are contained in a gelatinous layer of spore mucilage, left an aftertaste for hours. Arora says the flavour "wasn't bad" and describes the texture as "slippery". Another source from 2001 says that the fungus is edible in its young stage but that the smell and taste are unpleasant.

== Distribution and habitat ==
=== Distribution ===
The native distribution range of Clathrus archeri is disputed. Johnson & Jürgens (2010) list Africa and Australasia as the species' native range, while Pietras et al. (2021) and consider the species native only to Australia and New Zealand. New Zealand mycologist Jerry Cooper claims that the species was introduced to New Zealand from Australia and that it was considered uncommon in both countries in the 1930s. Cooper also writes that "it is quite possible that neither Australia or New Zealand represent the indigenous range of this species".

The species has been present in Europe since the early 20th century, after first being discovered in 1914 in Britain and France. (Note: Another source, Levačić & Jelaska (2025), claims the fungus was first reported in Europe in 1920.) The fungus was presumably introduced to Europe from Australian wool imports or in supplies for World War I. It initially spread from France to Belgium, and later to Austria, Germany, Switzerland, and Italy; more recently, C. archeri has been recorded in Bosnia and Herzegovina, Czechia, Croatia, Poland, Slovenia, Romania, and Ukraine. The fungus has also been recorded in South America and Madagascar. In regions outside its native range, C. archeri is considered potentially invasive as defined by the International Union for Conservation of Nature, but its impacts on native ecosystems are unknown.

=== Habitat ===
As a saprotroph, C. archeri decays dead organic material. C. archeri occurs on a variety of soil types and commonly fruits on mulch and forest litter, but does not grow in calcareous soils. In Australia and New Zealand, the fungus has been observed fruiting on woody debris from Eucalyptus and Nothofagus trees. C. archeri appears to have a preference toward acidic and humid soils. C. archeri is commonly found in urban areas, such as gardens and parks, where it may have spread via transported wood chips and mulch.

== Ecology ==
The fruiting bodies of C. archeri use flies and other insects to disperse their spores. These insects are attracted to the putrid smell of the fungus, described as "rotten meat" by Piętka, Byk & Byk (2021) and other authors, and consume the spore-bearing gleba on the arms. The spores later germinate after being excreted by the insects. Johnson & Jürgens (2010) reported insects from three families as visitors to C. archeri: Calliphoridae, Muscidae, and Sarcophagidae. The strategy of attracting flies by mimicking the smell of carrion is referred to as sapromyiophily and is shared by other members of the family Phallaceae. Multiple lineages of flowering plants have independently evolved the same strategy to attract pollinators, an example of convergent evolution across taxonomic kingdoms.

== Works cited ==
Books

- Arora, David (1986) [1979]. Mushrooms Demystified: A Comprehensive Guide to the Fleshy Fungi (2nd ed.). Berkeley, California: Ten Speed Press. ISBN 978-0-89815-170-1.
- Bessette, Alan E.; Bessette, Arleen Rainis; Roody, William C.; Smith, Dianna G. (2025). Puffballs, Earthstars, Stinkhorns, and Other Gasteroid Fungi of Eastern North America. Austin: University of Texas Press. ISBN 978-1-4773-3126-2.
- Rea, C. (1922). British Basidiomycetes: A Handbook to the Larger British Fungi. Cambridge, UK: Cambridge University Press.
- Sisson, Liv (2023). Fungi of Aotearoa: A Curious Forager's Field Guide. Auckland, New Zealand: Penguin Books. p. 263. ISBN 978-1-76104-787-9.

Journals

- Arora, David; Burk, William R. (1982). "Clathrus Archeri, A Stinkhorn New to North America". Mycologia. 74 (3): 501–504. doi:10.1080/00275514.1982.12021535. ISSN 0027-5514.
- Bîrsan, Ciprian; Mardari, Constantin; Copoţ, Ovidiu; Tănase, Cătălin (2021). "Modelling the potential distribution and habitat suitability of the alien fungus Clathrus archeri in Romania". Botanica Serbica. 45 (2): 241–250. doi:10.2298/BOTSERB2102241B.
- Bîrsan, Ciprian; Cojocariu, Ana; Cenuşă, Elena (2014). "Distribution and Ecology of Clathrus archeri in Romania". Notulae Scientia Biologicae. 6 (3). Society of Land Measurements and Cadastre from Transylvania: 288–291. doi:10.15835/nsb639389. ISSN 2067-3264.
- Dring, D. M. (1980). "Contributions towards a Rational Arrangement of the Clathraceae". Kew Bulletin. 35 (1). Springer, Royal Botanic Gardens, Kew: 1–97. ISSN 0075-5974. JSTOR 4117008.
- Hosaka, K.; Bates, S. T.; Beever, R. E.; Castellano, M. A.; Colgan, W.; Dominguez, L. S.; Nouhra, E. R.; Geml, J.; Giachini, A. J.; Kenney, S. R.; Simpson, N. B.; Spatafora, J. W.; Trappe, J. M. (1 November 2006). "Molecular phylogenetics of the gomphoid-phalloid fungi with an establishment of the new subclass Phallomycetidae and two new orders". Mycologia. 98 (6): 949–959. doi:10.3852/mycologia.98.6.949. ISSN 0027-5514.
- Johnson, S.D.; Jürgens, A. (2010). "Convergent evolution of carrion and faecal scent mimicry in fly-pollinated angiosperm flowers and a stinkhorn fungus". South African Journal of Botany. 76 (4). Elsevier BV: 796–807. doi:10.1016/j.sajb.2010.07.012. ISSN 0254-6299.
- Levačić, Damjana; Jelaska, Sven D. (2025). "Past, present and future of an alien fungus Clathrus archeri in Croatia". Acta botanica Croatica. 84 (2): 193–201. doi:10.37427/botcro-2025-017.
- Mykchaylova, Oksana; Lomberg, Margarita; Tsapko, Sofiia; Krasinko, Victorya (31 January 2022). "Morphological Characteristics of the Culture Clathrus archeri (Phallaceae, Basidiomycota)" (PDF). Polish Journal of Natural Science. 36 (3). De Gruyter Brill: 283–298. ISSN 1643-9953.
- Pietras, Marcin; Kolanowska, Marta; Selosse, Marc-André (2021). "Quo vadis? Historical distribution and impact of climate change on the worldwide distribution of the Australasian fungus Clathrus archeri (Phallales, Basidiomycota)". Mycological Progress. 20 (3): 299–311. doi:10.1007/s11557-021-01669-w. ISSN 1617-416X.
- Piętka, Jacek; Byk, Damian; Byk, Adam (2021). "Octopus stinkhorn Clathrus archeri (Berk.) Dring, an alien stinkhorn fungus (Phallaceae), in north-eastern Poland". Baltic Forestry. 27 (2). Baltic Forestry. doi:10.46490/bf574. ISSN 2029-9230.

Websites

- Cooper, Jerry (11 November 2020). "Mycological Notes 41: The Phallales (Stinkhorns) in New Zealand" (PDF). Fungal Network of New Zealand. Archived (PDF) from the original on 4 July 2026.
- Long, Graham (23 September 2017). "Country diary: sci-fi fungus flourishes in the forest". The Guardian. Archived from the original on 5 July 2026.
- "Clathrus archeri (Berk.) Dring, Kew Bull. 35(1): 29 (1980)". Species Fungorum. 2026. Archived from the original on 27 November 2024 – via Royal Botanic Gardens, Kew.
