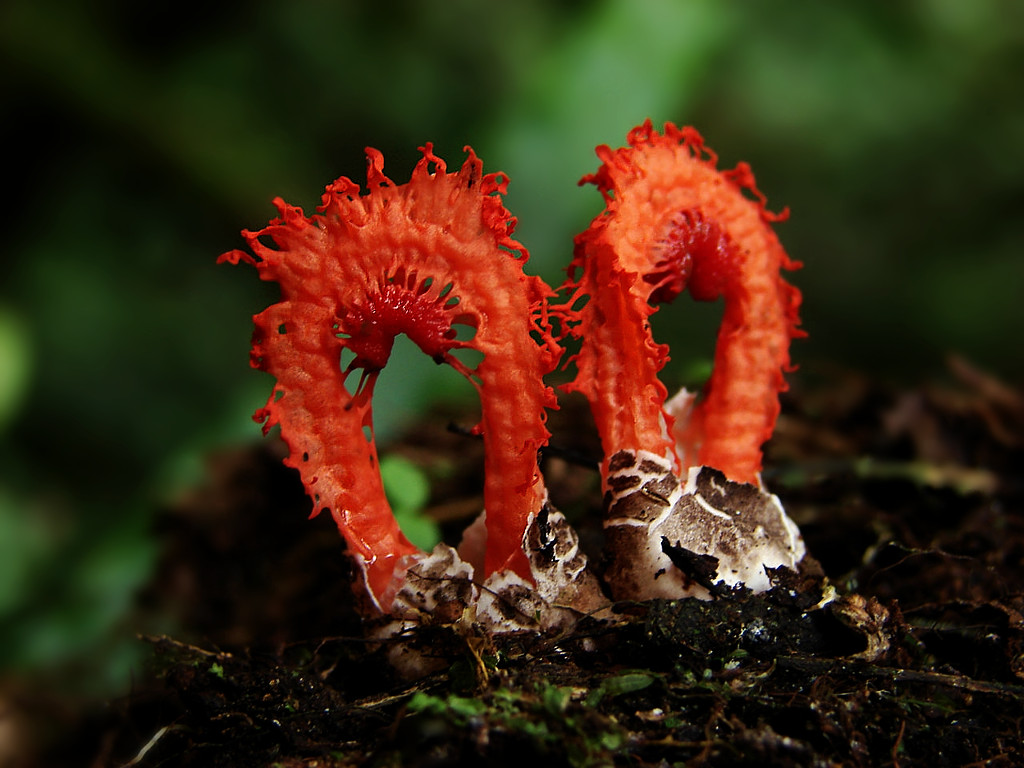
- Laternea pusilla in Costa Rica

Scientific classification
- Kingdom: Fungi
- Division: Basidiomycota
- Class: Agaricomycetes
- Order: Phallales
- Family: Phallaceae
- Genus: Laternea; Turpin (1822)

Type species
- Laternea triscapa Turpin (1820)

= Laternea =

Genus of fungi

Laternea is a genus of fungus in the family Phallaceae. The genus was first described by French botanist Pierre Jean François Turpin in 1822. It contains two species found in tropical regions of the Americas.

== Species ==
- Laternea brasiliensis
- Laternea columnata
- Laternea cristata
- Laternea dringii
- Laternea pusilla
- Laternea spegazzinii
- Laternea triscapa
