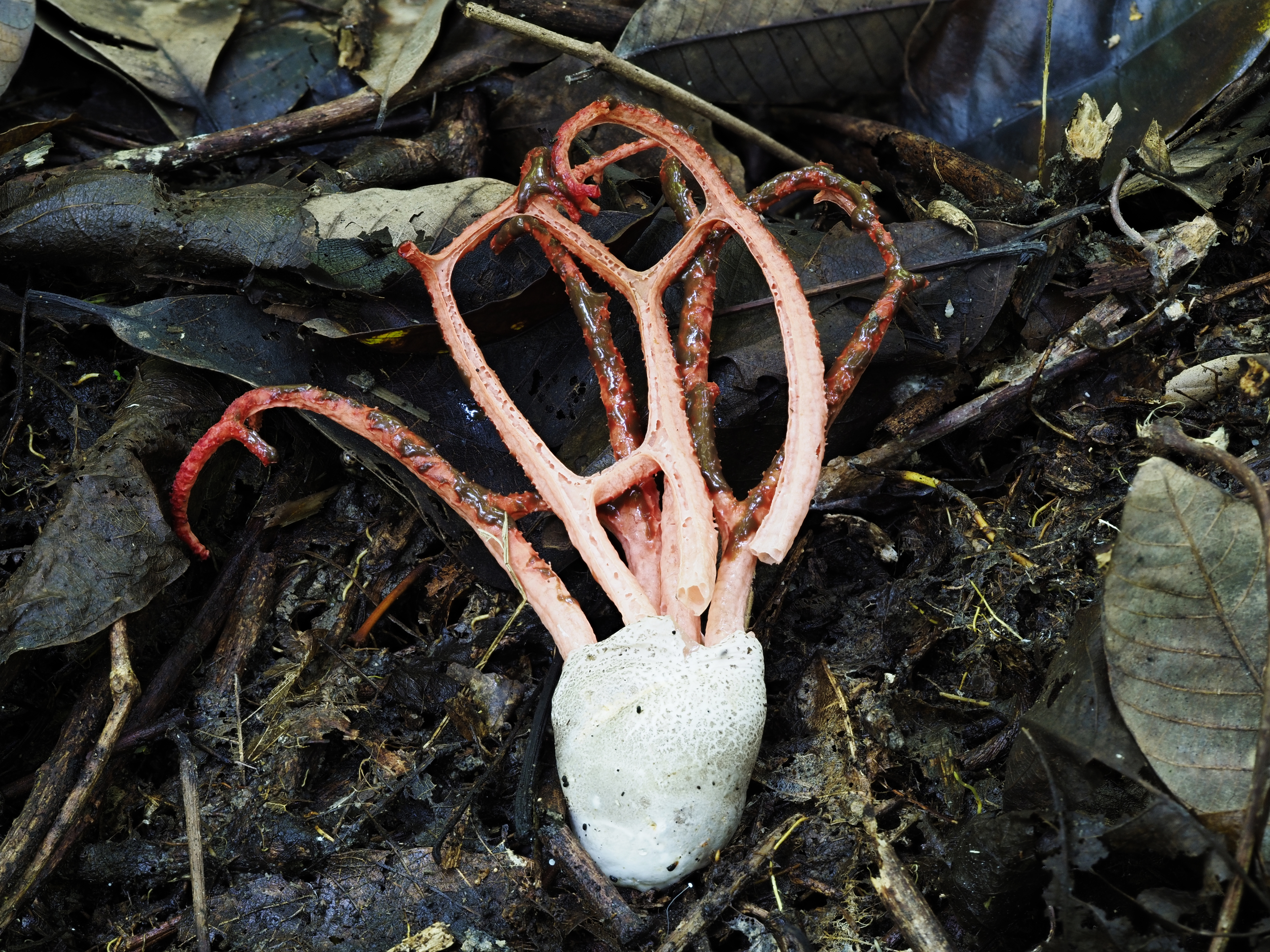
- Clathrus treubii found at Bukit Kiara, Kuala Lumpur, Malaysia

Scientific classification
- Domain: Eukaryota
- Kingdom: Fungi
- Division: Basidiomycota
- Class: Agaricomycetes
- Order: Phallales
- Family: Phallaceae
- Genus: Clathrus
- Species: C. treubii

Binomial name
- Clathrus treubii (Bernard) Lloyd

Synonyms
- 1906 Clathrella treubii G.E. Bernard; 1940 Colus treubii (G.E. Bernard) Reichert

= Clathrus treubii =

Species of fungus

Clathrus treubii Mycological characteristics
- Glebal hymenium
- No distinct cap
- Hymenium attachment is irregular or not applicable
- Lacks a stipe
- Spore print is olive-brown
- Ecology is saprotrophic

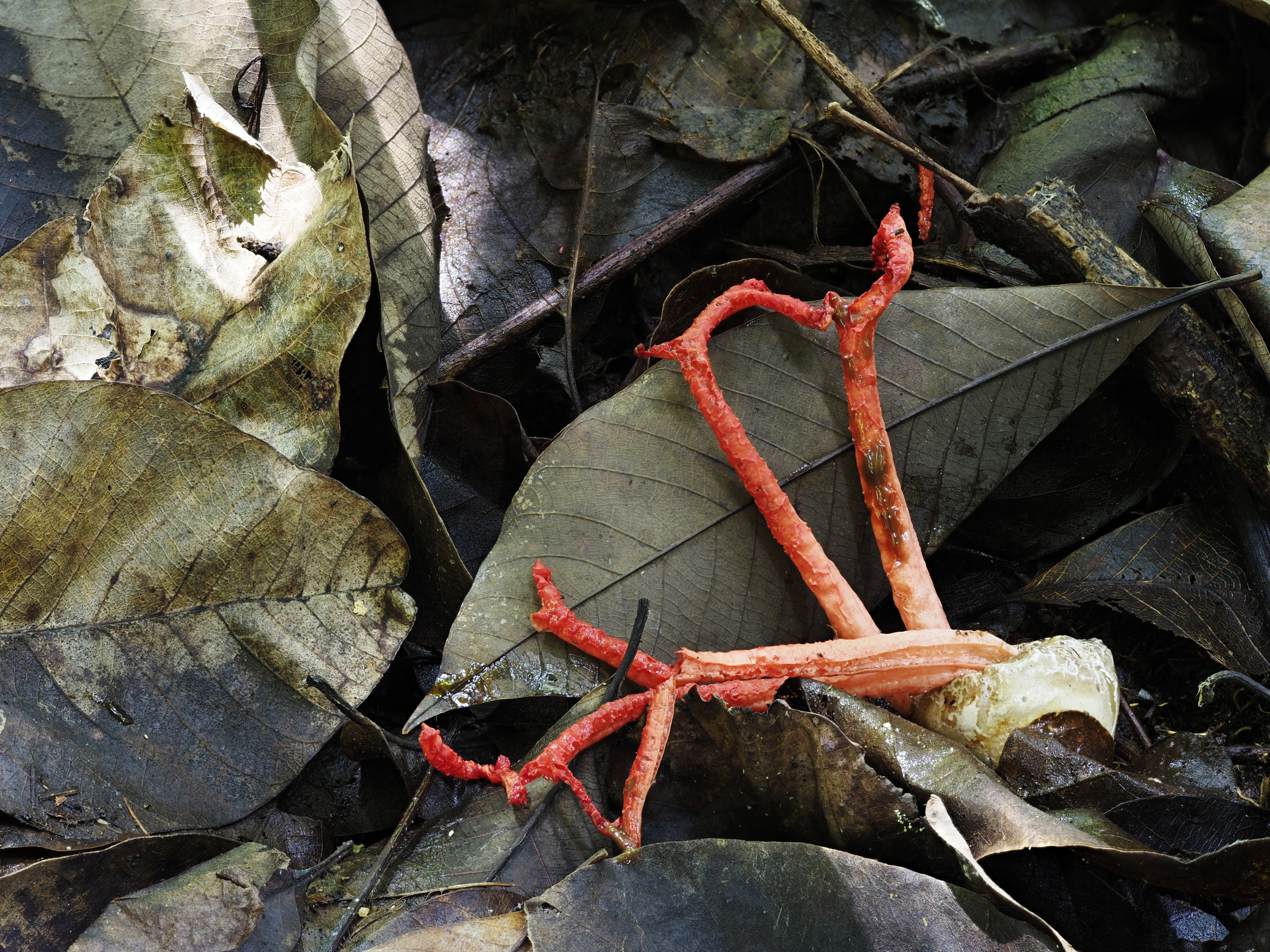
Clathrus treubii

Clathrus treubii is a species of fungus in the stinkhorn family. It is found in Indonesia and Malaysia.
