= Clathrus baumii =

Scientific classification
- Domain: Eukaryota
- Kingdom: Fungi
- Division: Basidiomycota
- Class: Agaricomycetes
- Order: Phallales
- Family: Phallaceae
- Genus: Clathrus
- Species: C. baumii

Binomial name
- Clathrus baumii Henn.

Synonyms
- 1933 Clathrella baumii (Henn.) E. Fisch.

Species of fungus

Clathrus baumii Mycological characteristics
- Glebal hymenium
- No distinct cap
- Hymenium attachment is irregular or not applicable
- Lacks a stipe
- Spore print is olive-brown
- Ecology is saprotrophic

Clathrus baumii is a species of fungus in the stinkhorn family. It was named by Paul Christoph Hennings in 1903, based on specimens found in Angola in 1899.
