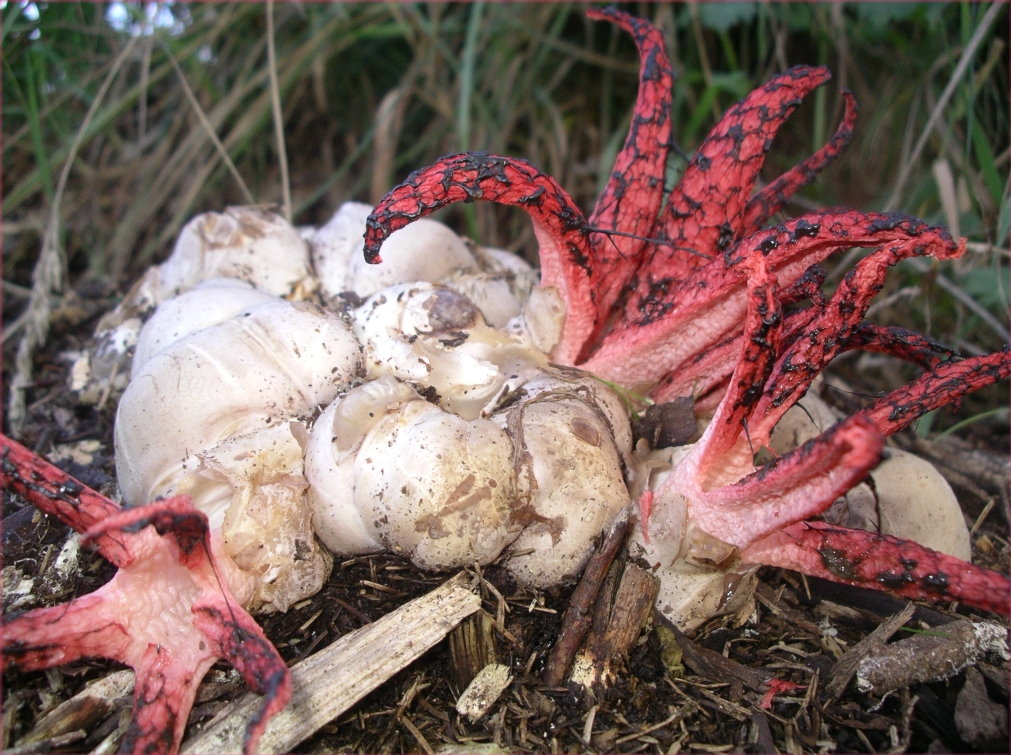
- Clathrus archeri

Scientific classification
- Kingdom: Fungi
- Division: Basidiomycota
- Class: Agaricomycetes
- Order: Phallales
- Family: Phallaceae
- Genus: Clathrus; P.Micheli ex L. (1753)

Type species
- Clathrus ruber P.Micheli ex Pers. (1801)

Synonyms
- Cletria P.Browne (1756); Anthurus Kalchbr. & MacOwan (1800); Colonnaria Raf. (1808); Dycticia Raf. (1808); Aserophallus Lepr. & Mont. (1845); Stephanophallus MacOwan (1880); Clathrella E.Fisch. (1898); Linderia G.Cunn. (1931); Linderiella G.Cunn. (1941)

= Clathrus =

Genus of fungi

Clathrus is a genus of fungi of the family Phallaceae, the stinkhorn fungi. Mature fruit bodies are covered with olive-brown slimy gleba, containing spores, that attract flies. These fungi are saprobic (feeding on dead organic matter) and are common in mulch.

== Species ==
- Clathrus archeri, octopus stinkhorn
- Clathrus baumii
- Clathrus bicolumnatus
- Clathrus cameroensis
- Clathrus cancellatum, cancer stinkhorn, striker
- Clathrus cheriar
- Clathrus chrysomycelinus
- Clathrus columnatus
- Clathrus crispus
- Clathrus crispatus
- Clathrus cristatus
- Clathrus delicatus
- Clathrus hainanensis
- Clathrus kusanoi
- Clathrus mauritianus
- Clathrus oahuensis
- Clathrus preussi
- Clathrus roseovolvatus
- Clathrus ruber (type species)
- Clathrus transvaalensis
- Clathrus treubii
- Clathrus xiningensis
