= Clathrus mauritianus =

Scientific classification
- Domain: Eukaryota
- Kingdom: Fungi
- Division: Basidiomycota
- Class: Agaricomycetes
- Order: Phallales
- Family: Phallaceae
- Genus: Clathrus
- Species: C. mauritianus

Binomial name
- Clathrus mauritianus (Lloyd) Dring

Synonyms
- 1910 Ithyphallus mauritianus (Lloyd) Sacc. & Traverso; 1917 Pseudocolus mauritianus Lloyd

Species of fungus

Clathrus mauritianus Mycological characteristics
- Glebal hymenium
- No distinct cap
- Hymenium attachment is irregular or not applicable
- Lacks a stipe
- Spore print is olive-brown
- Ecology is saprotrophic

Clathrus mauritianus is a species of fungus in the stinkhorn family. It is found in Mauritius.
