= Clathrus oahuensis =

Scientific classification
- Domain: Eukaryota
- Kingdom: Fungi
- Division: Basidiomycota
- Class: Agaricomycetes
- Order: Phallales
- Family: Phallaceae
- Genus: Clathrus
- Species: C. oahuensis

Binomial name
- Clathrus oahuensis Dring (1971)

Species of fungus

Clathrus oahuensis is a species of fungus in the stinkhorn family. Described as new to science in 1971, it is found in Hawaii.
