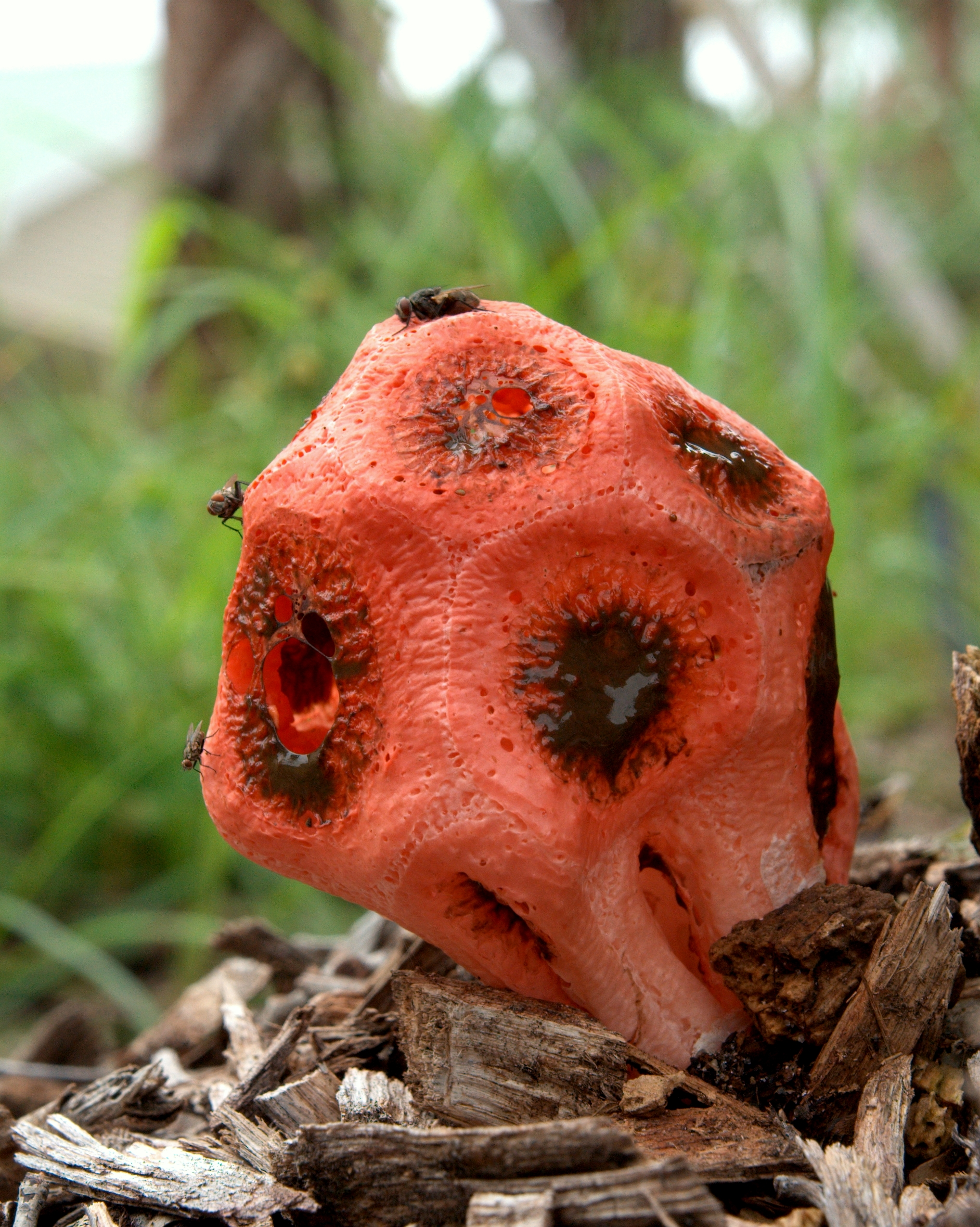

Scientific classification
- Domain: Eukaryota
- Kingdom: Fungi
- Division: Basidiomycota
- Class: Agaricomycetes
- Order: Phallales
- Family: Phallaceae
- Genus: Clathrus
- Species: C. crispus

Binomial name
- Clathrus crispus Turpin (1820)

Synonyms
- Clathrus crispus var. obovatus Berk. (1842); Clathrus americanus Lloyd (1909); Clathrus pseudocrispus Lloyd (1909); Clathrus crispus var. americanus (Lloyd) J.E.Wright (1949)

= Clathrus crispus =

Species of fungus

Clathrus crispus is a species of fungus in the stinkhorn family. Reported as new to science in 1820, it is found in the Americas.

== Taxonomy ==
The species was first described scientifically by French botanist Pierre Jean François Turpin in 1820, from specimens found in Haiti.

== Description ==
The volva is white, up to 7 centimetres (2.8 inches) in diameter, spherical to egg-shaped, and marked by a reticulum of grooves that are opened by irregular splitting at the apex. The fruit body is round to roughly elliptical, measuring up to 10 by 15 cm (3.9 by 5.9 in). It is scarlet-red on its upper parts, but lighter near the base where it is hidden by the volva. There are up to about 50 radially grooved holes in the fruit body, which are more or less polyhedral to spherical near the top, but more elongated near the base. The spongy arms are up to about 1 cm (0.4 in) wide, and unite at the base to form a structure with the overall shape of an inverted cone. The gleba is olive to greenish and slimy, and coats the inner rims of the lattice holes. Spores are elliptical to cylindrical, slightly greenish in color, and have dimensions of 3.8–4.2 by 1.8–2.2 μm (up to 0.000165 by 8.7×10^{−5} in).

== Habitat and distribution ==
Clathrus crispus is saprobic, and its fruit bodies grow on the ground singly or in groups. It is found in gardens, lawns and cultivated soils, especially when wood chips have been used as mulch. A specimen matching the description of C. crispus was recorded from Puerto Rico in 2005. The species has been recorded from USA (Florida), Mexico, West Indies (Cuba, Hispaniola, Jamaica, Puerto Rico), Central and South America to Uruguay and northern Argentina (Cordoba).

The species was featured in a Grenadan postage stamp in 1986.
