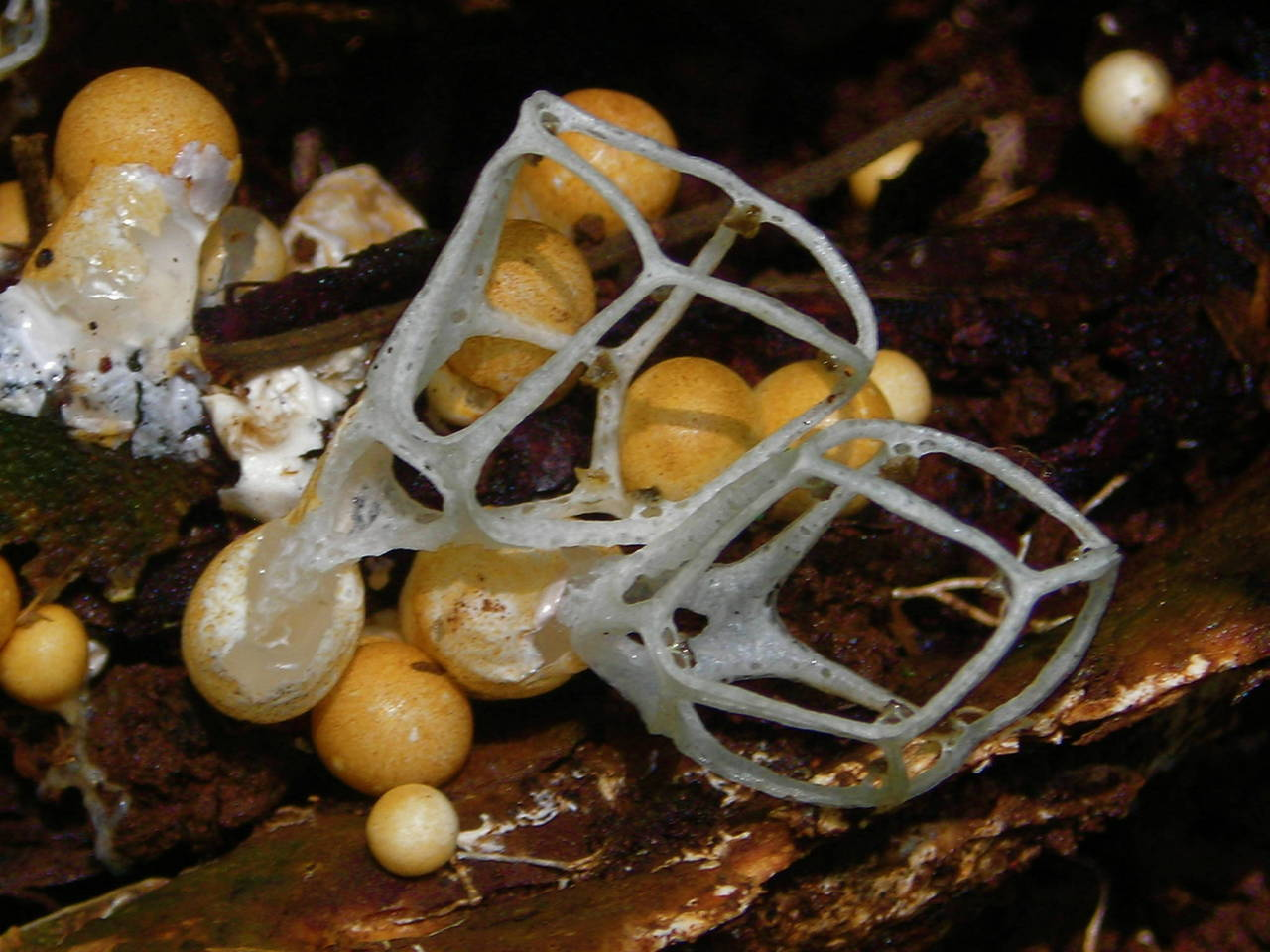

Scientific classification
- Kingdom: Fungi
- Division: Basidiomycota
- Class: Agaricomycetes
- Order: Phallales
- Family: Phallaceae
- Genus: Clathrus
- Species: C. delicatus

Binomial name
- Clathrus delicatus Berk. & Broome (1873)

Synonyms
- Clathrella delicata (Berk. & Broome) E.Fisch. (1886)

= Clathrus delicatus =

Species of fungus

Clathrus delicatus
- Mycological characteristics
- Glebal hymenium
- No distinct cap
- Hymenium attachment is irregular or not applicable
- Lacks a stipe
- Spore print is olive-brown
- Ecology is saprotrophic
- Edibility is unknown

Clathrus delicatus or Delicate Lace Stinkhorn is a species of fungus in the stinkhorn family. It originates from Sri Lanka and India.
