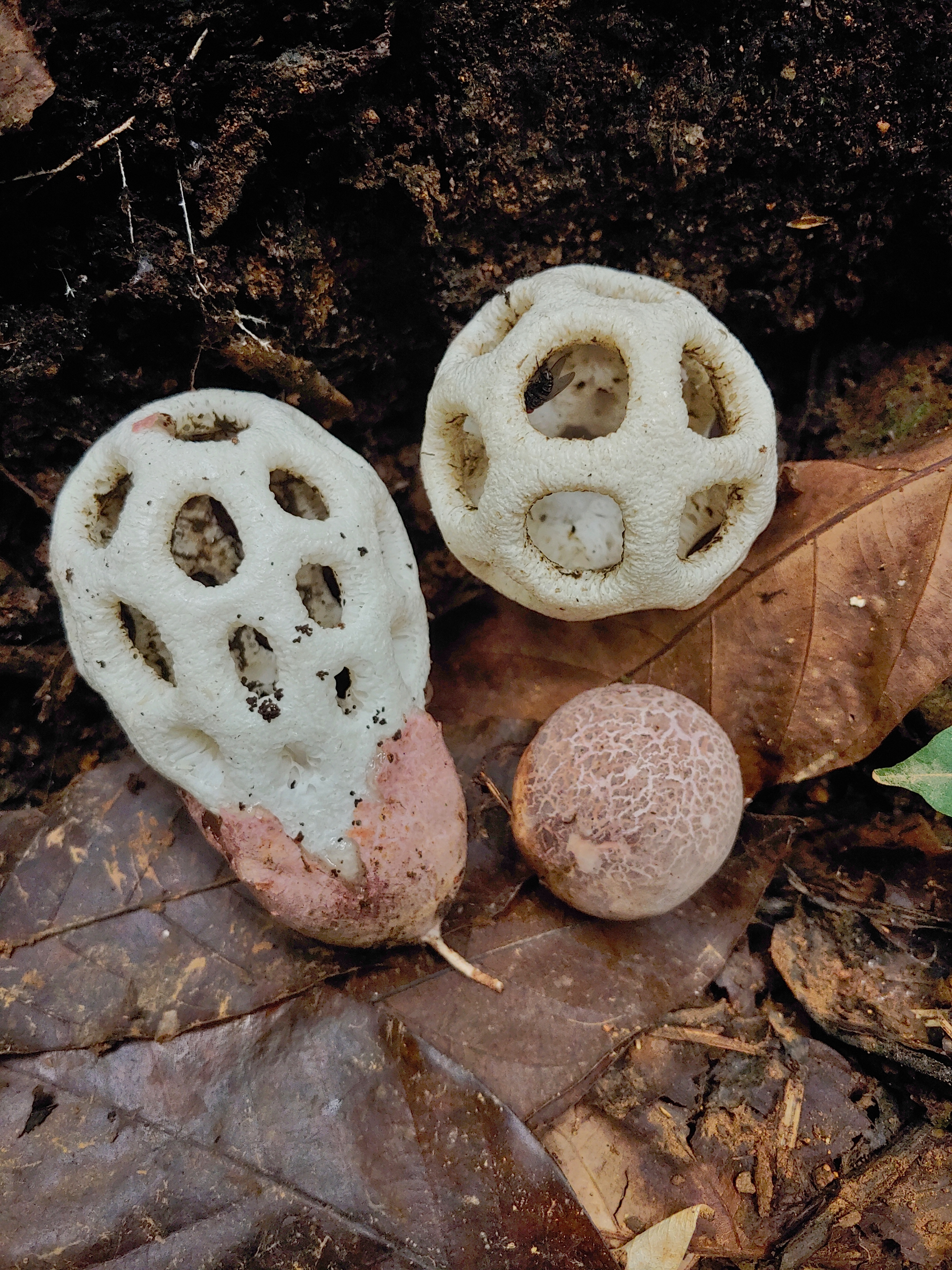

Scientific classification
- Kingdom: Fungi
- Division: Basidiomycota
- Class: Agaricomycetes
- Order: Phallales
- Family: Phallaceae
- Genus: Clathrus
- Species: C. roseovolvatus

Binomial name
- Clathrus roseovolvatus Lécuru, Mornand, Fiard & Courtec. (2013)

= Clathrus roseovolvatus =

Species of fungus

Clathrus roseovolvatus is a species of fungus in the stinkhorn family. Described as new to science in 2013, it is found in the South America and the Caribbean.
