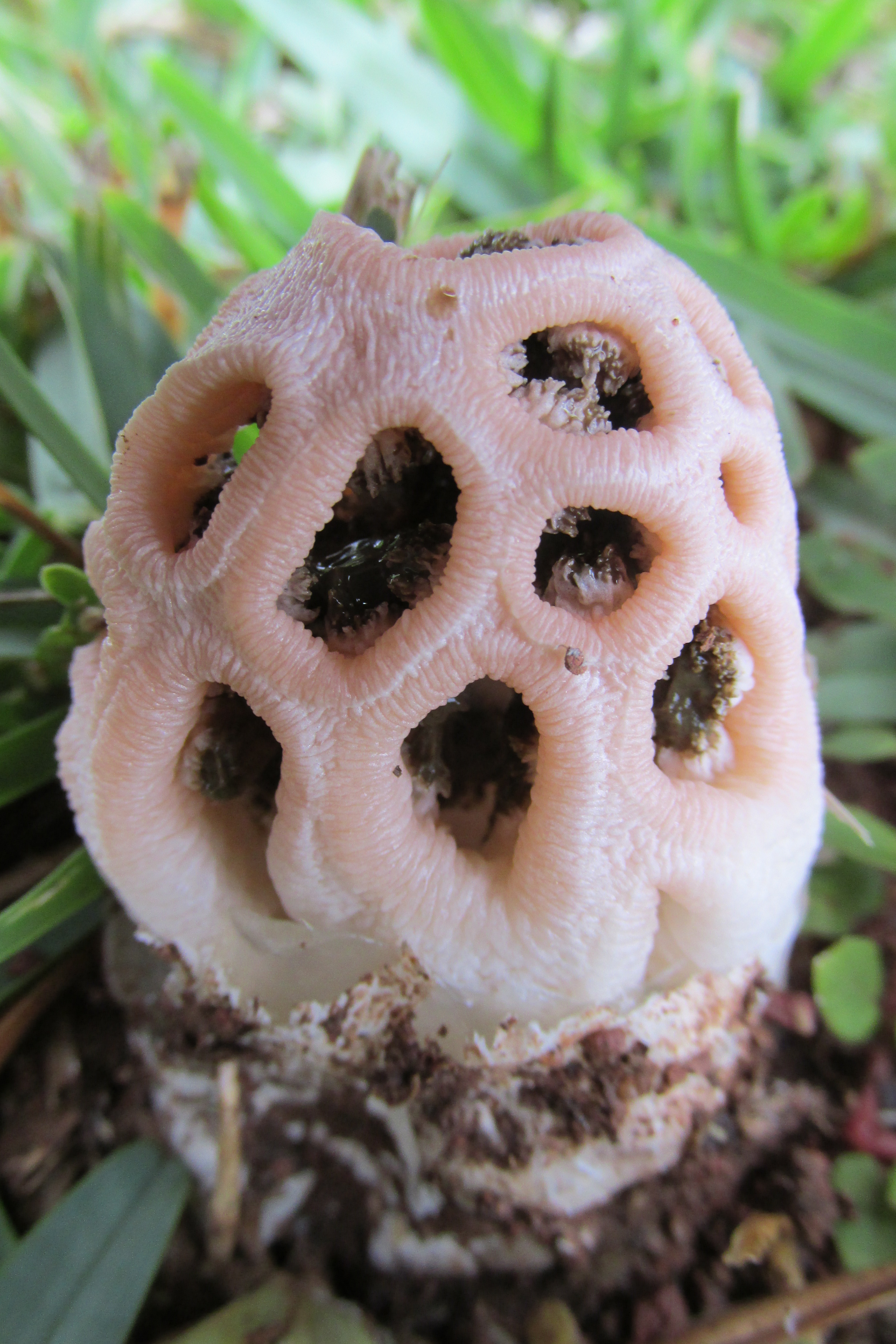

Scientific classification
- Domain: Eukaryota
- Kingdom: Fungi
- Division: Basidiomycota
- Class: Agaricomycetes
- Order: Phallales
- Family: Phallaceae
- Genus: Clathrus
- Species: C. transvaalensis

Binomial name
- Clathrus transvaalensis Eicker & D.A.Reid (1990)

= Clathrus transvaalensis =

Species of fungus

Clathrus transvaalensis is a species of fungus in the stinkhorn family. It is found in South Africa. It was described as new to science in 1990 by mycologists Albert Eicker and Derek Reid. The fruit body forms a hollow, pale yellow to pinkish lattice structure.

== Discovery ==
Immature Clathrus transvaalensis fruitbodies (phalloid "eggs") were discovered following heavy rains in the Transvaal, South Africa, on the grounds of a country club in Pretoria. Because the eggs, laying in grass, were in danger of being trampled by golfers, they were transferred to a laboratory where they were incubated and covered with moist paper towel to prevent desiccation. Several receptacles (the lattice-like fruit bodies of a phalloid fungus) developed to maturity. The fungus was described as a new species by mycologists Albert Eicker and Derek Reid, with the results published in 1990. The type specimen, collected on 16 February 1989, is held at the herbarium of the Royal Botanic Gardens, Kew.

== Description ==
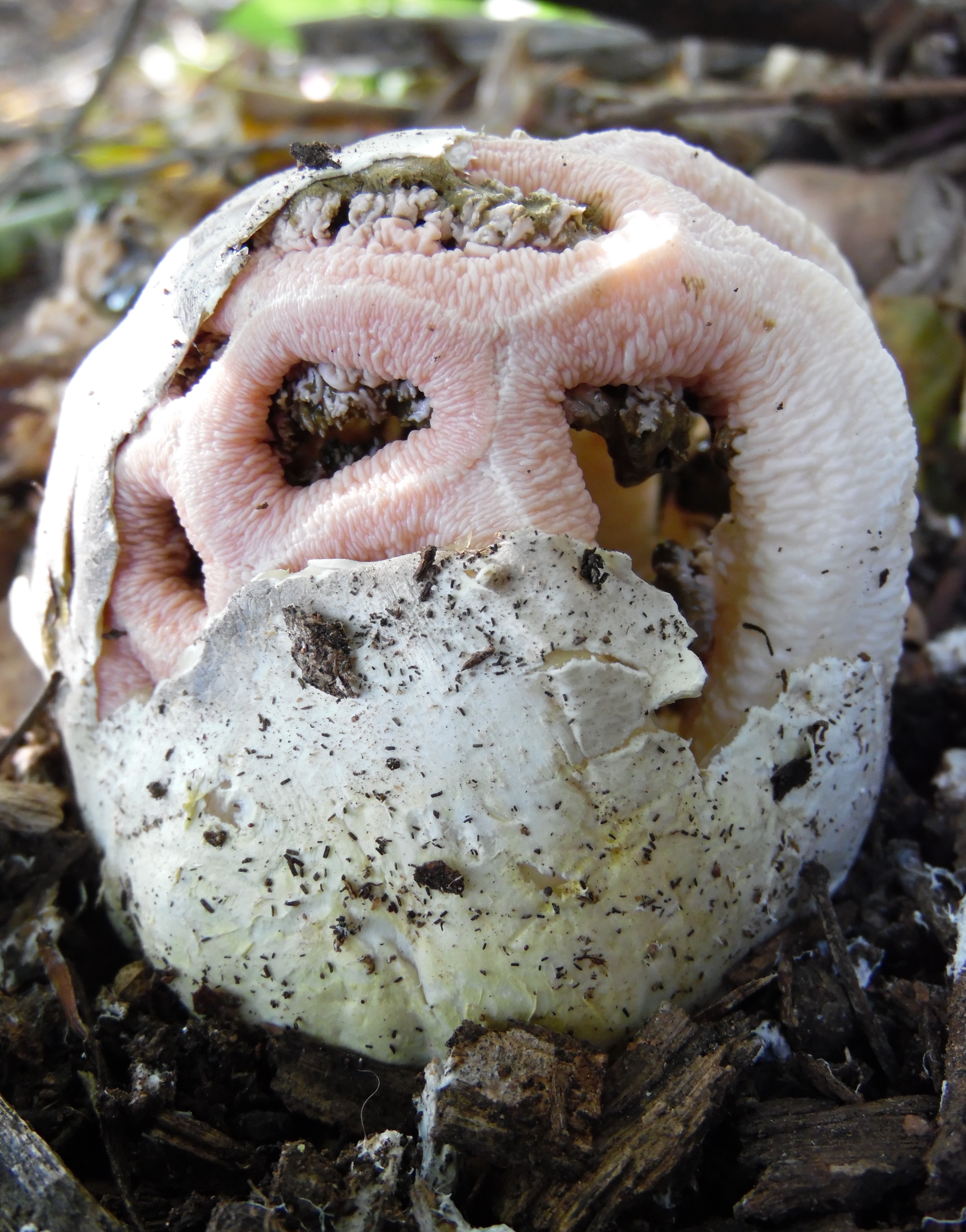
Receptacle emerging from the egg

Fruitbodies of Clathrus transvaalensis originate from a smooth, whitish, egg-shaped structure measuring up to 4.5 cm (1.8 in) in diameter. The egg is attached to the ground by one or more thick mycelial strands. As the receptacle emerges, it causes an irregular tearing of the tissue at the top of the egg, and the peridium ultimately forms a loose volva at the base of the receptacle.

The broadly egg-shaped receptacles reach a size of 8 cm (3.1 in) tall by 5 cm (2.0 in) wide. The lattice structure of the receptacle typically contains about 21 meshes. One mesh is situated at the top, encircled by 5 meshes, followed by a circle of 7 meshes and then 8 vertically elongated meshes in the lower half. The tubular "arms" of the receptacles are pale yellow near the base, gradually changing to pinkish in the upper third. They are 3.5–11 mm (0.14–0.43 in) wide, with a rounded triangular shape when viewed in cross-section. The outer surface of the arms is flat with rounded edges, and features transverse wrinkles; the inner surface is even more strongly wrinkled.

The context, or tissue, of the arms comprises roughly 11 regularly arranged, non-interconnecting tubes. Gleba is secreted by glebiferous organs that are mostly located at intersection of the arms. These organs resemble a cushion-like swelling that is itself meshed. The gleba is slimy, and coloured dark olive-green to brown. Its odour has been described as slightly foetid, or resembling granadilla and pineapple. Spores are more or less cylindrical, measuring 4–4.5 by 1.5 μm.

== Habitat and distribution ==
Clathrus transvaalensis is a saprophytic fungus that fruits in clumps on the ground in grass. It is one of six Clathrus species known to occur in South Africa.
