= Clathrus cristatus =

Scientific classification
- Domain: Eukaryota
- Kingdom: Fungi
- Division: Basidiomycota
- Class: Agaricomycetes
- Order: Phallales
- Family: Phallaceae
- Genus: Clathrus
- Species: C. cristatus

Binomial name
- Clathrus cristatus Fazolino, Calonge & Baseia

Species of fungus

Clathrus cristatus Mycological characteristics
- Glebal hymenium
- No distinct cap
- Hymenium attachment is irregular or not applicable
- Lacks a stipe
- Spore print is olive-brown
- Ecology is saprotrophic

Clathrus cristatus is a species of fungus in the stinkhorn family. Found in Brazil, it was described as new to science in 2010.
