= Clathrus xiningensis =

Scientific classification
- Domain: Eukaryota
- Kingdom: Fungi
- Division: Basidiomycota
- Class: Agaricomycetes
- Order: Phallales
- Family: Phallaceae
- Genus: Clathrus
- Species: C. xiningensis

Binomial name
- Clathrus xiningensis (H.A.Wen) B.Liu (1994)

Synonyms
- Linderiella xiningensis H.A.Wen (1998)

Species of fungus

Clathrus xiningensis is a species of fungus in the stinkhorn family. Found in China, it was described as new to science in 1994.
