= Clathrus crispatus =

Scientific classification
- Domain: Eukaryota
- Kingdom: Fungi
- Division: Basidiomycota
- Class: Agaricomycetes
- Order: Phallales
- Family: Phallaceae
- Genus: Clathrus
- Species: C. crispatus

Binomial name
- Clathrus crispatus Thwaites ex E. Fisch.

Species of fungus

Clathrus crispatus Mycological characteristics
- Glebal hymenium
- No distinct cap
- Hymenium attachment is irregular or not applicable
- Lacks a stipe
- Spore print is olive-brown
- Ecology is saprotrophic

Clathrus crispatus is a species of fungus in the stinkhorn family. It is found in Asia.
