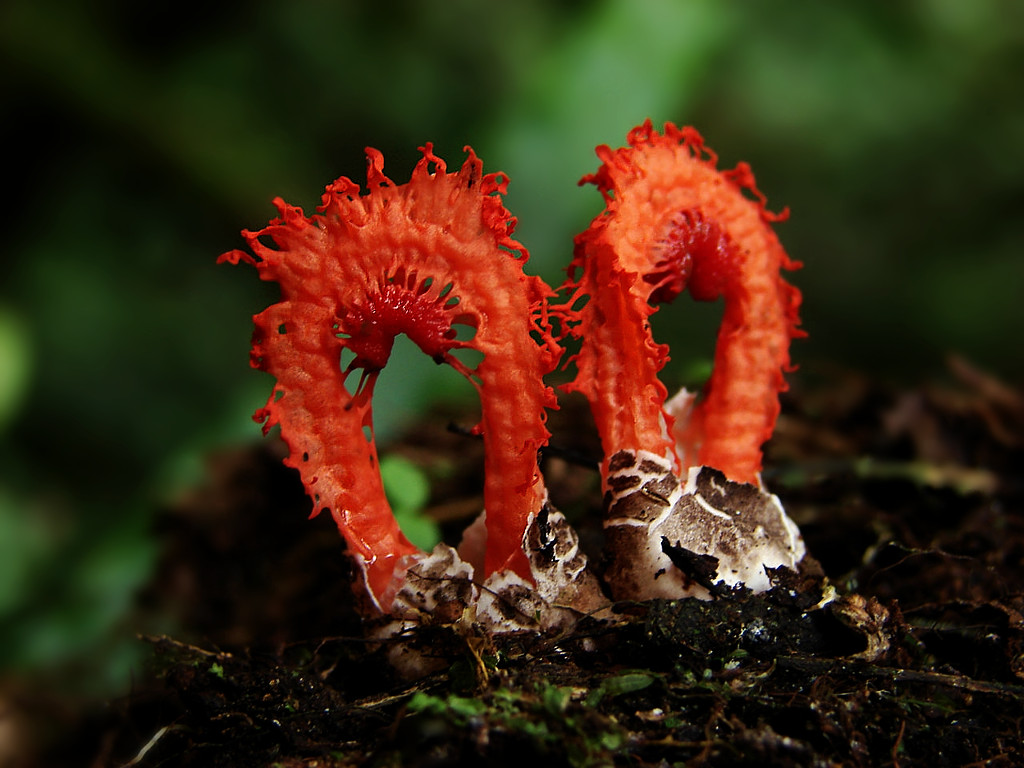
- Laternea pusilla in Costa Rica

Scientific classification
- Kingdom: Fungi
- Division: Basidiomycota
- Class: Agaricomycetes
- Order: Phallales
- Family: Phallaceae
- Genus: Laternea
- Species: L. pusilla

Binomial name
- Laternea pusilla Berk. & M.A.Curtis (1868)

= Laternea pusilla =

Species of fungus

Laternea pusilla or Crimson Flame Stinkhorn is a species of fungus in the family Phallaceae.
