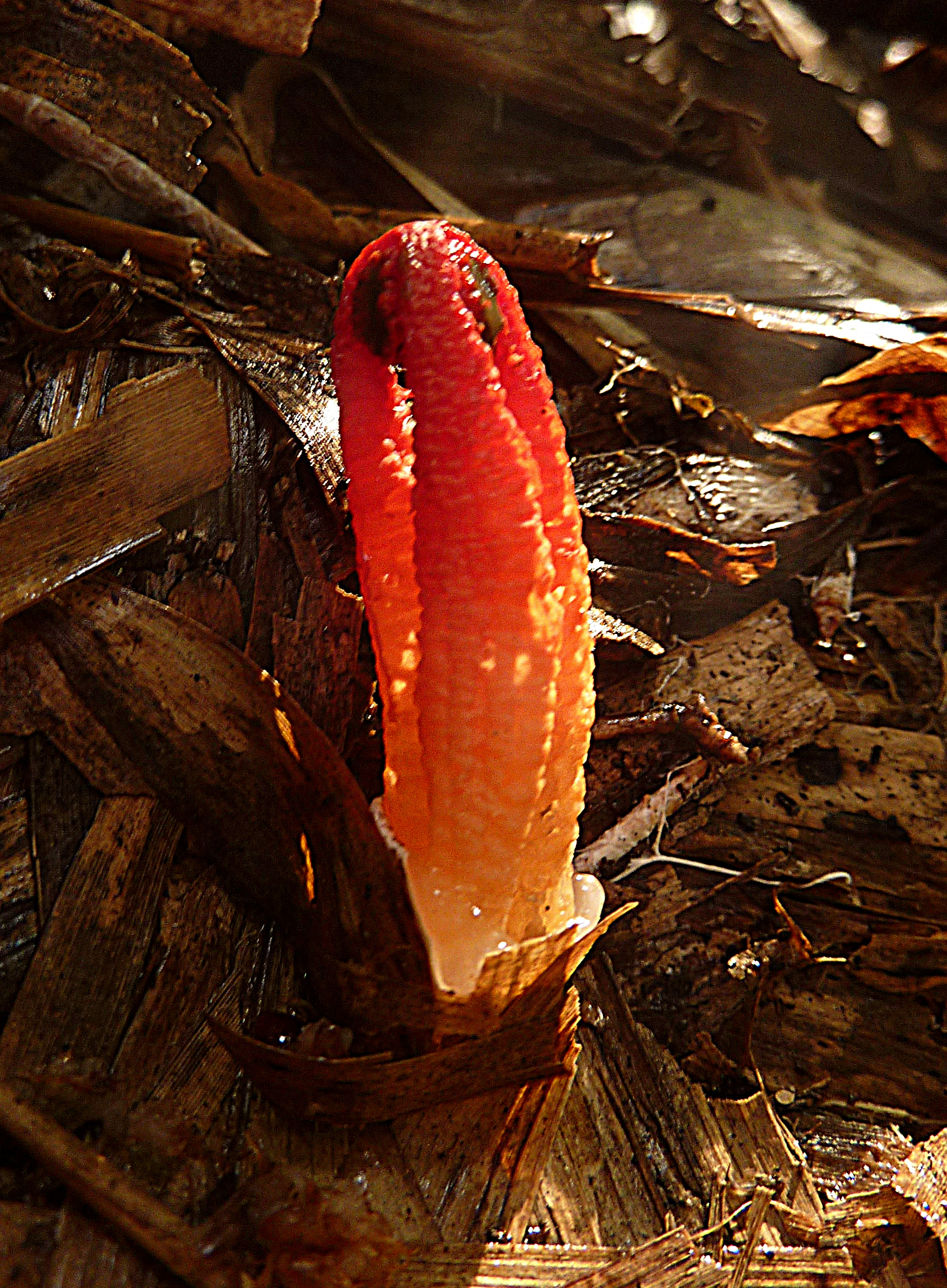
- in Panama

Scientific classification
- Kingdom: Fungi
- Division: Basidiomycota
- Class: Agaricomycetes
- Order: Phallales
- Family: Phallaceae
- Genus: Laternea
- Species: L. triscapa

Binomial name
- Laternea triscapa Turpin (1820)

Synonyms
- Colonnaria triscapa (Turpin) R.Sant. (1943); Clathrus triscapus (Turpin) Fr. (1823)

= Laternea triscapa =

Species of fungus

Laternea triscapa is a species of fungus in the family Phallaceae. The species was first described by French botanist Pierre Jean François Turpin in 1820. It is found in Central and South America, and the West Indies.

== Gallery ==
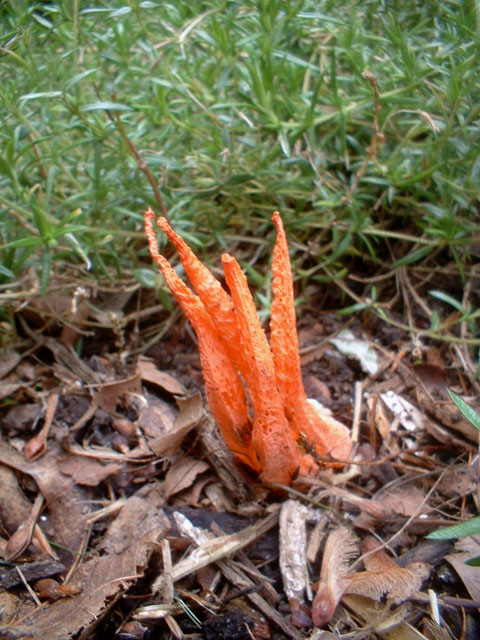
Individual fruiting body growing on pine bark mulch of unknown origin.

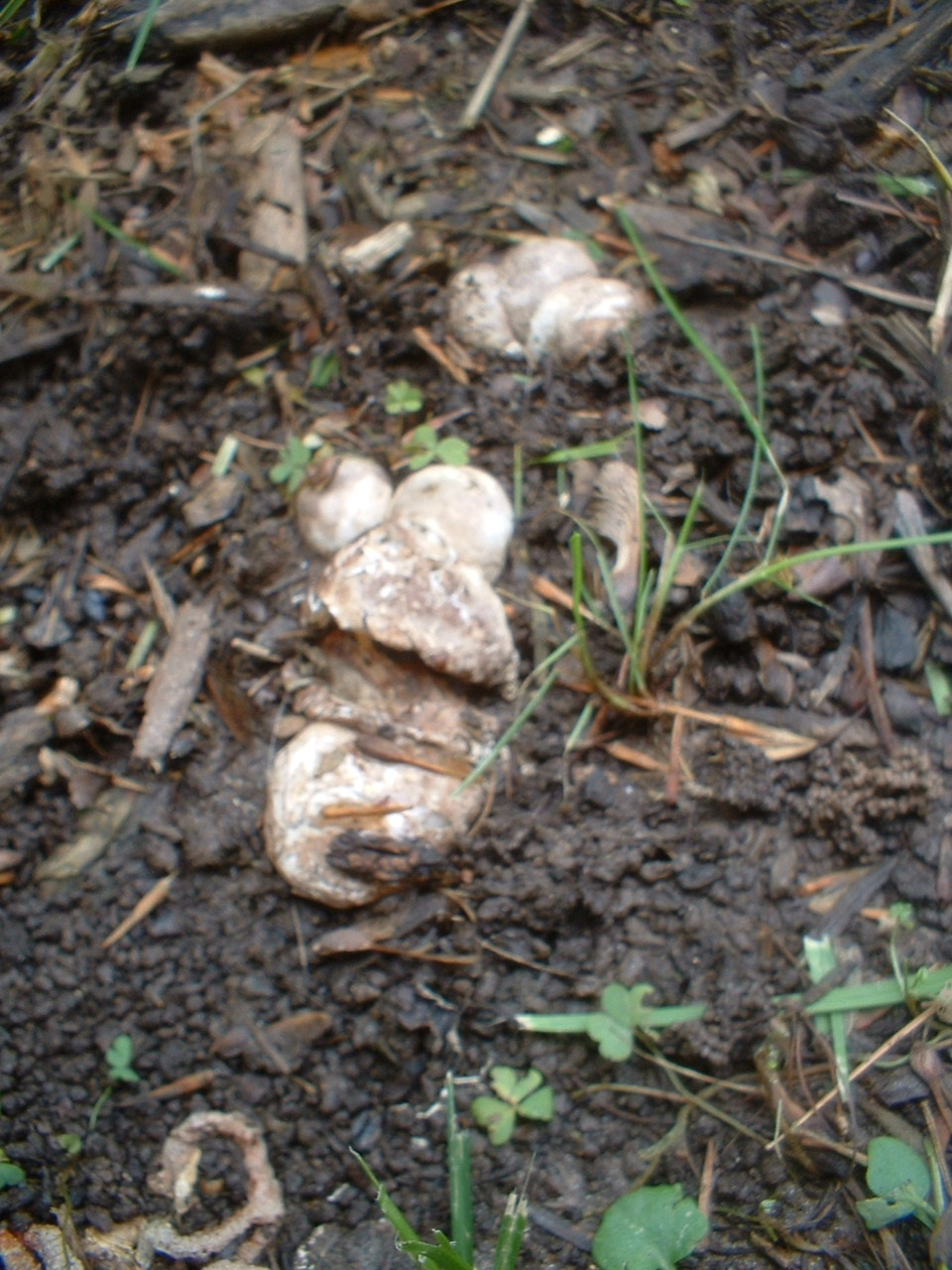
Several puffballs on pine bark mulch.

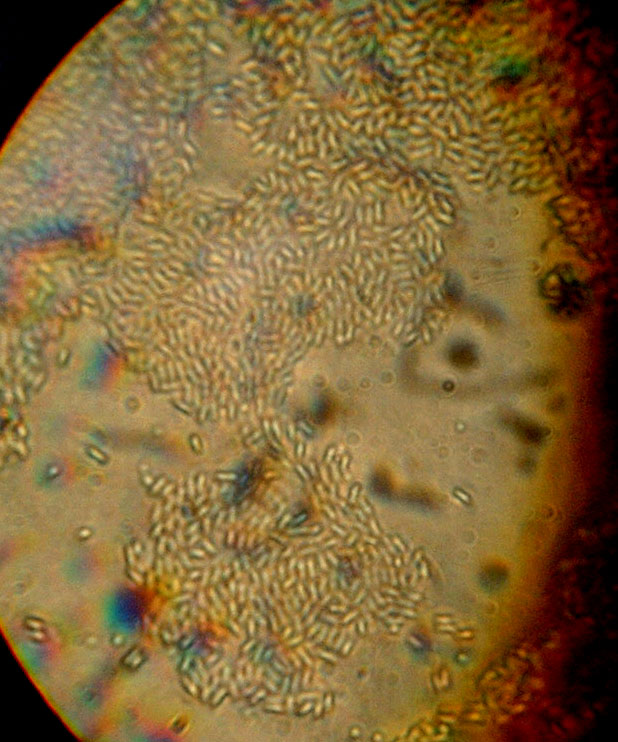
Spores of Laternea triscapa magnified 1000x in Nikon microscope.
