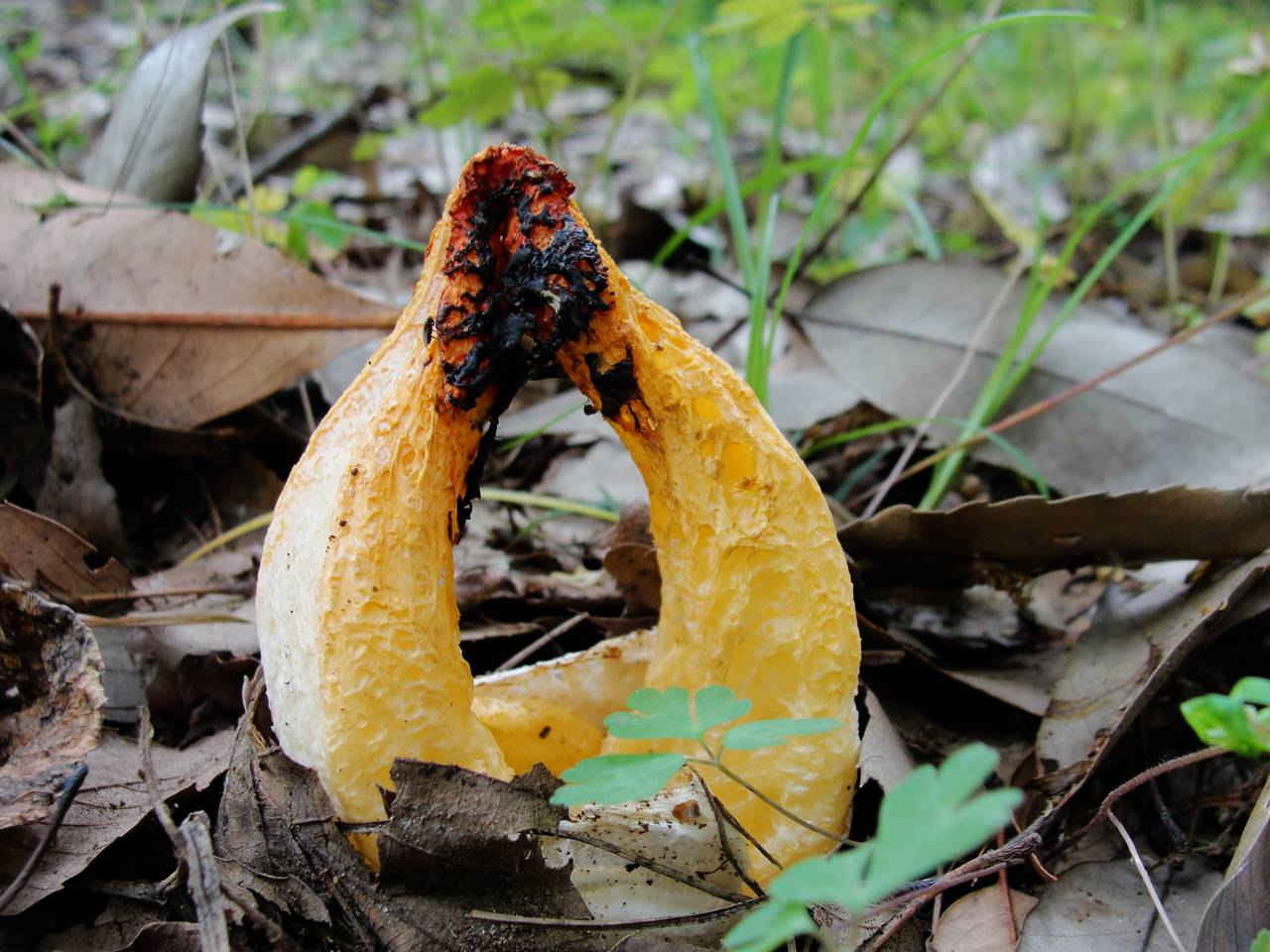

Scientific classification
- Kingdom: Fungi
- Division: Basidiomycota
- Class: Agaricomycetes
- Order: Phallales
- Family: Phallaceae
- Genus: Clathrus
- Species: C. bicolumnatus

Binomial name
- Clathrus bicolumnatus (Lloyd) Sacc. & Trotter

Synonyms
- 1931 Linderia bicolumnata (Lloyd) G. Cunn. 1942 Linderiella bicolumnata (Lloyd) G. Cunn. 1942; 1961 Laternea columnata var. bicolumnata (Lloyd) Rick

= Clathrus bicolumnatus =

Species of fungus

Clathrus bicolumnatus
- Mycological characteristics
- Glebal hymenium
- No distinct cap
- Hymenium attachment is irregular or not applicable
- Lacks a stipe
- Spore print is olive-brown
- Ecology is saprotrophic
- Edibility is unknown

Clathrus bicolumnatus or arched stinkhorn is a species of fungus in the stinkhorn family. It is known only from Japan.

Species has been reclassified as Laternea columnata.
