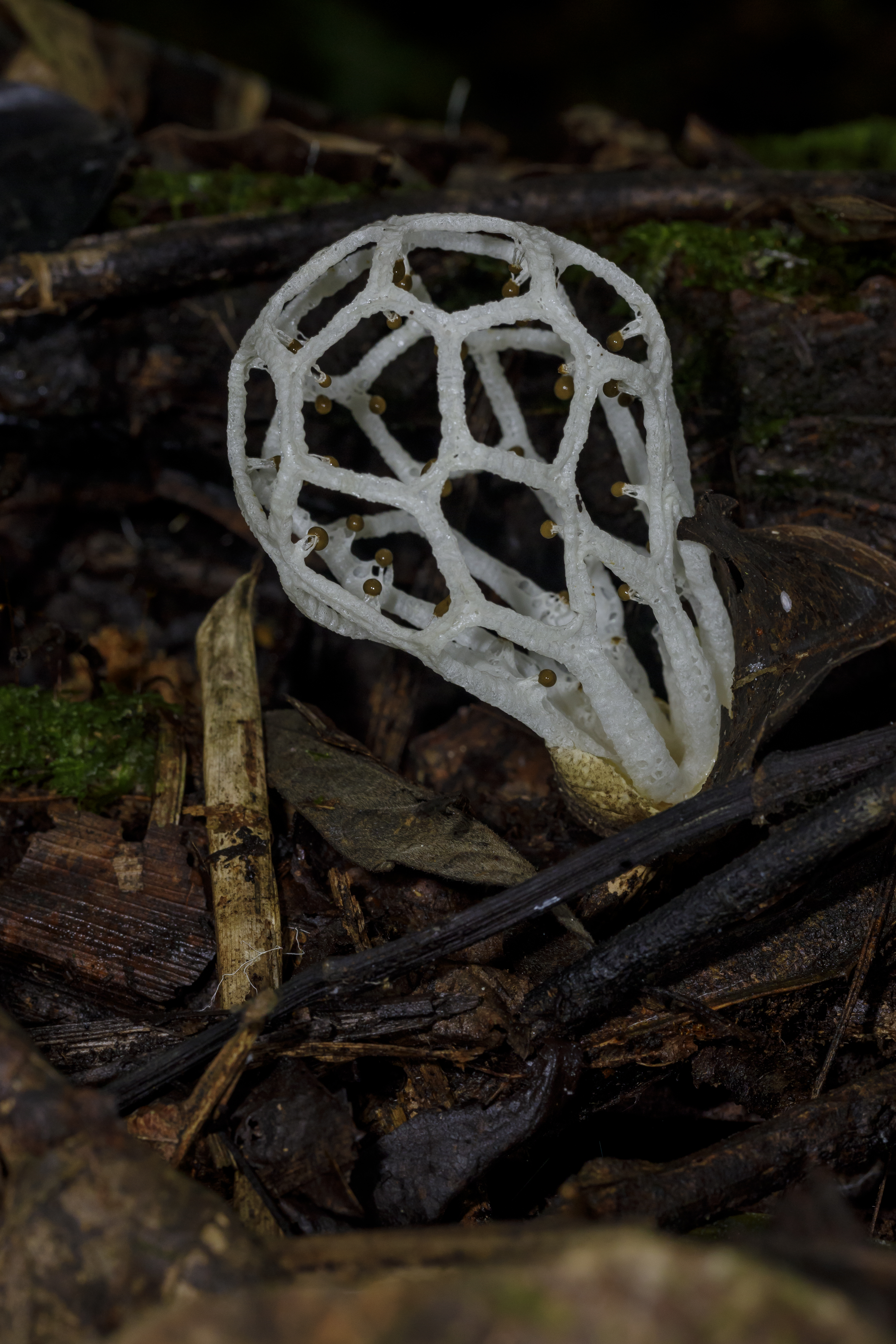
- Clathrus chrysomycelinus in Brazil

Scientific classification
- Kingdom: Fungi
- Division: Basidiomycota
- Class: Agaricomycetes
- Order: Phallales
- Family: Phallaceae
- Genus: Clathrus
- Species: C. chrysomycelinus

Binomial name
- Clathrus chrysomycelinus Møller

Synonyms
- 1898 Clathrella chrysomycelina (Möller) E. Fisch.

= Clathrus chrysomycelinus =

Species of fungus

Clathrus chrysomycelinus
- Mycological characteristics
- Glebal hymenium
- No distinct cap
- Hymenium attachment is irregular or not applicable
- Lacks a stipe
- Spore print is olive-brown
- Ecology is saprotrophic

Clathrus chrysomycelinus is a species of fungus in the stinkhorn family. It is found in South America and reported from New Zealand, although the equivalence of the species is yet to be determined. The fungus grows up to 60 mm across by 100 mm tall.
