= Pierre Jean François Turpin =

French botanist and illustrator

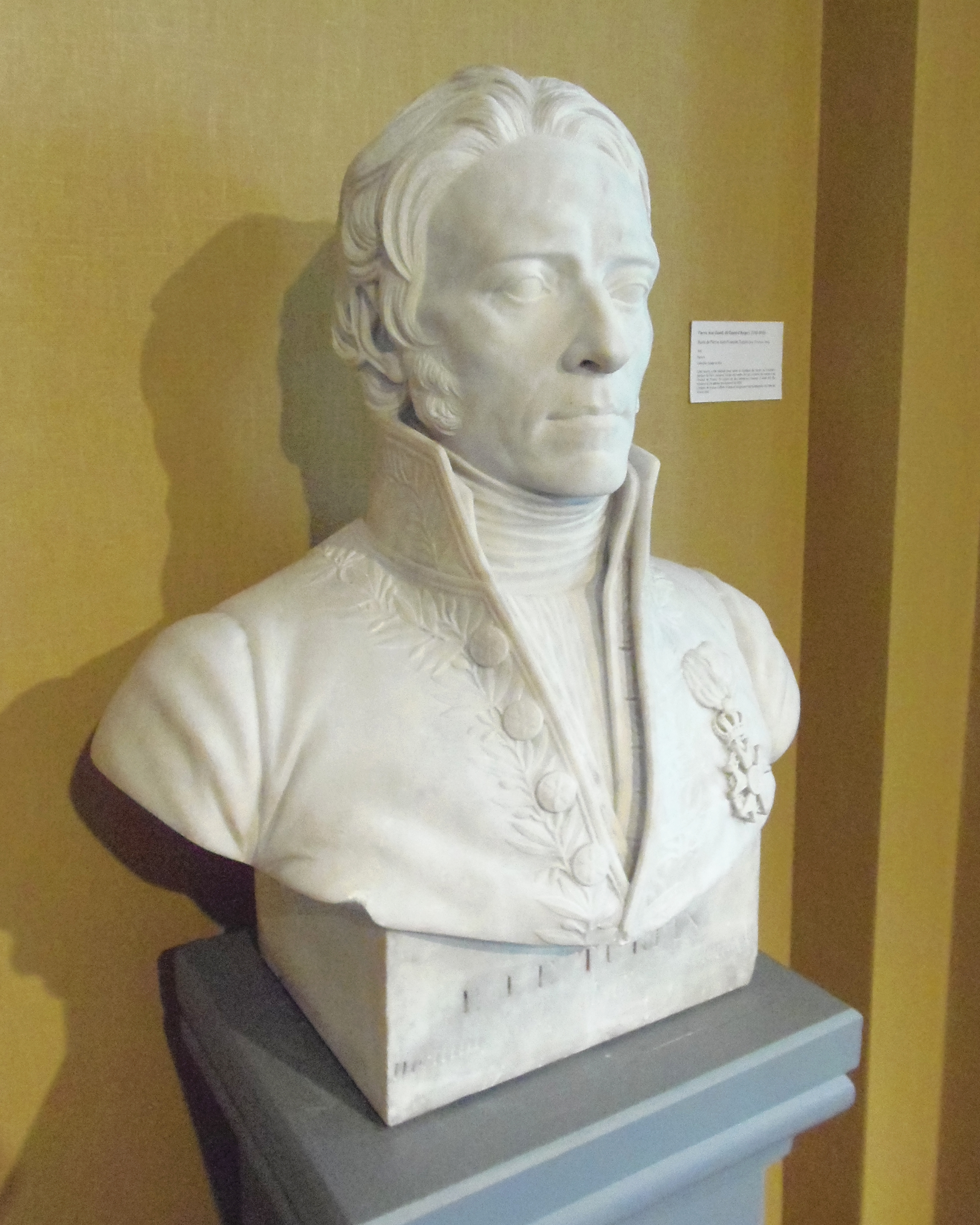
Pierre Jean François Turpin, bust by David d'Angers

Pierre Jean François Turpin (11 March 1775, Vire – 1 May 1840) was a French botanist and illustrator. He was considered as one of the greatest floral and botanical illustrators during the Napoleonic Era and afterwards. As an artist, Turpin was largely self-taught.

In 1794 he was stationed in Haiti as a member of the French Army. Here, he met botanist Pierre Antoine Poiteau (1766-1854), through whom Turpin learned botany, and in the meantime, created numerous botanical field drawings that were to become a basis of further study when the two men returned to France. In regard to their work in Haiti, they were able to describe approximately 800 species of plants. Turpin would have a working relationship with Poiteau throughout his career.

Through his collaboration with Poiteau and other naturalists, Turpin created some of the finest watercolors and illustrations of plants that are known to exist. The following are some of the works making use of Turpin's illustrations:

- Augustin Saint-Hilaire's Flora Brasiliae Meridionalis in three volumes (1825–1832)
- Jules Paul Benjamin Delessert's (1773-1847) Icones selectae plantarum.
- With Pierre Poiteau, he produced an updated version of Henri Louis Duhamel du Monceau's (1700-1782) Traité des arbres fruitiers (treatise on fruit trees).
- Alexander von Humboldt (1769-1859) and Aimé Bonpland's (1773-1858) Plantes Equinoxales (1808).
- Jean Louis Marie Poiret's (1755-1834) Leçons de flore: Cours complet de botanique (1819-1820).
- François-Pierre Chaumeton's (1775-1819) Flore médicale (1828-1832).

In 1833 he was elected as a member to the Académie des sciences. The plant genus Turpinia is named in his honour.

== Works ==
- Essai d'une iconographie élémentaire et philosophique des végétaux (in French). Paris: Charles Louis Fleury Panckoucke. 1820.
- Essai d'une iconographie élémentaire et philosophique des végétaux (in French). Paris: Charles Louis Fleury Panckoucke. 1820.
