= Eduard Fischer (mycologist) =

Swiss botanist and mycologist (1861–1939)

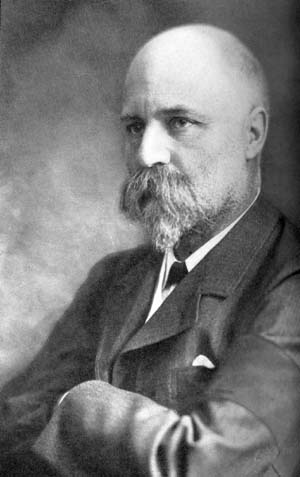
- Born: 16 June 1861; Bern
- Died: 18 November 1939 (aged 78); Bern
- Citizenship: Swiss
- Spouse: Johanna Gruner (m. 1899)
- Children: Kurt von Fischer
- Scientific career
- Fields: Botany, mycology, plant pathology
- Institutions: University of Bern
- Doctoral advisor: Heinrich Anton de Bary
- Doctoral students: Lydia Rabinowitsch, Ernst Albert Gäumann
- Author abbrev. (botany): E.Fisch.

Eduard Fischer (16 June 1861 – 18 November 1939) was a Swiss botanist and mycologist.

== Life ==
Fischer was the son of botanist Ludwig Fischer, a professor and director of the state botanic garden. Fischer studied at the University of Bern and graduated in 1883 with mushroom researcher Heinrich Anton de Bary in Strasbourg, with whom he studied Gasteromycetes. During further studies in Berlin during 1884–1885, he worked with Simon Schwendener (1829–1919), August Wilhelm Eichler (1839–1887) and Paul Friedrich August Ascherson (1834–1913). In 1885 Fischer was appointed as a lecturer at the University of Bern; 1893, he was promoted to associate professor. From 1897 to 1933 he was professor of botany and general biology at the university, and succeeded his father as director of the Botanic Garden and Botanical Institute in Bern.

In 1899, Fischer married Johanna Gruner, who came from a scholarly family. He died in Bern on 18 November 1939, aged 78. He was the father of the pianist Kurt von Fischer.

== Work ==
Fischer produced major monographs for central Europe of various ascomycete and basidiomycete groups, including rusts. Fischer encouraged the plant pathologist Arthur Jaczewski to study mycology. His graduate students included the Lithuanian-born American physician Lydia Rabinowitsch, and the mycologist Ernst Albert Gäumann. Fischer became a member of the Linnean Society of London in 1932.

== Honors ==
- 1931: Honorary doctorate of the University of Geneva
- 1939: Honorary doctorate from the Medical Faculty of the University of Basel

== Taxa described ==
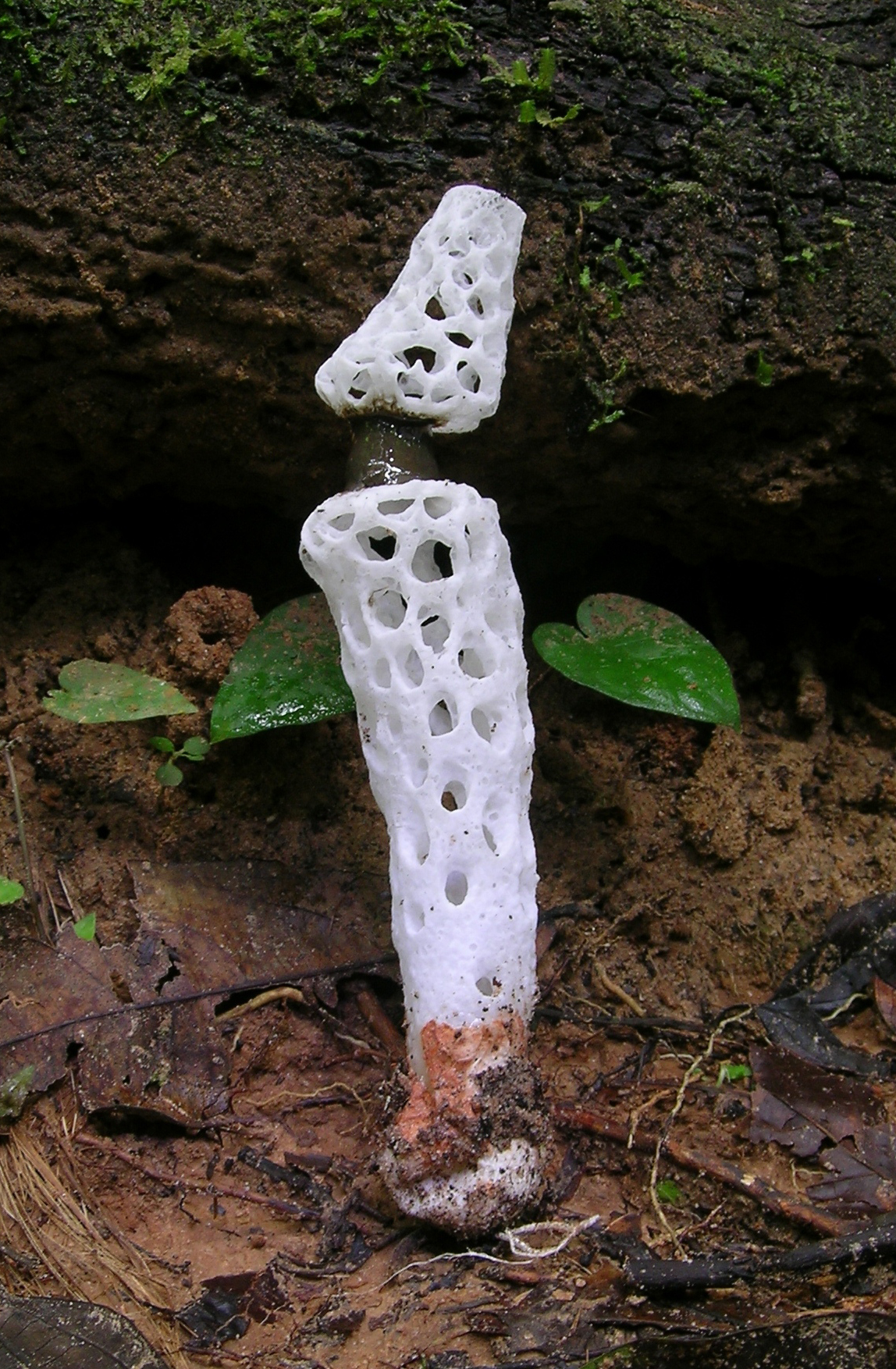
Staheliomyces cinctus was described by Fischer in 1921.

- Aseroe arachnoidea E.Fisch. (1890)
- Calostomataceae E.Fisch. (1900)
- Mattirolomyces E.Fisch. (1938)
- Melanogastraceae E.Fisch. (1933)
- Onygena arietina E.Fisch. (1897)
- Peronosporales E.Fisch. (1892)
- Petchiomyces E.Fisch. & Mattir. (1938)
- Phallales E.Fisch. (1898)
- Pisolithus kisslingii E.Fisch. (1906)
- Pisolithus marmoratus (Berk.) E.Fisch. (1900)
- Pseudohydnotrya E.Fisch. (1897)
- Puccinia actaeae-agropyri E.Fisch. (1901)
- Puccinia mayorii E.Fisch. 1904
- Saprolegniales E.Fisch. (1892)
- Staheliomyces cinctus E.Fisch. (1921)
- Terfeziaceae E.Fisch. 1897
- Tuber malacodermum E.Fisch. (1923)
- Tremellogaster E.Fisch. (1924)
- Trichocomaceae E.Fisch. (1897)

== Eponymous taxa ==
- Fischerula
- Aspergillus fischerianus Samson & W. Gams
- Aspergillus fischeri Wehmer
- Ceriomyces fischeri Corda
- Clathrus fischeri Pat. & Har.
- Claustula fischeri K.M.Curtis
- Coleosporium fischeri Mayor
- Crotalia fischeri Zambett.
- Entyloma fischeri Thüm.
- Erysiphe fischeri S. Blumer
- Golovinomyces fischeri (S. Blumer) U. Braun & R.T.A. Cook
- Hydrophora fischeri Sumst.
- Hysterangium fischeri Zeller & C.W. Dodge
- Lepiota fischeri Kauffman
- Micromycopsis fischeri Scherff.
- Peridermium fischeri Kleb.
- Phomopsis fischeri-eduardi Bubák 1916
- Poloniodiscus fischeri Svrèek & Kubièka
- Polystictus fischeri Henn.
- Puccinia fischeri Cruchet & Mayor
- Rozellopsis fischeri Cejp
- Staurothele fischeri O. Behr
- Thekopsora fischeri Cruchet
- Tilletia fischeri P. Karst.
- Tolyposporium fischeri Vánky
- Trichophyton fischeri J. Kane
- Urocystis fischeri Körn.
- Uromyces fischerianus Mayor
- Uromyces fischeri-eduardi Magnus
- Usnea fischeri G. Awasthi
- Ustilago fischeri Pass.
- Verrucaria fischeri Müll.
- Pythiomorpha fischeriana Höhnk

== Publications ==
- Berlese, A.N.; De-Toni, J.B.; Fischer, E. (1888). Sylloge Fungorum 7 (1): 1–498.
- Berlese, A.N.; De-Toni, J.B.; Fischer, E. (1888). Sylloge Fungorum 7 (2): 499.
- Fischer, E. (1886). "Zur Entwickelungsgeschichte der Fruchtkörper einiger Phalloideen. Annales du Jardin Botanique de Buitenzorg 6: 1–51.
- Fischer, E. (1888). "Zur Kenntniss der Pilzgattung Cyttaria". Botanische Zeitung 46: 813–831.
- Fischer, E. (1888). "Zur Kenntniss der Pilzgattung Cyttaria". Botanische Zeitung 48: 842–846.
- Fischer, E. (1897). "Beiträge zur Kenntnis der Schweizerischen Rostpilze". Bulletin de l’Herbier Boissier 5: 393–394.
- Fischer, E. (1909). "Studien zur Biologie von Gymnosporangium juniperinum". Zeitschrift für Botanik 1: 683–714.
- Fischer, E. (1920, publ. 1921). "Zur Kenntnis von Graphiola und Farysia". Annales Mycologici 18: 188–197.
- Eduard Fischer (1922) "Weitere Beiträge zur Kenntnis der Gattung Graphiola" (More contributions towards understanding of the genus Graphiola) in Annales Mycologici (Annals of Mycology) 20:3 pp. 228 – 237
- Fischer, E.; Albert Gäumann E.A. (1929) Biologie der pflanzenbewohnenden Pilze (Biology of the plant-inhabiting fungi)
- Fischer, E. (1933) Die natürlichen Pflanzenfamilien: Unterklasse Eubasidii. Reihe Gastromyceteae (ed. by Engler and Prantl)
