= Lysurus sphaerocephalus =

Scientific classification
- Kingdom: Fungi
- Division: Basidiomycota
- Class: Agaricomycetes
- Order: Phallales
- Family: Phallaceae
- Genus: Lysurus
- Species: L. sphaerocephalus

Binomial name
- Lysurus sphaerocephalus (Schltdl.) Hernández Caffot, Urcelay, K. Hosaka & L.S. Domínguez (2020)

Species of fungus

Lysurus sphaerocephalus or spherical-headed stinkhorn is a species of fungus in the family Phallaceae. L. sphaerocephalus is related to the more common Lysurus mokusin.

== Description ==
Lysurus sphaerocephalus features a pink stipe with a spongy texture that tapers at the bottom, peaks in width towards the top-middle before tapering to the head. The head or 'cap' features a brain-like appearance made up of a lattice-like structure with the gleba underneath.
