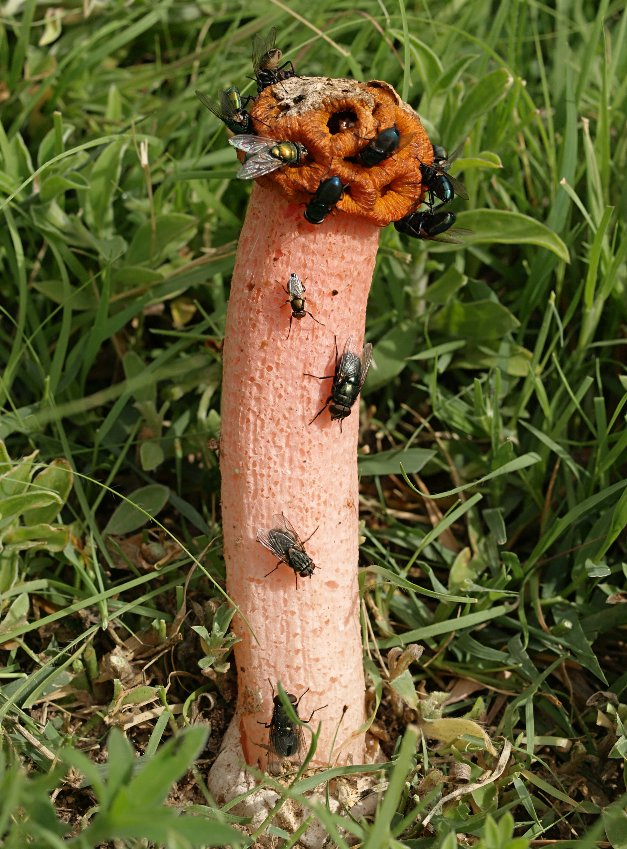

Scientific classification
- Kingdom: Fungi
- Division: Basidiomycota
- Class: Agaricomycetes
- Order: Phallales
- Family: Phallaceae
- Genus: Lysurus
- Species: L. periphragmoides

Binomial name
- Lysurus periphragmoides (Klotzsch) Dring

Synonyms
- Species synonymy: 1842 Simblum periphragmaticum Corda; 1831 Simblum periphragmoides Klotzsch; 1837 Foetidaria coccinea A.St.-Hil; 1842 Simblum periphragmaticum Corda; 1846 Simblum gracile Berk.; 1861 Simblum sphaerocephalum Schltdl.; 1866 Simblum flavescens Kurz ex Berk.; 1878 Simblum pilidiatum Ernst; 1880 Simblum rubescens W.R. Gerard; 1881 Simblum gracile var. australe Speg.; 1881 Simblum lorentzii Speg.; 1885 Simblum rubescens var. kansense Cragin; 1886 Simblum australe (Speg.) Fischer; 1899 Simblum periphragmoides var. gracile (Berk.) Penzig; 1902 Dictybole texense Atkinson & W.H.Long; 1906 Simblum coccineum (Mont.) McGinty ex Lloyd; 1907 Simblum texense (Atk. & Long) Long; 1931 Simblum clathroides Kawam.; 1942 Simblum texense var. albidum Long

= Lysurus periphragmoides =

Species of fungus

Lysurus periphragmoides, commonly known as the chambered stinkhorn, is a species of fungus in the stinkhorn family. It was originally described as Simblum periphragmoides in 1831, and has been known as many different names before being transferred to Lysurus in 1980.

The fruit body, which can extend up to 15 cm (6 in) tall, consists of a reddish latticed head (a receptaculum) placed on top of a long stalk. A dark olive-green spore mass, the gleba, fills the interior of the lattice and extends outwards between the arms. Like other members of the family Phallaceae, the gleba has a fetid odor that attracts flies and other insects to help disperse its spores.

The saprobic fungus has a pantropical distribution and has been found in Africa, Asia, Australasia, and the Americas. It grows on fertile ground and on mulch. The immature "egg" form of the fungus is considered edible.

== Taxonomy ==
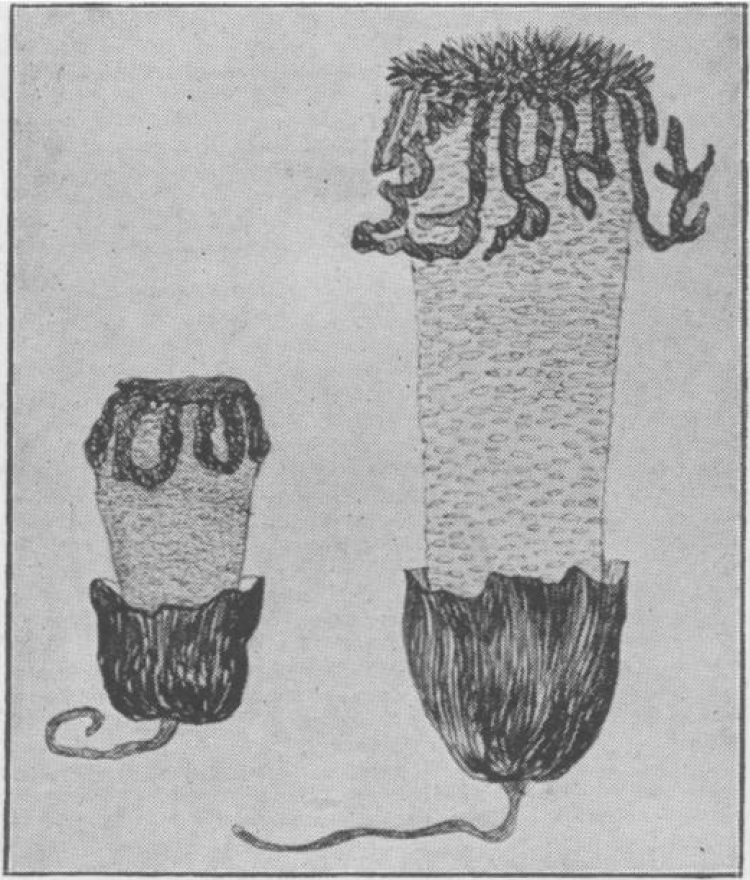
A sketch of "Dictybole texensis", a deteriorated specimen of L. periphragmoides thought by Atkinson to be a new species.

The basionym for this species is Simblum periphragmoides, first described by German mycologist Johann Friedrich Klotzsch in 1831, based on specimens collected in Bois Chéry in Mauritius. Klotzsch designated it as the type species of Simblum, a genus differentiated from the similar genus Lysurus by having the fruit body ending in a spherical, chambered head, with gleba developing within the depressions of the chambers. Lysurus periphragmoides is a morphologically variable species; as a result, it has acquired an extensive number of synonyms, as various authors have decided that the different forms warranted being designated as new species. Donald Malcolm Dring's 1980 monograph on the Clathraceae (a family that has since been subsumed into the Phallaceae) transferred the taxon to Lysurus, explaining "a distinction between "Simblum" and Lysurus in the original restricted sense cannot be easily maintained because there are examples of intermediates states", and he lumped 18 synonyms under L. periphragmoides.

In one noted example of an author being too eager to assign a new name, in 1902 George Francis Atkinson described a specimen he found in Texas, otherwise similar to Simblum but with a loose net drooping from the head; he initiated the new genus Dictybole to include his "new" species D. texense. The species was, according to mycologist Curtis Gates Lloyd, merely a decomposing or insect-damaged specimen of L. periphragmoides that had been preserved in alcohol. Lloyd criticized Atkinson's poor judgment in his self-published journal Mycological Notes, and later, humiliated him under the pen name N.J. McGinty. William H. Long later (1907) transferred Atkinson's taxon to the genus Simblum, claiming that the yellow arms and longer spores were sufficiently distinct to consider it distinct from L. periphragmoides (then known as Simblum sphaerocephalum); however, according to Dring, D. texense should also be considered a synonym of L. periphragmoides. Despite Dring's renaming, and the subsequent acceptance of his subsuming of the genus Simblum into Lysurus, the species is still occasionally referred to Simblum sphaerocephalum.

=== Etymology ===
The specific epithet periphragmoides means "fenced in all around", and refers to the latticed structure of the cap. The fungus is commonly known as the "stalked lattice stinkhorn" or "chambered stinkhorn".

== Description ==
Lysurus periphragmoides
- Mycological characteristics
- Smooth hymenium
- Cap is flat
- Hymenium attachment is irregular or not applicable
- Stipe has a volva
- Spore print is olive-brown
- Ecology is saprotrophic
- Edibility is not recommended

Immature fruiting bodies of L. periphragmoides start as round or oval "eggs" that may be up to 5 cm (2 in) in diameter. On the underside of the egg are whitish rhizomorphs that anchor it to the substrate. The peridium is white to buff-colored on the external surface, and has a gelatinous layer inside. An egg cut in half lengthwise reveals internal layers, including a tough white outer peridium, and a thick layer of firm, translucent, gelatinous matter transversed by strands (trabeculae) of denser white tissue. The strands are anastomosing partitions, connecting with the peridium externally and with the bars of the receptaculum within. The gelatinous layer is therefore divided up into many irregular longitudinal chambers.

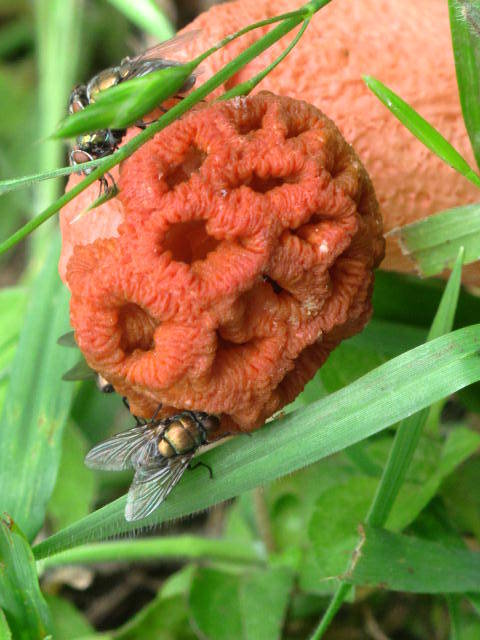
Close-up of latticed receptaculum

The egg eventually ruptures as the stalk expands and breaks through, creating a volva at the base of the stipe. In maturity, the fruit bodies, are up to 15 cm (6 in) tall, with a latticed spherical cap (the receptaculum) atop a long yellow or reddish stipe. In general, Old World specimens tend to be yellow, while New World specimens are reddish, although exceptions have been noted in the literature. The receptaculum is typically 1.5–3.5 cm (1/2–1 1/2 in) in diameter and forms a red or orange lattice, or mesh. There are typically between 20 and 100 small pentagonal to hexagonal meshes in the receptaculum; the arms of the mesh have sharp ridges on the outer surface, corrugations on the sides, and are flat to weakly ridged on the inner surface. The internal surfaces of the receptaculum are covered with an olive-green spore-bearing gleba, which sometimes seeps through the mesh holes. Like most stinkhorn species, the gleba has a foul odor, comparable to rotten meat, but it is "less-offensive" than most. The smell of fresh, newly exposed gleba has been reported to be sweet, similar to amyl acetate, the foul odor forming only after it has been exposed to air for some time.

The stipe is 5–15 cm (2–6 in) long, 0.8–3 cm (1/4–1 1/4 in) thick, hollow, and spongy. The walls of the stipe are made of an inner layer of large tubes and two or three outer layers of small tubes. Specimens may occasionally be found with fused heads on two separate stipes arising from a single volva.

A variety with a white fruit body is known, Lysurus periphragmoides var. albidum (originally described as Simblum texense var. albidum by Long). It was reported growing from sandy alkaline soil in semi-arid regions of New Mexico, but has not been reported again since Long's collections in 1941.

=== Microscopic features ===
The spores are elliptical or oblong in shape, smooth, inamyloid, and have dimensions of 3.5–4.5 by 1.5–2.5 μm. The use of scanning electron microscopy has revealed that L. periphragmoides (in addition to several other Phallales species) has a hilar scar—a small indentation in the surface of the spore where it was previously connected to the basidium via the sterigma.

=== Similar species ===
Lysurus periphragmoides is morphologically distinct, and unlikely to be confused with any other species. Within the genus, L. mokusin has an angular stipe and a receptacle of four to five clasped arms, contoured like the stipe with alternating ribs and furrows. L. cruciatus has a rounder stipe with receptacle arms that are not clasped together at maturity. The receptacle of L. gardneri, found in southeast Asia, India, and Africa, is made of five to seven reddish-brown fingers that are initially pressed together before separating.

== Habitat and distribution ==
This species is typically found growing solitary or in groups on lawns, mulch, pastures, and open woods. A North American field guide notes an association with apple orchards and cornfields.

Lysurus periphragmoides has a pantropical distribution. The fungus has been reported from Africa (Mauritius, Tanzania), Asia (Jilin Province, China, Sri Lanka, India, Pakistan, Thailand, Indonesia), Australasia (New Guinea), North America (Bahamas, Dominica, Mexico), Central America (Nicaragua) and South America (Argentina, Uruguay, Brazil, and Venezuela). The distribution extends north to the Ryukyu Islands in Asia. It is fairly common in South America, but is usually restricts its appearance to periods of wet weather in southern North America.

== Uses ==
Like many of the stinkhorns, L. periphragmoides is generally considered only edible when in its immature "egg" form.
