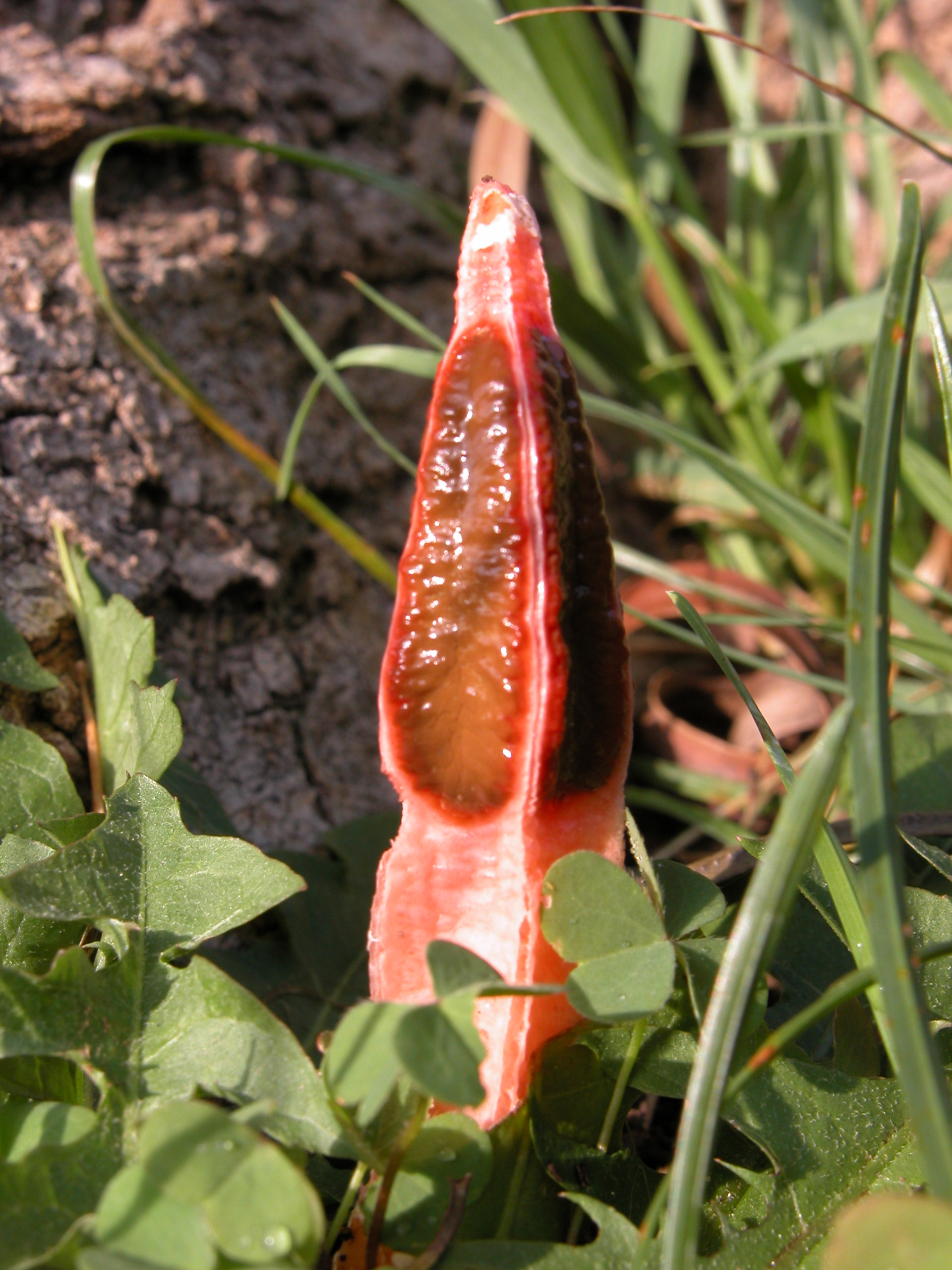

Scientific classification
- Domain: Eukaryota
- Kingdom: Fungi
- Division: Basidiomycota
- Class: Agaricomycetes
- Order: Phallales
- Family: Phallaceae
- Genus: Lysurus
- Species: L. mokusin

Binomial name
- Lysurus mokusin (Cibot ex Pers.) Fr.

Synonyms
- Species synonymy: 1899 Lysurus beauvaisii Molliard; 1906 Mutinus pentagonus var. hardyi F.M. Bailey; 1907 Mutinus pentagonus F.M. Bailey; 1913 Mutinus hardyi (F.M. Bailey) F.M. Bailey; 1917 Lysurus sinensis Lloyd; 1933 Colus pentagonus (F.M. Bailey) Sawada; 1935 Lloydia quadrangularis C.H. Chow; 1935 Lysurus kawamurensis Liou & Y.C. Wang; 1936 Sinolloydia quadrangularis (C.H. Chow) C.H. Chow; 1936 Sinolloydia sinensis (Lloyd) C.H. Chow; 1938 Lysurus mokusin f. sinensis (Lloyd) Kobayasi; 2000 Lysurus mokusin var. sinensis (Lloyd) X.L. Mao

= Lysurus mokusin =

Species of fungus

Lysurus mokusin Mycological characteristics
- Smooth hymenium
- Hymenium attachment is irregular or not applicable
- Stipe is bare
- Spore print is olive-brown
- Ecology is saprotrophic
- Edibility is not recommended

Lysurus mokusin, commonly known as the lantern stinkhorn, the small lizard's claw, or the ribbed lizard claw, is a saprobic species of fungus in the family Phallaceae. The fruit body consists of a reddish, cylindrical fluted stipe that is capped with several "arms". The arms can approach or even close in on each other to form a spire. The gleba—an olive-green slimy spore mass—is carried on the outer surface of the arms. The fruit body has an odor comparable to "fresh dog feces", "rotting flesh", or "sewage" when mature.

The fungus is native to Asia, and is also found in Australia, Europe and North America, where it is probably an introduced species. It is edible in its immature "egg" stage and has been used medicinally in China as an ulcer remedy.

== Taxonomy ==
The species was first described by the Catholic Priest and missionary Pierre-Martial Cibot in 1775, after he found it near Peking (now Beijing). This finding represents the earliest published scientific record of a fungus from China. Cibot's original name for the lantern stinkhorn, Phallus mokusin, was sanctioned by Christian Hendrik Persoon in his 1801 Synopsis Methodica Fungorum. In 1823, Elias Magnus Fries transferred it to the genus Lysurus in his Systema Mycologicum. L. mokusin is the type species of the genus Lysurus.

In 1938, Y. Kobayasi reported the form L. mokusin f. sinensis, which he said differed from the main species in having a head that was more angular and conical at the top; the form sinensis was also reported in Korea in 1995. Some authors have attempted to define forms of L. mokusin as new species based on the degree of separation of the apical arms. For example, to contrast with his concept of Lysurus in which the arms were either free or slightly fused, the genus Lloydia was created by Chow in 1935 to contain species in which the tips of the arms were fused. As a result of various differing interpretations of the limits of L. mokusin, and the desire of some authors to define new species based on perceived differences, the fungus has acquired a lengthy list of synonyms over the years. It is commonly known as the "lantern stinkhorn", the "small lizard's claw", or the "ribbed lizard claw".

Lysuris mokusin has been included in a large-scale phylogenetic analysis of Gomphoid and Phalloid fungi published in 2006, and was shown to form a clade with Simblum sphaerocephalum, Lysurus borealis, and Protubera clathroidea.

== Description ==
Immature fruit bodies of L. mokusin are white, gelatinous "eggs" measuring 1–3 cm (1/2–1 1/4 in) in diameter, and are attached to the ground by thickened strands of mycelium called rhizomorphs. As the fungus matures, the egg ruptures as the fruit body rapidly expands, leaving volval remnants behind at the base. The stipe of the hollow, spongy mature fruiting body has dimensions of 10–15 cm (4–6 in) by 1.5–2.5 cm (1/2–1 in), and ranges in color from white to pink to red, with 4–6 distinct deeply grooved sides divided lengthwise by ribs. The basis of distinction between L. mokusin and other species of Lysurus is the angular form of its stipe. The sides branch out into 4–6 arms that are fused together at the tip to form a pointed apex, resembling a spire. As the mushroom matures, the arms may spread apart. The outer surface of the arms is coated by a brownish, slimy, foul-smelling spore mass called the gleba; its fetid odor helps it attract flies and other insects to assist in spore dispersal. The odor has been compared to "fresh dog feces", "rotting flesh" or sewage.

The spores are cylindrical in shape, smooth, thin-walled, and hyaline (translucent), with dimensions of 4–6 by 2–2.5 μm. Scanning electron microscopy reveals that one end of the spores has a hilar scar—an indentation in the spore wall that results during its separation from the sterigma of the basidium. The basidia (spore-bearing cells) are usually eight-spored, and the gleba composed of chains of roughly spherical, fusiform, ellipsoid to broadly club-shaped cells that are either 6.5–7.4 by 2.8–5.6 μm or 37.1–46.3 by 18–28 μm and also mixed with filamentous cells 2.3–4.5 μm wide. The hyphae of L. mokusin have clamp connections.

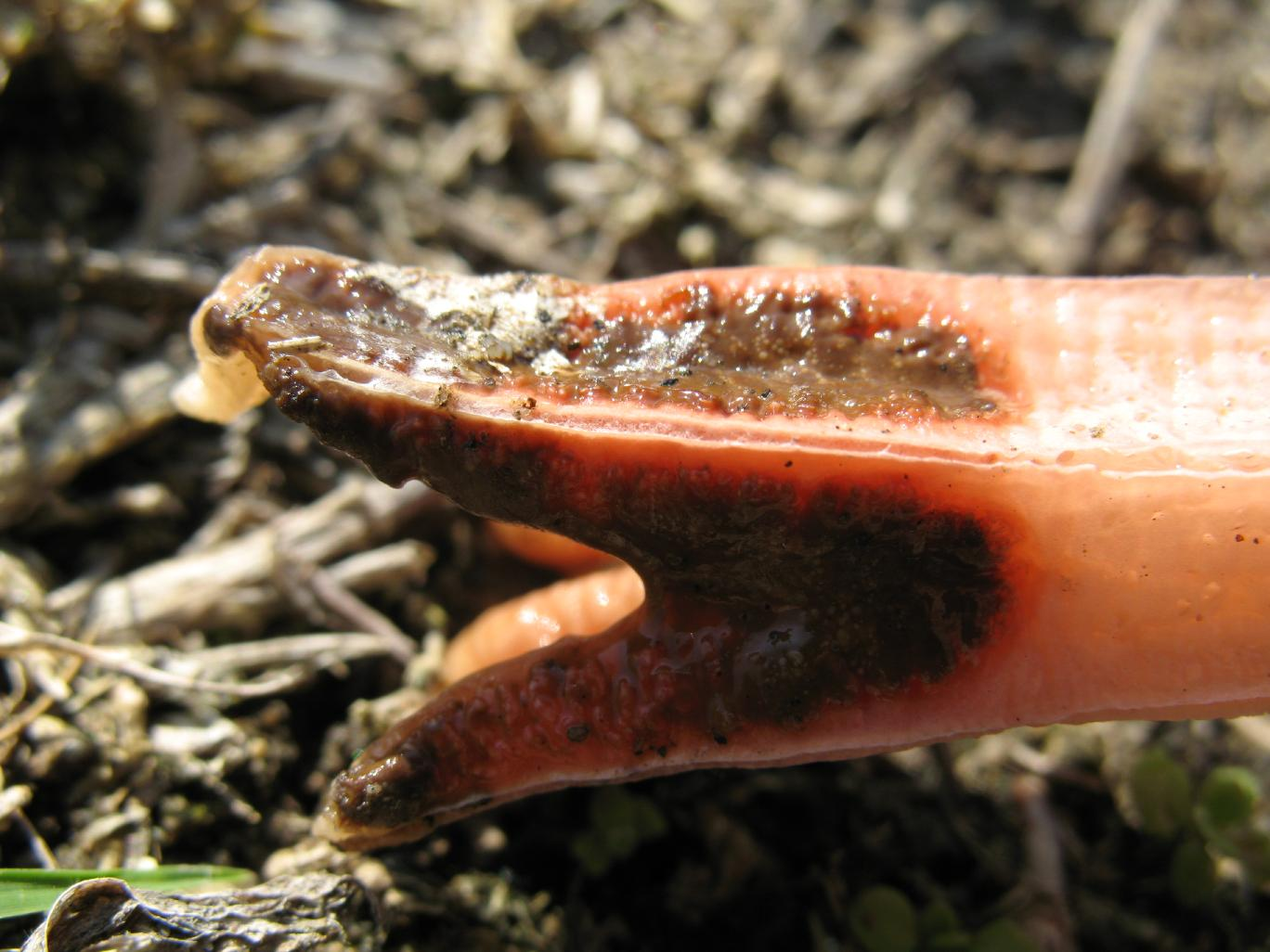
Close-up of fruit body tip, showing separation of the "arms"

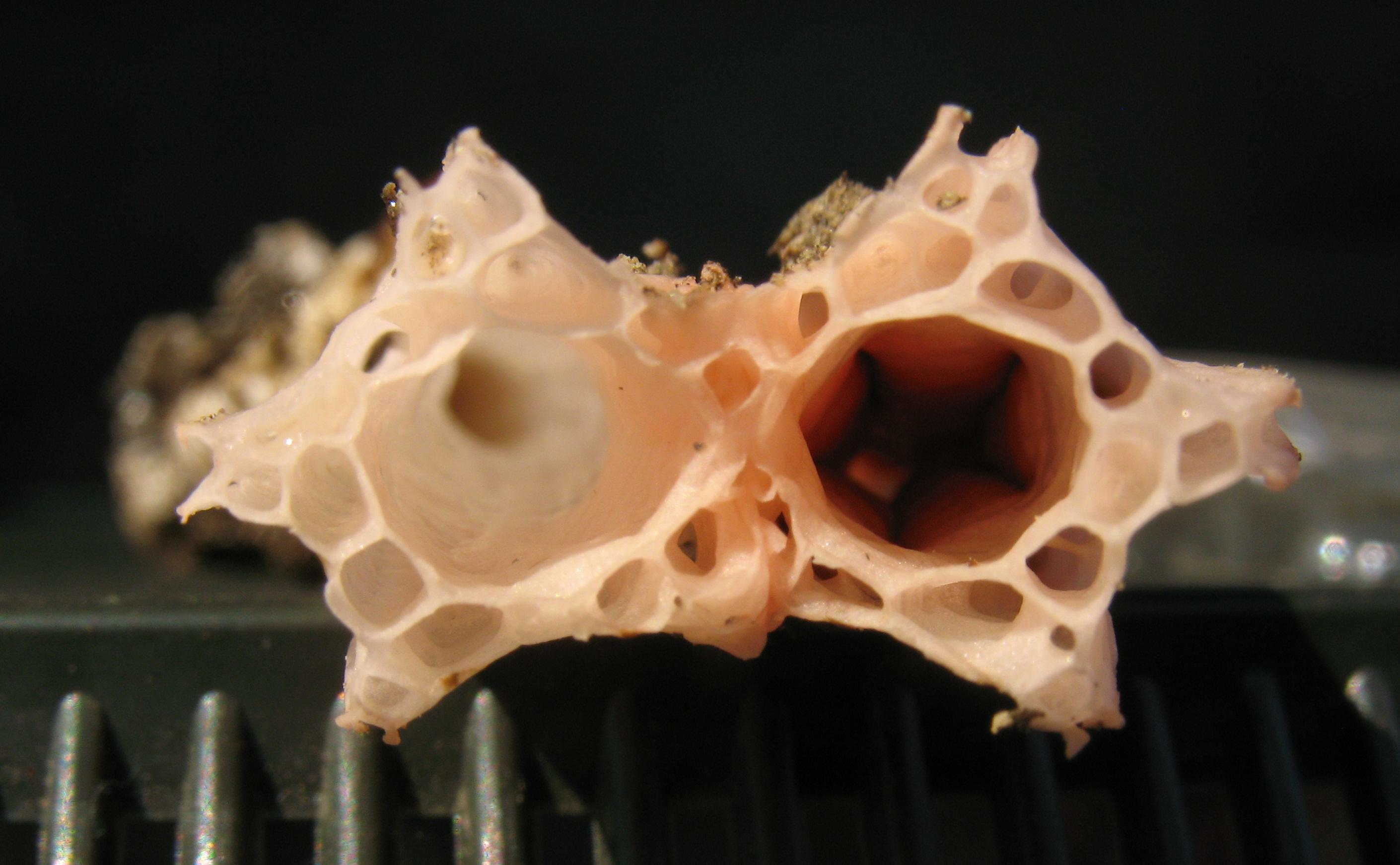
Cross-sectional view of stipe

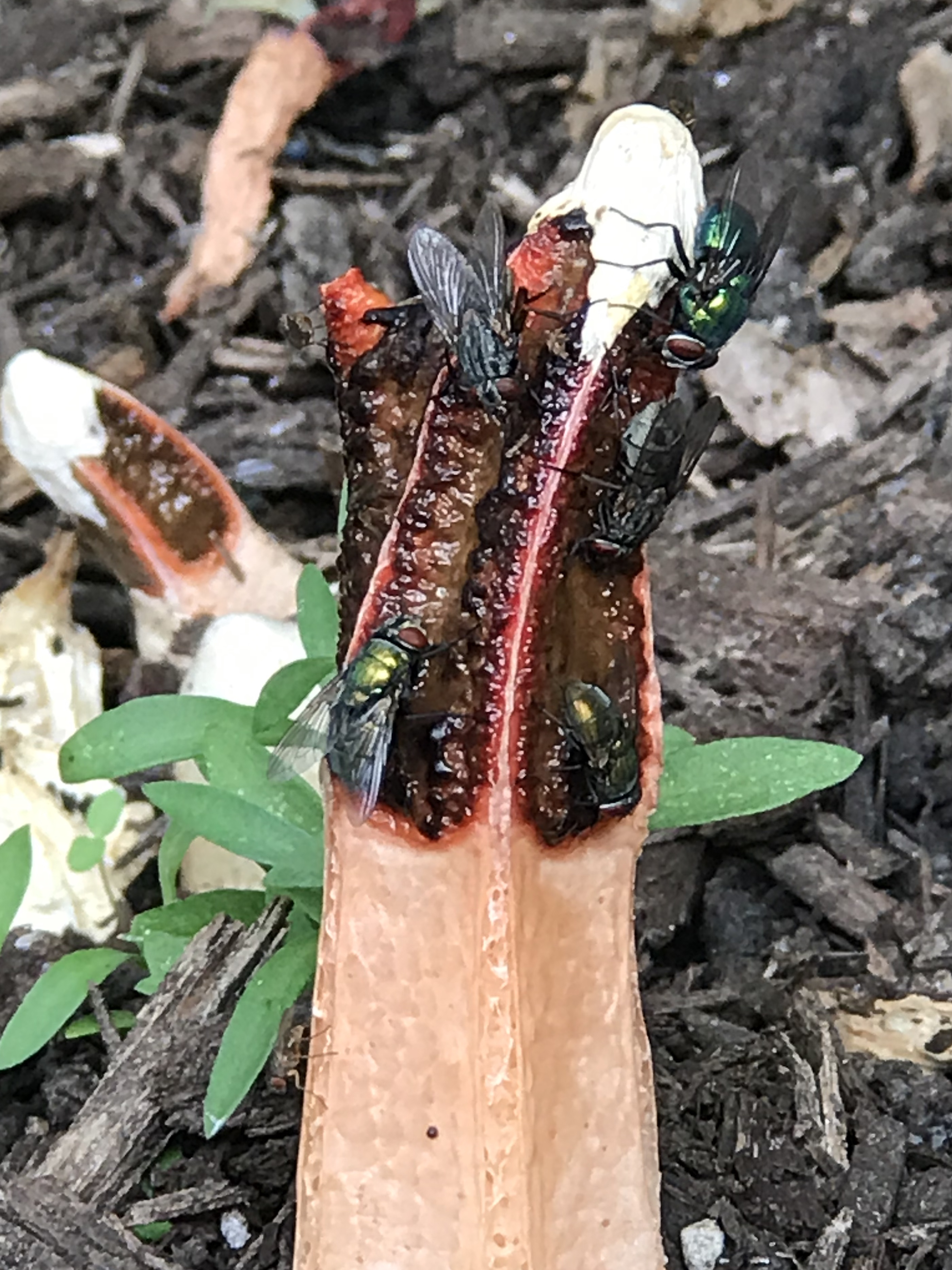
Flies attracted by the strong scent

=== Similar species ===
Lysurus cruciatus is similar is appearance to L. mokusin, but has a cylindrical stem without any flutings at the tip. Lysurus borealis is also similar, but its stipe is not fluted, and without the angles present in L. mokusin. Lysurus periphragmoides is cylindrical with a roundish lattice on top.

== Habitat and distribution ==
Lysurus mokusin is saprobic growing solitarily or in small groups in forest litter and wood chip mulch used in landscaping as well as compost. Documented sightings of L. mokusin include Australasia, the Canary Islands, Korea, Japan, China (Fujian Province), and the Bonin Islands. The species was unknown in Europe until it was reported in Italy in 1979; it is considered an alien species on that continent. In the United States, it has been collected from the states of California, Texas, Northeast Oklahoma and Washington, D.C.

== Uses ==
This species is considered to be edible when still in the immature "egg" stage and is a delicacy in China. When mature, its foul odor would deter most individuals from attempting consumption.

The fungus has been used medicinally in China as a remedy for ulcers.
