= Kurt von Fischer =

Swiss musicologist and classical pianist

- Born: 25 April 1913; Bern, Switzerland
- Died: 27 November 2003 (aged 90); Bern, Switzerland
- Father: Eduard Fischer

Kurt von Fischer (25 April 1913 – 27 November 2003) was a Swiss musicologist and classical pianist.

== Life and career ==
Fischer was born on 25 April 1913 in Bern as the son of the mycologist Eduard Fischer. Fischer studied piano at the University of the Arts Bern, which he completed in 1935 with a diploma under Franz Josef Hirt. Later he was trained by Czesław Marek. In addition, he studied musicology at the University of Bern and received his doctorate in 1938. From 1939 to 1957 he worked as a teacher at the Bern Conservatory. From 1948 to 1957 he was appointed Privatdozent at the University of Bern. From 1957 to 1979 he taught musicology as Ordinarius at the University of Zurich, from 1974 to 1976 as Dean. He has also held visiting professorships in Europe, the US and Australia. In addition, he was an honorary member of numerous scientific societies and president of the International Musicological Society from 1967 to 1972. In 1974 he was awarded the Music Prize of the Canton of Berne. In 1980 he was awarded the Hans Georg Nägeli Medal of the City of Zurich. He has corresponded with many famous personalities of the 20th century, including Inge Borkh, Alfred Cortot, György Ligeti, Arvo Pärt, Sándor Veress, Wladimir Vogel and Jean Ziegler.

Fischer, who married the pianist Esther Aerni in 1940, died on 27 November 2003 at the age of 90 in Bern.

Fischer's main areas of research were the Ars nova of the 14th century, the history of the Passions composition as well as variation and the work of Ludwig van Beethoven. The internationally renowned teacher and researcher Fischer was named Honorary Citizen of Certaldo for his services to trecento research.

== Publications ==
- Polyphonic Music of the Fourteenth Century. Monaco 1974–1991.
- Sämtliche Werke, Paul Hindemith. Mainz 1975.
- Archiv für Musikwissenschaft. Mitherausgeber Stuttgart 1952.
- Griegs Harmonik und die nordländische Folklore. Bern 1938.
- Die Beziehung von Form und Motiv in Beethovens Instrumentalwerken. Strasbourg 1948.
- Studien zur italienischen Musik des Trecento und frühen Quattrocento. Bern 1956.
- Die Variation. Cologne 1956.
- Handschriften mit mehrstimmiger Musik des 14., 15. und 16. Jahrhunderts. Répertoire international des sources musicales. B. 4, 3–4. Munich 1972.
- Essays in Musicology. New York 1989.
- Wege zu Bach. Jahresgabe 1991 der Internationalen Bach-Gesellschaft Schaffhausen. Wiesbaden 1992.
- Die Passion: Musik zwischen Kunst und Kirche. Kassel 1997.
