= Lysurus pakistanicus =

Scientific classification
- Domain: Eukaryota
- Kingdom: Fungi
- Division: Basidiomycota
- Class: Agaricomycetes
- Order: Phallales
- Family: Phallaceae
- Genus: Lysurus
- Species: L. pakistanicus

Binomial name
- Lysurus pakistanicus S.H.Iqbal, Kasuya, Khalid & Niazi (2006)

Species of fungus

Lysurus pakistanicus is a species of fungus in the stinkhorn family. Found in Pakistan, it was first described scientifically in 2006 from a specimen collected on the lawn of the campus of the University of the Punjab in Lahore. The fruit bodies features a clathrate (latticelike) netted head atop a short stipe. It has spores measuring 1.75–2.15 by 3.85–5.25 μm.
