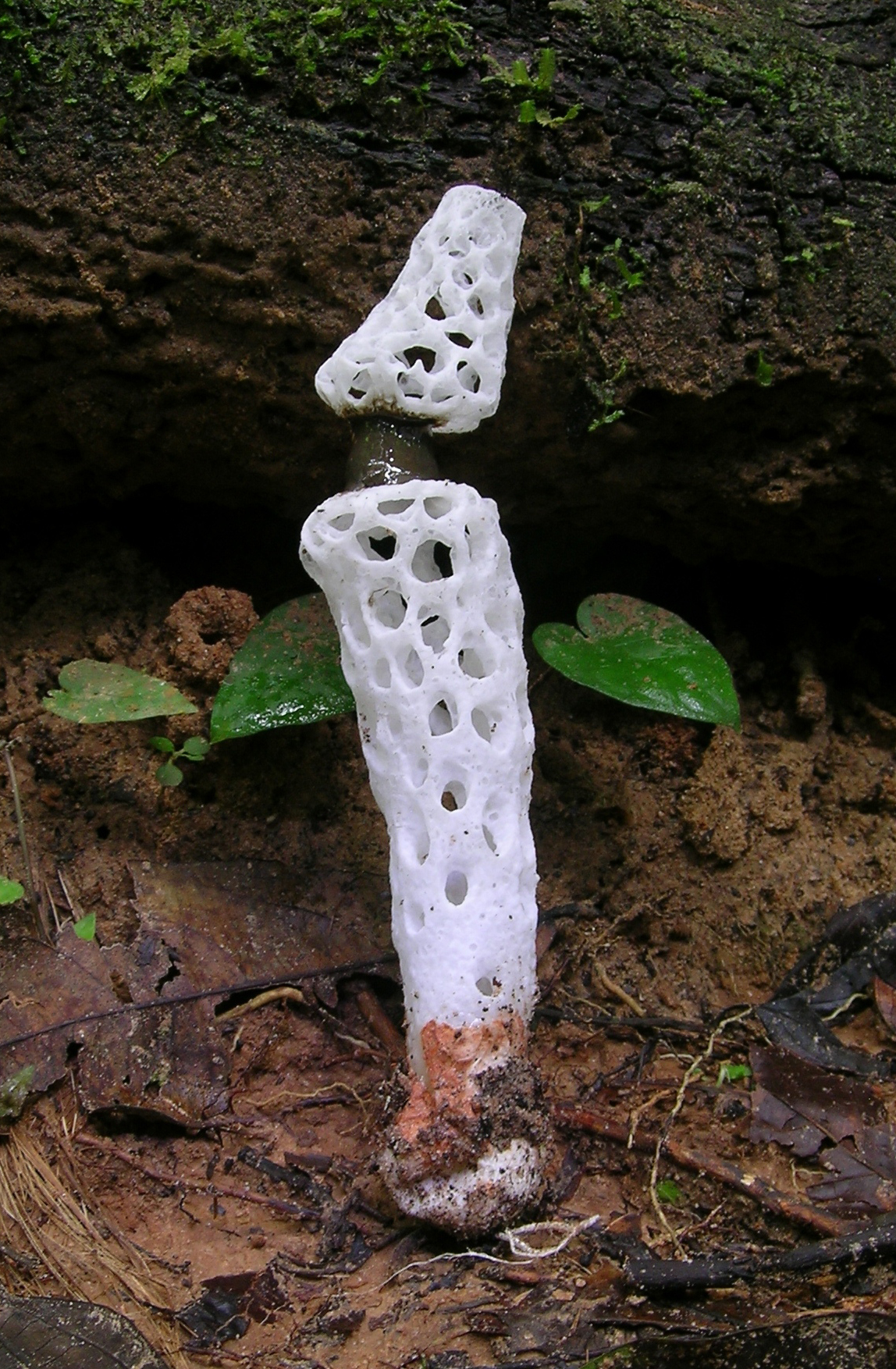

Scientific classification
- Kingdom: Fungi
- Division: Basidiomycota
- Class: Agaricomycetes
- Order: Phallales
- Family: Phallaceae
- Genus: Staheliomyces; E.Fisch. (1921)

Type species
- Staheliomyces cinctus E.Fisch. (1921)

= Staheliomyces =

Genus of fungi

Staheliomyces cinctus
- Mycological characteristics
- Glebal hymenium
- No distinct cap
- Spore print is olive-brown
- Ecology is saprotrophic
- Edibility is unknown

Staheliomyces is a fungal genus in the stinkhorn family. The genus was considered monotypic for over 100 years, containing the single neotropical species Staheliomyces cinctus, until a 2022 study revealed four additional, cryptic species. Members are colloquially known as the strangled stinkhorns. The genus is found in Central America and northern South America. The fruit body of the fungus is a hollow, whitish, cylindric stalk up to 16 cm (6.3 in) tall, with conspicuous pits and holes. Near the top of the stalk is a pinched-off zone covered with unpleasant-smelling slimy spore mass called gleba. The gleba attracts stingless bees that help disseminate the spores.

== Taxonomy ==
The genus was first described scientifically by the German mycologist Eduard Fischer in 1921. The specific epithet honors Gerold Stahel (1887 - 1955) a Swiss botanist who collected the type specimen in Suriname. The fungus has been called the "strangled stinkhorn".

== Description ==
Like all stinkhorns, the fruit body begins its development as a partially submerged "egg" form attached to rhizomorphs. The egg is roughly ovoid, measuring 1.5 to 2 cm (0.6 to 0.8 in) by 1.2–1.6 cm (0.5–0.6 in). The fruit body consists of a spongy, hollow white stalk between 12–16 cm (4.7–6.3 in) tall, with a collar of greenish-brown gleba positioned above the center, but below the apex. The glebal band is constricted compared to the width of the remainder of the stalk, between 1 and 2 cm (0.4 and 0.8 in) thick. The cap, or receptaculum, is at the top of the stalk; it is spongy, conical, and chambered, free from gleba. A volva sits at the base of the stem, and has rhizomorphs attached to it. The spores are elliptical, hyaline (translucent), and measure 2.5–3 by 1.2–1.5 μm. The edibility of the mushroom is unknown.

== Habitat and distribution ==
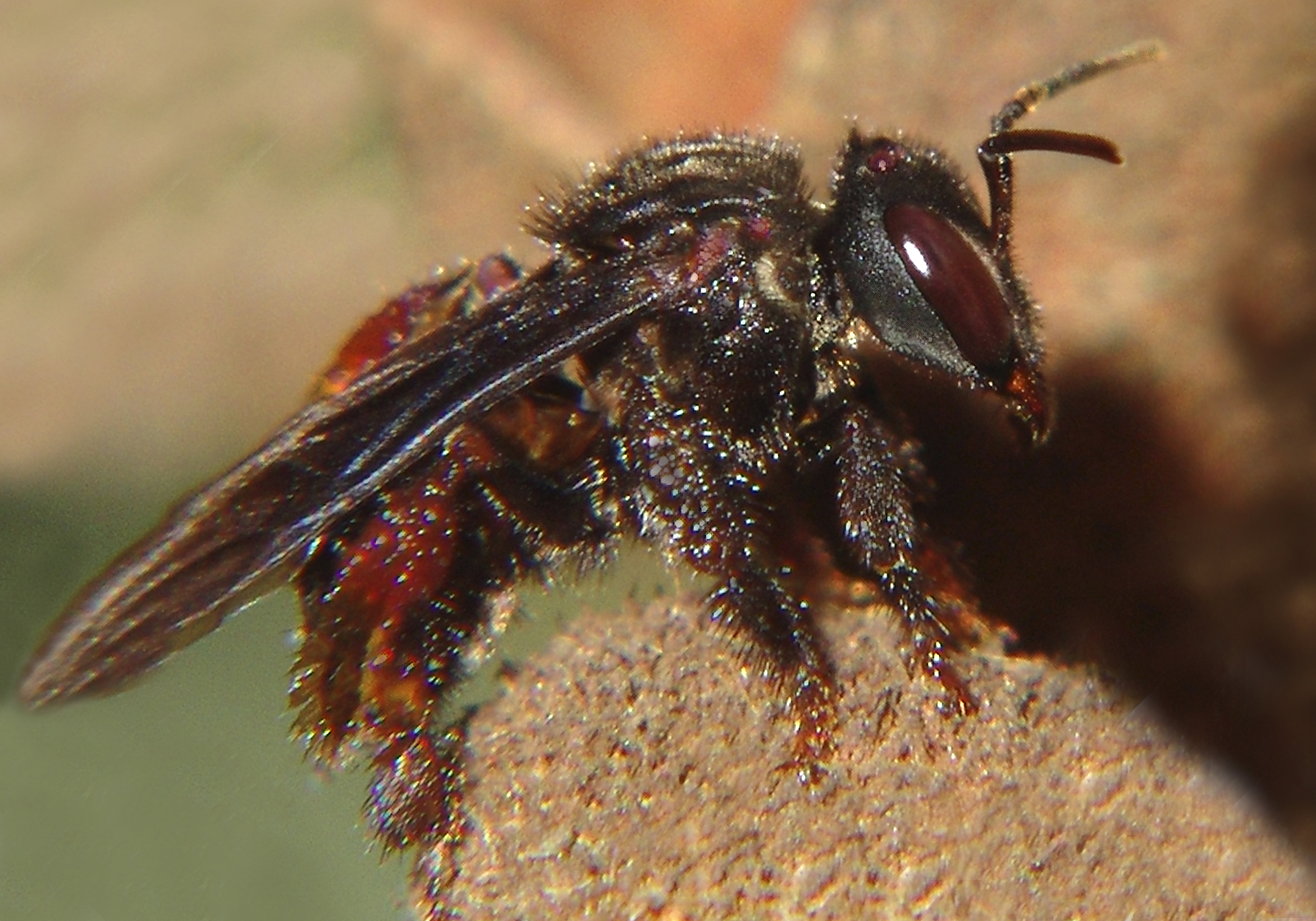
Trigona spinipes

Staheliomyces is a saprobic genus, typically found in soil rich with decomposing plant remains. It is distributed from southern Mexico to southern Brazil, where it appears during rainy seasons.

A field study from Ecuador reported that the fruit bodies of Staheliomyces are visited by species from the stingless bee genus Trigona. The bee visits are several minutes in duration, during which time small portions of the gleba are collected and stored in the pollen basket (corbiculae) of the hind legs. The authors determined that the corbiculae of approaching bees are always empty. Bee corbiculae are normally used to carry food and nest-building material, and the gleba of Staheliomyces may be used for one of these purposes, but the authors did not observe the bees after they had collected the gleba.

== Species ==
- Staheliomyces cinctus
- Staheliomyces costariquensis
- Staheliomyces cylindricus
- Staheliomyces quadratus
- Staheliomyces candeliformis
