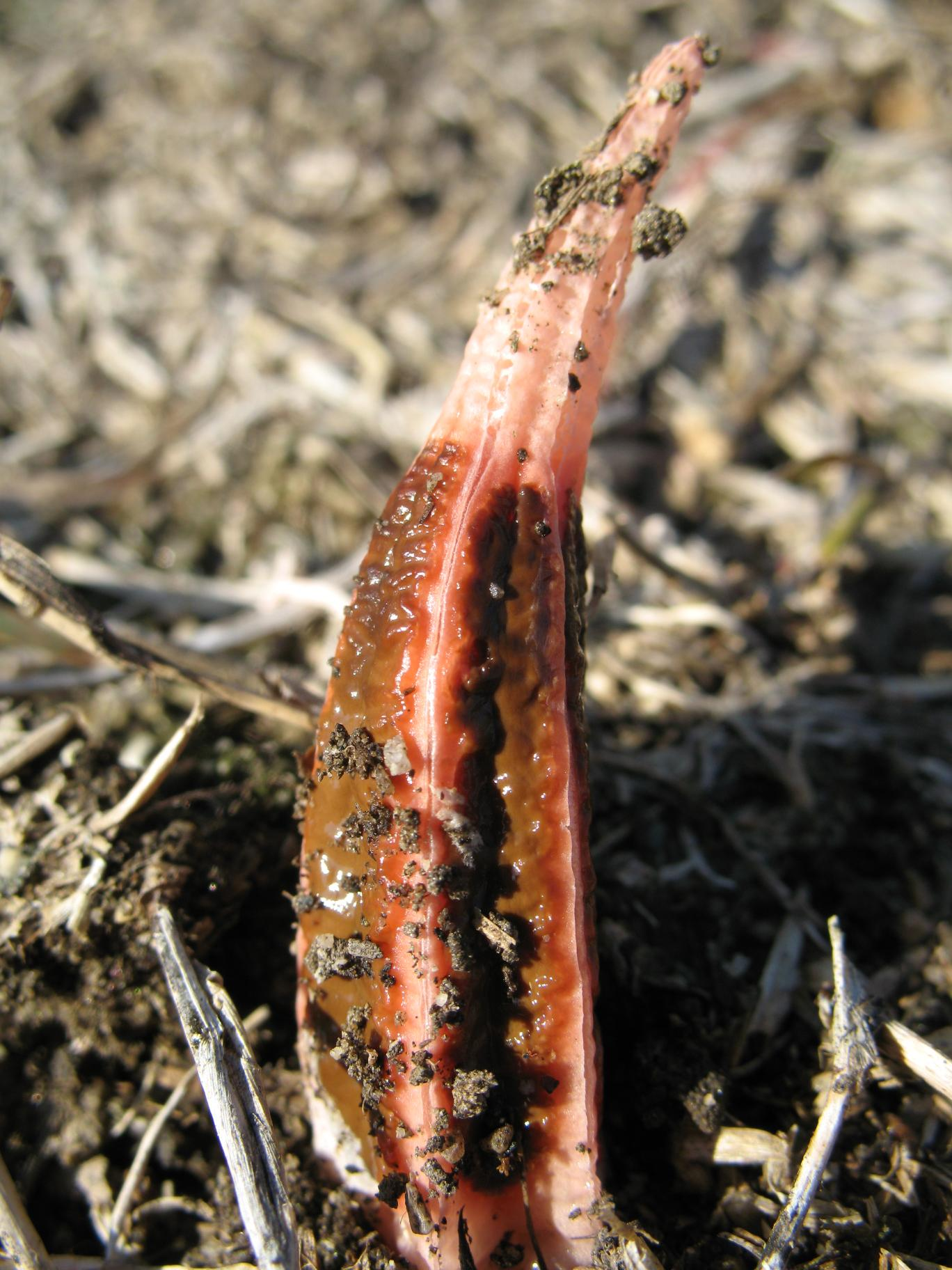
- Lysurus mokusin

Scientific classification
- Kingdom: Fungi
- Division: Basidiomycota
- Class: Agaricomycetes
- Order: Phallales
- Family: Phallaceae
- Genus: Lysurus; Fr. (1823)

Type species
- Lysurus mokusin (L.) Fr. (1823)

Synonyms
- List: Simblum Klotzsch ex Hook. (1831); Foetidaria A.St.-Hil. (1835); Calathiscus Mont. (1841); Lysurus sect. Schizmaturus Corda (1854); Lysurus sect. Desmaturus Schltdl. (1862); Kalchbrennera Berk. (1876); Desmaturus (Schltdl.) Kalchbr. (1880); Schizmaturus (Corda) (Kalchbr. 1880); Dictyobole Atkinson (1902); Pharus Petch (1919); Kupsura Lloyd (1924); Mycopharus Petch (1926); Lloydia C.H.Chow (1935); Sinolloydia C.H.Chow (1936)

= Lysurus (fungus) =

Genus of fungi

Lysurus is a genus of fungi in the Phallaceae, a family known collectively as the stinkhorn fungi. The species have a widespread distribution, but are specially prevalent in tropical areas.

== Description ==
The fruit bodies of Lysurus fungi are characterized by having short, thick arms which are upright, and may separate slightly in age. The inner surfaces of the arms are covered with a slimy spore mass called gleba, which typically has a fetid smell to attract insects to assist in spore dispersal. Viewed with a light microscope, Lysurus spores are narrowly ellipsoidal in shape, brownish in color, and have dimensions of 4–5 by 1.5–2 μm.

== Species ==
The following species are recognised in the genus Lysurus:

- Lysurus arachnoideus (E. Fisch.) Trierv.-Per. & K. Hosaka (2014)
- Lysurus argentinus Speg. (1887)
- Lysurus aseroeformis Corda (1854)
- Lysurus borealis (Burt) Henn. (1902)
- Lysurus clarazianus (Müll. Arg.) Henn. (1902)
- Lysurus congolensis Beeli (1927)
- Lysurus corallocephalus Welw. & Curr. (1868)
- Lysurus cruciatus (Lepr. & Mont.) Henn. (1902)
- Lysurus gardneri Berk. (1846)
- Lysurus habungianus G. Gogoi & Parkash (2015)
- Lysurus mokusin (L. f.) Fr. (1823)
- Lysurus pakistanicus S.H. Iqbal, Kasuya, Khalid & Niazi (2006)
- Lysurus periphragmoides (Klotzsch ex Hook.) Dring (1980)
- Lysurus pusillus Coker (1945)
- Lysurus sanctae-catharinae (E. Fisch.) Henn. (1902)
- Lysurus sphaerocephalus (Schltdl.) Hern. Caff., Urcelay, K. Hosaka & L.S. Domínguez (2020)
- Lysurus tenuis F.M. Bailey (1911)
- Lysurus texensis Ellis ex Sacc. (1888)
- Lysurus woodii (MacOwan) Henn. (1902)
