= Robert Kempner =

German-American lawyer

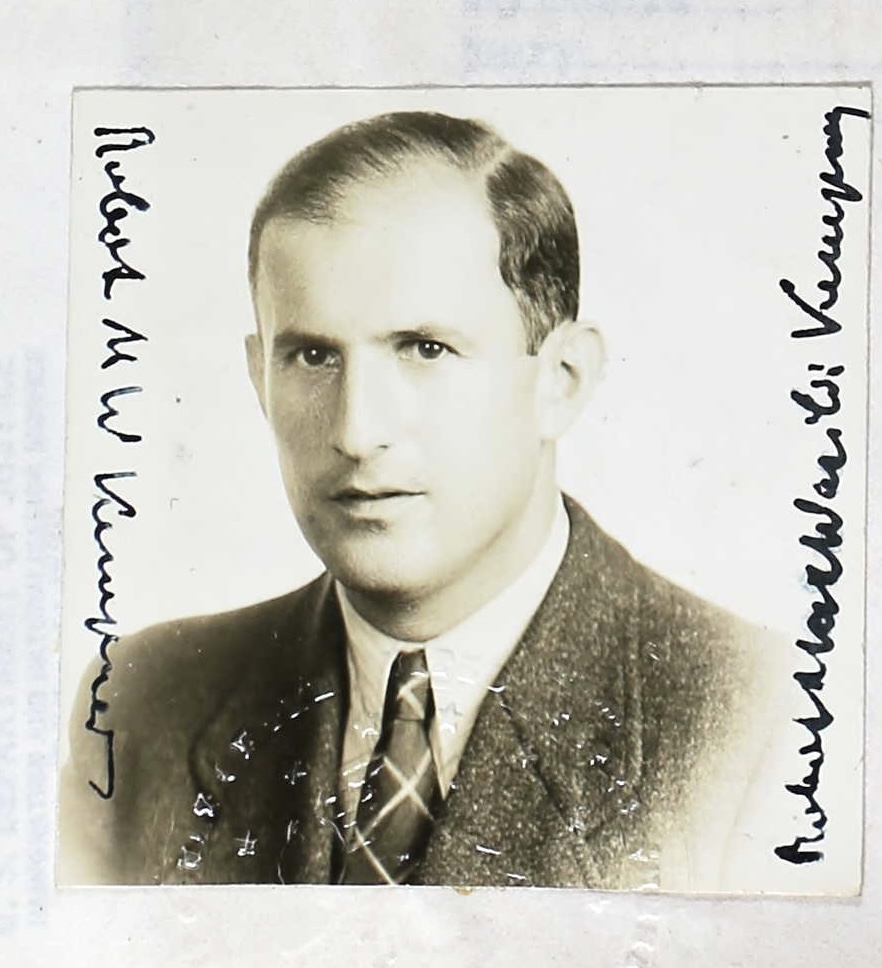
- Born: Robert Max Wasilii Kempner; 17 October 1899; Freiburg, Germany
- Died: 15 August 1993 (aged 93); Königstein im Taunus, Germany
- Education: University of Berlin; University of Breslau; University of Freiburg
- Occupation: Lawyer
- Known for: Served as assistant U.S. chief counsel during the International Military Tribunal at Nuremberg
- Spouse: Ruth Benedicta Kempner
- Children: Lucian Kempner; Andre Kempner

Robert Max Wasilii Kempner (17 October 1899 – 15 August 1993) was a German-American lawyer of Jewish descent who played a prominent role during the Weimar Republic and who later served as assistant U.S. chief counsel during the International Military Tribunal at Nuremberg. Kempner studied law at the University of Freiburg and served as a public prosecutor in Berlin during the 1920s. In 1928, he was appointed chief legal adviser in the Prussian Ministry of the Interior. In this role he sought to prosecute Adolf Hitler for high treason and to ban the Nazi Party.

After the Nazi Party's rise to power in 1933, Kempner was dismissed from the ministry and had his citizenship revoked because he was Jewish. He fled Germany in 1935. He settled in Italy, where he taught law, and moved to the United States in 1939. In the United States he became an adviser to the government, and he returned to his native country to take part in the Nuremberg trials in 1945. After the trials he remained in Germany, where he practised as a lawyer in Frankfurt from 1951. He died in Königstein im Taunus.

== Early life ==
Robert Max Wasilii Kempner was born in Freiburg, Germany, on 17 October 1899. He was the son of Walter Kempner and Lydia Rabinowitsch-Kempner, who were both microbiologists and regarded as one of the prominent scientist couples of their time. His mother was the second woman to become a professor in Prussia.

He studied law, political science and other subjects at the universities of Berlin, Breslau and Freiburg.

== Career ==
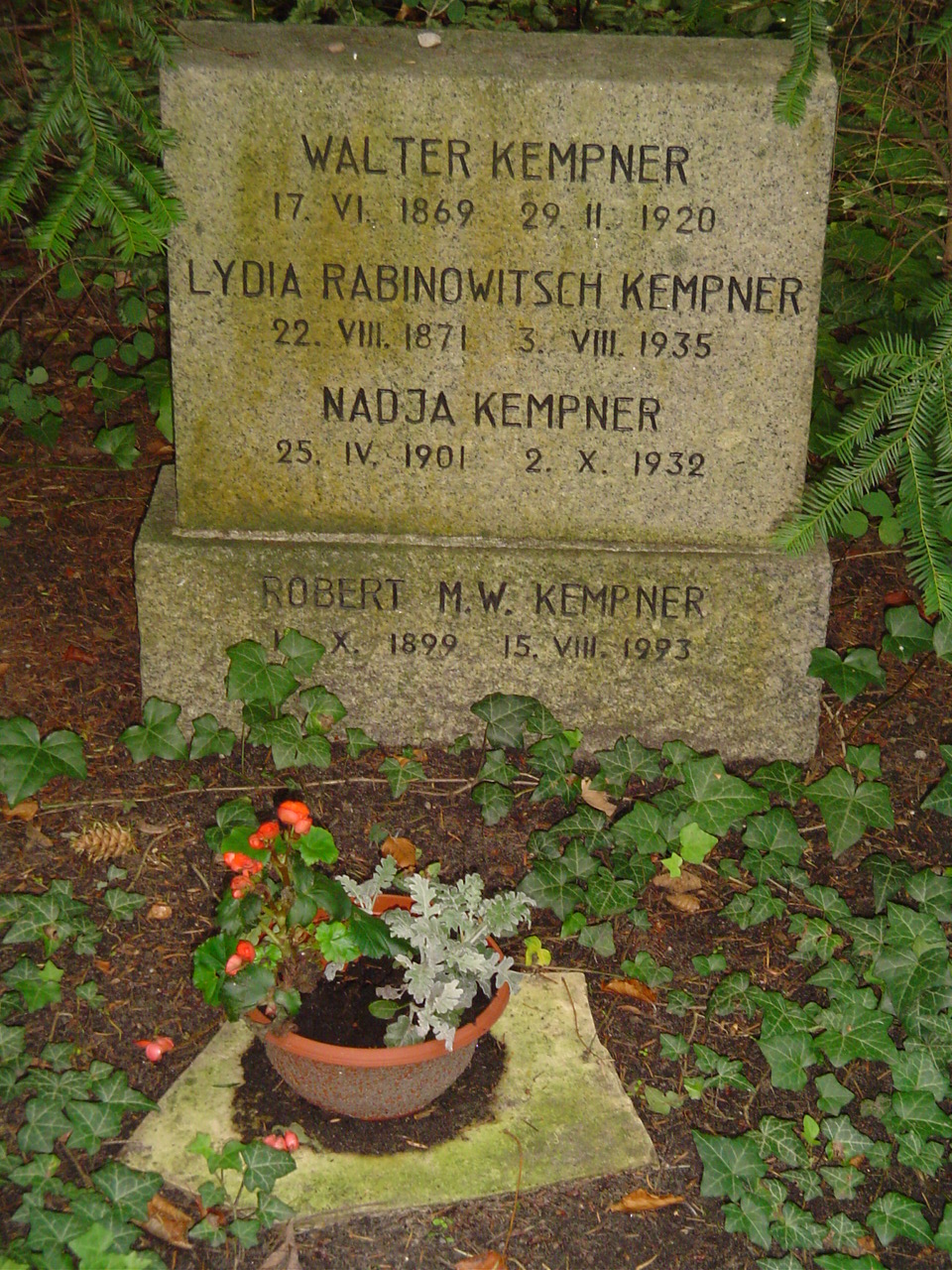
Grave of Kempner, his parents and sister in Berlin

As a law student Kempner sat as an observer in the trial against Soghomon Tehlirian, who had assassinated Talaat Pasha in 1921, and made his defence an impeachment on the Armenian genocide and Talaat's involvement in it. After finishing his studies Kempner became a successful lawyer in Berlin during the 1920s, and then advanced to chief legal advisor to the Prussian police in 1928. In 1935, Wilhelm Frick revoked Kempner's German citizenship, forcing him to emigrate to Italy and then later to the United States. He became an opponent of Nazism and left Germany after Hitler came to power, settling in the United States. There, he did research on European dictatorships at the University of Pennsylvania and was a consultant to the Department of Justice and other government agencies.

After World War II Kempner returned to Germany, the land of his birth, to serve as assistant U.S. chief counsel during the International Military Tribunal at Nuremberg. In a reversal of fortune, Kempner would prosecute two of his former superiors and persecutors — Göring and Frick. More familiar with the German legal system than any other member of the Allied staff, Kempner headed the Defense Rebuttal Section, the team responsible for anticipating the defense strategies of the accused and for preparing cross-examinations.

Kempner also presented the case against his old nemesis Wilhelm Frick. This irony was not lost on the American press. One headline read, "Man He Exiled Presents Case Against Frick." Kempner also served as counsel at the 1947–1948 trial of the German Foreign Office and is credited with finding the text of the Wannsee Protocol, a critical historical document in the history of the Holocaust. After Nuremberg, Kempner split his time between the United States and Germany where he represented Jewish clients in restitution cases against Germany. He also appeared as an expert witness at the trial of Adolf Eichmann in Jerusalem in 1961.

When Kempner left the Nuremberg trials in the mid-1940s, he took away thousands of trial documents, which he brought back to his home in Lansdowne, Pennsylvania. According to Patricia Cohen, who refers to the United States Holocaust Memorial Museum in Washington, the prosecutor's office gave Kempner permission to take the documents away, but according to the U.S. Immigration and Customs Enforcement (ICE), the removal of documents by Kempner was contrary to law and proper procedure. Most significant among this historic cache was the diary of Alfred Rosenberg, one of Hitler's most long-standing leading supporters, who had been convicted and hanged for his war crimes in 1946. The loose-leaf diary pages, dating from 1936 through 1944, passed through various hands after Kempner's death at age 93 in 1993, until they were reported to have been finally recovered by U.S. ICE agents in June 2013.

Rosenberg's diary is now in the possession of the United States Holocaust Memorial Museum for examination.

== Personal life ==
Kempner was married to Ruth Kempner with two sons, Lucian and André, four grandchildren and two great-grandchildren. In 1993, at age 93, Kempner died in Frankfurt, Germany, where he practiced law. His wife, Ruth, died in 1983. Kempner was buried in Berlin.
