= Ludwig Fischer (botanist) =

Swiss botanist (1828–1907)

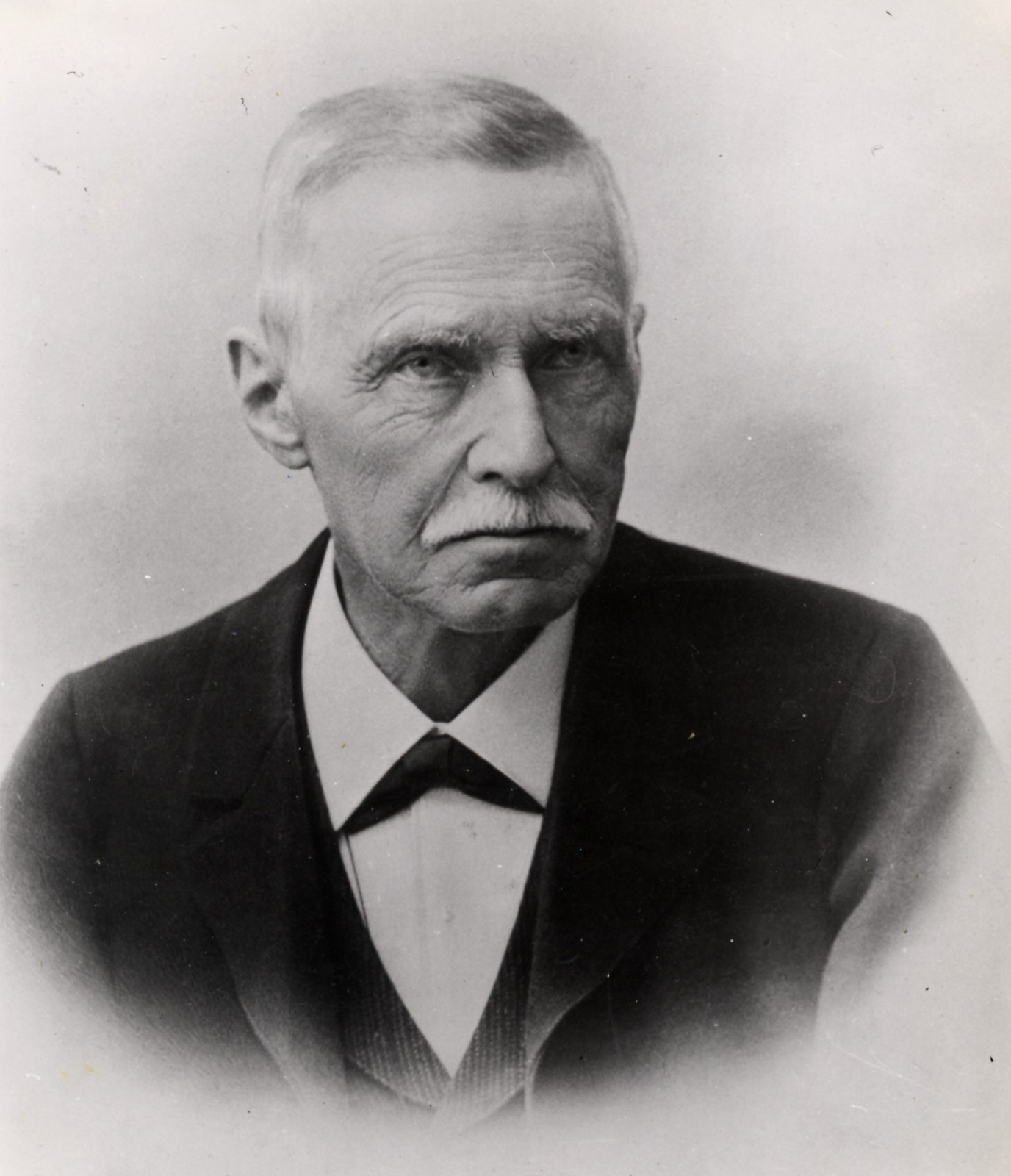
Ludwig Fischer

Emanuel Friedrich Ludwig Fischer (31 January 1828, Bern – 21 May 1907, Bern) was a Swiss botanist. He conducted research on both phanerogams and cryptogams, native to the canton of Bern. He was the father of mycologist Eduard Fischer.

He initially trained as a pharmacist, and later studied botany at the universities of Jena, Berlin and Zürich. In 1860 he became an associate professor and director of the botanical gardens at Bern. From 1863 to 1897 he was a full professor of botany at the University of Bern.

== Selected works ==
- Taschenbuch der flora von Bern, 1855 – Handbook on the flora of Bern.
- Verzeichniss der phanerogamen und gefässkryptogamen des Berner-oberlandes und der umgebungen von Thun, 1862 – Directory of phanerogams and vascular cryptogams of the Bernese Oberland and the environs of Thun.
- Der botanische garten in Bern : Gegründet 1860. Kurze Darstellung der Einrichtungen und der wichtigsten Pflanzen desselben, 1866 – The botanical gardens in Bern: Established 1860. Summary of the facilities and its most important plants.
- Flora von Bern. Systematische uebersicht der in der gegend von Bern wildwachsenden und allgemein cultivirten phanerogamen und gefässkryptogamen, 1888 – Flora of Bern, etc.
