= Ernst Albert Gäumann =

Swiss botanist and mycologist (1893–1963)

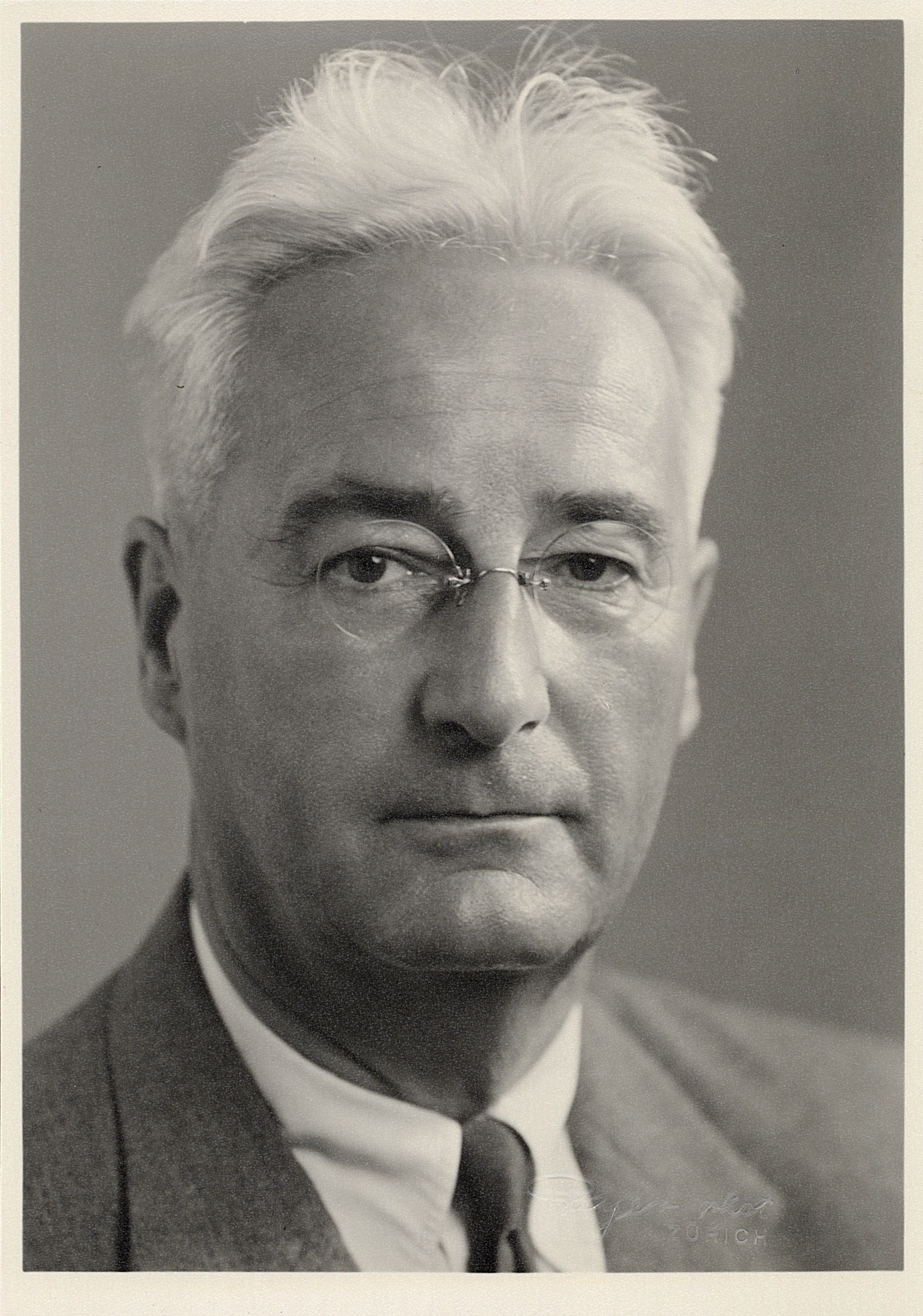
- Born: 6 October 1893; Lyss, Canton of Bern, Switzerland
- Died: 5 December 1963 (aged 70)
- Education: University of Bern (Ph.D., 1917)
- Known for: Work in plant pathology
- Awards: Marcel Benoist Prize (1945)
- Scientific career
- Fields: Botany, mycology, plant pathology
- Workplaces: Swiss Federal Institute of Technology
- Doctoral advisor: Eduard Fischer
- Author abbrev. (botany): Gäum.

Ernst Albert Gäumann (6 October 1893 – 5 December 1963) was a Swiss botanist and mycologist who made contributions to plant pathology. As professor and director of the Institute for Special Botany at the Swiss Federal Institute of Technology from 1927 until his death, he authored over 250 scientific publications, including influential works on fungal morphology and plant infections. Gäumann was particularly renowned for his pioneering research on rust fungi, fungal toxins, and plant defence mechanisms. His groundbreaking work on host-specific toxins and wilt diseases established foundational concepts in phytopathology. For his contributions to science, he received numerous accolades, including the Marcel Benoist Prize, honorary doctorates from several universities, and membership in the French Academy of Sciences.

== Early life and education ==
Born in Lyss, Canton of Bern, he obtained his early education in Biel, experiencing both German and French languages and cultures. Studying with Eduard Fischer at the University of Bern, Gäumann received his PhD in 1917 for his research on Peronospora, a genus of water moulds.

== Professional career ==
After travels and studies in Sweden, the United States, and the East Indies, Gäumann worked as a plant pathologist in Buitenzorg, Java, from 1919 to 1922. He returned to Switzerland, serving as a botanist at the Swiss Agricultural Research Station in Oerlikon, Zurich, from 1922 to 1927. In 1927, he succeeded Carl Schröter as Professor and Director of the Institute for Special Botany at the Swiss Federal Institute of Technology, holding this position until his death.

At ETH Zürich, Gäumann greatly expanded research facilities, establishing modern laboratories, temperature-controlled environments, greenhouses, libraries, herbaria, and experimental gardens, making the institute a centre for international mycological and plant pathological research. He supervised 82 doctoral theses and authored over 250 scientific publications, collaborating closely with a large team of scientists.

== Research contributions and legacy ==
Gäumann's research interests encompassed plant pathology, soil algae, rust fungi, fungal evolution, and the physiology of plant diseases. In 1926, at age 33, he published Vergleichende Morphologie der Pilze, an influential textbook translated into English and widely regarded as a standard mycological reference. His groundbreaking 1946 book Pflanzliche Infektionslehre was the first comprehensive modern treatment of plant pathology, translated into English, Polish, Russian, and Chinese. This work significantly advanced theoretical phytopathology, placing it on equal footing with other biological disciplines.

He was especially renowned for his detailed studies of rust fungi, publishing the extensive monograph Die Rostpilze Mitteleuropas (1959), which systematically classified European rust fungi based on morphological and developmental characteristics. Gäumann emphasised the narrow species concept in fungal taxonomy, significantly refining rust fungi classification.

Gäumann's laboratory conducted pioneering experiments on fungal toxins and plant defence mechanisms. His early research proposed that pathogens produce specific toxins affecting host plants, laying foundational concepts for future studies in host-specific toxins and biological control methods. He studied wilt diseases, particularly those caused by Fusarium lycopersici, identifying toxins (e.g., lycomarasmin) responsible for symptoms in plants, influencing future physiological and biochemical phytopathological research.

Gäumann was also involved in numerous scientific societies and editorial roles. He edited the Berichte der Schweizerischen Botanischen Gesellschaft from 1931 until his death and served as co-editor of Phytopathologische Zeitschrift and Fortschritte der Botanik. He also presided over the Cryptogam Commission of the Swiss Society of Natural Sciences, overseeing extensive studies on Swiss fungi.

Throughout his career, Gäumann received numerous accolades, including honorary doctorates from the Sorbonne (1953), the University of Bonn (1956), Montpellier (1959), and Bordeaux (1961). He was awarded the Marcel Benoist Prize in 1946, appointed a foreign associate of the French Academy of Sciences in 1955, and received the Otto-Appel Medal from the German Phytopathological Society in 1962.

Gäumann's legacy endures through his extensive contributions to mycology and plant pathology, as well as his influential teaching methods and emphasis on integrating cultural awareness and biological principles in education.
