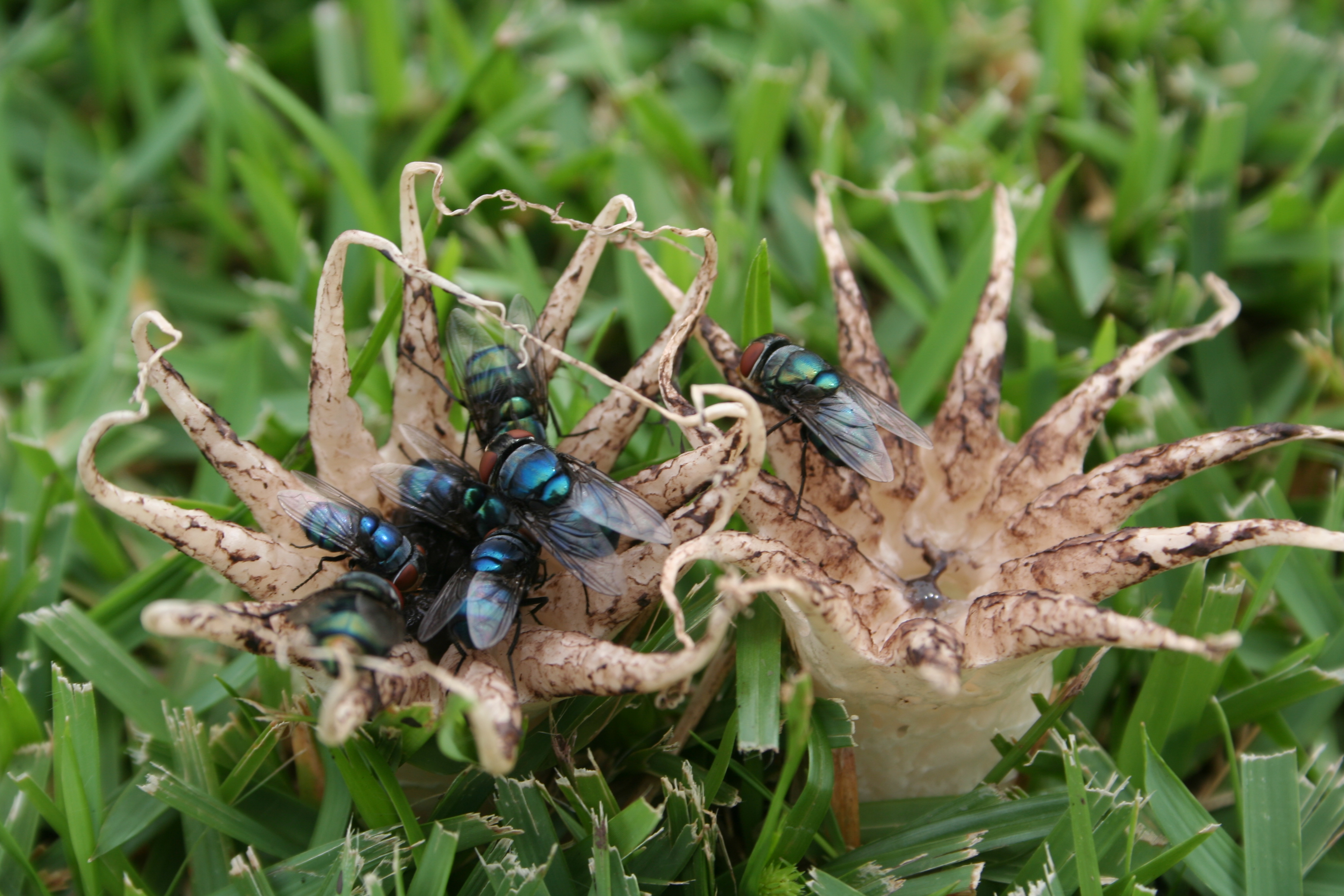

Scientific classification
- Kingdom: Fungi
- Division: Basidiomycota
- Class: Agaricomycetes
- Order: Phallales
- Family: Phallaceae
- Genus: Lysurus
- Species: L. arachnoideus

Binomial name
- Lysurus arachnoideus Bernard & Lotsy

= Lysurus arachnoideus =

Species of fungus

Lysurus arachnoideus or Star-headed Stinkhorn is a species of basidiomycete fungi in the genus Lysurus.
