= Lydia Rabinowitsch-Kempner =

American bacteriologist and physician (1871–1935)

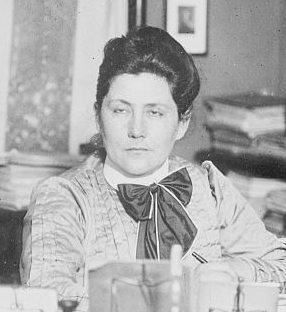
- Lydia Rabinowitsch-Kempner
- Born: Lydia Rabinowitsch; August 22, 1871; Kovno, Kovno Governorate, Russian Empire
- Died: August 3, 1935 (aged 63); Berlin, Nazi Germany
- Children: 3, including Robert Kempner

Lydia Rabinowitsch-Kempner (22 August 1871 – 3 August 1935) was a Jewish bacteriologist, suffragette, and physician, known for her research on the pathogenesis of tuberculosis. In 1904, she identified the bacterium tubercle bacilli in raw milk. Her work was crucial to the development of Freund adjuvant. In 1912, she became the first woman to be granted professorship in Berlin. Eventually, Rabinowitsch became the director of the Moabit Municipal Hospital.

== Biography ==
Lydia Rabinowitsch was born at Kovno, Russian Empire (now Kaunas, Lithuania). She was educated at the girls' gymnasium in Kovno, privately in Latin and Greek. Since she was a woman and Jewish, she was unable to get a higher education in Russia. Subsequently, she left to study the natural sciences at University of Zurich and obtained a doctorate at the University of Bern in 1894.

After graduation she went to Berlin, where Professor Robert Koch permitted her to pursue her bacteriological studies at the Robert Koch Institute for Infectious Diseases, becoming his only female apprentice, albeit unpaid.

In 1895, she went to Philadelphia, where she was appointed lecturer, and eventually, a professor at the Woman's Medical College of Pennsylvania. In April 1898, she returned to Berlin. She married bacteriologist Walter Kempner (1869-1920).

After the discovery a species, trypanosome lewisi, in 1877, she identified the different stages of the parasite.

In 1896, she delivered a lecture on the study of medicine by women in various countries before the International Congress of Women in Berlin. In 1902, she went to Odessa to study the plague. Subsequently, Rabinowitsch studied African trypanosomiasis in East Africa alongside Robert Koch.

In 1904, she uncovered the bacterium, Tubercle bacilli in raw milk, which her mentor, Koch had previously attempted but failed in the past. At the congress of scientists held at Breslau in 1904 she presided over the section for hygiene and bacteriology.

Once she returned to Berlin, Rabinowitsch received a position as a research assistant at the Pathology Institute at the Charité Hospital focusing on tuberculosis. From 1914, to 1933, she was the editor of Zeitschrift für Tuberkulose.

In 1912, she was granted professorship, the first woman to receive the title. In 1912, Kaiser Wilhelm honoured her, but this led to an anti-semitic backlash in the press and she was denied employment.

Dr. Rabinowitsch’s research focused around the transmission of Mycobacterium tuberculosis and Mycobacterium bovis by dairy products; her work led to the development of Freund adjuvant. She worked with Pasteur Institute authorities to solve the BCG vaccine crisis after accidental contamination in Lubock led to patients being infected with tuberculosis.

Eventually, Rabinowitsch became director at the Bacteriological Institute of Moabit Hospital, the second most important hospital in Berlin. In 1933, she was forced out due to the boycott of Jewish institutions after the rise of Nazism, which saw many Jewish doctors dismissed and forbidden to return.

== Personal life ==
Lydia, coming from a wealthy Jewish family, got a good school education, like all of her nine siblings. She moved to Switzerland for further studies at the age of 18, as quoted by her biographer, Graffmann-Weschke:

„Sie hat Pädagogik, Germanistik studiert unter anderem, aber auch Zoologie und Botanik, wo sie dann promoviert hat 1894 in Bern. Und das war offenbar für dieses neue Fach Bakteriologie das Entscheidende, sodass sie eine Chance hatte, bei Robert Koch in Berlin dann arbeiten zu dürfen.“

She worked with Dr. Walter Kempner (1869-1920, a physician and social hygienist) at the Robert Koch Institute (formerly called Royal Prussian Institute for Infectious Diseases), whom she later married in 1898 in Madrid.

They had three children. Their first son Robert Kempner (1899-1993) was a jurist who served at the Nuremberg trials. Their daughter, Nadja Kempner, died from tuberculosis in 1932 before she could complete her studies in Philogy. Their younger son, Dr Walter Kempner Jr. (1903-1997), a medical doctor, was known for his rice diet.

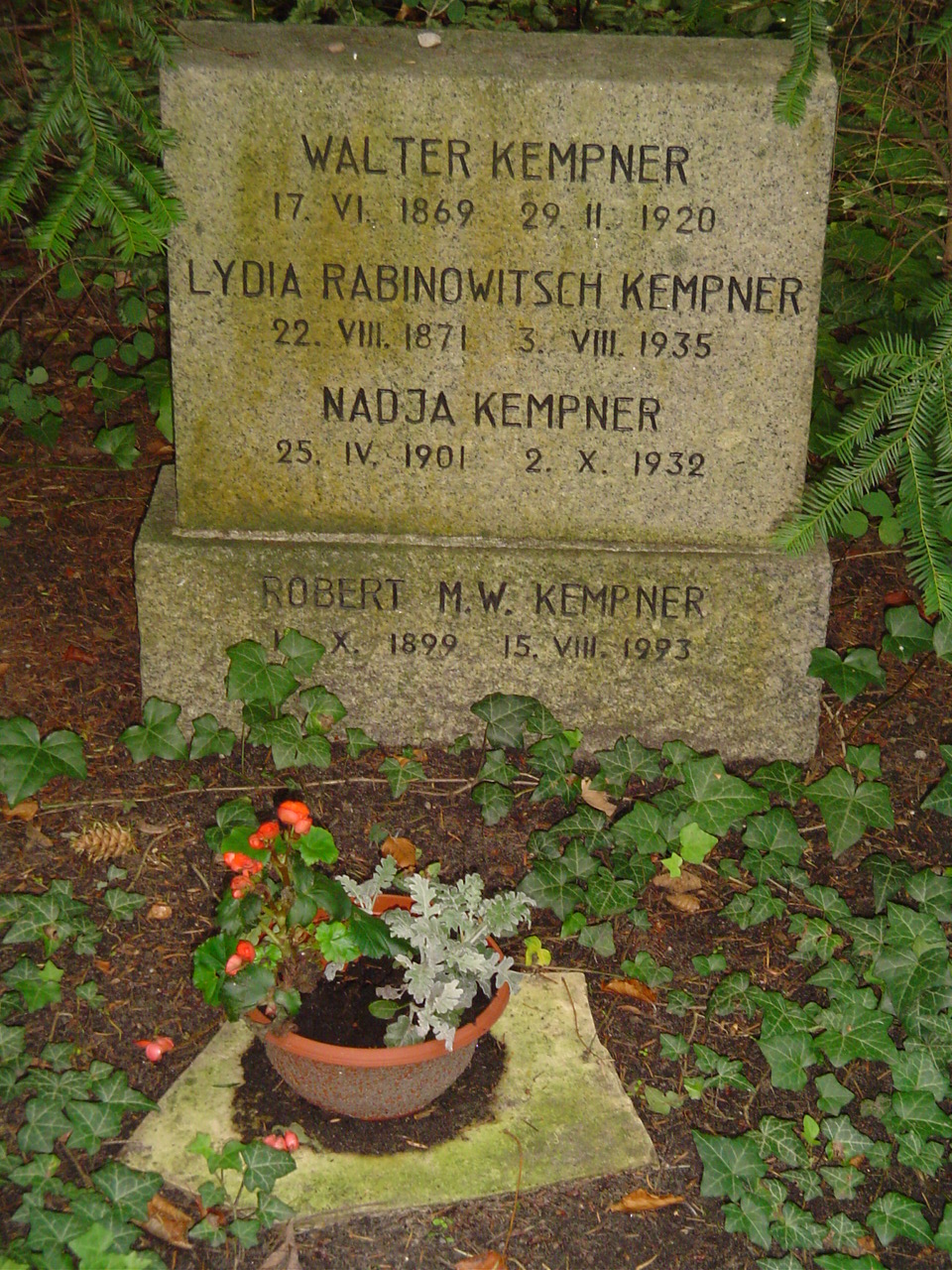
Headstone at the graves of Rabinowitsch-Kempner, her husband, daughter and son Robert, Parkfriedhof Lichterfelde, Berlin.

She later died on 3 August 1935, aged 64, from Breast Cancer and was buried in their family's grave in Berlin.

== Bibliography ==
- Anna Plothow. Der Weltspiegel, October 27, 1904
- Deutsche Hausfrauenzeitung, July 1897, by Isidore Singer & Regina Neisser
- Beiträge zur Entwickelungsgeschichte der Fruchtkörper einiger Gastromyceten, L Rabinowitsch, 1894

== Sources ==
- Renaud; Freney, Francois; Jean (2011). Pioneers of Bacteriology. Eska Publishing. p. 179
