= Aspergillus spinosus =

Scientific classification
- Kingdom: Fungi
- Division: Ascomycota
- Class: Eurotiomycetes
- Order: Eurotiales
- Family: Aspergillaceae
- Genus: Aspergillus
- Species: A. spinosus

Binomial name
- Aspergillus spinosus Kozakiewicz 1989

Type strain
- ATCC 16898, CBS 483.65, NRRL 5034

Synonyms
- Aspergillus fischeri var. spinosus, Aspergillus fischeri var. verrucosu, Neosartorya fischeri var. spinosa, Neosartorya spinosa

Species of fungus

Aspergillus spinosus is a species of fungus in the genus Aspergillus. Aspergillus spinosus produces aszonalenins, 2-pyrovoylaminobenzamide, fumigachlorin and pseurotins.

== Growth and morphology ==
A. spinosus has been cultivated on both Czapek yeast extract agar (CYA) plates and Malt Extract Agar Oxoid (MEAOX) plates. The growth morphology of the colonies can be seen in the pictures below.

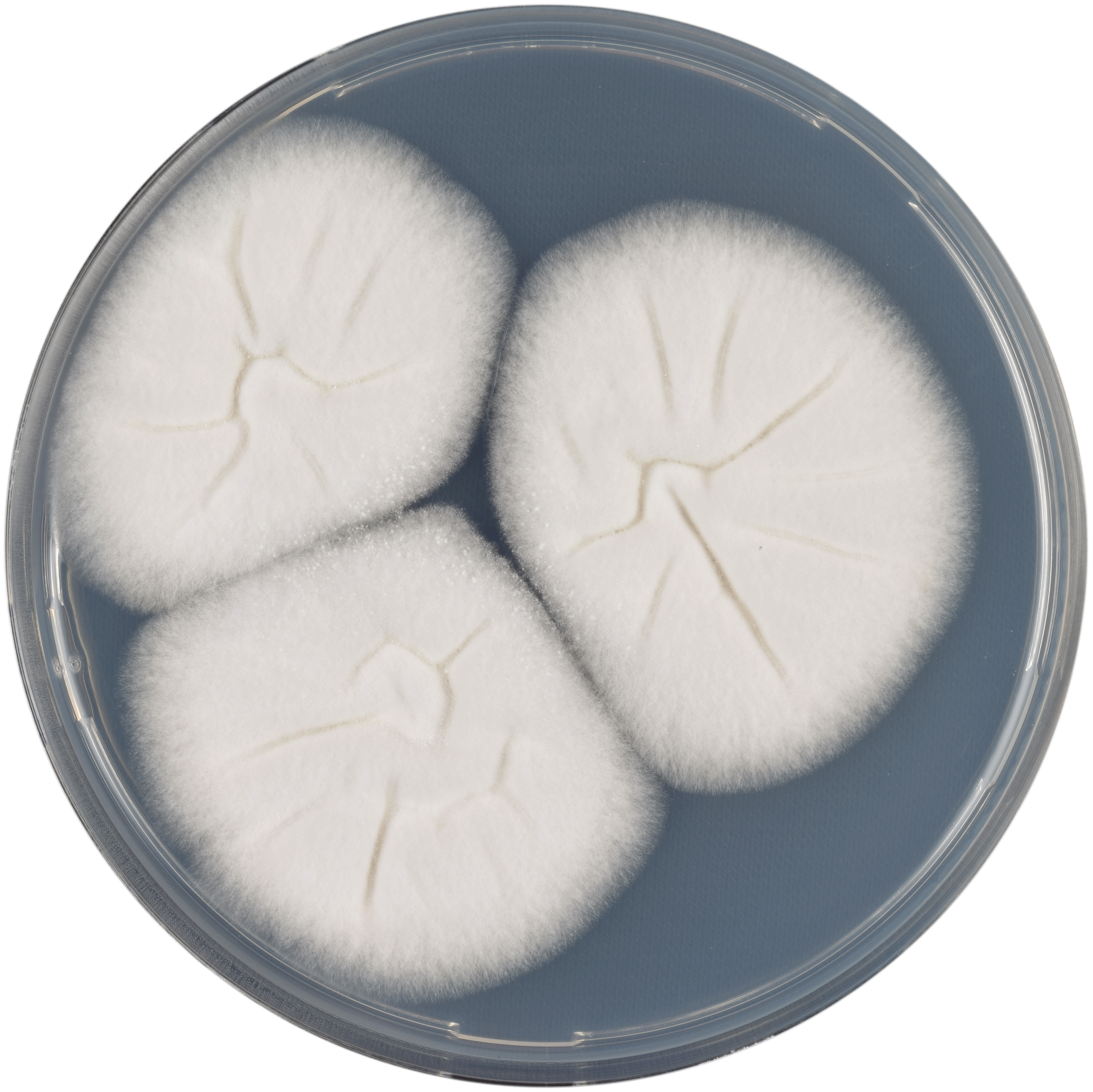
Aspergillus spinosus growing on CYA plate

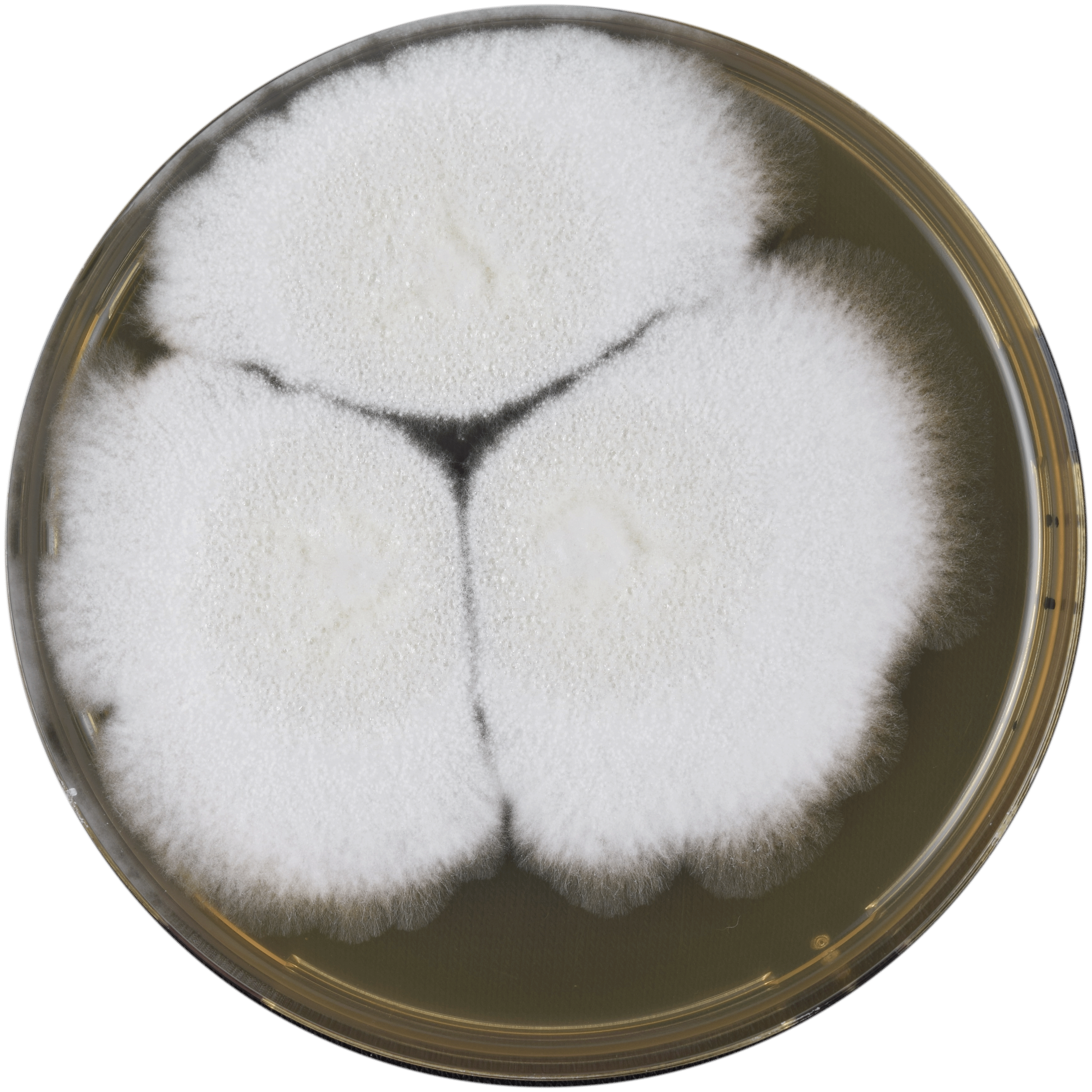
Aspergillus spinosus growing on MEAOX plate
