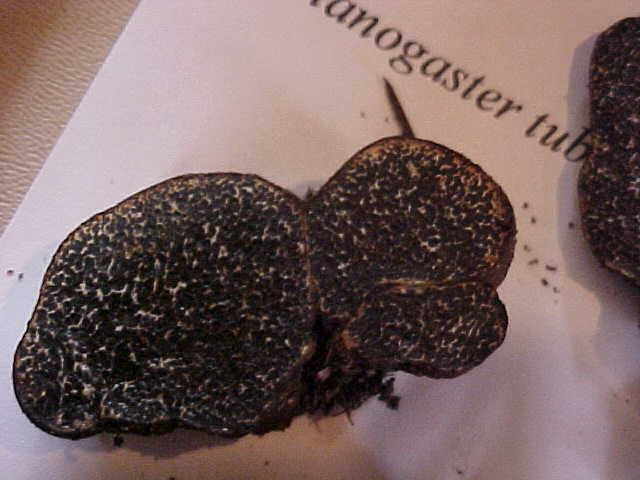
- The "false-truffle" mushroom species Melanogaster tuberiformis

Scientific classification
- Kingdom: Fungi
- Division: Basidiomycota
- Class: Agaricomycetes
- Order: Boletales
- Family: Melanogastraceae; E. Fisch. (1933)

Genera
- Alpova; Melanogaster

= Melanogastraceae =

Family of fungi

Melanogastraceae is a family of fungi in the order Boletales.
