= Pierre-Martial Cibot =

Pierre-Martial Cibot (born at Limoges, France, 14 August 1727; died at Beijing, China, 8 August 1780) was a French Jesuit missionary to China.

== Life ==
Cibot entered the Society of Jesus on 7 November 1743, and taught humanities with much success. He was sent to China at his own request 7 March 1758, and arrived at Macao on 25 July. He reached Beijing on 6 June 1760, joining the Jesuits who were retained at the court of the emperor. He remained in China for many years, and during that time conducted historical and scientific studies.

== Works ==
Cibot published many of his essays anonymously. The Catholic Encyclopedia describes his style as "somewhat diffuse", but praises the variety of information contained in his writings.

Many of his notes and observations on the history and literature of the Chinese were published in the Mémoires concernant l'histoire, les sciences les arts, les moeurs, les usages, etc., des Chinois: par les missionaires de Pékin (Paris, 1776–89, 16 vols.). These volumes were at the time the chief source of information in Europe regarding China and its people.

Cibot's most lengthy work, his Essai sur l'antiquité des Chinois, appeared in the first volume of the Mémoires. In it he claims Yao (2356 B.C.) as the founder of the Chinese Empire. This view was not held, however, by other contemporary writers: in the second volume of the Mémoires his colleague, Jean Joseph Marie Amiot, in his L'antiquité des Chinois prouvée par les monuments, defended the traditional Chinese chronology.

Cibot also instituted a comparison between the Jews and the Chinese in connection with a commentary on the Book of Esther (Mémoires, vols. XIV-XVI). He collected a herbarium and contributed a number of articles on various topics in natural science to the Mémoires, including:

- Notices de quelques plantes arbrisseaux de la Chine (vol. III)
- Observations sur les plantes, les fleurs, et les arbres de Chine qu'il est possible et utile de se procurer en France
- Notice sur le borax
- Mémoire sur les chevaux (vol. XI)
- Notice sur l'hirondelle, sur le cerf et sur la cigale (vol. XII)
