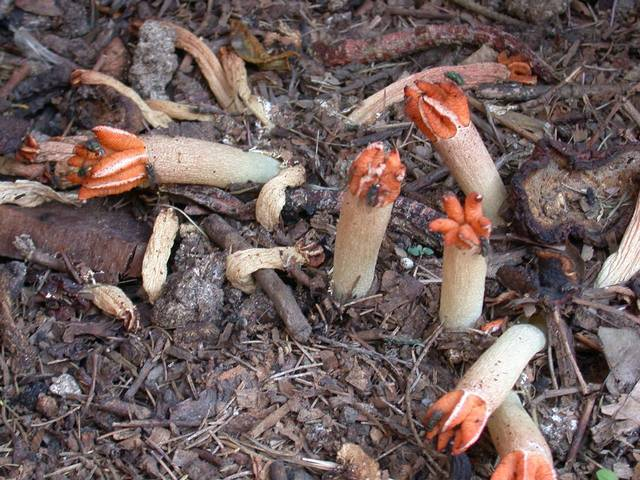

Scientific classification
- Kingdom: Fungi
- Division: Basidiomycota
- Class: Agaricomycetes
- Order: Phallales
- Family: Phallaceae
- Genus: Lysurus
- Species: L. cruciatus

Binomial name
- Lysurus cruciatus (Lepr. & Mont.) Henn. (1902)

Synonyms
- Aserophallus cruciatus Lepr. & Mont. (1845); Lysurus australiensis Cooke & Massee (1889); Anthurus australiensis (Cooke & Massee) E.Fisch. (1893); Anthurus cruciatus (Lepr. & Mont.) E.Fisch. (1900); Lysurus cruciatus var. nanus Calonge & B.Marcos (1991); Lysurus cruciatus var. nanus Calonge & B.Marcos (2000)

= Lysurus cruciatus =

Species of fungus

Lysurus cruciatus
- Mycological characteristics
- Glebal hymenium
- Hymenium attachment is irregular or not applicable
- Stipe has a volva
- Ecology is saprotrophic
- Edibility is not recommended

Lysurus cruciatus or the lizard's-claw stinkhorn is a species of fungus in the stinkhorn family. It was first described scientifically in 1845 by French botanists François Mathias René Leprieur and Camille Montagne as Aserophallus cruciatus. German mycologist Paul Christoph Hennings transferred it to the genus Lysurus in 1902. In 1901, the mushroom was rediscovered in Inanda, Natal. This "new" find was named L. woodii, which was later corrected to be the previously discovered L. cruciatus.

The fruit bodies feature a white, cylindrical tube supporting a cluster of hollow, reddish pointed arms whose surface is covered with foul-smelling spore mass, or gleba. The gleba is brownish to greenish in color, and contains spores with dimensions of 3–4 by 1.5–2 μm. The mature fruiting body is up to 12 centimetres (4 3/4 in) tall.

It may be edible in the 'egg' stage, but David Arora cautions they may feature the same drawback as Clathrus archeri, in which the eggs are contained in a mucilaginous spore layer that leaves a lasting bad aftertaste.
