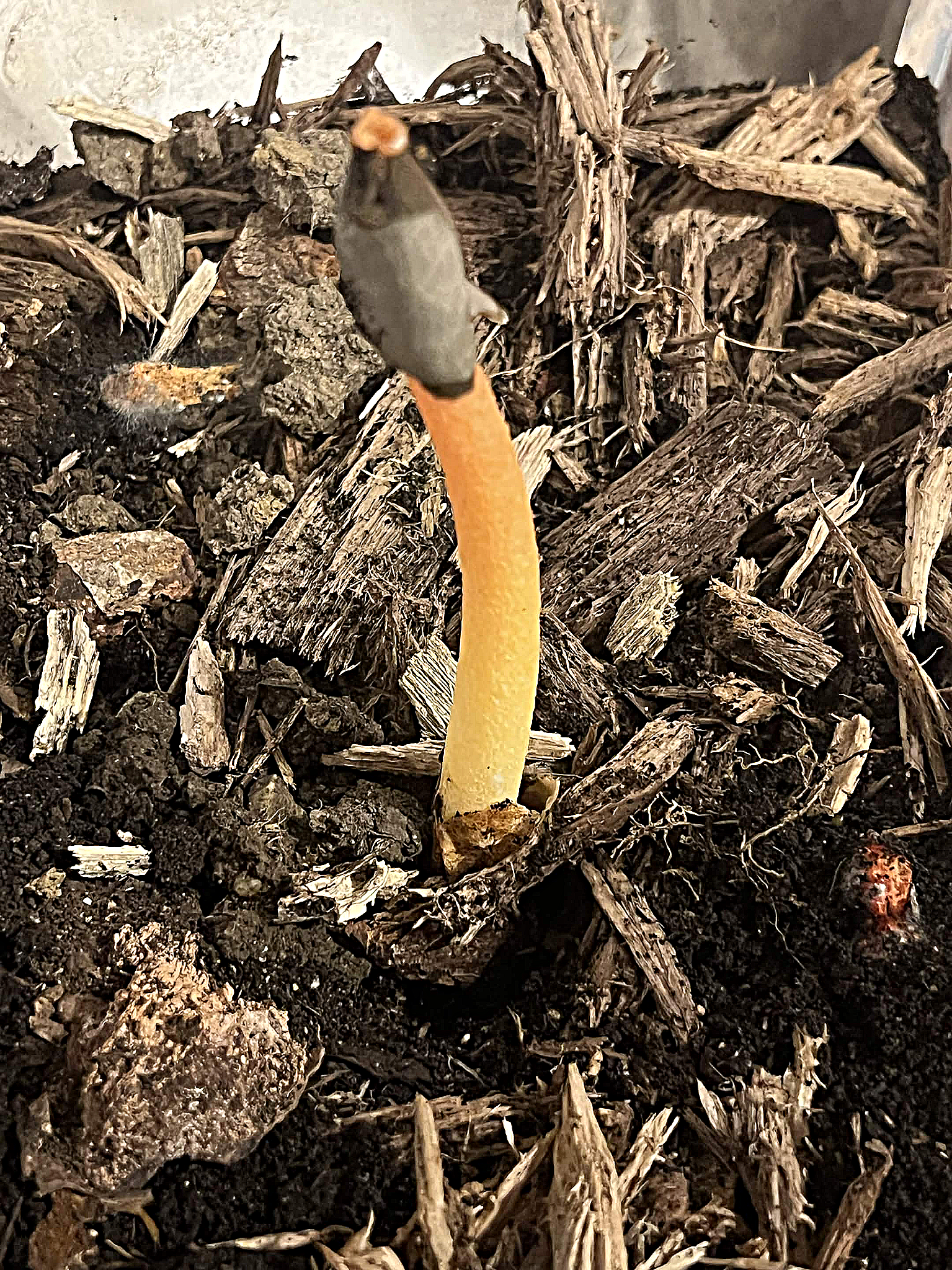

Scientific classification
- Kingdom: Fungi
- Division: Basidiomycota
- Class: Agaricomycetes
- Order: Phallales
- Family: Phallaceae
- Genus: Satyrus
- Species: S. rugulosus

Binomial name
- Satyrus rugulosus (E. Fisch.) Kun L. Yang, Jia Y. Lin & Zhu L. Yang

Synonyms
- Phallus rugulosus

= Satyrus rugulosus =

Satyrus rugulosus
- Mycological characteristics
- Glebal hymenium
- Cap is conical
- Hymenium attachment is not applicable
- Stipe is bare
- Ecology is saprotrophic
- Edibility is inedible

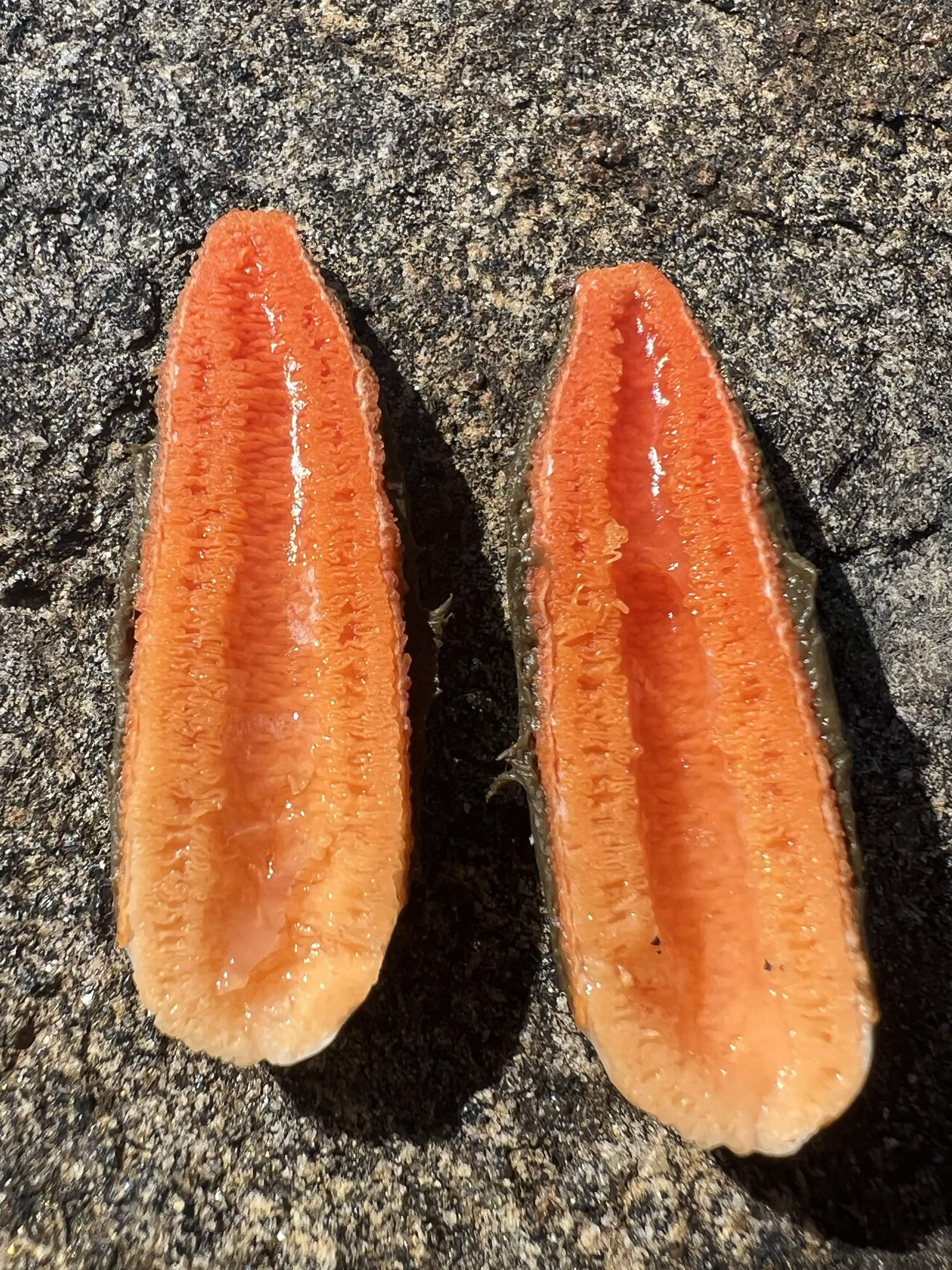
Bisected S. rugulosus egg structure when it was about to erupt

Satyrus rugulosus, the wrinkly stinkhorn, is a fungus in the family Phallaceae. It is mostly concentrated in Eastern North America. It can also be found in East Asia, Western Europe, Southern Africa and parts of Oceania. Like most stinkhorns they are noted for their foul odor which can be described like seafood. S. rugulosus is commonly found growing in dense clusters or fruiting bodies with others close by. They are commonly found growing in mulch that has been sitting for a long time.

== Identification ==
Satyrus rugulosus is very easy to confuse with Satyrus rubicundus which is a related stinkhorn but S. rubicundus is more prominent in states south of Virginia and S. rugulosus is more common in states north of Virginia though both species can be found around the line. S. rubicundus can be identified by its redder color though S. rugulosus can appear redder when dried. S. rubicundus also usually tapers less and appears more swollen towards the middle while S. rugulosus stipes take a more fang/spike-like appearance. S. rubicundus also appears to have smaller and more numerous depressions on its stipe giving it a more sponge-like texture.

Satyrus rugulosus can also be confused with stinkhorns in the genus Mutinus such as Mutinus caninus, Mutinus ravenelii and Mutinus elegans. But they are easily distinguishable as S. rugulosus features a distinct cap where the gleba covers. M. elegans, M. caninus and other species of Mutinus do not actually appear to have anything that qualifies as a cap, and the gleba will instead be found covering an area of the stem close to the top.
