= Mutinus bambusinus =

Scientific classification
- Kingdom: Fungi
- Division: Basidiomycota
- Class: Agaricomycetes
- Order: Phallales
- Family: Phallaceae
- Genus: Mutinus
- Species: M. bambusinus

Binomial name
- Mutinus bambusinus (Zoll.) E. Fisch

Species of fungus

Mutinus bambusinus, the bamboo dipstick, is a fungus in the family phallaceae. It is found in the tropics most commonly in Asia where it grows in decaying wood, bamboo groves and such. Similar to other stinkhorns in the genus Mutinus, M. bambusinus appears not to feature a distinct cap. Instead, the gleba can be found covering parts of the upper stipe.

== Description ==
Mutinus bambusinus is a saprobe, it gets its nutrients by decaying matter, most commonly decaying wood.

The fruiting bodies appear as a red-white stalk that tapers evenly to the tip similar to Mutinus elegans. Likewise, Mutinus ravenelii is less 'pointy' compared to M. elegans and M. bambusinus. It generally reaches (6-10 cm) tall and is usually covered in gleba in newly erupted ones. Flies and other insects will become attracted to the smell and feed on the gleba, inadvertently becoming covered in spores and carrying them away.

== Range ==
It is typically found in the tropics of Asia but there are reports in the Caribbean, American tropics and rarely in Africa.
