= Destuntzia rubra =

Conservation status
- Critically Endangered (IUCN 3.1)

- Imperiled (NatureServe)

Scientific classification
- Kingdom: Fungi
- Division: Basidiomycota
- Class: Agaricomycetes
- Order: Phallales
- Family: Claustulaceae
- Genus: Destuntzia
- Species: D. rubra

Binomial name
- Destuntzia rubra (Harkn.) Fogel & Trappe (1985)

Synonyms
- Hymenogaster ruber Harkn. (1899)

Species of fungus

Destuntzia rubra is a species of truffle-like fungus in the family Claustulaceae, and the type species of the genus Destuntzia. The fungus was first described scientifically in 1899 by H. W. Harkness as Hymenogaster ruber. Robert Fogel and James Trappe transferred it to Destuntzia in 1985.

The fruiting body is up to 4 centimetres (1 1/2 in) broad. It is white when young and stains reddish in age. It grows in woods, often with Douglas-fir.
