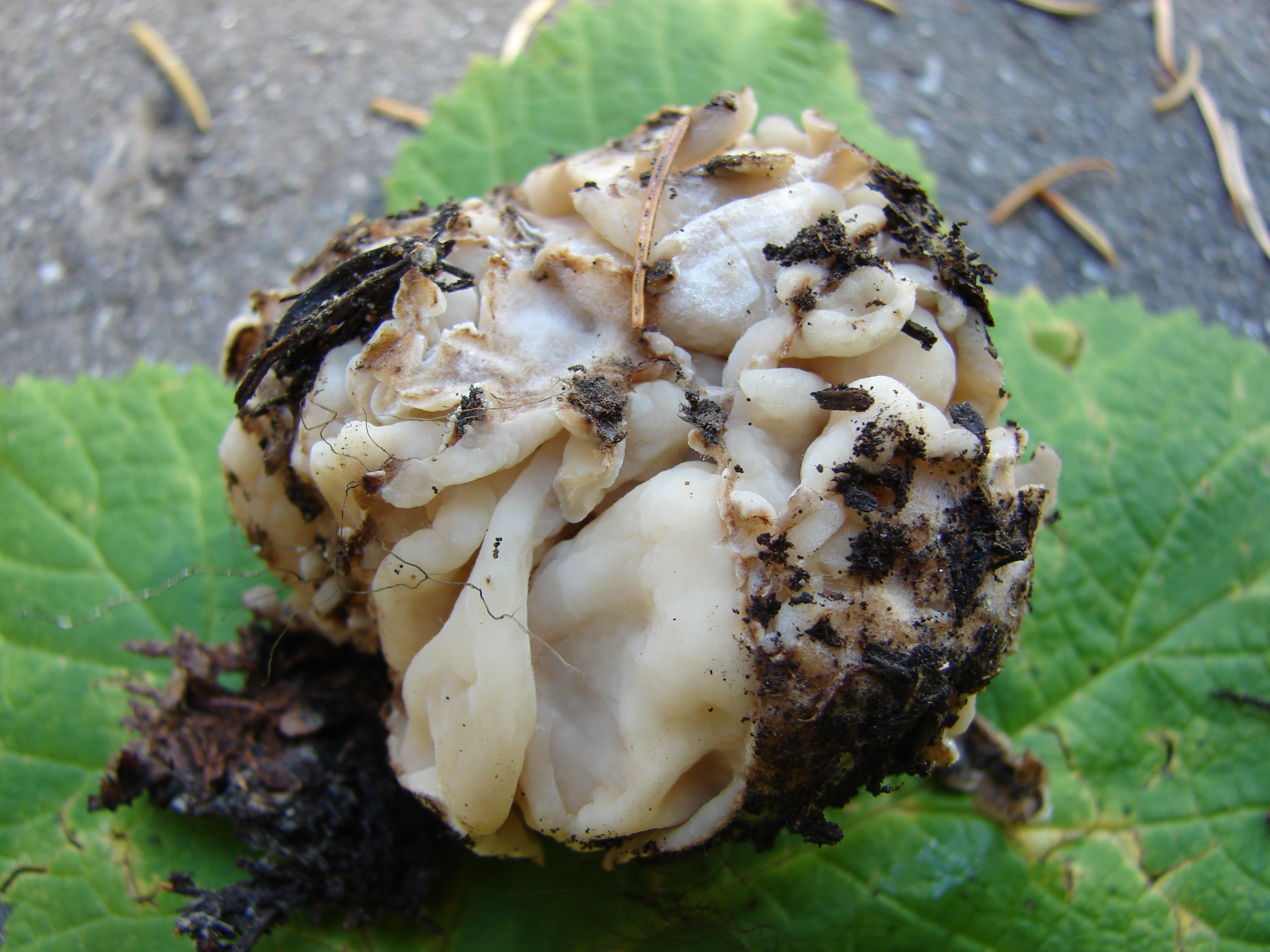

Scientific classification
- Kingdom: Fungi
- Division: Ascomycota
- Class: Pezizomycetes
- Order: Pezizales
- Family: Pyronemataceae
- Genus: Geopora
- Species: G. cooperi

Binomial name
- Geopora cooperi Harkn. (1885)

= Geopora cooperi =

Species of fungus

Geopora cooperi
- Mycological characteristics
- Glebal hymenium
- Hymenium attachment is irregular or not applicable
- Lacks a stipe
- Ecology is mycorrhizal
- Edibility is edible

Geopora cooperi, commonly known as the pine truffle or the fuzzy truffle, is a species of fungus in the family Pyronemataceae. It has a fuzzy brown outer surface and an inner surface of whitish, convoluted folds of tissue. Widely distributed in the Northern Hemisphere, the species has been recorded from Eurasia and North America.

== Taxonomy ==
First described by American mycologist Harvey Willson Harkness in 1885, the fungus is named for the original collector, J. D. Cooper. It is commonly known as the "pine truffle" or the "fuzzy truffle".

== Description ==
The roughly spherical fruit bodies grow underground. Ranging from 2 to 8 cm (3/4 to 3 1/8 in) in diameter, they are yellow-brown to darker brown with a fuzzy, furrowed external surface. The inside of the fruit body, the whitish gleba, comprises deeply folded and convoluted tissue with some internal open spaces between them. Young pine truffles ooze a whitish juice when they are cut. The odor of the internal flesh is usually mild, but David Arora has noted the existence of a form in the Western United States that smells similar to fermented cider.

The smooth, elliptical or roughly spherical spores measure 18–27 by 13–21 μm and have an oil droplet. The asci (spore-bearing cells) are typically eight-spored. They are arranged as a palisade of cells forming a hymenium that covers the inner surfaces of the internal folds.

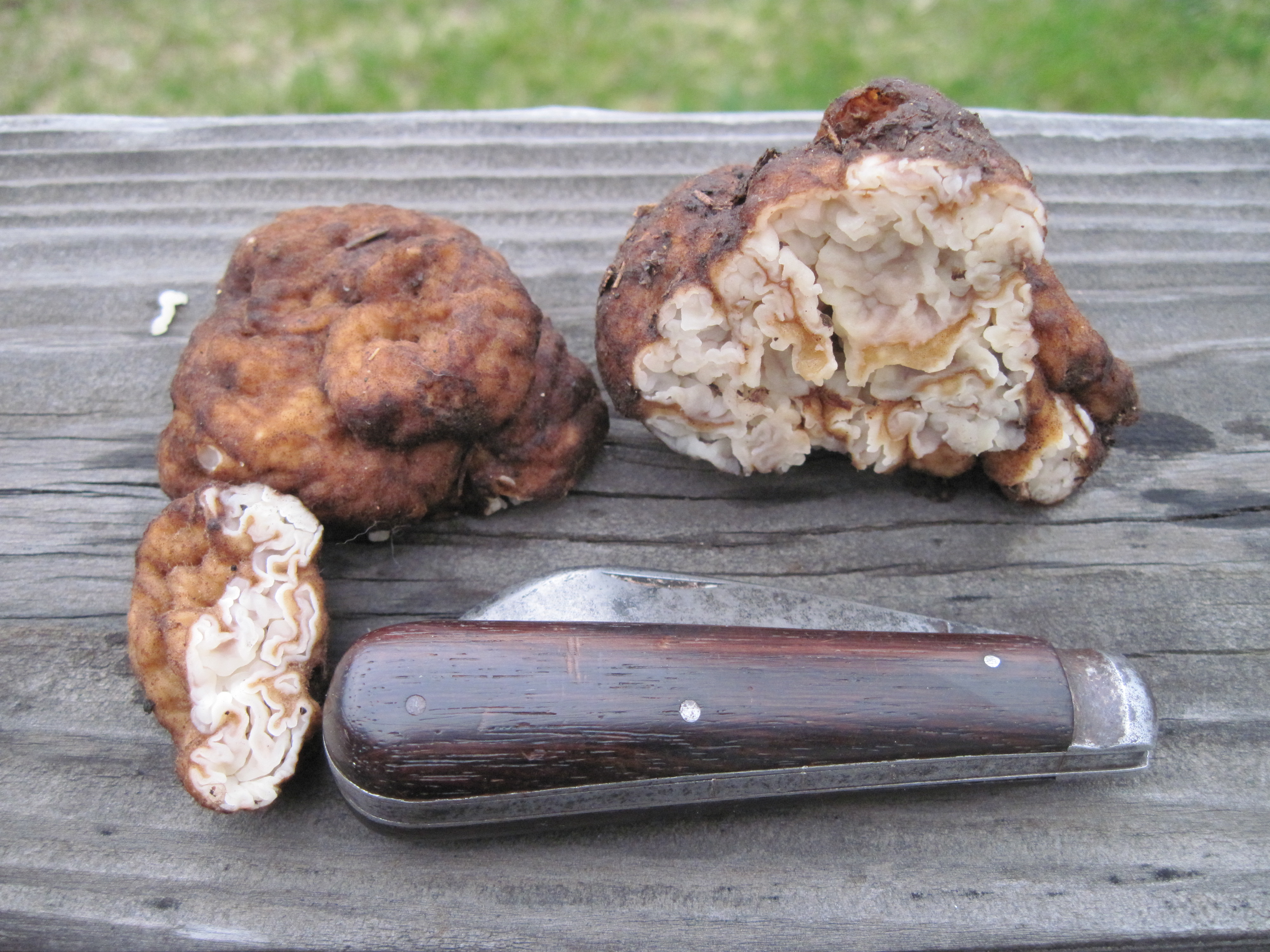
The outer surface is brown and felt-like.

== Habitat and distribution ==
Fruit bodies grow singly or in groups under the soil surface near conifer and Eucalyptus trees. In the field, they can sometimes be detected by the mound of soil they push up as they grow. In western North America, it is found from Mexico to as far north as Alaska. Specimens from the latter location have been found under aspen and willow trees. Geopora cooperi is a snowbank mushroom, as it commonly occurs after snow has melted. The fungus has also been recorded in China, western Asia (Turkey), Pakistan, and Europe. In Turkey, it is considered critically endangered.

== Uses ==
Geopora cooperi fruit bodies are edible and considered good by some.
