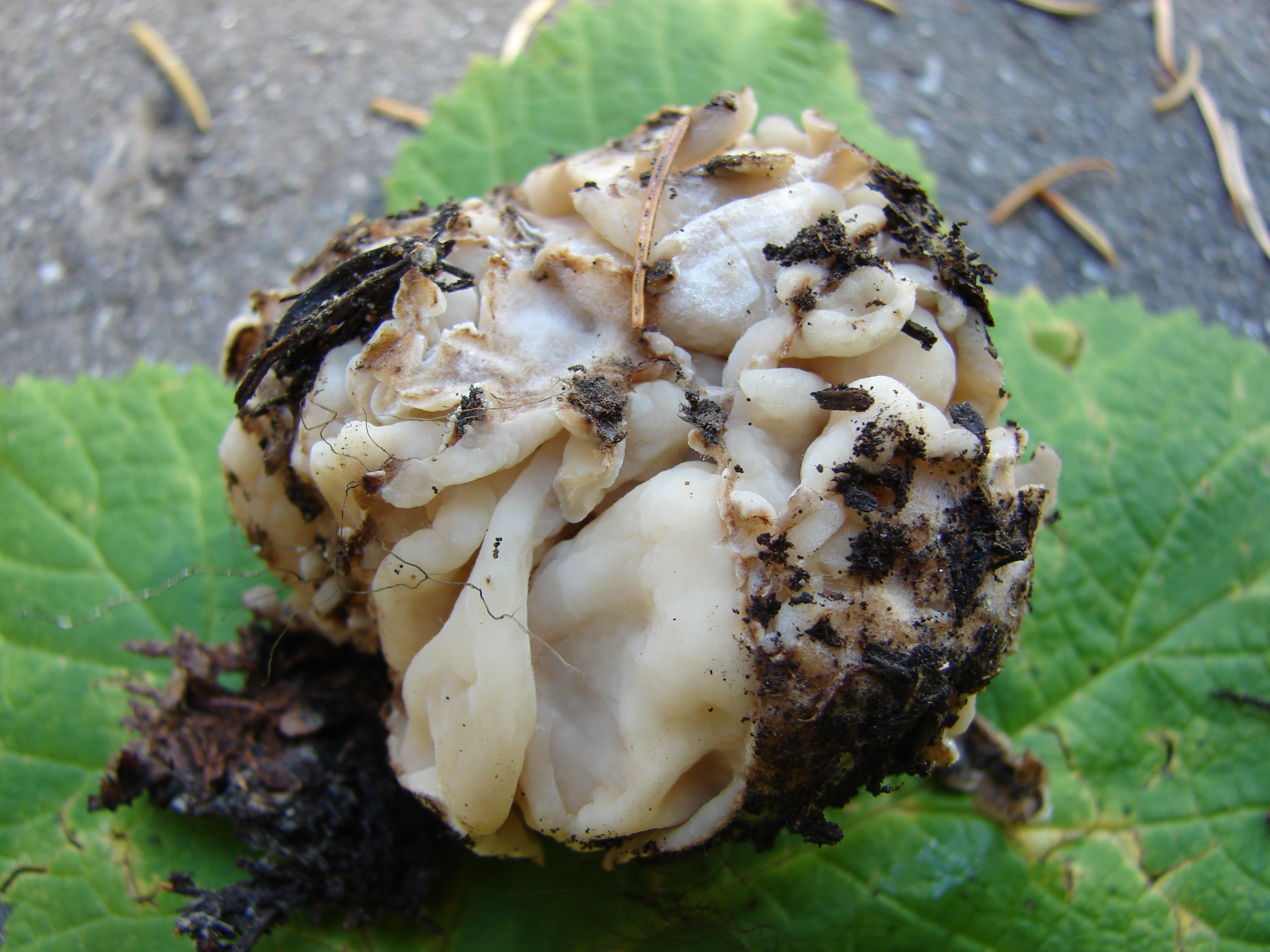
- Geopora cooperi

Scientific classification
- Domain: Eukaryota
- Kingdom: Fungi
- Division: Ascomycota
- Class: Pezizomycetes
- Order: Pezizales
- Family: Pyronemataceae
- Genus: Geopora; Harkn. (1885)

Type species
- Geopora cooperi Harkn. (1885)

Synonyms
- Peziza subgen. Sepultaria Cooke (1879); Sepultaria (Cooke) Boud. (1885); Pseudohydnotrya E.Fisch. (1897)

= Geopora =

Genus of fungi

Geopora is a genus of truffle-like fungi in the family Pyronemataceae, currently with 13 described species. The genus was circumscribed by mycologist Harvey Willson Harkness in 1885. Molecular phylogenetic reconstructions indicate that the cup-like apothecial Geopora should better be placed back in a separate genus, Sepultaria. Geopora would then only comprise Geopora cooperi and its close relatives.

== Species ==
Species include:

- Geopora arenicola
- Geopora arenosa
- Geopora cercocarpi
- Geopora cervina
- Geopora cooperi
- Geopora foliacea
- Geopora sepulta
- Geopora sumneriana
- Geopora tenuis
