= Destuntzia =

Scientific classification
- Kingdom: Fungi
- Division: Basidiomycota
- Class: Agaricomycetes
- Order: Phallales
- Family: Claustulaceae
- Genus: Destuntzia; Fogel & Trappe (1985)

Type species
- Destuntzia rubra (Harkn.) Fogel & Trappe (1985)

Species
- D. purpurea D. rubra D. saylorii

Genus of fungi

Destuntzia is a genus of truffle-like fungi in the family Claustulaceae. The genus contains three species found in North America. It is named after late American mycologist Daniel Elliot Stuntz.
