= Gelopellis =

Scientific classification
- Kingdom: Fungi
- Division: Basidiomycota
- Class: Agaricomycetes
- Order: Phallales
- Family: Claustulaceae
- Genus: Gelopellis; Zeller (1939)

Type species
- Gelopellis macrospora Zeller (1939)

Species
- G. macrospora G. purpurascens G. rufus G. shanxiensis G. thaxteri G. tholiformis

Genus of fungi

Gelopellis is a genus of fungi in the family Claustulaceae. The species in this relatively rare genus have fruit bodies that resemble the unopened egg of the stinkhorn Mutinus, with the columnella (sterile tissue extending up into or through the gleba) occupying the place where the compressed receptacle would be in the latter genus. The genus contains six species found in South America, Japan, and Australia.
