= Kjeldsenia =

Scientific classification
- Kingdom: Fungi
- Division: Basidiomycota
- Class: Agaricomycetes
- Order: Phallales
- Family: Claustulaceae
- Genus: Kjeldsenia; Colgan, Castellano & Bougher (1995)

Type species
- Kjeldsenia aureispora W.Colgan, Castellano & Bougher (1995)

Species
- K. aureispora K. fusca K. solstitialis K. subborealis

Genus of fungi

Kjeldsenia is a fungal genus in the family Claustulaceae of truffle-like species. It was first described in 1995 and in Mendocino County, California. The genus name honors C.K. Kjeldsen, professor of botany at Sonoma State University, while the specific epithet for the type species aureispora refers to the color of the spores when they are viewed in transmitted light.

Kjeldsenia was previously believed to contain only K. aureispora, but an additional three species were added in 2023 due to a revision of the genus Destuntzia's taxonomy.
