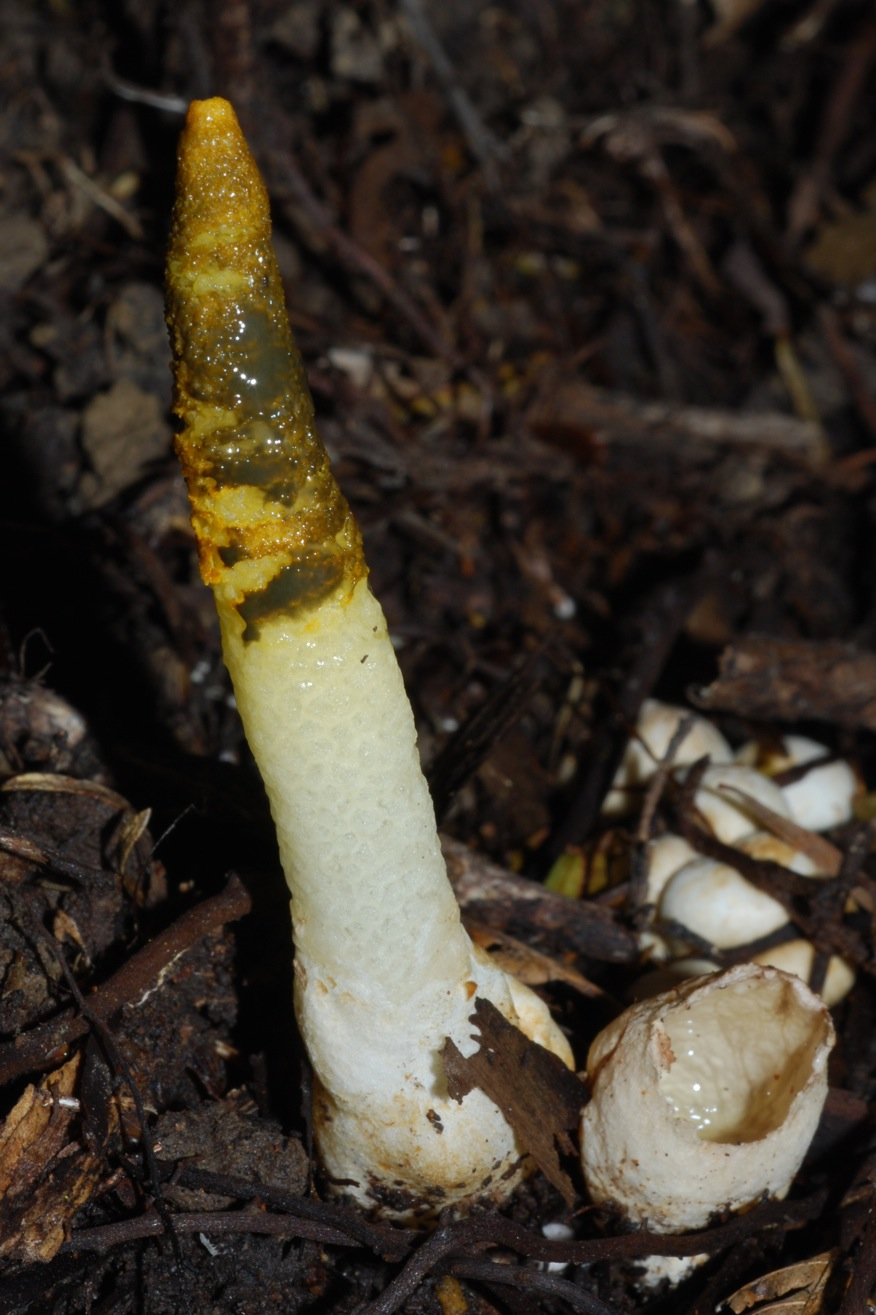

Scientific classification
- Kingdom: Fungi
- Division: Basidiomycota
- Class: Agaricomycetes
- Order: Phallales
- Family: Phallaceae
- Genus: Mutinus
- Species: M. borneensis

Binomial name
- Mutinus borneensis Ces.

Synonyms
- Aedycia borneensis (Ces.) Kuntze

= Mutinus borneensis =

Species of fungus

Mutinus borneensis
- Mycological characteristics
- Smooth hymenium
- Hymenium attachment is not applicable
- Stipe has a volva
- Spore print is blackish-brown to brown
- Ecology is saprotrophic
- Edibility is unknown

Mutinus borneensis is a species of fungus in the Phallaceae, or stinkhorn family. It was originally described in 1879 by Italian botanist Vincenzo de Cesati. The species has been collected from Borneo, China, and Australia.
