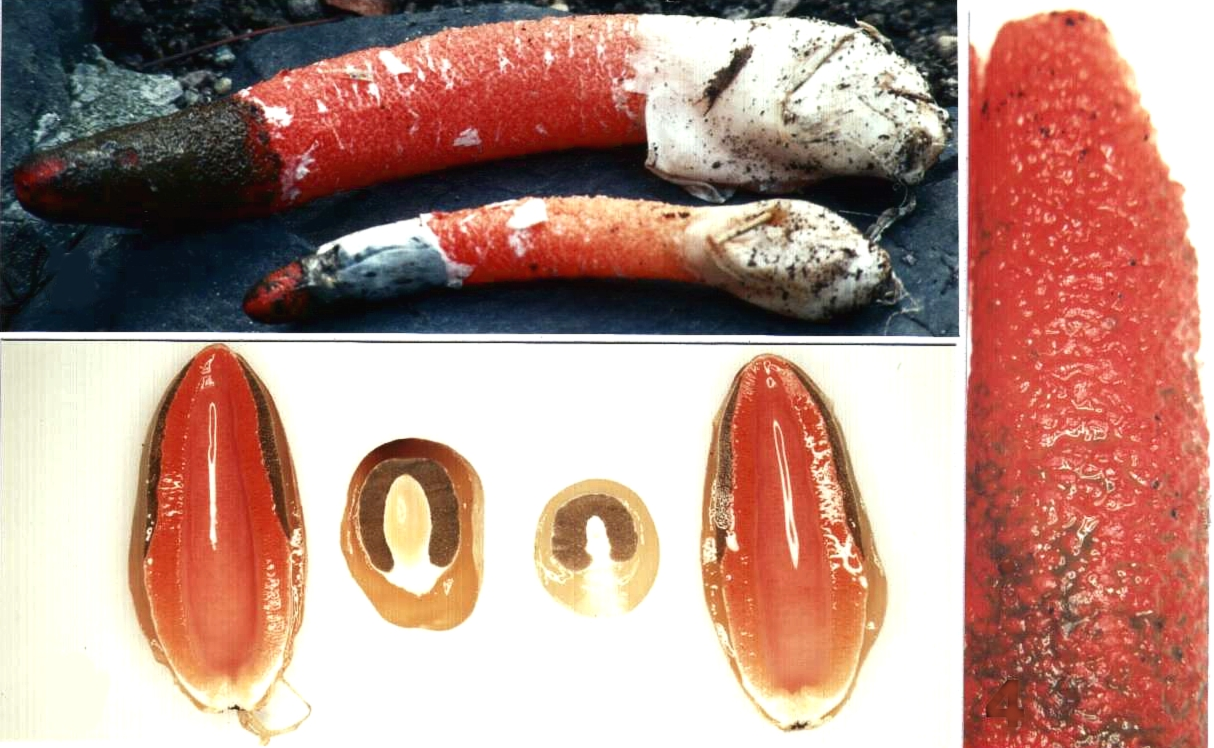

Scientific classification
- Kingdom: Fungi
- Division: Basidiomycota
- Class: Agaricomycetes
- Order: Phallales
- Family: Phallaceae
- Genus: Mutinus
- Species: M. elegans

Binomial name
- Mutinus elegans (Mont.) E.Fisch. (1888)

Synonyms
- Caromyxa elegans Mont. (1856); Caryomyxa elegans Mont. (1856); Corynites elegans Mont. (1856)

= Mutinus elegans =

Species of stinkhorn fungus

Mutinus elegans
- Mycological characteristics
- Glebal hymenium
- No distinct cap
- Stipe is bare
- Spore print is olive
- Ecology is saprotrophic
- Edibility is not recommended

Mutinus elegans, commonly known as the elegant stinkhorn, the headless stinkhorn, or the devil's dipstick, is a species of fungus in the Phallaceae (stinkhorn) family. It is also known as dog stinkhorn but using this name can lead to confusion with Mutinus caninus. The fruit body begins its development in an "egg" form, resembling somewhat a puffball partially submerged in the ground. As the fungus matures, a slender orange to pink colored stalk emerges that tapers evenly to a pointed tip. The stalk is covered with a foul-smelling slimy green spore mass on the upper third of its length. Flies and other insects feed upon the slime which contains the spores, assisting in their dispersal.

A saprobic species, it is typically found growing on the ground singly or in small groups on woody debris or leaf litter, during summer and autumn in Japan, Europe, and eastern North America. Due to their repellent odor, mature specimens are not generally considered edible, although there are reports of the immature "eggs" being consumed. In the laboratory, Mutinus elegans has been shown to inhibit the growth of several microorganisms that can be pathogenic to humans.

== Taxonomy ==
Mutinus elegans was first described by British missionary John Banister in 1679 who chronicled the natural history of Virginia; this early report is thought to be the first account of a fungus in North America. It was first characterized scientifically by French scientist Jean Pierre François Camille Montagne in 1856, who called it Corynites elegans.

The genus name Mutinus refers to the Roman phallic deity Mutunus Tutunus, one of the di indigetes placated by Roman brides. The species is commonly known variously as the "elegant stinkhorn", the "headless stinkhorn", the "dog stinkhorn", or the "devil's dipstick". The specific epithet elegans is derived from the Latin word meaning "graceful" or "elegant".

== Description ==
The young fruiting bodies are initially white and spherical or egg-shaped, partially submerged in the ground, with dimensions of 2 to 3 cm (3/4 to 1 1/4 in) by 1 to 2 cm (1/2 to 3/4 in). As the fruit body matures, the egg ruptures and the spongy spore-bearing stalk emerges; fully grown, it may be from 1 to 15 cm (1/2 to 6 in) long and 1.5 to 2 cm (1/2 to 3/4 in) thick. The stalk is hollow and strongly wrinkled overall; its shape is cylindrical below, but it gradually tapers to a narrow apex with a small opening at the tip. The upper half of the stalk is bright red to reddish orange, and the color gradually loses intensity transforming into pinkish white below. The stalk may be straight, or slightly curved. A gelatinous greenish-brown gleba covers the upper third of the stalk in newly emerged specimens. The remains of the "egg" forms a volva around the base of the stalk. The odor of the gleba is foul; one author describes it as "sickly sweet or metallic". It can also be described as the smell of old garbage, spoiled meat and a tone of lavender. The spores are a greenish-brown color. Fruit bodies are attached to the substrate by whitish rhizomorphs that resemble plant roots. American mycologist Alexander H. Smith noted that the eggs are often slow to open, sometimes taking up to two weeks before the stalk expands.

The spores are 4–7 by 2–3 μm, oblong-elliptical, smooth, and embedded in the gleba. A 1982 study revealed that spores of species in the family Phallaceae, including Mutinus elegans, have a hilar scar (0.2–0.3 μm diameter) that is observable with scanning electron microscopy. The hilar scar is a circular indentation at one end of the spore, and it most likely results during the separation of the attachment of the spore to the sterigma of the basidium.

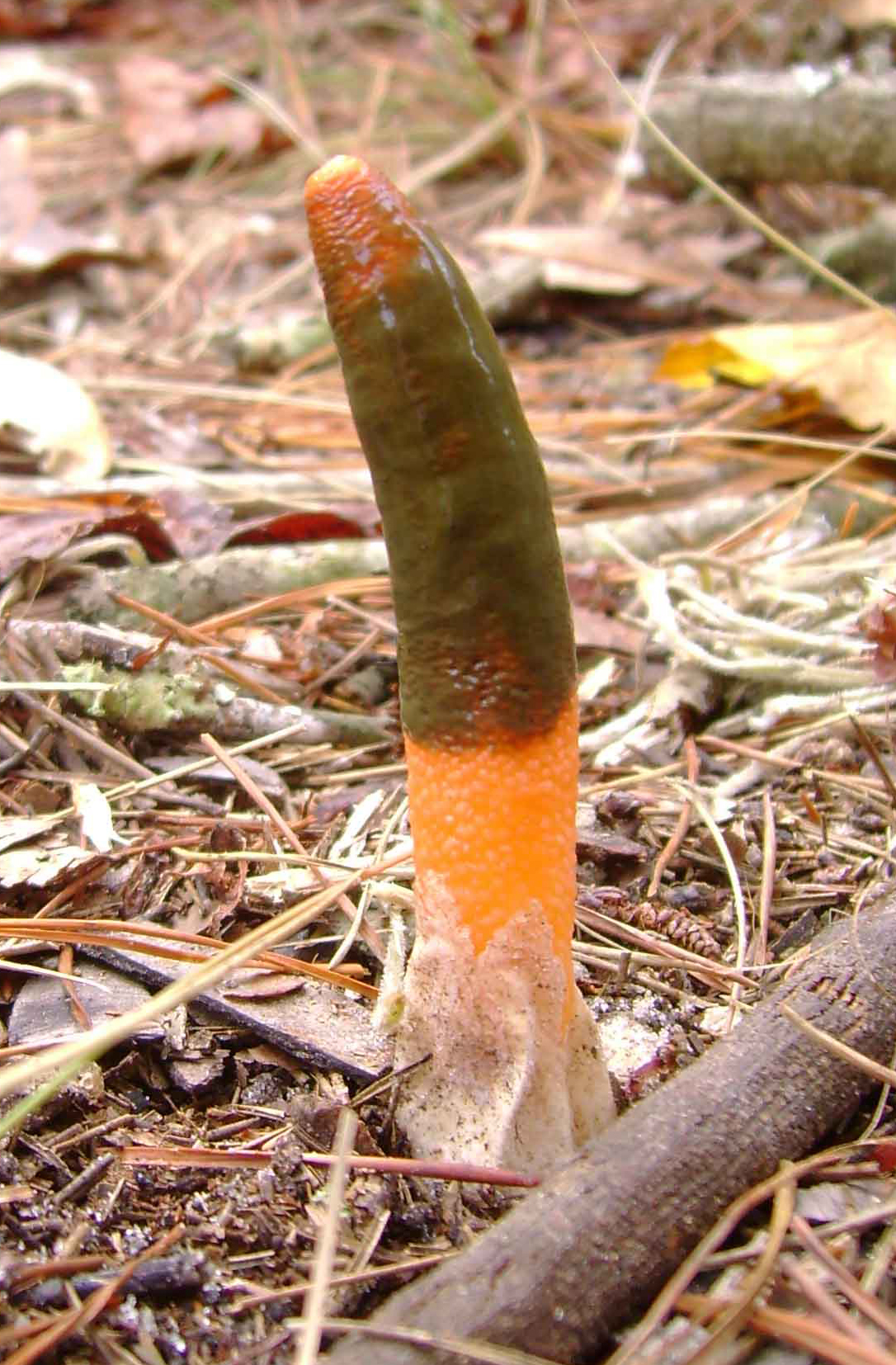
Specimen from Florida, US

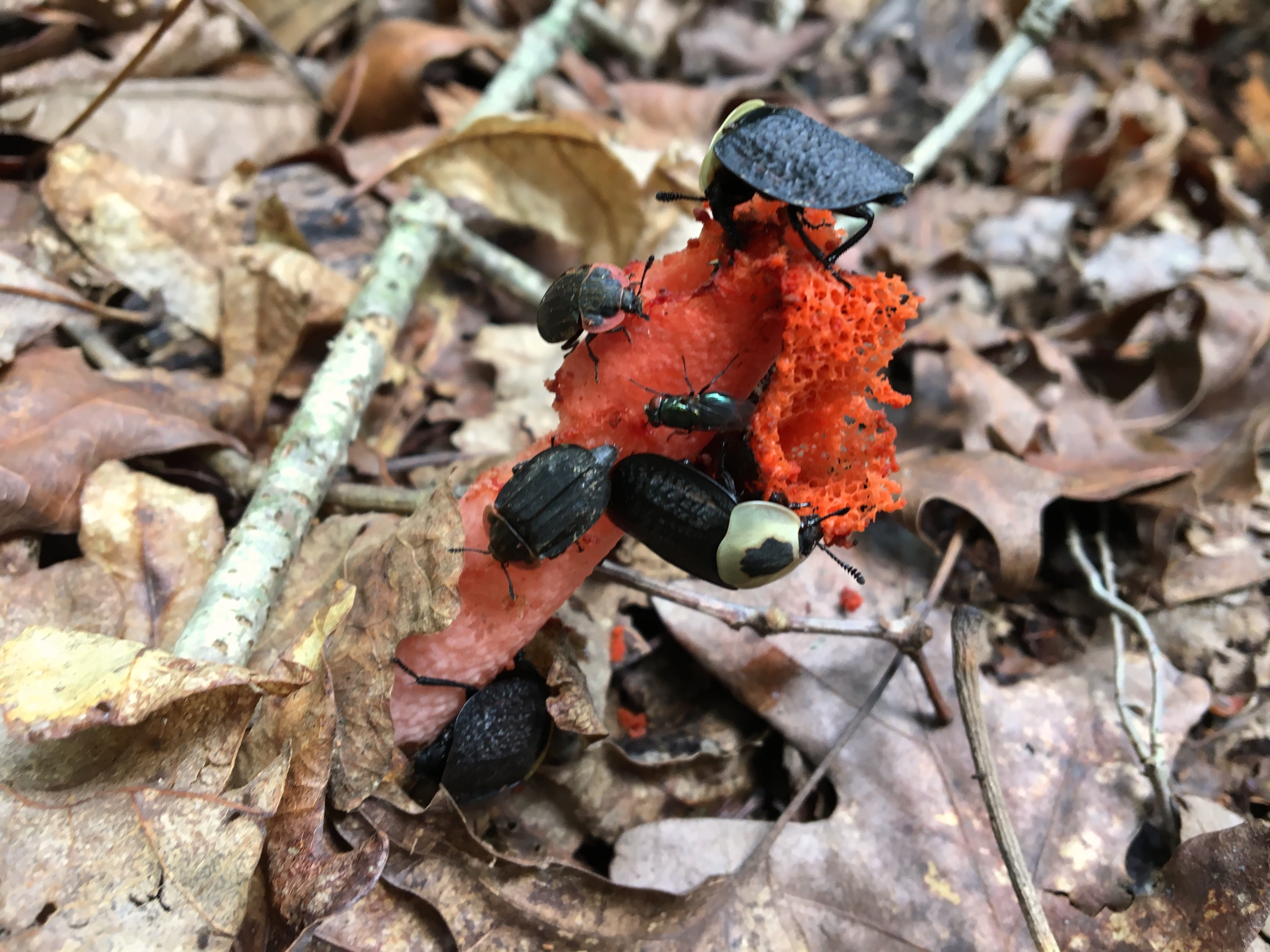
Beetles feeding on a specimen in Virginia

M. caninus, which has less of the stalk covered with gleba

=== Similar species ===
The "dog stinkhorn" (Mutinus caninus) is less common, smaller, has a distinct oval or spindle-shaped tip on a slender stem and lacks the bright coloring of M. elegans; it has less of the stalk covered by gleba. It is primarily found in Europe. The portion of the stalk below the spore mass is pitted in M. caninus, compared to "pebbly" in M. elegans. Mutinus bambusinus is similar in size and shape, except it does not have a distinct color demarcation between the upper and lower parts of the stalk; instead, the entire stem shows red pigments. The stalk of M. ravenelii is generally less tapered than M. elegans, and it has a clearly differentiated swollen head.

The normally pinkish Satyrus rubicundus and the orangish Satyrus rugulosus both have conical caps.

== Habitat and distribution ==
Mutinus elegans is saprobic—deriving nutrients by breaking down dead or dying organic matter. It is commonly found in gardens and farm areas enriched with manure, near well-decayed stumps and logs, and in wood chips. A Japanese publication mentioned its occurrence in Takatsuki and Osaka-fu, where it fruited in November and December on the ground along paths or in open spaces, under or near bamboo (Phyllostachys bambusoides) and hardwoods such as the sawtooth oak, the Japanese Zelkova, and the Camphor tree.

This common species has been collected in eastern North America, in the area extending from Quebec to Florida and west to the Great Lakes, Iowa, Colorado, and Texas. In Europe, it has been reported from Netherlands and in Asia, it has been collected in Japan.

== Uses ==
The immature egg-forms of M. elegans are edible, but "not recommended". One field guides notes that the eggs of the stinkhorn fungi "taste like the seasonings that are added to them." The fetid odor of mature specimens would probably be repellent to most, although they are not considered poisonous.

=== Antibiotic activity ===
A study of 32 basidiomycete mushrooms showed that Mutinus elegans was the only species to show antibiotic (both antibacterial and antifungal) activity against all six microorganisms tested, namely, the human pathogenic bacterias Bacillus cereus, Bacillus subtilis, Staphylococcus aureus, Escherichia coli, Salmonella typhimurium and the yeast Candida albicans.
