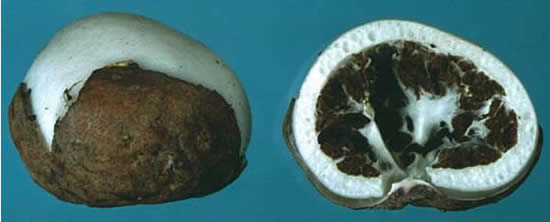

Conservation status
- Endangered (IUCN 3.1)

Scientific classification
- Kingdom: Fungi
- Division: Basidiomycota
- Class: Agaricomycetes
- Order: Phallales
- Family: Claustulaceae
- Genus: Claustula; K.M.Curtis (1926)
- Species: C. fischeri

Binomial name
- Claustula fischeri K.M.Curtis (1926)

= Claustula =

Genus of fungi

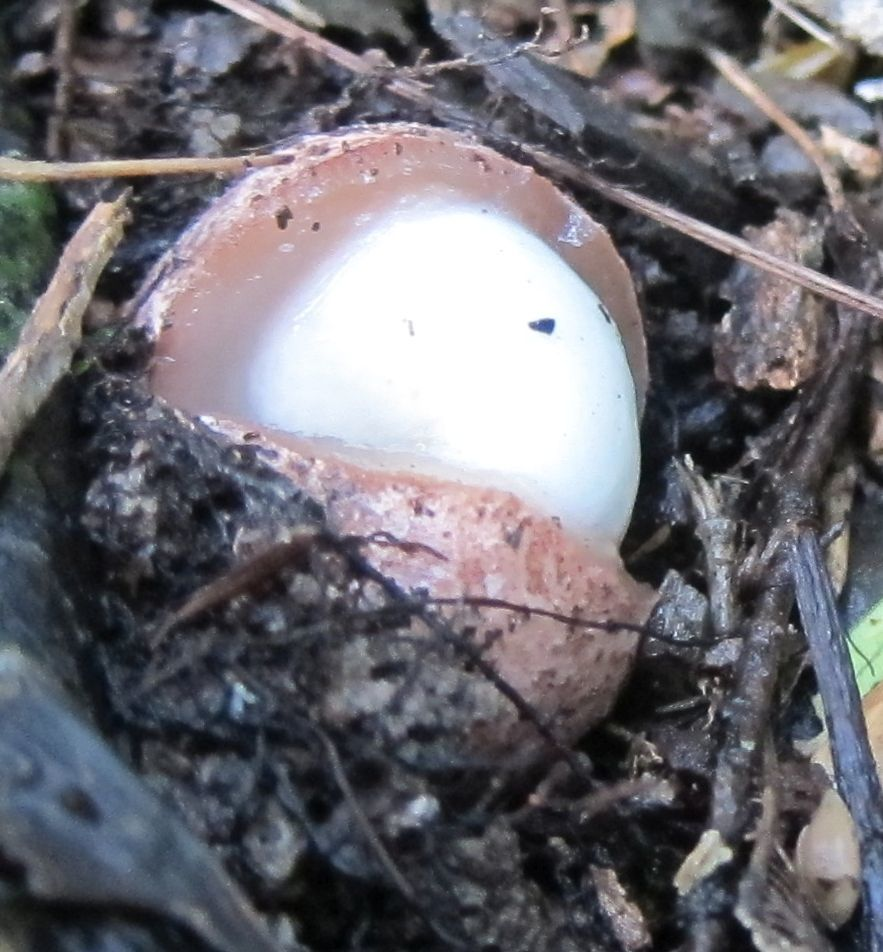
C. fischeri 'egg' observed under Kunzea robusta (kānuka) south of Dunedin, New Zealand

Claustula is a fungal genus in the family Claustulaceae. It is monotypic, containing the single truffle-like species Claustula fischeri, described in 1926 and found in New Zealand and Tasmania. In May 2016, it was one of two native New Zealand fungi added to the IUCN Red List of Threatened Species as endangered.

== Taxonomy and etymology ==
Claustula is a fungal genus in the family Claustulaceae. It is monotypic, containing the single truffle-like species Claustula fischeri K.M.Curtis, which was described in 1926 by New Zealand botanist and mycologist Kathleen Curtis. The first specimens were found and collected by Curtis in 1923 near Nelson, and the holotype is housed at the USDA United States National Fungus Collections (BPI).

The species epithet fischeri honours Swiss mycologist Eduard Fischer, whose studies included genera and species in the order Phallales, which is the order to which Claustula belongs.

== Distribution and habitat ==
Claustula fischeri is native to New Zealand and Tasmania. It is found on the ground in wet native forest (Eucalyptus, Nothofagus, Leptopsermum or Kunzea) and often appears in autumn.

== Conservation status ==
In May 2016, it was one of two native New Zealand fungi added to the IUCN Red List of Threatened Species as endangered. In New Zealand, it is considered to be Threatened - Nationally Critical under the New Zealand Threat Classification System.
