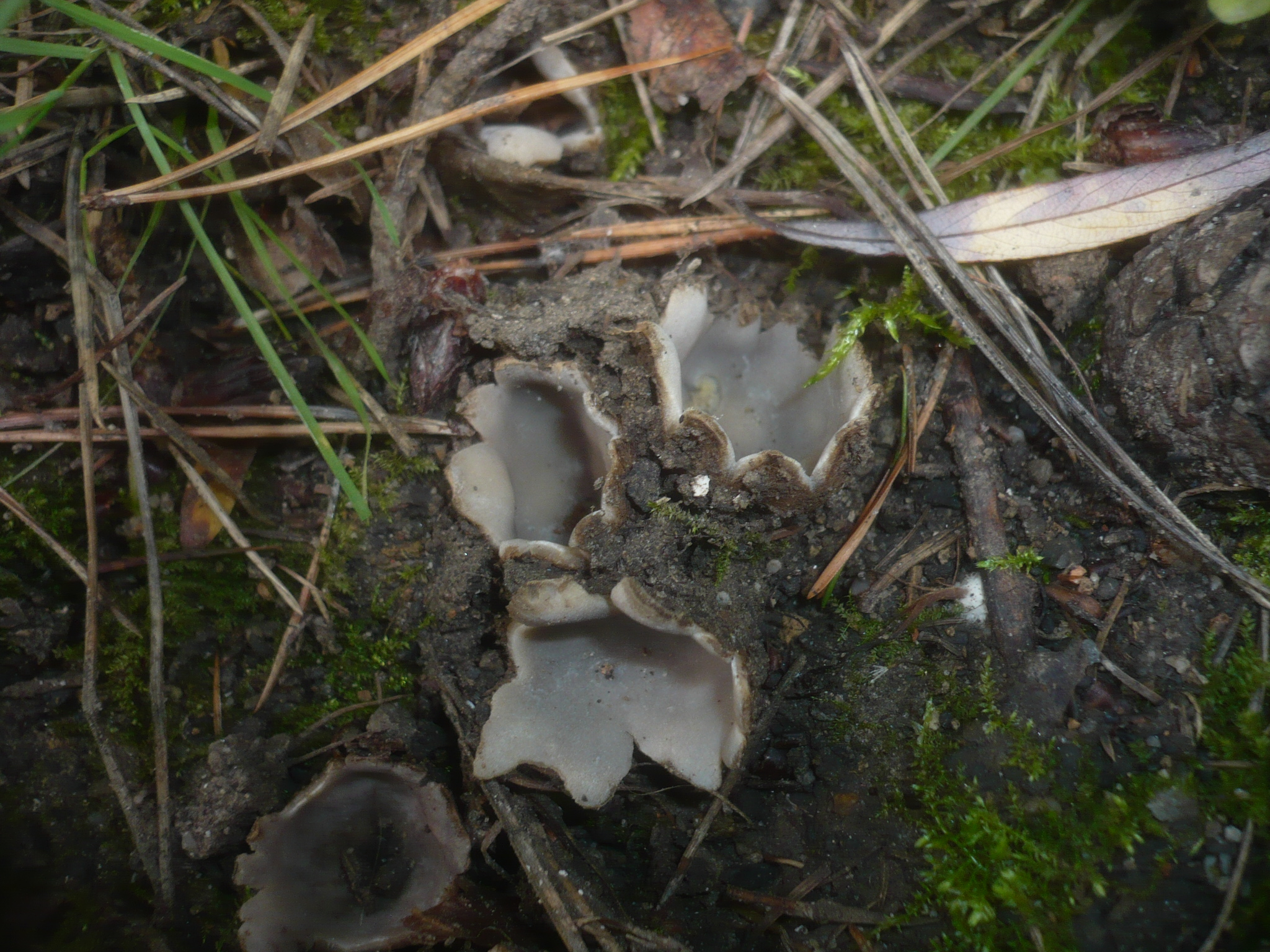

Scientific classification
- Kingdom: Fungi
- Division: Ascomycota
- Class: Pezizomycetes
- Order: Pezizales
- Family: Pyronemataceae
- Genus: Geopora
- Species: G. arenicola

Binomial name
- Geopora arenicola (Lév.) Kers (1974)

Synonyms
- List: Peziza arenicola Lév. (1848); Peziza bloxamii Cooke (1876); Lachnea arenicola (Lév.) Gillet (1879); Lachnea arenicola (Lév.) W.Phillips (1887); Lachnea arenicola var. bloxamii (Cooke) W.Phillips (1887); Sepultaria arenicola (Lév.) Massee (1895); Lachnea arenosa var. bloxamii (Cooke) Sacc. & Traverso [as 'bloxami'] (1910); Sepultaria arenicola var. bloxamii (Cooke) Ramsb. (1914)

= Geopora arenicola =

Species of fungus

Geopora arenicola
- Mycological characteristics
- Smooth hymenium
- Hymenium attachment is irregular or not applicable
- Lacks a stipe
- Spore print is white
- Ecology is mycorrhizal
- Edibility is inedible or poisonous

Geopora arenicola, commonly known as the hole in the ground truffle, is a species of fungus belonging to the family Pyronemataceae. It is an uncommon species found in Europe and Uzbekistan.

The fungus forms a rounded ascocarp underground on sandy loam soils. This fruit body remains subterranean for most of the year but breaks the surface in the spring to form a cream-coloured cup (apothecium) up to 3 cm (1 1/4 in) wide and tall.

It is likely mycorrhizal, but it is difficult to determine the host species.

It is too difficult to clean off the sand or dirt to be of culinary interest.
