= Geopora sepulta =

Scientific classification
- Kingdom: Fungi
- Division: Ascomycota
- Class: Pezizomycetes
- Order: Pezizales
- Family: Pyronemataceae
- Genus: Geopora
- Species: G. sepulta

Binomial name
- Geopora sepulta Fr., 1851

Species of fungus

Geopora sepulta

Geopora sepulta is a species of fungus belonging to the family Pyronemataceae. It is an uncommon European species. The first accepted record for Britain was a specimen collected in Kent in 1995.

This fungus forms a rounded ascocarp underground on sandy loam soils. This fruiting body remains subterranean for most of the year but breaks the surface in the spring to form a creamy-grey cup (apothecium) up to 4.5 cm across and 3 cm tall. It usually occurs in small groups.
