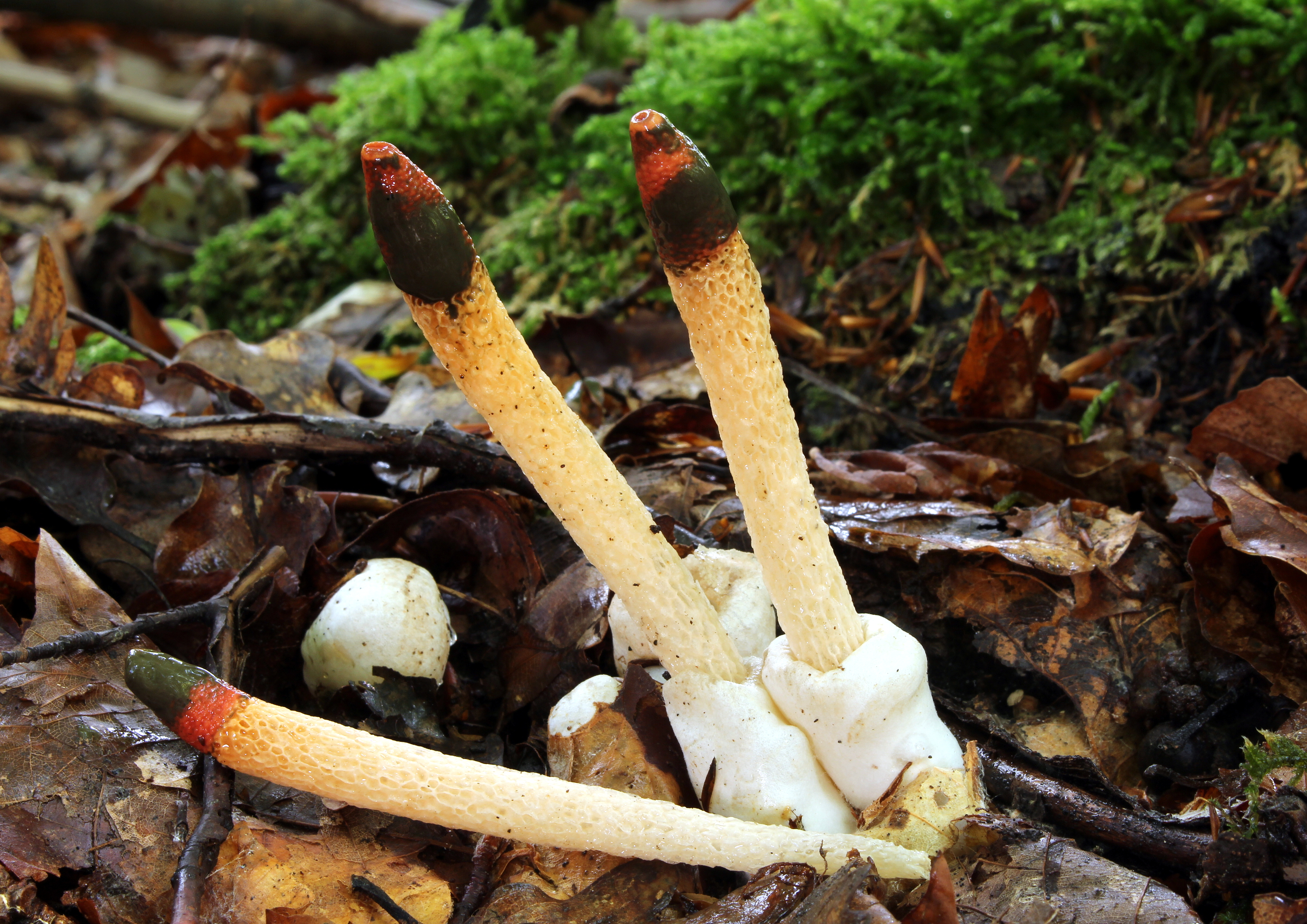

Scientific classification
- Kingdom: Fungi
- Division: Basidiomycota
- Class: Agaricomycetes
- Order: Phallales
- Family: Phallaceae
- Genus: Mutinus
- Species: M. caninus

Binomial name
- Mutinus caninus (Huds.) Fr. (1849)

Synonyms
- Phallus caninus Huds. (1778); Phallus inodorus Sowerby (1801); Ithyphallus inodorus Gray (1821); Aedycia canina (Huds.) Kuntze (1898); Cynophallus caninus (Huds.) Fr. (1860)

= Mutinus caninus =

Dog stinkhorn

Species of fungus

Mutinus caninus
- Mycological characteristics
- Smooth hymenium
- No distinct cap
- Stipe has a volva
- Spore print is olive-brown
- Ecology is saprotrophic
- Edibility is not recommended

Mutinus caninus, commonly known as the dog stinkhorn, is a small thin, phallus-shaped woodland fungus, with a dark tip. It is often found growing in small groups on wood debris or in leaf litter during summer and autumn in Eurasia and eastern North America. It is not generally considered edible, but there are reports of the immature 'eggs' being consumed.

== Taxonomy ==
The genus name Mutinus was a phallic deity, Mutinus Titinus (known to the Greeks as Priapus), one of the Roman di indigetes placated by Roman brides, and caninus means "dog-like" in Latin. Mutinus is the diminutive of muto, a Latin word for Penis. It was described initially by William Hudson (1730–1793), a noted British botanist. Its common names in French, Phallus de Chien, Satyre des chiens, also hint at its resemblance to a dog penis. It is commonly known as the "dog stinkhorn".

== Description ==
This small member of the family Phallaceae emerges from an off-white egg-like fruiting body that lies half buried in leaf litter on the woodland floor. White mycelial cords (rhizomorphs), are often visible beneath this 'egg', which is 2–4 cm (1–1.5 in) high, and 1–2 cm (0.5–1 in) wide. The 'egg' has a tough outer skin (peridium), which covers a gelatinous inner layer, which in turn protects the fully formed, but unexpanded fruiting body. When the ‘egg’ splits open the fungus expands rapidly (usually within a few hours), to its full height of 10–12 cm (4–4.5 in). It is around 1 cm (0.5 in) thick, and is either yellowish-white, yellow, or pale orange. The split egg is retained as a volva-like sack, at the base. The column is very fragile, pitted, and cylindrical. It has a pointed tip, and is usually curved. The tip is covered in the spore bearing matter (gleba) which is a dark olive-brown paste, and has a smell which is irresistible to insects. (These insects help distribute the spores on their bodies, and in their stomachs.) Beneath the spore mass the tip is dark orange. Although its smell is not as strong as the related common stinkhorn (Phallus impudicus), it has been described as smelling like cat faeces.

American mycologist Sanford Myron Zeller described an albino form of the fungus based on collections made in Warrengon, Oregon. It is essentially identical to the regular form but pure white throughout, except for the gleba. This form, named M. caninus var. albus, was first mentioned in the scientific literature by Edward Angus Burt in 1896.

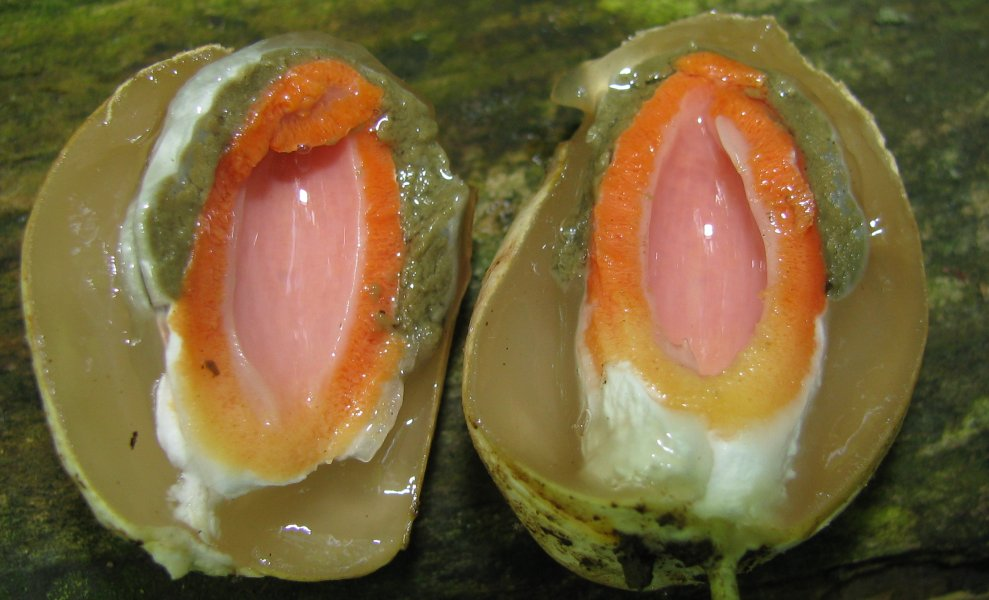
Cross section of the young 'egg'

=== Similar species ===
Mutinus ravenelii is pinker in coloration, with a red tip. It is a rarer American species, now spreading in Europe. Another North American species Mutinus elegans is very similar to M. ravenelii, and is short and stocky, with a more pointed apex.

== Distribution and habitat ==
The dog stinkhorn is found occasionally and is quite common in Europe, Britain, and eastern North America. The fungus is listed in the red data list of Ukraine. A collection from the Canary Islands was noted as the southernmost collection for the species in the Northern Hemisphere. It has also been collected in Iran, Turkey, and China, including Hebei, Jilin, and Guangdong. It appears from summer to late autumn, and is usually found in small groups; in leaf litter; on wood debris, or wooded roadsides. It may occur in both deciduous, and coniferous woods. The fruit bodies of the fungus can serve as a food source for thief ants and developing blow flies (Phormia regina).

== Edibility ==
The dog stinkhorn is probably edible at the 'egg' stage, but it is not recommended. At least one report from the eastern United States strongly recommends the 'eggs' peeled and fried as a tasty dish.

== Gallery ==
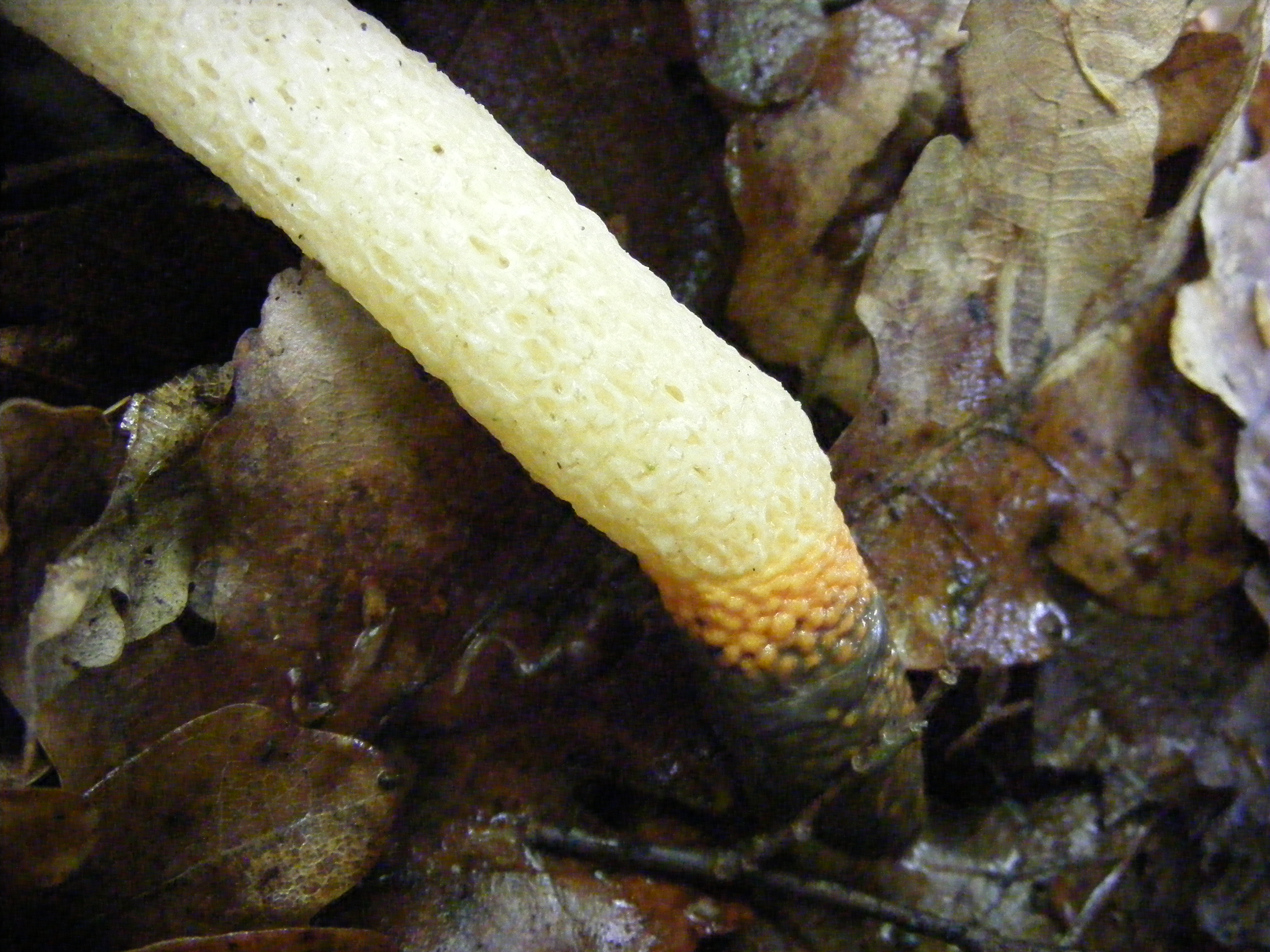

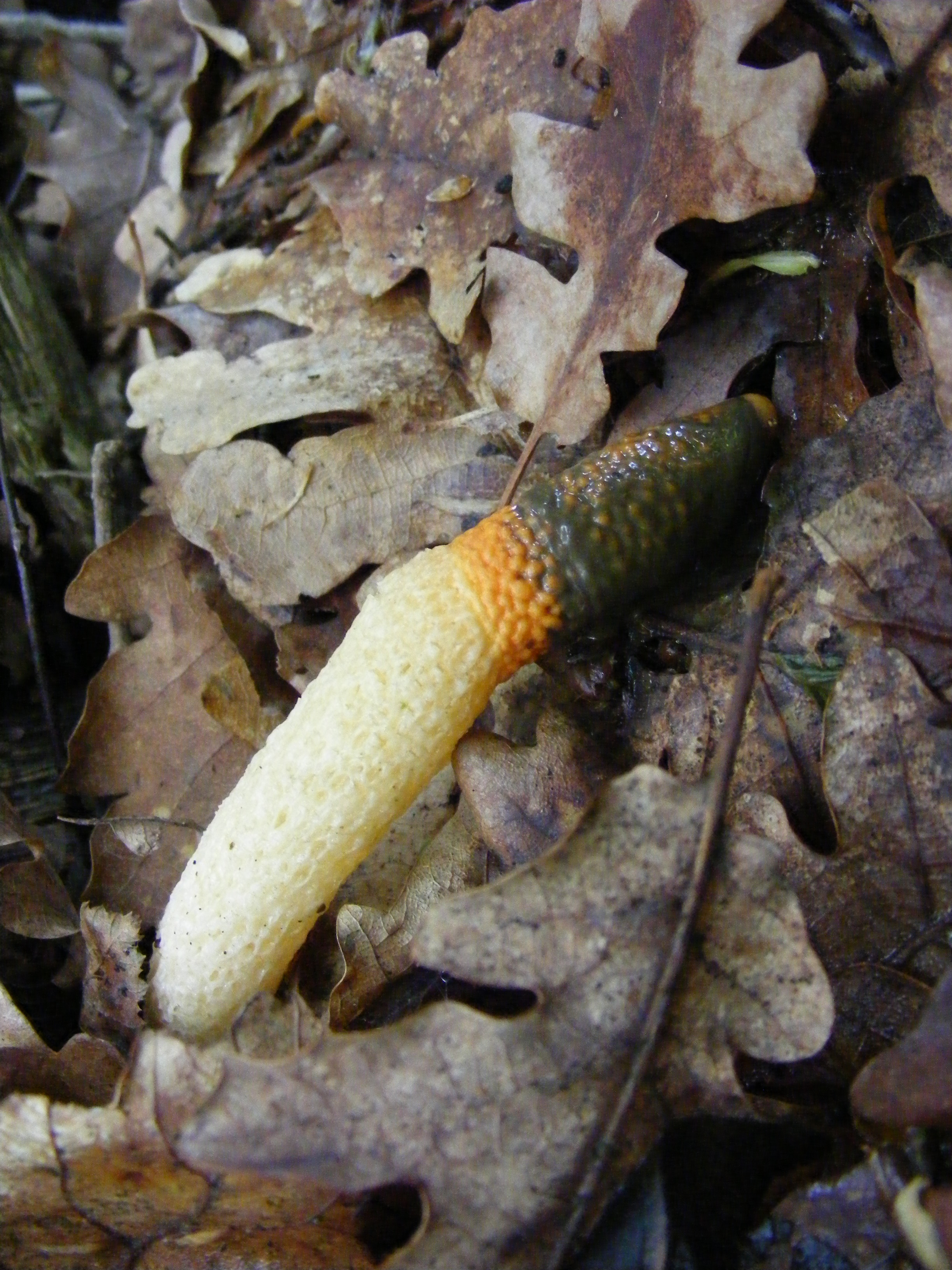

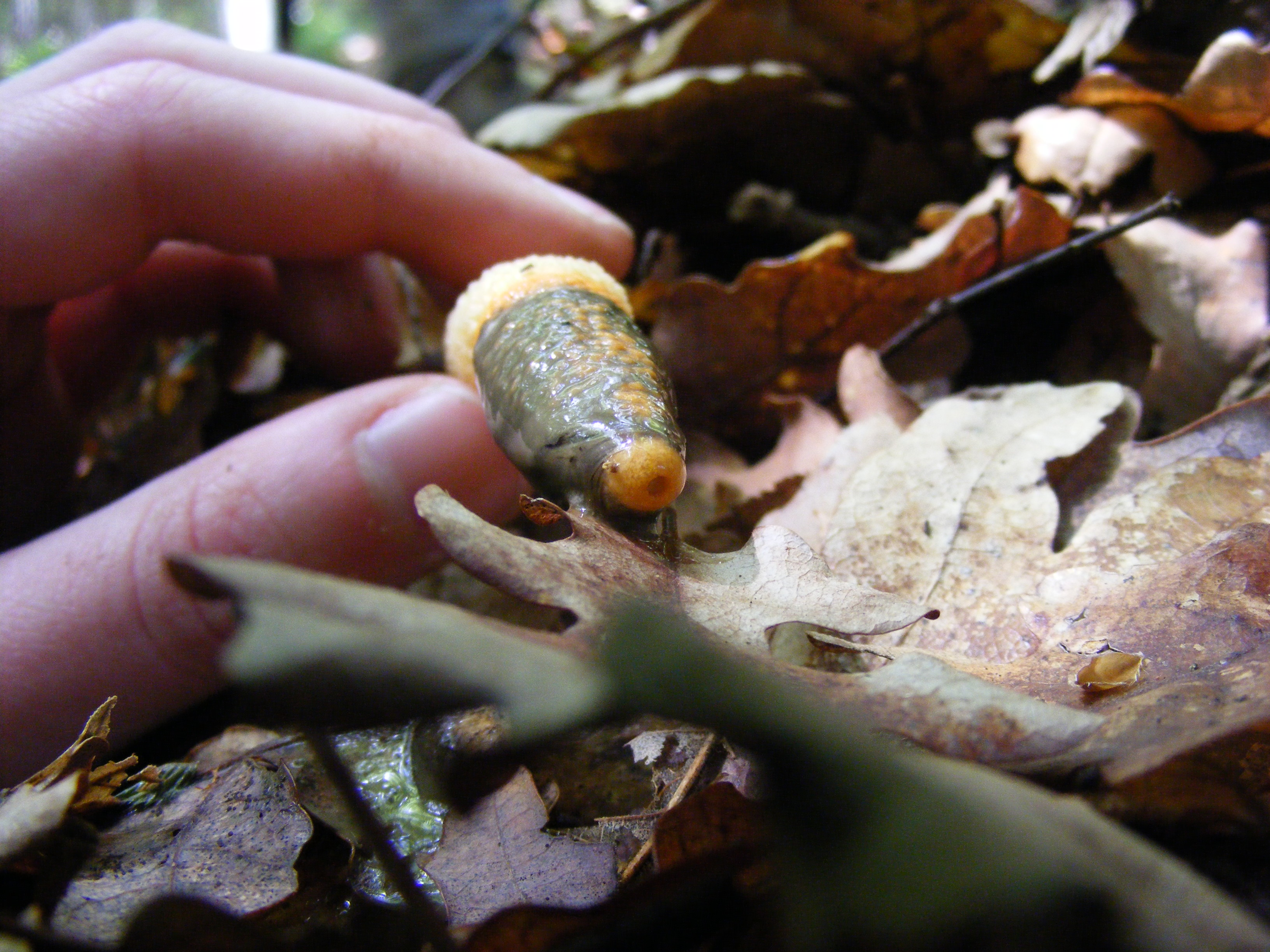

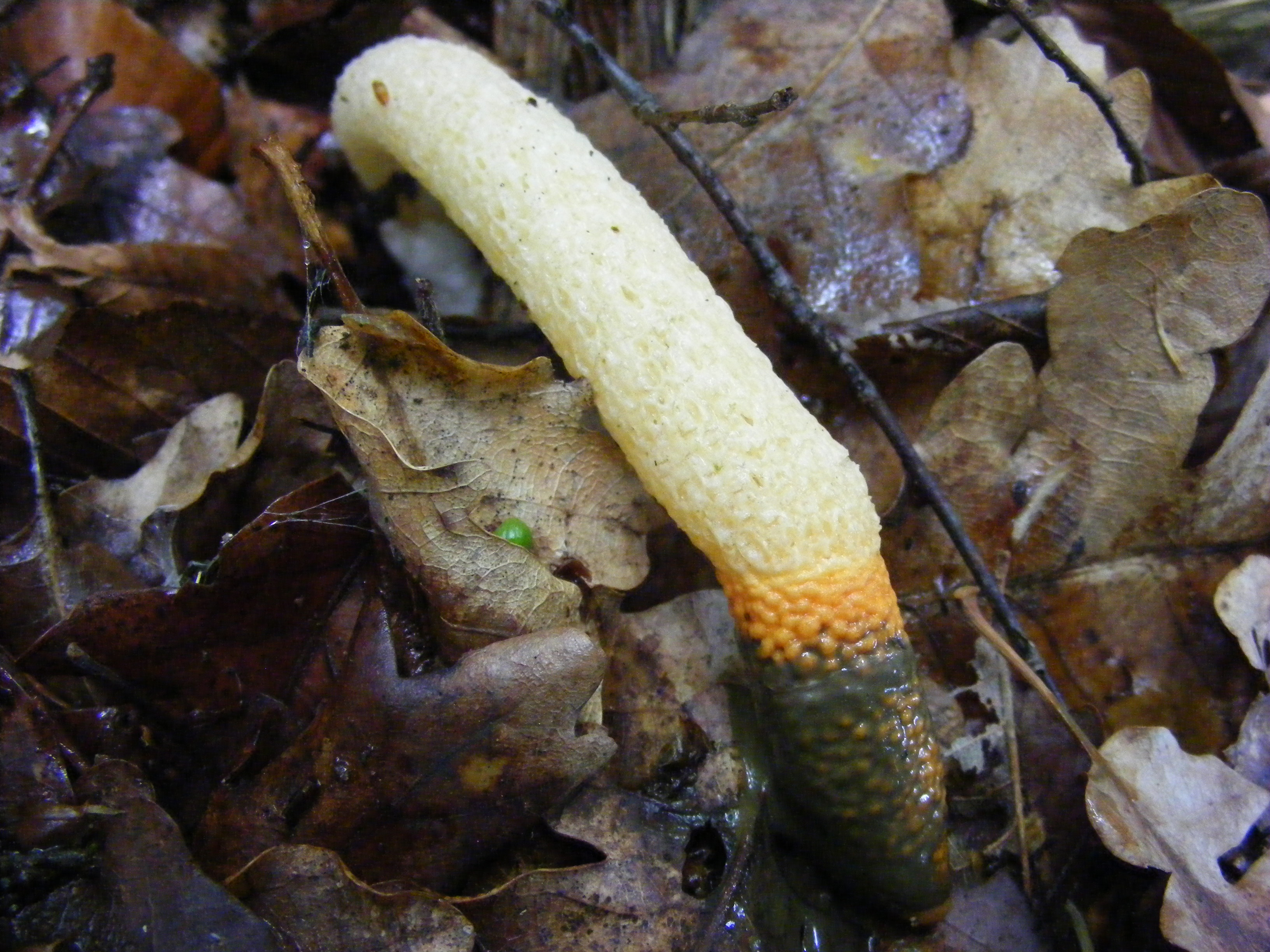

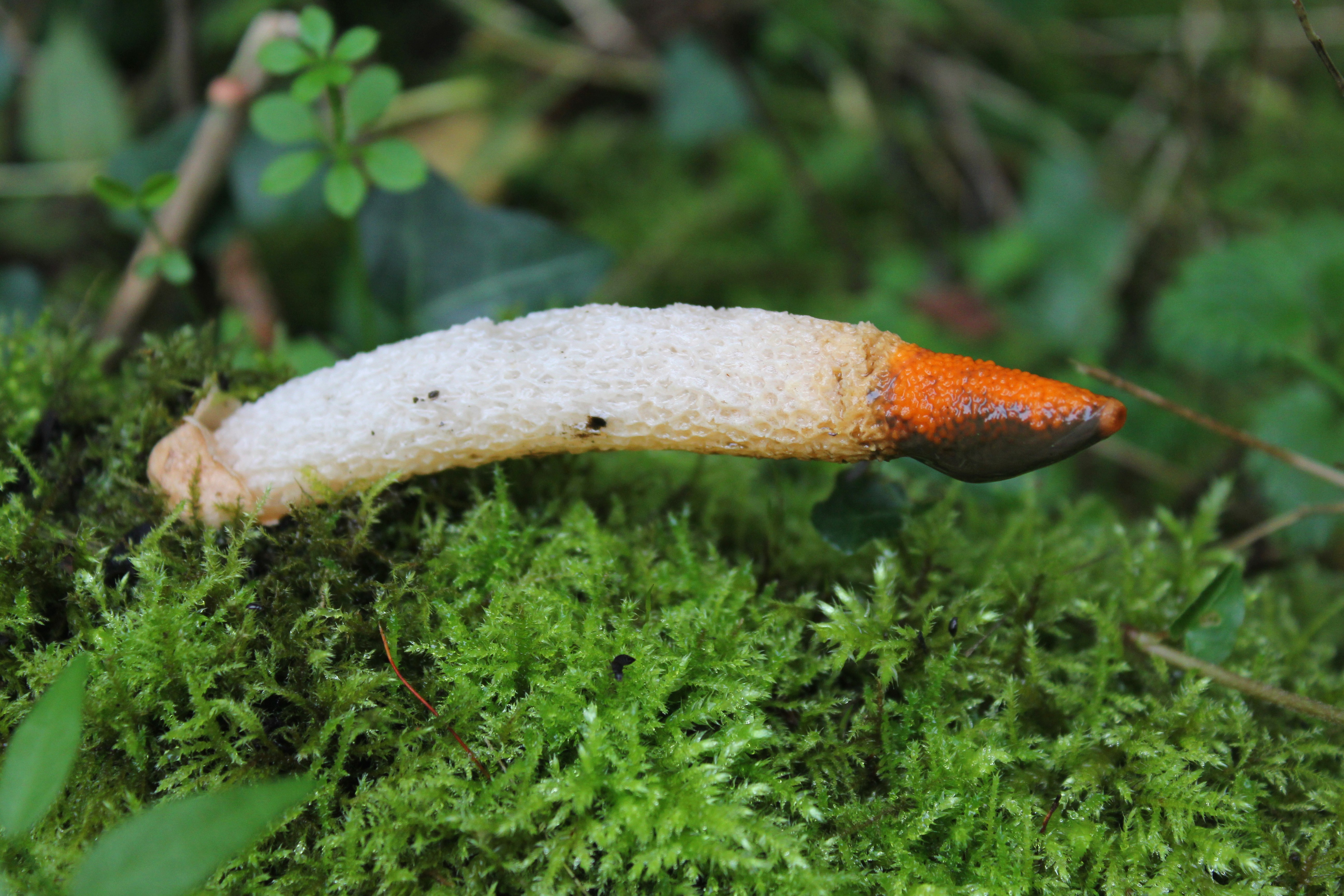

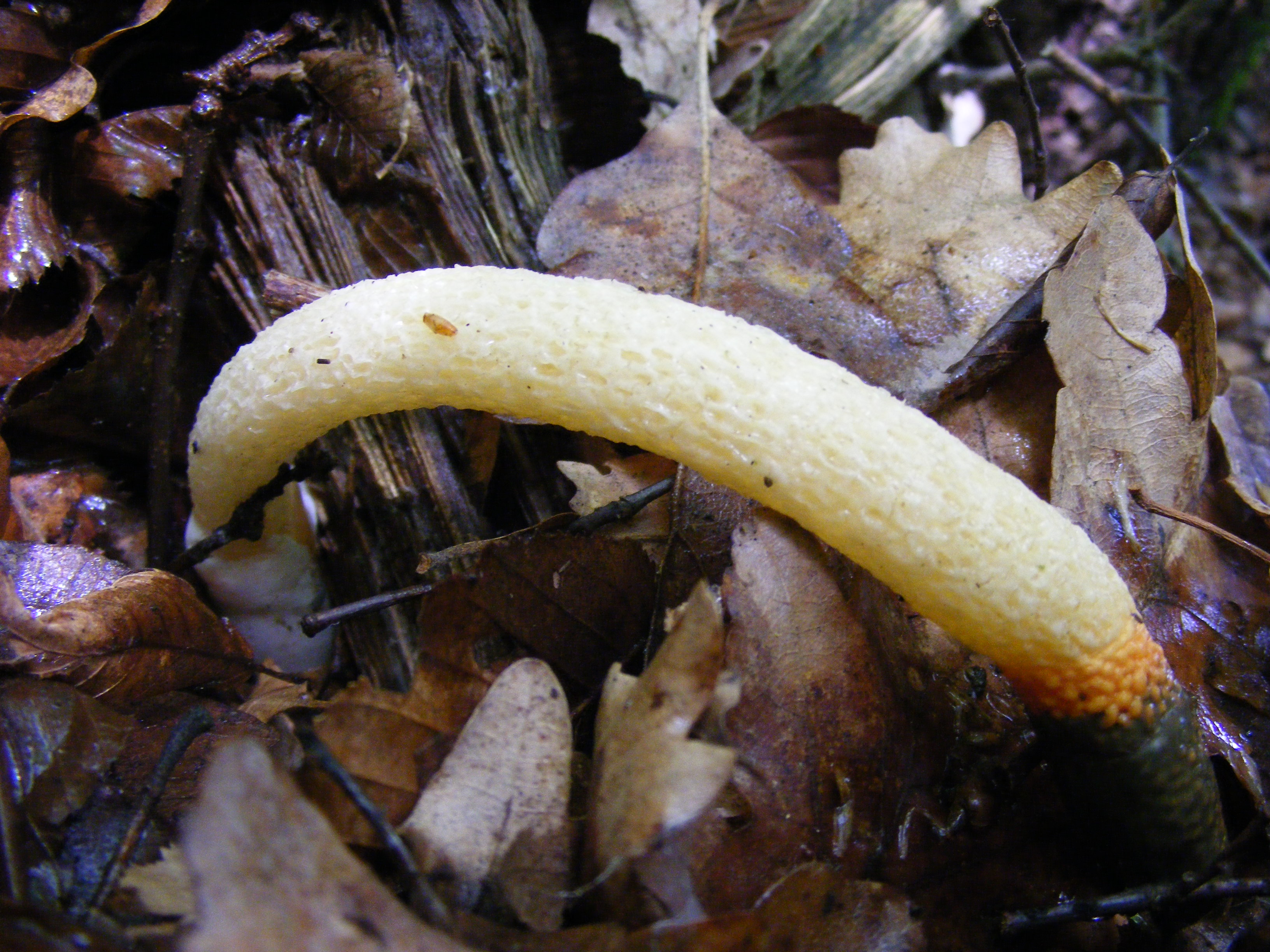
