= Harknessiella =

Scientific classification
- Kingdom: Fungi
- Division: Ascomycota
- Class: Dothideomycetes
- Subclass: incertae sedis
- Genus: Harknessiella; Sacc. (1883)

Type species
- Harknessiella purpurea (W.Phillips & Harkn.) Sacc. (1889)

Species of fungus

Harknessiella is a genus of fungi in the class Dothideomycetes. The relationship of this taxon to other taxa within the class is unknown (incertae sedis). This is a monotypic genus, containing the single species Harknessiella purpurea.

It was named after Harvey Willson “H.W.” Harkness.

The genus was circumscribed by Pier Andrea Saccardo in Syll. Fung. vol.8 on page 845 in 1889.

== See also ==
- List of Dothideomycetes genera incertae sedis
