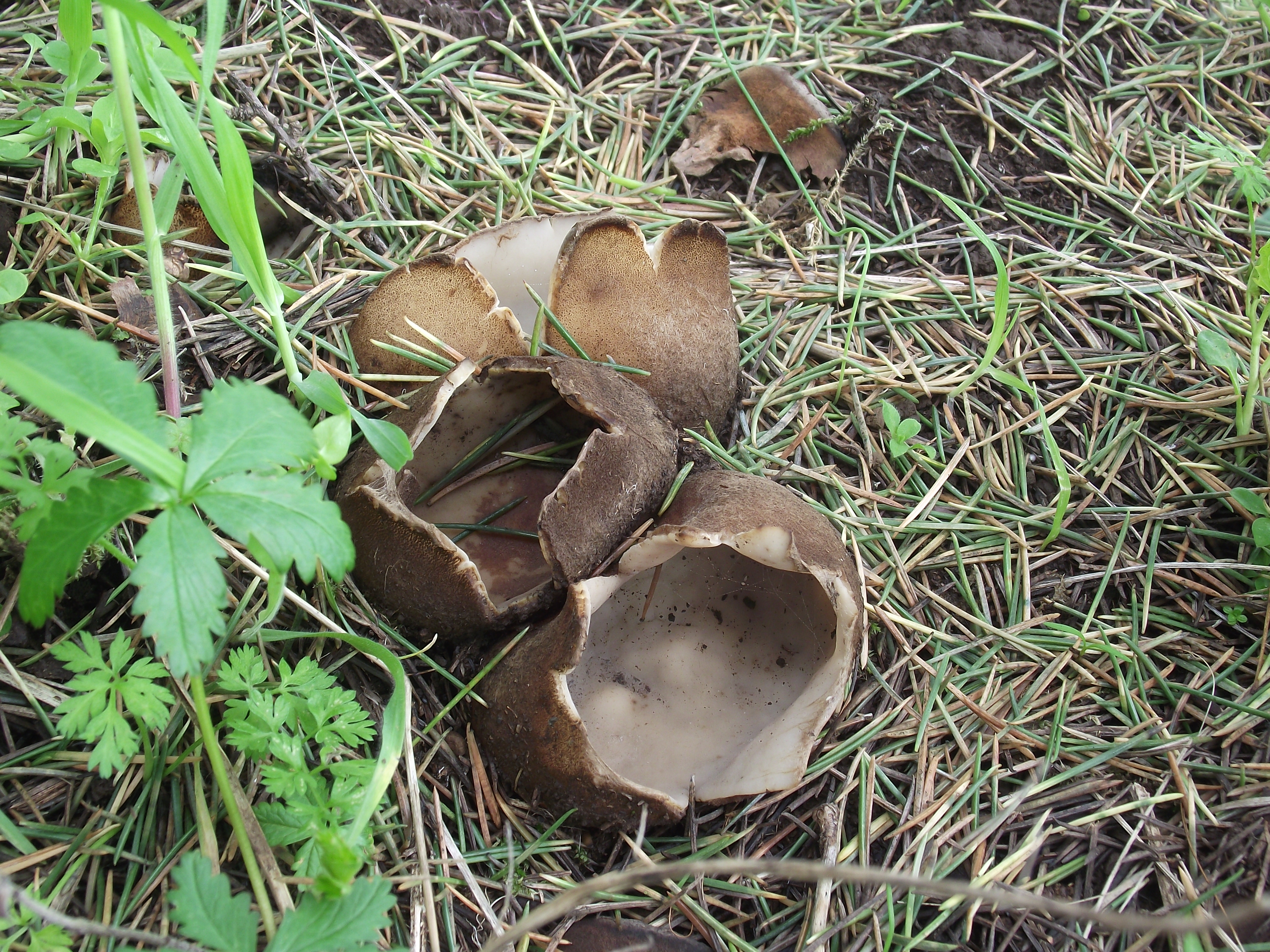

Scientific classification
- Domain: Eukaryota
- Kingdom: Fungi
- Division: Ascomycota
- Class: Pezizomycetes
- Order: Pezizales
- Family: Pyronemataceae
- Genus: Geopora
- Species: G. sumneriana

Binomial name
- Geopora sumneriana (Cooke) M.Torre (1976)

Synonyms
- Peziza sumneriana Cooke (1876)

= Geopora sumneriana =

Species of fungus

Geopora sumneriana is a species of European fungus belonging to the family Pyronemataceae.

This fungus forms a rounded brown, roughly hairy ascocarp underground. This fruit body remains subterranean for most of the year but breaks the surface in the spring to form a cream-coloured cup (apothecium) up to 7 cm across and 5 cm tall. This species occurs in small groups and is exclusively found associated with cedar trees.
