= John Banister (naturalist) =

English naturalist

John Baptist Banister (1649 or 1650 – May 1692) was an English clergyman and one of the first university-trained naturalists in North America. His primary focus was botany but he also studied insects and molluscs. He was sent out as a missionary chaplain by the garden-loving Bishop Henry Compton, with whom he soon established a correspondence. Banister was first in Barbados in the West Indies and then by April 1679 in Virginia, where, while serving a rector of the parish of Charles City he became one of Bishop Compton's most energetic plant collectors, "the first Virginia botanist of any note".

Banister matriculated at Magdalen College, Oxford, where he could see and study the American plants grown from seed in the Oxford Physic Garden under the care of Dr. Robert Morison. From Virginia, his first letter to Dr Morison at the Oxford Physic Garden was dated 1679: in it he listed the bounty of American oaks that would supplement Britain's impoverished flora: dwarf, black, white, red, Spanish, chestnut, live or willow, shrubby. The historian of American gardens Ann Leighton surmises that Banister's list of Virginian timber trees provided some of the material for John Evelyn's list of desirable plants of Virginia and New England, intended to be given to a captain sailing for New England. Once settled in Virginia, where he purchased a tract of 1,735 acres (7.02 km^{2}) on the Appomattox River in 1689/90, he established a close friendship with William Byrd of Westover, an influential Virginia planter with botanical connections in London. By 1692 Banister had become a substantial figure in Virginia, one of the founders of the College of William & Mary in Williamsburg that year; Bishop Compton was on the college's board of overseers.

Banister contemplated writing a natural history of Virginia; perhaps it was as a preliminary gesture he sent some fine botanical drawings and herbarium specimens to the botanist James Petiver, a London apothecary and Fellow of the Royal Society. According to Jon Kukla Robert Beverley's History and Present State of Virginia (London, 1705) reproduced extensive passages on natural history and the Indians from manuscripts of Banister. Banister sent numerous occasional papers to the Royal Society that were published in its Philosophical Transactions, providing "the first scientific account for Virginia in the field of descriptive botany, entomology, and malacology. His letter describing Mutinus elegans, a stinkhorn, is thought to be the first report of a fungus from North America. Among them were "Observations on the natural productions of Jamaica"; "The Insects of Virginia" (with James Petiver,1700); "Curiosities in Virginia"; "Observations on the Musca lupus"; "On Several Sorts of Snails"; and "A Description of the Snakeroot, Pistolochia or Serpentaria Virginiania." He compiled a catalogue of American plants, the first flora of North America; it was published in the second volume of John Ray's Historia Plantarum (London, 1688-1704), a comprehensive catalog of plant taxonomy. He was accidentally shot dead by Jacob Colson while exploring the lower Roanoke River in company with some men of Byrd's entourage. John Lawson in his New Voyage to Carolina saluted Banister's memory in 1709, as "the greatest Virtuoso we ever had on this Continent".

Notable plants he collected and sent to his bishop, Henry Compton, in England included balsam fir (Abies balsamea), box elder (Acer negundo), honey locust (Gleditsia triacanthos), liquidambar (Liquidambar styraciflua), scarlet oak (Quercus coccinea), and Sweetbay magnolia (Magnolia virginiana).

Banister's library in Virginia was dispersed after his death and his lists and papers found their way to publication through other botanists, beginning with James Petiver, whose Museum Petiveranum gives 65 common names for Banister's plants sent to Bishop Compton, where Banister's Virginian trees were flourishing in the gardens of Fulham Palace.

Banister was commemorated by Linnaeus who gave the name Banisteria to a tropical genus of Malpighiaceae. Banisteriopsis also references Banister's name; the two genera are very close relatives and are sometimes merged under the older name Banisteria.

His grandson, Col. John Banister, was one of the prominent Virginians of the American Revolution.
