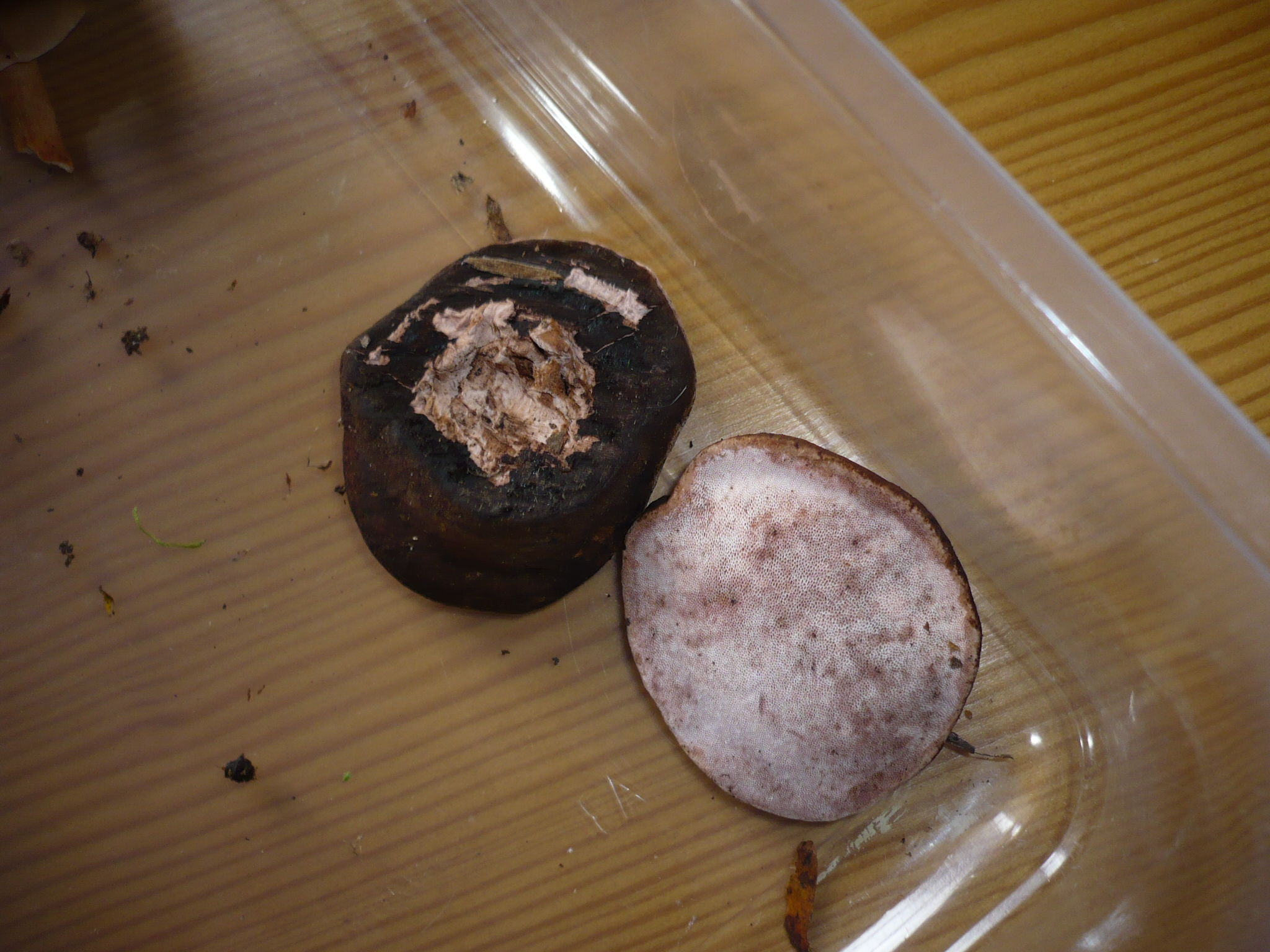
- Genea hispidula

Scientific classification
- Kingdom: Fungi
- Division: Ascomycota
- Class: Pezizomycetes
- Order: Pezizales
- Family: Pyronemataceae
- Genus: Genea; Vittad. (1831)

Type species
- Genea verrucosa Klotzsch (1839)

Synonyms
- Hydnocaryon Wallr. (1833)

= Genea (fungus) =

Genus of fungi

Genea is a genus of truffle-like fungi in the family Pyronemataceae. There are about 32 species in the genus that occur in North America and Europe.

With the help of a trained dog, scientists discovered 2024 that there are probably still some non-descript species. Furthermore, these truffles seem to disappear completely from the fir-dominated forests for years after a forest fire.

The genus was circumscribed by Italian mycologist Carlo Vittadini in 1831.

The genus name of Genea is in honour of Carlo Giuseppe Gené (1800 - 1847), who was an Italian scientist (Zoology) and Professor of Zoology at the Turin Museum of Natural History.

== Selected species ==
- Genea anthracina
- Genea balsleyi
- Genea cazaresii
- Genea eucalyptorum
- Genea harknessii
- Genea hispidula
- Genea klotzschii
- Genea kraspedostoma
- Genea papillosa
- Genea pseudoverrucosa
- Genea sphaerica
- Genea subbaetica
- Genea verrucosa
