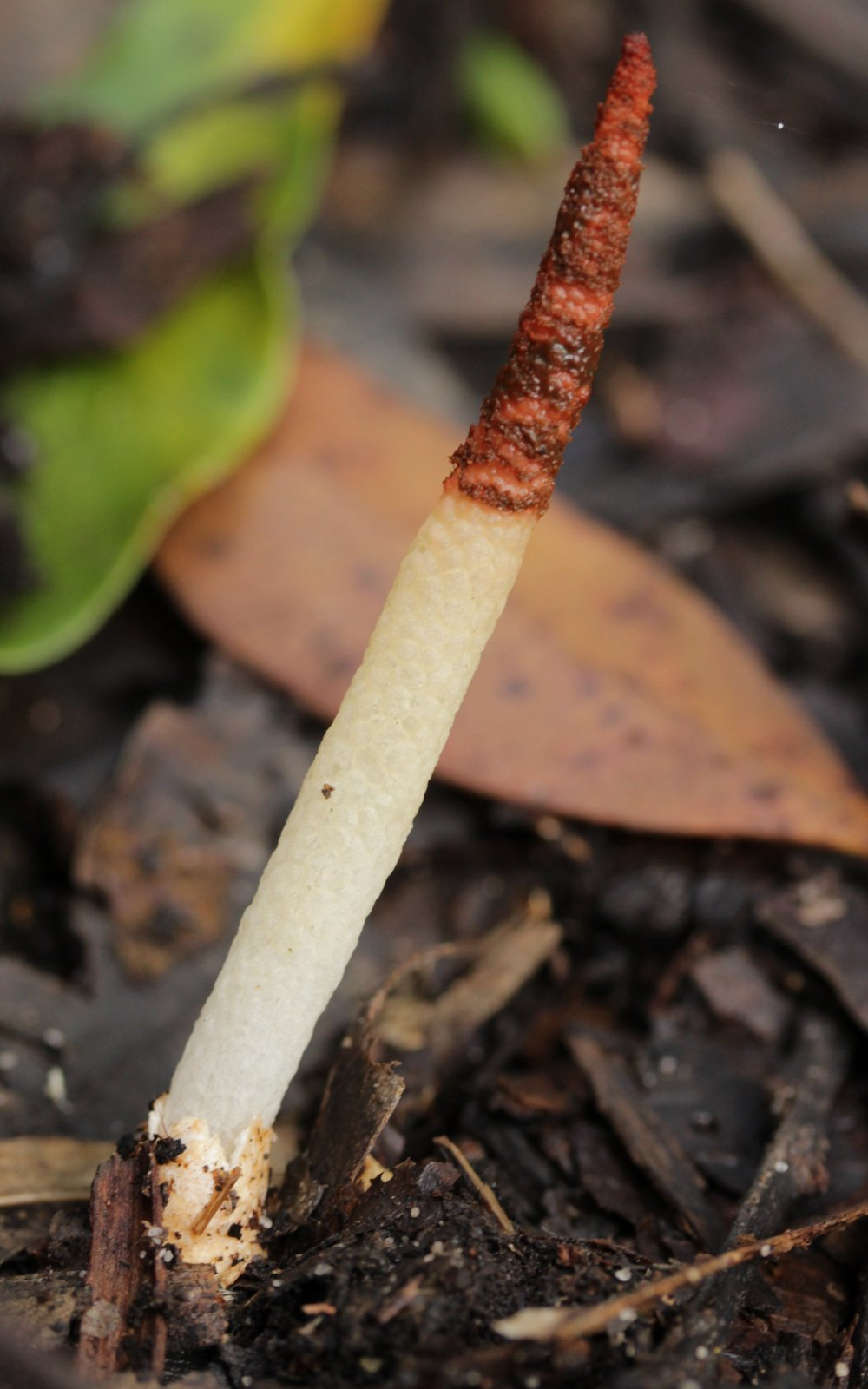
- Ferndale Park, Australia

Scientific classification
- Domain: Eukaryota
- Kingdom: Fungi
- Division: Basidiomycota
- Class: Agaricomycetes
- Order: Phallales
- Family: Phallaceae
- Genus: Mutinus
- Species: M. boninensis

Binomial name
- Mutinus boninensis Lloyd 1908

= Mutinus boninensis =

Species of fungus

Mutinus boninensis is a member of the Phallaceae (stinkhorn) family. It is a small stinkhorn which may be seen in humid areas in Australia, New Caledonia and possibly other areas in the Pacific region.
