= Hosakaea =

Scientific classification
- Kingdom: Fungi
- Division: Basidiomycota
- Class: Agaricomycetes
- Order: Phallales
- Family: Claustulaceae
- Genus: Hosakaea; Mujic & M.E.Smith (2024)
- Species: H. violascens

Binomial name
- Hosakaea violascens (Choeyklin, Boonprat & Somrith) Mujic & M.E.Smith (2024)

Synonyms
- Octaviania violascens Choeyklin, Boonprat. & Somrith. (2012)

Genus of fungi

Hosakaea is a fungal genus in the family Claustulaceae. The genus contains the single truffle-like species Hosakaea violascens, which is found in Thailand. It is named after Kentaro Hosaka, curator of Basidiomycota fungi at the Japanese National Museum of Nature and Science.

== Description ==
The basidiocarps of Hosakaea violascens typically reaches sizes between 9 to 18 mm in height and 12 to 22 mm in width when dried. These basidiocarps are typically egg-shaped (ovoid), almost spherical (subglobose), or shaped like an inverted spinning top (turbinate), with a colour transitioning from white or cream at the base to various shades of reddish grey or rose towards the upper part. When damaged or sliced, they can change to reddish or deep violet.

The outer layer of the basidiocarp, known as the peridium, is thin and predominantly white, changing to pale violet when cut. The internal mass, or gleba, is initially solid and dark brown when fresh, becoming lighter and developing a central cavity as it dries. This gleba contains compartments, or locules, filled with powdery spores and separated by white, fibrous tissue which also turns violet when damaged. Hosakaea violascens does not produce latex, a milky fluid found in some fungi, and lacks a central support column known as a columella. It has a non-distinctive smell.

The spores of Hosakaea violascens vary in appearance: some are without spines and others have spiny surfaces. The spineless spores measure between 11 to 19 micrometres (μm) by 11 to 15 μm, while the spined ones range from 12 to 18 μm by 10 to 20 μm. Spore surfaces may be smooth or covered in echinulate to conical spines. They appear pale yellowish-brown to dark brown in colour and have a reaction (dextrinoid reaction) when treated with chemical reagents like potassium iodide.

The reproductive cells of the fungus, known as basidia, are club-shaped to spindle-shaped and produce spores. They change from transparent to brown as they mature. The surrounding tissue, or peridial context, consists of two types of hyphae: thin-walled, nutrient-carrying oleiferous (lipid-containing) hyphae, and thick-walled, structural binding hyphae. Additionally, cells known as sphaeropedunculate cells, which are round and thick-walled, are embedded within this tissue.

The internal structures, including the tramal plate and subhymenium, are part of the support system of the basidiocarp, and are transparent and thin-walled. The outer surface of the basidiocarp, the peridiopellis, consists of interwoven, thin-walled hyphae. The fungus has clamp connections in the peridial tissue.
