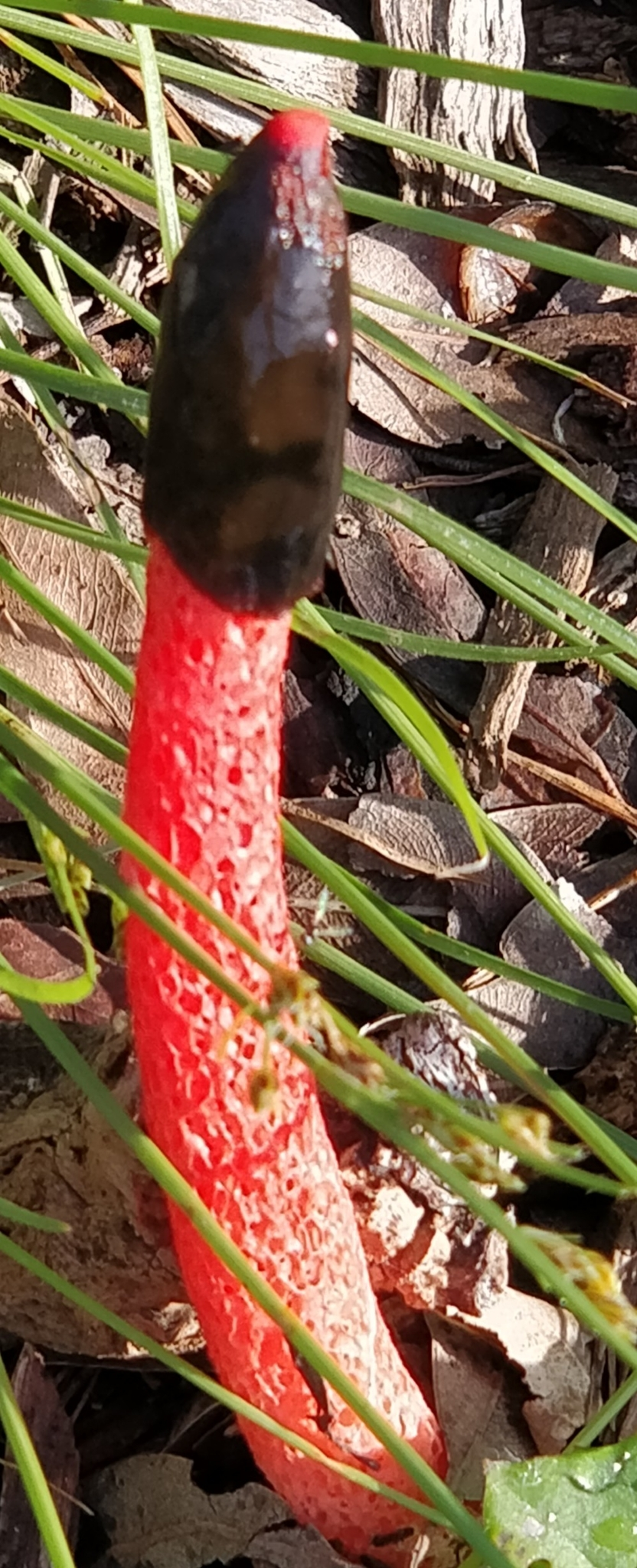

Scientific classification
- Kingdom: Fungi
- Division: Basidiomycota
- Class: Agaricomycetes
- Order: Phallales
- Family: Phallaceae
- Genus: Satyrus
- Species: S. rubicundus

Binomial name
- Satyrus rubicundus (Bosc) (1811)

Synonyms
- Phallus rubicundus Fries (1823); Ithyphallus rubicundus (Bosc) E.Fisch. (1888); Leiophallus rubicundus (Bosc) Mussat (1900)

= Phallus rubicundus =

Tropical stinkhorn fungus

Satyrus rubicundus
- Mycological characteristics
- Glebal hymenium
- Cap is conical
- Spore print is olive
- Ecology is saprotrophic
- Edibility is unknown

Satyrus rubicundus is a species of fungus in the stinkhorn family. First described in 1811, it has a wide distribution in tropical regions. It has the typical stinkhorn structure consisting of a spongy stalk up to 15 cm (5.9 in) tall arising from a gelatinous "egg" up to 3 cm (1.2 in) in diameter. Atop the stalk is a pitted, conical cap that has a foul-smelling, gelatinous, green spore mass spread over it.

== Taxonomy ==
The species was first described under the name Satyrus rubicundus by French botanist Louis Augustin Guillaume Bosc in 1811, from collections made in South Carolina. It was later transferred to the genus Phallus in 1823 by Elias Fries. Synonyms include binomials resulting from the transfer to Ithyphallus by Eduard Fischer in 1888, and to Leiophallus by Émile-Victor Mussat in 1900. The accepted name now is Satyrus rubicundus upon being moved to the genus Satyrus in 2025.

== Description ==
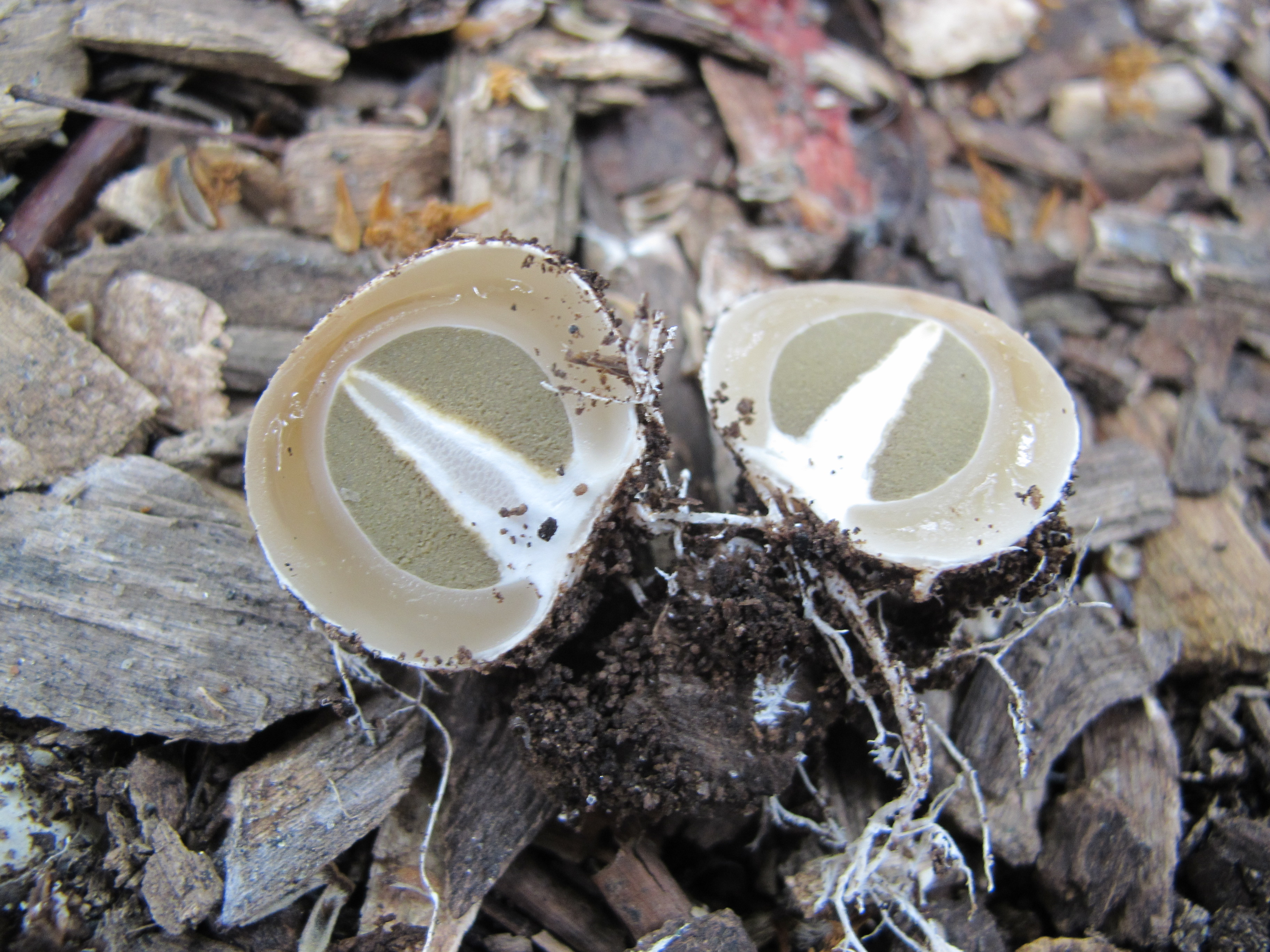
Bisected "egg" form

Immature (unopened) specimens of Satyrus rubicundus are spherical to egg-shaped, whitish, and measure 2–3 cm (0.8–1.2 in) long by 1–3 cm (0.4–1.2 in) wide. They occur singly or in groups of two to six eggs that are formed from a common mycelium. They are attached to the substrate by a cordlike rhizomorph. After expanding, the fruit bodies are up to 15 cm (5.9 in) tall, and consist of a hollow cylindrical stalk supporting a conical to bell-shaped cap. The orange to scarlet stalk tapers towards to top, and has a pitted surface. The wrinkled cap is scarlet red, and measures 2–3 cm (0.8–1.2 in) high by 1–2 cm (0.4–0.8 in) wide. It is initially covered with a foetid, slimy grayish-olive gleba. The egg case remains at the base of the stalk as a volva. The spores are smooth, elliptical, and measure 3.6–4.2 by 1.6–2.0 μm.

Phallus rubicundus is often confused with the similar Mutinus elegans, but the latter species does not have a clearly separated cap and instead bears its gleba on the apex of its pointed stalk. It is also easily confused with Satyrus rugulosus.

== Uses ==
In the Indian state of Madhya Pradesh, where it is known locally as jhiri pihiri, it is used by two primitive forest tribes, the Bharia and the Baiga, as a treatment against typhoid, and also by the Baiga to treat labour pain. The fungus is prepared by grinding and mixing with sugar-cake, and one teaspoon is administered three times daily. The fungus has been reported to have been used by Aboriginal Australians as an aphrodisiac.

One study noted that mosquitoes, attracted to the smell of the gleba, perish after consuming it, and so the fungus may be suitable for further investigating as a biocontrol agent.

== Ecology and distribution ==
The fungus is saprobic, and grows in sandy soils, lawns, gardens, and yards, especially those that are well-manured or use wood mulch. It is widely distributed in southern and eastern United States (including Hawaii), having possibly been spread through the use of imported wood mulch in landscaping. In Australia it grows mainly in the tropics and subtropics, in areas where rotten wood and/or mulch are present. In Asia, it has been recorded from China, Japan, Korea, India, and Thailand. African locales include Ghana, Nigeria, Congo, Kenya, and South Africa. It is also known from South America (Argentina and Brazil) and the Caribbean. The fungus was featured on a Sierra Leonean postage stamp in 1993.
