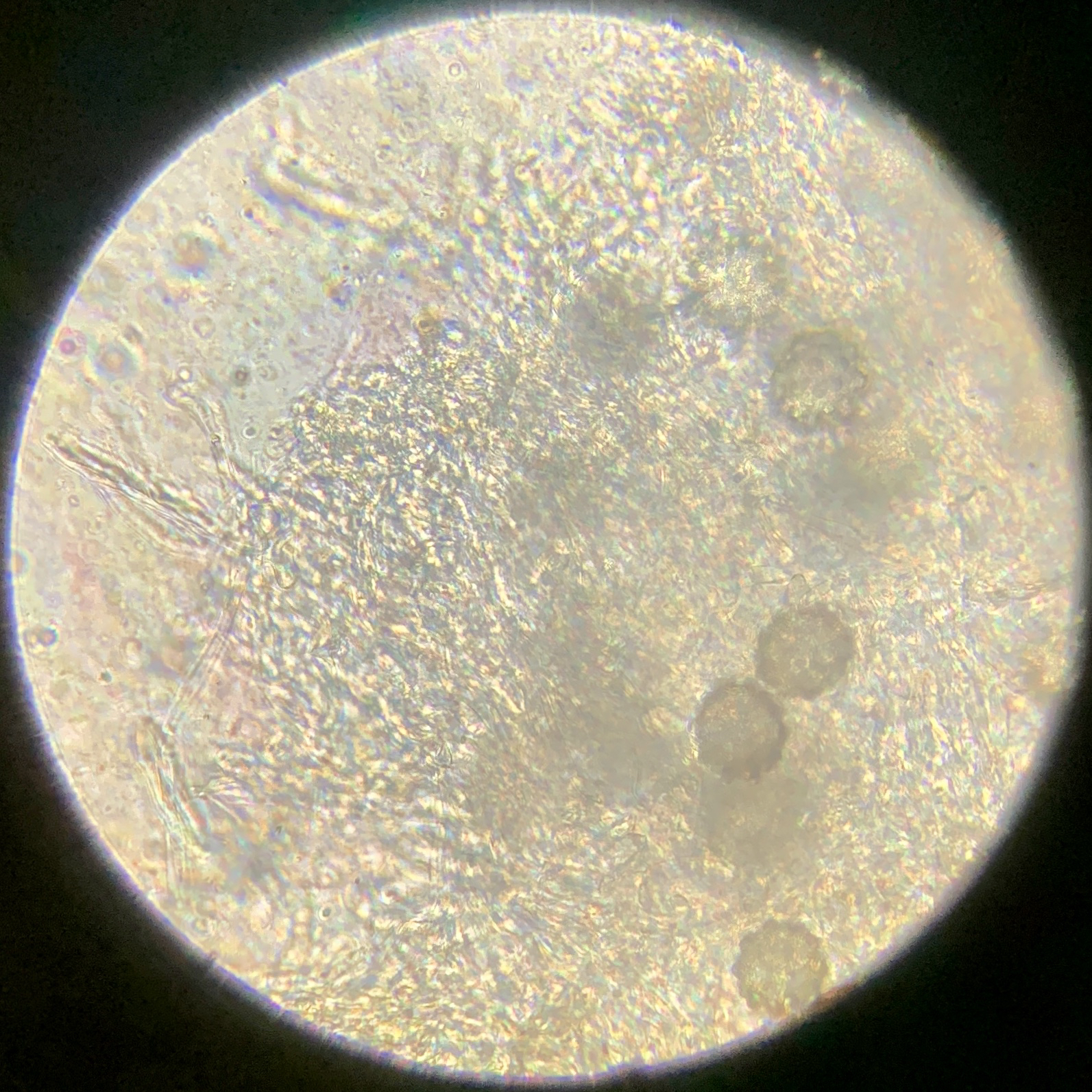
- Genea harknessii spores

Scientific classification
- Kingdom: Fungi
- Division: Ascomycota
- Class: Pezizomycetes
- Order: Pezizales
- Family: Pyronemataceae
- Genus: Genea
- Species: G. harknessii

Binomial name
- Genea harknessii Gilkey 1916

= Genea harknessii =

Species of fungus

Genea harknessii, commonly known as the dark geode truffle, is a species of fungus in the genus Genea. The species was described by Helen Gilkey in 1916.

The mature fruit is up to 2.5 centimetres (1 in) across. It has a convoluted, coral-like appearance. The exterior is dark brown (to nearly black) with a hollow interior, the surfaced of which is dark brownish. The sterile flesh between the dark interior and exterior 'skin' is white to grayish.

G. harknessii grows underground in forests, especially white oak forests, but also coniferous woods. Although pigs hunt it, its edibility to humans is unknown.
