= Phlebogaster =

Scientific classification
- Kingdom: Fungi
- Division: Basidiomycota
- Class: Agaricomycetes
- Order: Phallales
- Family: Claustulaceae
- Genus: Phlebogaster; Fogel (1980)

Type species
- Phlebogaster laurisylvicola Fogel (1980)

Species
- P. laurisylvicola; P. sinensis

Genus of fungi

Phlebogaster is a genus of truffle-like fungi in the family Claustulaceae. Circumscribed in 1980 by mycologist Robert Fogel, the genus contains two species found in the Canary Islands and Asia.
