= Gilkey =

Gilkey is an American surname. Notable people with the surname include:

- Art Gilkey (1926–1953), American geologist and mountaineer
- Bernard Gilkey (born 1966), American baseball player
- Bertha Gilkey (1949–2014), African-American activist of tenant management of public housing properties
- Garrett Gilkey (born 1990), American football offensive guard
- Gordon Gilkey (1912–2000), American artist, educator, and promoter of the arts from Oregon
- Helen Margaret Gilkey (1886–1972), American mycologist and botanist
- Howard Gilkey (1890–1972), American landscape architect
- John Charles Gilkey, book and document thief
- John Gilkey, American actor, comedian, juggler and clown
- Langdon Brown Gilkey (1919–2004), American Protestant Ecumenical theologian
- Peter B. Gilkey (born 1946), American mathematician
- Randy Gilkey (born 1976), American singer, songwriter and producer
- Richard Gilkey (1925–1997), American painter

== See also ==
- Gilkeya, a genus of fungi
