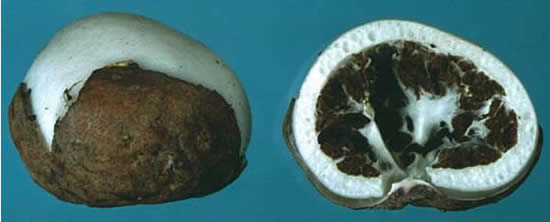
- Claustula fischeri

Scientific classification
- Kingdom: Fungi
- Division: Basidiomycota
- Class: Agaricomycetes
- Order: Phallales
- Family: Claustulaceae; G.Cunn. (1931)

Type genus
- Claustula K.M.Curtis (1926)

Genera
- Claustula; Gelopellis; Hosakaea; Kjeldsenia; Phlebogaster; Pseudogelopellis

Synonyms
- Gelopellaceae Zeller (1939)

= Claustulaceae =

Family of fungi

The Claustulaceae are a family of fungi in the Phallales order. The family contains four genera and ten species. The family was circumscribed by the mycologist Gordon Herriot Cunningham in 1939.
