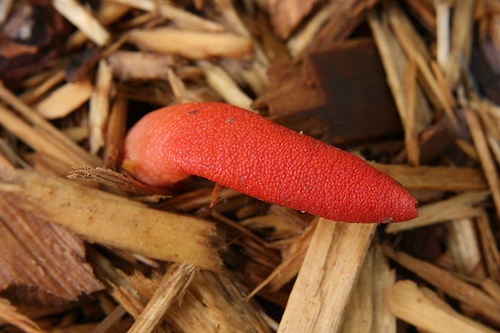

Scientific classification
- Domain: Eukaryota
- Kingdom: Fungi
- Division: Basidiomycota
- Class: Agaricomycetes
- Order: Phallales
- Family: Phallaceae
- Genus: Mutinus
- Species: M. ravenelii

Binomial name
- Mutinus ravenelii (Berk. & M.A.Curtis) E.Fisch. (1888)

Synonyms
- Corynites ravenelii Berk. & M.A.Curtis (1853); Ithyphallus ravenelii (Berk. & M.A.Curtis) E.Fisch (1886); Dictyophora ravenelii (Berk. & M.A.Curtis) Burt (1896)

= Mutinus ravenelii =

Species of fungus

Mutinus ravenelii Mycological characteristics
- Smooth hymenium
- Hymenium attachment is not applicable
- Stipe has a volva
- Spore print is blackish-brown to brown
- Ecology is saprotrophic
- Edibility is edible but not recommended

Mutinus ravenelii, or Ravenel's red stinkhorn, is a species of fungus that is often confused with M. elegans and M. caninus. M. ravenelii is a member of the Phallaceae (stinkhorn) family.

== Edibility ==
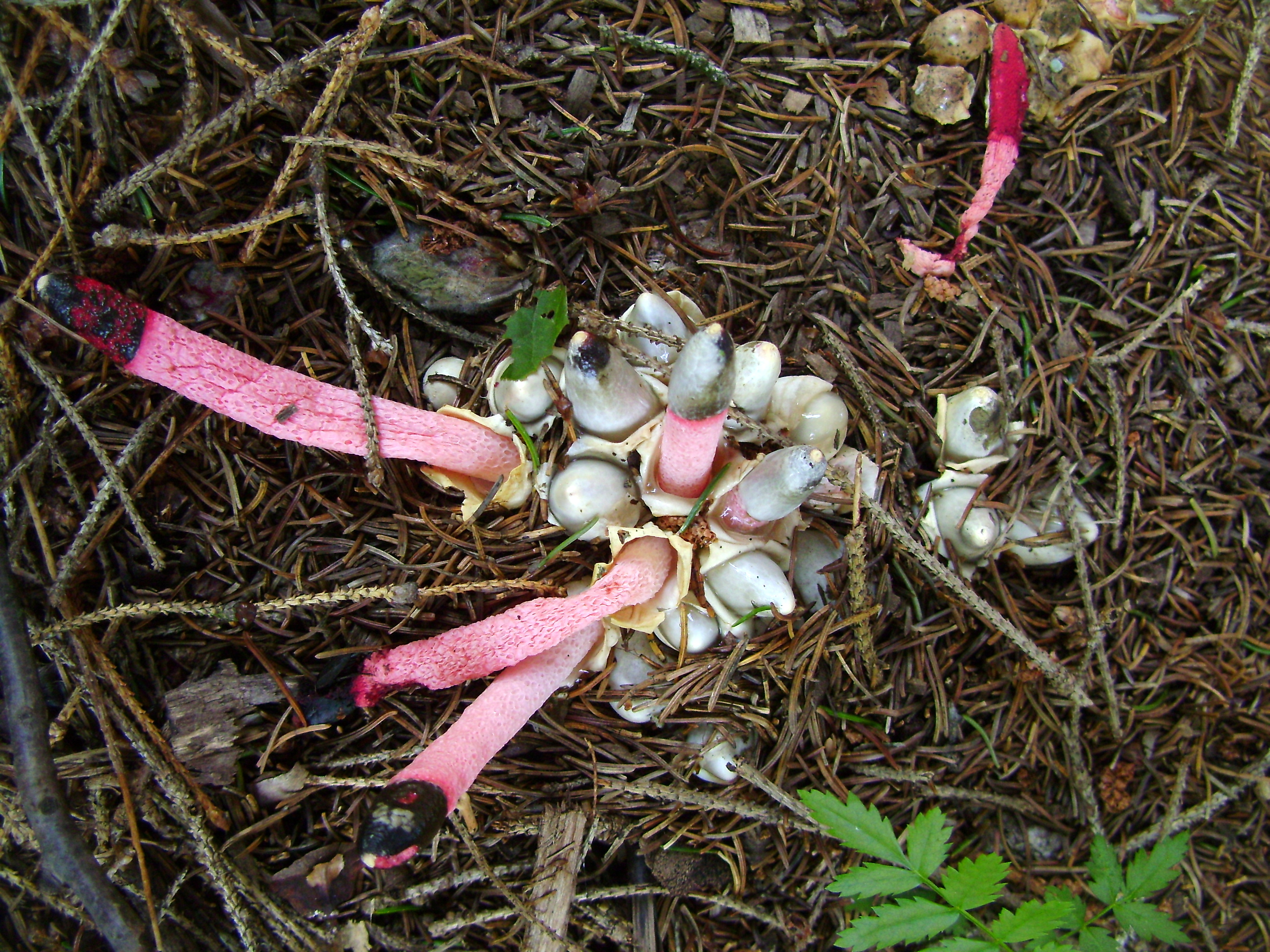
'Eggs' (white) and fertile portions (pink) of Mutinus ravenelii

The 'eggs' of Mutinus ravenelii are edible while the adult fungus itself is not yet known to be edible.
