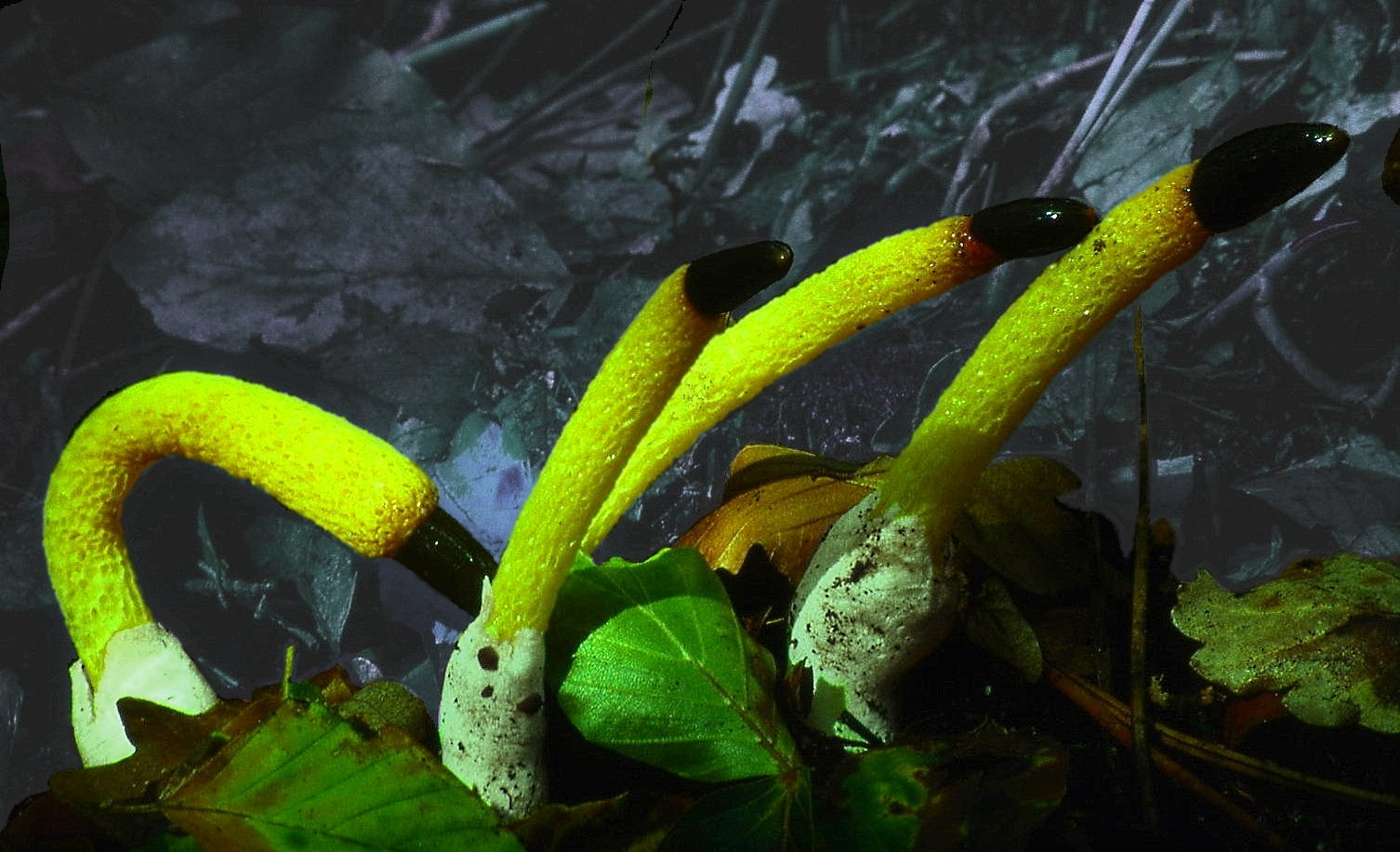
- Mutinus caninus

Scientific classification
- Kingdom: Fungi
- Division: Basidiomycota
- Class: Agaricomycetes
- Order: Phallales
- Family: Phallaceae
- Genus: Mutinus; Fr. (1849)

Type species
- Mutinus caninus (Huds.) Fr. (1849)

Synonyms
- Aedycia Raf. (1808); Ithyphallus Gray (1821); Cynophallus (Fr.) Corda (1842); Corynites Berk. & M.A.Curtis(1853); Caromyxa Mont. (1856); Floccomutinus Henn. (1895); Jansia Penz. (1899); Xylophallus (Schltdl.) E.Fisch. (1933)

= Mutinus =

Genus of fungi

Mutinus is a genus of fungi in the family Phallaceae commonly known as headless stinkhorns due to the lack of a distinct cap in stinkhorns belonging to this genus. The genus was first described by Elias Magnus Fries in 1849. According to the Dictionary of the Fungi (10th edition, 2008), the widespread genus contains 12 species.

== Species ==
- Mutinus albotruncatus
- Mutinus annulatus
- Mutinus argentinus
- Mutinus bicolor
- Mutinus boninensis
- Mutinus bovinus
- Mutinus caninus – dog stinkhorn
- Mutinus cartilagineus
- Mutinus coracoideus
- Mutinus curtisii
- Mutinus discolor
- Mutinus elegans – elegant stinkhorn
- Mutinus fleischeri
- Mutinus granulatus
- Mutinus inopinatus
- Mutinus minimus
- Mutinus muelleri
- Mutinus penzigii
- Mutinus proximus
- Mutinus ravenelii - Ravenel's red stinkhorn
- Mutinus rugulosus
- Mutinus sulcatus
- Mutinus verrucosus
- Mutinus watsonii
- Mutinus xylogenus
- Mutinus zenkeri

== Etymology ==
The genus name Mutinus was a phallic deity, Mutunus, one of the Roman di indigetes placated by Roman brides.
