= H. W. Harkness =

U.S. mycologist (1821–1901)

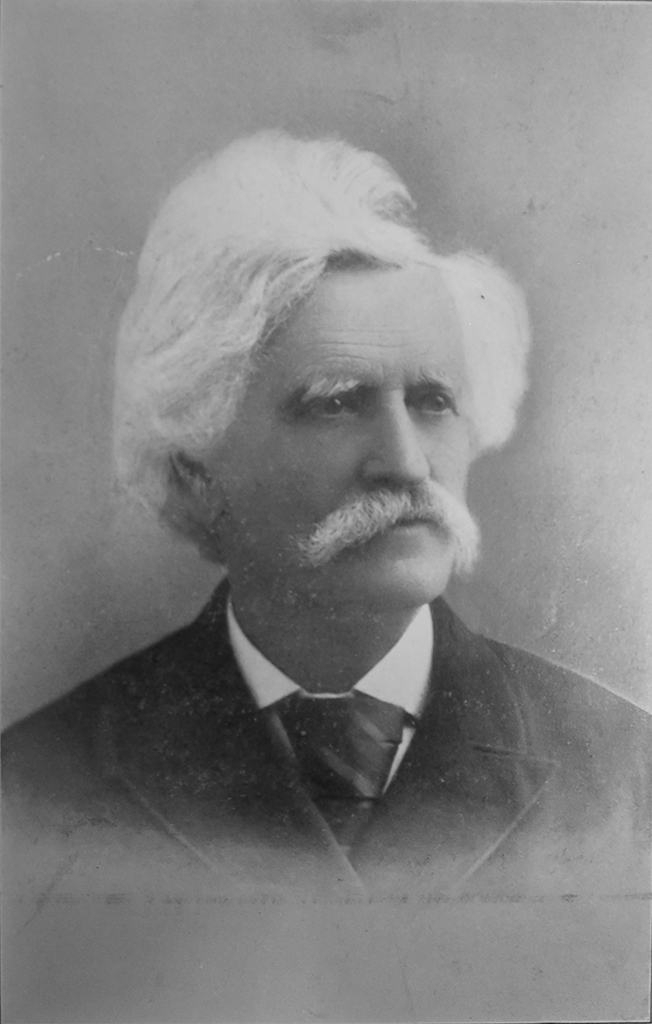
- Born: May 25, 1821; Pelham, Massachusetts
- Died: July 10, 1901 (aged 80); San Francisco, California
- Known for: Earliest cataloging of California fungal species
- Spouse: Amelia Griswold
- Scientific career
- Fields: Mycology, Natural history
- Workplaces: California Academy of Sciences
- Author abbrev. (botany): Harkn.

Harvey Willson Harkness (May 25, 1821 – July 10, 1901) was an American physician, educator, mycologist, and natural historian best known for his early descriptions of California fungal species.

== Early life ==
Harkness's parents originated from Scotland and the family lived in Pelham, Massachusetts. He was their seventh child and the only one who survived into adulthood. He studied as a medical doctor at the Berkshire Medical College in Massachusetts, graduating in 1847. He left Massachusetts for California in 1849 and joined with a group of emigrants at Rock Island, Illinois to travel there. Harkness relocated to California not only to seek his fortune during the Gold Rush, but also because he believed California would have a healthier climate than Massachusetts. He arrived in California in October 1849.

He first set up a medical practice in the mining camp at Bidwell's Bar but moved to Sacramento in 1851. He rose to prominence as physician, educator, real estate developer, and newspaper editor in Sacramento, becoming part of the social circle of early California notables such as Leland Stanford, Charles Crocker, Collis Huntington, and Mark Hopkins. His active interest in school education led to his election as the first president of the Sacramento board of education in 1853. He married Amelia Griswold in 1854. She died within a year of the marriage.

Harkness was a participant in the ceremony in May 1869 that marked the completion of the First transcontinental railroad, representing California and bearing the Golden Spike that was driven in by Leland Stanford marking the completion of the railroad. In November 1869, he was a guest at the opening of the Suez Canal in Egypt.

== Scientific career ==
Having earned a large fortune in Sacramento real estate, Harkness retired from his medical practice in 1869, devoting the remainder of his life to the study of natural sciences, especially mycology. Harkness relocated to San Francisco and was elected a member of the California Academy of Sciences in 1871, becoming vice president in 1878 and its president from 1887 to 1896. He became the academy's curator of fungi in 1896.

He devoted himself to research into the natural history of the Pacific States, publishing articles on the age of the Lassen Cinder Cone and the nature of the fossil footprints discovered near Carson City, Nevada. He also travelled internationally, visiting North Africa, Europe and the eastern USA several times.

The bulk of his research was devoted to cataloging the previously undescribed fungi of California. In the last 30 years of his life, Harkness authored or coauthored a number of papers and books on California fungi (especially truffles), ranging from simple species lists to a detailed monograph of California hypogeous fungi. These included the important early work co-authored with Justin P. Moore in 1880, Catalogue of the Pacific Coast Fungi (published by the California Academy of Sciences). The catalogue was first read on February 2, 1880, at a meeting of the California Academy of Sciences and later published in a 46-page pamphlet describing nearly 900 species with localities and habitats indicated for most of the species.

Harkness collected, exchanged or purchased over 10,000 specimens of fungi, including many type specimens, that were donated to the California Academy of Sciences in 1891. Many of these collections were destroyed during the 1906 San Francisco earthquake and fire, though some 480 of his type collections were rescued due to the personal intervention of Alice Eastwood. These collections were later transferred to the U.S. National Fungus Collections in Beltsville, Maryland when California Academy of Sciences herbarium divested itself of its fungal collections late in the 20th century.

== Legacy ==
- Harkness and his correspondents described scores of fungal species that were new to science. His 1899 monograph, Californian Hypogæous Fungi, alone described some 55 new species of hypogeous fungi.
- The phytopathogenic ascomycete genus Harknessia M.C. Cooke and the monotypic genus Harknessiella purpurea P.A. Saccardo are named for him, as are the names of fungal species in 20 genera (including Cronartium harknessii and Genea harknessii) as well as several species of vascular plants, including Leptosiphon harknessii. Many of the fungi and plants named for Harkness were described from specimens originally collected by him, but described taxonomically by other authors.
- Mount Harkness, a volcanic peak near Lassen Peak, is named for him.
- There is an H. W. Harkness Elementary School in Sacramento, California, commemorating his role as first Superintendent of Schools for Sacramento.
- Harkness Street in Sacramento, between 17th and 18th Streets, lies within the 90 acres of land on the southwest corner of what is now Broadway Ave and Freeport Blvd that Harkness owned.

== See also ==
- Category:Taxa named by H. W. Harkness
