= Mutunus Tutunus =

Ancient Roman phallic marriage deity

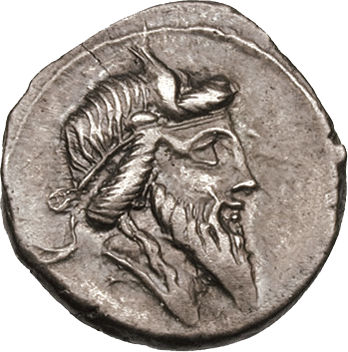
A denarius issued by Quintus Titius, thought to depict a bearded Mutunus Tutunus

In ancient Roman religion, Mutunus Tutunus or Mutinus Titinus was a phallic marriage deity, in some respects equated with Priapus. His shrine was located on the Velian Hill, supposedly since the founding of Rome, until the 1st century BC.

During preliminary marriage rites, Roman brides are supposed to have straddled the phallus of Mutunus to prepare themselves for intercourse, according to Church Fathers who interpreted this act as an obscene loss of virginity. The Christian apologist Arnobius says that Roman matrons were taken for a ride (inequitare) on Tutunus's "awful phallus" with its "immense shameful parts", but other sources specify that it is brides who learned through the ritual not to be embarrassed by sex: "Tutinus, upon whose shameful lap sit brides, so that the god seems to sample their shame before the fact." The 2nd-century grammarian Festus is the only classical Latin source to take note of the god, and the characterization of the rite by Christian sources is likely to be hostile or biased.

== Etymology ==
Unlike Priapus, who is depicted in human form with an outsized erection, Mutunus seems to have been embodied purely by the phallus, like the fascinus or the mysterious begetter of Servius Tullius. The god's name is related to two infrequently recorded slang words for penis in Latin, mūtō (or muttō) and mūtōnium. "Mutto" was also used as a cognomen, the third of the three elements of a Roman man's name. Lucilius offers the earliest recorded instance of both forms: at laeva lacrimas muttoni absterget amica ("A girlfriend wipes away Mutto's tears — his left hand, that is"), and the derivative mūtōnium. Mūtōnium may have replaced the earlier form, as it appears later among the graffiti of Pompeii. Horace has a dialogue with his muttō: "What do you want? Surely you're not demanding a grand consul's granddaughter as a cunt?" Both Lucilius and Horace thus personify the muttō. Mutūniātus, used by Martial and in the Corpus Priapeorum, describes a "well-endowed" male.

Both parts of the name Mūtūnus Tūtūnus are reduplicative, Tītīnus perhaps from tītus, another slang word for "penis."

MT in Budge's dictionary

It is also possible, if not probable, that Latin "mut" was a vowelized loan derivative of the consonantal Egyptian word MT for 'phallus, male, man' in the adjacent hieroglyph, considering that Egyptian scribes did not vowelize MT, and that Budge added an /e/ to MT in his dictionary to make it pronounceable.

== Cult ==
The shrine of Mutunus Tutunus on the Velia has not been located. According to Festus, it was destroyed to make a private bath for the pontifex and Augustan supporter Domitius Calvinus, even though it was revered as among the most ancient landmarks.

This uprooting raises the question of why Calvinus was permitted to displace such a venerable shrine. The Church Fathers associate Mutunus with groupings of other deities that are assumed to be based on the lost theological works of Varro. Through examining these connections, Robert Palmer concluded that the old cult of Mutunus was merged with that of Father Liber, who was variously identified with or shared attributes with Jupiter, Bacchus, and Lampsacene Priapus. Palmer further conjectured that it was Mutunus, in the form of Liber, to whom Julius Caesar made sacrifice on the day of his assassination, receiving the ill omens that the conspirator Decimus Brutus urged him to ignore. Caesar had previously celebrated his victory at the Battle of Munda on the Liberalia, or festival of Liber held March 17, and he visited the house of the pontifex Calvinus on the Ides of March, near the archaic shrine of Mutunus-Liber. In Palmer's view, the evident ill favor of the god gave Augustus license to reform the cult during his program of religious revivalism that often disguised radical innovations. The god was then Hellenized as Bacchus Lyaeus.

Palmer concurred with numismatists who regard a denarius minted by Quintus Titius, moneyer ca. 90–88 BC, as picturing an aged and bearded Mutunus on its obverse. The winged diadem is a reference to the Priapus of Lampsacus and to the winged phallus as a common motif in Roman decorative arts, which can also serve as an apotropaic charm against the evil eye. Another issue by Titius pictures an ivy-crowned Bacchus, with both denarii having a virtually identical Pegasus on the reverse. Michael Crawford finds "no good grounds" for identifying this figure as Mutunus, but Palmer points to the shared iconography of the Bacchus–Liber–Priapus figure and the associative etymology of the gens name Titius. A titus ("penis") with wings was a visual pun, since the word also referred to a type of bird. Varro seems to have associated Titinus with the Titii, in an etymological collocation that included Titus Tatius, the royal Sabine contemporary of Romulus; the Curia Titia; or the tribus of the Titienses, one of the three original tribes of Rome.

== See also ==
- List of Roman fertility deities
