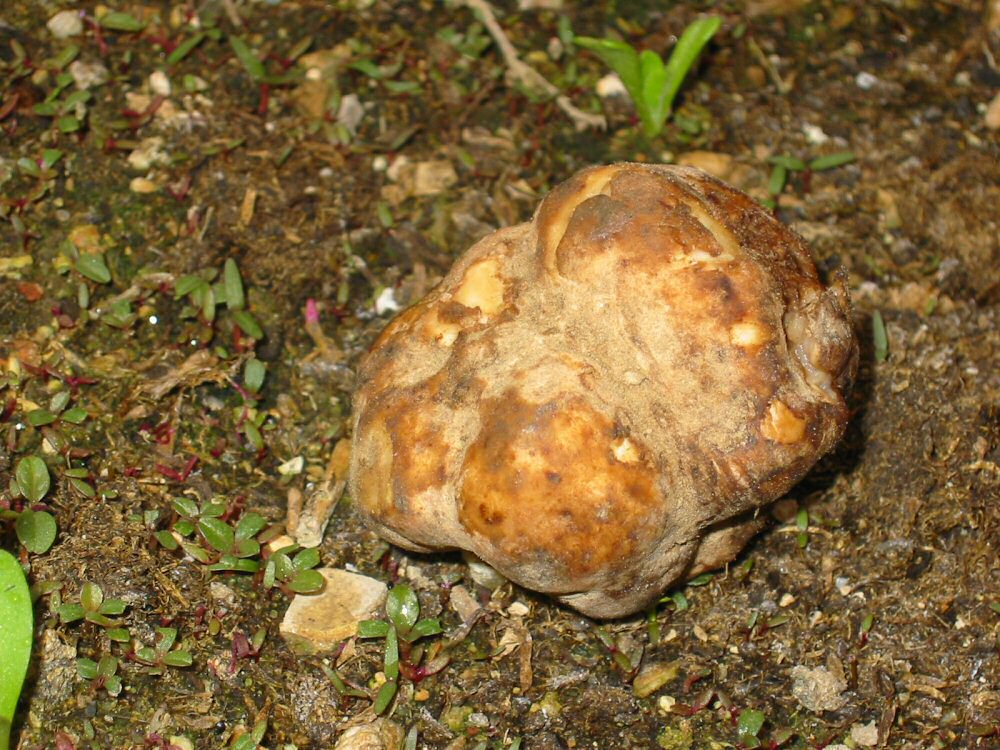
- Desert truffle (Terfezia spp.) from Avanos, Turkey

Scientific classification
- Kingdom: Fungi
- Division: Ascomycota
- Class: Pezizomycetes
- Order: Pezizales
- Family: Terfeziaceae; Dumort. 1829

Genera
- (see text)

= Terfeziaceae =

Family of fungi

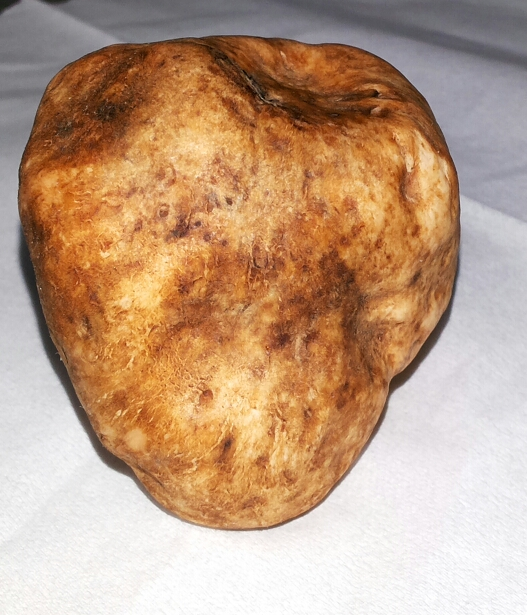
Desert truffle, from Yamchi, Iran

The Terfeziaceae, or desert truffles, is a family of truffles (Berber languages: Tirfas, Arabic: كمأ, romanized: Kam', Turkish: Domalan, Kurdish: دۆمبەڵان, romanized: Dombelan, Hebrew: כמהת הנגב, romanized: kmehat hanegev). The group consists of three genera: Terfezia, Tirmania, and Mattirolomyces. They are a few centimetres across and weigh from 30 to 300 grams (1–10 oz).

The family is endemic to arid and semi-arid areas of the Mediterranean Region, North Africa, and the Middle East, where its members live in ectomycorrhizal association with Helianthemum species and other ectomycorrhizal plants (including Cistus, oaks, and pines). Desert truffles are often used as a culinary ingredient.

== Description ==
Fruit-bodies (ascomata) are large, more or less spherical to turbinate (top-shaped), thick-walled, and solid. The asci are formed in marbled veins interspersed with sterile tissue. The asci are cylindrical to spherical, indehiscent (not splitting open at maturity), and sometimes stain blue in iodine. Ascospores are hyaline to pale brown, spherical, and uninucleate.

== Genera ==
According to BioLib, Terfeziaceae contains the following genera:

- Adelphella Pfister, Matocec & I. Kušan
- Amylascus Trappe
- Boudiera Cooke
- Calongea Healy, Bonito & Trappe
- Cazia Trappe
- Chromelosporium Corda
- Cleistoiodophanus J.L. Bezerra & Kimbr.
- Daleomyces Setch.
- Eremiomyces Trappe & Kagan-Zur
- Galactinia (Cooke) Boud.
- Glischroderma Fuckel
- Hapsidomyces J.C. Krug & Jeng
- Hydnobolites Tul. & C. Tul.
- Hydnotryopsis Gilkey
- Iodophanus Korf
- Iodowynnea Medel, Guzmán & S. Chacón
- Kalaharituber Trappe & Kagan-Zur
- Kimbropezia Korf & W.Y. Zhuang
- Malvipezia Van Vooren
- Marcelleina Brumm., Korf & Rifai
- Mattirolomyces E. Fisch.
- Muciturbo P.H.B. Talbot
- Mycoclelandia Trappe & G.W. Beaton
- Ostracoderma Fr.
- Pachyella Boud.
- Pachyphloeus Tul. & C. Tul.
- Peziza Dill. ex Fr.
- Plicaria Fuckel
- Plicariella (Sacc.) Rehm
- Rhodopeziza Hohmeyer & J. Moravec
- Ruhlandiella Henn.
- Sarcosphaera Auersw.
- Sphaerozone Zobel
- Stouffera Kovács, Trappe
- Svrcekia Kubička
- Temperantia K. Hansen, Healy & Kovács
- Terfezia (Tul. & C. Tul.) Tul. & C. Tul.
- Tirmania Chatin
- Ulurua Trappe, Claridge & Kovács

== Distribution and habitat ==
Desert truffles have been found in arid and semi-arid zones of the Kalahari Desert, the Mediterranean basin, Syria, Azerbaijan, Iran, Iraq, Kuwait, the Negev desert in Israel, the Sahara, Saudi Arabia, Qatar, Libya, Spain, Greece, Cyprus, Hungary, Croatia, and China. As the name suggests, they predominantly grow in the desert. They can be formed near Sunrose (Helianthemum) plants, but they are very rare to find and cannot be cultivated (justifying their cost).

== Price ==
Desert truffles do not have the same flavor as European truffles, but tend to be more common and thus more affordable. Forest truffles (genus Tuber) typically cost $1,000 per kilogram; Italian truffles may sell for up to $2,200 per kg, while Terfezia truffles sold as of 2002 in Riyadh for $200 to $305 a kg, and in recent years have reached, but not yet exceeded, $570. Israeli agricultural scientists have been attempting to domesticate Terfezia boudieri into a commercial crop.

== Names ==
Desert truffles go by several different names. In Iran and Azerbaijan they are called Donbalan or Dombal. In Turkish they are called Domalan in Turkiye, also Keme on the Syrian-Turkiye border. In Algeria and Tunisia they are called terfez; the Bedouin of the Western Desert call them terfas ترفاس. The Kuwaitis call them fagga فقع, the Saudis faq'h فقع, and in Syria, and in Libya terfase ترفاس; they are known by their classical Arabic name, kamaa كمأ. Iraqis call them kamaa, kima or chima كمأ, depending on local dialects and in Oman they are faqah فقع. The Hebrew word is kmehin כמהין (kmeha in singular). In Catalonia they are known as tòfones d'arenal and turmes. In southern Spain, they are known as turmas or criadillas and in the Canary Islands they are known as papas crias. In Botswana they are called mahupu. In Hungary they are known as homoki szarvasgomba ('sand truffles') and are sold to English-speaking nations as honey truffles.

In Saudi Arabia, there are two varieties; khalasi are oval with a black skin and a pinkish-ivory interior, and zubaidi have a cream colour but are generally more expensive.

In oceanic countries, there is some confusion regarding the desert truffle, as the yam is often referred to as the common desert truffle as well.
