= Ruhlandiella =

Scientific classification
- Kingdom: Fungi
- Division: Ascomycota
- Class: Pezizomycetes
- Order: Pezizales
- Family: Pezizaceae
- Genus: Ruhlandiella; Henn.

Type species
- Ruhlandiella berolinensis Henn.

Genus of fungi

Ruhlandiella is a genus of fungi within the family Pezizaceae. Ruhlandiella species are exothecial hypogeous fungi, which are essentially truffles that lack the outer layer or peridium. Ruhlandiella species are widely distributed in Nothofagaceae forests in South America and near Eucalyptus or Melaleuca plants in Australia, North America, and Europe.

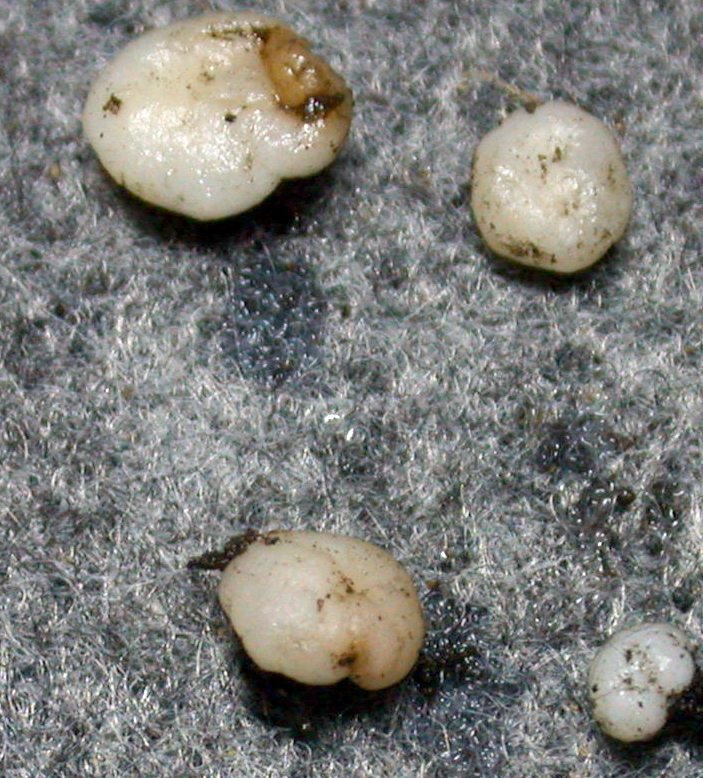
Ruhlandiella patagonica ascocarps

== Species ==
Currently, there are seven accepted species of Ruhlandiella.

- Ruhlandiella berolinensis Henn. 1903
- Ruhlandiella lophozoniae Kraisit., Pfister, Healy & M.E. Sm. 2019
- Ruhlandiella patagonica Kraisit., Pfister, Healy & M.E. Sm. 2019
- Ruhlandiella peregrina Lantieri & Pfister 2011
- Ruhlandiella reticulata (P.H.B. Talbot) E. Rubio, R. Tena, Ormad & A. Suárez 2010
- Ruhlandiella truncata (P.H.B. Talbot) E. Rubio, R. Tena, Ormad & A. Suárez 2010
- Ruhlandiella verrucosa (P.H.B. Talbot) Kraisit., Pfister, Healy & M.E. Sm. 2019

== Distribution ==
Ruhlandiella species have been found several continents across the globe. There are records of Ruhlandiella fungi from Argentina, Australia, Canary Islands, Chile, Italy, and United States (California). Ruhlandiella patagonica is the most common species in Patagonia, whereas R. lophozoniae is apparently rare. Ruhlandiella berolinensis has been found in Europe and North America. This could be a result of the import of Eucalyptus plants from Australia.

== Taxonomy ==
The genus was circumscribed in Hedwigia vol.42 on page 22 in 1903.

The genus name of Ruhlandiella is in honour of Wilhelm Otto Eugen Ruhland (1878–1960), who was a German botanist, who worked firstly between 1899 and 1911 at the Berlin Botanical Garden and Botanical Museum.

Ruhlandiella was originally a monotypic genus, first described by Paul Christoph Hennings in 1903, based on a single species: R. berolinensis. His collections were made in a Berlin botanical greenhouse which contained Eucalyptus plants from Australia. In 1989, Warcup and Talbot described a new genus: Muciturbo with 3 species: M. reticulatus, M. truncatus, and M. verrucosus, from New South Wales. However, Rubio et al. (2010) recognized the strong morphological similarities between the two genera, and thus transferred M. reticulatus and M. truncatus to the genus Ruhlandiella, as Ruhlandiella reticulata and Ruhlandiella truncata. Not long after, another species was described from Italy as Ruhlandiella peregrina. Note that all these previous species were described either from Australia or Europe. In 2019, researchers from the University of Florida College of Agricultural and Life Sciences described two more species of Ruhlandiella discovered from deep Patagonian forests in South America (Chile and Argentina). These new species are Ruhlandiella patagonica and Ruhlandiella lophozoniae. Additional taxa, such as Sphaerosoma fuscescens and Boudiera parvispora, were also thought to be Ruhlandiella species. Further morphological analysis suggests that these two species do not belong to the genus Ruhlandiella.

== Morphology ==
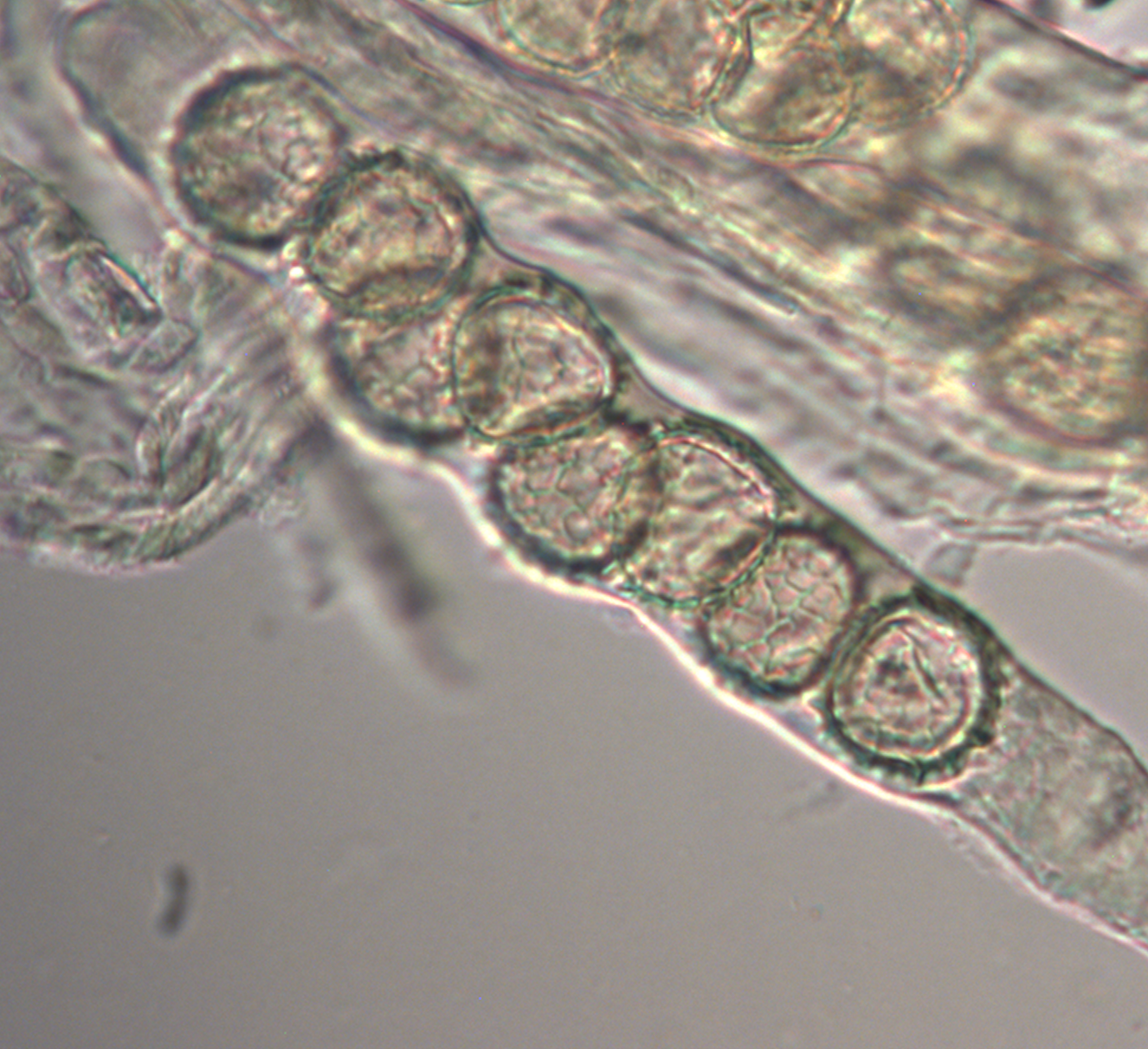
Ascus of R. patagonica containing reticulate ascospores

Ruhlandiella species are characterized by their exothecial ascocarp, highly ornamented ascospores, and paraphyses covered with gelatinous sheathes that greatly exceed asci in length. The color of ascocarp varies ranging from white to brownish lilac, but typically becomes black with age or when exposed. Asci of Ruhlandiella do not contain opercula and range from 180 to 430 μm in length. The ascospores are hyaline, globose, and range from 15 to 39 μm in diameter. The spore ornamentation is reticulate in all species except for R. truncata and R. verrucosa which have truncate ascospores.

== Systematics and evolution ==
The genus Ruhlandiella is a member the family Pezizaceae which includes many genera such as Peziza, Tirmania, and Amylascus. Recent phylogenetic analyses revealed that Ruhlandiella is composed of two biogeographically defined clades: Australasian and South American. The Australasian clade comprises Ruhlandiella berolinensis, Ruhlandiella reticulata, Ruhlandiella truncata, Ruhlandiella peregrina, and potentially Ruhlandiella verrucosa. The South American clade comprises Ruhlandiella patagonica and Ruhlandiella lophozoniae. It was suggested that the diversification of Ruhlandiella could be a result of the separation of Gondwana, which occurred roughly 135 million years ago.

== Ecology ==
Not much is known regarding the ecological roles of Ruhlandiella fungi. From 1990 to 2018, Ruhlandiella species were thought to be ectomycorrhizal fungi, associated only with Eucalyptus, Melaleuca or members of the family Myrtaceae. Recently, researchers have shown that Ruhlandiella patagonica forms ectomycorrhizal association with Lophozonia obliqua and Nothofagus pumilio (Nothofagaceae) and may help with seedling establishment of these trees. Furthermore, because the fruiting bodies of R. patagonica look like snail eggs, it has been hypothesized that ground feeding birds might act as long-distance dispersal agents for these truffles.
