= Peziza granulosa =

Scientific classification
- Kingdom: Fungi
- Division: Ascomycota
- Class: Pezizomycetes
- Order: Pezizales
- Family: Pezizaceae
- Genus: Peziza
- Species: P. granulosa

Binomial name
- Peziza granulosa Schumach., 1803

Species of fungus

Peziza granulosa is a species of apothecial fungus belonging to the family Pezizaceae. This is a European species, appearing as small pale-coloured cups up to 3 cm in diameter in various upland habitats from late spring to early autumn.
