= Lepidotia =

Scientific classification
- Domain: Eukaryota
- Kingdom: Fungi
- Division: Ascomycota
- Class: Pezizomycetes
- Order: Pezizales
- Family: Pezizaceae
- Genus: Lepidotia; Boud.

Genus of fungi

Lepidotia is a genus of fungi within the Pezizaceae family.
