= Pachyphloeus depressus =

Scientific classification
- Kingdom: Fungi
- Division: Ascomycota
- Class: Pezizomycetes
- Order: Pezizales
- Family: Pezizaceae
- Genus: Pachyphlodes
- Species: P. depressus

Binomial name
- Pachyphlodes depressus L.Fan (2015)

Species of fungus

Pachyphloeus depressus is a species of ascomycete fungus that forms truffle-like fruitbodies. It is found in southwestern China, where it has been reported from Qiaojia County, Yunnan Province, and Huili County, Sichuan Province. These counties are both near the Jinsha River. Fruitbodies of the fungus are smooth and greenish-brown—distinctive features in the genus Pachyphloeus. They measure 0.9–2.1 cm (0.4–0.8 in) in diameter, and have a rubbery texture. When ripe, the odor of the flesh is similar to burned potatoes. Spores are spherical, measuring 15.7–20 μm with coarse rod-like spines up to 2.5 μm on the surface. The fungus has been called the "green female truffle" because of its superficial resemblance to the locally common species Tuber pseudohimalayense.
