= Peziza ampelina =

Scientific classification
- Kingdom: Fungi
- Division: Ascomycota
- Class: Pezizomycetes
- Order: Pezizales
- Family: Pezizaceae
- Genus: Peziza
- Species: P. ampelina

Binomial name
- Peziza ampelina Passerini, 1874

Species of fungus

Peziza ampelina is a species of apothecial fungus belonging to the family Pezizaceae. This European fungus appears as violet-coloured cups up to 5 cm across on soil or burnt wood. The spores are quite large, with a smooth surface, unusual for the genus.
