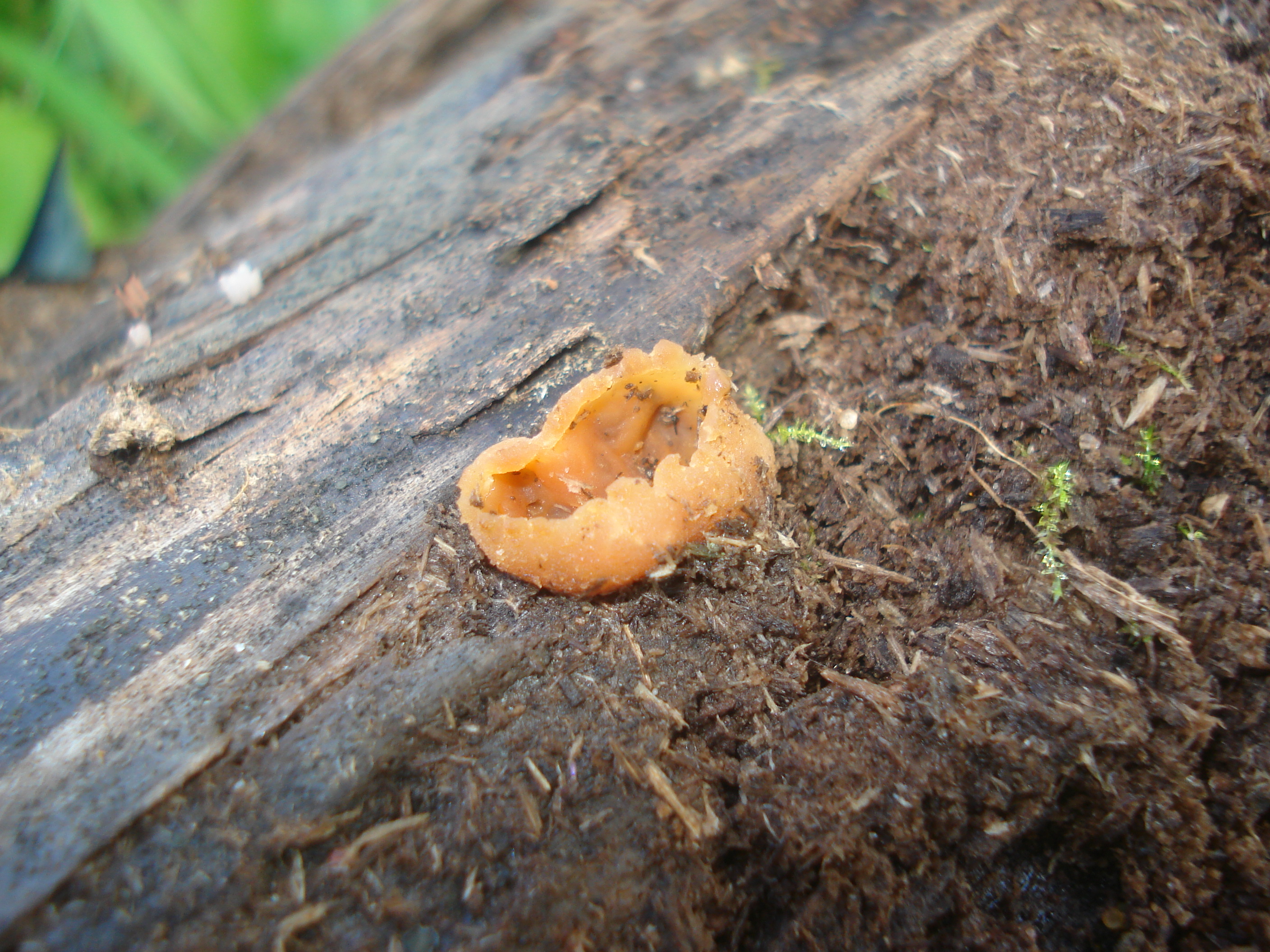

Scientific classification
- Domain: Eukaryota
- Kingdom: Fungi
- Division: Ascomycota
- Class: Pezizomycetes
- Order: Pezizales
- Family: Pezizaceae
- Genus: Peziza
- Species: P. micropus

Binomial name
- Peziza micropus Pers. (1800)

= Peziza micropus =

Species of fungus

Peziza micropus is a species of apothecial fungus belonging to the family Pezizaceae. This European fungus is found on rotting wood, especially beech and elm and tends to thrive in the aftermath of outbreaks of Dutch elm disease. The ascocarps are irregular pale brown saucers up to 5 cm (2.0 in) in diameter, appearing from summer to autumn.
