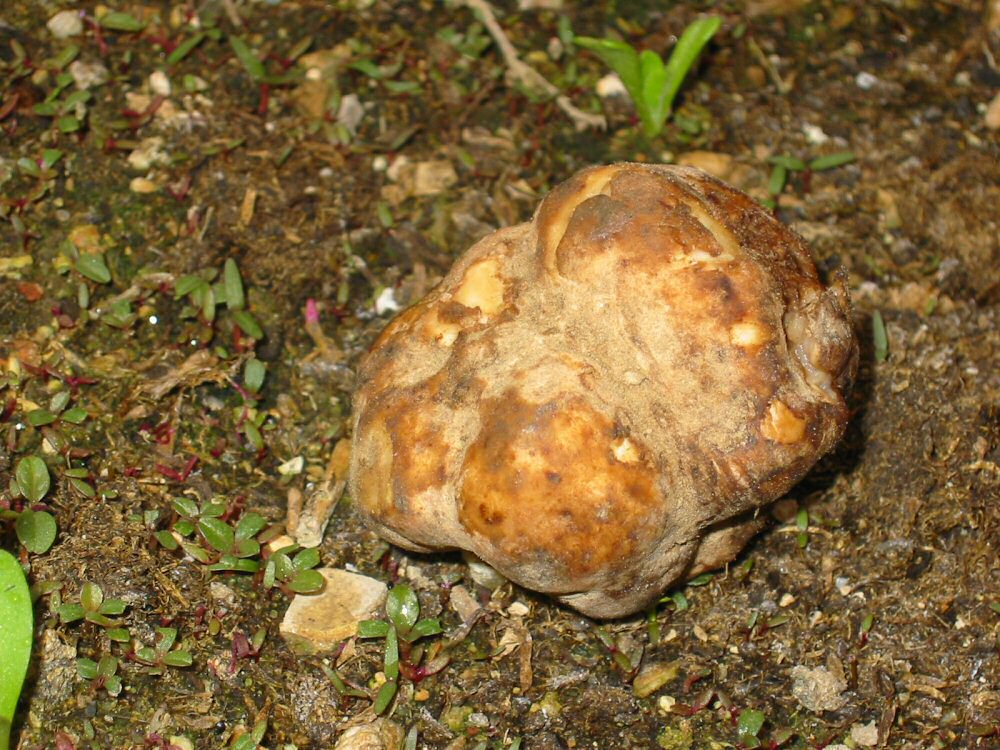
- Terfezia sp.

Scientific classification
- Kingdom: Fungi
- Division: Ascomycota
- Class: Pezizomycetes
- Order: Pezizales
- Family: Pezizaceae
- Genus: Terfezia (Tul. & C.Tul.) Tul. & C.Tul. (1851)

Type species
- Terfezia arenaria (Moris) Trappe (1971)

Species
- 34, see text

Synonyms
- Choiromyces sect. Terfezia Tul. & C.Tul. (1845); Tulasneinia Zobel (1854)

= Terfezia =

Genus of fungi

Terfezia (Berber: Tirfas) is a genus of truffle-like fungi within the Pezizaceae family. Terfezia species are commonly known as desert truffles.

== Taxonomy ==
Some authorities consider this the type genus of the family Terfeziaceae, although phylogenetic analysis suggests that it nests within the Pezizaceae. The Dictionary of the Fungi (10th edition, 2008) suggests that the genus contains 12 species. A recent (2011) publication used molecular analysis to show that the American Terfezia species had been incorrectly classified, and moved Terfezia spinosa and Terfezia longii to Mattirolomyces and Stouffera, respectively; as a result, no Terfezia species are known to exist in North America.

== Cultivation ==
Israeli agricultural scientists have been attempting to domesticate T. boudieri into a commercial crop. The host plant of Terfezia boudieri, Helianthemum sessiliflorum, has slim, dark leaves and twigs bearing small yellow flowers.

== Species ==
As of December 2015, Index Fungorum accepts 34 species in Terfezia:

- Terfezia albida
- Terfezia alsheikhii
- Terfezia aphroditis
- Terfezia arenaria
- Terfezia berberiodora
- Terfezia boudieri
- Terfezia cadevalli
- Terfezia canariensis
- Terfezia castanea
- Terfezia claveryi
- Terfezia decaryi
- Terfezia deflersii
- Terfezia eliocrocae
- Terfezia eremita
- Terfezia extremadurensis
- Terfezia fanfani
- Terfezia hafizi
- Terfezia hanotauxii
- Terfezia hispanica
- Terfezia indica
- Terfezia leptoderma
- Terfezia lutescens
- Terfezia magnusii
- Terfezia mellerionis
- Terfezia metaxasi
- Terfezia olbiensis
- Terfezia ovalispora
- Terfezia pallida
- Terfezia pini
- Terfezia pseudoleptoderma
- Terfezia rosea
- Terfezia schweinfurthii
- Terfezia sinuosa
- Terfezia transcaucasica
- Terfezia zeynebiae
