= Imaia =

Scientific classification
- Kingdom: Fungi
- Division: Ascomycota
- Class: Pezizomycetes
- Order: Pezizales
- Family: Morchellaceae
- Genus: Imaia; Trappe & Kovács (2008)

Type species
- Imaia gigantea (S.Imai) Trappe & Kovács (2008)

Synonyms
- Terfezia gigantea S.Imai (1933); Picoa pachyascus M.Lange (1956)

Genus of fungi

Imaia is a fungal genus in the family Morchellaceae found in Japan and in the Appalachian Mountains of the US.

== Taxonomy ==
A monotypic genus, Imaia was circumscribed in 2008 by James Martin Trappe and Gábor M. Kovácsto to contain the truffle-like species formerly known as Terfezia gigantea when molecular analysis demonstrated that its DNA sequences were markedly different from those of Terfezia.

The generic name Imaia honors Japanese mycologist Sanshi Imai (1900–1976), who collected the type specimen, while the specific epithet gigantea alludes to the large size of the specimens in the type collection, one of which measured 10 by 15 centimetres (4 by 6 inches).

== Description ==
The fruit bodies of Imaia gigantea are spherical to roughly elliptical to irregular in shape, brown, and usually develop cracks in age. The interior gleba comprises brown pockets of asci separated by white veins. The spores are spherical or nearly so, up to 70 μm long, and enclosed by a thick epispore.
