= Sphaerozone =

Scientific classification
- Kingdom: Fungi
- Division: Ascomycota
- Class: Pezizomycetes
- Order: Pezizales
- Family: Pezizaceae
- Genus: Sphaerozone; Zobel

Type species
- Sphaerozone tulasnei Zobel

Genus of fungi

Sphaerozone is a genus of fungi within the Pezizaceae family.
