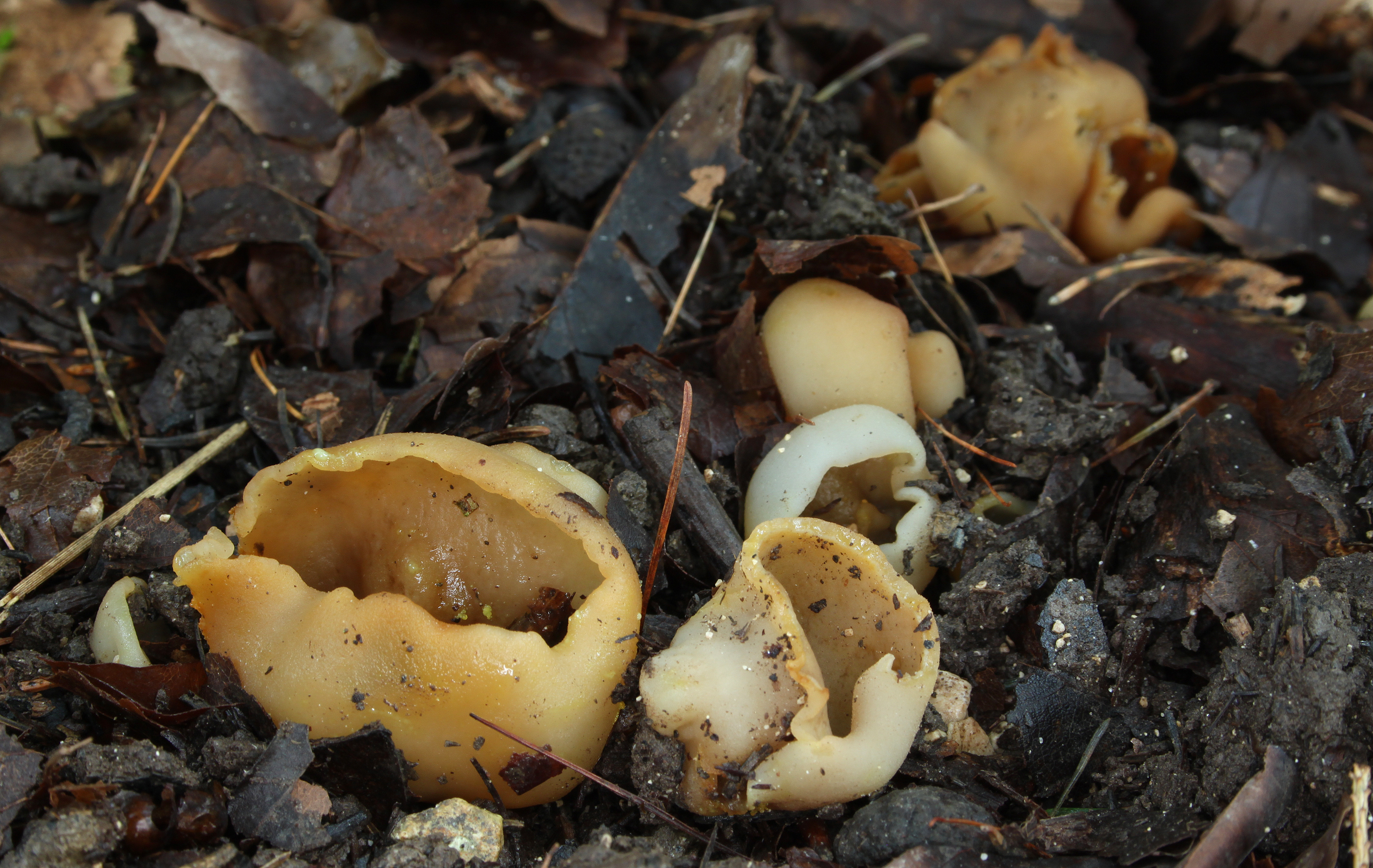

Scientific classification
- Domain: Eukaryota
- Kingdom: Fungi
- Division: Ascomycota
- Class: Pezizomycetes
- Order: Pezizales
- Family: Pezizaceae
- Genus: Peziza
- Species: P. succosa

Binomial name
- Peziza succosa Berk. (1841)

= Peziza succosa =

Species of fungus

Peziza succosa is a species of apothecial fungus belonging to the family Pezizaceae. It grows in woods in Europe, Iceland, Israel, China, Argentina, and the United States. In Europe this fungus appears in summer and autumn as grey or brown saucers up to 10 cm (3.9 in) in diameter on soil in woodland, often at pathsides. In the United States, this type of cup fungi may also be found on decaying deciduous wood. It is inedible.
