= Mycoclelandia =

Scientific classification
- Kingdom: Fungi
- Division: Ascomycota
- Class: Pezizomycetes
- Order: Pezizales
- Family: Pezizaceae
- Genus: Mycoclelandia; Trappe & G.W.Beaton

Type species
- Mycoclelandia arenacea (Trappe) Trappe & G.W.Beaton

Genus of fungi

Mycoclelandia is a genus of fungi within the Pezizaceae family.
