= Peziza moseri =

Scientific classification
- Kingdom: Fungi
- Division: Ascomycota
- Class: Pezizomycetes
- Order: Pezizales
- Family: Pezizaceae
- Genus: Peziza
- Species: P. moseri

Binomial name
- Peziza moseri Aviz.-Hersh. & Nemlich (1974)

Synonyms
- Aleuria lilacina Boud. (1907); Humaria lilacina (Boud.) Sacc. & Traverso (1910); Peziza lilacina (Boud.) Sacc. & Traverso (1911)

Species of fungus

Peziza moseri is a species of cup fungus belonging to the family Pezizaceae. It was officially described as new to science in 1974 from collections made in Israel. Fruit bodies are purple and cup-shaped, measuring 1–3 cm (0.4–1.2 in) in diameter. It fruits singly or in groups on burnt ground in coniferous forests.
