= Peziza echinospora =

Scientific classification
- Domain: Eukaryota
- Kingdom: Fungi
- Division: Ascomycota
- Class: Pezizomycetes
- Order: Pezizales
- Family: Pezizaceae
- Genus: Peziza
- Species: P. echinospora

Binomial name
- Peziza echinospora P. Karst., 1866

Species of fungus

Peziza echinospora is a species of apothecial fungus belonging to the family Pezizaceae. This European fungus is found at old fire sites, appearing from late spring to early autumn as cups up to 10 cm in diameter. The inner surface is dark brown and smooth while the outer surface is pale, sometimes almost white, and rough.
