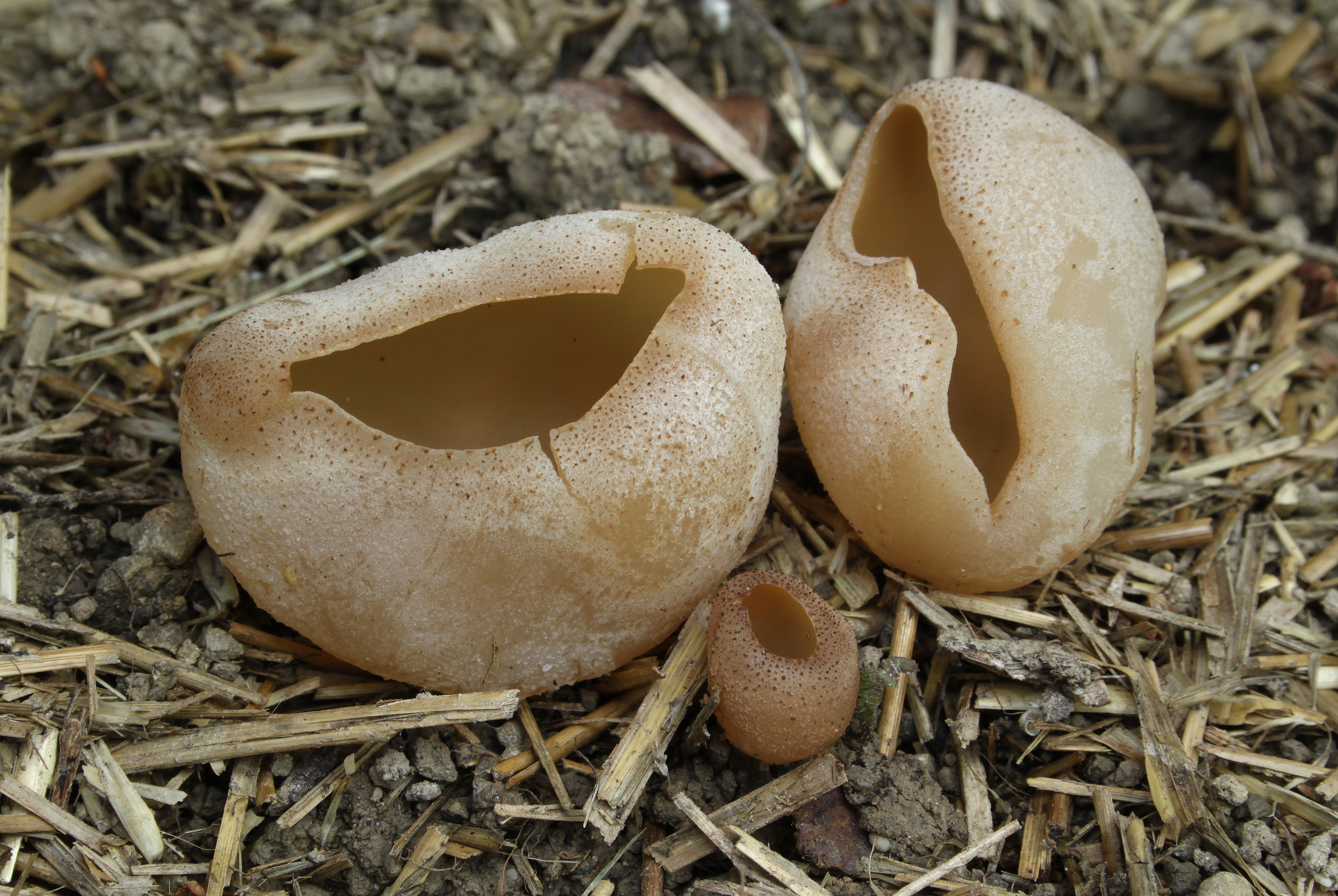

Scientific classification
- Kingdom: Fungi
- Division: Ascomycota
- Class: Pezizomycetes
- Order: Pezizales
- Family: Pezizaceae
- Genus: Peziza
- Species: P. vesiculosa

Binomial name
- Peziza vesiculosa Bull. (1790)

= Peziza vesiculosa =

Species of fungus

Peziza vesiculosa
- Mycological characteristics
- Smooth hymenium
- No distinct cap
- Hymenium attachment is not applicable
- Lacks a stipe
- Spore print is white
- Ecology is saprotrophic
- Edibility is poisonous

Peziza vesiculosa, commonly known as the common dung cup, is a species of apothecial fungus belonging to the family Pezizaceae.

== Description ==
The pale, cup-shaped ascocarps grow to 1–6 centimetres (1/2–2 1/2 inches) in width and often form clusters. The spore print is white.

=== Similar species ===
The species is difficult to identify from other Peziza without microscopy. Species with purplish tints, particularly within the cup, have been split off into Geoscypha. Similar species may also be found in the Tarzetta and Jafnea genera, as well as purplish species of Legaliana and Phylloscypha.

== Distribution and habitat ==
The species can be found year-round throughout North America; usually within its December–April season on the West Coast. It is common in Europe, with scattered records in other parts of the world. It is found on nutrient-rich soils, e.g. manure and compost.

== Toxicity ==
The species is considered poisonous, although cooking may neutralize the toxins.
