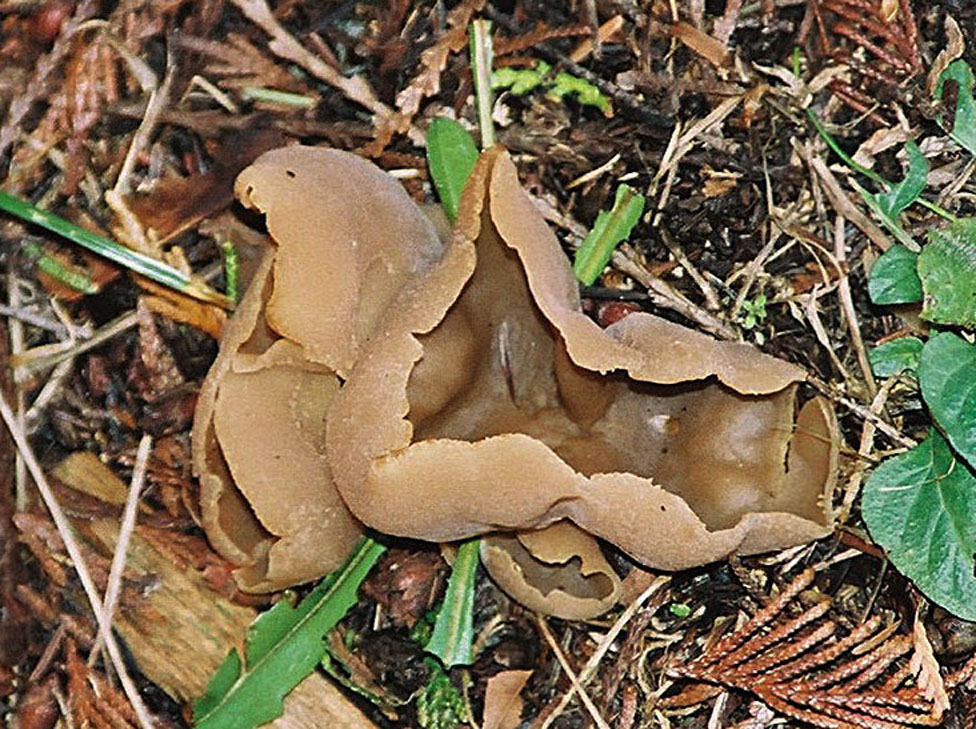

Scientific classification
- Domain: Eukaryota
- Kingdom: Fungi
- Division: Ascomycota
- Class: Pezizomycetes
- Order: Pezizales
- Family: Pezizaceae
- Genus: Peziza
- Species: P. petersii

Binomial name
- Peziza petersii Berk., 1875

= Peziza petersii =

Species of fungus

Peziza petersii is a species of apothecial fungus belonging to the family Pezizaceae. This is a European species with rather small and irregular brown saucer-shaped ascocarps up to 5 cm in diameter. It is most often encountered in tightly packed groups on burned ground from summer to autumn.
