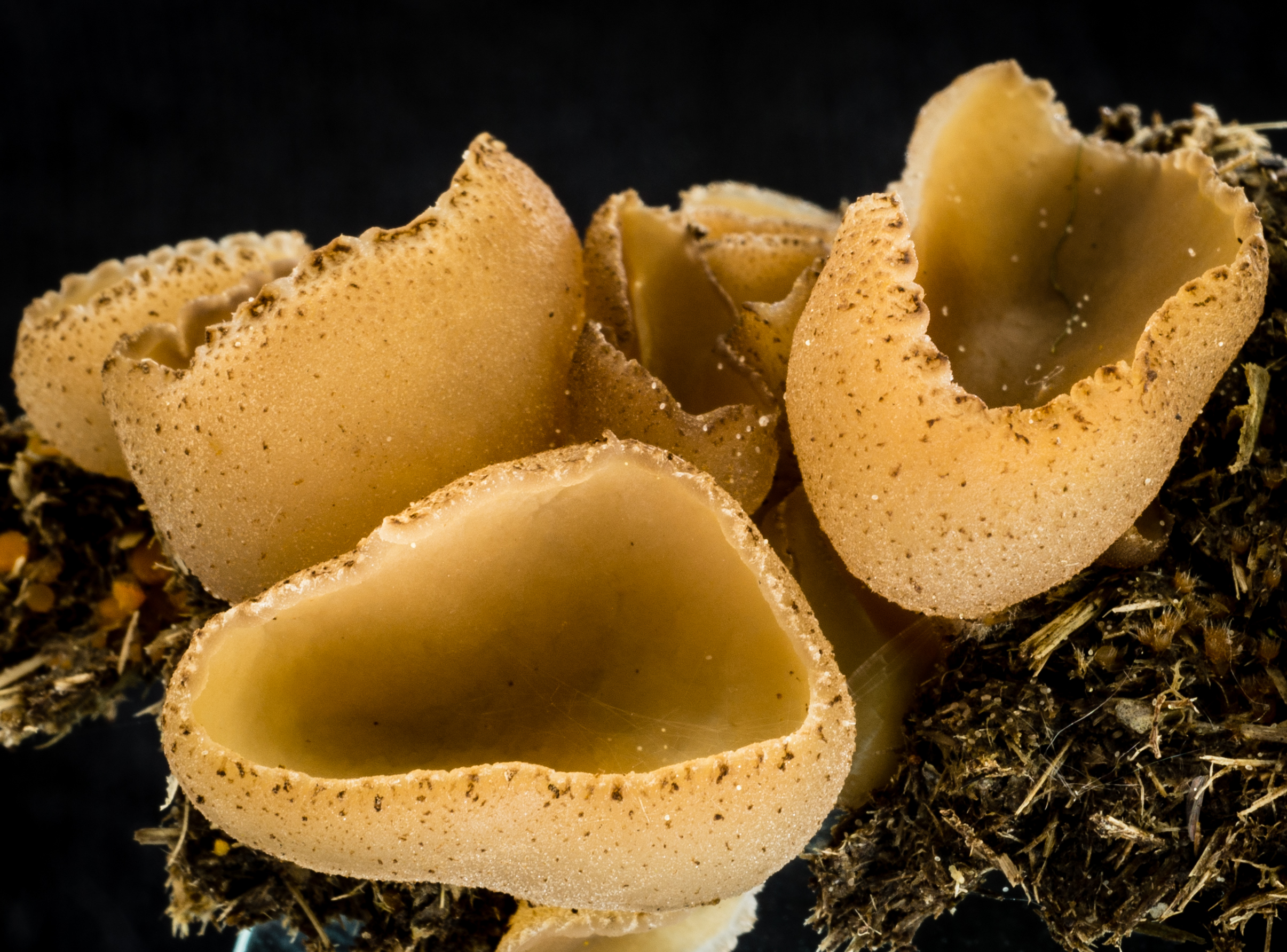

Scientific classification
- Kingdom: Fungi
- Division: Ascomycota
- Class: Pezizomycetes
- Order: Pezizales
- Family: Pezizaceae
- Genus: Peziza
- Species: P. fimeti

Binomial name
- Peziza fimeti (Fuckel) E.C.Hansen (1876)

Synonyms
- Humaria fimeti Fuckel (1871); Peziza bovina W.Phillips (1887); Humaria bovina (W.Phillips) Sacc. (1889)); Plicaria fimeti (Fuckel) Rehm (1894); Aleuria bovina (W.Phillips) Boud. (1907); Aleuria fimeti (Fuckel) Boud. (1907); Galactinia fimeti (Fuckel) Svrček & Kubička (1961)

= Peziza fimeti =

Species of fungus

Peziza fimeti is a species of ascomycete fungus belonging to the family Pezizaceae. Found in Europe and North America, the fungus grows on cow dung. It produces small, light brown, cup-shaped fruit bodies up to 2 cm (0.8 in) in diameter. The asci (spore-producing cells) are cylindrical (or nearly so), with dimensions of up to 280 μm long and 18 μm in diameter. The spores are ellipsoid and measure 8 by 16 μm.
