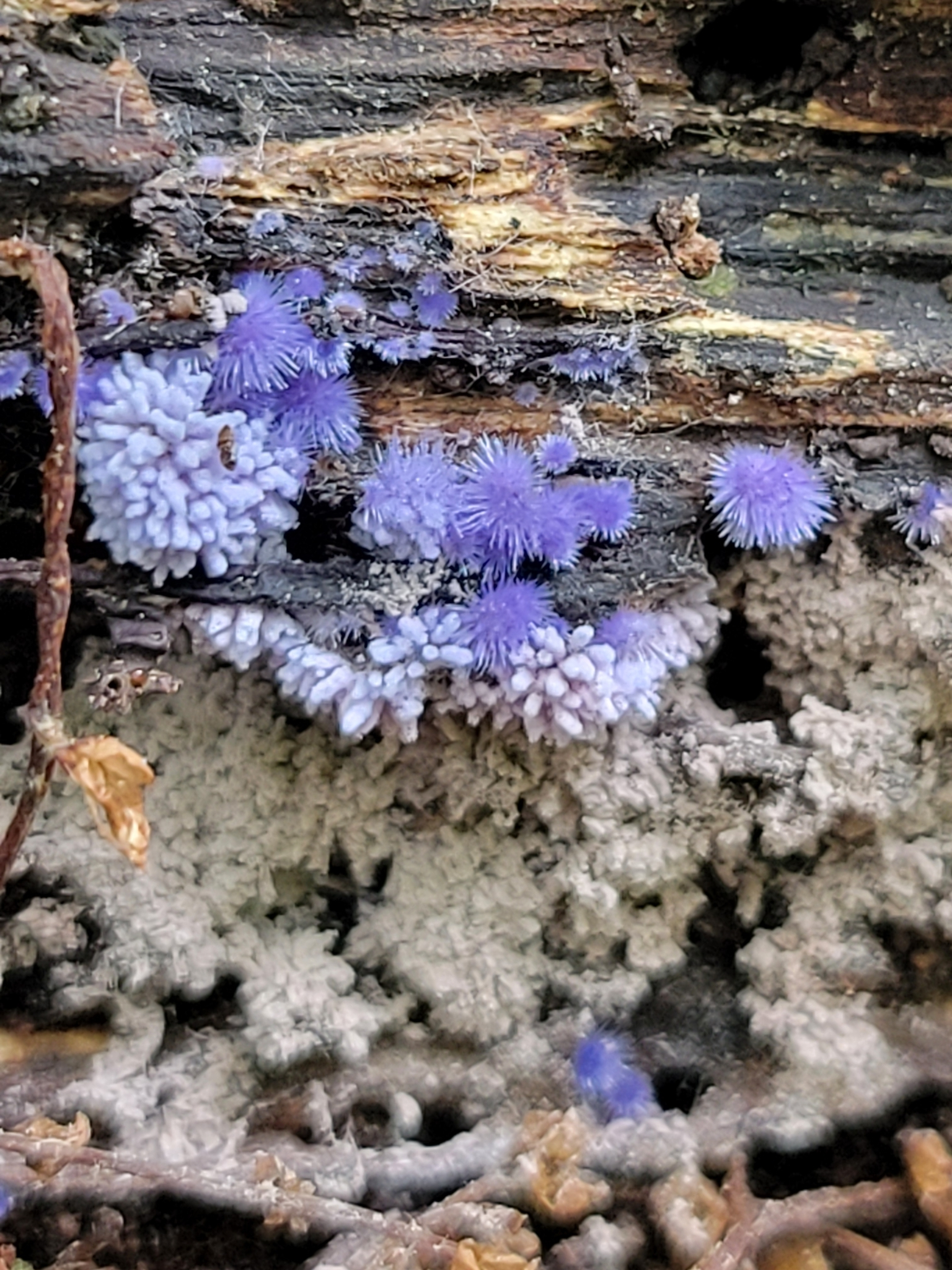

Scientific classification
- Kingdom: Fungi
- Division: Ascomycota
- Class: Pezizomycetes
- Order: Pezizales
- Family: Pezizaceae
- Genus: Chromelosporiopsis
- Species: C. coerulescens

Binomial name
- Chromelosporiopsis coerulescens (Bonord.) Hennebert

= Chromelosporiopsis coerulescens =

Species of fungus

Chromelosporiopsis coerulescens is a species of fungus in the family Pezizaceae. It was originally described as Polyactis coerulescens by German physician and mycologist Hermann Friedrich Bonorden in 1850 and was subsequently classified under the genus Chromelosporium as Chromelosporium coerulescens. In 2020, Grégoire L. Hennebert transferred the species to the newly established genus Chromelosporiopsis. In English, it is sometimes referred to as periwinkle sporemat.

== Description ==
Chromelosporiopsis coerulescens is a microfungus that produces erect synnemata. The synnemata are initially white to bright crystal-blue in color, later becoming rose-violet or rosy pink as they mature, and eventually developing an ochre coloration. The species was described by Hennebert as morphologically intermediate between Chromelosporium carneum and Chromelosporium tuberculatum.

== Habitat and distribution ==
Chromelosporiopsis coerulescens occurs in forest habitats, where it grows in clustered patches on decaying organic material such as dead leaves, decayed wood, and mosses. Hennebert reported the species as common in North America but rare in Europe, and documented it growing on rotting leaves and humic debris associated with sugar maple, yellow birch, and eastern hemlock in mixed woodland in Ontario, Canada. The species also has reported observations in Taiwan and southeastern Australia.

== Reproduction ==
Chromelosporiopsis coerulescens is known from its asexual, or anamorphic, stage. Its synnemata consist of branched, broom-like conidiophores that produce small, globose conidia. The asexual spores produced by this species are described as hyaline. The sexual stage of the species is not known.
