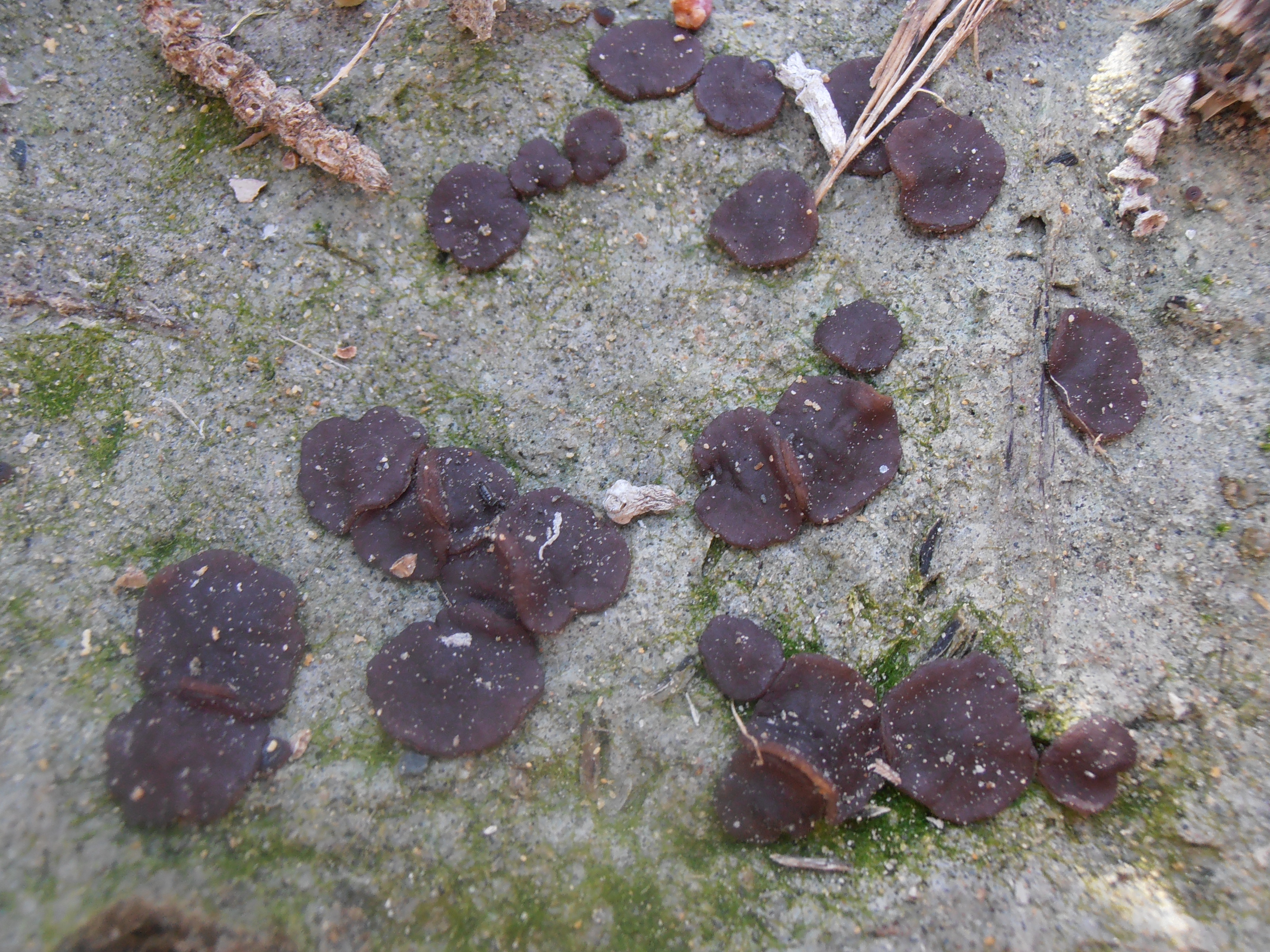

Scientific classification
- Kingdom: Fungi
- Division: Ascomycota
- Class: Pezizomycetes
- Order: Pezizales
- Family: Pezizaceae
- Genus: Daleomyces
- Species: D. halophilus

Binomial name
- Daleomyces halophilus (Loizides, Agnello & P. Alvarado) Van Vooren (2020)

Synonyms
- Peziza halophila Loizides, Agnello & P.Alvarado

= Daleomyces halophilus =

Species of fungus

Daleomyces halophilus (formerly Peziza halophila) is an ascomycete fungus in the family Pezizaceae, described as new to science in 2017. It was originally described in genus Peziza by Crous and colleagues in 2017, but in 2020 was transferred to the genus Deleomyces by Van Vooren, based on molecular data.

It is found on coastal dunes and halophytic wetlands on the Mediterranean island of Cyprus.
