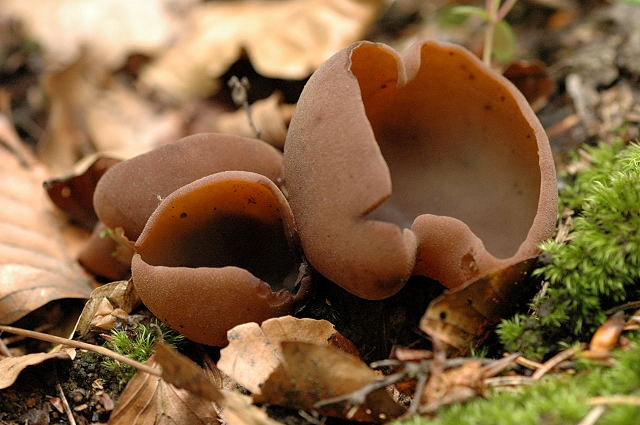

Scientific classification
- Kingdom: Fungi
- Division: Ascomycota
- Class: Pezizomycetes
- Order: Pezizales
- Family: Pezizaceae
- Genus: Legaliana
- Species: L. badia

Binomial name
- Legaliana badia (Pers.) Van Vooren, 2020

Synonyms
- Peziza badia Pers., 1800

= Legaliana badia =

Species of fungus

Legaliana badia is a species of apothecial fungus belonging to the family Pezizaceae. This is one of the more familiar of the cup fungi of Europe, appearing from August to November as irregular dark brown cups up to 8 centimetres (3 in) wide and 2 cm (3/4 in) tall, often in small groups, on soil in woodland. The species tends to be seen more frequently on sandy soils and favours bare ground, e.g. at the sides of paths. This is a frequently observed European species with scattered records from many other parts of the world.

Roger Phillips lists the species as inedible, but Tiffany Francis-Baker says it can be cooked and supplemented with other ingredients.
