= Scabropezia =

Scientific classification
- Kingdom: Fungi
- Division: Ascomycota
- Class: Pezizomycetes
- Order: Pezizales
- Family: Pezizaceae
- Genus: Scabropezia; Dissing & Pfister

Type species
- Scabropezia scabrosa (Cooke) Dissing & Pfister

Genus of fungi

Scabropezia is a genus of fungi within the Pezizaceae family.
