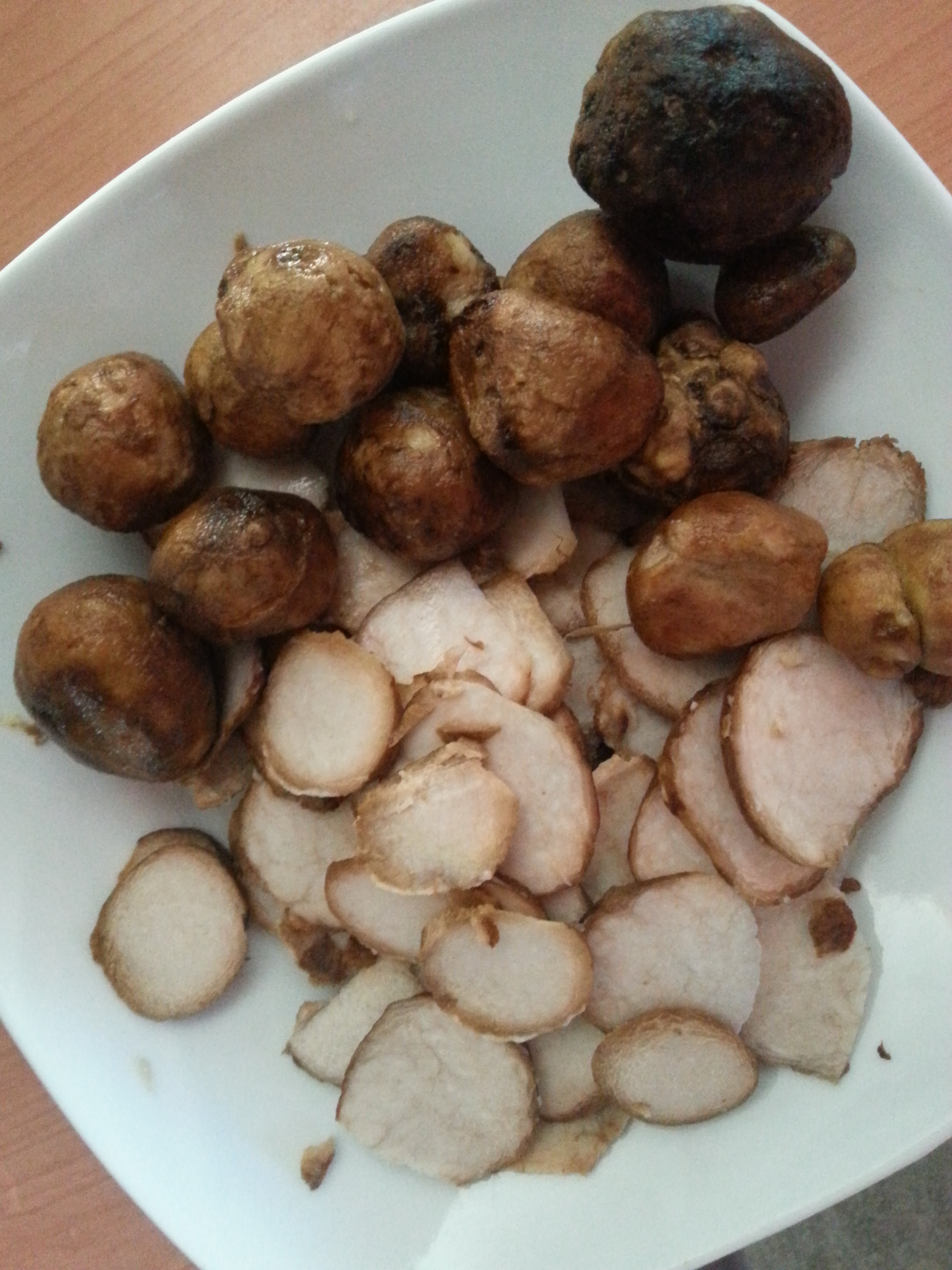

Scientific classification
- Kingdom: Fungi
- Division: Ascomycota
- Class: Pezizomycetes
- Order: Pezizales
- Family: Pezizaceae
- Genus: Kalaharituber; Trappe & Kagan-Zur (2005)
- Species: K. pfeilii

Binomial name
- Kalaharituber pfeilii (Henn.) Trappe & Kagan-Zur (2005)

Synonyms
- Terfezia pfeilii Henn. (1895)

= Kalaharituber =

Single-species genus of fungi

Kalaharituber, also known as ǁhabas or nabbas, is a fungal genus in the family Pezizaceae. It is a monotypic genus, whose single truffle-like species, Kalaharituber pfeilii, is found in the Kalahari Desert and other arid regions of Southern Africa.

== Taxonomy ==
The fungus was first described scientifically in 1895 by German mycologist Paul Christoph Hennings as Terfezia pfeilii, after German explorer Joachim von Pfeil, who brought Hennings the type specimen. The species was moved to its own genus in 2005 by James Trappe and Varda Kagan-Zur at Ben-Gurion University. It is in the family Pezizaceae.

== Description ==
Fruiting bodies can be up to 12 centimetres (4 3/4 in) in diameter. These weigh approximately 200 grams (7 oz), although larger rains (which affect weight) can cause them to weigh twice as much. These fruits grow close to the surface, which causes surface cracks on the ground above after rains. These fruiting bodies can occur as much as 40 cm away from the main hyphae.

The asci are spherical to ellipsoid, 70–100 by 50–80 μm, each containing 5–8 spherical spores, which are up to 16–25 μm, hyaline and later tannish. A double-layered 1.5-μm-thick cell wall turns yellowish under Melzer's reagent.

== Distribution and habitat ==
Kalaharituber pfeilii is found in the Kalahari Desert, which spans the larger part of Botswana, the east of Namibia and the Northern Cape Province of South Africa. It is also found in other arid regions of Southern Africa, such as Angola. It is found in soils with a pH ranging from 5.5 to 6.5, with a sand content varying from 94–97%, a clay content varying from 2–5% and a silt content varying from 1–4%.

== Ecology ==
Kalaharituber pfeilii is known to form an ectomycorrhizal relationship with Citrillus lanatus (watermelon), and is suspected to have a number of other possible relationships with other plant species. These include Sorghum bicolor, Eragrostis spp., Grewia flava, several species of acacia, and Cynodon dactylon.

It is eaten by meerkats, hyenas, baboons and bat-eared foxes.

== Conservation ==
The current populations of K. pfeilii are thought to be in deterioration, with possible causes advanced being over-harvesting, climate change or the land practices used in K. pfeilii habitats.

== Uses ==
Kalaharituber pfeilii is eaten by humans. According to a case study by the Australian National Botanic Gardens, the fruiting body is eaten by the Khoisan and other indigenous peoples of the Kalahari. Some commercial use of the species occurs.
