= Eremiomyces =

Scientific classification
- Kingdom: Fungi
- Division: Ascomycota
- Class: Pezizomycetes
- Order: Pezizales
- Family: Pezizaceae
- Genus: Eremiomyces; Trappe & Kagan-Zur

Type species
- Eremiomyces echinulatus (Trappe & Marasas) Trappe & Kagan-Zur

Genus of fungi

Eremiomyces is a fungal genus within the Pezizaceae family. This is a monotypic genus, containing the single species Eremiomyces echinulatus.
