= Boudiera =

Scientific classification
- Kingdom: Fungi
- Division: Ascomycota
- Class: Pezizomycetes
- Order: Pezizales
- Family: Pezizaceae
- Genus: Boudiera; Cooke

Type species
- Boudiera areolata Cooke & W. Phillips

Genus of fungi

Boudiera is a genus of fungi within the Pezizaceae family. It forms a clade with the genera Sarcosphaera and Iodophanus; the clade is a sister group to Ascobolus and Saccobolus, both in the family Ascobolaceae.
