= Sanshi Imai =

Japanese mycologist

Sanshi Imai (今井 三子, Imai Sanshi, 1900–1976) was a Japanese mycologist of Hokkaido Imperial University.

== Eponymous taxa ==
- Clitocybe imaiana
- Imaia
- Lactarius imaianus
- Stropharia imaiana

== Selected publications ==
- Sanshi Imai (1929) "On the Clavariaceae of Japan: I". Transactions of the Sapporo Natural History Society Vol. 11, No. 1, pp. 38–45.
- Sanshi Imai (1930) "On the Clavariaceae of Japan: II". Transactions of the Sapporo Natural History Society Vol. 11, No. 2, pp. 70–77.
- Sanshi Imai (1931) "On the Clavariaceae of Japan: III. The species of Clavaria found in Hokkaido and Southern Saghalien". Transactions of the Sapporo Natural History Society Vol. 12, No. 1, pp. 9–12.
- Sanshi Imai (1932) "Contributions to the knowledge of the classification of the Helvellaceae". Botanical Magazine (Tokyo) 46:544, pp. 172–175.
- Sanshi Imai (1932) "Studies on the Hypocreaceae of Japan: I. Podostroma". Transactions of the Sapporo Natural History Society Vol. 12, pp. 114–118.
- Sanshi Imai (1933) "Studies on the Agaricaceae of Japan: I. Volvate Agarics in Hokkaido". Botanical Magazine (Tokyo) Vol. 47, No. 558, pp. 423–432.

== See also ==
- Category:Taxa named by Sanshi Imai
