= Aquapeziza =

Scientific classification
- Domain: Eukaryota
- Kingdom: Fungi
- Division: Ascomycota
- Class: Pezizomycetes
- Order: Pezizales
- Family: Pezizaceae
- Genus: Aquapeziza; D.M.Hu, L.Cai & K.D.Hyde, 2012

Type species
- Aquapeziza globispora D.M.Hu, L.Cai & K.D.Hyde, 2012

Species
- Aquapeziza globispora D.M.Hu, L.Cai & K.D.Hyde, 2012

Monotypic genus of aquatic mushroom

Aquapeziza is a genus of fungus under the family Pezizaceae. It categorizes species of fungi that live submerged in freshwater. This is a monotypic taxon with the single documented species being Aquapeziza globispora.

== Discovery ==
The genus of fungus was discovered on 7 February 2010, in Yulu Stream, Yunnan Province, China.
