= Peziza oliviae =

Scientific classification
- Domain: Eukaryota
- Kingdom: Fungi
- Division: Ascomycota
- Class: Pezizomycetes
- Order: Pezizales
- Family: Pezizaceae
- Genus: Peziza
- Species: P. oliviae

Binomial name
- Peziza oliviae J.L.Frank (2014)

Species of fungus

Peziza oliviae is a species of fungus in the family Peziza. It is an olive-brown stalked cup fungus discovered growing underwater in streams in the U.S. State of Oregon.

== Description ==
Peziza oliviae has small olive to golden-brown stalked cups 0.7–2.5 cm in height with a diameter of 0.8–4 cm.

== Habitat and distribution ==
Found in small streams in the Cascade Range of North Central Oregon at elevations between 800 and 1500 metres. P. oliviae was found growing on dead wooden debris on the bottom of streams or on saturated wood at the surface or bank of the stream. Documented June through October.

== Discovery ==
P. oliviae was discovered in 2014 by Jonathan L. Frank of Southern Oregon University.
