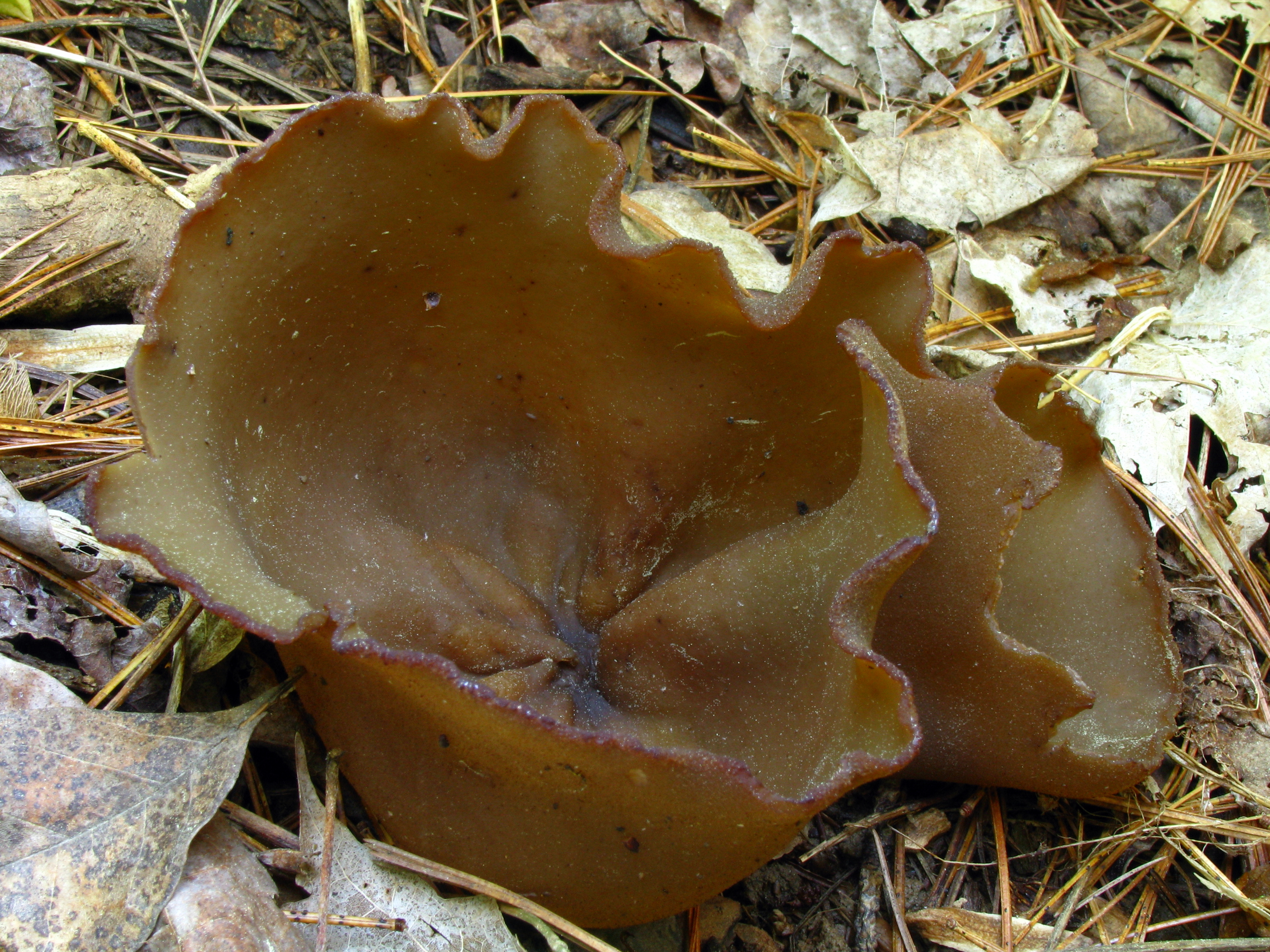

Scientific classification
- Domain: Eukaryota
- Kingdom: Fungi
- Division: Ascomycota
- Class: Pezizomycetes
- Order: Pezizales
- Family: Pezizaceae
- Genus: Peziza
- Species: P. phyllogena

Binomial name
- Peziza phyllogena Cooke (1877)

Synonyms
- Aleuria olivacea Boud.(1897); Peziza olivacea (Boud.) Sacc. & P.Syd. (1899); Galactinia olivacea (Boud.) Boud. (1907); Plicaria olivacea (Boud.) Keissl. (1922); Peziza badioconfusa Korf (1954); Galactinia badioconfusa (Korf) Svrček & Kubička (1963)

= Peziza phyllogena =

Species of fungus

Peziza phyllogena, commonly known as the common brown cup or the pig-ear cup, is a species of fungus in the family Pezizaceae. A saprobic species, the fungus produces brownish, cup-shaped fruit bodies that grow singly or in clusters on either soil or well-rotted wood. It is found in Europe, North America, and Iceland, where it fruits in the spring.

== Taxonomy ==
The species was first described by Mordecai Cubitt Cooke in 1877, based on material from South Carolina sent to him by American botanist Henry William Ravenel. In a 1987 publication, Donald Pfister placed Peziza badioconfusa in synonymy with P. phyllogena. The former species had been described by Richard P. Korf in 1954; in that publication, Korf noted "It is perhaps our commonest large cup-fungus, and it seems to me that it must have been described before 1897 by some European or American author, but I have seen no types which match it." It is commonly known as the common brown cup, or the pig-ear cup.

== Description ==
The fruit bodies of Peziza phyllogena are cup-shaped, measuring 3–8 cm (1.2–3.1 in) in diameter. The flesh is thin and fragile, and the sides of the cup are often compressed or lobed. The cups do not have a stem, and instead are attached to the substrate at a narrow central point on the bottom. The inner surface of the cup is dark purplish brown to dark reddish gray, while the outer surface is similar to the inner surface, or may have more purplish tones. The cup margin is thin, with a sharp edge, and it turns black as it dries. The edibility of the fungus was unknown, but Roger Phillips considers it edible.

The spore print is hyaline (translucent) to pale cream. The spores are ellipsoid, covered with warts, and measure 17–23 by 8–13 μm. The asci (spore-bearing cells) are operculate (containing a lid-like covering over the opening), eight-spored, and cylindrical, measuring 215–285 by 11.5–13.5 μm.

== Habitat and distribution ==
Peziza phyllogena grows solitarily or in dense clusters on soil or on well-decayed logs. Fruit bodies usually appear in early spring. The fungus has a widespread distribution in North America, especially the upper Midwest of the United States. It was newly recorded from Iceland in 2007.
