= Peziza ampliata =

Scientific classification
- Domain: Eukaryota
- Kingdom: Fungi
- Division: Ascomycota
- Class: Pezizomycetes
- Order: Pezizales
- Family: Pezizaceae
- Genus: Peziza
- Species: P. ampliata

Binomial name
- Peziza ampliata Pers., 1822

Species of fungus

Peziza ampliata is a species of apothecial fungus belonging to the family Pezizaceae. It appears as brown cups with a wrinkled interior, up to 3 cm across. It occurs, usually in small groups, on rotting wood, especially oak. It is largely a European species but has been recorded in the United States.
