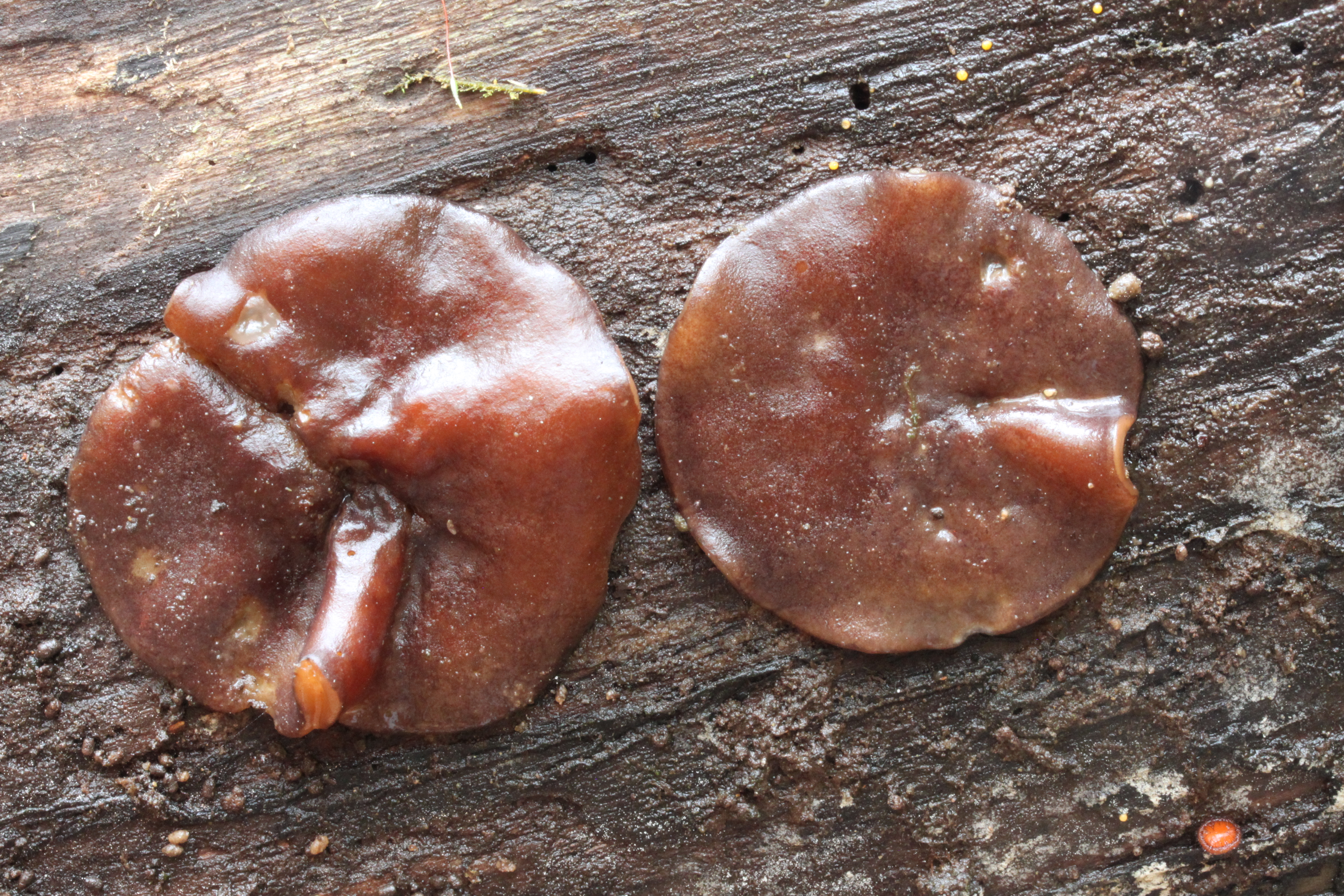
- Pachyella clypeata

Scientific classification
- Kingdom: Fungi
- Division: Ascomycota
- Class: Pezizomycetes
- Order: Pezizales
- Family: Pezizaceae
- Genus: Pachyella; Boud. (1907)

Type species
- Pachyella barlaeana (Bres.) Boud. (1907)

Species
- Pachyella babingtonii; Pachyella celtica; Pachyella clypeata; Pachyella globispora; Pachyella rhizinoides; Pachyella subisabellina; Pachyella violaceonigra

Synonyms
- Peltidium Kalchbr. (1862); Gorodkoviella Vassilkov (1969)

= Pachyella =

Genus of fungi

Pachyella is a genus of fungi in the family Pezizaceae. It was circumscribed by Jean Louis Émile Boudier in 1907.
