= Rhodopeziza =

Scientific classification
- Kingdom: Fungi
- Division: Ascomycota
- Class: Pezizomycetes
- Order: Pezizales
- Family: Pezizaceae
- Genus: Rhodopeziza; Hohmeyer & Moravec

Type species
- Rhodopeziza tuberculata (Gamundí) J. Moravec & Hohmeyer

Genus of fungi

Rhodopeziza is a genus of fungi within the Pezizaceae family. This is a monotypic genus, containing the single species Rhodopeziza tuberculata.
