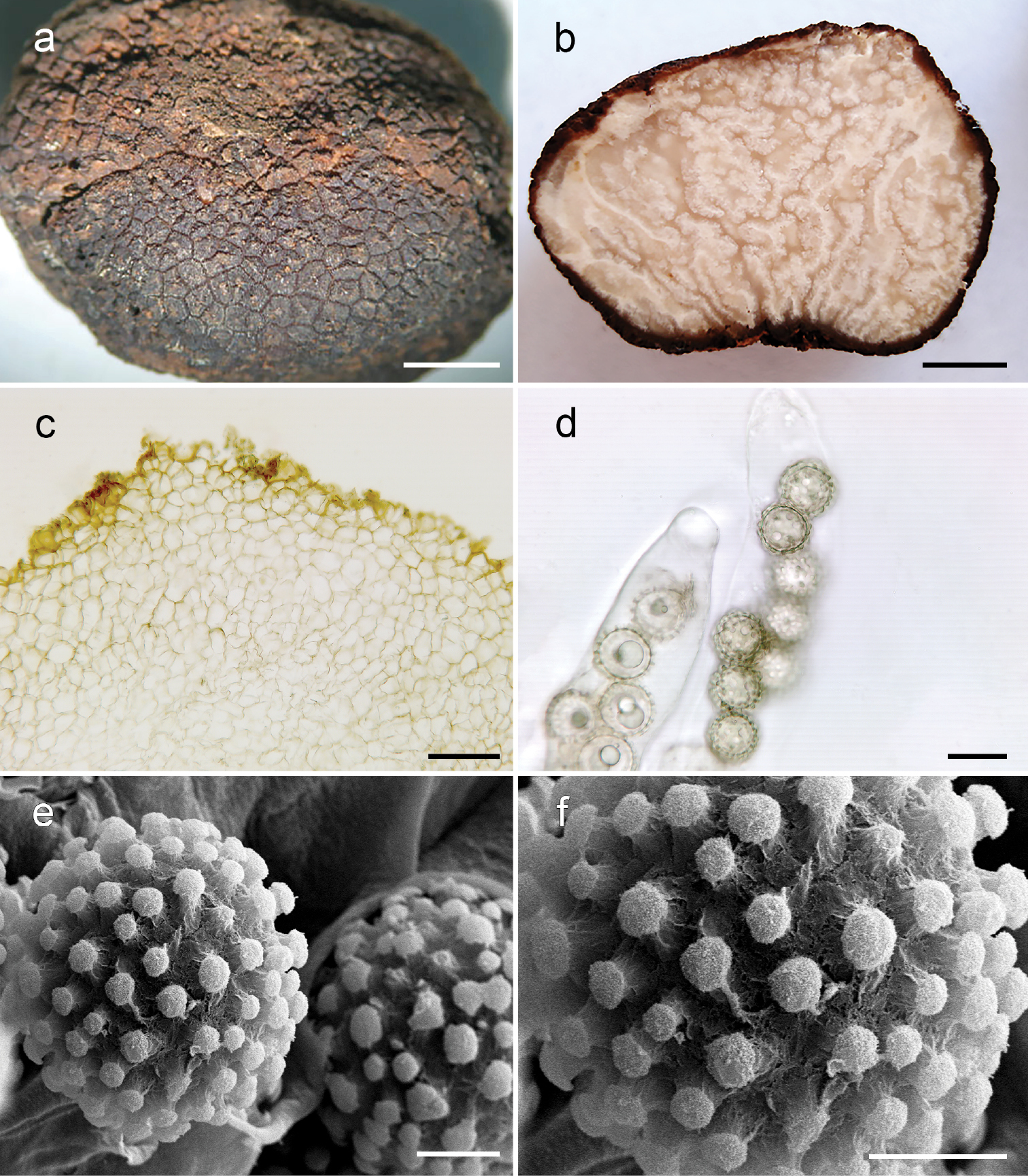
- Multiple views of Pachyphlodes brunnea

Scientific classification
- Kingdom: Fungi
- Division: Ascomycota
- Class: Pezizomycetes
- Order: Pezizales
- Family: Pezizaceae
- Genus: Pachyphlodes; Zobel 1854

species
- Pachyphlodes annagardnerae; Pachyphlodes atropurpurea; Pachyphlodes austro-oregonensis; Pachyphlodes brunnea; Pachyphlodes carnea; Pachyphlodes carneus; Pachyphlodes cinnabarina; Pachyphlodes citrina; Pachyphlodes citrinus; Pachyphlodes coalescens; Pachyphlodes conglomerata; Pachyphlodes conglomeratus; Pachyphlodes depressa; Pachyphlodes depressus; Pachyphlodes excavata; Pachyphlodes lateritia; Pachyphlodes lateritius; Pachyphlodes ligerica; Pachyphlodes ligericus; Pachyphlodes macrospora; Pachyphlodes macrosporus; Pachyphlodes marronina; Pachyphlodes marroninus; Pachyphlodes melanoxantha; Pachyphlodes melanoxanthus; Pachyphlodes nemoralis; Pachyphlodes oleifera; Pachyphlodes oleiferus; Pachyphlodes pfisteri; Pachyphlodes saccardoi; Pachyphlodes thysellii; Pachyphlodes virescens; Pachyphlodes wulushanensis

Synonyms
- Pachyphloeus Tul. & C.Tul. (1845); Cryptica R.Hesse (1884)

= Pachyphlodes =

Genus of fungi

Pachyphlodes, formerly Pachyphloeus, is a genus of Ascomycete fungi (Pezizales, Pezizaceae) that forms hypogeous fruit bodies, aka truffles. Pachyphloeus citrinus is known as the "berry truffle" and Pachyphloeus austro-oregonensis is known as the "southern Oregon berry truffle". The genus forms ectomycorrhizal mutualisms with tree roots, usually oaks. Truffles require animals to dig them up and eat them, in order to disperse their spores.

== Species ==
- Pachyphloeus austro-oregonensis
- Pachyphloeus carneus
- Pachyphloeus citrinus
- Pachyphloeus conglomeratus
- Pachyphloeus depressus – China
- Pachyphloeus lateritius
- Pachyphloeus ligericus
- Pachyphloeus macrosporus
- Pachyphloeus marroninus
- Pachyphloeus melanoxanthus
- Pachyphloeus prieguensis
- Pachyphloeus saccardoi
- Pachyphloeus thysellii
- Pachyphloeus virescens
