= Amylascus =

Scientific classification
- Kingdom: Fungi
- Division: Ascomycota
- Class: Pezizomycetes
- Order: Pezizales
- Family: Pezizaceae
- Genus: Amylascus; Trappe (1971)

Type species
- Amylascus herbertianus (J.W.Cribb) Trappe (1971)

Species
- A. herbertianus A. tasmanicus

Genus of fungi

Amylascus is a genus of truffle-like fungi in the Pezizaceae family. The genus, which contains two species found in Australasia, was circumscribed by mycologist James Trappe in 1971.
