= Hapsidomyces =

Scientific classification
- Kingdom: Fungi
- Division: Ascomycota
- Class: Pezizomycetes
- Order: Pezizales
- Family: Pezizaceae
- Genus: Hapsidomyces; J.C. Krug & Jeng

Type species
- Hapsidomyces venezuelensis J.C. Krug & Jeng

Genus of fungi

Hapsidomyces is a genus of fungi within the Pezizaceae family. This is a monotypic genus, containing the single species Hapsidomyces venezuelensis.
