= Hydnobolites =

Scientific classification
- Kingdom: Fungi
- Division: Ascomycota
- Class: Pezizomycetes
- Order: Pezizales
- Family: Pezizaceae
- Genus: Hydnobolites; Tul. & C. Tul.

Type species
- Hydnobolites cerebriformis Tul. & C. Tul.

Genus of fungi

Hydnobolites is a genus of fungi within the Pezizaceae family.
