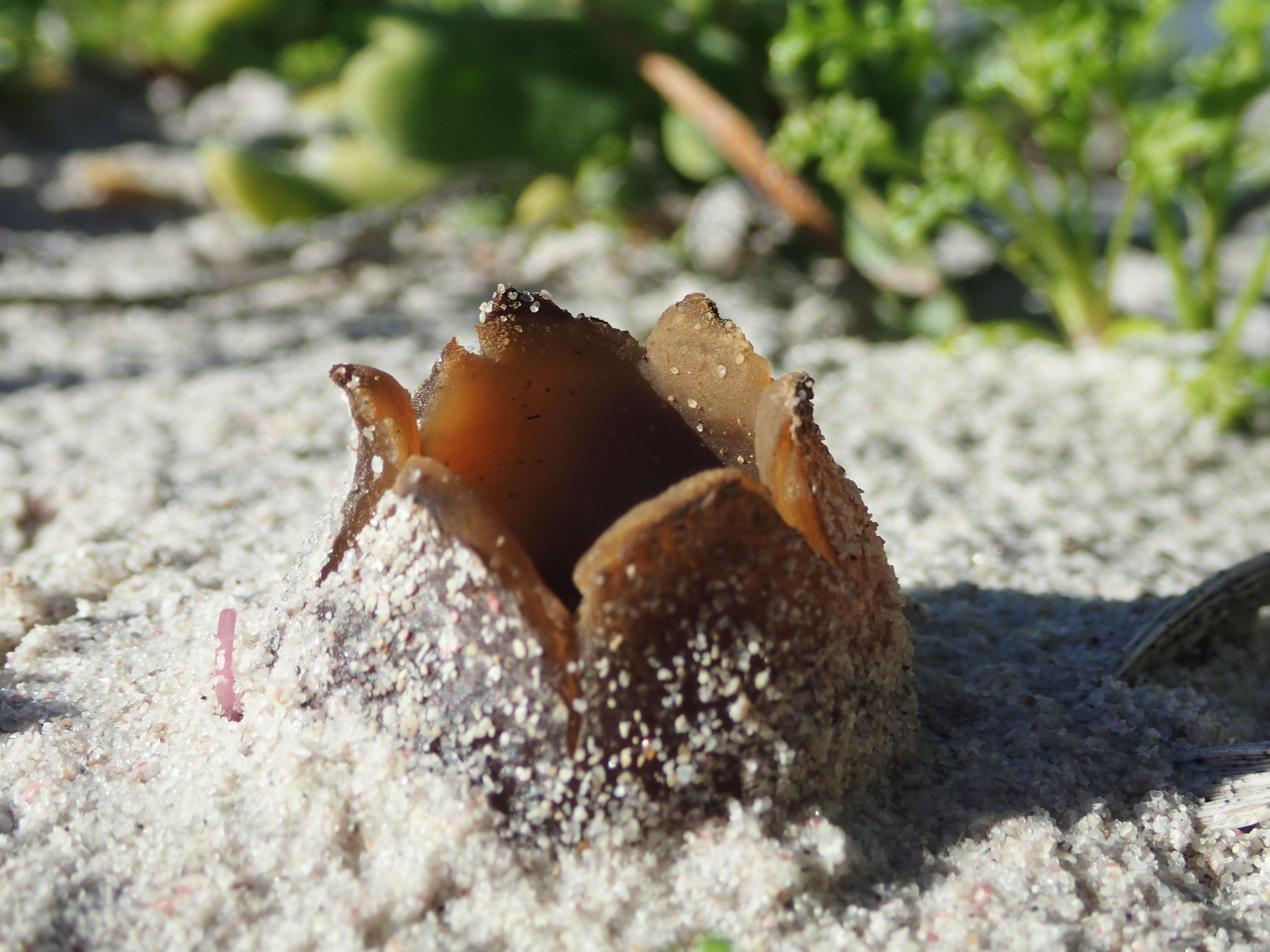

Scientific classification
- Kingdom: Fungi
- Division: Ascomycota
- Class: Pezizomycetes
- Order: Pezizales
- Family: Pezizaceae
- Genus: Peziza
- Species: P. ammophila

Binomial name
- Peziza ammophila Saut.

= Peziza ammophila =

Species of fungus

Peziza ammophila is a fungus in the cup fungus genus Peziza. It grows on sand dunes and beaches. As it gets older, it comes out from the sand and splits. It grows in winter and spring, and there are records from North America, Argentina, Chile, Uruguay, the UK, Europe, Australia and South Africa. It is cup shaped. The Dutch call these Zandtulpjes, or "sand tulips."
