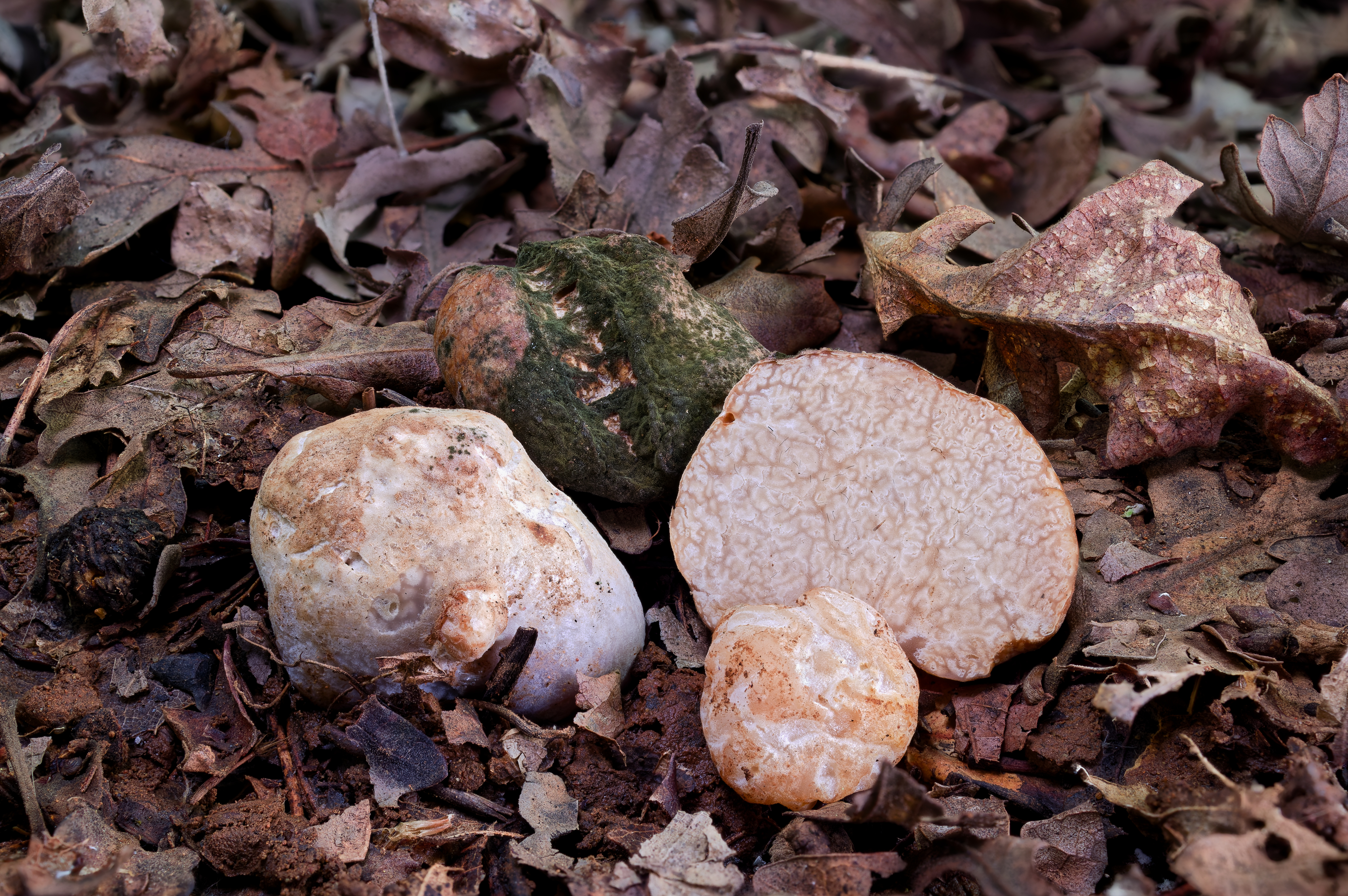
- Cazia flexiascus in Folsom, California

Scientific classification
- Kingdom: Fungi
- Division: Ascomycota
- Class: Pezizomycetes
- Order: Pezizales
- Family: Pezizaceae
- Genus: Cazia; Trappe

Type species
- Cazia flexiascus Trappe

= Cazia =

Genus of fungi

Cazia is a genus of fungi within the Pezizaceae family.
