= Iodowynnea =

Scientific classification
- Kingdom: Fungi
- Division: Ascomycota
- Class: Pezizomycetes
- Order: Pezizales
- Family: Pezizaceae
- Genus: Iodowynnea; Medel, Guzmán & Chacon

Type species
- Iodowynnea auriformis (Pat. ex Le Gal) Medel, Guzmán & S. Chacón

Genus of fungi

Iodowynnea is a genus of fungi within the Pezizaceae family. This is a monotypic genus, containing the single species Iodowynnea auriformis.
