= Hydnotryopsis =

Scientific classification
- Kingdom: Fungi
- Division: Ascomycota
- Class: Pezizomycetes
- Order: Pezizales
- Family: Pezizaceae
- Genus: Hydnotryopsis; Gilkey

Type species
- Hydnotryopsis setchellii Gilkey

Genus of fungi

Hydnotryopsis is a genus of fungi within the Pezizaceae family.
