= Mattirolomyces =

Scientific classification
- Kingdom: Fungi
- Division: Ascomycota
- Class: Pezizomycetes
- Order: Pezizales
- Family: Pezizaceae
- Genus: Mattirolomyces; E. Fisch.

Genus of fungi

Mattirolomyces is a genus of fungi within the Pezizaceae family.
