= Iodophanus =

Scientific classification
- Kingdom: Fungi
- Division: Ascomycota
- Class: Pezizomycetes
- Order: Pezizales
- Family: Pezizaceae
- Genus: Iodophanus; Korf

Type species
- Iodophanus carneus (Pers.) Korf

Genus of fungi

Iodophanus is a genus of fungi within the Pezizaceae family.
