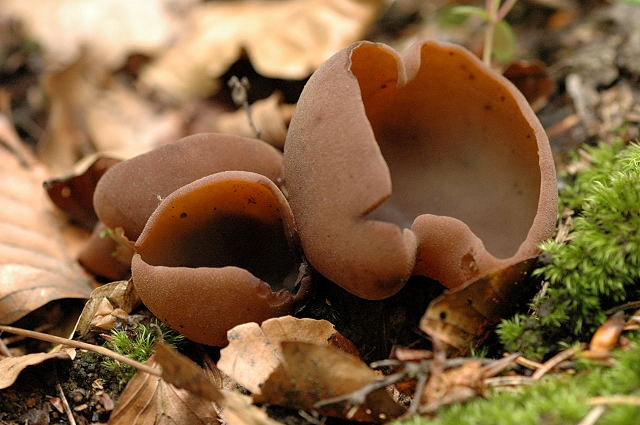
- Peziza badia

Scientific classification
- Kingdom: Fungi
- Division: Ascomycota
- Class: Pezizomycetes
- Order: Pezizales
- Family: Pezizaceae; Dumort. (1829)

Type genus
- Peziza Dill. ex Fr. (1822)

Genera
- Adelphella; Amylascus; Aquapeziza; Boudiera; Calongea; Cazia; Chromelosporium; Delastria; Elderia; Galactinia; Glischroderma; Hapsidomyces; Hydnobolites; Hydnoplicata; Hydnotryopsis; Imaia; Iodophanus; Iodowynnea; Kalaharituber; Luteoamylascus; Mattirolomyces; Muciturbo; Mycoclelandia; Oedocephalum; Pachyella; Pachyphlodes; Pachyphloeus; Peziza; Plicaria; Plicariella; Ruhlandiella; Sarcopeziza; Sarcosphaera; Scabropezia; Stouffera; Temperantia; Terfezia; Tirmania; Ulurua

= Pezizaceae =

Family of fungi

The Pezizaceae (commonly referred to as cup fungi) are a family of fungi in the Ascomycota which produce mushrooms that tend to grow in the shape of a "cup". Spores are formed on the inner surface of the fruit body (ascoma). The cup shape typically serves to focus raindrops into splashing spores out of the cup. Additionally, the curvature enables wind currents to blow the spores out in a different manner than in most agarics and boletes.

Cup fungi grow in peculiar shapes, frequently resembling cups or saucers. For example, the orange peel fungus (Aleuria aurantia) resembles a discarded orange rind. According to one 2008 estimate, the family contains 31 genera and 230 species.

== Subtaxa ==
Pezizaceae includes the following:

- Adelphella
  - Adelphella babingtonii
- Amylascus
  - Amylascus tasmanicus
- Aquapeziza
  - Aquapeziza globispora
- Boudiera
  - Boudiera acanthospora
  - Boudiera dennisii
  - Boudiera tracheia
- Calongea
  - Calongea prieguensis
- Cazia
  - Cazia flexiascus
- Chromelosporiopsis
  - Chromelosporiopsis coerulescens
- Chromelosporium
  - Chromelosporium carneum
  - Chromelosporium macrospermum
- Delastria
  - Delastria rosea
  - Delastria supernova
- Elderia
  - Elderia arenivaga
- Galactinia
  - Galactinia pseudosylvestris
- Glischroderma
- Hapsidomyces
  - Hapsidomyces venezuelensis
- Hydnobolites
  - Hydnobolites californicus
  - Hydnobolites cerebriformis
- Hydnoplicata
  - Hydnoplicata convoluta
- Hydnotryopsis
  - Hydnotryopsis gautierioides
  - Hydnotryopsis gilkeyae
  - Hydnotryopsis setchellii
- Imaia
  - Imaia gigantea
- Iodophanus
  - Iodophanus carneus
  - Iodophanus hyperboreus
  - Iodophanus testaceus
- Iodowynnea
  - Iodowynnea auriformis
- Kalaharituber
  - Kalaharituber pfeilii
- Luteoamylascus
  - Luteoamylascus aculeatus
- Mattirolomyces
  - Mattirolomyces austroafricanus
  - Mattirolomyces mexicanus
  - Mattirolomyces mulpu
  - Mattirolomyces spinosus
  - Mattirolomyces terfezioides
- Muciturbo
- Mycoclelandia
  - Mycoclelandia arenacea
  - Mycoclelandia bulundari
- Oedocephalum
  - Oedocephalum adhaerens
  - Oedocephalum elegans
  - Oedocephalum nayoroense
- Pachyella
  - Pachyella adnata
  - Pachyella babingtonii
  - Pachyella clypeata
  - Pachyella habrospora
  - Pachyella punctispora
  - Pachyella violaceonigra
- Pachyphlodes
  - Pachyphlodes austro-oregonensis
  - Pachyphlodes carneus
  - Pachyphlodes citrinus
  - Pachyphlodes conglomerata
  - Pachyphlodes depressus
  - Pachyphlodes ligericus
  - Pachyphlodes marronina
  - Pachyphlodes melanoxanthus
  - Pachyphlodes nemoralis
  - Pachyphlodes pfisteri
  - Pachyphlodes thysellii
  - Pachyphlodes virescens
- Pachyphloeus
  - Pachyphloeus oleiferus
- Peziza
  - Peziza alaskana
  - Peziza alcis
  - Peziza ammophila
  - Peziza ampelina
  - Peziza ampliata
  - Peziza apiculata
  - Peziza arvernensis
  - Peziza atrovinosa
  - Peziza badia
  - Peziza badioconfusa
  - Peziza badiofusca
  - Peziza bananincola
  - Peziza berthetiana
  - Peziza bovina
  - Peziza brunneoatra
  - Peziza buxea
  - Peziza campestris
  - Peziza depressa
  - Peziza domiciliana
  - Peziza echinospora
  - Peziza ellipsospora
  - Peziza emileia
  - Peziza erini
  - Peziza exogelatinosa
  - Peziza fimeti
  - Peziza flavida
  - Peziza fruticosa
  - Peziza gerardii
  - Peziza granularis
  - Peziza griseo-rosea
  - Peziza halophila
  - Peziza howsei
  - Peziza infossa
  - Peziza infuscata
  - Peziza irina
  - Peziza kallioi
  - Peziza limnaea
  - Peziza lividula
  - Peziza lobulata
  - Peziza lohjaoensis
  - Peziza luteoloflavida
  - Peziza michelii
  - Peziza montirivicola
  - Peziza moseri
  - Peziza muscicola
  - Peziza natrophila
  - Peziza ninguis
  - Peziza nivalis
  - Peziza nordica
  - Peziza obtuspiculata
  - Peziza oceanica
  - Peziza oliviae
  - Peziza ostracoderma
  - Peziza perdicina
  - Peziza petersii
  - Peziza phlebospora
  - Peziza phyllogena
  - Peziza polaripapulata
  - Peziza praetervisa
  - Peziza proteana
    - Peziza proteana f. proteana
    - Peziza proteana f. sparassoides
  - Peziza pseudoammophila
    - Peziza pseudoammophila var. bonii
  - Peziza pseudovesiculosa
  - Peziza pseudoviolacea
  - Peziza pudicella
  - Peziza pyrophila
  - Peziza quelepidotia
  - Peziza repanda
  - Peziza retrocurvata
  - Peziza retrocurvatoides
  - Peziza saccardoana
  - Peziza saniosa
  - Peziza shearii
  - Peziza stuntzii
  - Peziza subcitrina
  - Peziza subclavipes
  - Peziza subisabellina
  - Peziza subumbrina
  - Peziza subviolacea
  - Peziza succosa
  - Peziza succosella
  - Peziza tarembergensis
  - Peziza udicola
  - Peziza vacinii
  - Peziza varia
  - Peziza vesiculosa
  - Peziza whitei
- Plicaria
  - Plicaria acanthodictya
  - Plicaria anthracina
  - Plicaria endocarpoides
  - Plicaria leiocarpa
  - Plicaria trachycarpa
    - Plicaria trachycarpa var. ferruginea
- Plicariella
  - Plicariella scabrosa
- Rhodopeziza
  - Rhodopeziza tuberculata
- Ruhlandiella
  - Ruhlandiella berolinensis
  - Ruhlandiella peregrina
  - Ruhlandiella reticulata
  - Ruhlandiella truncata
- Sarcopeziza
  - Sarcopeziza sicula
- Sarcosphaera
  - Sarcosphaera coronaria
  - Sarcosphaera crassa
- Scabropezia
  - Scabropezia flavovirens
  - Scabropezia scabrosa
- Stouffera
  - Stouffera longii
- Temperantia
  - Temperantia tiffanyae
- Terfezia
  - Terfezia albida
  - Terfezia alsheikhii
  - Terfezia arenaria
  - Terfezia boudieri
  - Terfezia canariensis
  - Terfezia cistophila
  - Terfezia claveryi
  - Terfezia crassiverrucosa
  - Terfezia eliocrocae
  - Terfezia extremadurensis
  - Terfezia fanfani
  - Terfezia grisea
  - Terfezia leptoderma
  - Terfezia lusitanica
  - Terfezia morenoi
  - Terfezia olbiensis
  - Terfezia pini
  - Terfezia pseudoleptoderma
  - Terfezia trappei
- Tirmania
  - Tirmania honrubiae
  - Tirmania nivea
  - Tirmania pinoyi
- Ulurua
  - Ulurua nonparaphysata
