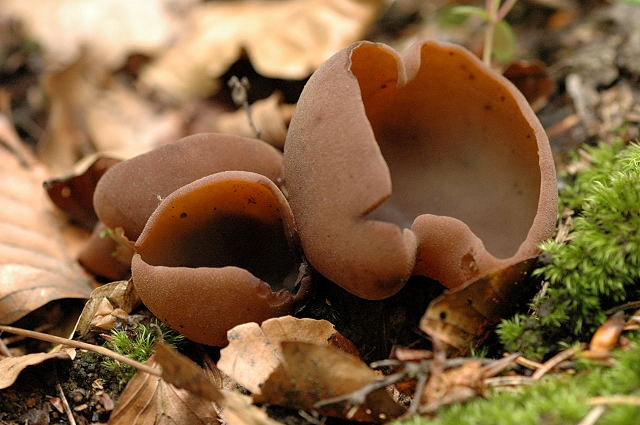
- Peziza badia

Scientific classification
- Kingdom: Fungi
- Division: Ascomycota
- Class: Pezizomycetes
- Order: Pezizales
- Family: Pezizaceae
- Genus: Peziza; Dill. ex Fries (1822)

Type species
- Peziza vesiculosa Bull. (1790)

= Peziza =

Genus of fungi

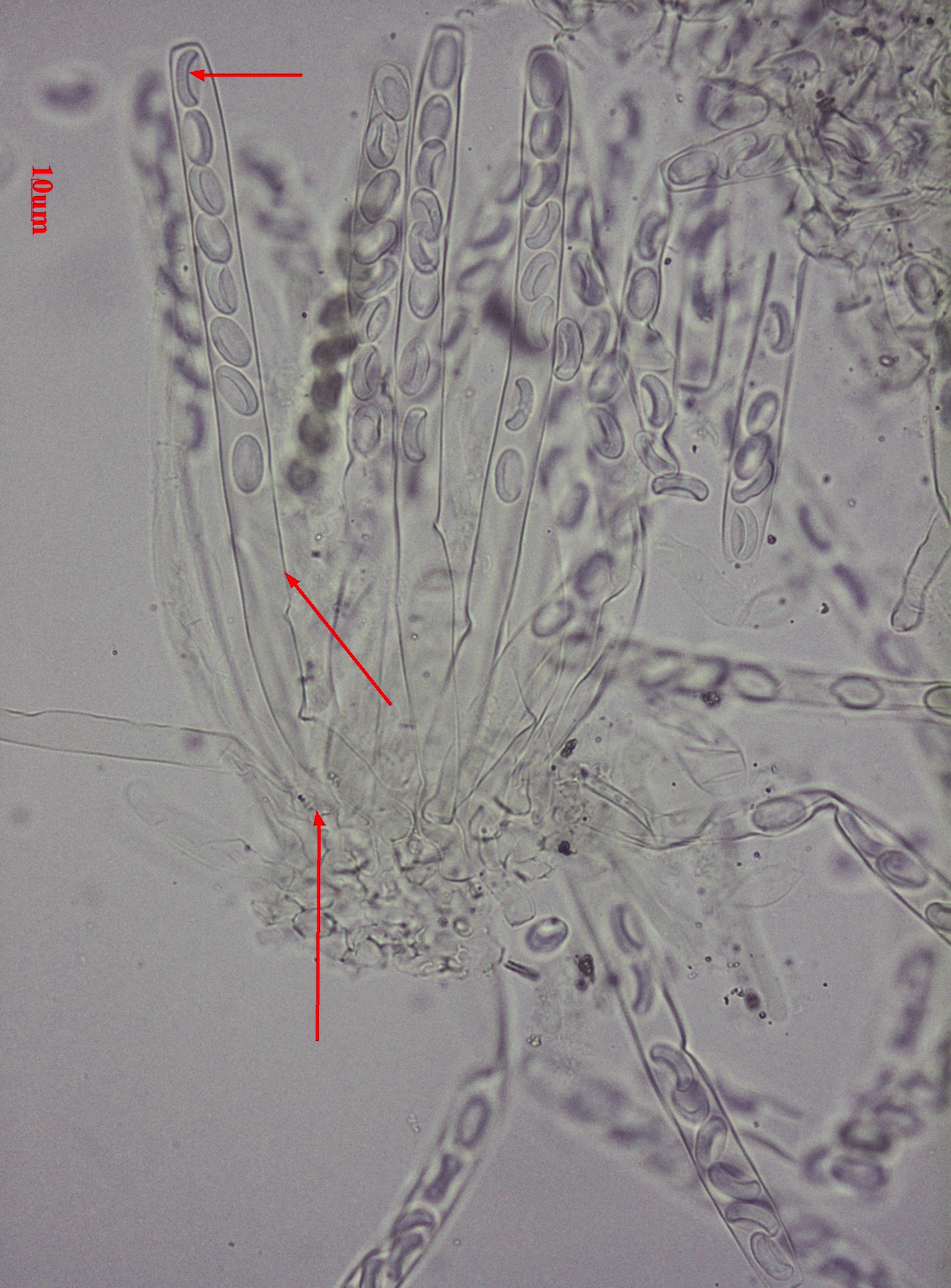
Peziza sp. fruit body spore sacs teased out and viewed under a microscope

Peziza is a large genus of saprophytic cup fungi that grow on the ground, rotting wood, or dung. Most members of this genus are of unknown edibility and are difficult to identify as separate species without use of microscopy. The polyphyletic genus has been estimated to contain over 100 species.

== Species ==
Species include:

- Peziza ammophila
- Peziza ampliata
- Peziza arvernensis
- Peziza badia
- Peziza cerea
- Peziza domiciliana
- Peziza echinospora
- Peziza erini
- Peziza fimeti
- Peziza granulosa
- Peziza halophila
- Peziza infossa
- Peziza micropus group
- Peziza moseri
- Peziza oliviae
- Peziza ostracoderma
- Peziza petersii
- Peziza phyllogena
- Peziza praetervisa
- Peziza repanda
- Peziza succosa
- Peziza sylvestris
- Peziza varia
- Peziza vesiculosa
- Peziza violacea
