= James Trappe =

American mycologist (born 1931)

James Martin Trappe
- Born: Spokane, Washington, USA
- Citizenship: United States
- Known for: Researching Truffles
- Scientific career
- Fields: Mycology, Forestry
- Doctoral advisor: Daniel Elliot Stuntz
- Author abbrev. (botany): Trappe

James Martin Trappe (born 1931) is a mycologist and expert in the field of North American truffle species. He has authored or co-authored 450 scientific papers and written three books on the subject. MycoBank lists him as either author or co-author of 401 individual species, and over the course of his career he has helped guide research on mycorrhizal fungi, and reshaped truffle taxonomy: establishing a new order, two new families, and 40 individual genera.

== Research ==
=== Hypogeous Fungi or ‘Truffles’ ===
Trappe first encountered truffles in the wild in the late 1950s during his Ph.D. thesis research. Since then Trappe has become widely regarded as one of the foremost experts on truffles in the world. In his search for truffle specimens he has collected on "every continent except Africa and Antarctica".

=== Mycorrhizae ===
Trappe has also been keenly interested in the role of mycorrhizal fungi (which many truffles are) in natural environments. As early as his undergraduate tenure he was doing work on the subject, and his PhD thesis was to monograph Cenococcum graniforme, one of the most ubiquitous and promiscuous mycorrhizal symbiotes on the planet. However, more notable in his early career was his pioneering compilation of mycorrhizal fungi, which is “one of the most cited papers in mycorrhizal research”. In his postdoctoral research he elucidated the mycorrhizal causes of poor colonization and growth by Pseudotsuga menziesii in soils without enough mycorrhizal symbiotes present in the area. To date he is one of the major voices in mycorrhizal research, particularly with respect to its application to forestry.

== Life ==
=== Childhood ===
Trappe started studying nature very early on in his life. From as young as age five his family would head out into the woods for picnics with family friends that were foresters in the Spokane, WA area or as far abreast as the close reaches of Idaho. “[My dad’s friend] just made the whole forest come alive.” Trappe recounted in one interview.

=== College and early career ===
Trappe attended the University of Washington, where he received his bachelor's degree in Forest Management. Later in his career he went on to get his Master's at the State University of New York in the same field before returning to the University in Washington to work on his PhD with Daniel Elliot Stuntz (a renowned expert on Inocybe), which he received in 1962. During his dissertation work Trappe started employment at the USDA Forest Service Pacific Northwest Research Station at La Grande, Oregon, where he worked for two years before transferring to the Portland station in 1958. Trappe’s thesis on Cenococcum graniforme was established along with his comprehensive compilation of ectomycorrhizal fungi (the first of its kind).

Trappe was appointed a project leader in forest mycology at the Corvallis station in 1965 and he stayed in that position until his 'retirement' in 1996. When he arrived at Corvallis, one of the most important collections of hypogeous fungi in North America was in care of the retiring Professor Helen Margaret Gilkey who bequeathed it to Trappe, a windfall which aided his future research immensely. During his tenure at Corvallis he participated in and eventually became a trustee of the North American Truffling Society which has worked to further collaboration among hobbyists and researchers on in the field of hypogeous fungi, travelled to Turin to study truffle specimens, hosted visiting scholars from over 20 countries and mentored many prominent mycologists in their own right.

=== Continuing Work ===
Despite having retired, Trappe remained as a research professor with the Department of Forest Science at Corvallis for 10 years before technically retiring in 1996. he has remained active well after his second retirement. Since 1999 he has been sojourning to Australia for 4–5 months a year to work on truffle taxonomy with the Australian Government, resulting in many papers. In 2007 he published a book on North American truffle identification with his son and published a second volume on the ecological status of truffles with Chris Maser and Andrew W. Claridge in 2008.

Trappe has continued to publish, with papers published as recently as 2013 regarding his work on Australian truffle diversity.

== Eponymous species ==
Several taxa have been named in honor of Trappe:

Family

- Trappeaceae

Genera

- Trappea Castellano (1990)
- Trappeindia Castellano, S.L.Miller, Singh & Lakhanpal (2012)

Species

- Acaulospora trappei R.N.Ames & Linderman (1976)
- Cystangium trappei Lebel (2003)
- Elaphomyces trappei R.Galán & G.Moreno (1991)

== Books ==
- Field Guide to North American Truffles: Hunting, Identifying, and Enjoying the World’s Most Prized Fungi with his son and Frank Evans 2007
- Trees, Truffles, and Beasts: How Forests Function with Chris Maser and Andrew W. Claridge 2008

== See also ==
- List of mycologists
