= List of fungi by conservation status =

- Extinct in the wild (EW): 0 species
- Critically endangered (CR): 15 species
- Endangered (EN): 59 species
- Vulnerable (VU): 90 species
- Near threatened (NT): 40 species
- Least concern (LC): 54 species
- Data deficient (DD): 22 species
Fungus species (IUCN, 2019-3)
- 280 extant species have been evaluated
- 258 of those are fully assessed (Note: excludes data deficient evaluations.)
- 94 are not threatened at present (Note: NT and LC.)
- 164 to 186 are threatened (Note: Threatened comprises CR, EN and VU. Upper estimate additionally includes DD.)
- 0 are extinct or extinct in the wild.

Map of countries with Red Lists for fungi

As of December 2019, the International Union for Conservation of Nature (IUCN) has evaluated the conservation status of 280 fungus species.

Previously in the 2017-3 release, the IUCN evaluated the conservation status of 56 fungus species. One subspecies, that of Pleurotus nebrodensis, also was evaluated but has since been removed. At the time no subpopulations were evaluated.

As of October 2002, the New Zealand Threat Classification System listed 1512 species and 39 subspecies of New Zealand fungi, with 65 species considered Threatened.

== IUCN listings ==
This is a complete list of fungus species and subspecies evaluated by the IUCN.

Species name	Redlist category	Redlist criteria	Population Trend	Phylum	Class	Order	Family
Acanthothecis leucoxanthoides	CR	B2ab(ii,iii,v); C2a(i); D	Stable	ascomycota	lecanoromycetes	ostropales	graphidaceae
Acanthothecis paucispora	CR	A3c; B2ab(i,ii,iii,iv); C2a(i); D	Stable	ascomycota	lecanoromycetes	ostropales	graphidaceae
Bridgeoporus nobilissimus	CR	A2c; C2a(i)	Decreasing	basidiomycota	agaricomycetes	incertae sedis	incertae sedis
Buellia asterella	CR	A4c	Decreasing	ascomycota	lecanoromycetes	teloschistales	physciaceae
Deconica baylisiana	CR	D	Decreasing	basidiomycota	agaricomycetes	agaricales	strophariaceae
Destuntzia rubra	CR	C2a(i)	Decreasing	basidiomycota	agaricomycetes	gomphales	gomphaceae
Erioderma pedicellatum	CR	A2c+4c	Decreasing	ascomycota	lecanoromycetes	peltigerales	pannariaceae
Hypocreopsis amplectens	CR	C2a(i)	Decreasing	ascomycota	sordariomycetes	hypocreales	hypocreaceae
Lepiota luteophylla	CR	D	Unknown	basidiomycota	agaricomycetes	agaricales	agaricaceae
Lepiota rhodophylla	CR	D	Unknown	basidiomycota	agaricomycetes	agaricales	agaricaceae
Loxospora assateaguensis	CR	A3c; B1ab(iii)+2ab(iii)	Stable	ascomycota	lecanoromycetes	incertae sedis	sarrameanaceae
Podoserpula miranda	CR	C2a(ii)	Decreasing	basidiomycota	agaricomycetes	amylocorticiales	amylocorticiaceae
Ramalina portosantana	CR	B1ab(iii)+2ab(iii)	Decreasing	ascomycota	lecanoromycetes	lecanorales	ramalinaceae
Rinodina chrysomelaena	CR	A2c; B1ab(i,ii,iv)+2ab(i,ii,iv)	Decreasing	ascomycota	lecanoromycetes	teloschistales	physciaceae
Sulcaria isidiifera	CR	B2ab(i,ii,iii,iv,v)	Decreasing	ascomycota	lecanoromycetes	lecanorales	parmeliaceae
Abstoma purpureum	EN	D	Decreasing	basidiomycota	agaricomycetes	agaricales	agaricaceae
Antrodia alpina	EN	C2a(i)	Decreasing	basidiomycota	agaricomycetes	polyporales	fomitopsidaceae
Arthonia kermesina	EN	A2c+4c; B1ab(i,ii,iii,iv,v); D	Decreasing	ascomycota	arthoniomycetes	arthoniales	arthoniaceae
Auriscalpium sp. nov. 'Blackwood'	EN	D	Unknown	basidiomycota	agaricomycetes	russulales	auriscalpiaceae
Boletopsis nothofagi	EN	B2ab(ii,iii,v); D	Decreasing	basidiomycota	agaricomycetes	thelephorales	bankeraceae
Boletus chilensis	EN	B1ab(iii)+2ab(iii)	Decreasing	basidiomycota	agaricomycetes	boletales	boletaceae
Butyriboletus loyo	EN	A2cd+3cd+4cd	Decreasing	basidiomycota	agaricomycetes	boletales	boletaceae
Calostoma insigne	EN	A4c	Decreasing	basidiomycota	agaricomycetes	boletales	calostomataceae
Cetreliopsis papuae	EN	B2ab(iii,iv)	Unknown	ascomycota	lecanoromycetes	lecanorales	parmeliaceae
Cladonia perforata	EN	B1ab(iii,iv,v)c(iii,iv)	Unknown	ascomycota	lecanoromycetes	lecanorales	cladoniaceae
Claustula fischeri	EN	B2ab(ii,iii,iv,v); C2a(i)	Decreasing	basidiomycota	agaricomycetes	phallales	claustulaceae
Cortinarius osloensis	EN	C2a(i)	Decreasing	basidiomycota	agaricomycetes	agaricales	cortinariaceae
Cortinarius pavelekii	EN	A2ce; B1ab(ii,iii,iv,v)+2ab(ii,iii,iv,v); C2a(i)	Decreasing	basidiomycota	agaricomycetes	agaricales	cortinariaceae
Cortinarius prasinocyaneus	EN	C2a(i)	Decreasing	basidiomycota	agaricomycetes	agaricales	cortinariaceae
Cystoderma carpaticum	EN	D	Stable	basidiomycota	agaricomycetes	agaricales	agaricaceae
Echinodontium ballouii	EN	D	Unknown	basidiomycota	agaricomycetes	russulales	echinodontiaceae
Echinodontium japonicum	EN	B1ab(i,iii,iv,v); C2a(i)	Decreasing	basidiomycota	agaricomycetes	russulales	echinodontiaceae
Echinodontium ryvardenii	EN	C2a(i)	Unknown	basidiomycota	agaricomycetes	russulales	echinodontiaceae
Entoloma eugenei	EN	C2a(i)	Decreasing	basidiomycota	agaricomycetes	agaricales	entolomataceae
Entoloma ravinense	EN	D	Stable	basidiomycota	agaricomycetes	agaricales	entolomataceae
Fevansia aurantiaca	EN	B2ab(ii,iii,iv,v); C2a(i)	Decreasing	basidiomycota	agaricomycetes	boletales	rhizopogonaceae
Flaviporus citrinellus	EN	A2c+4c	Decreasing	basidiomycota	agaricomycetes	polyporales	meruliaceae
Fomitopsis officinalis	EN	A2ad	Decreasing	basidiomycota	agaricomycetes	polyporales	fomitopsidaceae
Ganoderma sp. nov. 'Awaroa'	EN	D	Unknown	basidiomycota	agaricomycetes	polyporales	ganodermataceae
Gastroboletus valdivianus	EN	B1ab(iii)+2ab(iii)	Decreasing	basidiomycota	agaricomycetes	boletales	boletaceae
Gastrolactarius camphoratus	EN	A2c; C2a(i)	Decreasing	basidiomycota	agaricomycetes	russulales	russulaceae
Gloeocantharellus dingleyae	EN	C2a(ii)	Decreasing	basidiomycota	agaricomycetes	gomphales	gomphaceae
Gloiocephala cerkezii	EN	D	Decreasing	basidiomycota	agaricomycetes	agaricales	physalacriaceae
Gloioxanthomyces vitellinus	EN	A2c+3d+4c	Decreasing	basidiomycota	agaricomycetes	agaricales	incertae sedis
Gymnoderma insulare	EN	B2ab(i,ii,iii,v)	Decreasing	ascomycota	lecanoromycetes	lecanorales	cladoniaceae
Heimioporus australis	EN	B1ab(iii); D	Unknown	basidiomycota	agaricomycetes	boletales	boletaceae
Hygrocybe boothii	EN	B1ab(iii,v); D	Decreasing	basidiomycota	agaricomycetes	agaricales	hygrophoraceae
Hygrocybe flavifolia	EN	C2a(i)	Decreasing	basidiomycota	agaricomycetes	agaricales	hygrophoraceae
Hygrocybe noelokelani	EN	C1	Decreasing	basidiomycota	agaricomycetes	agaricales	hygrophoraceae
Hygrocybe pakelo	EN	B1ab(ii,iii,iv,v)+2ab(ii,iii,iv,v)	Decreasing	basidiomycota	agaricomycetes	agaricales	hygrophoraceae
Hygrophorus calophyllus	EN	A2c+3c+4c	Decreasing	basidiomycota	agaricomycetes	agaricales	hygrophoraceae
Hymenopellis atroruginosus	EN	B1ab(i,iii,v)+2ab(i,iii,v)	Decreasing	basidiomycota	agaricomycetes	agaricales	physalacriaceae
Hyphoderma etruriae	EN	C2a(i); D	Decreasing	basidiomycota	agaricomycetes	polyporales	meruliaceae
Ileodictyon sp. nov. 'vert de garnierii'	EN	B1ab(iii); D	Unknown	basidiomycota	agaricomycetes	phallales	phallaceae
Laccariopsis mediterranea	EN	A3c	Decreasing	basidiomycota	agaricomycetes	agaricales	physalacriaceae
Lactarius novae-zelandiae	EN	B2ab(iii); C2a(i); D	Decreasing	basidiomycota	agaricomycetes	russulales	russulaceae
Macrocystidia reducta	EN	B1ab(iii,v)+2ab(iii,v)	Decreasing	basidiomycota	agaricomycetes	agaricales	marasmiaceae
Neolentiporus squamosellus	EN	C2a(i)	Unknown	basidiomycota	agaricomycetes	polyporales	fomitopsidaceae
Phaeocollybia oregonensis	EN	A2c; C2a(i)	Decreasing	basidiomycota	agaricomycetes	agaricales	cortinariaceae
Pluteus bressollensis	EN	B1ab(i,ii,iii,v)+2ab(i,ii,iii,v)	Decreasing	basidiomycota	agaricomycetes	agaricales	pluteaceae
Pseudotricholoma metapodium	EN	A2c+3c+4c	Decreasing	basidiomycota	agaricomycetes	agaricales	tricholomataceae
Ramalina confertula	EN	D	Stable	ascomycota	lecanoromycetes	lecanorales	ramalinaceae
Ramalina erosa	EN	D	Stable	ascomycota	lecanoromycetes	lecanorales	ramalinaceae
Ramalina timdaliana	EN	D	Unknown	ascomycota	lecanoromycetes	lecanorales	ramalinaceae
Ramaria verlotensis	EN	C1+2a(i)	Unknown	basidiomycota	agaricomycetes	gomphales	gomphaceae
Rhizopogon alexsmithii	EN	B2ab(ii,iv,v); C1+2a(i)	Decreasing	basidiomycota	agaricomycetes	boletales	rhizopogonaceae
Rinodina brodoana	EN	B2ab(v)	Decreasing	ascomycota	lecanoromycetes	teloschistales	physciaceae
Russula pleurogena	EN	C2a(ii)	Decreasing	basidiomycota	agaricomycetes	russulales	russulaceae
Santessoniella crossophylla	EN	B2ab(i,ii,iii,iv,v)	Decreasing	ascomycota	lecanoromycetes	peltigerales	pannariaceae
Spongiforma squarepantsii	EN	C2a(i)	Decreasing	basidiomycota	agaricomycetes	boletales	boletaceae
Squamanita schreieri	EN	C2a(i)	Decreasing	basidiomycota	agaricomycetes	agaricales	tricholomataceae
Sticta alpinotropica	EN	D	Unknown	ascomycota	lecanoromycetes	peltigerales	Peltigeraceae
Sulcaria badia	EN	B2ab(i,ii,iii,iv,v)	Decreasing	ascomycota	lecanoromycetes	lecanorales	parmeliaceae
Xerocomus griseo-olivaceus	EN	C2a(ii)	Decreasing	basidiomycota	agaricomycetes	boletales	boletaceae
Acantholichen galapagoensis	VU	B1ab(iii)+2ab(iii); D2	Decreasing	basidiomycota	agaricomycetes	corticiales	corticiaceae
Agaricus pattersoniae	VU	C2a(i)	Stable	basidiomycota	agaricomycetes	agaricales	agaricaceae
Alessioporus ichnusanus	VU	C2a(i)	Decreasing	basidiomycota	agaricomycetes	boletales	boletaceae
Aleurodiscus bernicchiae	VU	B2ab(ii,iii,v); C2a(i)	Decreasing	basidiomycota	agaricomycetes	russulales	stereaceae
Amanita aporema	VU	A2c+4c	Decreasing	basidiomycota	agaricomycetes	agaricales	amanitaceae
Amanita elongatospora	VU	C1	Decreasing	basidiomycota	agaricomycetes	agaricales	amanitaceae
Amanita morrisii	VU	C1	Decreasing	basidiomycota	agaricomycetes	agaricales	amanitaceae
Amanita ristichii	VU	C2a(i)	Decreasing	basidiomycota	agaricomycetes	agaricales	amanitaceae
Anthracoidea andina	VU	B2ab(ii,iii)	Decreasing	basidiomycota	ustilaginomycetes	ustilaginales	anthracoideaceae
Anthracoidea ortegae	VU	B2ab(ii,iii)	Decreasing	basidiomycota	ustilaginomycetes	ustilaginales	anthracoideaceae
Anthracophyllum pallidum	VU	D1	Unknown	basidiomycota	agaricomycetes	agaricales	omphalotaceae
Antrelloides atroceracea	VU	D1	Decreasing	ascomycota	pezizomycetes	pezizales	pezizaceae
Anzia centrifuga	VU	D2	Unknown	ascomycota	lecanoromycetes	lecanorales	parmeliaceae
Arrhenia discorosea	VU	C2a(i)	Decreasing	basidiomycota	agaricomycetes	agaricales	hygrophoraceae
Austroboletus viscidoviridis	VU	C1	Decreasing	basidiomycota	agaricomycetes	boletales	boletaceae
Baeospora myriadophylla	VU	C2a(i)	Decreasing	basidiomycota	agaricomycetes	agaricales	marasmiaceae
Berggrenia aurantiaca	VU	D1	Decreasing	ascomycota	incertae sedis	incertae sedis	incertae sedis
Boletinellus merulioides	VU	A3e+4ce	Decreasing	basidiomycota	agaricomycetes	boletales	boletinellaceae
Bondarcevomyces taxi	VU	C2a(i)	Decreasing	basidiomycota	agaricomycetes	boletales	tapinellaceae
Bondarzewia retipora	VU	C2a(i); D1	Decreasing	basidiomycota	agaricomycetes	russulales	bondarzewiaceae
Bovista paludosa	VU	A2c+3c+4c	Decreasing	basidiomycota	agaricomycetes	agaricales	agaricaceae
Buchwaldoboletus lignicola	VU	C2a(i)	Decreasing	basidiomycota	agaricomycetes	boletales	boletaceae
Buglossoporus magnus	VU	D2	Unknown	basidiomycota	agaricomycetes	polyporales	fomitopsidaceae
Callistosporium vinosobrunneum	VU	C1	Decreasing	basidiomycota	agaricomycetes	agaricales	tricholomataceae
Caloplaca rinodinae-albae	VU	D2	Unknown	ascomycota	lecanoromycetes	teloschistales	teloschistaceae
Cetradonia linearis	VU	C1	Decreasing	ascomycota	lecanoromycetes	lecanorales	cladoniaceae
Clavaria zollingeri	VU	A2c+3c+4c	Decreasing	basidiomycota	agaricomycetes	agaricales	clavariaceae
Cortinarius citrino-olivaceus	VU	C2a(i)	Decreasing	basidiomycota	agaricomycetes	agaricales	cortinariaceae
Cortinarius dalecarlicus	VU	C2a(i)	Decreasing	basidiomycota	agaricomycetes	agaricales	cortinariaceae
Cortinarius haasii	VU	C2a(i)	Decreasing	basidiomycota	agaricomycetes	agaricales	cortinariaceae
Cortinarius murellensis	VU	C2a(i)	Decreasing	basidiomycota	agaricomycetes	agaricales	cortinariaceae
Cortinarius odoratus	VU	C2a(i)	Decreasing	basidiomycota	agaricomycetes	agaricales	cortinariaceae
Cortinarius splendificus	VU	C2a(i)	Decreasing	basidiomycota	agaricomycetes	agaricales	cortinariaceae
Cuphophyllus canescens	VU	A2c+3c+4c	Decreasing	basidiomycota	agaricomycetes	agaricales	hygrophoraceae
Cuphophyllus colemannianus	VU	A2c+3c+4c	Decreasing	basidiomycota	agaricomycetes	agaricales	hygrophoraceae
Cuphophyllus lacmus	VU	A2c+3c+4c	Decreasing	basidiomycota	agaricomycetes	agaricales	hygrophoraceae
Cuphophyllus lepidopus	VU	A2c+3c+4c	Decreasing	basidiomycota	agaricomycetes	agaricales	hygrophoraceae
Cyttaria septentrionalis	VU	B2ab(iii,v); C2a(i)	Decreasing	ascomycota	leotiomycetes	cyttariales	cyttariaceae
Entoloma bloxamii	VU	A2c+3c+4c	Decreasing	basidiomycota	agaricomycetes	agaricales	entolomataceae
Entoloma griseocyaneum	VU	A2c+3c+4c	Decreasing	basidiomycota	agaricomycetes	agaricales	entolomataceae
Entoloma porphyrophaeum	VU	A2c+3c+4c	Decreasing	basidiomycota	agaricomycetes	agaricales	entolomataceae
Entoloma prunuloides	VU	A2c+3c+4c	Decreasing	basidiomycota	agaricomycetes	agaricales	entolomataceae
Flammulina ononidis	VU	A2c+3c+4c	Decreasing	basidiomycota	agaricomycetes	agaricales	physalacriaceae
Galeropsis polytrichoides	VU	C2a(i)	Decreasing	basidiomycota	agaricomycetes	agaricales	bolbitiaceae
Gliophorus europerplexus	VU	A2c+3c+4c	Decreasing	basidiomycota	agaricomycetes	agaricales	hygrophoraceae
Gliophorus reginae	VU	A2c+3c+4c	Decreasing	basidiomycota	agaricomycetes	agaricales	hygrophoraceae
Gyroporus punctatus	VU	C2a(i); D1	Decreasing	basidiomycota	agaricomycetes	boletales	gyroporaceae
Hapalopilus croceus	VU	A2c+3c+4c	Decreasing	basidiomycota	agaricomycetes	polyporales	polyporaceae
Humidicutis peleae	VU	A3e+4e	Decreasing	basidiomycota	agaricomycetes	agaricales	hygrophoraceae
Humidicutis poilena	VU	A3e+4e	Unknown	basidiomycota	agaricomycetes	agaricales	hygrophoraceae
Hydnellum compactum	VU	A2ace; C2a(i)	Decreasing	basidiomycota	agaricomycetes	thelephorales	bankeraceae
Hydnellum gracilipes	VU	A2c+3c+4c	Decreasing	basidiomycota	agaricomycetes	thelephorales	bankeraceae
Hydnellum mirabile	VU	A2c+3c+4c	Decreasing	basidiomycota	agaricomycetes	thelephorales	bankeraceae
Hygrocybe citrinovirens	VU	A2c+3c+4c	Decreasing	basidiomycota	agaricomycetes	agaricales	hygrophoraceae
Hygrocybe ingrata	VU	A2c+3c+4c	Decreasing	basidiomycota	agaricomycetes	agaricales	hygrophoraceae
Hygrocybe lamalama	VU	A3ce+4ce	Decreasing	basidiomycota	agaricomycetes	agaricales	hygrophoraceae
Hygrocybe ovina	VU	A2c+3c+4c	Decreasing	basidiomycota	agaricomycetes	agaricales	hygrophoraceae
Hygrocybe punicea	VU	A2c+3c+4c	Decreasing	basidiomycota	agaricomycetes	agaricales	hygrophoraceae
Hygrocybe spadicea	VU	A2c+3c+4c	Decreasing	basidiomycota	agaricomycetes	agaricales	hygrophoraceae
Hygrocybe splendidissima	VU	A2c+3c+4c	Decreasing	basidiomycota	agaricomycetes	agaricales	hygrophoraceae
Hygrocybe swanetica	VU	C2a(i)	Decreasing	basidiomycota	agaricomycetes	agaricales	hygrophoraceae
Hygrophorus subviscifer	VU	A2c+3c+4c	Decreasing	basidiomycota	agaricomycetes	agaricales	hygrophoraceae
Lactarius haugiae	VU	C2a(i)	Decreasing	basidiomycota	agaricomycetes	russulales	russulaceae
Lenzitopsis oxycedri	VU	C2a(i)	Decreasing	basidiomycota	agaricomycetes	thelephorales	thelephoraceae
Lepiota brunneolilacea	VU	D1	Decreasing	basidiomycota	agaricomycetes	agaricales	agaricaceae
Lepiota scaberula	VU	D1+2	Stable	basidiomycota	agaricomycetes	agaricales	agaricaceae
Leptonia carnea	VU	C2a(i)	Decreasing	basidiomycota	agaricomycetes	agaricales	entolomataceae
Lethariella togashii	VU	B2ab(iii)	Decreasing	ascomycota	lecanoromycetes	lecanorales	parmeliaceae
Leucoagaricus hesperius	VU	D1	Unknown	basidiomycota	agaricomycetes	agaricales	agaricaceae
Macrolepiota eucharis	VU	C1	Decreasing	basidiomycota	agaricomycetes	agaricales	agaricaceae
Microglossum atropurpureum	VU	A2c+3c+4c	Decreasing	ascomycota	geoglossomycetes	geoglossales	geoglossaceae
Neohygrocybe nitrata	VU	A2c+3c+4c	Decreasing	basidiomycota	agaricomycetes	agaricales	hygrophoraceae
Paraxerula caussei	VU	C2a(i)	Decreasing	basidiomycota	agaricomycetes	agaricales	physalacriaceae
Picipes rhizophilus	VU	C2a(i)	Decreasing	basidiomycota	agaricomycetes	polyporales	polyporaceae
Pluteus fenzlii	VU	C2a(i)	Decreasing	basidiomycota	agaricomycetes	agaricales	pluteaceae
Porpolomopsis calyptriformis	VU	A2c+3c+4c	Decreasing	basidiomycota	agaricomycetes	agaricales	hygrophoraceae
Pouzarella alissae	VU	D1	Unknown	basidiomycota	agaricomycetes	agaricales	entolomataceae
Ramaria purpurissima	VU	A2c; C1	Decreasing	basidiomycota	agaricomycetes	gomphales	gomphaceae
Rubinoboletus rubinus	VU	C2a(i)	Decreasing	basidiomycota	agaricomycetes	boletales	boletaceae
Sarcodon joeides	VU	A2c+3c+4c	Decreasing	basidiomycota	agaricomycetes	thelephorales	bankeraceae
Sarcodon sp. nov. 'Wombat'	VU	D1	Unknown	basidiomycota	agaricomycetes	thelephorales	bankeraceae
Sarcodontia crocea	VU	A2c+3c+4c	Decreasing	basidiomycota	agaricomycetes	polyporales	meruliaceae
Stereopsis vitellina	VU	A2c+3c+4c	Decreasing	basidiomycota	agaricomycetes	polyporales	steriopsidaceae
Trichoglossum walteri	VU	A2c+3c+4c	Decreasing	ascomycota	geoglossomycetes	geoglossales	geoglossaceae
Tricholoma acerbum	VU	A2c+3c+4c	Decreasing	basidiomycota	agaricomycetes	agaricales	tricholomataceae
Tricholoma apium	VU	A2d+3d+4d	Decreasing	basidiomycota	agaricomycetes	agaricales	tricholomataceae
Tricholoma borgsjoeënse	VU	A2c+3c+4c	Decreasing	basidiomycota	agaricomycetes	agaricales	tricholomataceae
Tulostoma niveum	VU	B2ab(ii,iii,iv,v); C2a(i)	Decreasing	basidiomycota	agaricomycetes	agaricales	agaricaceae
Xanthoparmelia beccae	VU	B2ab(iii,iv,v); D1+2	Decreasing	ascomycota	lecanoromycetes	lecanorales	parmeliaceae
Xeromphalina junipericola	VU	C2a(i); D1	Decreasing	basidiomycota	agaricomycetes	agaricales	mycenaceae
Amanita lepiotoides	NT	C1	Decreasing	basidiomycota	agaricomycetes	agaricales	amanitaceae
Amanita westii	NT	D1	Unknown	basidiomycota	agaricomycetes	agaricales	amanitaceae
Armillaria ectypa	NT		Decreasing	basidiomycota	agaricomycetes	agaricales	physalacriaceae
Ascoclavulina sakaii	NT	D1	Unknown	ascomycota	leotiomycetes	helotiales	helotiaceae
Beenakia dacostae	NT	C1	Decreasing	basidiomycota	agaricomycetes	gomphales	clavariadelphaceae
Boletopsis grisea	NT	A2c+3c+4c	Decreasing	basidiomycota	agaricomycetes	thelephorales	bankeraceae
Boletus aurantiosplendens	NT	D1	Unknown	basidiomycota	agaricomycetes	boletales	boletaceae
Boletus loyita	NT	B2b(iii)	Decreasing	basidiomycota	agaricomycetes	boletales	boletaceae
Boletus putidus	NT	B2b(iii)	Decreasing	basidiomycota	agaricomycetes	boletales	boletaceae
Catathelasma imperiale	NT	A2c+3c+4c	Decreasing	basidiomycota	agaricomycetes	agaricales	tricholomataceae
Cortinarius atrovirens	NT	A2c+3c+4c; C2a(i)	Decreasing	basidiomycota	agaricomycetes	agaricales	cortinariaceae
Cortinarius cupreorufus	NT		Decreasing	basidiomycota	agaricomycetes	agaricales	cortinariaceae
Cortinarius eucaeruleus	NT	A2c+3c+4c	Decreasing	basidiomycota	agaricomycetes	agaricales	cortinariaceae
Cortinarius ionochlorus	NT	A2c+3c+4c	Decreasing	basidiomycota	agaricomycetes	agaricales	cortinariaceae
Cortinarius meinhardii	NT	A2c+3c+4c	Decreasing	basidiomycota	agaricomycetes	agaricales	cortinariaceae
Cortinarius pinophilus	NT	A2c+3c+4c	Decreasing	basidiomycota	agaricomycetes	agaricales	cortinariaceae
Cortinarius suaveolens	NT	A2c+3c+4c	Decreasing	basidiomycota	agaricomycetes	agaricales	cortinariaceae
Entoloma excentricum	NT	A2c+3c+4c	Decreasing	basidiomycota	agaricomycetes	agaricales	entolomataceae
Gastrosporium simplex	NT	A2c+3c+4c	Decreasing	basidiomycota	agaricomycetes	boletales	gastrosporiaceae
Geoglossum difforme	NT	A2c+3c+4c	Decreasing	ascomycota	geoglossomycetes	geoglossales	geoglossaceae
Gyromitra korshinskii	NT	A2c+3c+4c; C2a(i)	Decreasing	ascomycota	pezizomycetes	pezizales	discinaceae
Haploporus odorus	NT	A2c+3c+4c	Decreasing	basidiomycota	agaricomycetes	polyporales	polyporaceae
Humidicutis arcohastata	NT	C1+2a(i)	Decreasing	basidiomycota	agaricomycetes	agaricales	hygrophoraceae
Hygrocybe coccineocrenata	NT	A2c+3c+4c	Decreasing	basidiomycota	agaricomycetes	agaricales	hygrophoraceae
Hygrophoropsis umbriceps	NT	C1+2a(i)	Decreasing	basidiomycota	agaricomycetes	boletales	hygrophoropsidaceae
Laccaria maritima	NT	A2c	Decreasing	basidiomycota	agaricomycetes	agaricales	hydnangiaceae
Leptogium rivulare	NT		Decreasing	ascomycota	lecanoromycetes	peltigerales	collemataceae
Leucoagaricus dyscritus	NT	D1	Unknown	basidiomycota	agaricomycetes	agaricales	agaricaceae
Mycena flavovirens	NT	D1	Decreasing	basidiomycota	agaricomycetes	agaricales	mycenaceae
Neoalbatrellus subcaeruleoporus	NT	D1	Unknown	basidiomycota	agaricomycetes	russulales	incertae sedis
Perenniporia medulla-panis	NT	A2c+3c	Decreasing	basidiomycota	agaricomycetes	polyporales	polyporaceae
Pseudoplectania melaena	NT	A2c+3c+4c	Decreasing	ascomycota	pezizomycetes	pezizales	sarcosomataceae
Ramaria rufescens	NT	A2c+3c+4c; C2a(i)	Decreasing	basidiomycota	agaricomycetes	gomphales	gomphaceae
Rhodotus palmatus	NT	A3c+4c	Decreasing	basidiomycota	agaricomycetes	agaricales	physalacriaceae
Rubroboletus dupainii	NT	C2a(i)	Decreasing	basidiomycota	agaricomycetes	boletales	boletaceae
Rubroboletus rhodoxanthus	NT	A2c+3c+4c; C2a(i)	Decreasing	basidiomycota	agaricomycetes	boletales	boletaceae
Russula albolutescens	NT	A2c+3c+4c	Decreasing	basidiomycota	agaricomycetes	russulales	russulaceae
Sarcodon leucopus	NT	A2c+3c+4c	Decreasing	basidiomycota	agaricomycetes	thelephorales	bankeraceae
Sarcosoma globosum	NT		Decreasing	ascomycota	pezizomycetes	pezizales	sarcosomataceae
Baisuzhenia humphreyi	NT	C2a(i)	Decreasing	basidiomycota	agaricomycetes	polyporales	steriopsidaceae
Agaricus arvensis	LC		Stable	basidiomycota	agaricomycetes	agaricales	agaricaceae
Agaricus bitorquis	LC		Stable	basidiomycota	agaricomycetes	agaricales	agaricaceae
Agaricus campestris	LC		Stable	basidiomycota	agaricomycetes	agaricales	agaricaceae
Agaricus sylvaticus	LC		Stable	basidiomycota	agaricomycetes	agaricales	agaricaceae
Albatrellus confluens	LC		Stable	basidiomycota	agaricomycetes	russulales	albatrellaceae
Amanita caesarea	LC		Unknown	basidiomycota	agaricomycetes	agaricales	amanitaceae
Amanita pumatona	LC		Unknown	basidiomycota	agaricomycetes	agaricales	amanitaceae
Amanita xanthocephala	LC		Stable	basidiomycota	agaricomycetes	agaricales	amanitaceae
Amylocystis lapponica	LC		Decreasing	basidiomycota	agaricomycetes	polyporales	fomitopsidaceae
Boletus edulis	LC		Stable	basidiomycota	agaricomycetes	boletales	boletaceae
Boletus pinophilus	LC		Stable	basidiomycota	agaricomycetes	boletales	boletaceae
Boletus reticulatus	LC		Stable	basidiomycota	agaricomycetes	boletales	boletaceae
Boletus subalpinus	LC		Stable	basidiomycota	agaricomycetes	boletales	boletaceae
Bondarzewia kirkii	LC		Stable	basidiomycota	agaricomycetes	russulales	bondarzewiaceae
Calocybe gambosa	LC		Stable	basidiomycota	agaricomycetes	agaricales	lyophyllaceae
Cantharellula umbonata	LC		Stable	basidiomycota	agaricomycetes	agaricales	tricholomataceae
Clitopilus prunulus	LC		Stable	basidiomycota	agaricomycetes	agaricales	entolomataceae
Coprinus comatus	LC		Stable	basidiomycota	agaricomycetes	agaricales	agaricaceae
Cortinarius caperatus	LC		Stable	basidiomycota	agaricomycetes	agaricales	cortinariaceae
Everniastrum nepalense	LC		Unknown	ascomycota	lecanoromycetes	lecanorales	parmeliaceae
Flammulina velutipes	LC		Stable	basidiomycota	agaricomycetes	agaricales	physalacriaceae
Gomphidius glutinosus	LC		Stable	basidiomycota	agaricomycetes	boletales	gomphidiaceae
Gomphidius roseus	LC		Stable	basidiomycota	agaricomycetes	boletales	gomphidiaceae
Hericium erinaceus	LC		Decreasing	basidiomycota	agaricomycetes	russulales	hericiaceae
Hydnellum cyanopodium	LC		Decreasing	basidiomycota	agaricomycetes	thelephorales	bankeraceae
Hydnum repandum	LC		Stable	basidiomycota	agaricomycetes	cantharellales	hydnaceae
Hygrophorus hypothejus	LC		Stable	basidiomycota	agaricomycetes	agaricales	hygrophoraceae
Hygrophorus olivaceoalbus	LC		Stable	basidiomycota	agaricomycetes	agaricales	hygrophoraceae
Hypholoma capnoides	LC		Stable	basidiomycota	agaricomycetes	agaricales	hymenogastraceae
Imleria badia	LC		Stable	basidiomycota	agaricomycetes	boletales	boletaceae
Kuehneromyces mutabilis	LC		Stable	basidiomycota	agaricomycetes	agaricales	strophariaceae
Lactarius rubidus	LC		Stable	basidiomycota	agaricomycetes	russulales	russulaceae
Lycoperdon perlatum	LC		Stable	basidiomycota	agaricomycetes	agaricales	agaricaceae
Mitrulinia sp. nov. 'New Zealand'	LC		Unknown	ascomycota	leotiomycetes	helotiales	sclerotiniaceae
Montagnea radiosa	LC		Unknown	basidiomycota	agaricomycetes	agaricales	agaricaceae
Orbiliopsis callistea	LC		Unknown	ascomycota	leotiomycetes	helotiales	incertae sedis
Phaeophyscia hispidula	LC		Unknown	ascomycota	lecanoromycetes	teloschistales	physciaceae
Phylloporus pelletieri	LC		Unknown	basidiomycota	agaricomycetes	boletales	boletaceae
Poronia punctata	LC		Decreasing	ascomycota	sordariomycetes	xylariales	xylariaceae
Russula aeruginea	LC		Stable	basidiomycota	agaricomycetes	russulales	russulaceae
Russula claroflava	LC		Stable	basidiomycota	agaricomycetes	russulales	russulaceae
Russula decolorans	LC		Stable	basidiomycota	agaricomycetes	russulales	russulaceae
Russula galbana	LC		Decreasing	basidiomycota	agaricomycetes	russulales	russulaceae
Russula miniata	LC		Unknown	basidiomycota	agaricomycetes	russulales	russulaceae
Russula paludosa	LC		Stable	basidiomycota	agaricomycetes	russulales	russulaceae
Russula vesca	LC		Stable	basidiomycota	agaricomycetes	russulales	russulaceae
Russula vinosa	LC		Stable	basidiomycota	agaricomycetes	russulales	russulaceae
Squamanita pearsonii	LC		Unknown	basidiomycota	agaricomycetes	agaricales	tricholomataceae
Suillus bovinus	LC		Stable	basidiomycota	agaricomycetes	boletales	suillaceae
Suillus granulatus	LC		Stable	basidiomycota	agaricomycetes	boletales	suillaceae
Suillus grevillei	LC		Stable	basidiomycota	agaricomycetes	boletales	suillaceae
Suillus lakei	LC		Stable	basidiomycota	agaricomycetes	boletales	suillaceae
Suillus luteus	LC		Stable	basidiomycota	agaricomycetes	boletales	suillaceae
Suillus variegatus	LC		Stable	basidiomycota	agaricomycetes	boletales	suillaceae
Amanita mumura	DD		Unknown	basidiomycota	agaricomycetes	agaricales	amanitaceae
Amanita sp. nov. 'zayantensis'	DD		Unknown	basidiomycota	agaricomycetes	agaricales	amanitaceae
Biscogniauxia bartholomaei	DD		Unknown	ascomycota	sordariomycetes	xylariales	xylariaceae
Boletus peckii	DD		Unknown	basidiomycota	agaricomycetes	boletales	boletaceae
Chalciporus aurantiacus	DD		Unknown	basidiomycota	agaricomycetes	boletales	boletaceae
Cordierites acanthophorus	DD		Unknown	ascomycota	leotiomycetes	helotiales	helotiaceae
Cordyceps hauturu	DD		Unknown	ascomycota	sordariomycetes	hypocreales	cordycipitaceae
Cordyceps kirkii	DD		Unknown	ascomycota	sordariomycetes	hypocreales	cordycipitaceae
Cortinarius crypticus	DD		Unknown	basidiomycota	agaricomycetes	agaricales	cortinariaceae
Cortinarius nivalis	DD		Unknown	basidiomycota	agaricomycetes	agaricales	cortinariaceae
Dichomitus newhookii	DD		Unknown	basidiomycota	agaricomycetes	polyporales	polyporaceae
Flammulina stratosa	DD		Unknown	basidiomycota	agaricomycetes	agaricales	physalacriaceae
Geastrum hungaricum	DD		Decreasing	basidiomycota	agaricomycetes	geastrales	geastraceae
Geastrum pouzarii	DD		Unknown	basidiomycota	agaricomycetes	geastrales	geastraceae
Lactarius cordovaensis	DD		Unknown	basidiomycota	agaricomycetes	russulales	russulaceae
Lepiota viridigleba	DD		Unknown	basidiomycota	agaricomycetes	agaricales	agaricaceae
Limacella solidipes	DD		Unknown	basidiomycota	agaricomycetes	agaricales	amanitaceae
Meiorganum neocaledonicum	DD		Unknown	basidiomycota	agaricomycetes	boletales	paxillaceae
Melanoleuca clelandii	DD		Unknown	basidiomycota	agaricomycetes	agaricales	tricholomataceae
Oudemansiella turbinispora	DD		Unknown	basidiomycota	agaricomycetes	agaricales	physalacriaceae
Resinoporia piceata	DD		Decreasing	basidiomycota	agaricomycetes	polyporales	fomitopsidaceae
Thuemenidium sp. nov. 'Australasia'	DD		Unknown	ascomycota	geoglossomycetes	geoglossales	geoglossaceae

== NZTCS listings ==

- Extinct: 0 species (0.0%)
- Nationally Critical: 29 species (1.9%)
- Nationally Endangered: 0 species (0.0%)
- Nationally Vulnerable: 0 species (0.0%)
- Serious Decline: 1 species (0.1%)
- Gradual Decline: 10 species (0.7%)
- Sparse: 5 species (0.3%)
- Range Restricted: 0 species (0.0%)
- Data Deficient: 1,447 species (97.0%)
Species of Fungi (NZTCS, 2002)
- 1512 extant species are listed
  - 1447 are Data Deficient
  - 65 are Threatened
    - 49 of those Threatened are Nationally Critical
    - 1 of those Threatened are Serious Declime
    - 10 of those Threatened are Gradual Decline
    - 49 of those Threatened are Acutely Threatened
    - 11 of those Threatened are Chronically Threatened
    - 5 of those Threatened are At risk
    - 0 of those Evaluated are Extinct

=== Nationally Critical ===
- Austrogaster novaezelandiae - One Location
- Berggrenia cyclospora - One Location
- Cantharellus elsae - One Location
- Chalciporus aurantiacus
- Chlorovibrissea bicolor - One Location
- Chlorovibrissea melanochlora - One Location
- Chlorovibrissea tasmanica - One Location
- Claustula fischeri K.M. Curtis, 1926 - Fischer’s egg, Data Poor, Stable, Threatened Overseas, One Location
- Colpoma nothofagi
- Cordierites acanthophora - One Location
- Dichomitus newhookii
- Ganoderma sp. “Awaroa” - (Pukatea bracket) Human Induced
- Gomphus dingleyae - One Location
- Gomphus novaezelandiae - One Location
- Gyroporus castaneus - One Location
- Hysterangium youngii - One Location
- Inonotus chondromyelus
- Lactarius maruiaensis - One Location
- Phallobata alba
- Phanerochaete citrina - One Location
- Phanerochaete corymbata - One Location
- Phanerochaete luteoaurantiaca - One Location
- Polyporus septosporus P.K. Buchanan & Ryvarden, 1998 - Septate-spored polypore, Data Poor, Threatened Overseas, One Location
- Puccinia embergeriae McKenzie & P.R. Johnst. ined. - Chatham Island sow thistle rust, Stable, One Location
- Puccinia freycinetiae - One Location
- Ramaria aureorhiza - One Location
- Ramaria avellaneovertex - One Location
- Ramaria basirobusta - One Location
- Ramaria junquilleovertex - One Location
- Ramaria piedmontiana - One Location
- Ramariopsis avellanea - One Location
- Ramariopsis avellaneoinversa - One Location
- Ramariopsis tortuosa - One Location
- Russula inquinata - Data Poor, One Location
- Russula littoralis - One Location
- Russula miniata - Data Poor, One Location
- Russula papakaiensis - Data Poor, One Location
- Russula pleurogena - One Location
- Russula solitaria - Data Poor, One Location
- Russula vivida McNabb, 1973 - Data Poor
- Sarcosoma orientale
- Squamanita squarrulosa - One Location
- Thaxterogaster cartilagineus - One Location
- Undescribed genus of Trichocomaceae - Data Poor
- Uredo chathamica - One Location
- Uredo salicorniae
- Volvariella surrecta - One Location
- Xylaria wellingtonensis - One Location
- Xylaria zealandica - One Location

=== Serious decline ===
- Melampsora novaezelandiae

=== Gradual Decline ===
- Diaporthe sp. 1 - Conservation Dependent, Human Induced
- Diaporthe sp. 2 - Conservation Dependent, Human Induced
- Glonium sp. - Conservation Dependent, Extreme Fluctuations
- Leucostoma sp. 1 - Conservation Dependent, Human Induced
- Leucostoma sp. 2 - Conservation Dependent, Human Induced
- Pestalotiopsis sp. - Conservation Dependent, Extreme Fluctuations
- Phomopsis sp. - Conservation Dependent, One Location
- Propolis desmoschoeni - Conservation Dependent, Extreme Fluctuations
- Seimatosporium sp. - Conservation Dependent, Extreme Fluctuations
- Truncatella sp. - Conservation Dependent, Extreme Fluctuations

=== Sparse ===
- Asterinella intensa
- Lophodermium kaikawakae
- Mycosphaerella sp.
- Patellaria sp.
- Phyllosticta sp. - Extreme Fluctuations

== See also ==
- Conservation of fungi
- List of Chromista by conservation status
- Ophiocordyceps sinensis
