= Blue-foot =

Blue-foot or blue foot can refer to any of three unrelated mushroom species:

- Clitocybe nuda, commonly known as the wood blewit
- Hydnellum cyanopodium
- Psilocybe caerulipes
