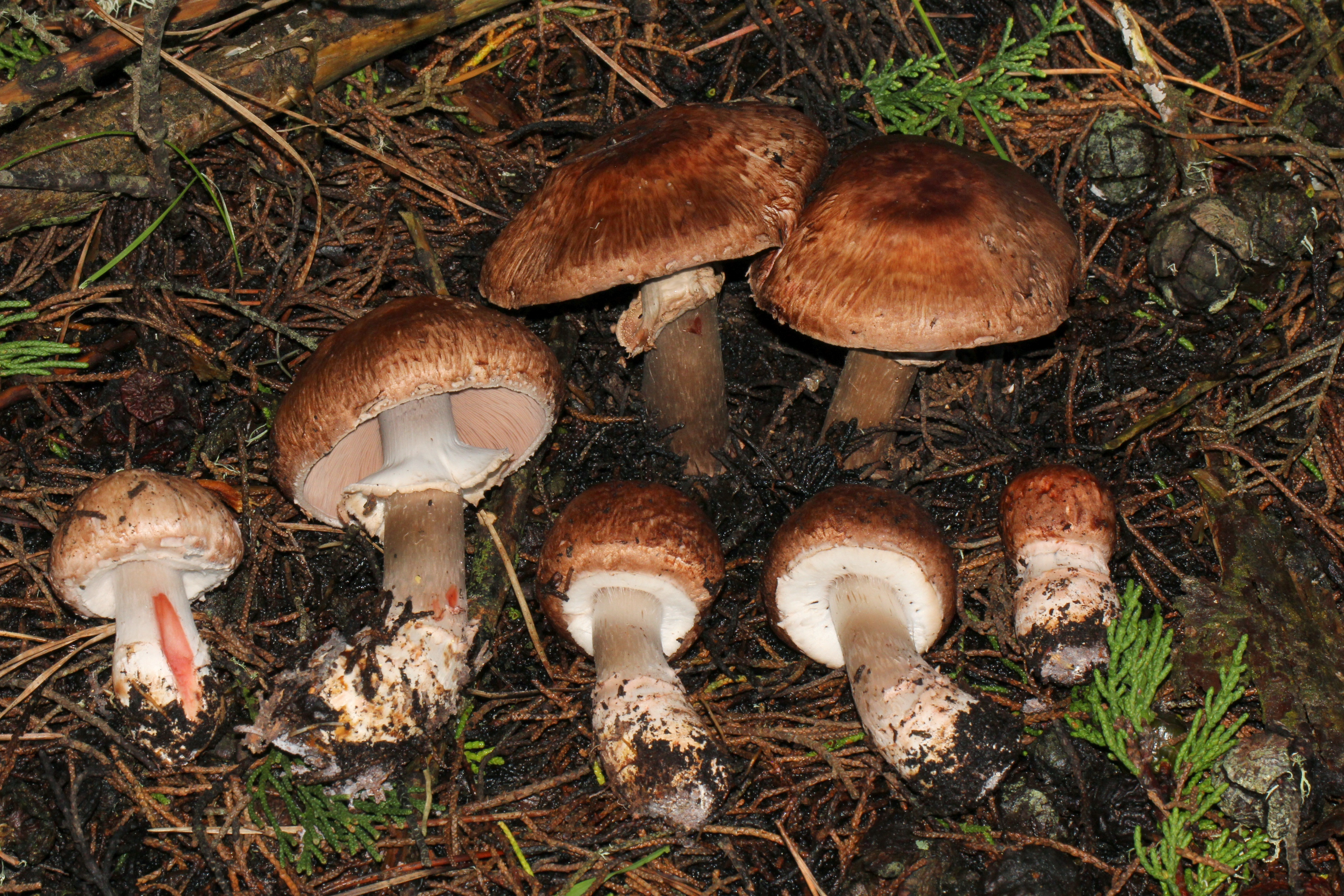

Scientific classification
- Kingdom: Fungi
- Division: Basidiomycota
- Class: Agaricomycetes
- Order: Agaricales
- Family: Agaricaceae
- Genus: Agaricus
- Species: A. brunneofibrillosus

Binomial name
- Agaricus brunneofibrillosus Kerrigan (2016)

Synonyms
- Agaricus fuscofibrillosus sensu Kerrigan (1986)

= Agaricus brunneofibrillosus =

Species of fungus

Agaricus brunneofibrillosus
- Mycological characteristics
- Gills on hymenium
- Cap is convex or flat
- Hymenium is free
- Stipe has a ring
- Spore print is brown
- Ecology is saprotrophic
- Edibility is choice

Agaricus brunneofibrillosus, commonly known as the dusky mushroom or bleeding agaricus, is a species of fungus in the family Agaricaceae. It has a medium to dark brown cap up to 6 cm (2 1/4 in) in diameter with brownish fibrillose scales that darken in age. The tightly packed gills are initially cream colored before becoming pinkish, lilac-gray, and finally brownish as the spores mature. The stout stem is enlarged to bulbous at the base, which has one or more brown bands, and a white, membranous ring.

== Taxonomy ==
The species was first studied by Rick Kerrigan, who studied collections from the California coast and identified the collections as belonging to Agaricus fuscofibrillosus (F. H. Møller) Pilát, a species originally described from northern and central Europe. Later investigation by Kerrigan revealed that the California population was a different species from the European one, and in fact, belonged to a different subsection of Agaricus entirely. In 2016, as part of a larger monograph on the Agaricus species of North America, Kerrigan described Agaricus brunneofibrillosus as a separate species. The epithet brunneofibrillosus refers to the brown color and fibrillose texture of the pileus, as well as the distinction from A. fuscofibrillosus.

European Agaricus fuscofibrillosus is now treated as a synonym for Agaricus langei.

== Description ==
The cap is initially convex before flattening out, and reaches a diameter of 5–13 cm (2–5 in). The cap surface is dry, smooth, reddish-brown to coco-brown with silky fibrils or sometimes with flattened scales and often has a slight umbo. In maturity, the fibrils usually darken to walnut brown. The flesh is white and does not change color in KOH. When bruised or injured, the flesh turns bright red within 30 seconds, and later fades to brown. The odor of crushed flesh is mild and mushroomy.

The gills are initially cream colored to pale pinkish or pinkish-gray before becoming brown, then dark chocolate-brown when the spores mature. In maturity, the gills are free from attachment to the stem, packed close together, with little intervening space between them. The stem is 4–15 cm (1 1/2–6 in) long and 1.5–2.5 cm (1/2–1 in) thick, usually with an enlarged or bulbous base that has one or more coca-brown colored bands. Firm, smooth, and lacking the scales found on the cap, the stem is colored white or discolors bright red or dingy brownish in age or after handling. The partial veil is membranous, white, and forms a thin skirtlike ring on the upper portion of the stem.

The spore print is chocolate brown. The smooth, thick-walled spores are elliptical, and typically measure 5–6.5 by 3.5-4 μm. Cystidia on the gill edge (cheilocystidia) are scattered, club-shaped to cylindric and have dimensions of up to 22 by 7 μm.

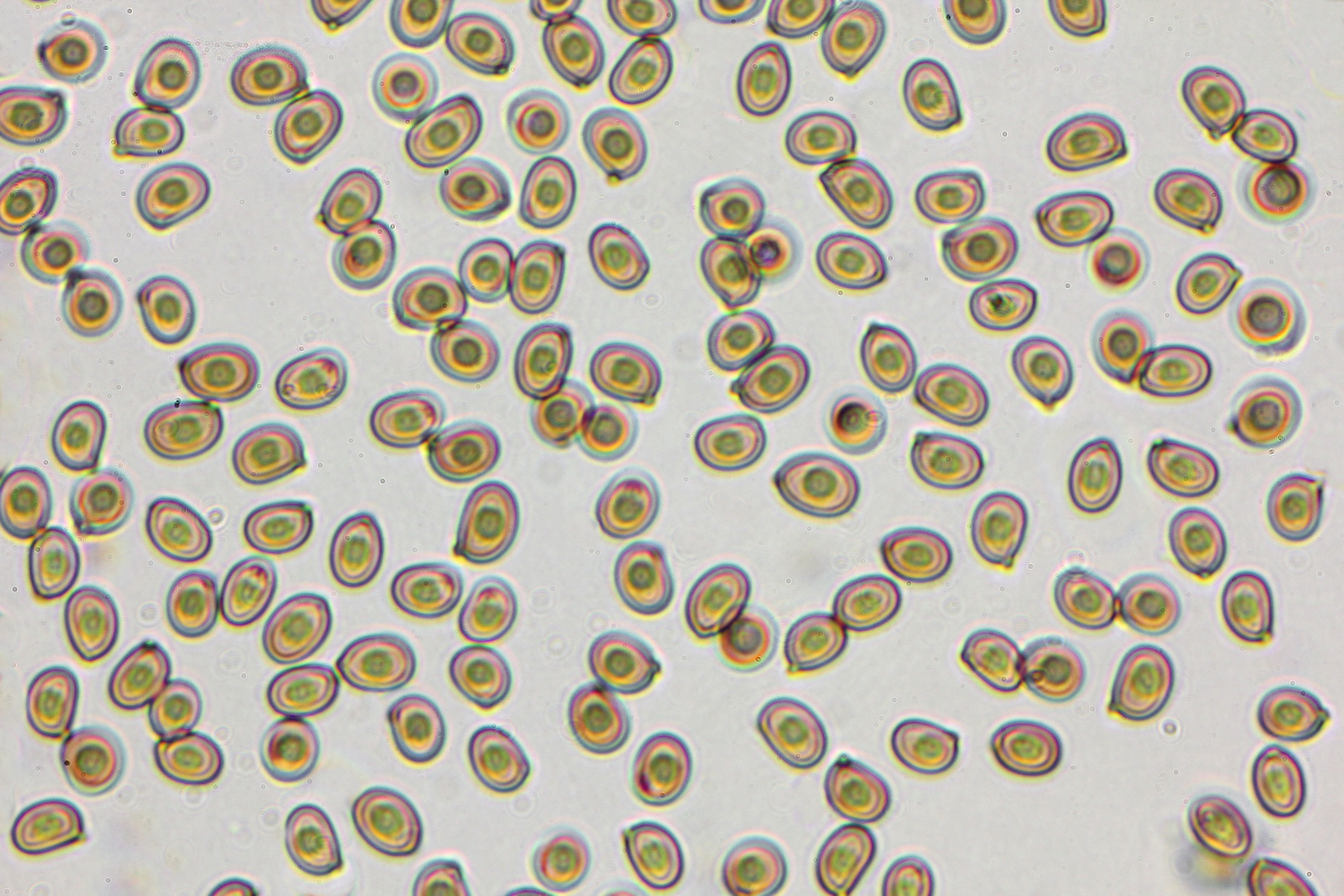
Spores 1000x

=== Similar species ===
Agaricus amicosus is similar to and a close relative of A. brunneofibrillosus. It differs considerably in geography, being endemic to spruce and fir forests of the Rocky Mountains, but like A. brunneofibrillosus, shows a clear preference for growth on deep leaf litter.

Agaricus pattersoniae closely resembles A. fuscofibrillosus but is larger and the cap has appressed brown squamules and is not fibrillose. A. brunneofibrillosus is also similar to A. fuscovelatus, but that species has a more conical cap with brownish scales and a dark brown ring.

It could resemble species close to the poisonous Inocybe pudica, which is usually smaller.

== Habitat and distribution ==
The fruit bodies appear in the late fall and winter, where they grow scattered or in groups in deep leaf litter under Monterey cypresses or rarely under other trees. The mushroom is found in coastal California and is most common in the Monterey and San Francisco Bay Areas.

== Uses ==
The mushroom is edible.

== See also ==
- List of Agaricus species
