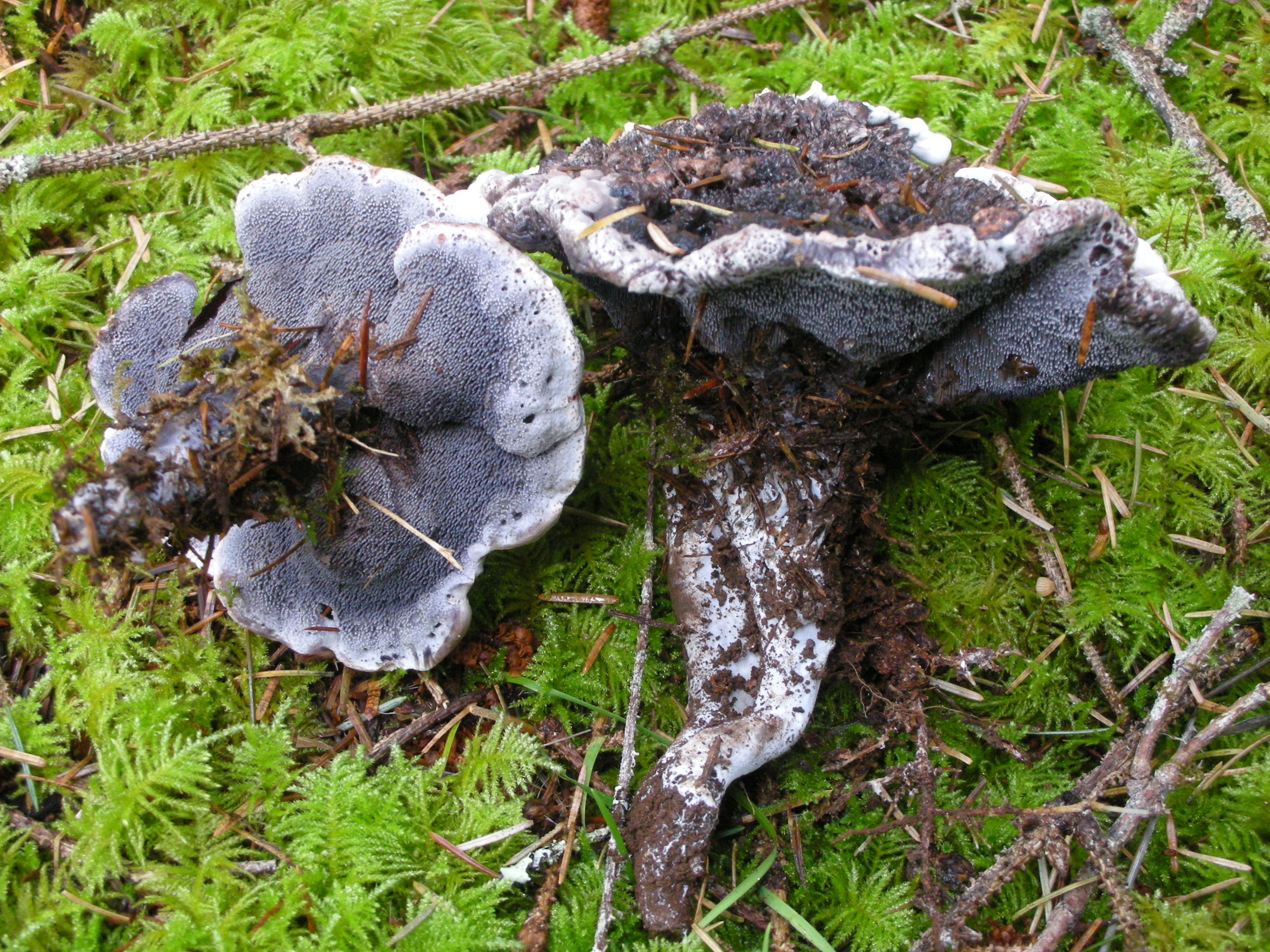

Conservation status
- Least Concern (IUCN 3.1)

Scientific classification
- Kingdom: Fungi
- Division: Basidiomycota
- Class: Agaricomycetes
- Order: Thelephorales
- Family: Bankeraceae
- Genus: Hydnellum
- Species: H. cyanopodium

Binomial name
- Hydnellum cyanopodium K.A.Harrison (1964)

= Hydnellum cyanopodium =

Species of fungus

Hydnellum cyanopodium, commonly known as the blue foot or bleeding blue tooth, is an inedible fungus in the family Bankeraceae. It occurs in the Pacific Northwest region of North America.

== Taxonomy ==
The fungus was described as new to science to Canadian mycologist Kenneth A. Harrison in 1964. The type was collected by Alexander H. Smith in Crescent City, California, in November 1937. It is kept at University of Michigan Herbarium. Harrison considered this species—in addition to H. cruentum and H. scleropodium—to be members of the stirps (species thought to be descendants of a common ancestor) he called "cruentum". This stirps is characterized by the presence of red juice drops on young fruit bodies, bluish spines, and similar spore morphology.

== Description ==
The fruit bodies have irregularly shaped caps measuring 4–8 cm (1.6–3.1 in) in diameter. The cap surface is rough with small hard points, has ridges, and is a dark blue-wine red color that changes later to lavender. The outer cap edge turns whitish with age. Young fruit bodies are covered with drops of red juice. The flesh has a woody or cork-like texture, and a strong, "disagreeable" odor and taste.

The spines on the underside of the caps are up to 3 mm long with a color ranging from initially grayish violet blue to wine-blue with brownish tints, to dull grayish-green. The stipe measures 2–5 cm (0.8–2.0 in) long by 1–2 cm (0.4–0.8 in) thick, and tends to root into the ground. Its color is deep bluish-black (with similarly colored flesh within) with a whitish mycelium at the base. Staining the spines or the cap or stipe flesh with potassium hydroxide turns it blue-green. Spores are angular, cross-shaped with four to six thick points, and measure 4–5 by 3.5–4.5 μm. The spore shape has been likened to jacks.

=== Similar species ===
The lookalike species Hydnellum caeruleum can be readily distinguished from H. cyanopodium by its lack of a medicinal odor, the absence of red juice drops, and the orange to rusty-brown color of its stipe. H. caeruleum can be further distinguished microscopically by its roughly spherical spores. H. scleropodium has a smoother texture and more pallid colors. H. cruentum, found in Nova Scotia, Canada, has an odor that has been described as "medicinal".

== Habitat and distribution ==
Hydnellum cyanopodium fruits singly, in groups, or with fruit bodies fused together. It occurs under Sitka spruce (Picea sitchensis) and pine (Pinus spp.) in California. The fungus is also found in Oregon.

== See also ==
- List of fungi by conservation status
