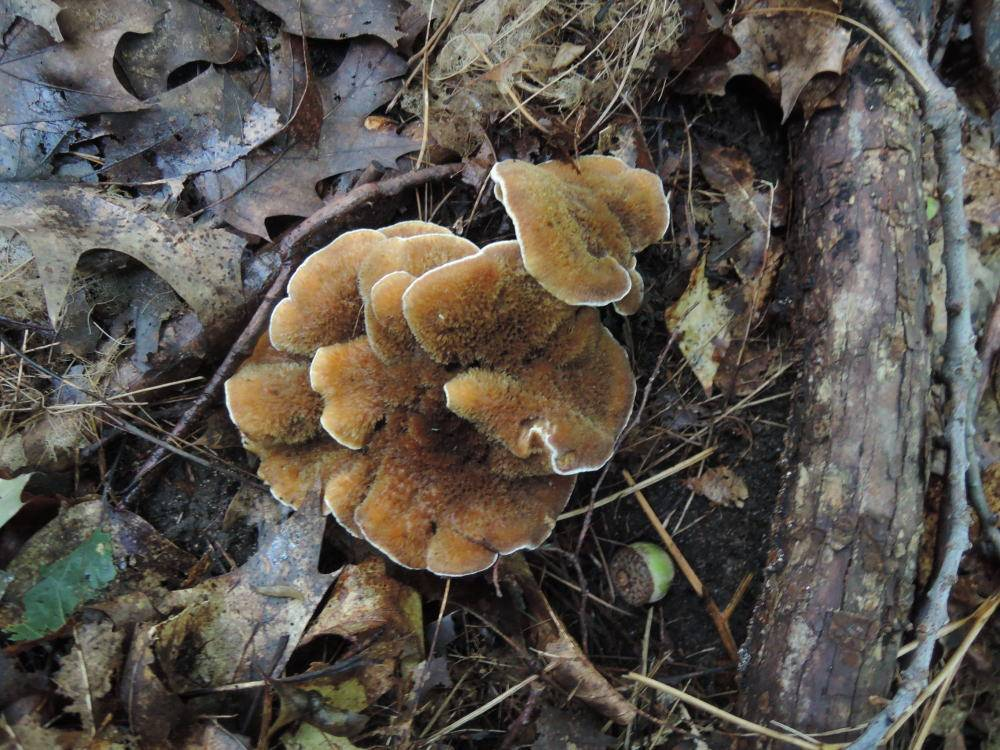

Conservation status
- Vulnerable (IUCN 3.1)

Scientific classification
- Kingdom: Fungi
- Division: Basidiomycota
- Class: Agaricomycetes
- Order: Thelephorales
- Family: Bankeraceae
- Genus: Hydnellum
- Species: H. mirabile

Binomial name
- Hydnellum mirabile (Fr.) P.Karst. (1879)

Synonyms
- List: Hydnum mirabile Fr. (1863); Hydnum acre Quél. (1878); Calodon mirabilis Fr.) P.Kumm. (1882); Sarcodon acris (Quél.) Quél. (1886); Phaeodon acer (Quél.) Henn. (1898); Phaeodon mirabilis (Fr.) Henn. (1898); Hydnellum acre (Quél.) Donk (1933)

= Hydnellum mirabile =

Species of tooth fungus

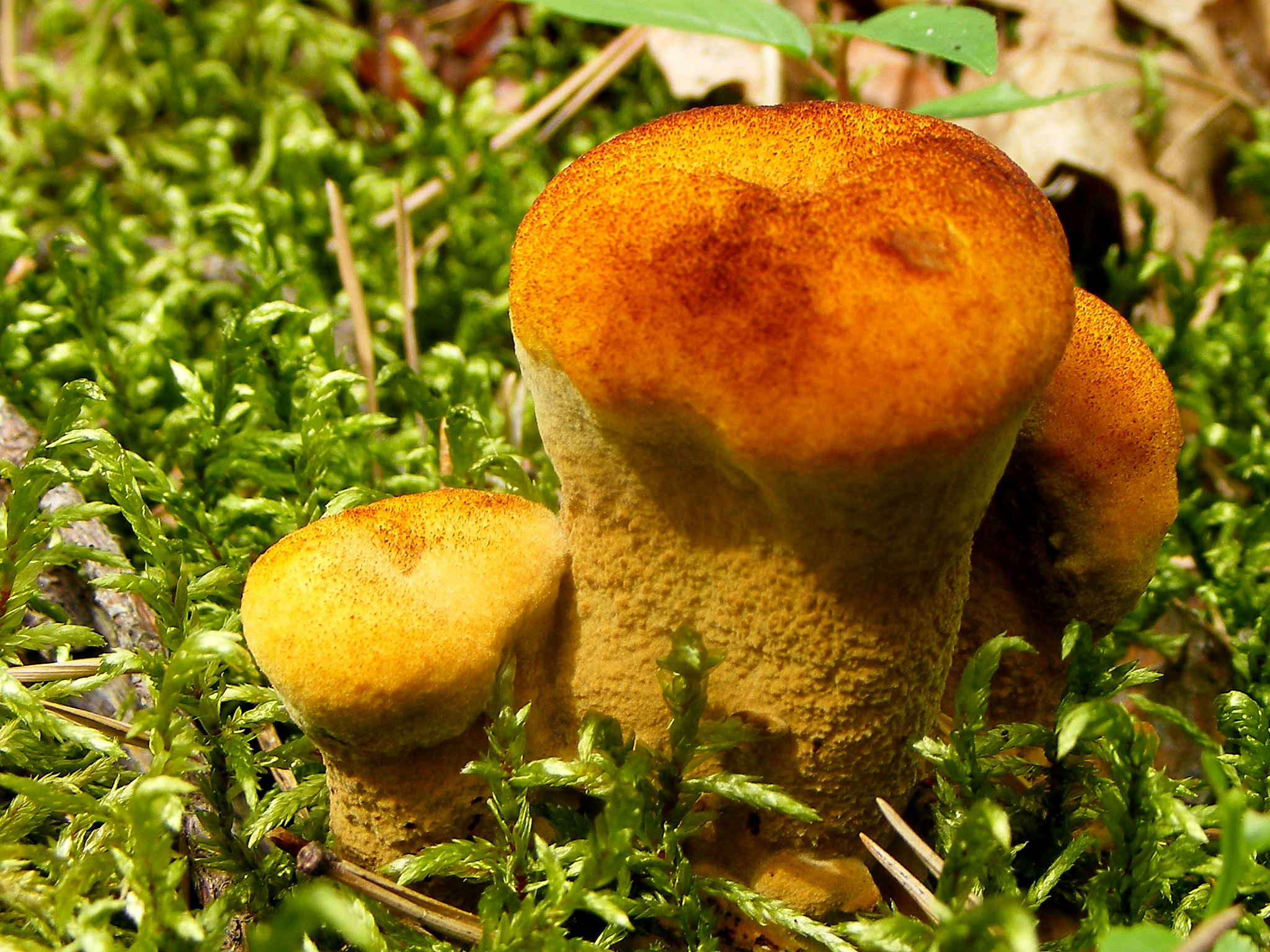
Due to morphological similarities, Hydnellum mirabile can be misidentified as this species Hydnellum compactum

Hydnellum mirabile is an inedible species of tooth fungus in the family Bankeraceae. The species is classified as Vulnerable according to IUCN criteria due to substantial habitat loss and ongoing threats. H. mirabile can be used as an indicator species for biodiversity and overall forest health.

== Description ==
Caps of Hydnellum mirabile are brownish to dark brown with yellow edges, and have a hairy surface. They are funnel-shaped. The stipe measures 10–50 by 10–25 mm and is dark brown and hairy at the base. On the cap underside (the hymenium) hang brownish spines with paler tips. The spores are roughly spherical with tubercles on the surface, and measure 5–7 by 4.5–6 μm. It has a weakly astringent taste. The spore print is buff brown.

== Ecology ==
H. mirabile is found in Europe, where it grows in old-growth, coniferous forests on base-rich or chalky soils. This rare fungus forms ectomycorrhizal associations primarily with the Norway Spruce (Picea abies) and occasionally with Scots Pine (Pinus Sylvestris). H. mirabile requires specific ecological conditions that limit the species' realized niche. The fungi is often referred to as an indicator species for biodiversity because it can often be found growing amongst other rare species of fungi that also favor environments with lower levels of disturbances.

== Conservation ==
Hydnellum mirabile faces significant conservation challenges across its range. The species is classified as Vulnerable according to IUCN criteria due to substantial habitat loss and ongoing threats. Population assessments indicate fewer than 500 known localities throughout Europe, with the primary concentration in Fennoscandia, where small populations typically consist of only 1–10 individuals per site. The total mature population is estimated at fewer than 5,000 individuals.

The species' decline directly correlates with the reduction of old-growth spruce forests on productive, base-rich soils, habitats that have decreased by 30–50% over the past 50 years. Clearcutting forestry practices pose the most significant threat to H. mirabile, as the species disappears following such disturbances and appears unable to recolonize younger forest stands. In Central Europe, cumulative air pollution, particularly nitrogen deposition, further threatens remaining populations.

Conservation status varies across the fungus's range, with H. mirabile listed as regionally extinct in the Czech Republic, endangered in France and Sweden, and vulnerable in Finland and Norway. Despite serving as an indicator species, few sites containing H. mirabile receive formal protection as nature reserves. Effective conservation will require the preservation of appropriate old-growth forest habitats, as this specialized fungus cannot survive under conventional forestry management regimes.

== See also ==
- List of fungi by conservation status
