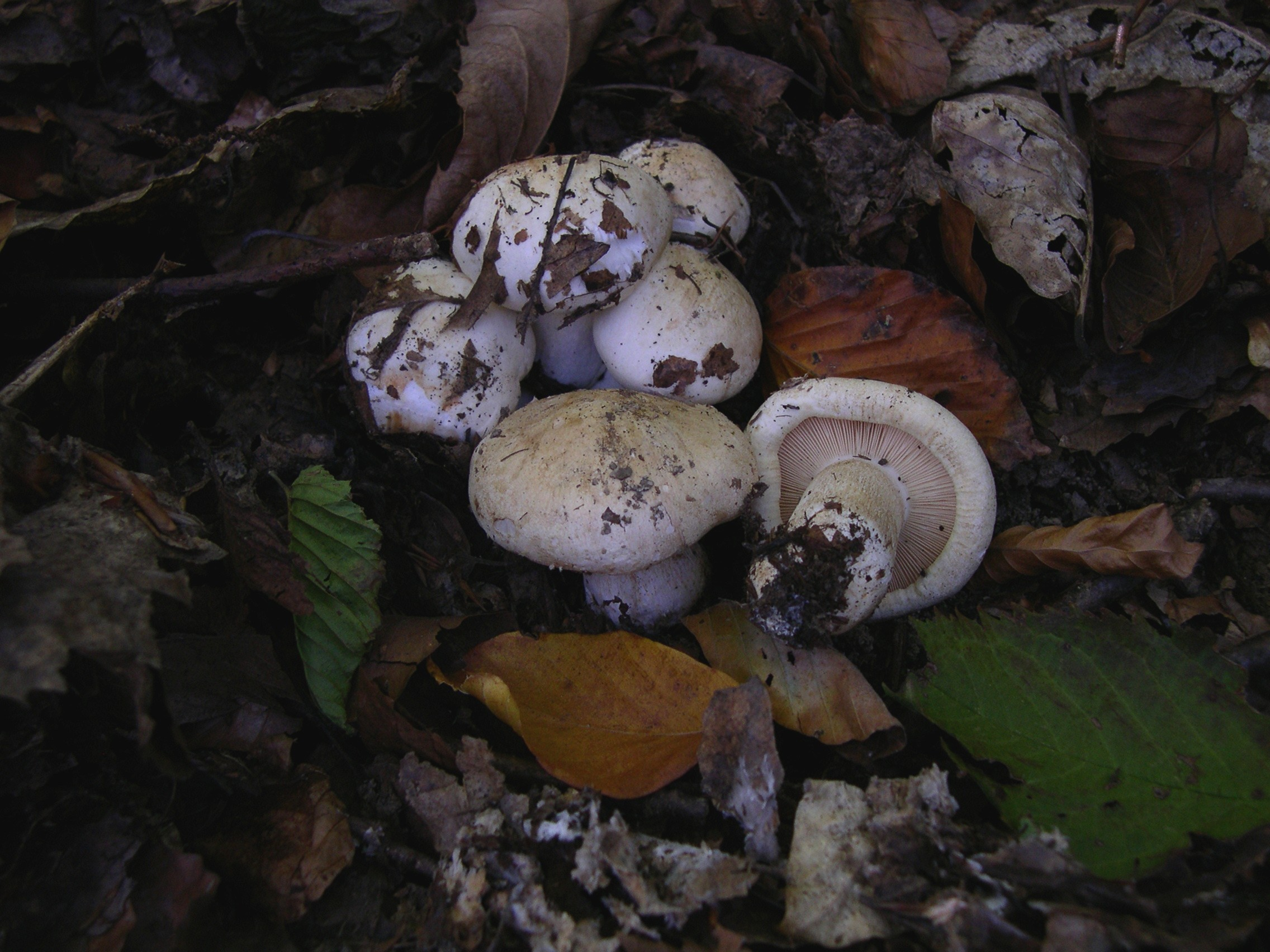

Conservation status
- Vulnerable (IUCN 3.1)

Scientific classification
- Kingdom: Fungi
- Division: Basidiomycota
- Class: Agaricomycetes
- Order: Agaricales
- Family: Tricholomataceae
- Genus: Tricholoma
- Species: T. acerbum

Binomial name
- Tricholoma acerbum (Bull.) Quél. (1872)

Synonyms
- Agaricus acerbus Bull. (1792); Gyrophila acerba (Bull.) Quél. (1886)

= Tricholoma acerbum =

Species of fungus

Tricholoma acerbum is a mushroom of the agaric family Tricholomataceae. It is found in Europe and North America, in temperate, deciduous oak forests.

It has mycorrhizal associations with oak, chestnut, linden and hazel trees. In southern Europe, it has been reported to grow in mesotrophic to base-rich, though not in calcereous soils, though in Norway and Russia, it has been observed in calcareous soils.

It is listed as endangered to critically endangered in various countries in northern, western and central Europe. It is threatened by deforestation, loss of forest grazing and the shift in silviculture from oak to conifer species, which causes its habitat to be fragmented and or entirely degraded. The IUCN recommends oak forest reserves to be set aside, and for cattle grazing to be reintroduced in many cases, to assure good habitat quality for Tricholoma acerbum.

It is considered edible.

== See also ==
- List of North American Tricholoma species
- List of Tricholoma species
- List of fungi by conservation status
