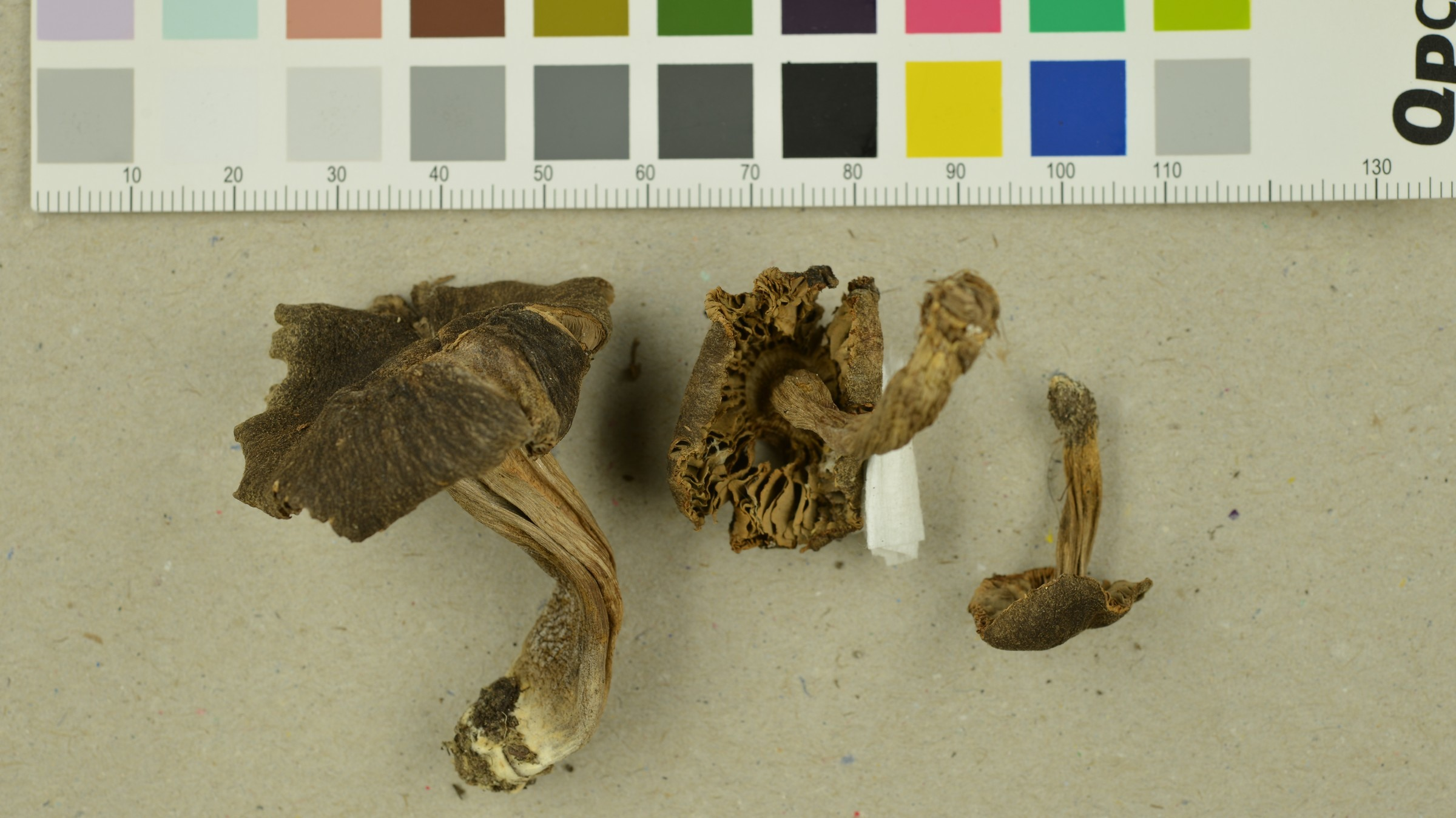
- Tricholoma borgsjoeënse

Conservation status
- Vulnerable (IUCN 3.1)

Scientific classification
- Kingdom: Fungi
- Division: Basidiomycota
- Class: Agaricomycetes
- Order: Agaricales
- Family: Tricholomataceae
- Genus: Tricholoma
- Species: T. borgsjoeënse

Binomial name
- Tricholoma borgsjoeënse Jacobsson & Muskos (2006)

= Tricholoma borgsjoeënse =

Species of mushroom-forming fungus

Tricholoma borgsjoeënse, or borgsjömusseron, is a mushroom-forming fungus of the agaric genus Tricholoma. It is found in Norway, Sweden, and Finland, where it grows among moss in Norway spruce forest. It was described as new to science in 2006. The fungi is brown in appearance and is similar to the brown mushroom. The borgsjömusseron tricholoma has been documented to live in several different European countries. These include Sweden, Norway and Finland, as well as small pockets located in Czechia and Slovakia.

== Taxonomy ==
Tricholoma borgsjoeënse was formally described as a new species in 2004 by the mycologists Eva Jacobsson and Siw Muskos, based on material collected in the parish of Borgsjö, Medelpad, central Sweden. The holotype (Muskos 05‑024) is deposited in the Gothenburg herbarium (GB), with isotypes distributed at other European institutions. The epithet borgsjoeënse honours the locality where the first specimens were discovered.

Molecular phylogenetics analysis of the nuclear internal transcribed spacer (ITS) region places T. borgsjoeënse in section Terre of the genus Tricholoma, a group characterised by tomentose to scurfy pileus surfaces and the complete absence of clamp connections on hyphae. In the single most parsimonious tree, it forms a strongly supported clade (100 % bootstrap) with T. atroviolaceum, and clusters with T. myomyces with moderate support (71 %), indicating close genetic affinity to these species. Morphologically it is set apart by its darker, uniformly tomentose cap and broader spores compared to T. atroviolaceum, and by its firmer stipe and lack of violet‑tinged basidia that distinguish it from T. myomyces.

== Description ==
Tricholoma borgsjoeënse produces medium to large basidiocarps (fruiting bodies) with a distinct dark, woolly cap and slender stipe. The cap (pileus) measures 35–88 mm across when mature, initially presenting an obtusely conical to broadly bell-shaped profile before flattening to a plano‑convex surface, sometimes bearing a low central bump (umbo). Its tomentose (woolly) or occasionally fibrillose (thread‑like) surface is dark greyish‑brown to blackish‑brown, paling towards the margin with age or under dry conditions. The cap edge may become spotted with blackish discolouration when handled.

The gills (lamellae) are moderately crowded to somewhat subdistant, up to 12 mm deep, emarginate (notched) where they meet the stipe, and transition from pale brownish‑grey in youth to a richer brown at maturity. When injured, the gill edges often blacken. The stipe stands 55–105 mm tall and 10–17 mm wide, nearly cylindrical or somewhat club‑shaped, with greyish fibrillose surface that gradually fades to pale yellowish towards the base, especially when buried in deep moss. Flesh (context) in the cap is grey near the margin and centre, passing through dark grey marbling into the upper stipe, then paling towards the base. No cortina (partial veil remnants) is evident. The smell is farinaceous—reminiscent of fresh flour—and the taste mild to faintly bitter.

Microscopically, spores are broadly ellipsoid to ovoid, smooth, hyaline (colourless), and neither amyloid nor dextrinoid, measuring 7.5–9 by 5–6 μm. Basidia are slenderly clavate (club‑shaped), four‑spored, 36–48 by 8–10 μm, and clamp connections are entirely absent. The cap cuticle (pileipellis) is a cutis of parallel, strongly septate hyphae, 15–30 by 8–20 μm, with thick walls and dark incrusting pigments; beneath this lies a subpellis of more inflated, weakly pigmented hyphae. No clamp connections occur in any tissue.

== Habitat and distribution ==
Tricholoma borgsjoeënse grows in boreal coniferous woodlands, favouring moist, moss‑covered soils in old‑growth Norway spruce (Picea abies) stands. Fruit bodies appear singly or in small groups or rows from August to September on nutrient‑rich, undisturbed forest floors, often emerging deep within the moss layer. The species forms ectomycorrhizal associations exclusively with spruce, with no evidence of symbiosis with pine or other hosts.

At the time of its original description, T. borgsjoeënse was known from at least six localities in the province of Medelpad, central Sweden, including the type collection at Julåsen. Subsequent records—among them Finnish specimens and additional finds in Norway—demonstrate that its range extends throughout Fennoscandian spruce forests. Beyond Scandinavia, a single fruit body was reported from the Czech Republic in 2012, and surveys in Slovakia confirmed two localities, one in the Low Tatras (Nízke Tatry), representing the southernmost European record for the species. While initially associated with virgin‑like boreal spruce woodland, Czech and Slovak collections arose in managed Norway spruce stands, indicating that T. borgsjoeënse tolerates both natural and cultured forests. Reported substrates span calcareous soils, acidic paragneiss bedrock, sandstone outcrops and deluvial sediments derived from quartzites and quartz sandstones; soil pH as low as 3.7 has been measured at one Slovak site.

== See also ==
- List of Tricholoma species
- List of fungi by conservation status
