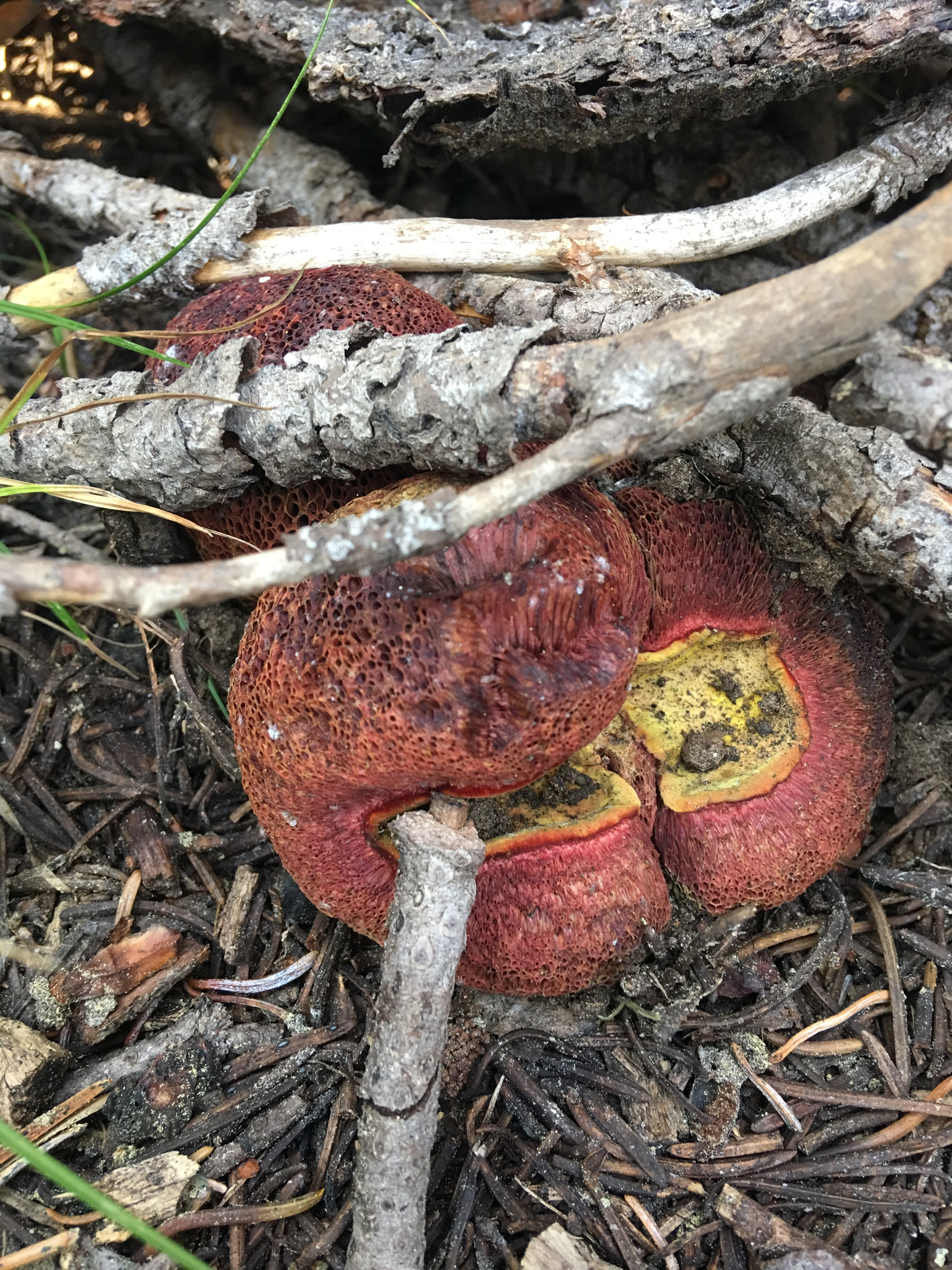

Scientific classification
- Kingdom: Fungi
- Division: Basidiomycota
- Class: Agaricomycetes
- Order: Boletales
- Family: Boletaceae
- Genus: Gastroboletus
- Species: G. amyloideus

Binomial name
- Gastroboletus amyloideus Thiers (1969)

= Gastroboletus amyloideus =

Species of fungus

Gastroboletus amyloideus is a species of fungus in the family Boletaceae. The species was first described scientifically in 1969 by American mycologist Harry Delbert Thiers. Characterized by its amyloid spore staining reaction, the fungus is found in California.
