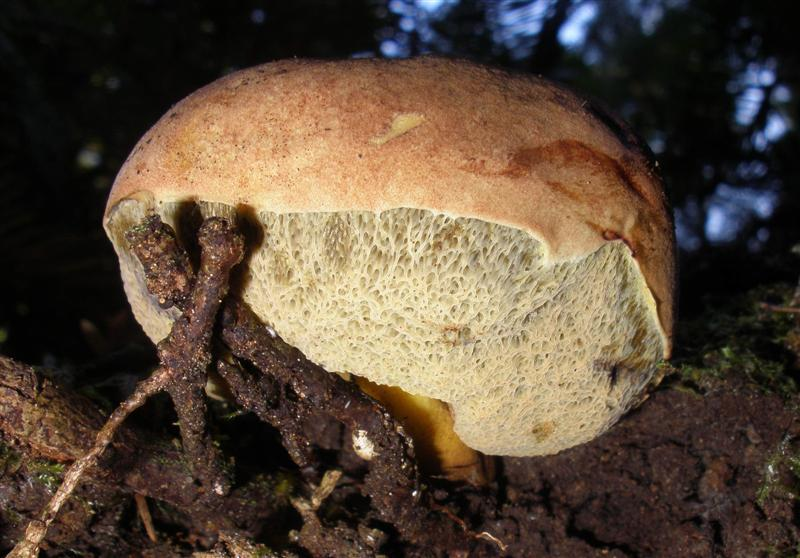
- Gastroboletus turbinatus

Scientific classification
- Kingdom: Fungi
- Division: Basidiomycota
- Class: Agaricomycetes
- Order: Boletales
- Family: Boletaceae
- Genus: Gastroboletus; Lohwag (1926)

Type species
- Gastroboletus boedijnii Lohwag (1926)

= Gastroboletus =

Genus of fungi

Gastroboletus is a genus of fungi in the family Boletaceae. Species in the genus have misshapen caps, poorly developed or absent stipes, and are often buried or partially buried. Gastroboletus has tubes arranged irregularly, rather than vertically as in typical boletes. The edibility of most species is unknown, and those known to be edible are not highly rated.

== Species ==
- Gastroboletus amyloideus
- Gastroboletus boedijnii
- Gastroboletus brunneus
- Gastroboletus citrinobrunneus
- Gastroboletus dinoffii
- Gastroboletus doii
- Gastroboletus fascifer
- Gastroboletus molinae
- Gastroboletus thibetanus — China
- Gastroboletus turbinatus
- Gastroboletus valdivianus
- Gastroboletus vividus
- Gastroboletus xerocomoides
