= Rhizopogon alexsmithii =

Conservation status
- Endangered (IUCN 3.1)

- Imperiled (NatureServe)

Scientific classification
- Kingdom: Fungi
- Division: Basidiomycota
- Class: Agaricomycetes
- Order: Boletales
- Family: Rhizopogonaceae
- Genus: Rhizopogon
- Species: R. alexsmithii

Binomial name
- Rhizopogon alexsmithii (Trappe) Vizzini & Zotti (2010)

Synonyms
- Alpova alexsmithii Trappe (1975)

Species of fungus

Rhizopogon alexsmithii is an ectomycorrhizal fungus in the order Boletales. Named in honor of American mycologist Alexander H. Smith, it was described as new to science in 1975 by James Trappe. Alfredo Vizzini and Mirca Zotti transferred it to the genus Rhizopogon in 2010.

== See also ==
- List of fungi by conservation status
