= Gastroboletus xerocomoides =

Scientific classification
- Kingdom: Fungi
- Division: Basidiomycota
- Class: Agaricomycetes
- Order: Boletales
- Family: Boletaceae
- Genus: Gastroboletus
- Species: G. xerocomoides

Binomial name
- Gastroboletus xerocomoides Trappe & Thiers (1969)

Species of fungus

Gastroboletus xerocomoides is a species of fungus in the family Boletaceae. The species was first described scientifically in 1969 by American mycologists Harry Delbert Thiers and James Trappe. It is found in California, usually near Red Fir trees (Abies magnifica).

== See also ==
- List of North American boletes
