= Conservation of fungi =

Fungi are considered to be in urgent need of conservation by the British Mycological Society on the grounds that it is a traditionally neglected taxon which has legal protection in few countries. Current threats to fungi include destruction of forests worldwide, habitat fragmentation, changes in land use, pollution, anthropogenic climate change, and over-exploitation of commercially attractive species. Fungi population status has never been recorded until 2018 by the Royal Botanic Gardens. These surveys relay species information, threats, and current protective policies. Expertise of 210 contributors from 97 institutions in 42 countries contributes to these reports.

The Species Survival Commission of the IUCN has five specialist groups dealing with the conservation of fungi.

- Chytrid, Zygomycete, Downy Mildew and Slime Mold Specialist Group
- Cup-fungus, Truffle and Ally Specialist Group
- Lichen Specialist Group
- Mushroom, Bracket and Puffball Specialist Group
- Rust and Smut Specialist Group

These groups are overseen by Cátia Canteiro, a plant and fungi specialist at the Indianapolis Zoo’s Global Center for Species Survival (GCSS). Under her leadership, these groups are focusing on Red Listing fungi species in order to build the foundation for conservation efforts.

Lack of knowledge is considered a major concern with a general paucity of comprehensive checklists, even for developed nations. In addition, the criteria for "red-listing" is not specifically designed for fungi and the kinds of data required, viz. population size, lifespan, spatial distribution and population dynamics are poorly known for most fungi. As a result, in practice, indicator species are identified as target foci for the conservation of threatened fungi. The term conservation mycology was coined in a 2018 publication.

== Ecosystem services ==
Fungi provide numerous ecosystem services that are essential in maintaining ecological environments and reducing the effects of climate change. Fungi help facilitate the nutrient cycle and carbon cycle, act as a food source for humans and animals, regulate animals populations, and contribute to the degradation of various pollutants. Fungi are extremely diverse and take numerous approaches in providing these services through unique and complex ecological relationships. Fungi can have mutualistic, symbiotic, or parasitic relationships. 90% of all plant species have been found to associate with fungi. Fungi provide plants with nitrogen, phosphate, and water through decomposition, protect them against pests such as nematodes and arthropods, communicate with plants through their mycelium network, and stimulate plant growth by influencing root development. Many of these mutualistic plant-fungi relationships are established between mycorrhiza fungi. A continuation in the loss of fungi diversity and populations will drastically alter ecosystem identity, processes, and cost governments billions of dollars to provide their ecosystem services.

== Conservation strategies ==
=== Red listing ===
Red Listing is an approach that works with the IUCN's Red List program in which biological, geographical, and population data are acquired from field studies. The data is put into the Red List database and utilized to inform governments and organizations as to how, where, and what is needing the most conservation efforts. This strategy works through the legislative or organization processes in order to turn field data into conservation efforts. Efforts include governmental regulation of the species and its use, habitat protection, and regulation of known threats.

For lichen-forming fungi, Red List assessments are often complicated by incomplete distribution data and the fact that many species are small, difficult to identify, or overlooked in surveys, so recent guidance has recommended using plausible ranges for measures such as area of occupancy and extent of occurrence when exact values cannot be established.

=== Species specific approach ===
Species specific approaches typically target known, at risk species, and utilize geographic data as well as population data to derive conservation strategies. These strategies include reducing human use of the species, regulating land use, reducing invasive predator populations, and improving habitat quality. Geographic data typically includes information such as extent of occurrence and area of occupancy while population data includes information such as life-history strategies, known threats, and reproductive strategies. Species specific approaches may also target an associated keystone species and work to support them. Known keystone species can provide easier methods of implementing conservation efforts and help conserve all associated species. Keystone species have effects known as a trophic cascade in which increasing population of keystone species regulate the population of predators of the target species. This in turn increases population size of the target species. Famously, Wyoming's Yellowstone National Park utilized this approach with wolf reintroduction to regulate elk populations and restore aspen populations.

=== System Approach ===
Systems approaches utilize biodiversity hotspots or establishing reserves for biodiversity and its protection. These system approaches focus on the range of biodiversity and preserving its order to restore system structure and composition. In turn, conservation efforts fixate on maintaining "normal" conditions which include fire, flood, and other disturbance regimes. Community and habitat interactions and dynamics such as nutrient cycling, food webs, and key ecological functions of the target species group are monitored and restored if possible. By establishing and maintaining "normal" conditions, conservationists hope that populations of target species, or target groups, will naturally return to their "normal" population levels.

== See also ==
- Fungi by conservation status
- Global Fungal Red List Initiative
