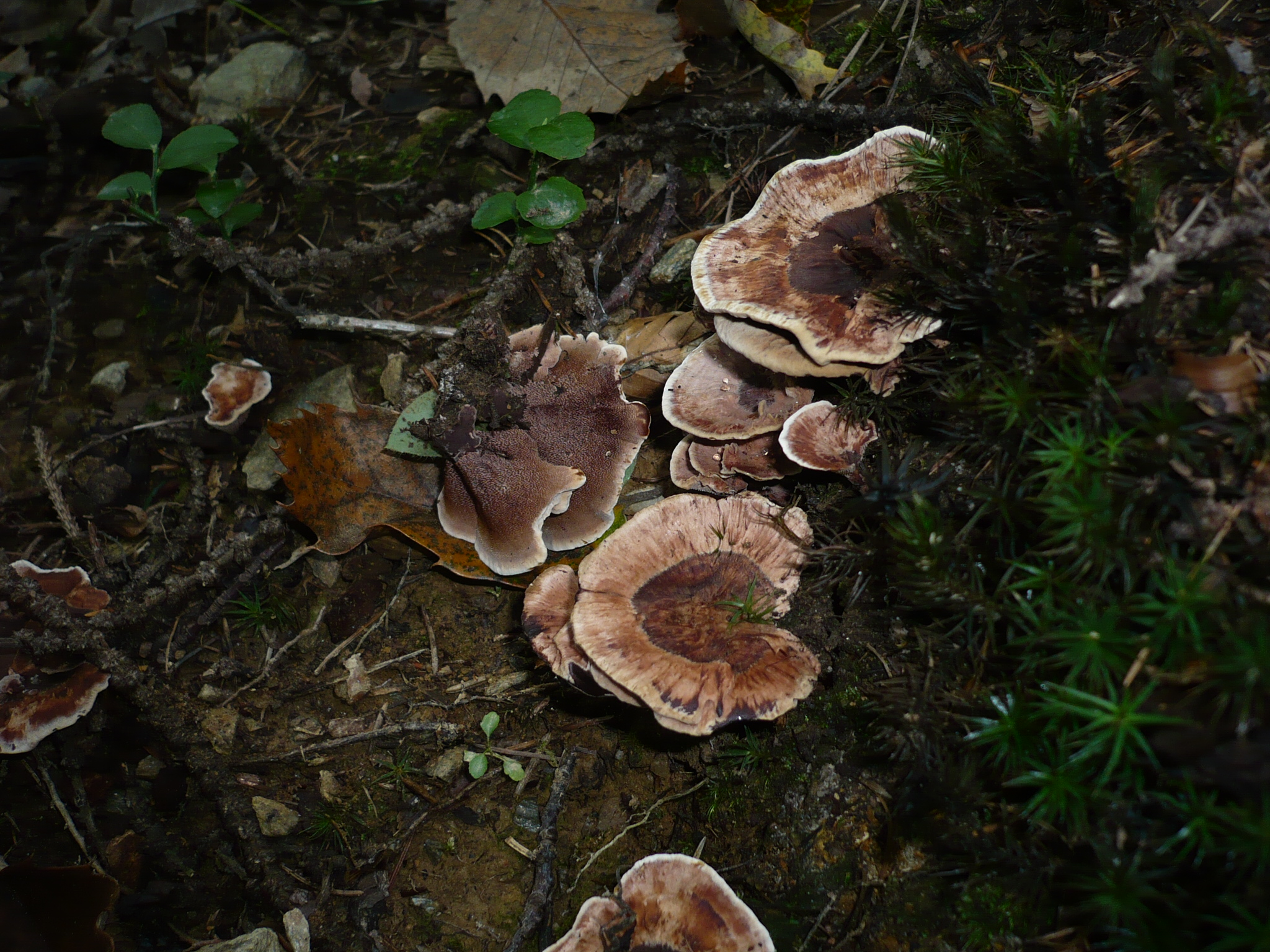

Conservation status
- Vulnerable (IUCN 3.1)

Scientific classification
- Kingdom: Fungi
- Division: Basidiomycota
- Class: Agaricomycetes
- Order: Thelephorales
- Family: Bankeraceae
- Genus: Hydnellum
- Species: H. compactum

Binomial name
- Hydnellum compactum (Pers.) P.Karst. (1879)

Synonyms
- Hydnum compactum Pers. (1800); Hydnum striatum Schaeff. (1774); Hydnum compactum var. striatum (Schaeff.) Pers. (1825); Calodon compactus (Pers.) P.Karst. (1882); Phaeodon compactus (Pers.) J.Schröt. (1888); Hydnum tuberculosum Britzelm. (1894)

= Hydnellum compactum =

Species of fungus

Hydnellum compactum is a rare tooth fungus in the family Bankeraceae. It is characterised by its astringent taste, yellowish flesh. It is found in Europe, where it grows in deciduous forest, typically under beech. Fruit bodies of the fungus grow singly or in groups.

They are top-shaped, with convex or flattened upper surfaces up to 10 cm (4 in) in diameter. The surface texture is initially felt-like before becoming pitted and rough in age. The stipe, roughly the same color as the cap, is solid and measures 2–4 cm (0.8–1.6 in) long by 1–3 cm (0.4–1.2 in) thick. On the fertile cap underside (the hymenium), there are white to purple-brown, curved spines up to 5 mm long. The color is whitish at first but gradually turns dark brown to blackish. The spores measure 5.5–6 by 3.5–4.5 μm, and feature tubercles that sometimes have a sunken tip.

Hydnellum compactum Mycological characteristics
- Teeth on hymenium
- Cap is convex or flat
- Spore print is brown
- Ecology is mycorrhizal
- Edibility is unknown

Hydnellum compactum is ectomycorrhizal with Sessile Oak (Quercus petraea), Common Oak (Q. robur) and Beech (Fagus sylvatica) as well as Sweet Chestnut (Castanea sativa) occasionally. It prefers in nutrient poor, dry to moist, loamy and sandy soils, and sunny, mosaic, old-growth forests.

It is considered endangered is Switzerland, and listed as vulnerable on the IUCN red list. It is estimated there are less than 4000 mature individuals of this species left in Europe. Its presence has particularly decreased in the Netherlands. Its main threats are logging, as old-growth forests are decreasing across northern and central Europe. In western Europe, this fungus is mainly threatened by air pollution, such as acidificiation and nitrogen deposition.

== See also ==
- List of fungi by conservation status
