= Xanthoparmelia beccae =

Conservation status
- Vulnerable (IUCN 3.1)

Scientific classification
- Kingdom: Fungi
- Division: Ascomycota
- Class: Lecanoromycetes
- Order: Lecanorales
- Family: Parmeliaceae
- Genus: Xanthoparmelia
- Species: X. beccae

Binomial name
- Xanthoparmelia beccae Aptroot (2008)

Species of lichen

Xanthoparmelia beccae is a species of saxicolous and terricolous (rock- and soil-dwelling) foliose lichen in the family Parmeliaceae. Endemic to the island of Saint Helena in the South Atlantic Ocean, it has been assessed as a vulnerable species by the International Union for Conservation of Nature (IUCN) due to its small population and threats to its habitat.

== Taxonomy ==
Xanthoparmelia beccae was first described by the Dutch lichenologist André Aptroot in 2008 based on specimens collected during a lichen survey of Saint Helena in 2006. The specific epithet beccae honours Rebecca Cairns-Wicks for her assistance in introducing Aptroot to the plants and vegetation of Saint Helena during his field work.

Aptroot noted that X. beccae superficially resembles Xanthoparmelia eradicata, which occurs in South Africa, but differs in having a denser branching pattern and being isidiate. The coralline growth form of X. beccae is unusual for the genus Xanthoparmelia.

== Description ==
Xanthoparmelia beccae has a foliose thallus that appears fruticose, forming dense, nearly hemispherical tufts up to 3 cm in diameter. The marginal lobes are branched, convex, slightly flattened, and generally about 0.3 mm wide (up to 0.8 mm wide). The upper surface is greenish-grey due to the presence of usnic acid, with blackened lobe tips. The lower surface is dark brown to black, especially towards the tips, with numerous simple black rhizines about 0.2 mm long.

Most of the thallus is covered with a dense layer of richly branched, cylindrical isidia up to 1.5 cm long. The isidia are greenish-grey with blackened tips on the upper side and dull brownish on the lower side. No apothecia or conidia have been observed to occur in this species. The medulla does not react with C or K spot tests, but is PD+ (red). It does not fluoresce under UV light. The lichen contains usnic acid and protocetraric acid.

== Habitat and distribution ==
Xanthoparmelia beccae grows on soil and rocks in dusty areas and boulder fields on Saint Helena. It has been recorded from locations including Rupert's Hill, Bryans Rock, The Barn, and Great Stone Top. In some dusty areas it can be the only lichen species present.

== Conservation ==
Because of its restricted distribution, Xanthoparmelia beccae is subject to accidental extinction by trampling, collecting, road development, and local over-grazing. For these reasons, it has been assessed as a vulnerable species on the global Red List of Threatened Species of the International Union for Conservation of Nature.
