= Boletus chilensis =

Conservation status
- Endangered (IUCN 3.1)

Scientific classification
- Kingdom: Fungi
- Division: Basidiomycota
- Class: Agaricomycetes
- Order: Boletales
- Family: Boletaceae
- Genus: Boletus
- Species: B. chilensis

Binomial name
- Boletus chilensis Singer

Species of fungus

Boletus chilensis
- Mycological characteristics
- Pores on hymenium
- Cap is convex
- Ecology is mycorrhizal

Boletus chilensis is a species of fungus in the family Boletaceae within the order Boletales, native to Chile.

== Taxonomy ==
The species was first described by Rolf Singer in 1967, based on specimens from Valdivia, Chile. A specimen is deposited in Chilean National Museum of Natural History, under the catalog number SGO 092416.

== Ecology ==
Boletus chilensis is ectomycorrhizal, growing on soil under the Patagonian oak (Nothofagus obliqua).
