= Hydnellum cruentum =

Scientific classification
- Domain: Eukaryota
- Kingdom: Fungi
- Division: Basidiomycota
- Class: Agaricomycetes
- Order: Thelephorales
- Family: Bankeraceae
- Genus: Hydnellum
- Species: H. cruentum

Binomial name
- Hydnellum cruentum K.A.Harrison (1961)

Species of fungus

Hydnellum cruentum is a tooth fungus in the family Bankeraceae. Found in Nova Scotia, Canada, it was described as new to science in 1961 by mycologist Kenneth A. Harrison. Fruitbodies grow singly, in groups, or as fused masses under spruce. Individual caps measure 3–10 cm (1.2–3.9 in) in diameter, and have a club- or cushion-like shape. They are initially light brown, but darken somewhat in maturity. Young fruitbodies can exude droplets of red juice. Spines on the cap underside are lilac to dark blue, and up to 4 mm long. The angular spores are angular, with 4 to 6 unusually prominent outgrowths, and measure 4–4.5 by 3.5–4.5 μm. Harrison described the spores as "so irregular that some resemble stout metal jackstones." The flesh is pale gray to pale brown (sometimes with lilac tints), and has a strong "medicinal" odor.
