= Gastroboletus valdivianus =

Conservation status
- Endangered (IUCN 3.1)

Scientific classification
- Kingdom: Fungi
- Division: Basidiomycota
- Class: Agaricomycetes
- Order: Boletales
- Family: Boletaceae
- Genus: Gastroboletus
- Species: G. valdivianus

Binomial name
- Gastroboletus valdivianus E.Horak

Species of fungi

Gastroboletus valdivianus
- Mycological characteristics
- Ecology is mycorrhizal

Gastroboletus valdivianus is a species of fungus in the family Boletaceae within the order Boletales, native to Chile.

== Taxonomy ==
The species was first described by Egon Horak in 1977, based on specimens from Valdivia, Chile. The holotype is deposited in Chilean National Museum of Natural History.

== Ecology ==
Gastroboletus valdivianus is ectomycorrhizal, growing on soil under southern beeches (Nothofagus).
