= Global Fungal Red List Initiative =

Fungal conservation initiative

The Global Fungal Red List Initiative (GFRLI) is an international conservation initiative that supports the preparation of global extinction-risk assessments for fungi for publication in the IUCN Red List of Threatened Species. It was launched in 2013 by fungi-focused specialist groups within the IUCN Species Survival Commission (SSC), working with the IUCN Red List Unit. The initiative combines an online nomination and review platform with workshop-based assessment and formal IUCN review. By 2025, more than 1,300 fungi had been assessed through the global process, and 411 were listed as threatened. Published studies of the initiative's output have documented both the rapid growth in global fungal assessments and continuing taxonomic and geographical gaps in coverage.

== Background ==
Fungi were long under-represented in global conservation assessment, even though they face many of the same pressures as plants and animals, including habitat loss, pollution, over-exploitation, and climate change. The first fungi added to the IUCN Red List were two lichenized species in 2003, and the first non-lichenized fungus followed in 2006. By 2013, only three fungal species were included on the global Red List.

European fungal conservation work had a longer history: a 2010 review reported that 33 European countries had produced fungal Red Lists, official in 20 of them, and a 2011 methodological paper stated that at least 35 countries worldwide had carried out national fungal assessments, yielding nearly 7,000 nationally red-listed macrofungal species. By 2022, about 40 countries were reported to have national fungal Red Lists covering more than 10,000 species, and those lists were often used as starting points for global assessments.

The initiative emerged from this wider movement, together with a 2012 IUCN World Conservation Congress resolution that called for greater attention to fungal conservation and for a substantial increase in fungal assessments for the IUCN Red List. That resolution also noted that the SSC had established five specialist groups to work on fungi during the 2009-2012 quadrennium. A 2015 review in Conservation Biology likewise argued that fungi had remained marginal in mainstream conservation biology despite their ecological importance.

== History ==
The initiative was first outlined publicly in 2013, and its organizers presented it at the Third International Congress on Fungal Conservation in Turkey that year. Its original timetable planned a public nomination website from 1 September 2013 and an initial nomination period running to 1 June 2014. The initial goal was to have at least 300 fungal species assessed by the end of 2015, with broad taxonomic and geographical representation. Early funding came from the Mohamed bin Zayed Species Conservation Fund.

From 2017 onward, the work also received support through the IUCN-Toyota partnership for Red List expansion. An initial pilot workshop was held in Sweden in spring 2014 and produced preliminary assessments of 25 species, but none were completed in time for the 2014 IUCN Red List update. The first workshop to yield published Red List assessments was held in Sweden in February 2015. By 2017, the initiative's platform contained data from nearly 200 users in 54 countries on 419 nominated species. The initiative's 2023 planning page reported 625 published fungal assessments as of December 2022, including 93 lichenized fungi. A March 2025 IUCN press release announced that 482 newly assessed fungi had raised the total on the Red List to more than 1,300 species, of which at least 411 were at risk of extinction. A Field Mycology column published later that year gave the milestone total as 1,318 assessed fungi, including 134 lichenized fungi.

== Organisation ==
The initiative was originally organized by the chairs of five fungi-focused specialist groups within the SSC, working with the IUCN Red List Unit. The original taxon-based groups were the Mushroom, Bracket and Puffball Specialist Group, the Lichen Specialist Group, the Cup-Fungi, Truffles and Allies Specialist Group, the Chytrid, Zygomycete, Downy Mildew & Myxomycete Specialist Group, and the Rusts and Smuts Specialist Group. From the beginning, the project was described as community-based because species could be nominated, commented on, and improved by professional and amateur mycologists through the public platform before formal submission.

== Assessment process ==
A 2014 overview described a five-step workflow: develop a list of species to assess, collect the data needed for assessment, undertake a preliminary assessment and identify data gaps, finalize assessments for submission to IUCN, and disseminate the results for conservation use. The early website was designed as a wiki-like system in which registered users could nominate species, upload evidence, and comment on draft material. The website functioned as the starting point for workshop-based assessment, and later descriptions noted that draft assessments could be viewed and commented on publicly before submission. Workshops were used to draft and review assessments, to provide Red List training, and to build regional assessment capacity. By the end of each workshop, organizers aimed to have a batch of assessments ready for submission to the Red List Unit. Assessors have also relied on methodological papers that adapt IUCN criteria to fungal biology.

A 2011 paper set out practical approaches to concepts such as mature individuals and generation length for fungi; the 2022 synthesis credited it with making all assessment criteria except criterion E applicable to fungal assessments. For lichenized fungi, a 2024 review discussed how concepts such as mature individuals, generation length, and severe fragmentation should be interpreted in lichen assessments, and recommended the use of "functional individuals", such as occupied trees, in some epiphytic species.

== Data sources and infrastructure ==
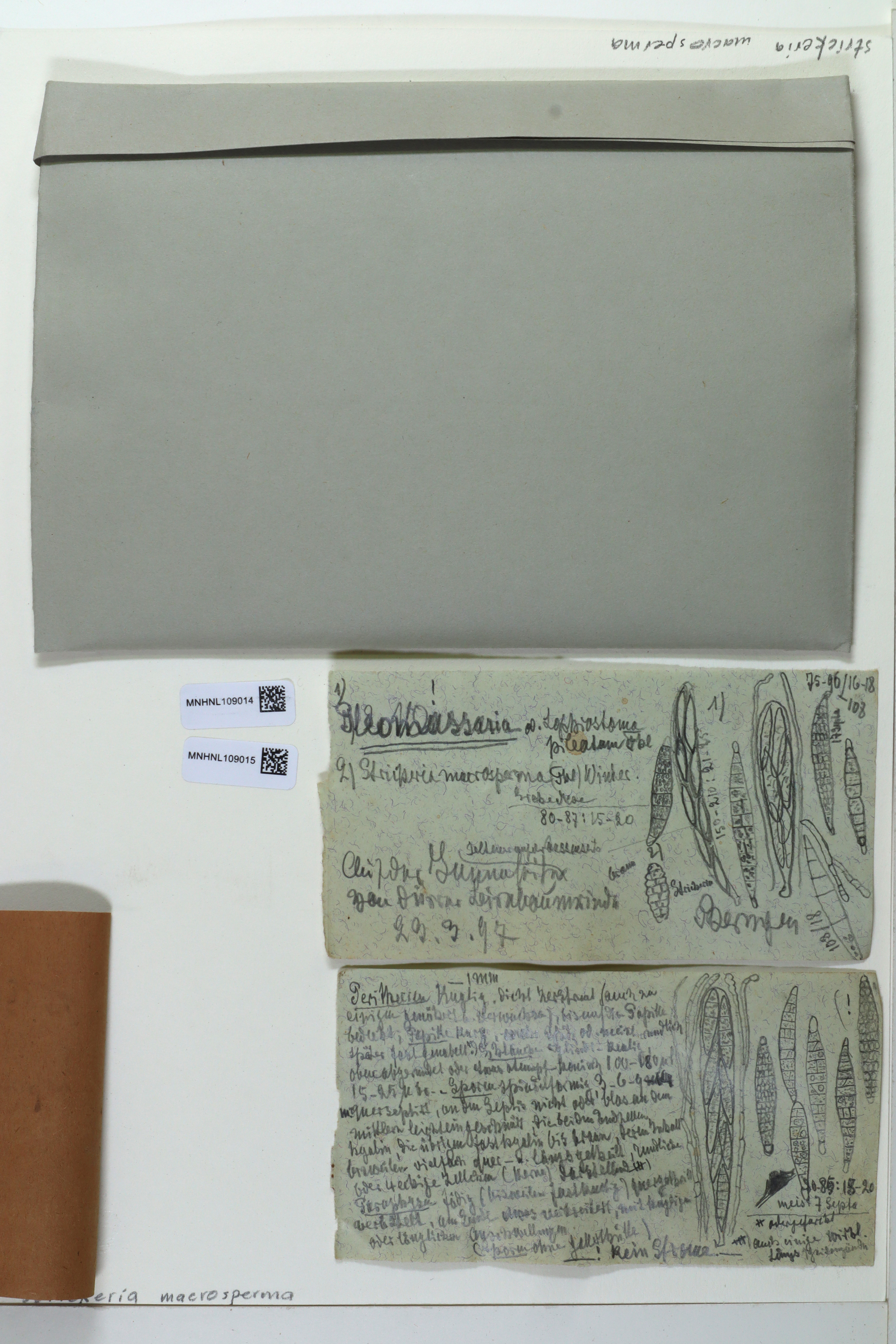
A fungal herbarium specimen originally collected in the 19th century, and now housed at the Luxembourg National Museum of Natural History, illustrates the type of specimen-based records used in fungal conservation assessment.

The initiative depends heavily on occurrence and ecology data assembled from digitized fungarium and herbarium collections, published literature, field observations, and specialist knowledge. Examples of resources used to expand the evidence base for fungal conservation assessments include the Mycological Collections Portal (MyCoPortal), Mushroom Observer, iNaturalist, Fungimap in Australia, and Lost and Found Fungi in the United Kingdom. These developments formed part of a broader expansion in the availability of distributional data for fungal assessment. A 2024 review of lichen red-listing cautioned, however, that large specimen repositories and community science datasets need careful screening because unverified or geographically implausible records can distort assessments.

== Workshops ==
By 2021, the initiative had held 17 workshops in the published assessment series. According to the 2022 synthesis, 13 of those workshops dealt with macrofungi, five with lichenized fungi, and one with rust and smut fungi, while three had global scope and the remainder were regional. The same study noted a strong geographical concentration in Europe and the Americas, reflecting the distribution of both available expertise and data. The workshops also served as a way to train assessors and to move draft assessments through review more quickly than would have been possible through individual work alone.

== Findings ==
A 2022 synthesis analysed 597 fungal species published in the July 2022 IUCN Red List update and treated that set as the first global sample large enough to support a broad review of fungal threat status. Of those 597 species, 345 (58 per cent) were either threatened or Near Threatened, while 284 (48 per cent) fell into the threatened categories of Critically Endangered, Endangered, or Vulnerable. The category totals were 32 Critically Endangered, 101 Endangered, 151 Vulnerable, 61 Near Threatened, 52 Data Deficient, and 200 Least Concern species. All assessed species belonged to Basidiomycota and Ascomycota, and the set was strongly weighted towards forest fungi, ectomycorrhizal species, and taxa from the Nearctic and Palaearctic realms. The most frequently recorded threats were residential and commercial development, agriculture, and logging. For lichens, climate change was the most frequently listed threat, followed by development and human disturbance.

== Impact ==
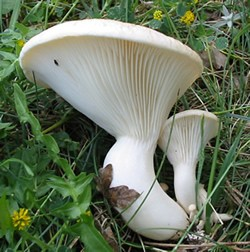
The "white ferula mushroom", species Pleurotus nebrodensis, was most recently assessed for The IUCN Red List of Threatened Species in 2016 as Critically Endangered.

The initiative has been cited in practical conservation guidance as a route by which fungi can be nominated and assessed for global IUCN red-listing. Published fungal assessments have also been used by land managers; one example discussed in the literature is Lepra andersoniae in Shenandoah National Park in the United States, where the Red List assessment informed decisions on permitted activities on sensitive talus slopes.

A 2022 paper in Conservation Letters treated global conservation assessment as one of the tools needed to integrate fungi more fully into international sustainability policy. Reuters' coverage of the March 2025 IUCN update likewise presented the growth in fungal assessments as part of a wider correction to the historical neglect of fungi in conservation practice. A 2024 review argued that the initiative had helped build international collaboration networks and had contributed to a marked increase in fungal and lichen Red List assessments.

== Limitations ==
The initiative's published assessments do not provide a representative sample of fungal diversity as a whole, because species have usually been selected in workshops by experts who suspected that they were of conservation concern and who also had enough data to assess them. The early dataset was therefore biased towards better-known taxa, especially agarics and lichens, and towards better-studied regions. The same study noted that criterion E, the quantitative-analysis criterion, had not been used for any of the threatened fungal assessments in the 2022 dataset. Single-celled fungi, including many chytrid species and yeasts, cannot be assessed under IUCN criteria that were designed for multicellular organisms, placing an entire segment of fungal diversity outside the current framework.

A 2024 review added that uncertainty in population size, distribution, and survey effort remains a major obstacle for many fungi, especially in under-studied and hyperdiverse regions. Reassessment is also a challenge: a 2022 synthesis noted that comprehensive re-assessments had been achieved only for birds, mammals, amphibians, reef-building corals, and cycads, and argued that fungal re-assessments would need a dedicated strategy alongside the publication of new assessments. Many microfungi and other data-poor groups therefore remain difficult to assess even as digital repositories, modelling approaches, and molecular methods expand the evidence available for some taxa.
