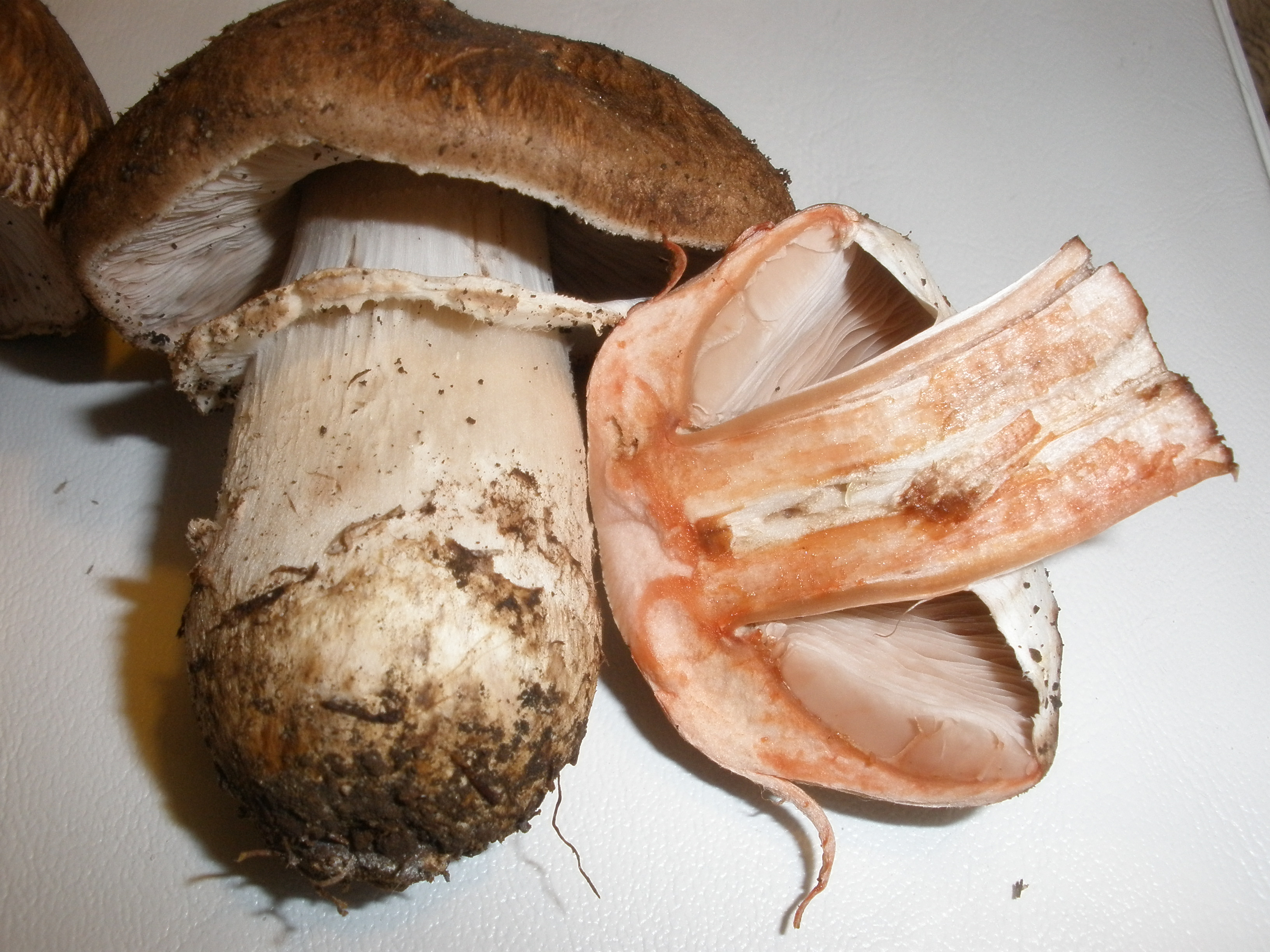

Conservation status
- Vulnerable (IUCN 3.1)

Scientific classification
- Kingdom: Fungi
- Division: Basidiomycota
- Class: Agaricomycetes
- Order: Agaricales
- Family: Agaricaceae
- Genus: Agaricus
- Species: A. pattersoniae

Binomial name
- Agaricus pattersoniae Peck (1907)

= Agaricus pattersoniae =

Species of fungus

Agaricus pattersoniae
- Mycological characteristics
- Gills on hymenium
- Cap is convex or flat
- Hymenium is free
- Stipe has a ring
- Spore print is brown
- Ecology is saprotrophic
- Edibility is edible

Agaricus pattersoniae is a species of fungus. It is found in the United States, where it associates with cypress trees. It has been proposed for inclusion in the IUCN Red List of Threatened Species. It is reportedly edible.

== Taxonomy ==
It was first described in the literature in 1907 by Charles Horton Peck, based on specimens found by A. M. Patterson, a botany student at Stanford University. She found fruit bodies on Stanford campus in January, where they were growing under pine and cypress trees. The specific epithet was originally spelled "Pattersonae" by Peck, although this is now considered an orthographic variant. This species was placed in section Sanguinolenti of genus Agaricus but in the related section Nigrobrunnescentes when this is considered separate.

== Description ==
The cap is 5–19 cm (2–7 1/2 in) in diameter and initially almost hemispherical in shape, transforming to broadly convex and finally to flattened or with edges upturned in age. The cap surface is dry, with fibrils when young, but later the fibrils form large, dark brown appressed squamules (2–9 mm long by 2–5 mm broad). The cap color may be various shades of brown depending on the maturity of the specimen. The cap flesh is typically 1–3 cm (1/2–1 1/4 in) thick, firm, white, and stains deep red 20–30 seconds after injury or bruising. The odor immediately after cutting is mild, faintly spicy, but after several minutes can be described as fruity.

The gills are free in attachment, closely spaced, 5–15 mm (1/4–1/2 in) broad, and marginate. The light-cinnamon color in young specimens turns to a dark blackish brown in age after the spores develop. Bruised gills stain a vinaceous (wine-colored) red.

The stipe is usually 8–18 cm (3 1/4–7 in) long by 2.5–4 cm (1–1 1/2 in) thick with a bulbous shape. The interior is hollow, with the internal cavity being between 5 and 9 mm (1/4 and 3/8 in) thick. The stipe context somewhat fibrous and white in color, except for the basal section which is yellowish. Bruising or cutting results in a red stain after a minute. The surface of the stipe is barely striate above the annulus, and smooth below except for fragments of the universal veil. During development the veils rupture and form an upper veil (partial veil), which initially hangs from the edge of the cap, and a lower veil. As the partial veil disintegrates, it often leaves fragments 2–3 mm in size attached to the margin.

The spores are roughly elliptical in shape, 7–8.5 by 5.5–6.5 μm. The basidia, which may be 1–, 2–, 3–, or 4–spored (although usually 4–spored during active sporulation), are 26–34 by 7–11 μm, cylinder- to club-shaped, with sterigmata that are 2–3 μm long. The cheilocystidia are 12–32 by 6–15 μm in size, almost cylindrical or club-shaped, and may appear clumped or continuous.

== Habitat and distribution ==
Agaricus pattersoniae is associated with Hesperocyparis macrocarpa (Monterey cypress) trees, fruiting singly or in groups. Richard Kerrigan noted that it seems to be restricted to mature trees (age 40+ years) located in the coastal counties of California, although Alexander H. Smith mentions that it has also been found in the Great Lakes regions. The species has been proposed for inclusion in the IUCN Red List of Threatened Species as part of the Global Fungal Red List Initiative. Its main threats include habitat destruction, drought, and decline of cypress trees due to cypress canker from infection by Seiridium cardinale. The cypress trees have been removed from the type locality.

== Uses ==
An edible mushroom, the flavour is described as mild, pleasant, and slightly sweet.

== See also ==
- List of Agaricus species
