= Cortinarius citrino-olivaceus =

Conservation status
- Vulnerable (IUCN 3.1)

Scientific classification
- Kingdom: Fungi
- Division: Basidiomycota
- Class: Agaricomycetes
- Order: Agaricales
- Family: Cortinariaceae
- Genus: Cortinarius
- Species: C. citrino-olivaceus

Binomial name
- Cortinarius citrino-olivaceus Moser

Species of fungus

Cortinarius citrino-olivaceus is a species of fungus native to central Europe.
