= Cortinarius pavelekii =

Conservation status
- Endangered (IUCN 3.1)

- Imperiled (NatureServe)

Scientific classification
- Kingdom: Fungi
- Division: Basidiomycota
- Class: Agaricomycetes
- Order: Agaricales
- Family: Cortinariaceae
- Genus: Cortinarius
- Species: C. pavelekii

Binomial name
- Cortinarius pavelekii (Trappe, Castellano & P.Rawl.) Peintner & M.M.Moser

Species of fungus

Cortinarius pavelekii is a species of fungus native to the Pacific Northwest of North America.
