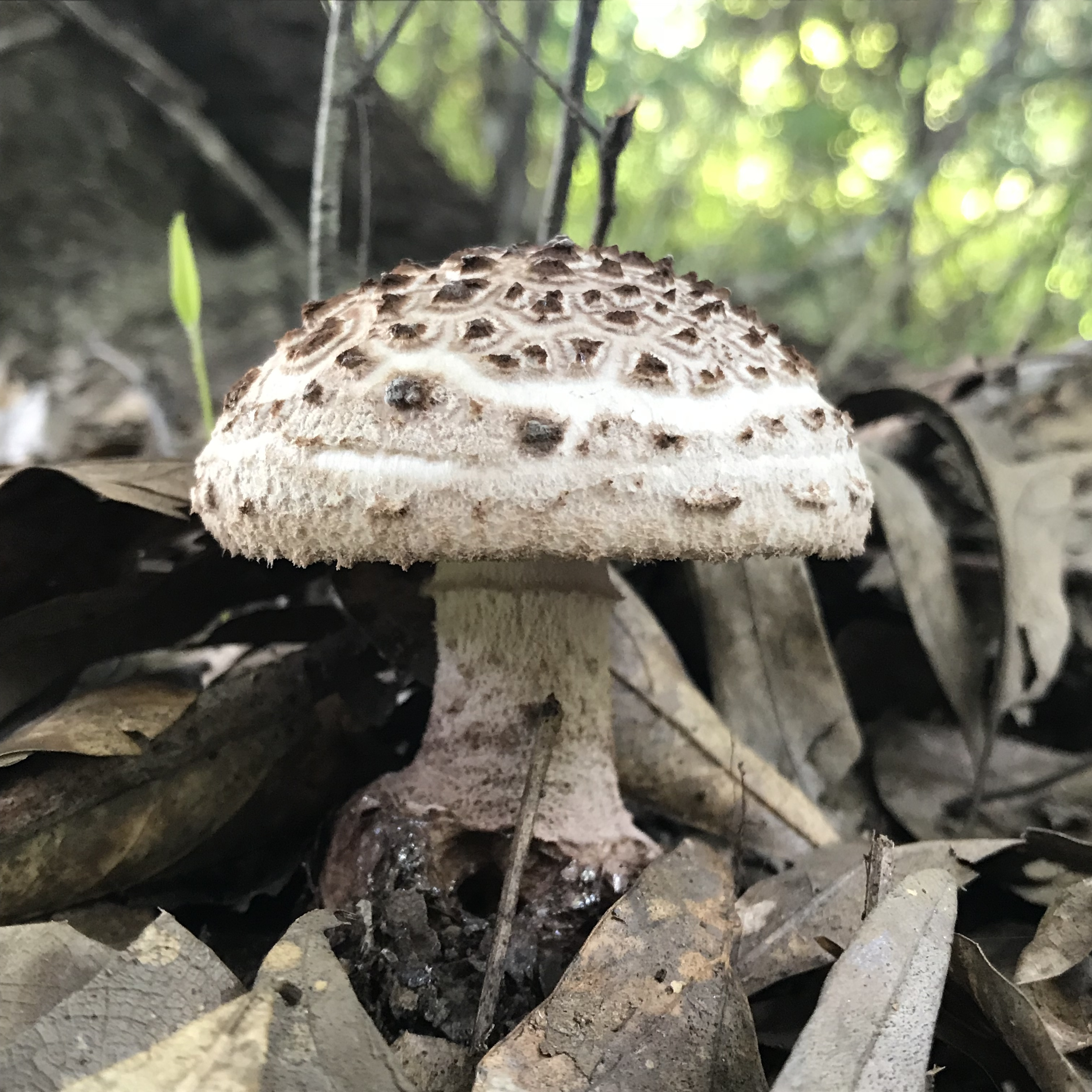

Scientific classification
- Kingdom: Fungi
- Division: Basidiomycota
- Class: Agaricomycetes
- Order: Agaricales
- Family: Amanitaceae
- Genus: Amanita
- Species: A. westii

Binomial name
- Amanita westii (Murrill) Murrill 1945

= Amanita westii =

Species of fungus

Amanita westii is a species of Amanita found in Florida, Mississippi, and Texas, United States
