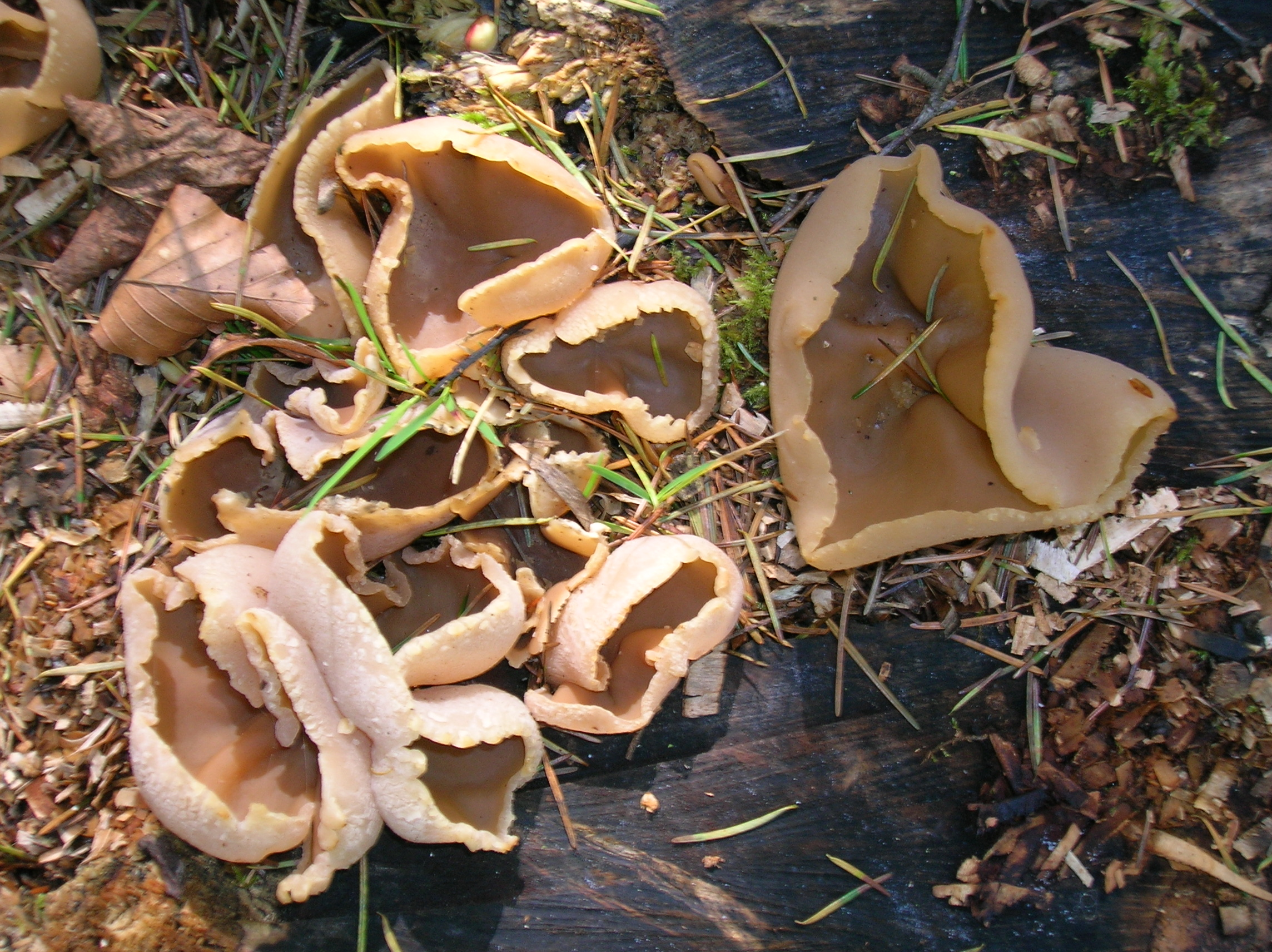

Scientific classification
- Kingdom: Fungi
- Division: Ascomycota
- Class: Pezizomycetes
- Order: Pezizales
- Family: Pezizaceae
- Genus: Peziza
- Species: P. varia

Binomial name
- Peziza varia Hedw. (1789)

Synonyms
- Peziza repanda Pers. (1808); Peziza cerea Bull. (1781); Peziza micropus Pers. (1800)

= Peziza varia =

Species of fungus

Peziza varia
- Mycological characteristics
- Smooth hymenium
- Hymenium attachment is not applicable
- Lacks a stipe
- Spore print is white to cream
- Ecology is saprotrophic
- Edibility is inedible

Peziza varia, commonly known as the spreading brown cup fungus, Palomino cup or recurved cup, is a species of fungus in the genus Peziza, family Pezizaceae.

== Similar species ==
Similar species include Peziza arvernensis, P. domiciliana, P. vesiculosa, and P. violacea.

Peziza repanda, Peziza cerea and Peziza micropus are synonyms.

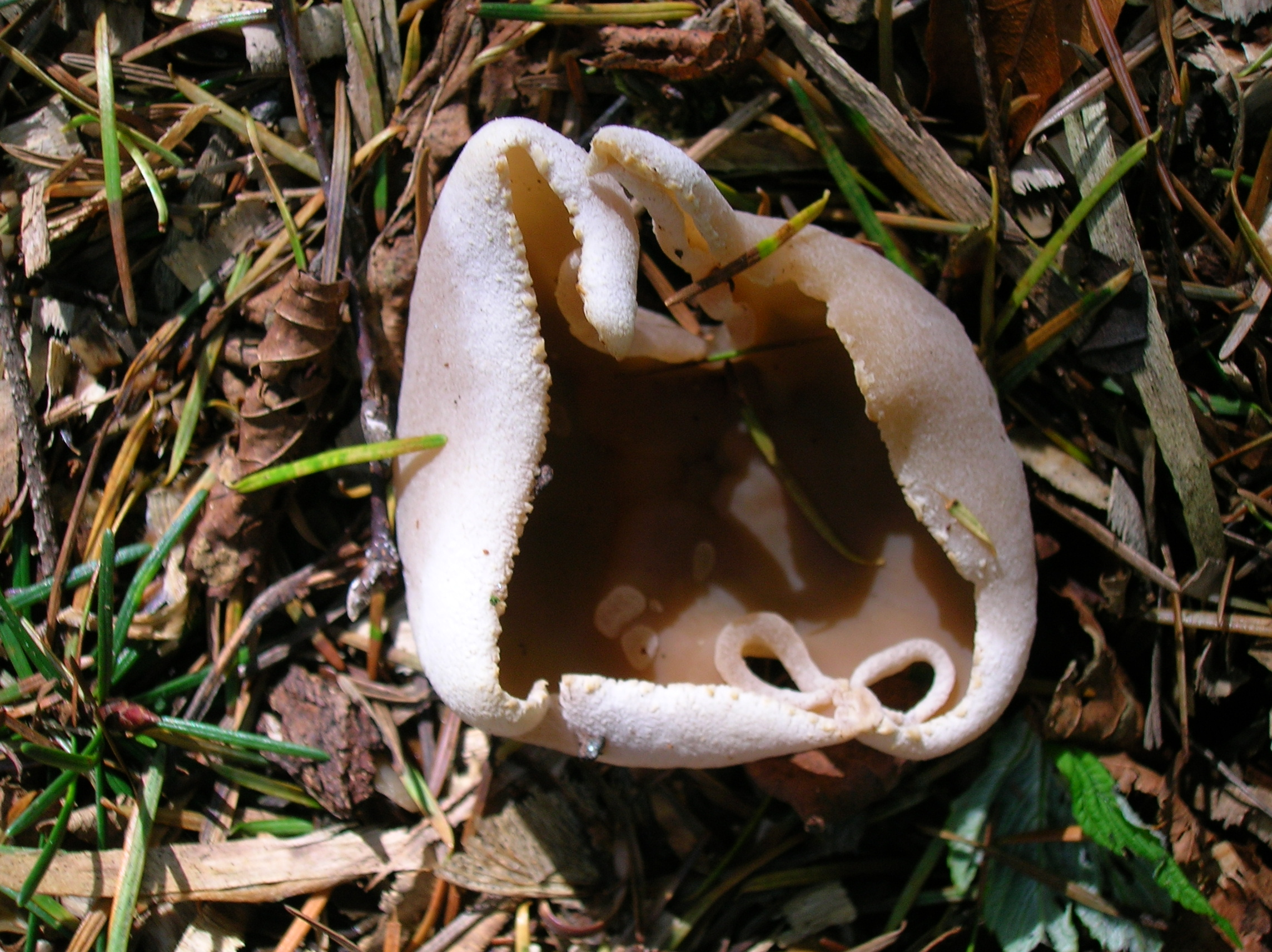
Palamino Cup fungus in Kilmarnock, Ayrshire.

== Edibility ==
Peziza varia is nonpoisonous but inedible.
