= Fairy Cup =

Fairy Cup may refer to:

- The object in Fairy cup legends
- Fungi
  - Humaria hemisphaerica, or "hairy fairy cup", or "brown-haired fairy cup"
  - Bisporella citrina, or "yellow fairy cups"
  - Peziza praetervisa, or "purple fairy cup"
  - Peziza violacea, or "violet fairy cup"
  - Any of the lichenized fungi of the genus Xanthoria

== See also ==
- Elf Cup (disambiguation)
- Faerie cake
- Pixie cup
