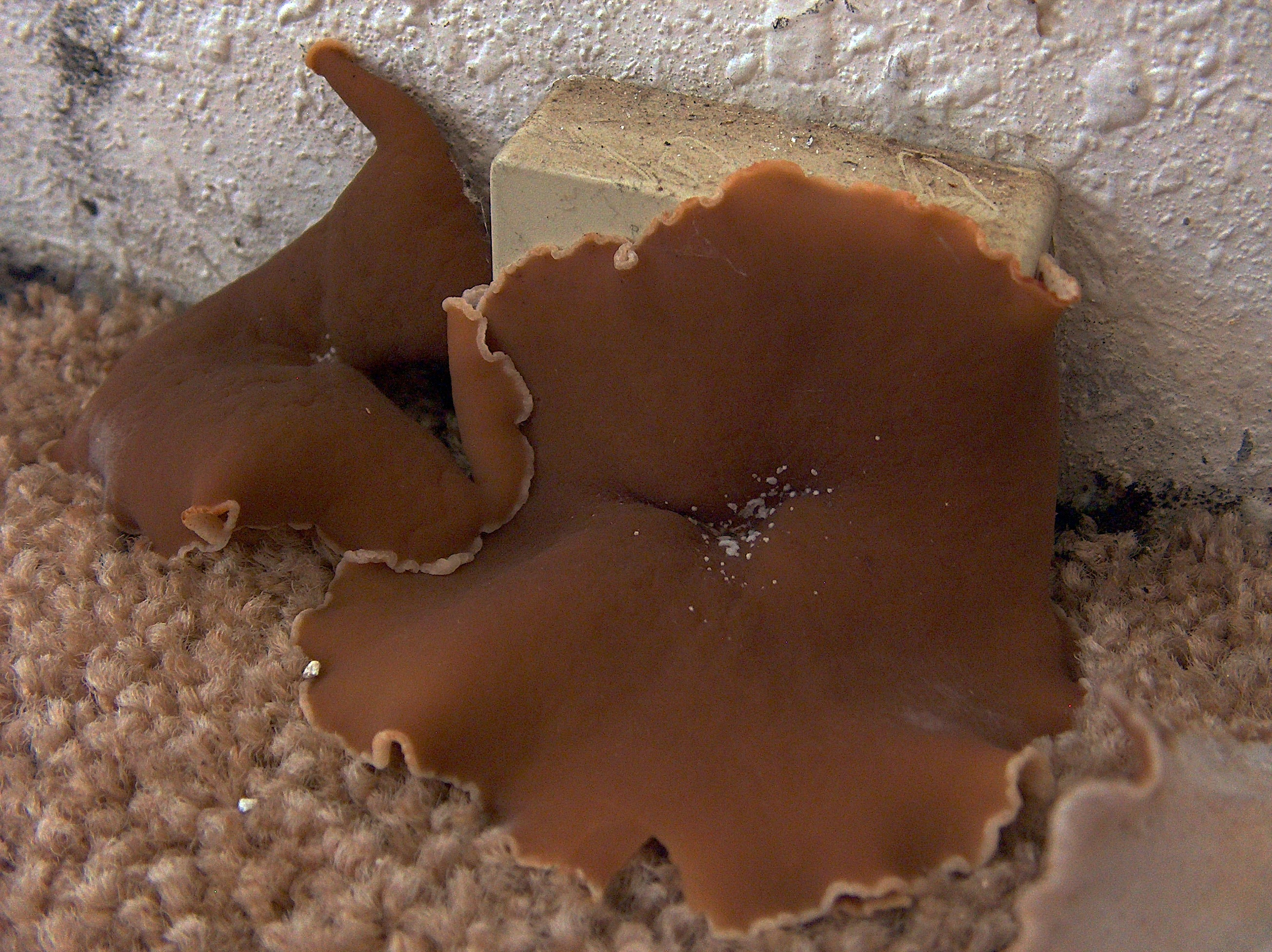

Scientific classification
- Kingdom: Fungi
- Division: Ascomycota
- Class: Pezizomycetes
- Order: Pezizales
- Family: Pezizaceae
- Genus: Peziza
- Species: P. domiciliana

Binomial name
- Peziza domiciliana Cooke (1877)

Synonyms
- Peziza Adae Sadler ex Cooke (1857); Peziza odorata Peck (1896); Peziza varia f. typica Bres. (1898); Aleuria domiciliana (Cooke) McLennan & Halsey (1936); Galactinia domiciliana (Cooke) Gamundí (1960)

= Peziza domiciliana =

Species of fungus

Peziza domiciliana, commonly known as the domicile cup fungus, is a species of fungus in the genus Peziza, family Pezizaceae. Described by English mycologist Mordecai Cubitt Cooke, the fungus grows on rotten wood, drywall/plasterboard, and plaster in homes, damp cellars, and basements. It is known from Eurasia, North America, and Antarctica.

== Taxonomy ==
- - - - - - - Peziza echinispora, P. micropus, P. cerea
            - - Pfistera pyrophila
              - Peziza arvernensis
          - Peziza granulosa, Peziza fimeti
          - Peziza ampliata
        - Peziza nivalis
      - Peziza domiciliana
    - - Peziza ammophila
      - Kimbroprezia campestris

Phylogeny and relationships of P. domiciliana and related species based on ribosomal DNA sequences.

The fungus was first described in 1877 by the British botanist Mordecai Cubitt Cooke, based on specimens sent to him that had been found growing on the walls, ceilings, and floors of a house in Edinburgh that had been partially destroyed by fire. The species was transferred to genus Aleuria by Ethel Irene McLennan & Halsey in 1936, and later into Galactinia by Irma J. Gamundi in 1960; both of the binomials resulting from these generic transfers are synonyms of P. domiciliana.

Peziza domiciliana is commonly known as the "domicile cup fungus".

== Description ==
Peziza domiciliana
- Mycological characteristics
- Smooth hymenium
- Hymenium attachment is irregular or not applicable
- Lacks a stipe
- Ecology is saprotrophic
- Edibility is unknown

The fruit bodies of P. domicilia are cup-shaped; initially concave, they later develop an undulating margin and a depressed center. The outer surface of the cup is whitish, and the margin of the cup can either remain intact, or split. The fruit bodies reach an upper diameter of 10 cm (3.9 in). The inner surface of the cup is the fertile, spore-bearing hymenium; it is initially white before turning buff, tan, or brownish. The whitish stem does not typically become longer than 1 cm (0.4 in).

The asci (the spore-bearing cells) are cylindrical or roughly so, reaching dimensions of 225–250 μm long by 15 μm wide. The spores are ellipsoid, hyaline (translucent) when young, often contain two small oil droplets, and measure 11–15 by 6–10 μm. The paraphyses are slender, contain septa, and are slightly enlarged above. The species is inedible.

=== Similar species ===
Peziza domiciliana is similar in appearance to P. repanda and has often been mistaken for it. Peziza badia is darker brown, grows on the ground or well-decayed wood, and has longer spores measuring 15–19 by 7–10 μm. Other Peziza species have been reported to grow indoors, including P. varia and P. petersii.

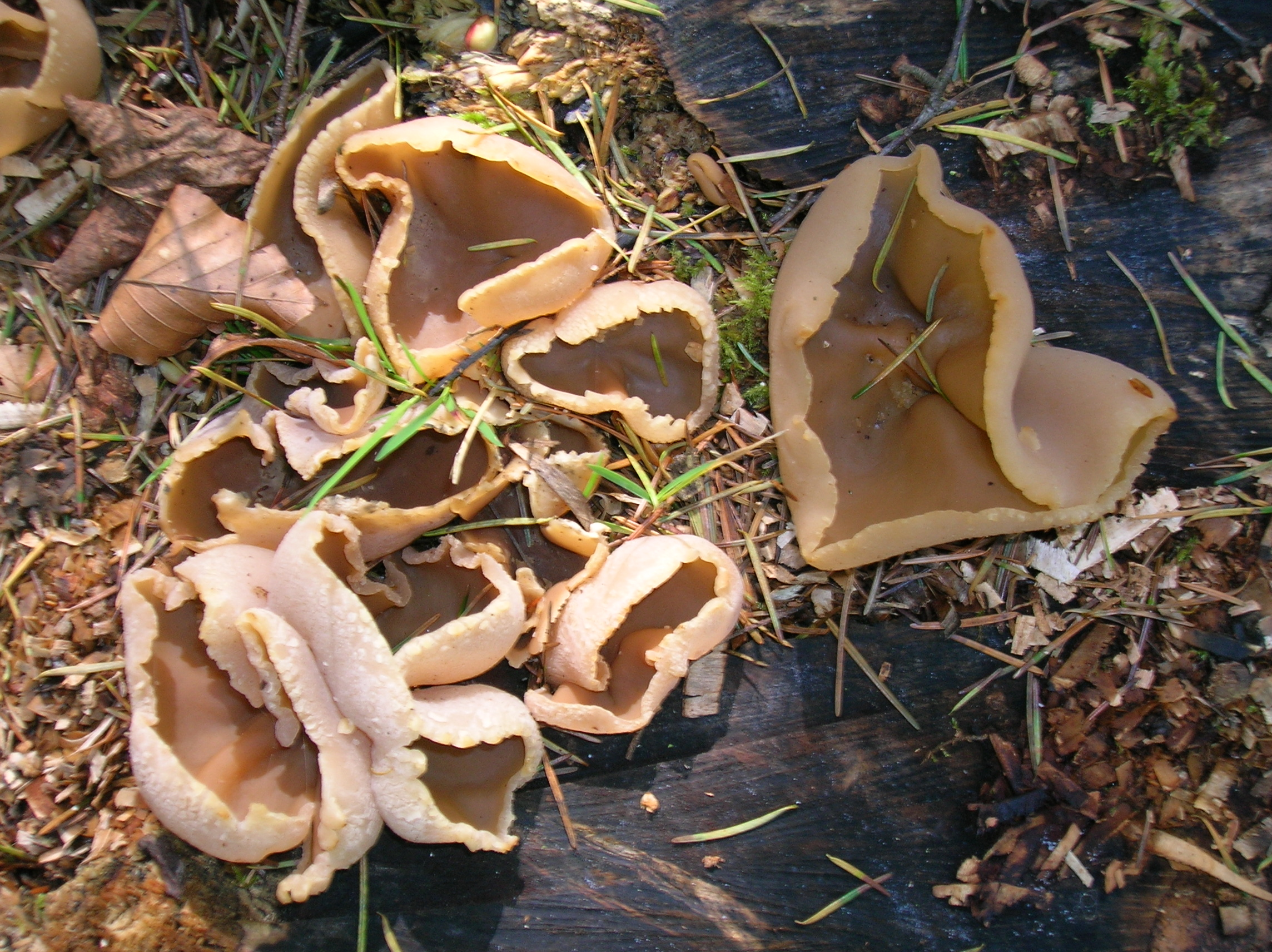
Peziza repanda is a lookalike species.

== Habitat and distribution ==
The fruit bodies of P. domiciliana grow singly, in groups, or in clusters on plaster, sand, gravel and coal-dust in cellars, caves, and greenhouses. The species is known from Europe, North America, and South America (Argentina). The fungus has been identified as one of several responsible for the degradation of construction wood used in historical monuments in Moldavia. It has also been recorded from Deception Island of Antarctica, and from the eastern Himalayas. The fungus has been implicated in a case of hypersensitivity pneumonitis (called El Niño lung in the original report), in which a previously healthy woman developed severe dyspnea and was found to have restrictive lung disease and evidence of alveolitis. A search of her home, which had recently been flooded as a result of heavy rains, revealed the mushroom in her basement, and air sampling confirmed the presence of P. domiciliana spores.
