= Pixie cup =

Pixie cup may refer to:

Fungi

- Geopyxis carbonaria, fungus also known as a "pixie cup"
- Geopyxis vulcanalis, fungus commonly known as the "vulcan pixie cup"
- Scutellinia scutellata, fungus also known as the "eyelash pixie cup"

Lichen

- A number of species of the lichens Cladonia (cup lichen)
  - Cladonia asahinae, lichen commonly known as "pixie cup lichen"

== See also ==
- Elf Cup (disambiguation)
- Fairy Cup (disambiguation)
