= Elf Cup =

Elf Cup may refer to:

Fungi

- Sarcoscypha coccinea, a fungus also known as the "scarlet elf cup"
- Geopyxis carbonaria, a fungus also known as the "charcoal loving elf-cup"
- Helvella leucomelaena, a fungus commonly known as the "white-footed elf cup"

Other

- Elf Cup, a character of Toad Patrol
- ELF Cup, an international football tournament organized by Northern Cyprus Football Federation (KTFF)

== See also ==
- Fairy Cup (disambiguation)
- Pixie cup
