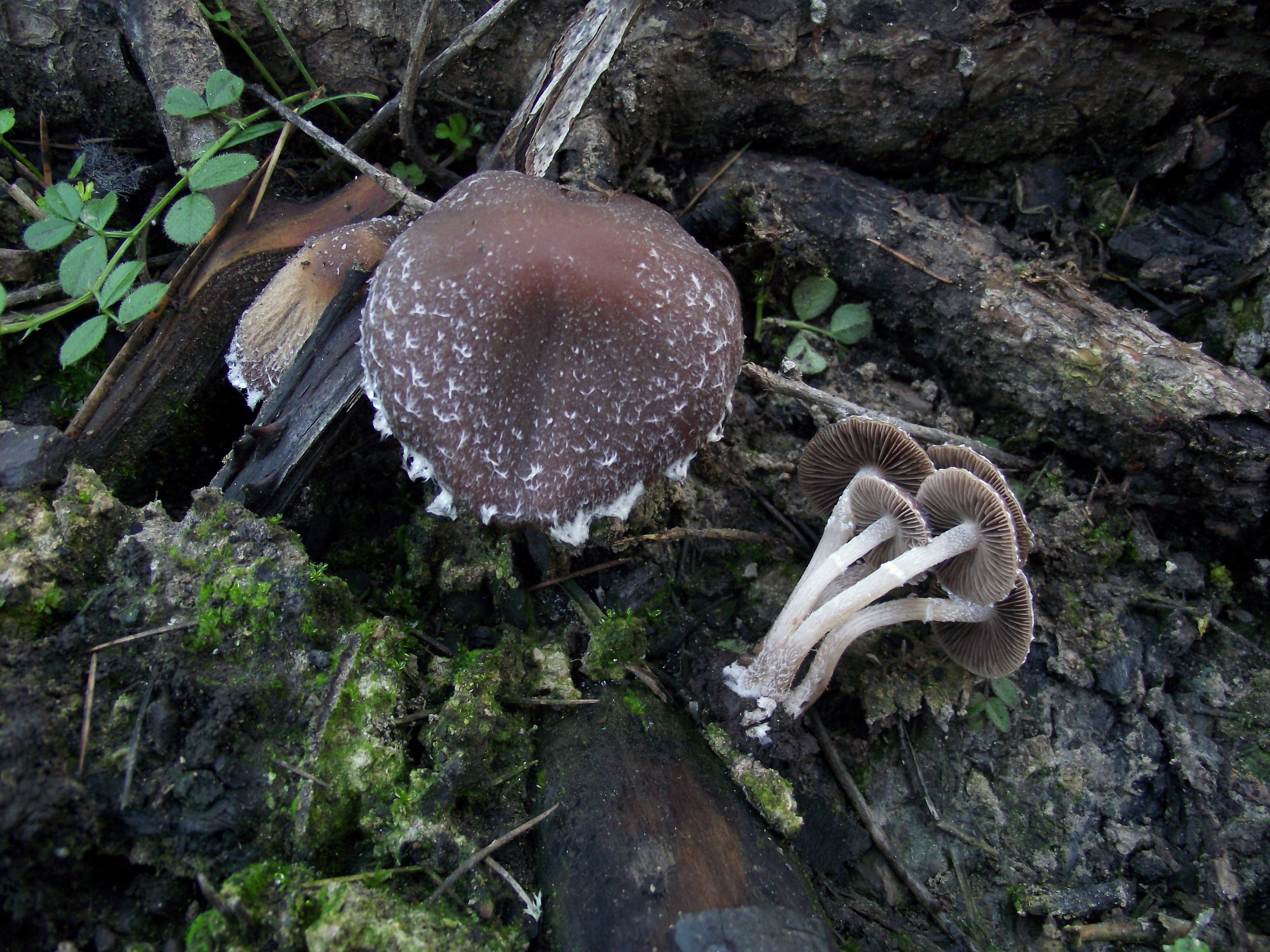

Scientific classification
- Kingdom: Fungi
- Division: Basidiomycota
- Class: Agaricomycetes
- Order: Agaricales
- Family: Psathyrellaceae
- Genus: Psathyrella
- Species: P. pennata

Binomial name
- Psathyrella pennata (Fr.) A. Pearson & Dennis

Synonyms
- Psathyrella carbonicola A.H. Sm.

= Psathyrella pennata =

Psathyrella pennata
- Mycological characteristics
- Gills on hymenium
- Cap is ovate or flat
- Hymenium is adnexed
- Stipe is bare
- Spore print is brown
- Ecology is saprotrophic
- Edibility is unknown

Psathyrella pennata, commonly known as the carbon brittlestem, or bonfire brittlestem, is a species of mushroom in the family Psathyrellaceae. It usually fruits during the spring.

== Description ==
The cap of Psathyrella pennata is brown, and starts out conical or egg-shaped, before expanding outward and becoming convex or flat. It is about 1.5-4 centimeters in diameter. When young, it is fibrillose. The stipe is about 3-7 centimeters long and 0.2-0.5 centimeters wide. It starts out fibrillose, becoming smoother as the mushroom gets older. When young, it has a faint ring zone from the partial veil. The gills are adnexed, and start out light brown, becoming darker with age.

== Habitat and ecology ==
Psathyrella pennata usually fruits during the spring, but it also sometimes does so in fall and winter. It grows in soil in burned areas after forest fires and at firepits. It is often found near Morchella, Crassisporium funariophilum, and Geopyxis carbonaria, as well as other fungi.
