= G. carbonaria =

G. carbonaria may refer to:

- Geochelone carbonaria, the red-footed tortoise, a reptile species native to South America
- Geopyxis carbonaria, the charcoal loving elf-cup, a fungus species

== See also ==
- Carbonaria (disambiguation)
