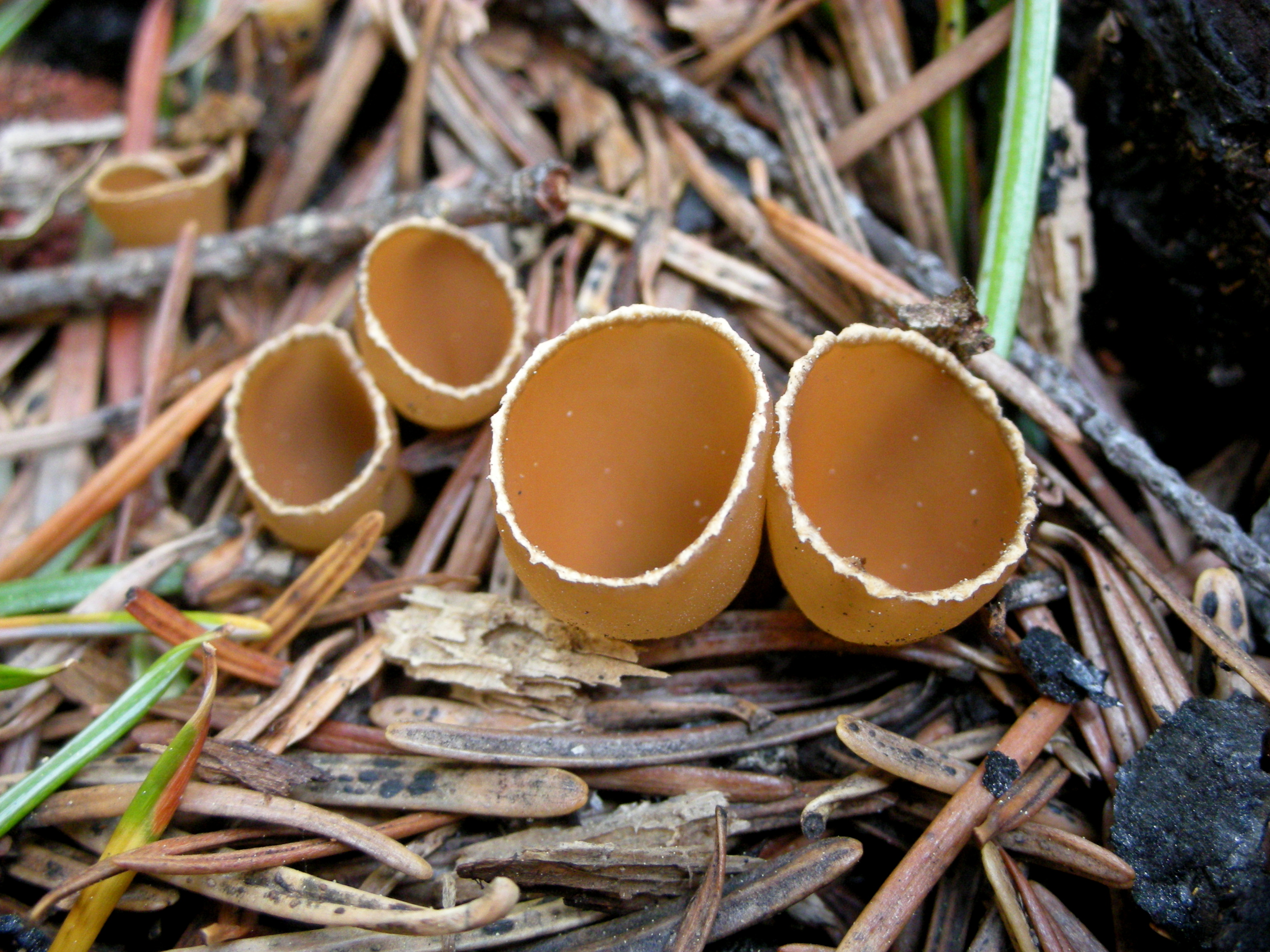

Scientific classification
- Kingdom: Fungi
- Division: Ascomycota
- Class: Pezizomycetes
- Order: Pezizales
- Family: Pyronemataceae
- Genus: Geopyxis
- Species: G. carbonaria

Binomial name
- Geopyxis carbonaria (Alb. & Schwein.) Sacc. (1889)

Synonyms
- Peziza carbonaria Alb. & Schwein. (1805); Pustularia carbonaria (Alb. & Schwein.) Rehm (1884); Geopyxis carbonaria var. sessilis Grélet (1937)

= Geopyxis carbonaria =

Species of fungus

Geopyxis carbonaria is a species of fungus in the genus Geopyxis, family Pyronemataceae. First described to science in 1805, and given its current name in 1889, the species is commonly known as the charcoal loving elf-cup, dwarf acorn cup, stalked bonfire cup, or pixie cup. The small, goblet-shaped fruitbodies of the fungus are reddish-brown with a whitish fringe and measure up to 2 centimetres (3/4 in) across. They have a short, tapered stalk.

The fungus is distributed throughout many temperate regions of the Northern Hemisphere. It is found in Europe, Turkey, and North America. Fruitbodies are commonly found on soil where brush has recently been burned, sometimes in great numbers. Although it is primarily a saprotrophic species, feeding on the decomposing organic matter remaining after a fire, it also forms biotrophic associations with the roots of Norway spruce.

== Taxonomy ==
The fungus was first described scientifically from Europe in 1805 by Johannes Baptista von Albertini and Lewis David de Schweinitz as Peziza carbonaria. Mordecai Cubitt Cooke illustrated the fruitbodies, spores, and asci in his 1879 work Mycographia, seu Icones fungorum. Figures of fungi from all parts of the world. In 1889, Pier Andrea Saccardo transferred the fungus to the genus Geopyxis, giving the species its current name. Pustularia carbonaria, published by Heinrich Rehm in 1884, is a synonym of G. carbonaria. Louis-Joseph Grélet proposed the variety Geopyxis carbonaria var. sessilis in 1937, referring to forms producing fruitbodies without a stalk, but the taxon is not considered to have independent taxonomic significance. In 1860 Miles Berkeley and Moses Ashley Curtis described the species Peziza lepida from collections made in Japan as part of the North Pacific Exploring and Surveying Expedition (1853–1856). This taxon was synonymized with G. carbonaria by Mien Rifai in 1968, a taxonomic opinion corroborated by Donald Pfister about a decade later.

=== Etymology ===
The specific epithet carbonaria derives from the Latin word for "charcoal". Common names given to the fungus include "charcoal loving elf-cup", "dwarf acorn cup", "pixie cup", and the British Mycological Society approved "stalked bonfire cup".

== Description ==
The fruitbodies (ascocarps) of Geopyxis carbonaris are cup shaped, 5–20 millimetres (1/4–3/4 inch) wide, and have fringed whitish margins. The inner spore-bearing surface of the cup, the hymenium, is brick red and smooth, while the exterior surface is a dull yellow, and may be either smooth or have blister-like spots (pustules). The stipe, if present, is whitish, up to 15 mm (5/8 in) long and 2 mm wide, and expands abruptly into the cup. The brownish flesh of the fungus is thin and brittle. It does not have any distinctive taste, but has an unpleasant smell when crushed in water.

=== Microscopic characteristics ===
In mass, the spores are whitish. The spores are elliptical, smooth, hyaline, devoid of oil droplets (eguttulate), and have dimensions of 13–18 by 7–9 μm. They are thin walled and germinate and grow rapidly in vitro in the absence of external stimuli. The asci are 190–225 by 9–10 μm. The paraphyses are slightly club-shaped, unbranched, and have irregular orange-brown granules, with tips up to 5 μm wide, and are not forked or lobed. The hypothecium, the layer of cells below the hymenium, is made of densely packed, small irregular cells.

=== Similar species ===
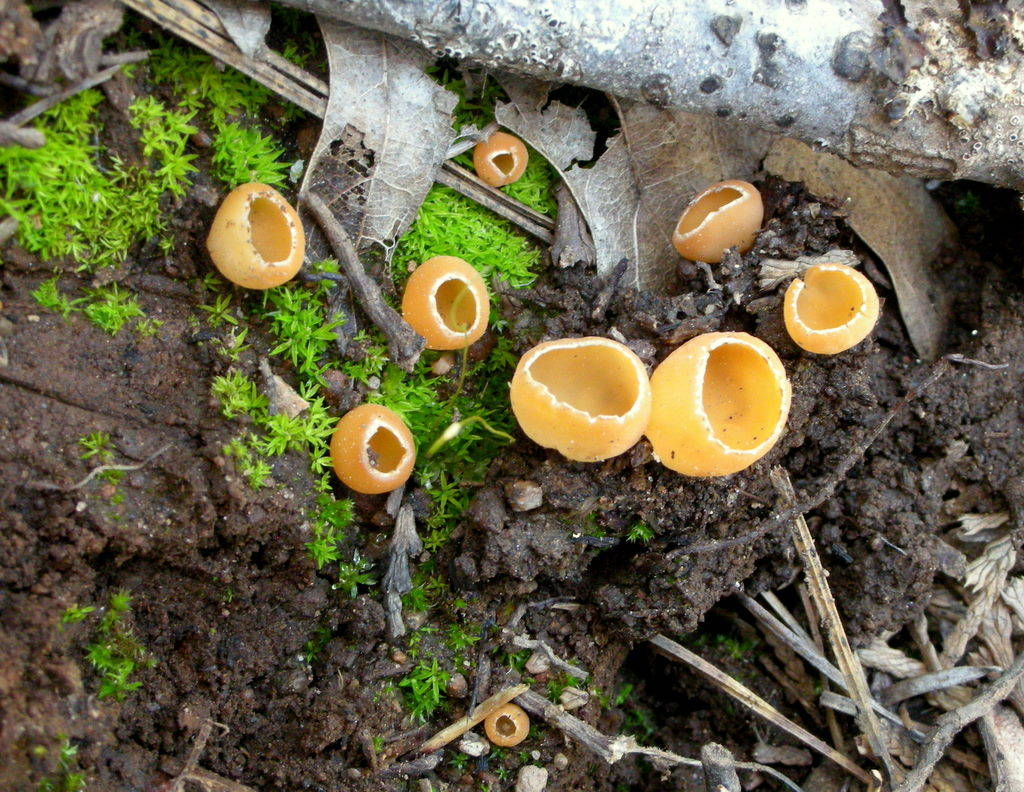
Geopyxis vulcanalis (pictured) has yellower coloration than G. carbonaria.

The closely related vulcan elf cup (Geopyxis vulcanalis) has a pale orange to yellowish fruitbody that is deeply cup shaped before flattening in maturity, and its crushed flesh often has an odor of sulfur. It may be distinguished microscopically by its paraphyses, which lack the orange-brown granules characteristic of G. carbonaria. It also has larger spores, measuring 14–22 by 8–11 μm. Unlike G. carbonaria, it grows on substrates other than burned wood, including mosses, and needle duff. Tarzetta cupularis, which grows habitats similar to G. carbonaria, is distinguished microscopically by its spores that contain two oil droplets. Tarzetta catinus is also similar. Other genera with similar species with which G. carbonaria may be confused include Aleuria, Anthracobia, Caloscypha, Melastiza, Pithya, and Sowerbyella.

== Distribution and habitat ==
G. carbonaria is widespread throughout North America from Alaska south, excluding the Gulf Coast region; it appears from March to June on the West Coast and April to September elsewhere. It is also found in Europe, and in 2010, was reported for the first time from Turkey.

The fungus is widespread on burned soil or charcoal in the spring and throughout the growing season. It is one of the most common pioneer species found on burned ground. The charred litter on the forest floor increases the underlying soil pH as well as the availability of minerals. Fruitbodies are produced from 16 to 139 weeks after a forest fire in areas with coniferous trees. Most fruitbodies are produced in the first year after a burn. The fungus prefers fruiting in microhabitats with thin postfire duff near standing burned tree trunks. Geopyxis carbonaria fruitbodies are often found in the same post-fire stands as morels, although the former is usually more abundant. Because the pixie cup fruits earlier than morels, it may serve as an indicator of imminent morel fruiting. Other cup fungi often found fruiting in the same area as G. carbonaria include those from the genera Aleuria, Anthracobia, Peziza, and Tarzetta.

== Ecology ==
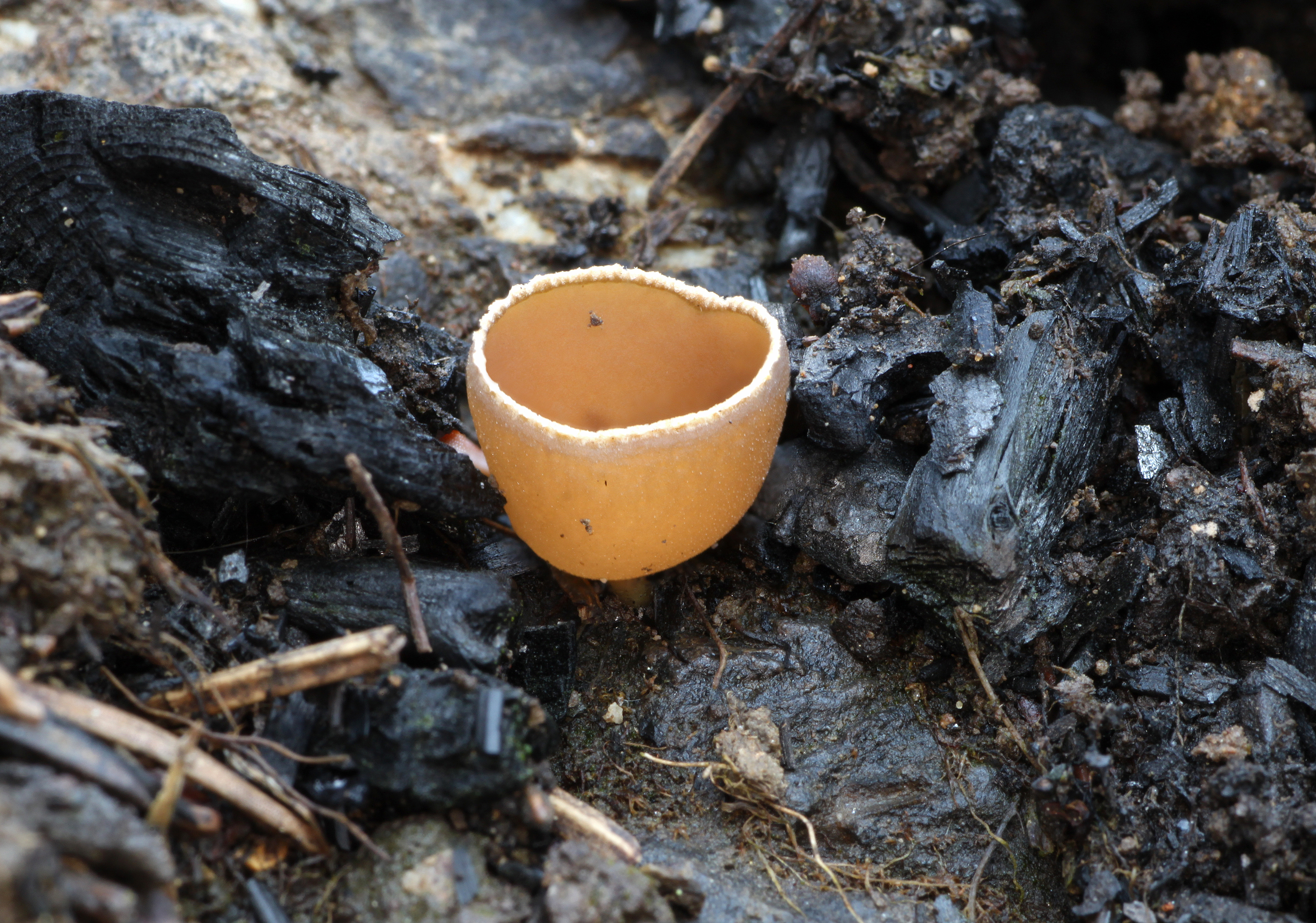
A solitary G. carbonaria fruitbody growing on burnt woody debris

Although primarily a saprotrophic fungus involved in the post-fire breakdown of duff and coniferous roots, Geopyxis carbonaria has been shown to be capable of forming ectomycorrhizae with Norway spruce (Picea abies). It had been demonstrated earlier in laboratory experiments that the fungus has a biotrophic interaction with lodgepole pine (Pinus contorta). The hyphae of G. carbonaria were able to infect the cortex of the tree seedling, but did not penetrate the endodermis. These traits suggest that the fungus is a moderate pathogen, with limited ability to cause reductions in seed germination. Additionally, the fungus produces the enzyme polyphenol oxidase, and can break down the complex organic polymer lignin—features characteristic of saprotrophic fungi. The formation of a rudimentary Hartig net, a characteristic of mycorrhizal fungi, indicated that G. carbonaria might be capable of forming mutualistic relationships under the right conditions. Vrålstad and colleagues suggest that its below-ground association with spruce roots protects it from physical damage in the event of a fire, and the extensive fruitbody production after a fire may reflect "a successful fungal escape from a dying host where the fungus no longer can maintain its biotrophic association".

Large fruitings of the fungus are often associated with damage to the host tree, such as that which occurs with burning. A field study conducted in Norway demonstrated that fruit bodies were more likely to be found in areas that were heavily burned, compared to locations with light to moderate burning where the trees remained viable, or in clearcut areas. Fruiting was much denser in spruce forests—with up to 700–1000 fruitbodies per square meter—than in pine forests, where fruitbodies were sporadic. Fruitbodies grew by the millions in the year following the Yellowstone fires of 1988.

== Toxicity ==
It is inedible, with the fruitbodies being insubstantial anyway.
