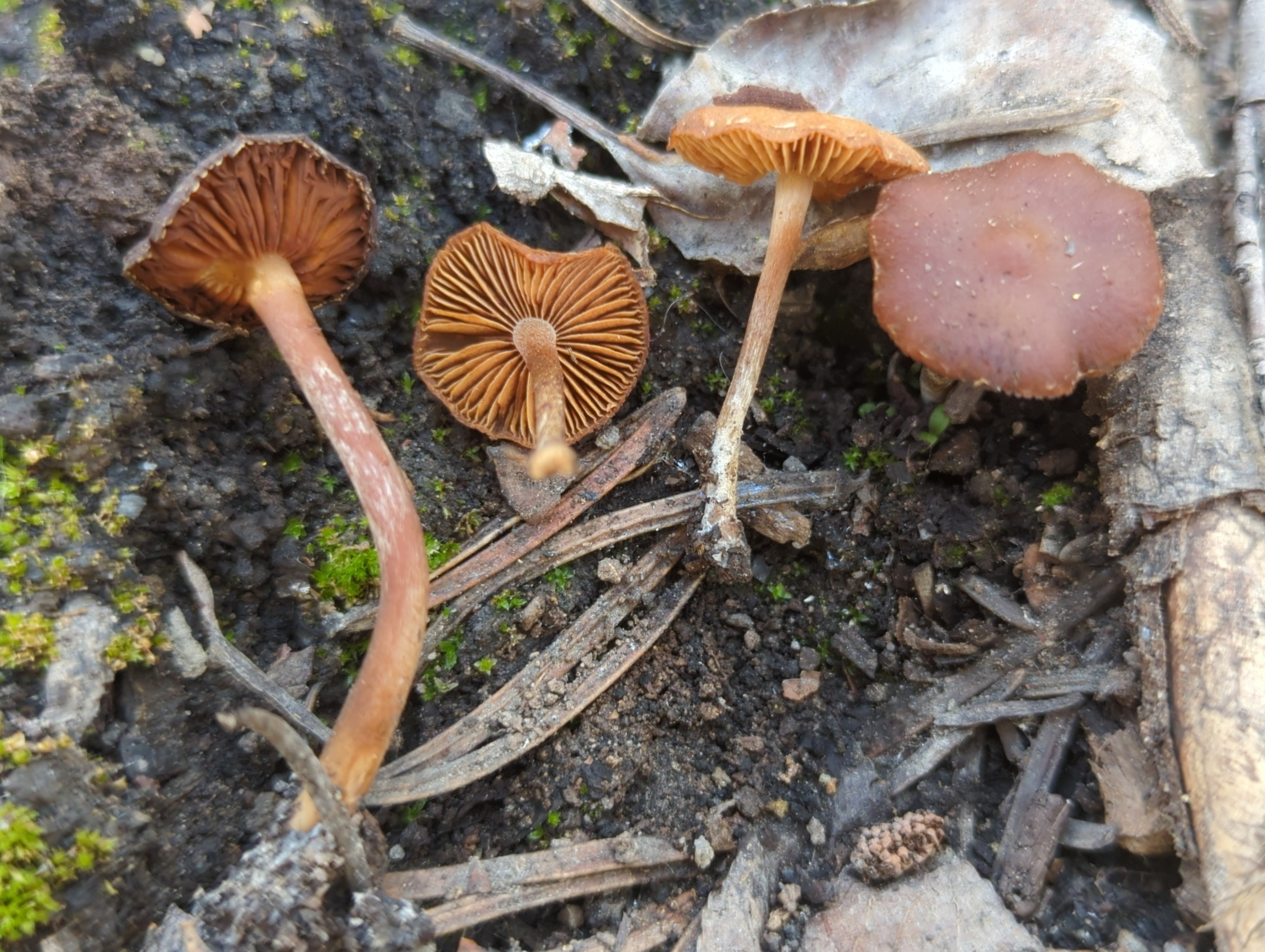

Scientific classification
- Kingdom: Fungi
- Division: Basidiomycota
- Class: Agaricomycetes
- Order: Agaricales
- Family: Crassisporiaceae
- Genus: Crassisporium
- Species: C. funariophilum

Binomial name
- Crassisporium funariophilum (M.M. Moser) Matheny, P.-A. Moreau & Vizzini

Synonyms
- Pachylepyrium carbonicola (A.H. Sm.) Singer

= Crassisporium funariophilum =

Species of mushroom

Crassisporium funariophilum is a species of mushroom in the family Crassisporiaceae. It grows during spring after forest fires.

== Description ==
The cap of Crassisporium funariophilum is 1-3 centimeters in diameter and convex or flat. Sometimes, it is broadly umbonate. It is reddish-brown or ochre. The stipe is about 2-5 centimeters long and 2-4 millimeters wide. On the stipe is a cortina that later becomes a ring zone on the stipe. The gills can be seceding, adnate, or sinuate, and start out yellowish brown, before becoming orangish as the mushroom matures. The spore print is reddish brown.

== Habitat and ecology ==
Crassisporium funariophilum fruits in spring after the snow melts. It grows on burnt soil after fires. It often fruits near Pholiota molesta, as well as Pholiota carbonaria and Psathyrella pennata.

Crassisporium funariophilum
- Mycological characteristics
- Gills on hymenium
- Cap is convex or flat
- Hymenium is adnexed or seceding
- Stipe has a cortina
- Spore print is reddish-brown
- Edibility is unknown
