= Romagnesiella =

Scientific classification
- Kingdom: Fungi
- Division: Basidiomycota
- Class: Agaricomycetes
- Order: Agaricales
- Family: Crassisporiaceae
- Genus: Romagnesiella; Contu, P.-A. Moreau, Vizzini & A. de Haan (2014)

Type species
- Romagnesiella clavus (Romagn.) Contu, P.-A. Moreau, Vizzini & A. de Haan (2014)

Synonyms
- Galerina clavus Romagn.(1944)

Genus of fungi

Romagnesiella is an agaric fungal genus that colonizes mineral, calcareous or sandy soils in Europe and North Africa. The small brownish fruitbodies have narrowly attached, broad and distant lamellae and poorly differentiated cheilocystidia and pleurocystidia. Spores are thick-walled, brown, smooth, and lack germ pore. The cap surface (pileipellis) is somewhat cellular with irregular puzzle-like to pyriform hyphae. Clamp connections are present in the hyphae. It is most closely related to Crassisporium, both genera being close to the Strophariaceae or the Cortinariaceae.

== Etymology ==
The generic name Romagnesiella honours the French mycologist, Henri Romagnesi.

== See also ==
- List of Agaricales genera
