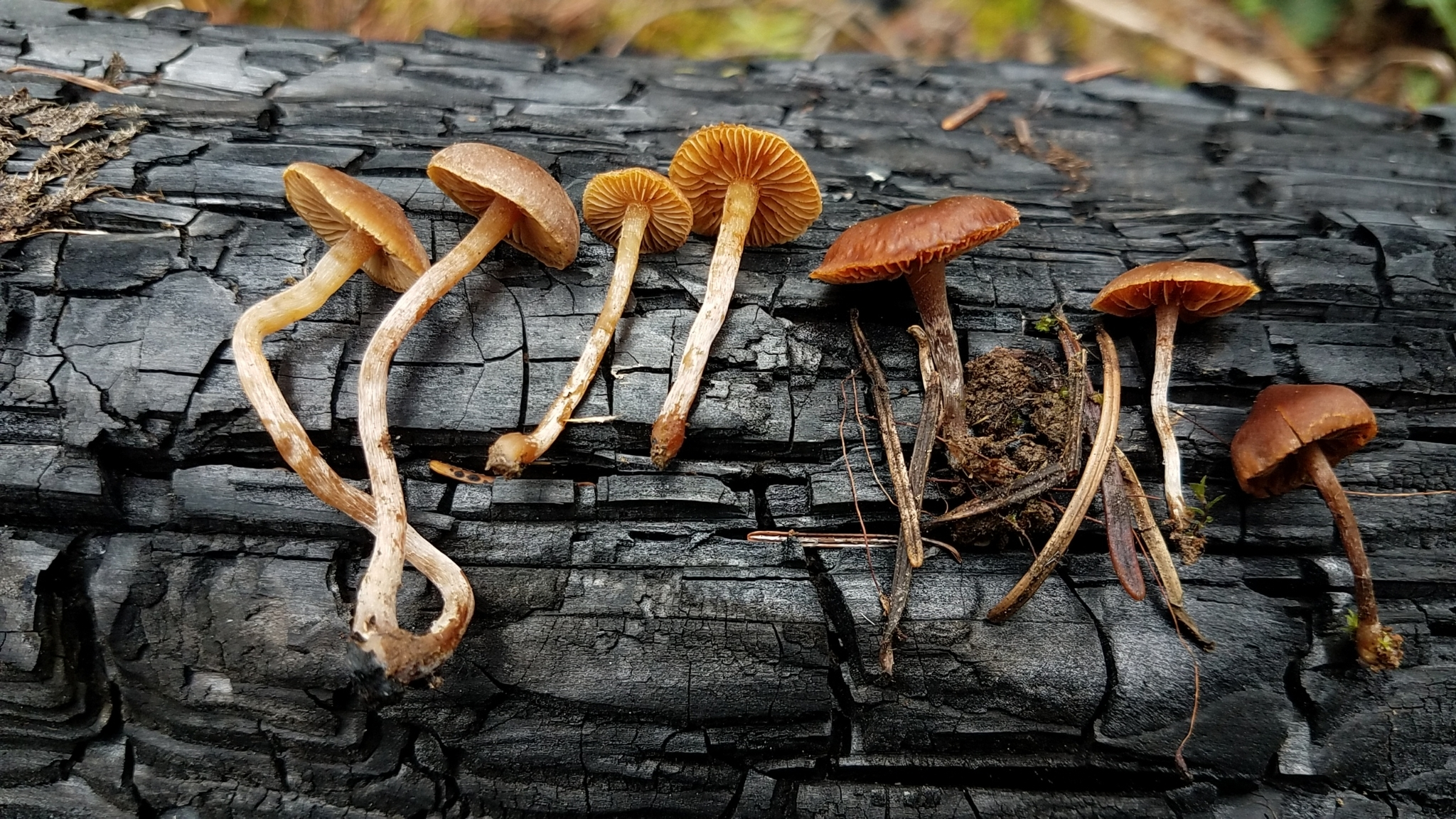
- Crassisporium funariophilum

Scientific classification
- Kingdom: Fungi
- Division: Basidiomycota
- Class: Agaricomycetes
- Order: Agaricales
- Family: Crassisporiaceae; Vizzini, Consiglio & M. Marchetti (2019)

Type genus
- Crassisporium Matheny, P.-A.Moreau & Vizzini (2015)

Genera
- Crassisporium Matheny, P.-A. Moreau & Vizzini (2015); Romagnesiella Contu, Matheny, P.-A. Moreau, Vizzini & A. de Haan (2015)

= Crassisporiaceae =

Family of mushrooms

The Crassisporiaceae is a mushroom family of small brown, naucoroid, brown-spored agarics with thick to slightly thickened, smooth, basidiospore walls that darken to reddish brown in potassium hydroxide (KOH) solution, absence of chrysocystidia, presence of cheilocystidia, nongelatinized tissues in the lamellae, and a filamentous pileus cutis. The family is recognized based upon phylogenetic analyses using DNA sequences and depending upon the analyses varies in relationship to either the Cortinariaceae or, as described in greater detail prior to recognition as a separate family, near the Strophariaceae. Crassisporium is pyrophilous and Romagnesiella may be bryophilous.
