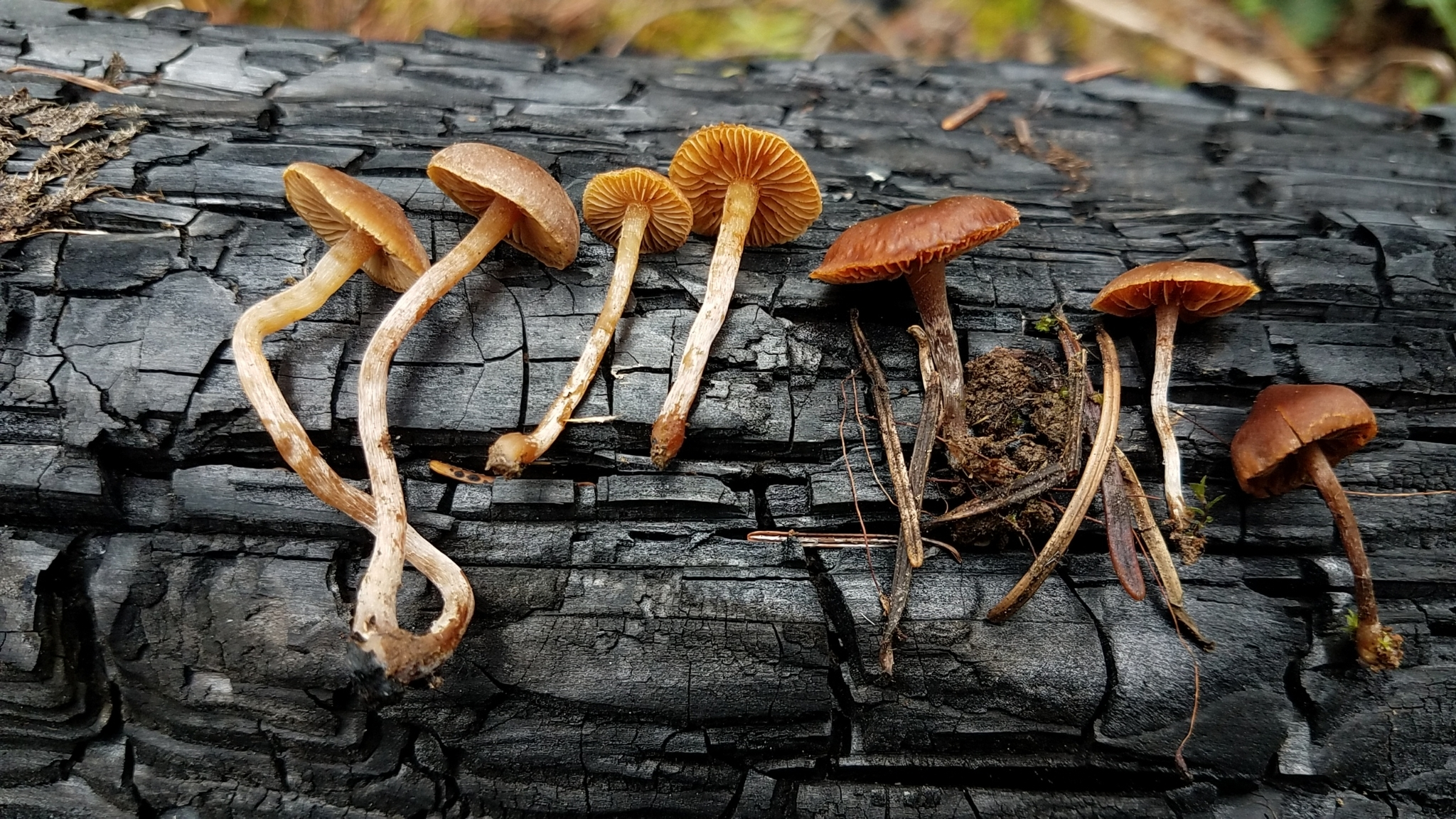
- Crassisporium funariophilum

Scientific classification
- Kingdom: Fungi
- Division: Basidiomycota
- Class: Agaricomycetes
- Order: Agaricales
- Family: Crassisporiaceae
- Genus: Crassisporium; Matheny, P.-A.Moreau & Vizzini (2014)

Type species
- Crassisporium funariophilum (M.M.Moser) Matheny, P.-A.Moreau & Vizzini (2014)

Species
- Crassisporium chilensee Crassisporium funariophilum Crassisporium squarrulosum

Synonyms
- Pholiotina funariophila M.M.Moser (1954); Kuehneromyces carbonicola A.H.Sm. (1957); Pholiota subangularis A.H.Sm. & Hesler (1968)

= Crassisporium =

Genus of fungi

Crassisporium is a burn-inhabiting agaric fungal genus that colonizes forest fire and campfire sites on ground and charred woody debris in Europe, north Africa and western North America. The small brownish fruitbodies have broadly attached lamellae bordered by cheilocystidia and there is an absence of pleurocystidia and chrysocystidia. Spores are thick-walled, brown, smooth, and have a germ pore. The cap surface (pileipellis) is neither gelatinized nor cellular. Clamp connections are present in the hyphae. The genus is most closely related to the genus Romagnesiella and together both are nearest the Strophariaceae or Cortinariaceae. The generic name Crassisporium refers to the thick spore walls.

== See also ==
- List of Agaricales genera
