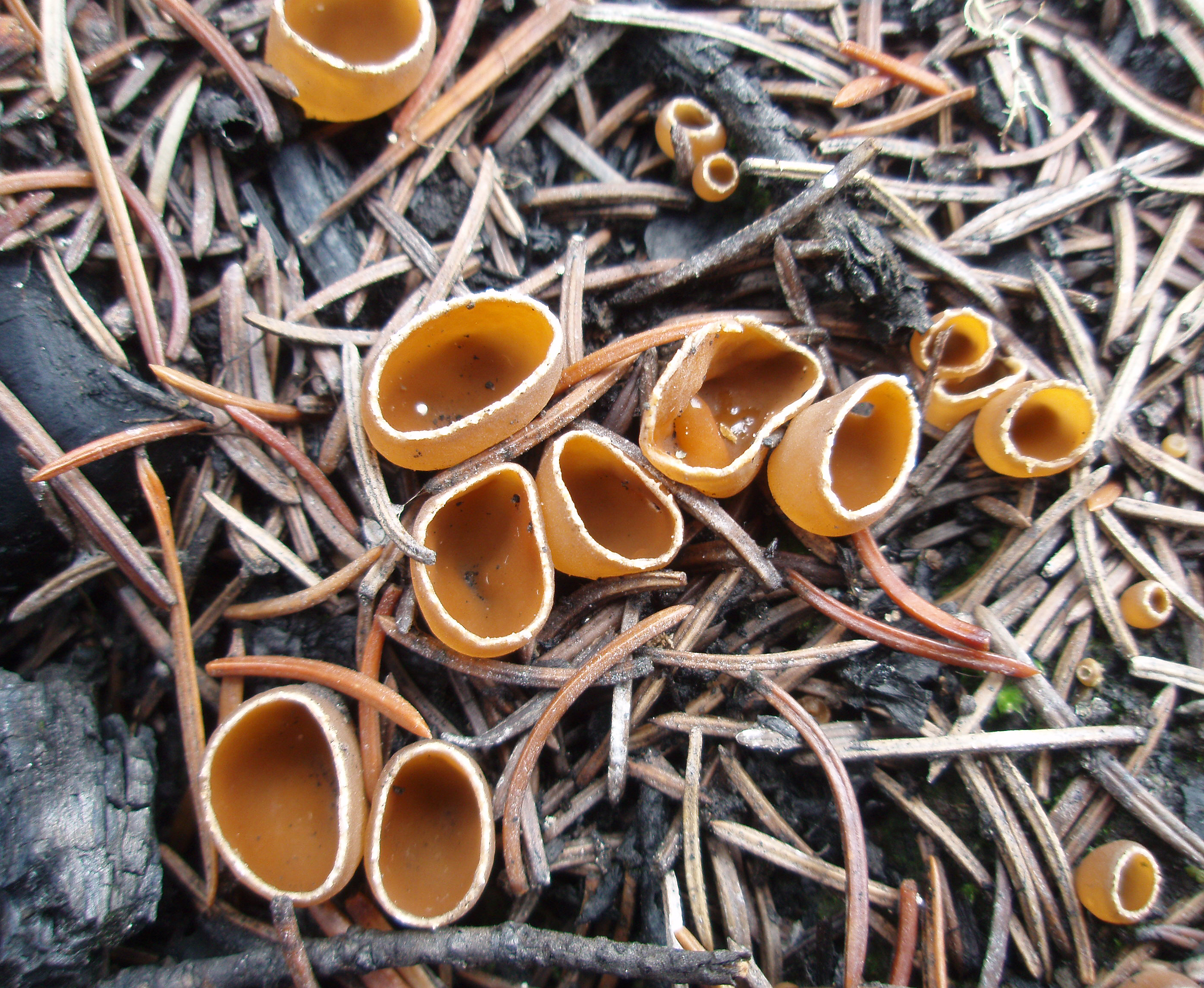
- Geopyxis carbonaria

Scientific classification
- Domain: Eukaryota
- Kingdom: Fungi
- Division: Ascomycota
- Class: Pezizomycetes
- Order: Pezizales
- Family: Pyronemataceae
- Genus: Geopyxis (Pers.) Sacc. (1889)

Type species
- Geopyxis carbonaria (Alb. & Schwein.) Sacc. (1889)

Species
- see text

Synonyms
- Peziza sect. Geopyxis Pers. (1822)

= Geopyxis =

Genus of fungi

Geopyxis is a genus of fungi in the family Pyronemataceae. The genus has a widespread distribution. Molecular phylogenetic studies published in 2007 suggest that the genus is not monophyletic.

== Species ==
As of August 2015, Index Fungorum lists 26 valid species (+1 discovered in 2016) of Geopyxis:

- Geopyxis acetabularioides
- Geopyxis alba
- Geopyxis albocinerea
- Geopyxis alpina
- Geopyxis bambusicola
- Geopyxis carbonaria
- Geopyxis carnea
- Geopyxis cavinae
- Geopyxis delectans (Starback) K.Hansen & X.H.Wang, 2016
- Geopyxis diluta
- Geopyxis expallens
- Geopyxis flavidula
- Geopyxis foetida
- Geopyxis granulosa
- Geopyxis grossegranulosa
- Geopyxis korfii
- Geopyxis majalis
- Geopyxis moelleriana
- Geopyxis nebulosoides
- Geopyxis patellaris
- Geopyxis pellucida
- Geopyxis pulchra
- Geopyxis pusilla
- Geopyxis radicans
- Geopyxis rapuloides
- Geopyxis rehmii
- Geopyxis striatospora
- Geopyxis vulcanalis
