= Geopyxis korfii =

Scientific classification
- Domain: Eukaryota
- Kingdom: Fungi
- Division: Ascomycota
- Class: Pezizomycetes
- Order: Pezizales
- Family: Pyronemataceae
- Genus: Geopyxis
- Species: G. korfii

Binomial name
- Geopyxis korfii W.Y.Zhuang (2006)

Species of fungus

Geopyxis korfii is a species of cup fungus in the family Pyronemataceae. Found in Qinghai, China, it was described as new to science in 2006 by Wen-Ying Zhang. It is the only species of Geopyxis with ornamented ascospores.
