= Pholiota molesta =

Scientific classification
- Kingdom: Fungi
- Division: Basidiomycota
- Class: Agaricomycetes
- Order: Agaricales
- Family: Strophariaceae
- Genus: Pholiota
- Species: P. molesta

Binomial name
- Pholiota molesta A.H. Sm. & Hesler

Pholiota molesta Mycological characteristics
- Gills on hymenium
- Cap is convex or flat
- Hymenium is adnate or adnexed
- Stipe has a cortina
- Spore print is brown
- Edibility is unknown

Pholiota molesta is a species of mushroom in the family Strophariaceae. It is a pyrophilous fungus, meaning that it grows in burned areas after fires.

== Description ==
The cap of Pholiota molesta is about 1–5 centimeters in diameter, and can be convex or flat. It starts out orangish brown or pinkish tan, and becomes browner as the mushroom gets older. The stipe is about 1.5–7 centimeters long and 0.5–1 centimeter wide, and is light in color, with a cortina. The gills are pale, becoming brown with age. The spore print is brown.

== Habitat and ecology ==
Pholiota molesta grows on burnt soil, often in firepits. It often fruits in large numbers after forest fires. It fruits during spring and fall. Several other species of Pholiota, as well as Crassisporium funariophilum, grow in the same habitat.
