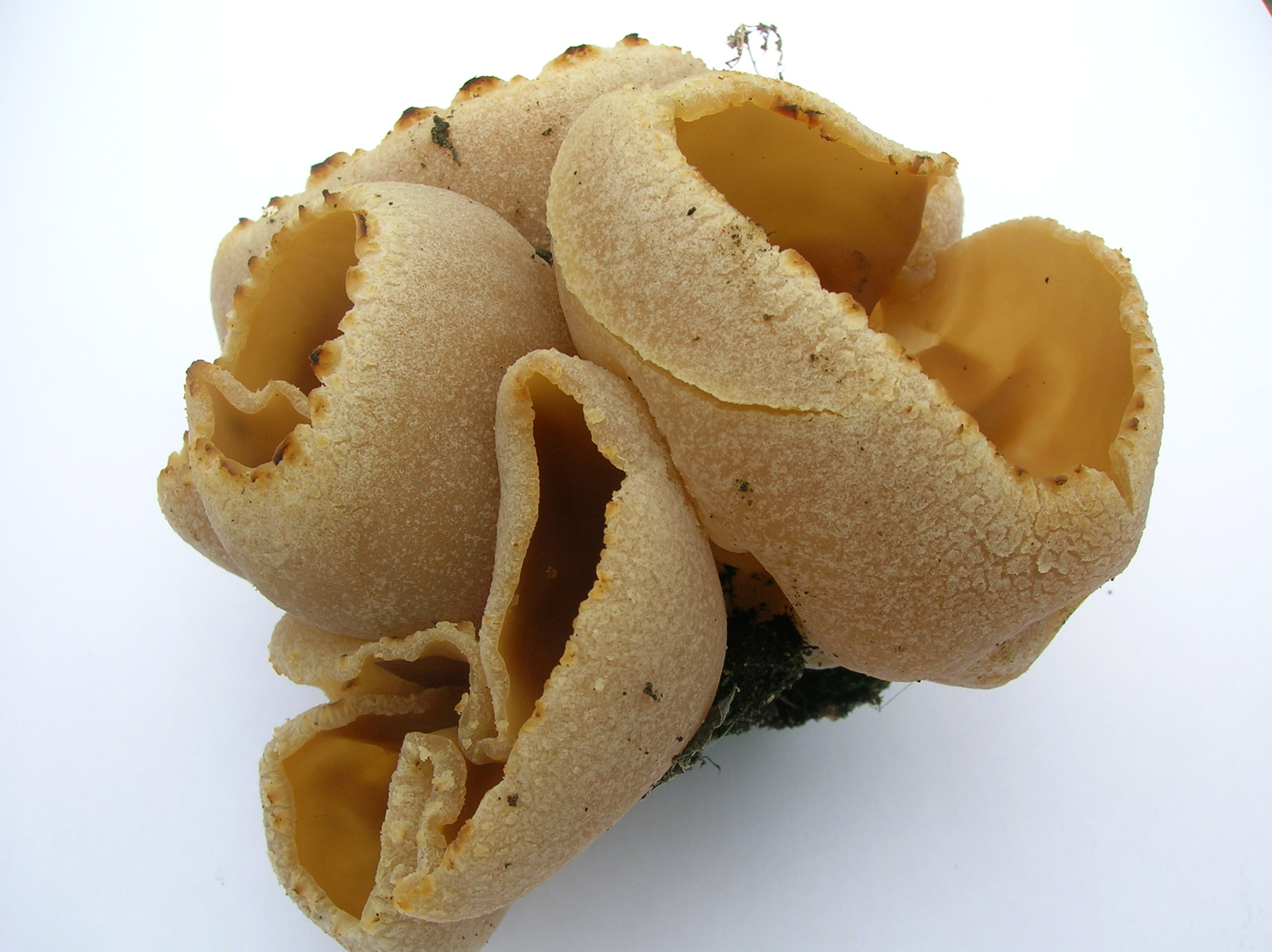

Scientific classification
- Kingdom: Fungi
- Division: Ascomycota
- Class: Pezizomycetes
- Order: Pezizales
- Family: Pezizaceae
- Genus: Peziza
- Species: P. cerea

Binomial name
- Peziza cerea Sow. (1796)

Synonyms
- Aleuria cerea (Sowerby) Gillet, (1881); Aleuria muralis (Sowerby) Boud., (1907); Aleuria tectoria (Cooke) Boud., (1907); Aleuria viridaria (Berk. & Broome) Boud., (1907); Galactinia cerea (Sowerby) (1962); Galactinia tectoria (Cooke); Galactinia vesiculosa f. cerea (Sowerby) (1960); Geopyxis muralis (Sowerby) (1889); Peziza muralis (Sowerby) (1887); Peziza tectoria Cooke, (1875); Peziza vesiculosa var. cerea (Sowerby) Massee; Peziza viridaria Berk. & Broome, (1871); Plicaria muralis (Sowerby) Rehm; Plicaria viridaria (Berk. & Broome) Rehm.

= Peziza cerea =

Species of fungus

Peziza cerea
- Mycological characteristics
- Smooth hymenium
- No distinct cap
- Hymenium attachment is not applicable
- Lacks a stipe
- Spore print is white to cream
- Ecology is saprotrophic
- Edibility is inedible

Peziza cerea, commonly known as the Cellar Cup is a species of ascomycete fungus in the genus Peziza, family Pezizaceae. In common with other ascomycetes the upper surface of the fungus has a layer of cylindrical spore producing cells called asci, from which the ascospores are forcibly discharged.

== Description ==
It is a yellow-grey to beige fungus internally, usually less than 5 cm across, with a granular or brittle flesh. The stipe is positioned laterally and may be small or even entirely absent. The spores are elliptical and smooth, with a spore print that ranges from white to cream or yellowish. The exterior of the cup is white in color.

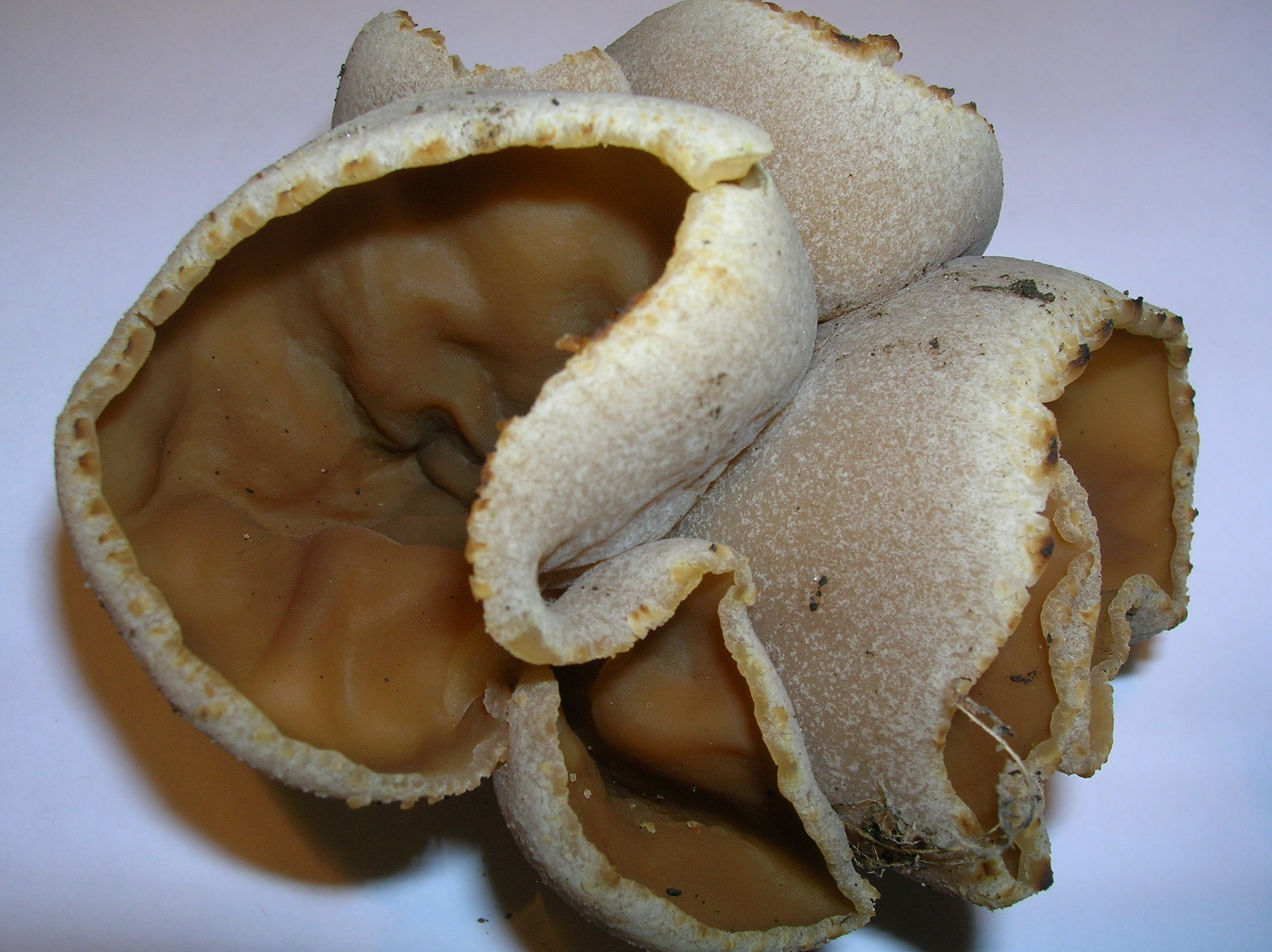
Detail of a cup found growing in gravel at the base of a wall

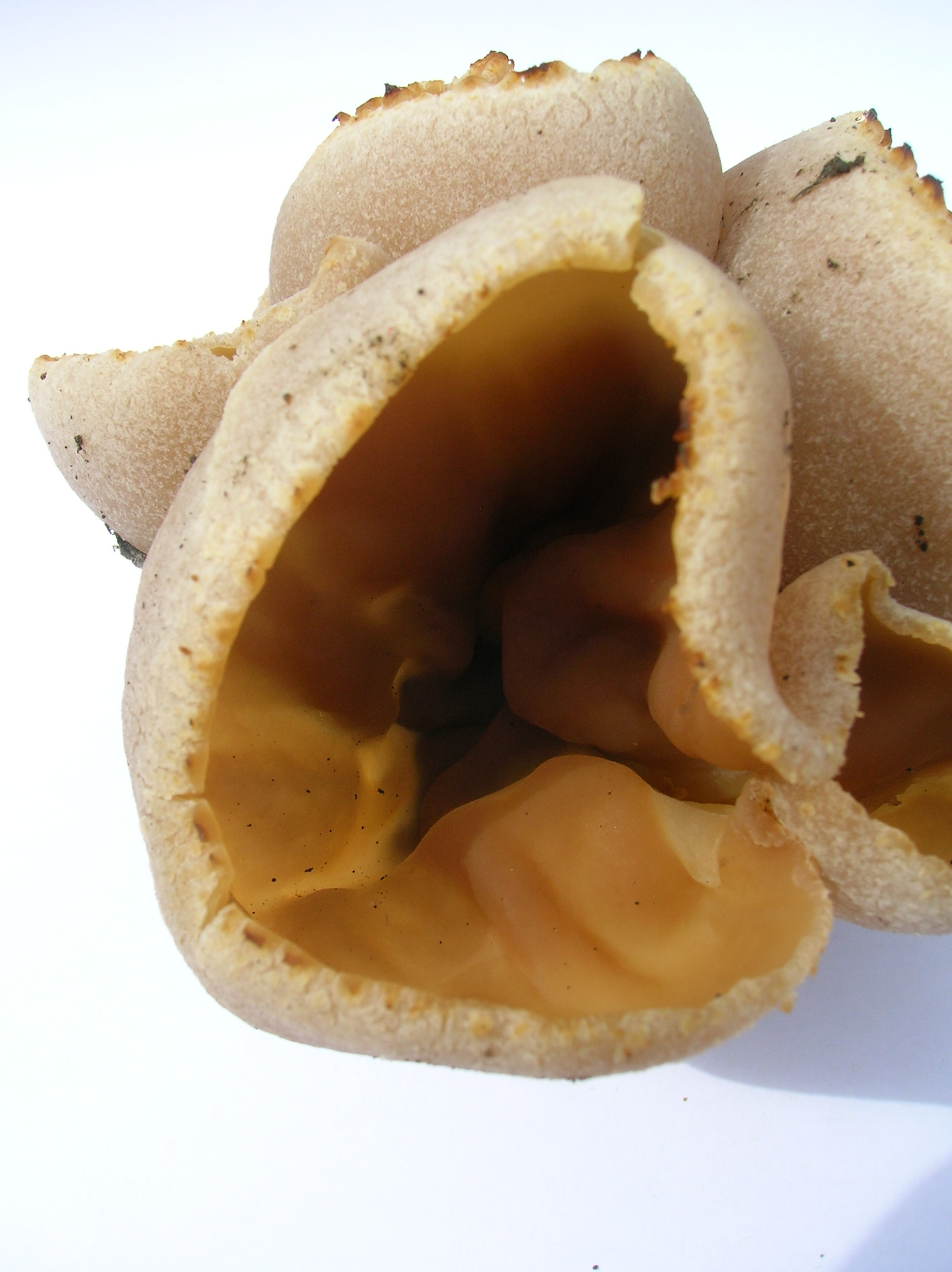
Fine detail of the cup fungus surface

=== Characteristics ===
Peziza cerea can be initially identified by its growth in cellars, damp mortar, soil between pavement slabs, on rotting sandbags, plant material or manure. Found all year round. Its upper surface (at maturity) is usually somewhat wrinkled near the centre; a whitish and minutely fuzzy under surface; a round, cuplike shape when young, and a flattened-irregular shape when mature. The hymenium contains asci, ascospores and paraphyses. Paraphyses are sterile cells' often with swollen tips and are at high turgor pressure. Tips of the paraphyses are very tightly together at the surface of the hymenium and create a barrier; the epithecium.

A high osmotic pressure in the cells of the epithecium prevent marauding microfauna that would otherwise penetrate and feed on the rich protoplasm below. To disperse spores, asci push between the paraphyses from below, shoot off their spores then collapse.

The name Peziza means a sort of mushroom without a root or stalk.

== Distribution ==
P. cerea is widely distributed throughout America and Europe.

== Ecology ==
Paths and cellars may sport the Cellar Cup fungus, which is saprobic.

== Edibility ==
P. cerea is inedible.

== See also ==
- Peziza
- Peziza repanda, the Palamino or Recurved Cup fungus
- Pezizomycetes
