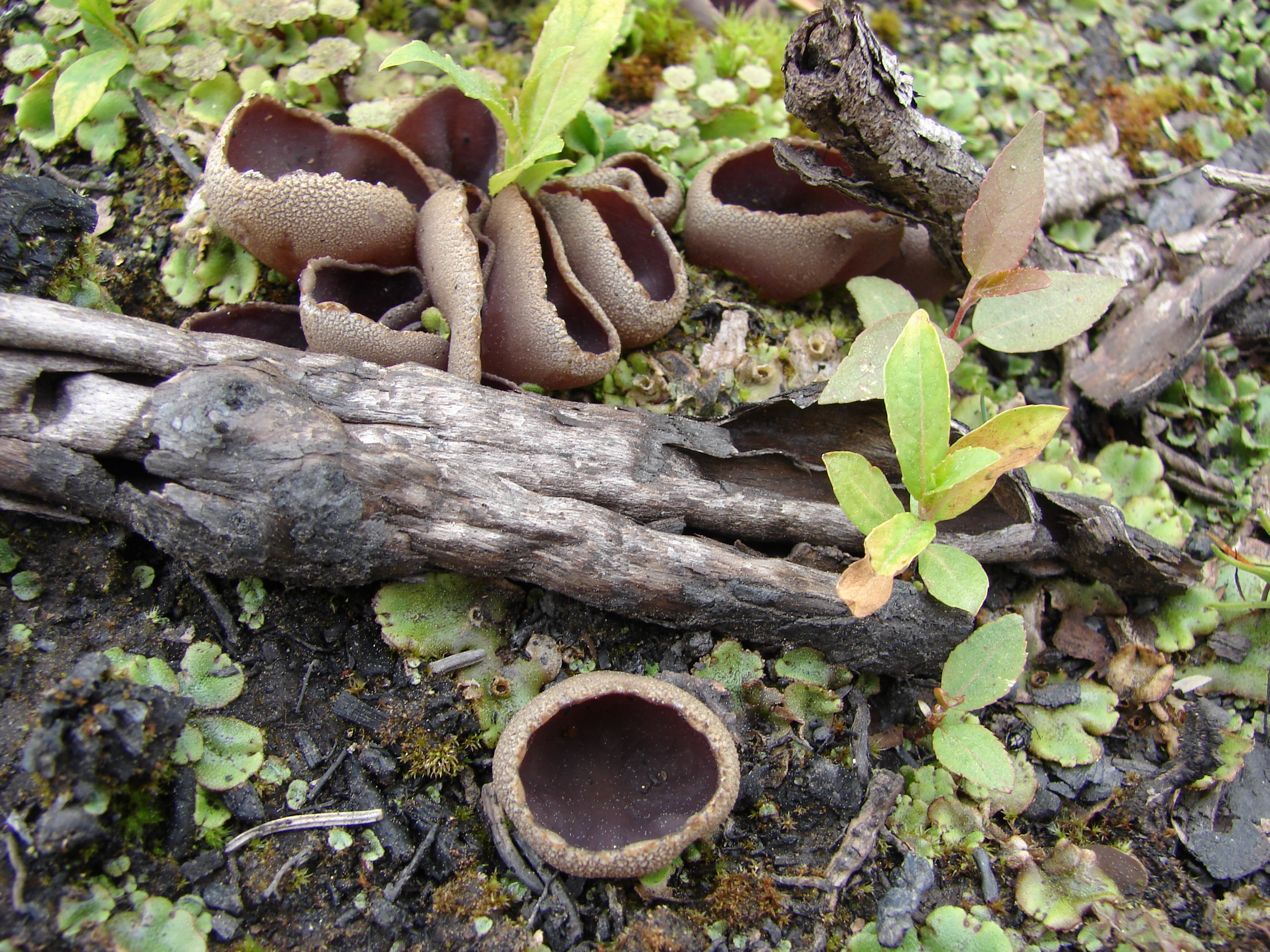
- Photographed in the Peace River area, British Columbia, Canada

Scientific classification
- Domain: Eukaryota
- Kingdom: Fungi
- Division: Ascomycota
- Class: Pezizomycetes
- Order: Pezizales
- Family: Pezizaceae
- Genus: Peziza
- Species: P. praetervisa

Binomial name
- Peziza praetervisa Bres. (1897)

Synonyms
- Pezizella obscurata Rehm (1905); Galactinia praetervisa (Bres.) Boud. (1907); Aleuria viridaria var. obscurata (Rehm) Boud. (1907); Aleuria praetervisa (Bres.) Bres. (1933); Galactinia praetervisa var. minor J.Moravec (1969)

= Peziza praetervisa =

Species of fungus

Peziza praetervisa, commonly known as the purple fairy cup or the fireplace cup, is a species of fungus in the genus Peziza, family Pezizaceae. Recognized by its flattened, purple, cup-like fruitbodies, this widespread fungus typically grows scattered or in clusters on burnt ground.

== Taxonomy ==
The fungus was first described scientifically in 1897 by Giacomo Bresadola.

== Description ==
Fruitbodies resemble flattened cups with diameters of up to 3 cm (1.2 in). The inner spore-bearing surface, the hymenium, is purple to purple-brown, but lightens to brown in age. The exterior surface is pale purple and scurfy (covered with small flakes or scales that are shed from the underlying surface). This species is sessile, and does not have a stipe. The flesh is thin and mauve-colored.

=== Microscopic characteristics ===
Spores are elliptical, hyaline, with small, fine warts on the surface, and have dimensions of 12–14 x 7–8 μm. They are biguttulate, containing two oil droplets at either end of the spore. The asci are 250–300 x 10–12 μm. Like other Pezizales, the asci open at maturity by means of an apical, lid-like flap of tissue termed an operculum. The paraphyses are club-shaped, filled with violet granules, and have bent tips; they are up to 7 μm wide.

== Edibility ==
The edibility of the Pezizaceae family is largely untested.

== Habitat and distribution ==
Peziza praetervisa is a widespread fungus that grows in scattered clusters on burned soil, and is often found on the remains of old campfires. It is found in Europe and North America.

== Similar species ==
Depending on humidity and other environmental factors, P. praetervisa can resemble Peziza violacea, but may be distinguished from the latter by its dark purple hymenium, and microscopically by its biguttulate, warty ascospores. Pachyella babingtonii also has a purple brown hymenium, but is smaller and translucent in appearance.
