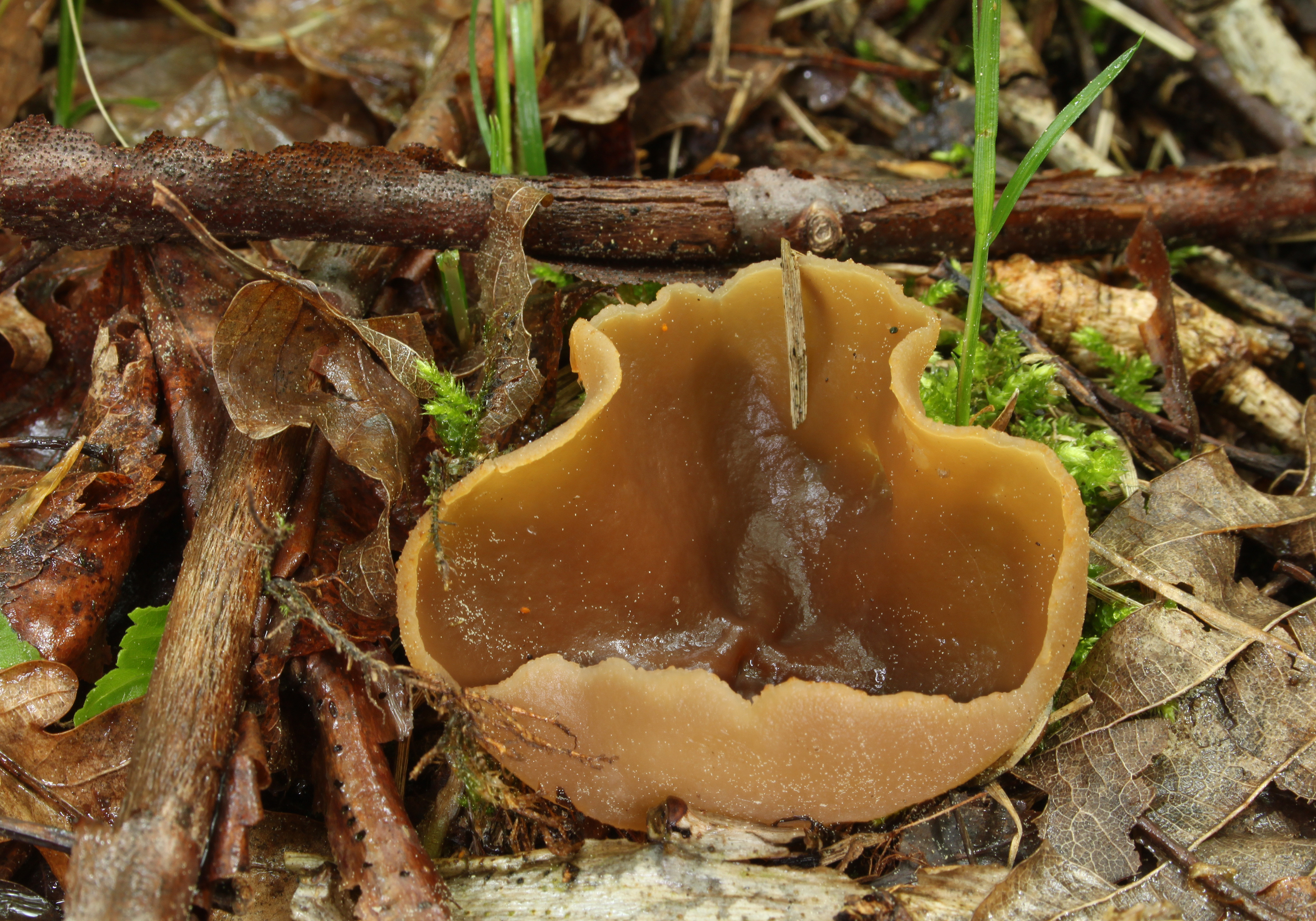

Scientific classification
- Kingdom: Fungi
- Division: Ascomycota
- Class: Pezizomycetes
- Order: Pezizales
- Family: Pezizaceae
- Genus: Peziza
- Species: P. arvernensis

Binomial name
- Peziza arvernensis Boud. (1879)

Synonyms
- Peziza sylvestris

= Peziza arvernensis =

Species of fungus

Peziza arvernensis, commonly known as the boring brown cup fungus or fairy tub, is a species of apothecial fungus belonging to the family Pezizaceae. The ascocarps appear as cups, growing up to 8 cm (3 1/8 in) across. Their exterior is pale tan and the interior is brown. Peziza vesiculosa and P. violacea are similar, young specimens of the latter having a violet hue.

This species often appears in small groups on soil in broad-leaved woodland, especially with beech. It is widespread in Europe with a few records from North and South America.
