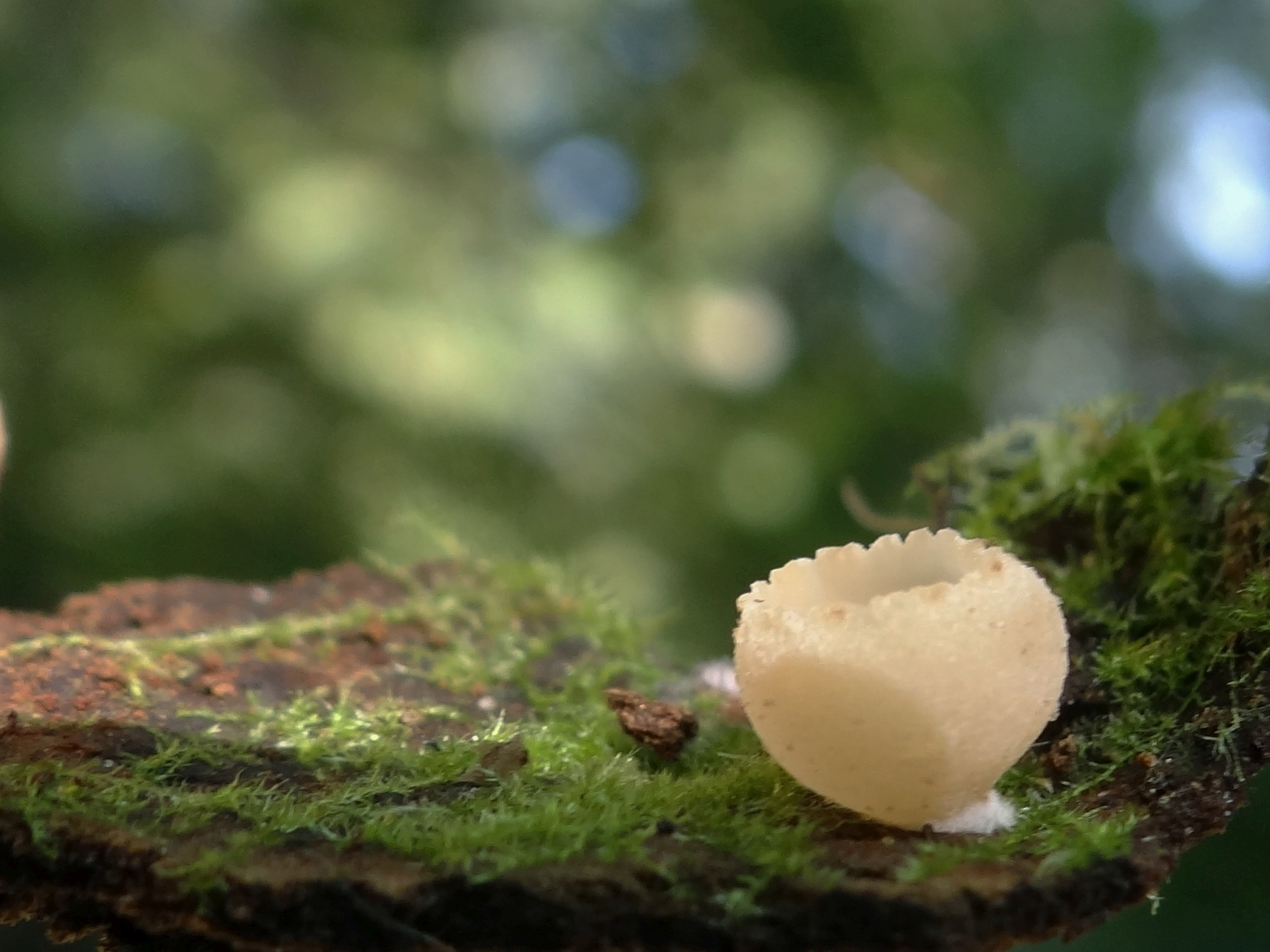
- Tarzetta cupularis

Scientific classification
- Domain: Eukaryota
- Kingdom: Fungi
- Division: Ascomycota
- Class: Pezizomycetes
- Order: Pezizales
- Family: Pyronemataceae
- Genus: Tarzetta (Cooke) Lambotte (1888)

Type species
- Tarzetta rapulum (Bull.) Rehm (1894)

Species
- T. catinus T. cupularis T. gaillardiana T. jafneospora T. scotica T. spurcata

Synonyms
- Pustulina Eckblad (1968)

= Tarzetta =

Genus of fungi

Tarzetta is a genus of fungi in the family Pyronemataceae. The genus has a widespread distribution in north temperate regions, and contains 9 species.
