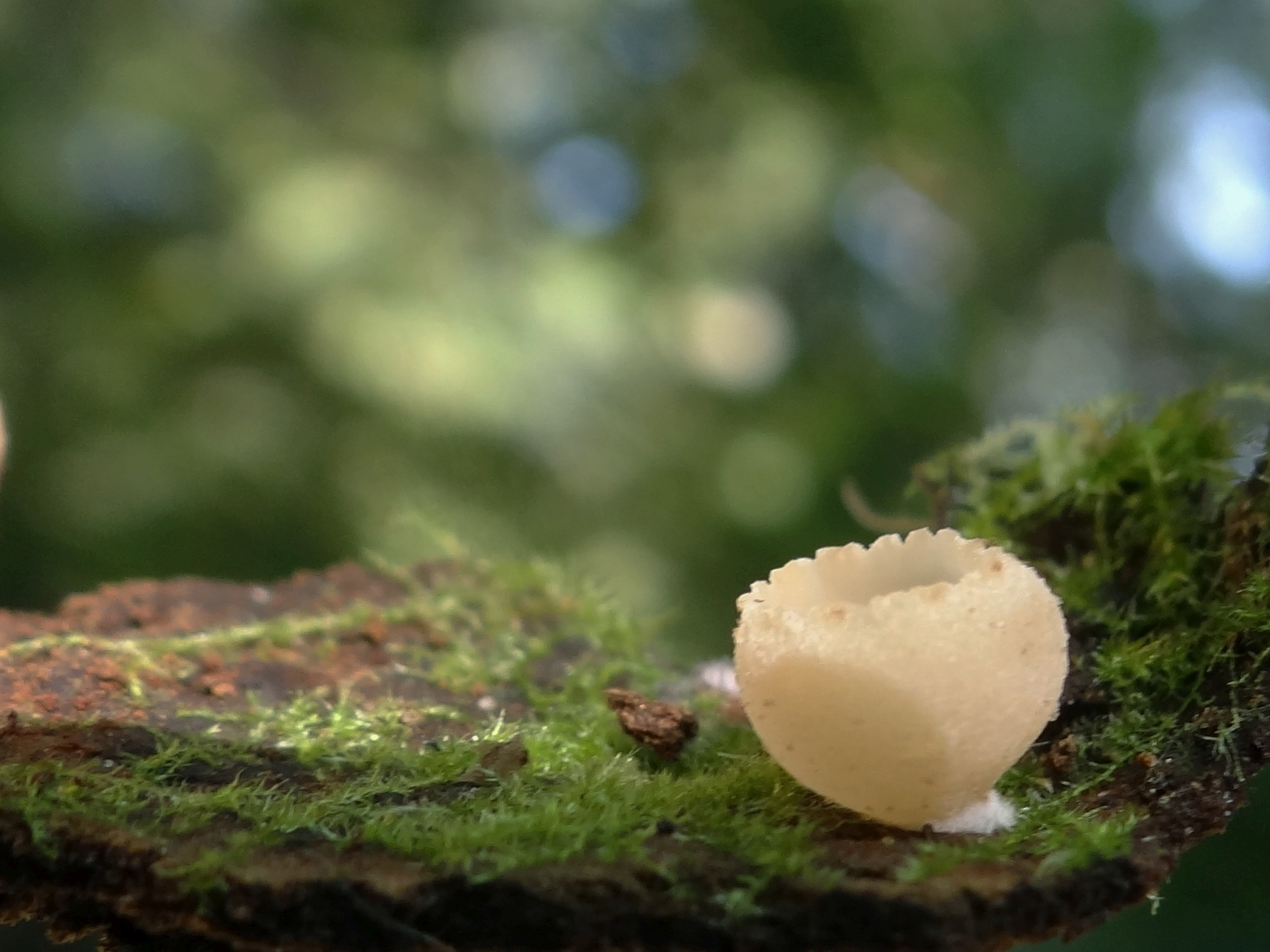

Scientific classification
- Kingdom: Fungi
- Division: Ascomycota
- Class: Pezizomycetes
- Order: Pezizales
- Family: Pyronemataceae
- Genus: Tarzetta
- Species: T. cupularis

Binomial name
- Tarzetta cupularis (L.) Svrček (1981)

Synonyms
- Peziza cupularis L. (1753)

= Tarzetta cupularis =

Species of fungus

Tarzetta cupularis is a species of apothecial fungus belonging to the family Pyronemataceae. This is a species of northern Europe with occasional records from further south in Spain and Morocco. It also occurs in North America. It appears from spring to autumn as brown to cream-coloured flask-shaped cups up to 2 cm across and 2.5 cm tall in groups in damp woodland. The related Tarzetta catinus tends to be larger with a more open cup, but the two species can only be reliably distinguished microscopically: by the shape of the spores (those of T. cupularis being narrower) and the paraphyses (those of T. cupularis lacking the distinctive lobed tips of T. catinus). T. cupularis is inedible.

== Other sources ==
- Jordan, Michael (2004). The Encyclopedia of Fungi of Britain and Europe. Frances Lincoln Publishers. p. 41. ISBN 978-0-7112-2379-0.
