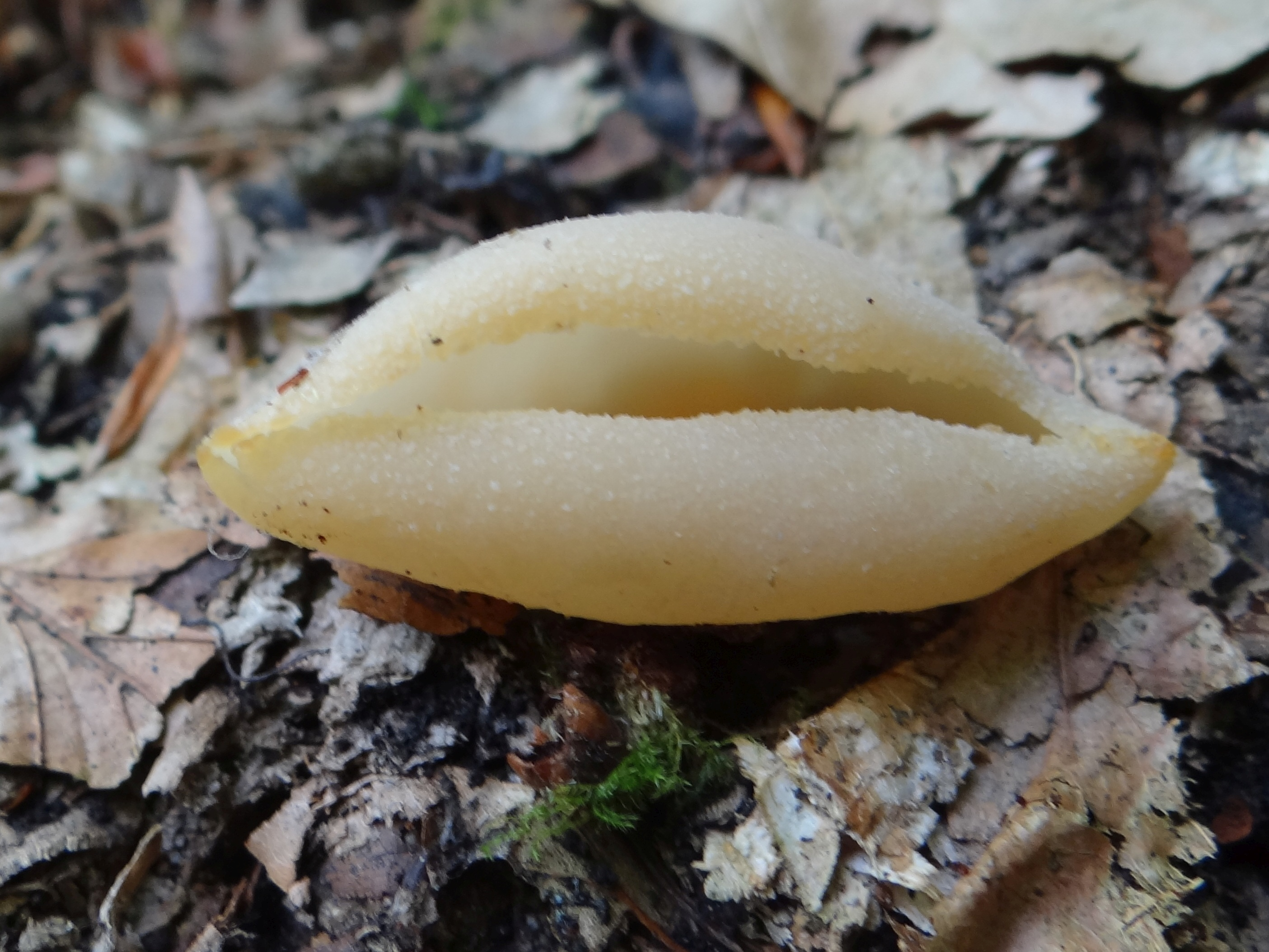

Scientific classification
- Domain: Eukaryota
- Kingdom: Fungi
- Division: Ascomycota
- Class: Pezizomycetes
- Order: Pezizales
- Family: Pyronemataceae
- Genus: Tarzetta
- Species: T. catinus

Binomial name
- Tarzetta catinus Holmsk., 1799

= Tarzetta catinus =

Species of fungus

Tarzetta catinus is a species of apothecial fungus belonging to the family Pyronemataceae. This is a largely European species with a few records from Mexico and the United States. It appears from spring to autumn as cream-coloured cups up to 5 cm across, usually in small groups among broad-leaved trees, especially beech. The rather similar Tarzetta cupularis is usually a smaller, deeper, flask-shaped cup, but the two species can only be reliably distinguished microscopically: by the shape of the spores (those of T. catinus being broader) and the paraphyses (those of T. catinus having distinctive lobed tips).

The species is inedible.
