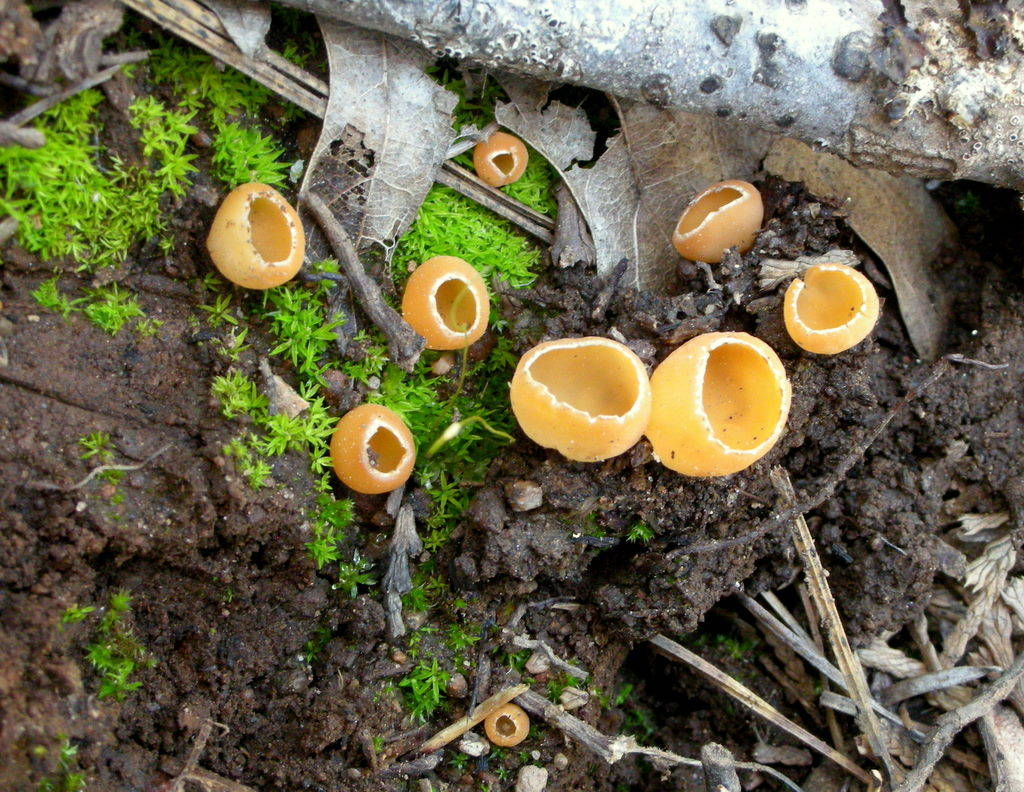

Scientific classification
- Kingdom: Fungi
- Division: Ascomycota
- Class: Pezizomycetes
- Order: Pezizales
- Family: Pyronemataceae
- Genus: Geopyxis
- Species: G. vulcanalis

Binomial name
- Geopyxis vulcanalis (Peck) Sacc. (1889)

Synonyms
- Peziza vulcanalis Peck (1878)

= Geopyxis vulcanalis =

Species of fungus

Geopyxis vulcanalis
- Mycological characteristics
- Smooth hymenium
- No distinct cap
- Hymenium attachment is irregular or not applicable
- Lacks a stipe
- Ecology is mycorrhizal
- Edibility is unknown

Geopyxis vulcanalis, commonly known as the vulcan pixie cup, is a species of cup fungus in the family Pyronemataceae. It was first described scientifically in 1878 by American mycologist Charles Horton Peck, from collections made in the Adirondack Mountains in Upstate New York. Pier Andrea Saccardo transferred it to the genus Geopyxis in 1889.

The fruit body is small and cup-like, growing to an extreme of 2 centimetres (3/4 in) across, with a light yellow hymenium. It becomes somewhat flattened in age. Its spores are smooth and elliptical, measuring 14–21 by 8–11 μm.

It grows on the ground in unburned conifer litter, often with mosses. Its edibility is unknown but it is too small to be culinary interest.
