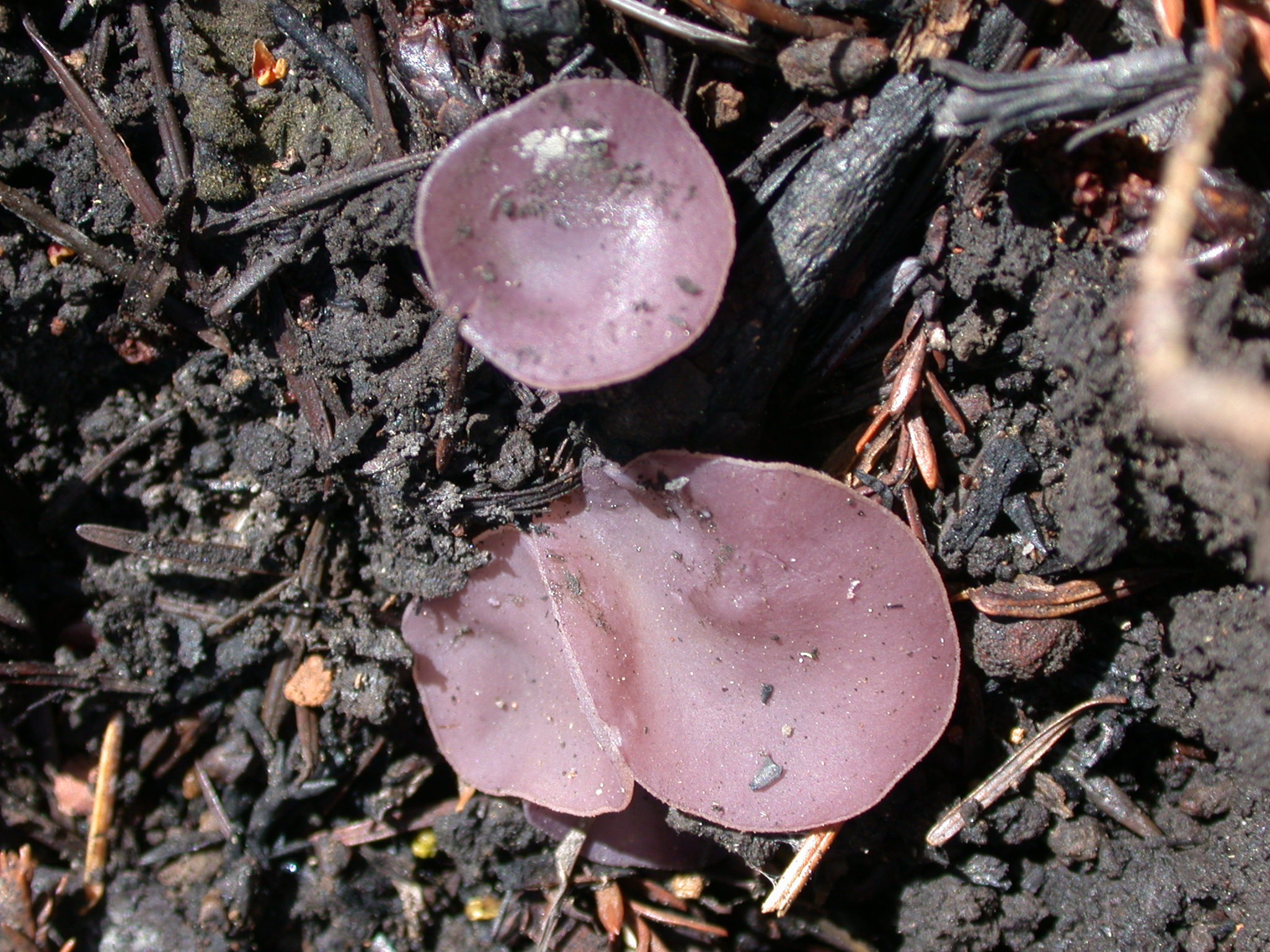

Scientific classification
- Kingdom: Fungi
- Division: Ascomycota
- Class: Pezizomycetes
- Order: Pezizales
- Family: Pezizaceae
- Genus: Peziza
- Species: P. violacea

Binomial name
- Peziza violacea Pers. (1794)

= Peziza violacea =

Species of fungus

Peziza violacea
- Mycological characteristics
- Smooth hymenium
- Hymenium attachment is irregular or not applicable
- Lacks a stipe
- Ecology is saprotrophic
- Edibility is unknown

Peziza violacea, commonly known as the violet fairy cup or the violet cup fungus, is a species of fungus in the genus Peziza of the family Pezizaceae. As both it common names and specific epithet suggest, the cup-shaped fruiting bodies are violet colored on the interior surface. P. violacea is typically found growing on burnt soil.

== Description ==
Fruiting bodies are initially almost spherical, then cup-shaped, then expanding to being somewhat flattened in age. They do not have a stem (or at most a short, narrowed version), and may be up to 3 centimetres (1.2 in) wide by 1–1.5 cm tall, although they are often much smaller. The inner spore-bearing surface of the cup, the hymenium, is pale violet to reddish violet in color, often centrally depressed and slightly wrinkled. The flesh is thin (0.5–2.0 mm thick) and pale purple. The exterior surface is paler than the interior, somewhat grayish, and may be pruinose near the margins—having a very fine whitish powder on the surface. The odor and taste are not distinctive.

=== Microscopic characteristics ===
The spores are elliptical, smooth, hyaline, without any oil droplets (eguttulate), with dimensions of 16–17 × 8–10 μm. The asci are roughly cylindrical, 8-spored 200–250 × 12–15 μm. The paraphyses are club-shaped, filled with violet granules, and have curved tips; they are up to 8 μm wide.

=== Similar species ===
The closely related Peziza praetervisa is also violet-colored and prefers growing on burned ground. In general, P. praetervisa is more purple- rather than violet-colored like P. violacea. However, fruiting body color can vary depending on humidity and other factors, so they are more reliably distinguished microscopically—P. praetervisa has rough, not smooth spores with two polar oil drops. P. proteana also prefers burned ground, but is paler in color, being white or pinkish.

== Habitat and distribution ==
Peziza violacea is widespread on burned soil and charred wood. It typically grows scattered or in groups. It is found in North America, Europe, and Iceland.

== Edibility ==
The species is considered inedible.
