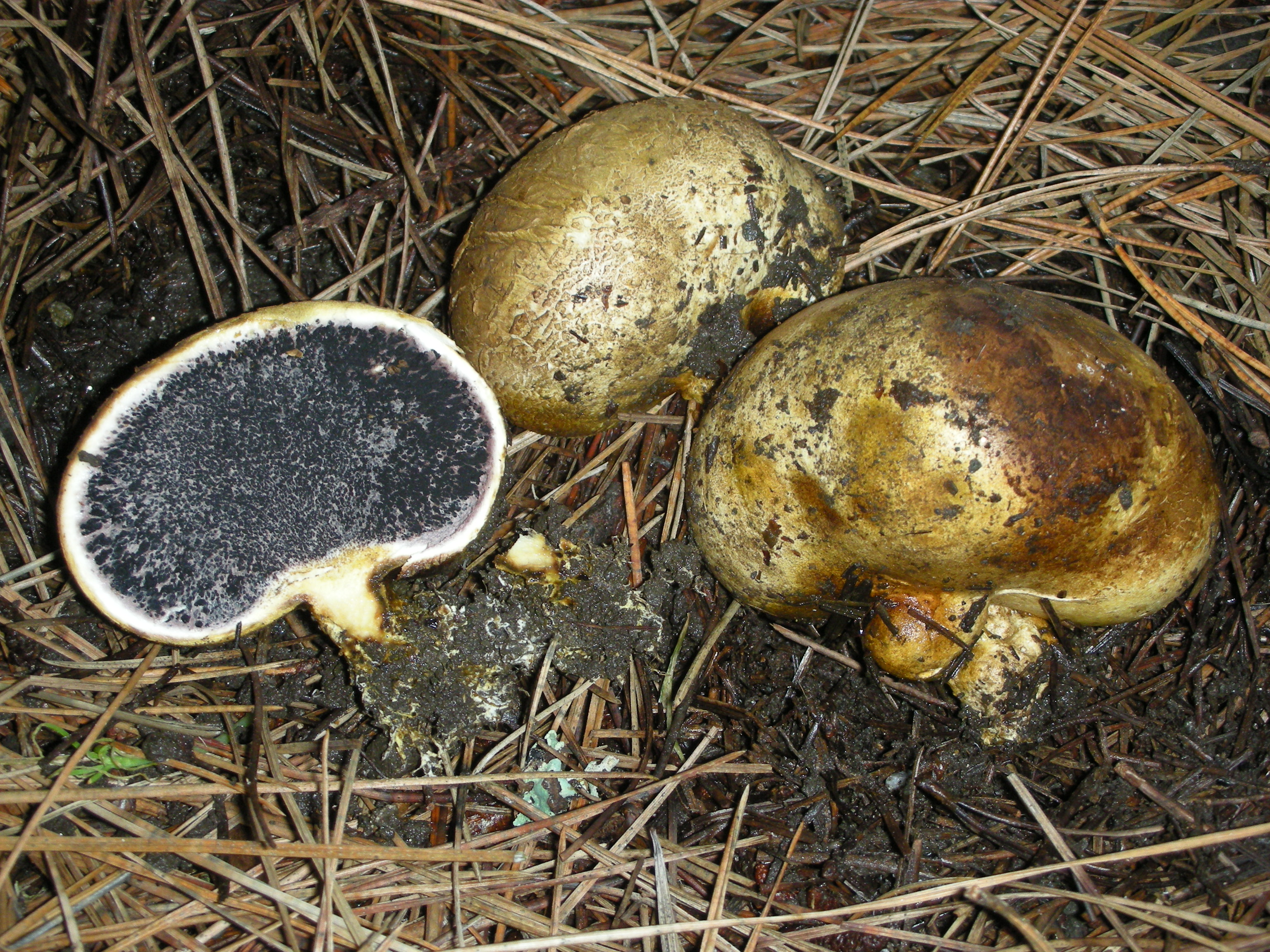
- Scleroderma cepa

Scientific classification
- Kingdom: Fungi
- Division: Basidiomycota
- Class: Agaricomycetes
- Order: Boletales
- Suborder: Sclerodermatineae; Manfr.Binder & Bresinsky (2002)

Families
- Boletinellaceae; Diplocystaceae; Gyroporaceae; Sclerodermataceae

= Sclerodermatineae =

Suborder of the fungal order Boletales

Sclerodermatineae is a suborder of the fungal order Boletales. Circumscribed in 2002 by mycologists Manfred Binder and Andreas Bresinsky, it contains nine genera and about 80 species. The suborder contains a diverse assemblage fruit body morphologies, including boletes, gasteroid forms, earthstars (genus Astraeus), and puffballs. Most species are ectomycorrhizal, although the ecological role of some species is not known with certainty. The suborder is thought to have originated in the late Cretaceous (145–66 Ma) in Asia and North America, and the major genera diversified around the mid Cenozoic (66–0 Ma).

== Taxonomy ==
The Sclerodermatineae was first legitimately used by Manfred Binder and Andreas Bresinsky in 2002 based on molecular analyses of nuclear ribosomal large subunit (25S) rRNA sequences from 60 species of Boletales. This research was an extension of Binder's 1999 graduate work, in which he argued for the need to recognize the molecular differences of the sclerodermatoid fungi. Sclerodermatineae is one of six lineages of the Boletales recognized as a suborder; the others are the Boletineae, Paxillineae, Suillineae, Tapinellineae, and Coniophorineae. Of the nine genera assigned to the Sclerodermatineae, three are hymenomycetes (Boletinellus, Gyroporus, and Phlebopus), and six are gasteroid (Astraeus, Calostoma, Diplocystis, Pisolithus, and Scleroderma). Since the suborder's original description, there have been several phylogenetic studies investigating the Sclerodermatineae. Some studies have revealed the existence of numerous cryptic species and have contributed to taxonomic expansion of the group. The "core" Sclerodermatineae include the genera Astraeus, Calostoma, Scleroderma, Pisolithus, Diplocystis, Tremellogaster (all gasteroid), and the boletoid genus Gyroporus; Phlebopus and Boletinellus resolved as sister to this core group.

As of 2012, there are an estimated 78 species in the Sclerodermatineae. (Note: This tally does not include the poorly known genera Endogonopsis, Chlorogaster, Favillea, and Horakiella.) The type of the suborder is the family Sclerodermataceae; other families in the suborder are the Boletinellaceae, Diplocystaceae, and the Gyroporaceae.

- Boletinellaceae

- Boletinellus (2 species)
- Phlebopus (12 species)

- Diplocystaceae

- Astraeus (5 species)
- Diplocystis (1 species)
- Endogonopsis (1 species)
- Tremellogaster (1 species)

- Gyroporaceae

- Gyroporus (10 species)

- Sclerodermataceae

- Calostoma (15 species)
- Chlorogaster (1 species)
- Favillea (1 species)
- Horakiella (1 species)
- Pisolithus (5 species)
- Scleroderma (about 30 species)

Based on ancestral reconstruction studies, the earliest (basal) members of the Sclerodermatineae originated in the late Cretaceous (145–66 Ma). The major genera diversified near the mid Cenozoic (66–0 Ma). Asia and North America are the most probable ancestral areas for all Sclerodermatineae, and Pinaceae and angiosperms (primarily rosids) are the most probable ancestral hosts.

== Description ==
Members of the Sclerodermatineae have fruit body shapes ranging from boletoid (with a cap, stipe, and tubes on the underside of the cap) to gasteroid. Boletoid fruit bodies sometimes have hollow stipes with a surface that is smooth to somewhat furfuraceous (covered with flaky particles), and lack the reticulation (a net-like pattern of interlacing lines) characteristic of some members of the Boletaceae. The pores are merulioid (wrinkled with low, uneven ridges), boletinoid, and either fine or coarse. The flesh is usually whitish to yellowish, and some species exhibit a blue staining reaction upon injury. In mass, spores are yellow; microscopically, the spores are ellipsoid in shape and have a smooth surface.

Gasteroid fruit body types are either roughly spherical or tuberous, occasionally with stipes, and usually have a peridium that is either simple or multi-layered. Mature gasteroid fruit bodies generally open irregularly at maturity to expose a powdery gleba with a color ranging from white to yellow or black-brown to black. Capillitia are generally absent from the gleba. Spores are spherical or nearly so, and have a surface texture that ranges from smooth to wart-like and spiny, or sometimes with reticulations. Hyphae have clamp connections.

== Morphological diversity ==
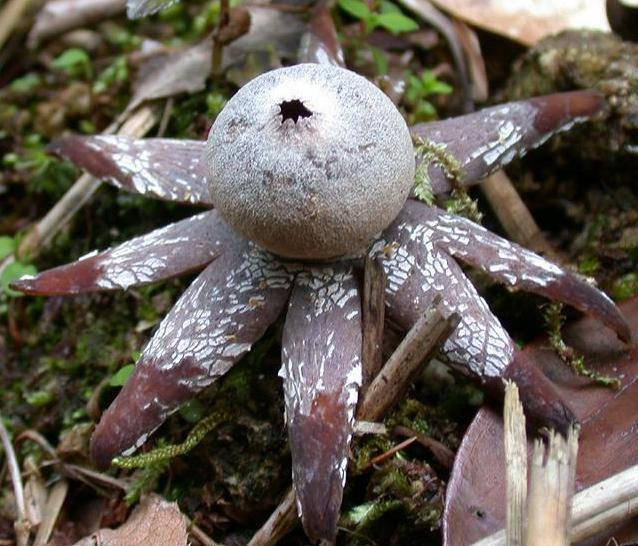
Astraeus hygrometricus

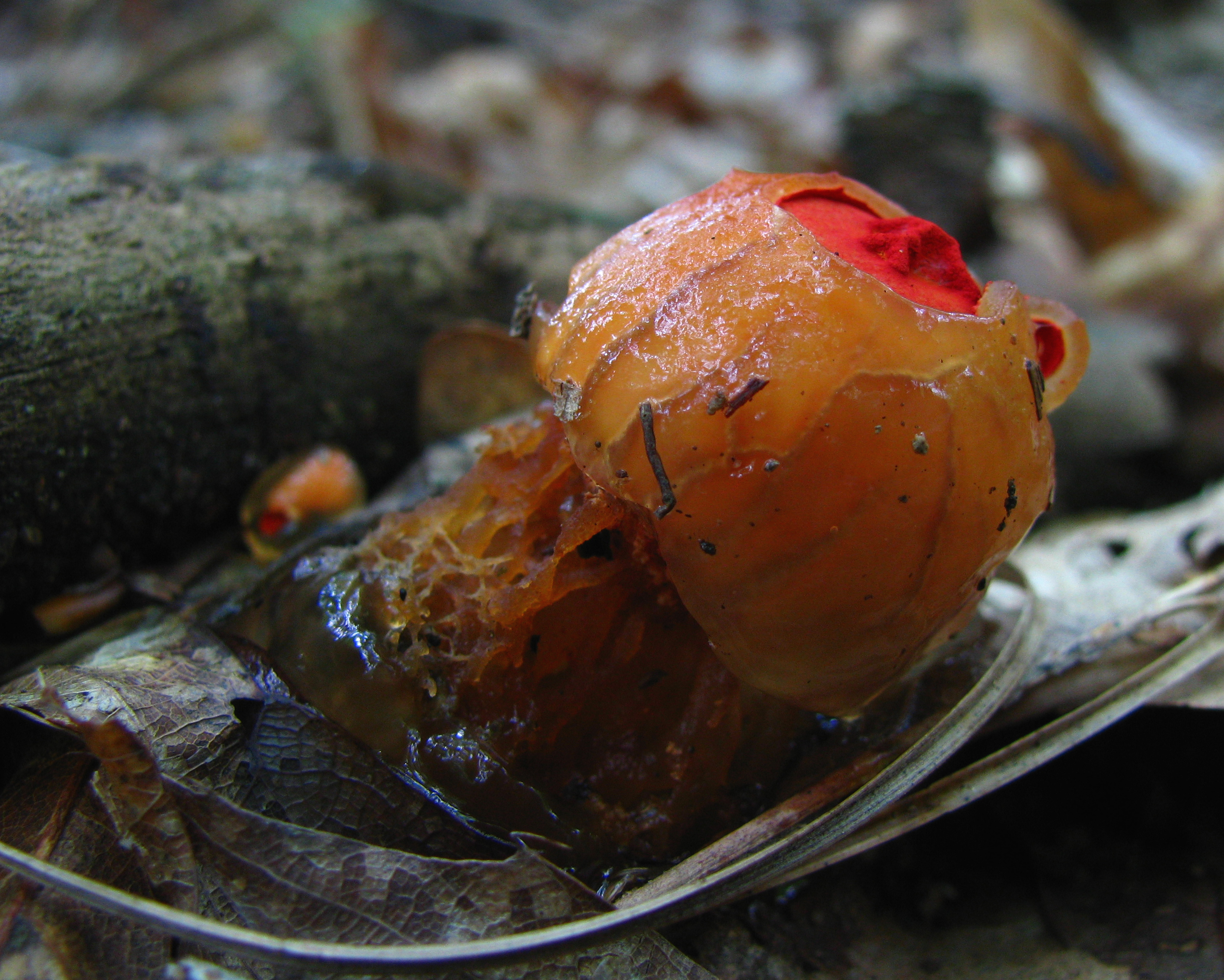
Calostoma cinnabarinum

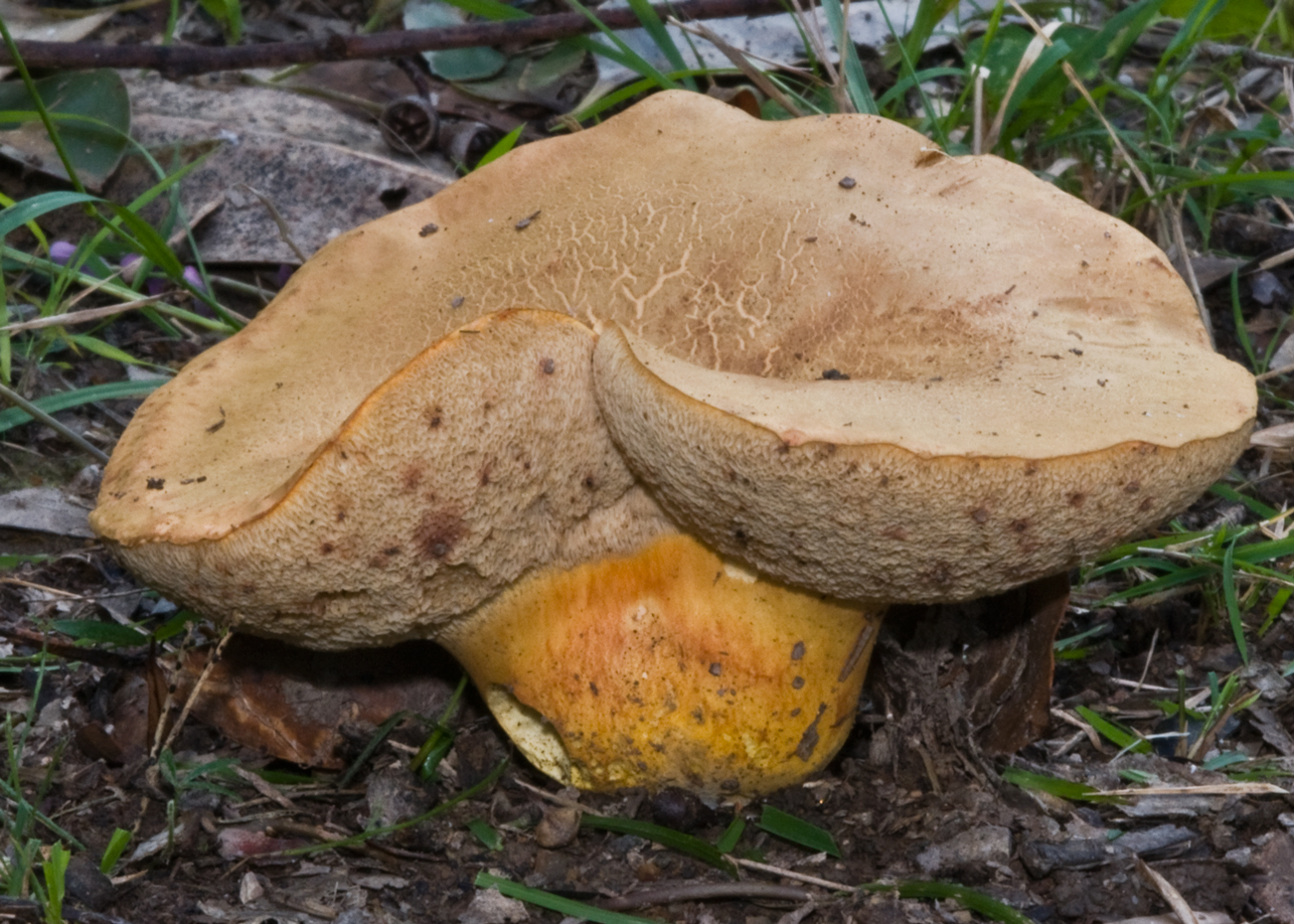
Phlebopus marginatus

Examples of the morphological diversity of the Sclerodermatineae

A distinguishing feature of the Sclerodermatineae is the diversity of morphologies within the group. The hymenomycete genera Boletinellus, Gyroporus, and Phlebopus are typical boletes with a cap and stipe. However, each of the gasteroid Sclerodermatineae has a distinct morphology. Species of Astraeus have an "earthstar" morphology where the outer peridium peels back in sections. The gleba of Pisolithus is partitioned into hundreds of membranous chambers. Scleroderma is a simple puffball with a thin outer skin and a powdery gleba at maturity. Diplocystis and Tremellogaster are each distinct in their morphologies: the former comprises compound fruit bodies each with 3–60 spore sacs crowded together, while the latter forms a roughly spherical sporocarp with a thick multi-layered peridium. Calostoma (Greek for "pretty mouth") is morphologically distinct from other gasteroid members, having a fruit body that forms a globed, spore-bearing head composed of a three-layered peridium. About two-thirds of Sclerodermatineae species have a gasteroid morphology, although this may be an underestimate due to the existence of cryptic species that have yet to be formally described. For example, studies of the gasteroid genera Astraeus and Pisolithus indicate the existence of numerous cryptic taxa.

== Ecology ==
The mycorrhizal associations of several Sclerodermatineae genera have been established. Studies have demonstrated that Astraeus, Pisolithus, and Scleroderma form ectomycorrhizal associations with both angiosperms and gymnosperms. Previously thought to be saprophytic, the Calostomataceae were determined to be ectomycorrhizal with Fagaceae and Myrtaceae using isotopic and molecular analyses. Species from the genera Pisolithus and Scleroderma have been used in forestry as mycorrhizal inocula to help promote the growth and vigor of young seedlings.

As a group, the Sclerodermatineae have a broad distribution, and some genera (Pisolithus and Scleroderma) have been found on all continents except Antarctica.
