= List of Scleroderma species =

Fungi in the genus Scleroderma

This is a list of species in the fungal genus Scleroderma (order Boletales).

== List of species ==
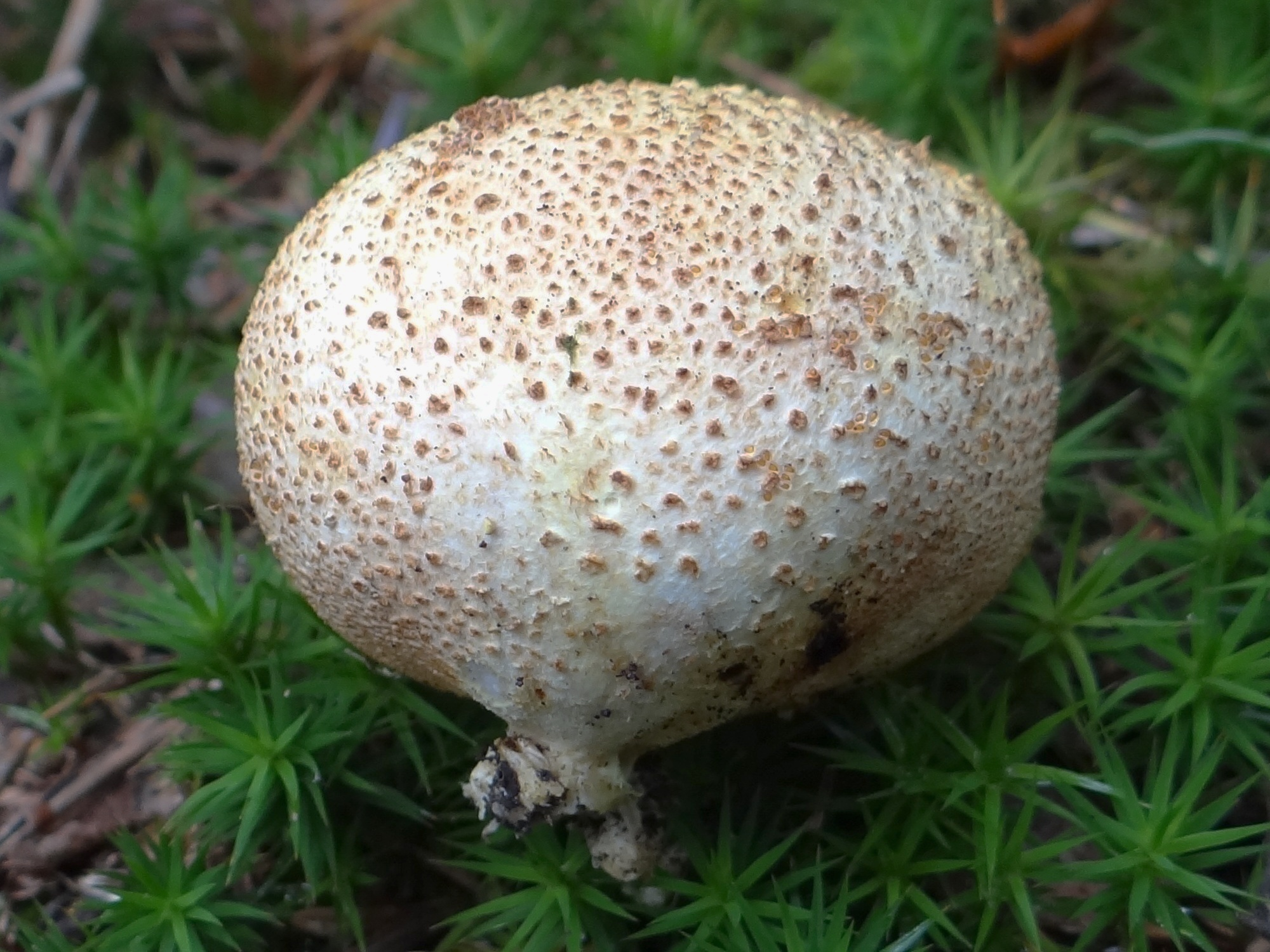
Scleroderma areolatum

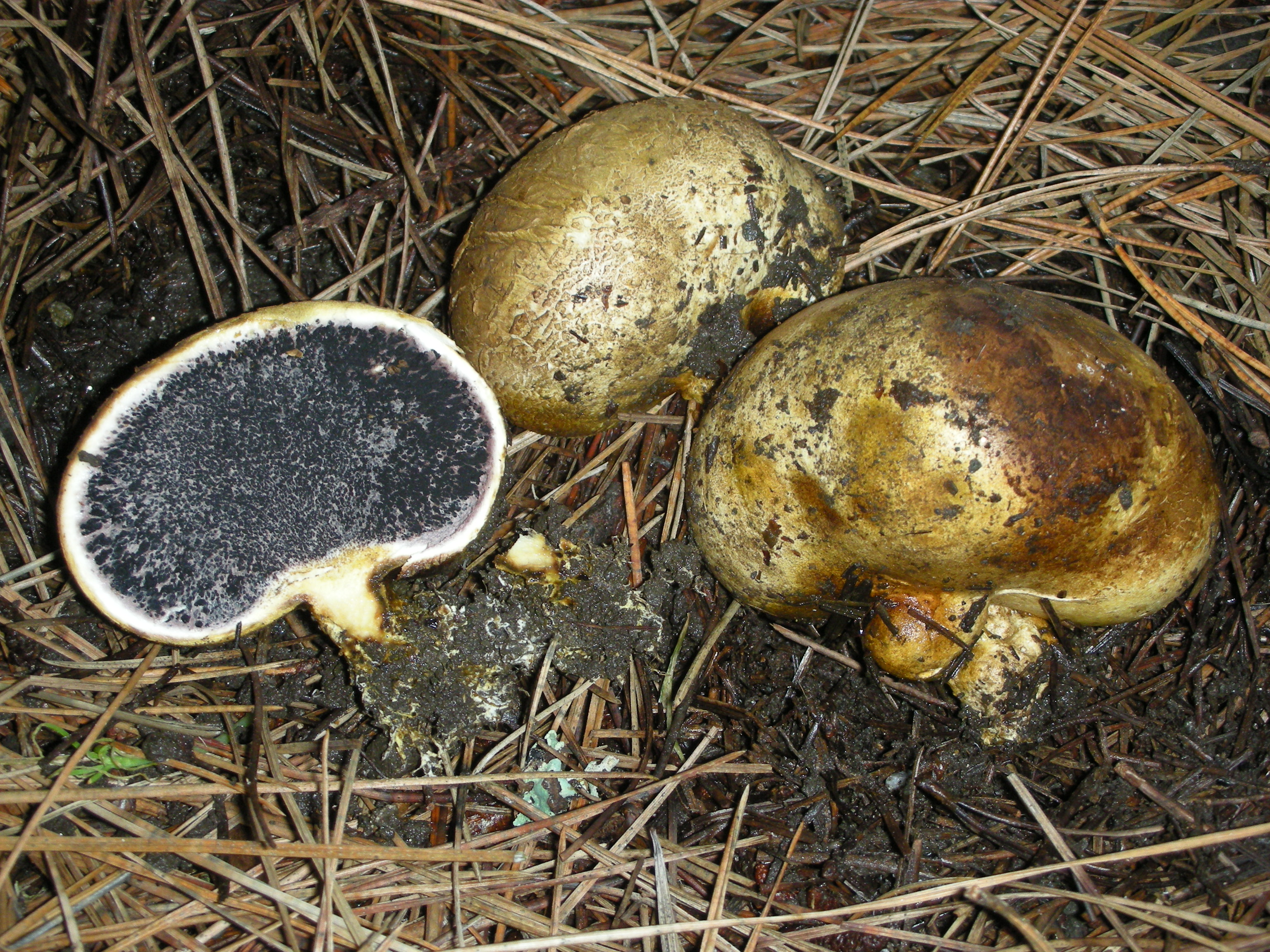
Scleroderma cepa

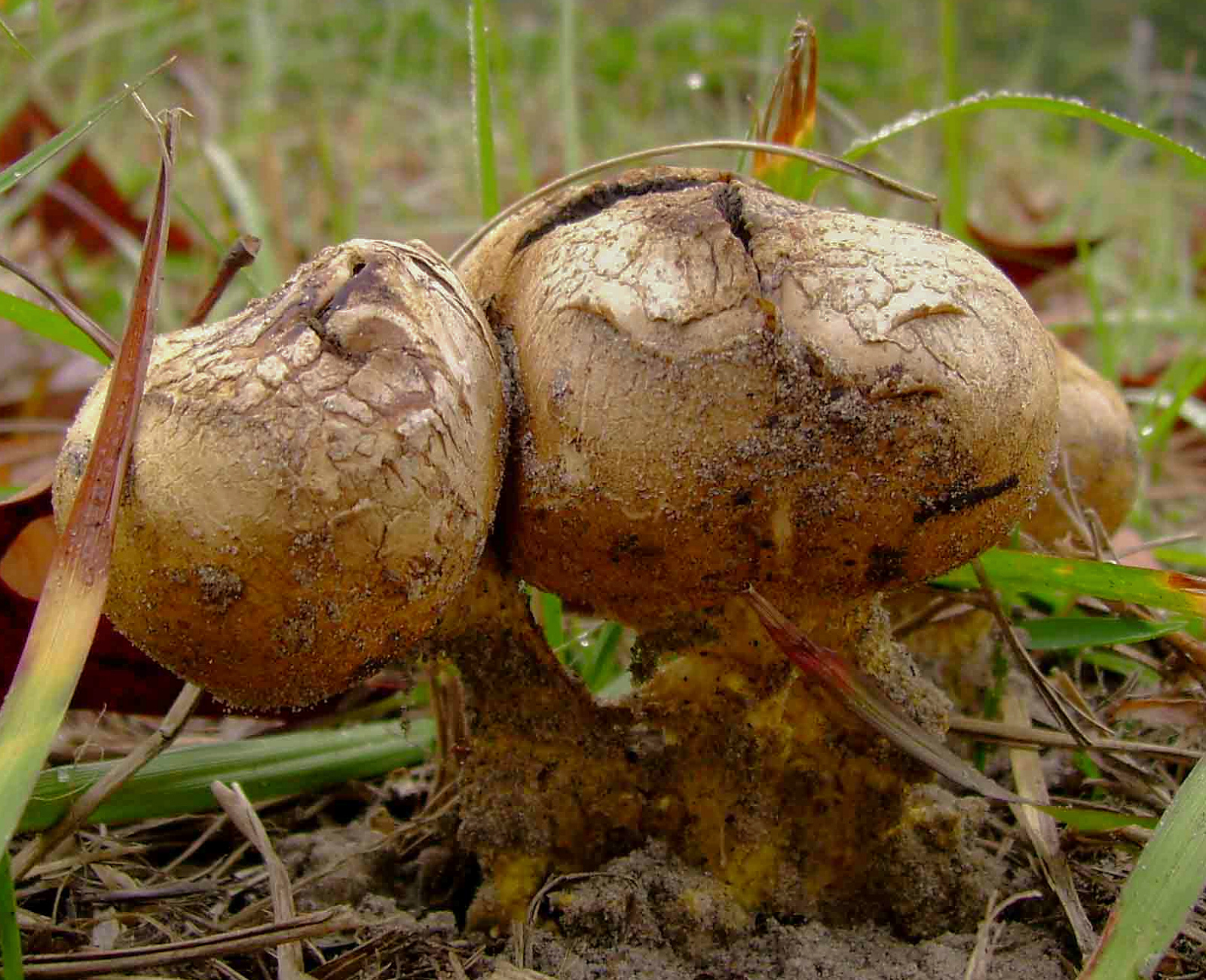
Scleroderma meridionale

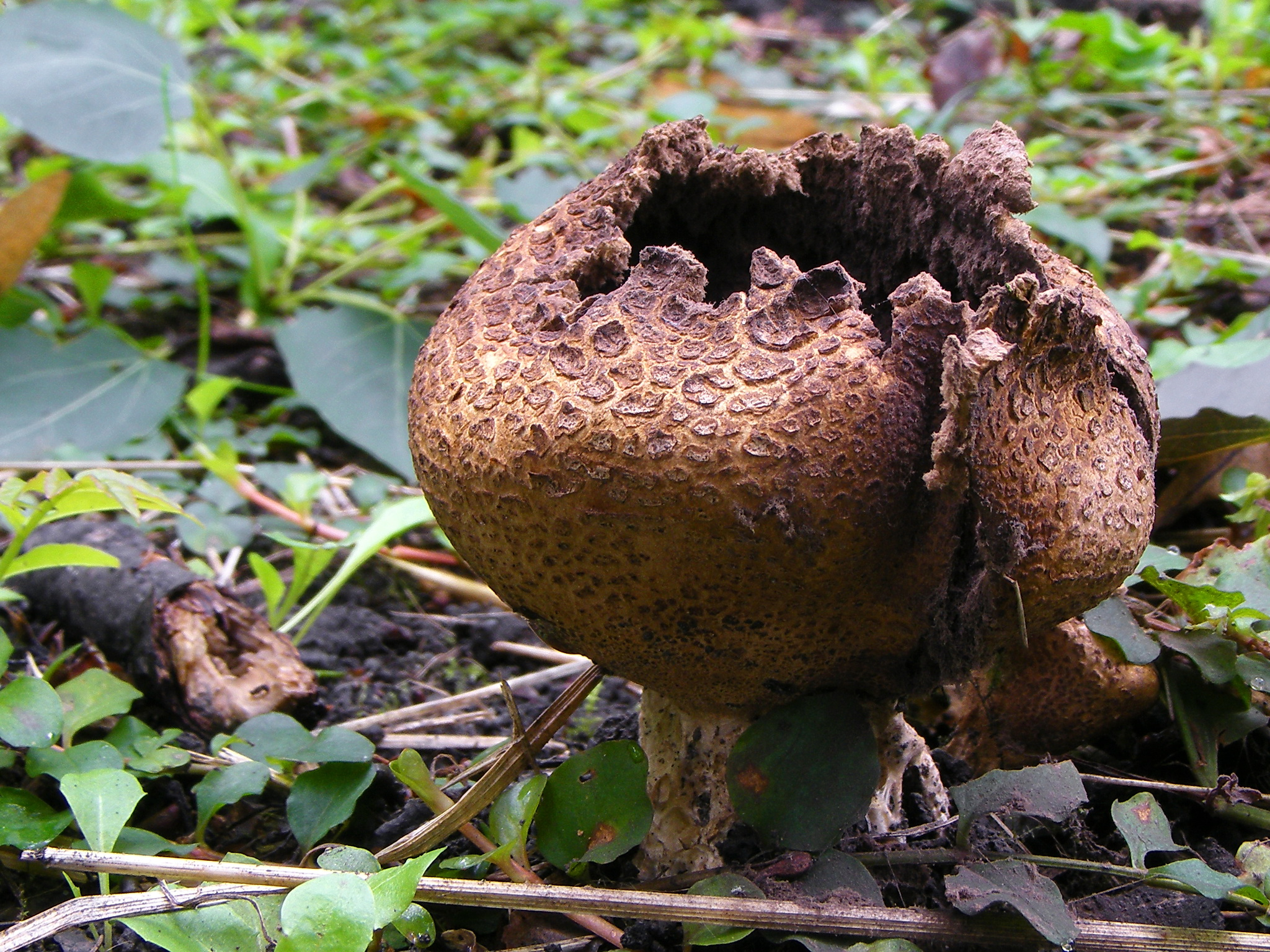
Scleroderma verrucosum

- Scleroderma albidum Pat. & Trab. (1899)
- Scleroderma anomalosporum Baseia, B.D.B. Silva & M.P. Martín (2016)
- Scleroderma arenicola Zeller (1947)
- Scleroderma areolatum Ehrenb. (1818)
- Scleroderma australe Massee (1889)
- Scleroderma bermudense Coker (1939)
- Scleroderma bougheri Trappe, Castellano & Giachini (2000) – Brazil
- Scleroderma bovista Fr. (1829)
- Scleroderma bulla R.Heim (1966)
- Scleroderma camassuense M.P. Martín, Baseia & B.D.B. Silva (2016)
- Scleroderma capeverdeanum M.P. Martín, M. Dueñas & Tellería (2016)
- Scleroderma cepa Pers. (1801)
- Scleroderma chevalieri Guzmán (1967) – Mexico
- Scleroderma chrysastrum G.W.Martin (1954)
- Scleroderma citrinum Pers. (1801)
- Scleroderma coelatum (Pat.) Sacc. & P. Syd. (1902)
- Scleroderma columnare Berk. & Broome (1873)
- Scleroderma congolense Demoulin & Dring (1971)
- Scleroderma cyaneoperidiatum Watling & K.P.Sims (2004) – Malaysia
- Scleroderma dictyosporum Pat. (1896)
- Scleroderma duckei B.D.B. Silva, M.P. Martín & Baseia (2016)
- Scleroderma dunense B.D.B. Silva, Sulzbacher, Grebenc, Baseia & M.P. Martín (2016)
- Scleroderma echinatum (Petri) Guzmán (1967)
- Scleroderma echinosporites Rouse (1962)
- Scleroderma endoxanthum Petch (1919)
- Scleroderma flavidum Ellis & Everh. (1885)
- Scleroderma floridanum Guzmán (1967)
- Scleroderma franceschii Macchione (2000)
- Scleroderma furfurellum Zeller (1947)
- Scleroderma guzmanii Ortiz-Rivero, Watling, Guzm.-Dáv. & M.P. Martín (2021)
- Scleroderma hakkodense Kobayasi (1986)
- Scleroderma hypogaeum Zeller (1922)
- Scleroderma laeve Lloyd (1916)
- Scleroderma leptopodium Pat. & Har. (1908)
- Scleroderma lycoperdoides Schwein. (1822)
- Scleroderma macrosporum (G. Cunn.) J.A. Cooper (2023)
- Scleroderma mayama Grgur. (1997)
- Scleroderma mcalpinei (Rodway) Castellano (1993)
- Scleroderma meridionale Demoulin & Malençon (1971)
- Scleroderma michiganense (Guzmán) Guzmán (1970)
- Scleroderma minutisporum Baseia, Alfredo & Cortez (2012)
- Scleroderma multiloculare Dring & Rayss (1964)
- Scleroderma nastii Raut (2020)
- Scleroderma nitidum Berk. (1854)
- Scleroderma pantherinum Mattir. (1931)
- Scleroderma paradoxum G.W.Beaton (1982)
- Scleroderma patagonicum Nouhra & Hern.Caff. (2012) – Argentina
- Scleroderma poltaviense Sosin (1952)
- Scleroderma polyrhizum (J.F.Gmel.) Pers. (1801)
- Scleroderma pseudostipitatum Petch (1919)
- Scleroderma radicans Lloyd (1908)
- Scleroderma reae Guzmán (1967)
- Scleroderma rhodesicum Verwoerd (1926)
- Scleroderma sapidiforme Sosin (1959)
- Scleroderma schmitzii Demoulin & Dring (1971)
- Scleroderma septentrionale Jeppson (1998) – Northern Europe
- Scleroderma sinnamariense Mont. (1840)
- Scleroderma stellenbossiense Verwoerd (1926)
- Scleroderma suthepense Kumla, Suwannarach & Lumyong (2013) – Thailand
- Scleroderma texense Berk. (1845)
- Scleroderma torrendii Bres. (1902)
- Scleroderma tuberoideum Speg. (1906)
- Scleroderma uruguayense (Guzmán) Guzmán (1970)
- Scleroderma verrucosum (Bull.) Pers. (1801)
- Scleroderma xanthochroum Watling & K.P.Sims (2004) – Malaysia
- Scleroderma yunnanense Y.Wang (2013) – China
- Scleroderma zenkeri Henn.
