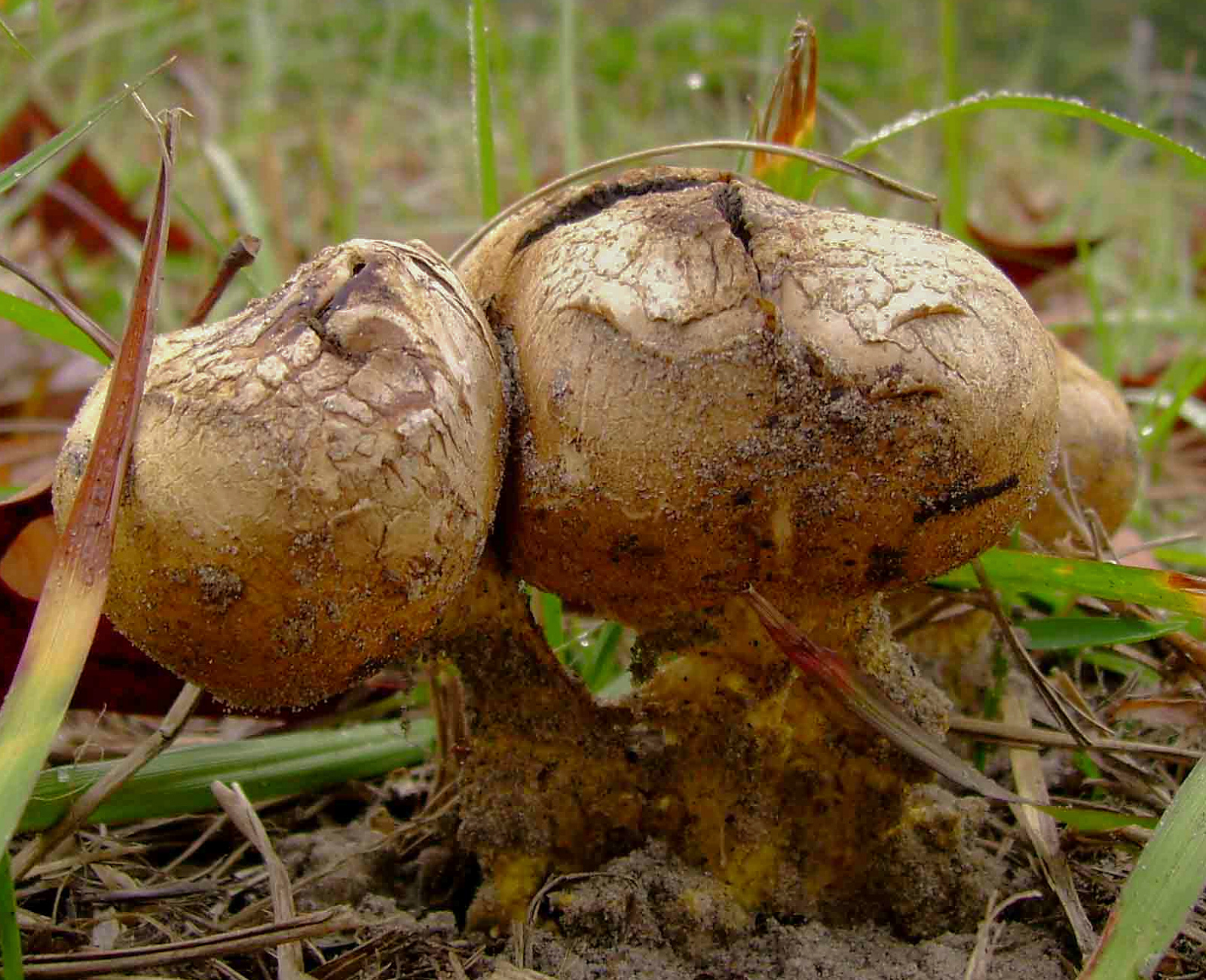

Scientific classification
- Domain: Eukaryota
- Kingdom: Fungi
- Division: Basidiomycota
- Class: Agaricomycetes
- Order: Boletales
- Family: Sclerodermataceae
- Genus: Scleroderma
- Species: S. meridionale

Binomial name
- Scleroderma meridionale Demoulin & Malençon (1971)

= Scleroderma meridionale =

Species of fungus

Scleroderma meridionale is a puffball-like fungus in the family Sclerodermataceae. The fungus produces roughly circular to irregularly shaped fruit bodies up to 6 cm (2.4 in) in diameter, characterised by a thick, yellow to tan peridium that splits into lobes when mature to reveal a dark brownish-grey spore mass inside. It typically grows in sandy, dry soils throughout the Mediterranean basin and parts of North America, where it forms beneficial relationships with various woody plants including pines, oaks and shrubs of the family Cistaceae.

== Taxonomy ==
Scleroderma meridionale was originally described in 1970 by Vincent Demoulin and Georges Jean Louis Malençon, from collections made in Portugal.

== Description ==
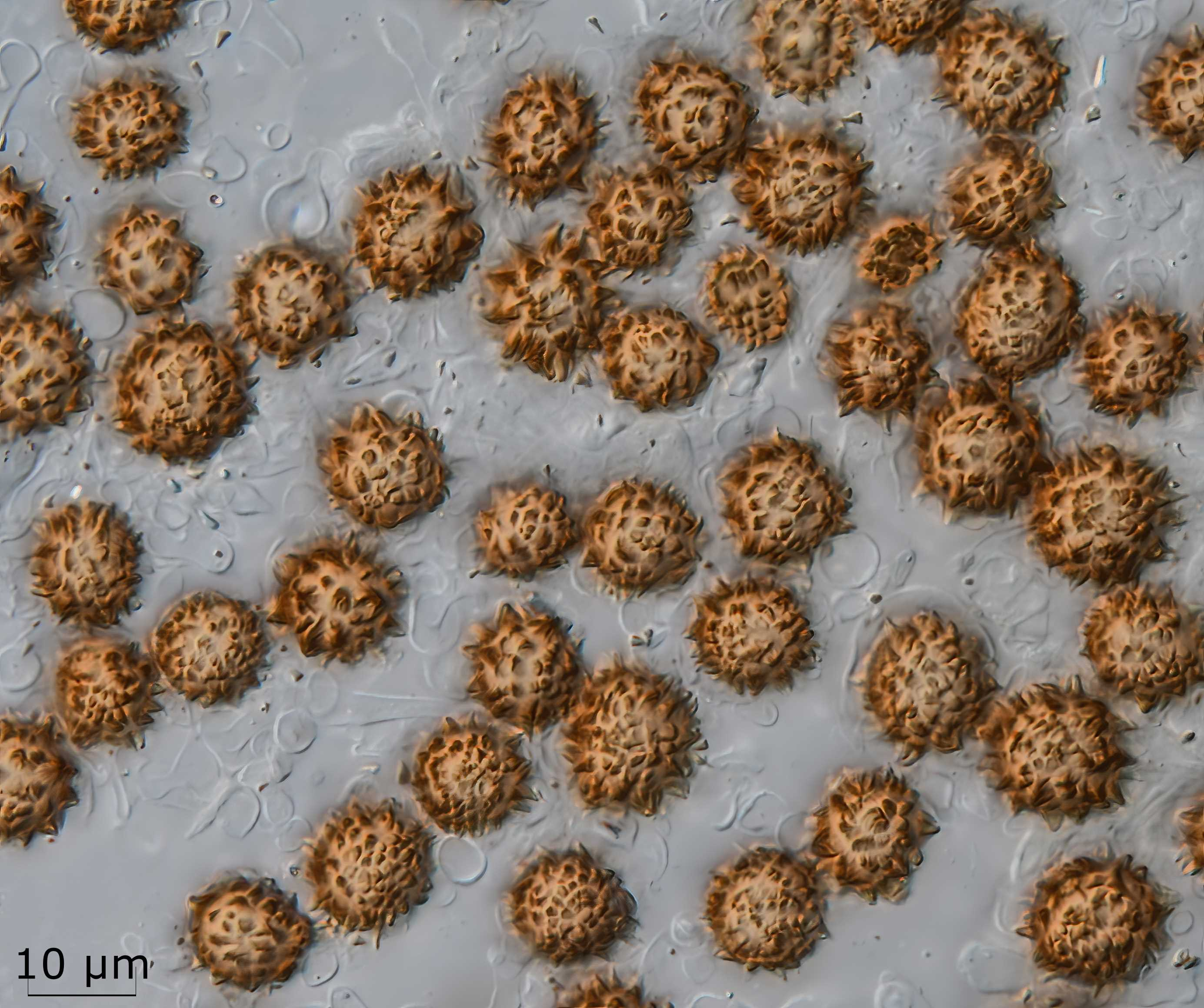
Scleroderma meridionale spores 1000x in KOH

The fungus has a roughly circular to irregularly shaped fruit body up to 6 cm (2.4 in) in diameter with a thick, rooting base. The peridium is up to 2 mm thick and has a dry, roughened surface coloured tan to yellow. Mature fruit bodies tend to split into irregular lobes, revealing a dark brownish- to blackish-grey spore mass (gleba). The dry peridium is often an intense sulphur yellow with a felty to finely furfuraceous (scaly) texture, and may show silver-grey patches where the mantle weathers.

The spores are spherical with small spikes and measure 12–20 μm. Scleroderma meridionale grows in sandy areas, where it fruits singly or scattered in a partially buried state. Its edibility is unknown.

== Habitat, distribution and ecology ==
Scleroderma meridionale typically inhabits sandy, dry soils in coastal and inland Mediterranean basin environments, including coastal dunes, open maquis and pine woodlands. The fruit bodies are roughly spherical, with a stalk-like extension (pseudostipe) often buried deep in the substrate, reflecting adaptation to xeric, nutrient-poor conditions. Although originally described from southern Portugal, continental France, Corsica and Morocco, it is now recorded throughout the Mediterranean basin—including Greece, North Macedonia and Turkey—with isolated reports from North America (Florida to Arizona) pending molecular confirmation.

The species forms ectomycorrhizal systems with a diverse array of woody hosts, spanning both coniferous genera such as Pinus and deciduous oaks (Quercus) as well as shrubs in the family Cistaceae, including Cistus salviifolius and Halimium halimifolium. Ectomycorrhizae on Cistaceae are typically small and coralloid, mirroring the fine-root morphology of their hosts. This generalist symbiotic strategy, characterised by little host specificity, may have facilitated the wide geographic distribution and ecological success of the taxon across varied Mediterranean habitats.

As an ectomycorrhizal fungus, S. meridionale contributes to host plant water and nutrient uptake in drought-prone, disturbance-affected ecosystems. Its capacity to colonise nutrient-poor and fire-impacted soils underlines its ecological plasticity and suggests potential utility in restoration and reforestation of degraded Mediterranean landscapes.

== See also ==
- List of Scleroderma species
