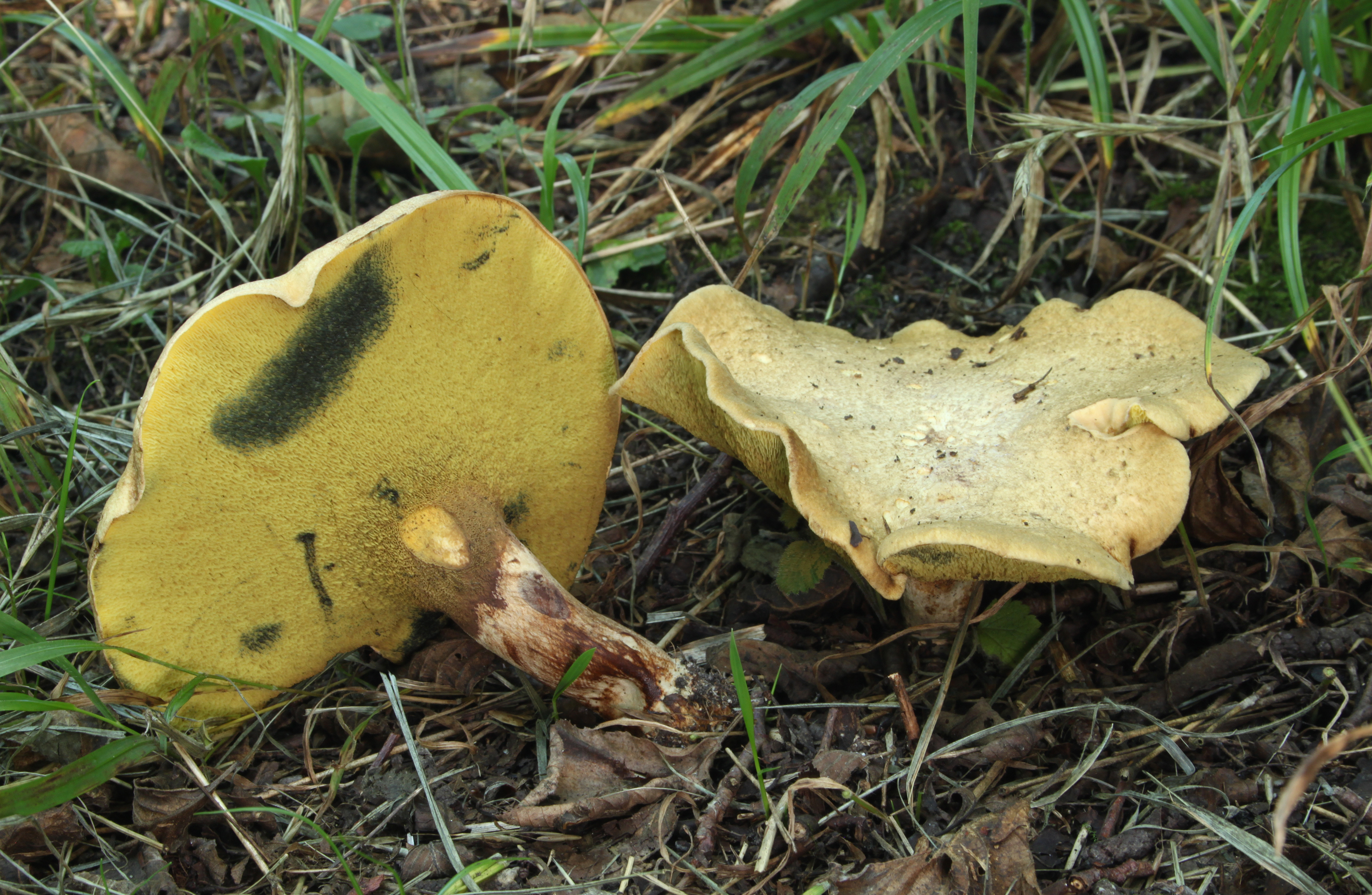
- Gyrodon lividus

Scientific classification
- Domain: Eukaryota
- Kingdom: Fungi
- Division: Basidiomycota
- Class: Agaricomycetes
- Order: Boletales
- Family: Paxillaceae
- Genus: Gyrodon
- Species: G. lividus

Binomial name
- Gyrodon lividus (Bull.) Sacc. (1888)

Synonyms
- Boletus lividus Bull. (1791); Boletus sistotrema Fr. (1815); Boletus sistotremoides Fr. (1815); Boletus chrysenteron var. lividus (Bull.) Mérat (1821); Boletus brachyporus Pers. (1825); Gyrodon sistotremoides (Fr.) Opat. (1836); Boletus rubescens Trog (1839); Boletus lividus var. alneti Lindgr. (1874); Uloporus lividus (Bull.) Quél. (1886)

= Gyrodon lividus =

Species of fungus

Gyrodon lividus Mycological characteristics
- Pores on hymenium
- Cap is flat
- Hymenium is decurrent
- Stipe is bare
- Spore print is olive to brown
- Ecology is mycorrhizal
- Edibility is edible

Gyrodon lividus, commonly known as the alder bolete, is a pored mushroom bearing close affinity to the genus Paxillus. Although found predominantly in Europe, where it grows in a mycorrhizal association with alder, it has also recorded from China, Japan and California. Fruit bodies are distinguished from other boletes by decurrent bright yellow pores that turn blue-grey on bruising. G. lividus mushrooms are edible.

== Taxonomy ==
The alder bolete was initially described by French mycologist Pierre Bulliard in 1791 as Boletus lividus, before being given its current binomial name in 1888 by Pier Andrea Saccardo when he transferred it to Gyrodon. When Saccardo circumscribed Gyroporus, he included Boletus sistotremoides (published by Elias Fries in 1815) as the type species. Rolf Singer later determined that Fries's taxon was the same species as Gyroporus lividus. Before this, in 1886 Lucien Quélet erected the genus Uliporus with Boletus lividus as the type. As a result of Singer's discovery, the genus Uliporus was rendered obsolete, and Boletus sistrotremoides became synonymous with Gyropus lividus. The generic term Gyrodon is derived from the Ancient Greek gyros "whorl" and odon "tooth", while the specific epithet lividus is Latin for "lead-coloured". The fungus is commonly known as the alder bolete.

Molecular research confirms the relations of the genus Gyrodon and the gilled genus Paxillus as sister taxa, and one of the earliest diverging lineages of the suborder Boletineae.

Two subspecies of G. lividus have been described: subsp. alneti, published by Sven Johan Lindgren in 1874, and subsp. labyrinthicus, published by Saccardo in 1888. Neither are considered to have independent taxonomic significance.

== Description ==
Gyrodon lividus has a pale brown, buff or ochre cap 4–10 cm (1.5–4 in) in diameter which is convex and later flat in shape, and can be sticky when wet. Like other boletes, it has pores instead of gills that make up the hymenophore on the underside of the cap. These large pores are decurrent in their attachment to the stipe. Bright yellow, they turn blue-grey when cut or bruised. The thin flesh is pale yellow. The ringless stipe is initially the same colour as the cap but later darkens to a red-brown; it is 3–7 cm (1–3 in) high by 1–2 cm (0.5–1 in) wide. The spore print is olive-brown and the oval spores are 4.5–6 x 3–4 μm. The mushroom has a non-distinctive smell and taste.

In the United States, Gyrodon lividus could be mistaken for Boletinellus merulioides, which is generally a larger mushroom overall with larger spores and grows under ash (Fraxinus), or B. proximus, a dark brown or purple-brown capped species that does not change colour when bruised and is found only in Florida.

== Distribution and habitat ==
Gyrodon lividus is found across Europe, including Ķemeri National Park in Latvia, In Asia, it has been recorded in China and Japan. It is also found in several locales in Turkey, including Trabzon, Maçka and Sevinç. In North America, it has been reported to occur in California, under alder (Alnus rhombifolia).

As its common name suggests, Gyrodon lividus is found under alder (Alnus rhombifolia), with which it forms a mycorrhizal relationship. Fruit bodies may be found alone or in clumps and appear in autumn. The ectomycorrhiza of the fungus is characterized by its yellow colour in young specimens, rhizomorphs that are highly differentiated, and the presence of sclerotia.

== Edibility ==
It is reported as edible by some authors, and inedible by others.

== Bioactive compounds ==
Fruit bodies of Gyrodon lividus contain the cyclopentanedione compounds chamonixin and involution.

== See also ==
- List of North American boletes
