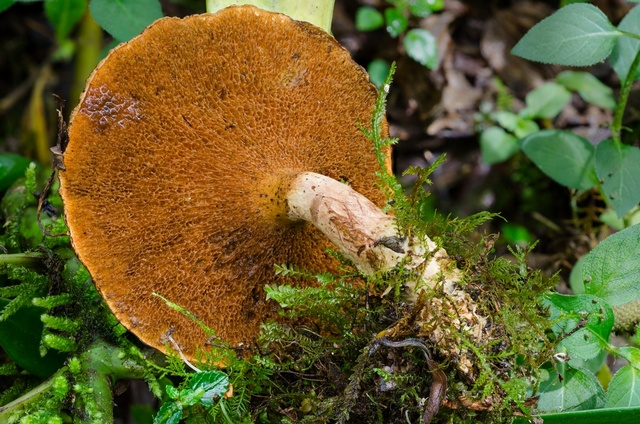

Scientific classification
- Kingdom: Fungi
- Division: Basidiomycota
- Class: Agaricomycetes
- Order: Boletales
- Family: Boletinellaceae
- Genus: Boletinellus
- Species: B. monticola

Binomial name
- Boletinellus monticola (Singer) Watling

Synonyms
- Gyrodon monticola

= Boletinellus monticola =

Boletinellus monticola
- Mycological characteristics
- Pores on hymenium
- Cap is flat
- Hymenium is decurrent
- Stipe is bare
- Spore print is yellow
- Ecology is mycorrhizal
- Edibility is unknown

Boletinellus monticola, previously known as Gyrodon monticola, is a bolete fungus in the Boletinellaceae family with a pored hymenium rather than gills. This species can be identified by its common ectomycorrhizal association and therefore close proximity to Alder trees (Alnus acuminata). B. monticola is most commonly found near the equator, specifically in Southern Mexico and stretching into northern South America.

== Taxonomy ==
Originally, B. monticola was associated with the Gryodon genus by Rolf Singer in 1957. However, it was reassigned to the Boletinellus genus due to its closer genetic relation. This reassignment was reinforced by R. Watling in 1997 who analyzed the description of Rolf Singer's observations in Argentina and concluded it to be related closer to the Boletinellus genus. This change in taxonomy also included the change of Gyrodon exiguus and Gyrodon rompelii to the Boletinellus genus as well.

== Description ==
Boletinellus monticola has a yellow-brown cap with a yellow or orange fertile layer. The stalk extends a few centimeters from the ground and is commonly brown. The fertile layer is made up of large and yellow pores and tubes. B. monticola is also known to produce brown sclerotia in soil providing the ability for the fungus to survive under extreme environmental conditions. The flesh of the bolete is soft and often moist or even wet due to its favored climate of warm tropical areas. This species also produces highly differentiated rhizomorphs with brown dolipore hyphae. B. monticola bruises blue then fades to reddish brown then to dark brown.

== Edibility ==
Boletinellus monticola is considered to be likely edible, however there is no record of it being eaten. Boletes are known to be edible and are reasonably safe for human consumption. Some closely related species such as B. merulioides have been known to taste “acidic and unpleasant”, while offering very little nutritional value.

== Habitat and distribution ==
This species is a terrestrial fungi which grows in top-soil. B. monticola is grown in warm tropical climates and in high elevations ranging from 1000 m - 3,800 m above sea level. Due to its ectomycorrhizal association with Alder trees (Alnus acuminata) the fungus is restricted to the range of where these trees grow. Since most Alder trees grow north of the equator and B. monticola is only found in warm tropical climates, the fungus is generally rare due to this small geographical region. More specifically, Alnus acuminata is found in the highlands of Mexico to the Andes mountains. In North America, the fungus can be found in Southern Mexico. Stretching into South America, B. monticola has been found in Argentina, Bolivia, Colombia, Costa Rica, and Ecuador.

== Ectomycorrhizae ==
Most of the species in the Boletinellus genus are ectomycorrhizal and B. monticola is no exception. This species is known to have an ectomycorrhizal relationship with Alder trees (Alnus acuminata). According to a study by Pablo Alvarado in 2021 this relationship could have evolved independently from a common ancestor of the Paxillaceae family nearly 98 million years ago. Using sulpho-vanillin the root and Hartig net stain reddish, bleach with NH4OH and lactic acid, while no reaction occurs when exposed to 15% KOH, Melzer's reagent and 70% ethanol. As a result of ITS PCR/RFLP analysis, B. monticola is identified molecularly and morphologically as a symbiont of A. acuminata in native Argentinean forests.

== Genome ==
Using Internal Transcribed Spacer (ITS), Alejandra Becerra et al. in 2003 identified 895 base pairs in the genome. The genome of B. monticola is what allowed for the reassignment of the species from genus Gyrodon to Boletinellus. The work done by the University of California at Berkeley using PCR (Polymerase Chain Reaction) found the sequences of primers and other codons for specific genes didn't align with other species in the Gyrodon genus. This study found the first atp6 (mitochondrial locus) and cox3 sequences in the order Boletales allowing for the comparison of certain genes changing the distribution of various families under the order. Despite the family Boletinellaceae is in the order Boletales, evidence suggests that the family is more closely related to the order Sclerodermataceae, however there appears to be some species exceptions.
