= Gigasperma =

Scientific classification
- Kingdom: Fungi
- Division: Basidiomycota
- Class: Agaricomycetes
- Order: Agaricales
- Family: Gigaspermataceae Jülich (1981)
- Genus: Gigasperma E.Horak (1971)

Type species
- Gigasperma clelandii (Rodway) E.Horak (1971)

Synonyms
- Gigaspermaceae Jülich (1981)

Genus of fungi

Gigasperma is an inactive genus of fungi in the order Agaricales with a single species. It was treated either as the only genus in the monotypic family Gigaspermataceae, or part of the wider Cortinariaceae. Gigasperma was circumscribed by Austrian mycologist Egon Horak in 1971.

== Taxonomy ==
No species remain within this genus since Gigasperma cryptica was reclassified as Thaxterogaster crypticus in 2022.

== Synonyms ==
- Gigasperma americanum Kropp & L.J. Hutchison, 1996 = Cryptolepiota americana (Kropp & L.J. Hutchison) Kropp & Trappe, 2012
- Gigasperma clelandii (Rodway) E. Horak, 1971 = Horakiella clelandii (Rodway) Castellano & Trappe, 1992

== See also ==
- List of Agaricales families
- List of Agaricales genera
