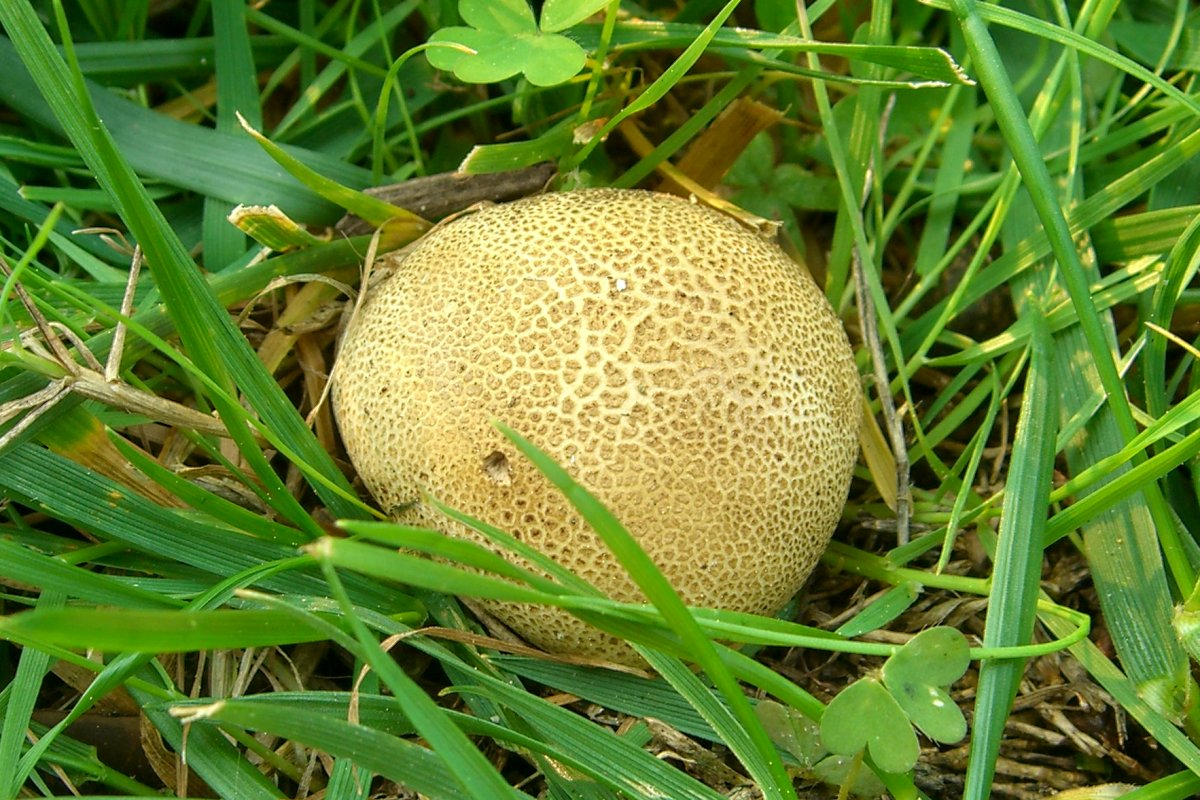

Scientific classification
- Domain: Eukaryota
- Kingdom: Fungi
- Division: Basidiomycota
- Class: Agaricomycetes
- Order: Boletales
- Family: Sclerodermataceae
- Genus: Scleroderma
- Species: S. areolatum

Binomial name
- Scleroderma areolatum Ehrenb.

= Scleroderma areolatum =

Scleroderma areolatum Mycological characteristics
- Glebal hymenium
- No distinct cap
- Hymenium attachment is not applicable
- Lacks a stipe
- Spore print is purple-black to olive
- Ecology is mycorrhizal
- Edibility is poisonous

Scleroderma areolatum is a basidiomycete fungus and a member of the genus Scleroderma, or "earth balls".

== Description ==
They are usually 1–5 centimetres (3/8–2 in) in diameter, and grow individually or in small groups.

Like most members of Scleroderma, S. areolatum resembles but is only distantly related to the giant puffball. It can be distinguished from the giant puffball by cutting it in half; the puffball will have a solid, denser middle, with no signs of a developing cap mushroom.

== Habitat ==
They are commonly found in deciduous forests, in neutral soil.

== Toxicity ==
They are poisonous, and ingestion can lead to vomiting, diarrhea, and in larger quantities, fainting.
