= Scleroderma bermudense =

Scientific classification
- Kingdom: Fungi
- Division: Basidiomycota
- Class: Agaricomycetes
- Order: Boletales
- Family: Sclerodermataceae
- Genus: Scleroderma
- Species: S. bermudense

Binomial name
- Scleroderma bermudense Coker (1939)

Mycorrhizal fungus

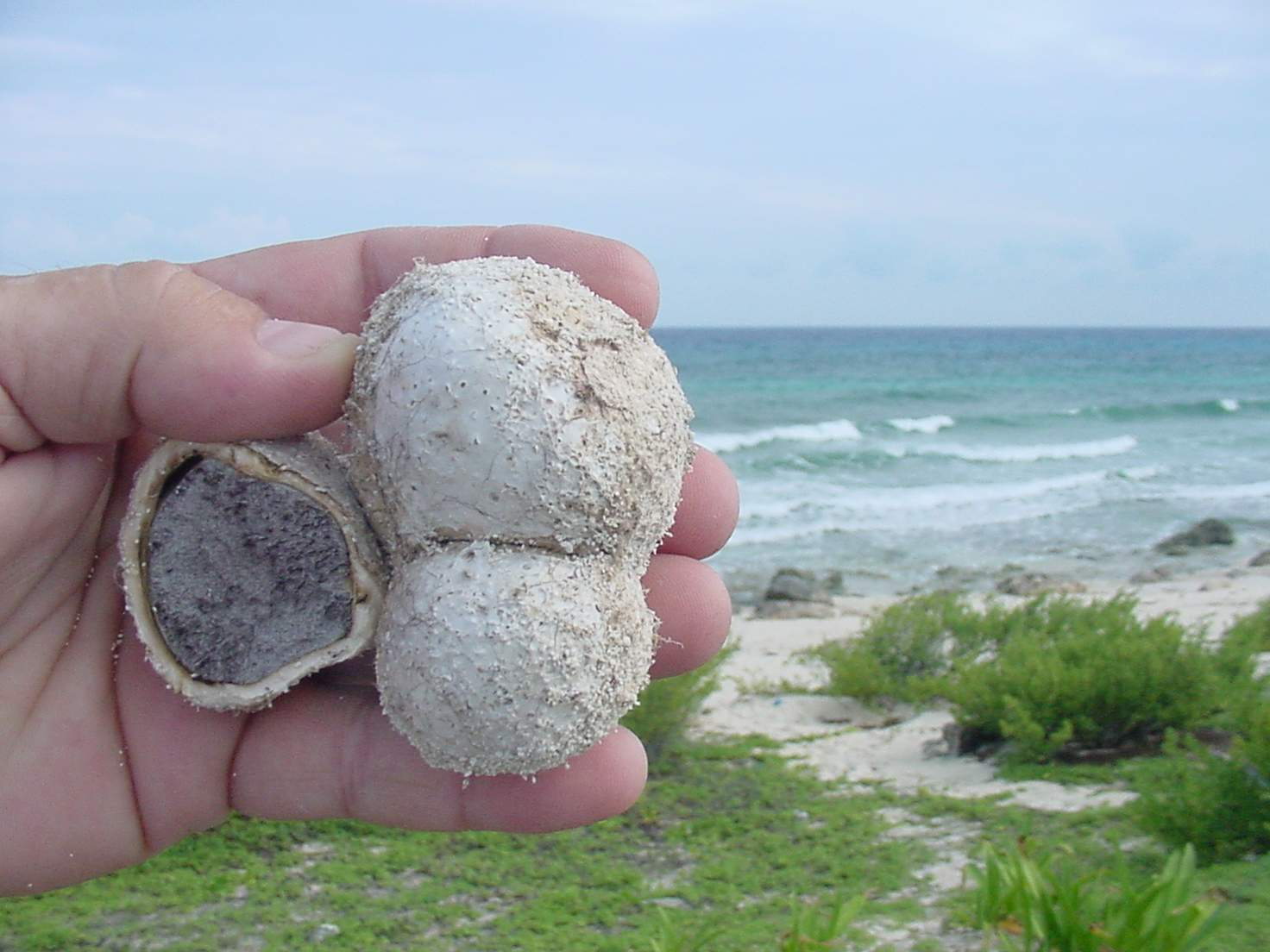
Scleroderma bermudense in Cozumel, Quintana Roo, Mexico (2002)

Scleroderma bermudense is a species of Basidiomycete fungi in the family Sclerodermataceae. The species was first described by American botanist and mycologist, William Chambers Coker, in 1939.

== Range ==
The species is indigenous to Bermuda, the Bahamas, Barbados, the Virgin Islands, Cuba, the Dominican Republic, Puerto Rico; The US state of Florida; and the Mexican states of Guerrero, Acapulco, Quintana Roo, Veracruz, and Yucatan. It has been introduced accidentally along with its host tree in various tropical regions, including French Guiana, Senegal, and Réunion.

== Habitat ==
Scleroderma bermudense is limited to the dune ecosystem of sandy beaches beneath its mycorrhizal host.

== Ecology ==
Scleroderma bermudense is a mycorrhizal fungus associated with the seagrape Coccoloba uvifera. It has been found to alleviate salt uptake in seagrape seedlings, thus facilitating the tree's ability to live on coastal beaches.

== Etymology ==
The genus name comes from Greek sclero, meaning hard, and derma, meaning skin, and is the same as the name of a skin disease also characterized by hardened skin. The specific epithet bermudense refers to the type locality, Bermuda. This species does not have a common name in English.

== Taxonomy ==
This species has previously been considered a synonym of Scleroderma stellatum, found in Brazil, but S. stellatum differs in having an echinulate peridium, which S. bermudensis lacks.

== Conservation status ==
Scleroderma bermudense has been proposed for Endangered status under criteria A3c because its habitat is subject to sea level rise.
