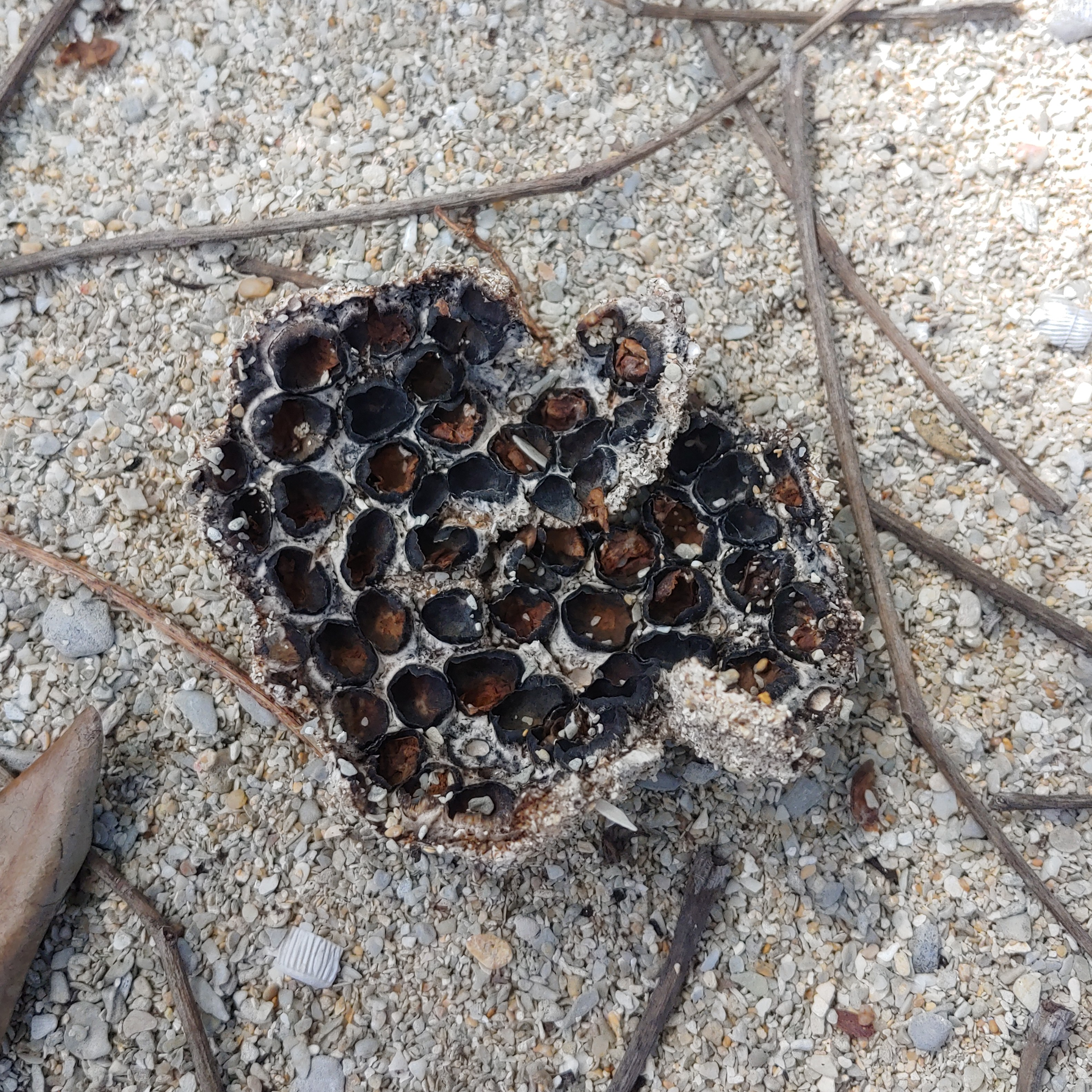
- Diplocystis wrightii

Scientific classification
- Domain: Eukaryota
- Kingdom: Fungi
- Division: Basidiomycota
- Class: Agaricomycetes
- Order: Boletales
- Family: Diplocystaceae
- Genus: Diplocystis; Berk. & M.A.Curtis (1869)

Type species
- Diplocystis wrightii Berk. & M.A.Curtis (1869)

= Diplocystis =

Genus of fungi

Diplocystis is a genus of fungi in the Diplocystaceae family. The single species in the genus, Diplocystis wrightii, has been shown using phylogenetic analysis to be a member of the Sclerodermatineae suborder of the Boletales. The species was originally described in 1869 by Miles Joseph Berkeley and Moses Ashley Curtis, from specimens collected in the Caribbean.
