= Boletinellus proximus =

Scientific classification
- Domain: Eukaryota
- Kingdom: Fungi
- Division: Basidiomycota
- Class: Agaricomycetes
- Order: Boletales
- Family: Boletinellaceae
- Genus: Boletinellus
- Species: B. proximus

Binomial name
- Boletinellus proximus (Singer) Murrill (1946)

Synonyms
- Gyrodon proximus Singer (1945)

Species of fungus

Boletinellus proximus is a species of bolete fungus in the family Boletinellaceae. It is found in Florida, where it grows on the ground or rotten wood in moist habitats.
