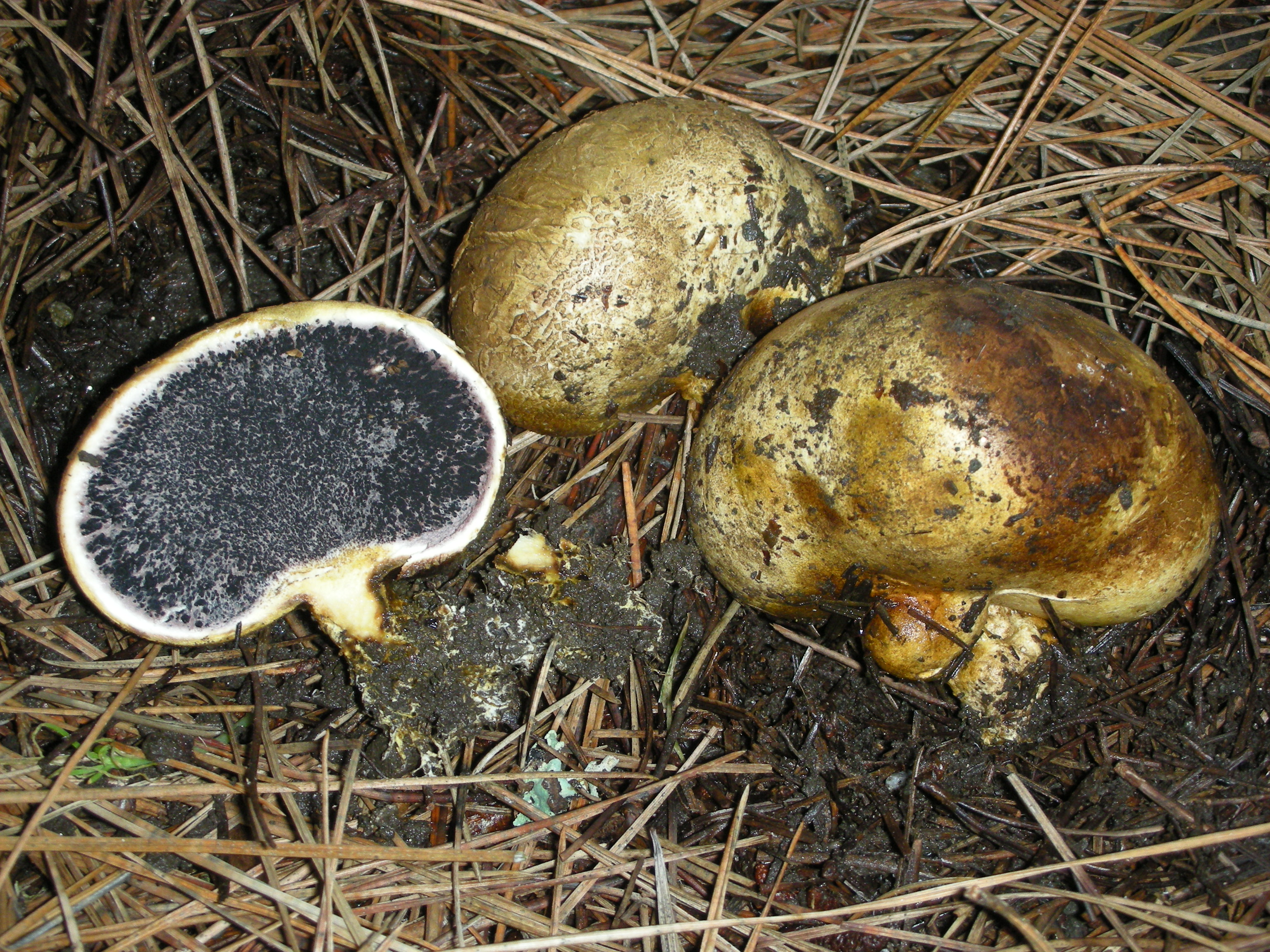

Scientific classification
- Kingdom: Fungi
- Division: Basidiomycota
- Class: Agaricomycetes
- Order: Boletales
- Family: Sclerodermataceae
- Genus: Scleroderma
- Species: S. cepa

Binomial name
- Scleroderma cepa Pers. (1801)

= Scleroderma cepa =

Species of fungus

Scleroderma cepa
- Mycological characteristics
- Glebal hymenium
- No distinct cap
- Hymenium attachment is irregular or not applicable
- Lacks a stipe
- Spore print is white to purple-black
- Ecology is mycorrhizal
- Edibility is poisonous

Scleroderma cepa, commonly known as the smooth earthball or onion earthball, is a species of gasteroid fungus up to 6 centimetres (2 1/4 in) in width. It has a worldwide distribution and is poisonous.

== Description ==
The fruiting body is gasteroid, meaning that the spores are formed and mature internally. The fruiting body consists of spore-bearing substance called gleba surrounded by a protective layer known as the peridium. The fruiting body can be found fully buried, above-ground (epigeous), or partially exposed. It is rounded or irregularly lobed, often flattened, and is 1.5 to 6 centimetres (1/2 to 2 1/4 in) wide. The base is sometimes pinched or folded.

S. cepa is attached to the ground by a clump of mycelium. It has no stipe, but occasionally the mycelium clump aggregates into a pseudostipe.

The peridium is tough and up to 1.5 mm thick. The surface is dry and can have tiny scales or be smooth. With age, the peridium becomes finely cracked or areolate, especially on the top surface. S. cepa appears white when young and turns to pale brown or yellowish brown over time. It bruises vinaceous or darker brown where it has been rubbed or handled. At maturity, the peridium splits open, releasing the spores.

The gleba is firm and whitish when young, remaining firm and turning purple-black with interspersed white mycelia over time. At maturity, the gleba becomes powdery and dull brown.

=== Microscopic features ===
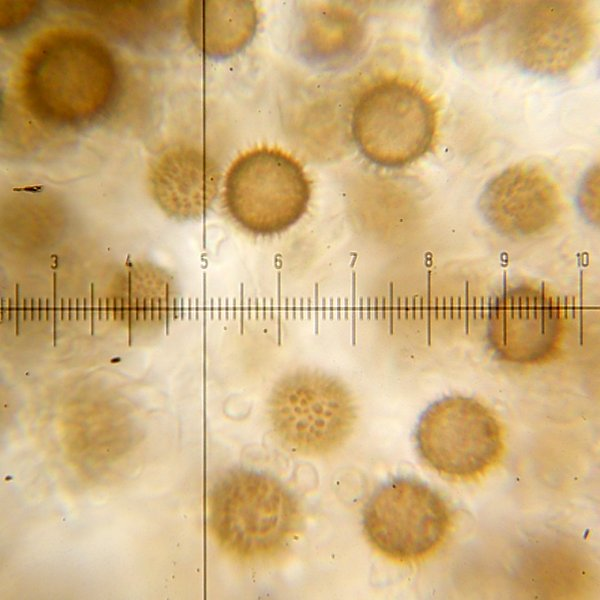
S. cepa spores, 1000x magnification

The spores are near-spherical and measure 7–12.5 μm. The spore surface is brownish, has no reticulation, and is covered with spines up to 2 μm.

=== Similar species ===
The species looks similar to some other earthballs in Scleroderma, especially S. citrinum (the common earthball). S. citrinum has raised warts and reticulate spores, in contrast to S. cepa's smooth (though often cracked) surface and spiny spores. It may require microscopy to reliably identify species in this group.

It can be differentiated from the various puffballs (i.e. Calvatia, Lycoperdon, etc.) by its thick, tough peridium and firm gleba that is never soft or semi-liquid.

== Habitat and distribution ==
S. cepa can be solitary, scattered, or found in groups. It can occur in sparse grass, woodlands, landscaped areas, or on disturbed ground. It fruits in summer and fall in watered areas or after rain. It is ectomycorrhizal.

It has a worldwide distribution and is especially common in North America, Europe, and Australia. It occurs throughout the United States, but is more abundant in the Eastern US.

== Toxicity ==
The species is poisonous, causing gastrointestinal upset.

== Uses ==
It is used as a soil inoculant in agriculture and horticulture.
