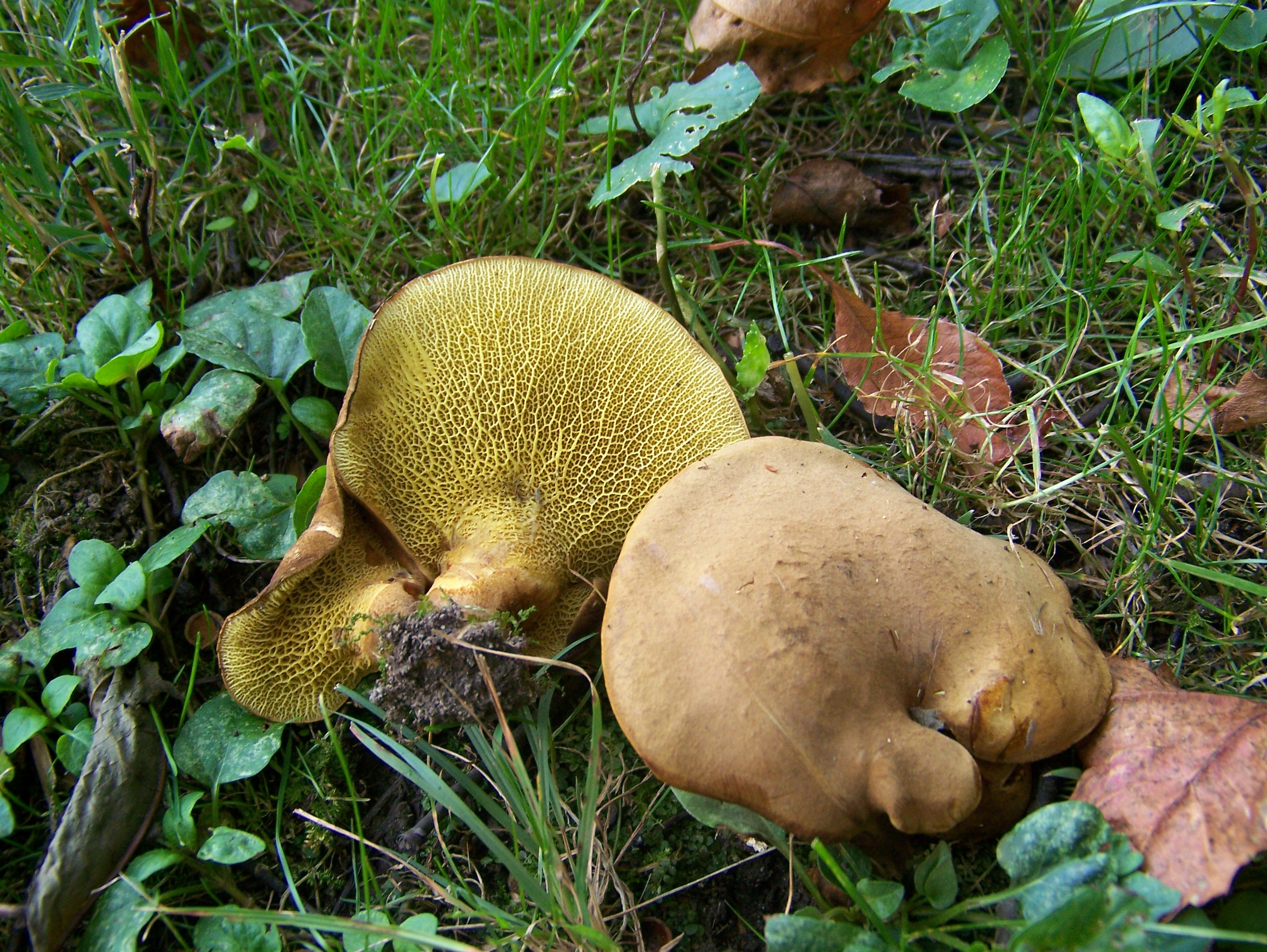
- Boletinellus merulioides

Scientific classification
- Kingdom: Fungi
- Division: Basidiomycota
- Class: Agaricomycetes
- Order: Boletales
- Suborder: Sclerodermatineae
- Family: Boletinellaceae; P.M.Kirk, P.F.Cannon & J.C.David (2001)

Type genus
- Boletinellus Murrill (1909)

Genera
- Boletinellus; Phlebopus

= Boletinellaceae =

Family of fungi

The Boletinellaceae are a small family of mushroom-forming fungi, primarily characterized by small pores on the underside of the cap rather than gills. Though in the order Boletales, research shows they and Gyroporaceae are more closely related to earthballs of Sclerodermataceae than Boletaceae.

Genera include Boletinellus and Phlebopus, the latter genus showing some Gondwanan distribution found in Australia, Sri Lanka and elsewhere. It contains the gigantic Phlebopus marginatus, the cap of which can reach 1 metre in diameter.
