= Favillea =

Scientific classification
- Kingdom: Fungi
- Division: Basidiomycota
- Class: Agaricomycetes
- Order: Boletales
- Family: Sclerodermataceae
- Genus: Favillea; Fr.

Type species
- Favillea argillacea Fr.

Species
- F. argillacea F. degenerans

Genus of fungi

Favillea is a genus of fungi within the Sclerodermataceae family.
