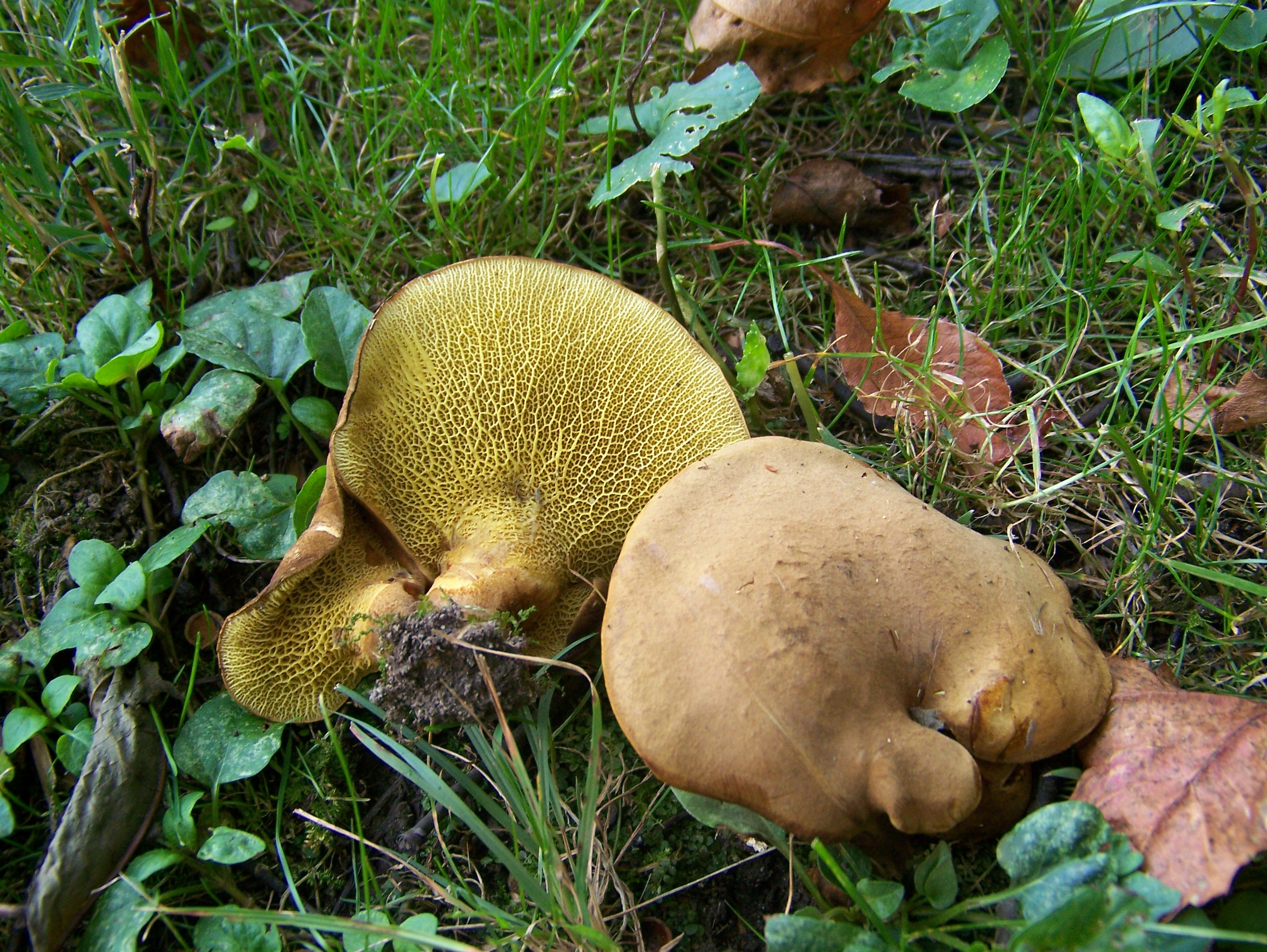
- Boletinellus merulioides

Scientific classification
- Kingdom: Fungi
- Division: Basidiomycota
- Class: Agaricomycetes
- Order: Boletales
- Family: Boletinellaceae
- Genus: Boletinellus; Murrill (1909)

Type species
- Boletinellus merulioides (Schwein.) Murrill (1909)

Species
- B. exiguus B. glandulosus B. intermedius B. merulioides B. monticola B. proximus B. purpureus B. rompelii

= Boletinellus =

Genus of fungi

Boletinellus is a genus of fungi in the family Boletinellaceae (suborder Sclerodermatineae of the Boletales). The genus was first described by American mycologist William Alphonso Murrill in 1909.
