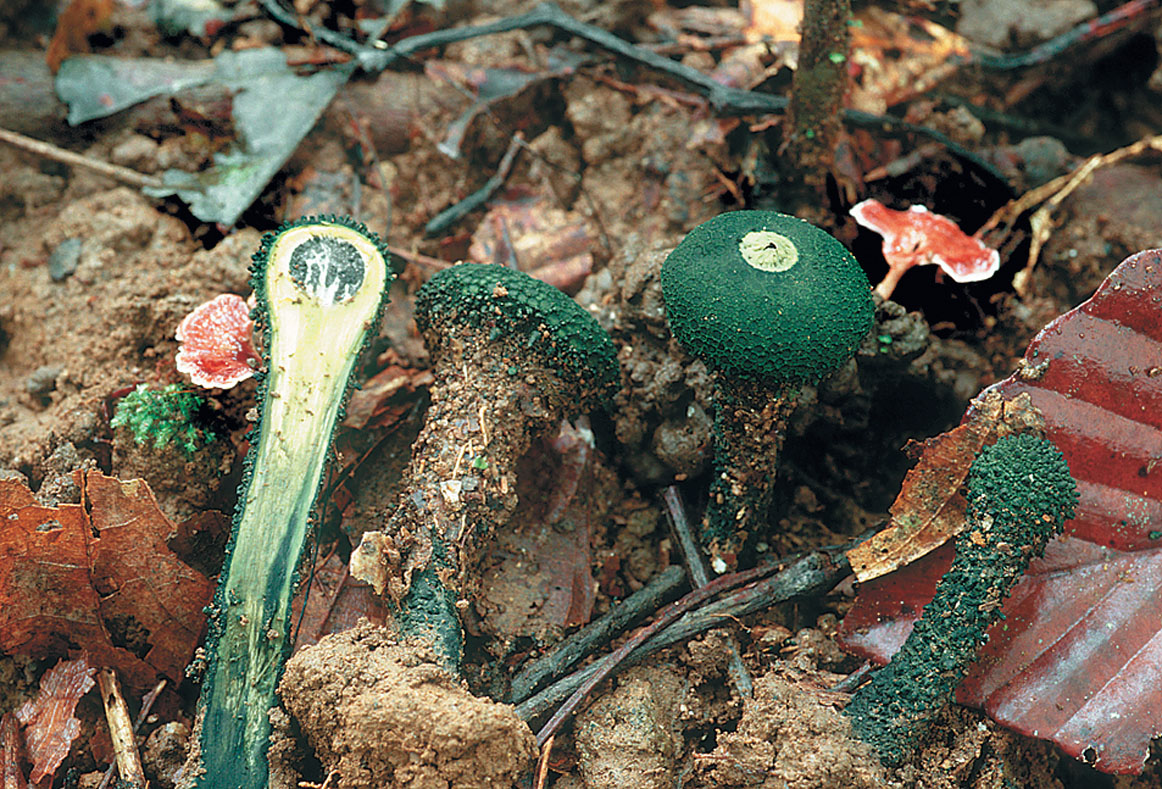
- Species holotype at Danum Valley, Sabah (Borneo), Malaysia.

Conservation status
- Vulnerable (IUCN 3.1)

Scientific classification
- Kingdom: Fungi
- Division: Basidiomycota
- Class: Agaricomycetes
- Order: Boletales
- Family: Sclerodermataceae
- Genus: Chlorogaster; Læssøe & Jalink
- Species: C. dipterocarpi

Binomial name
- Chlorogaster dipterocarpi Læssøe & Jalink

= Chlorogaster =

Genus of fungi

Chlorogaster (literally green stomach) is a genus of fungi thought to belong to the Sclerodermataceae family, but this has been not molecularly confirmed. A monotypic genus, it contains the single mycorrhizal species Chlorogaster dipterocarpi.
