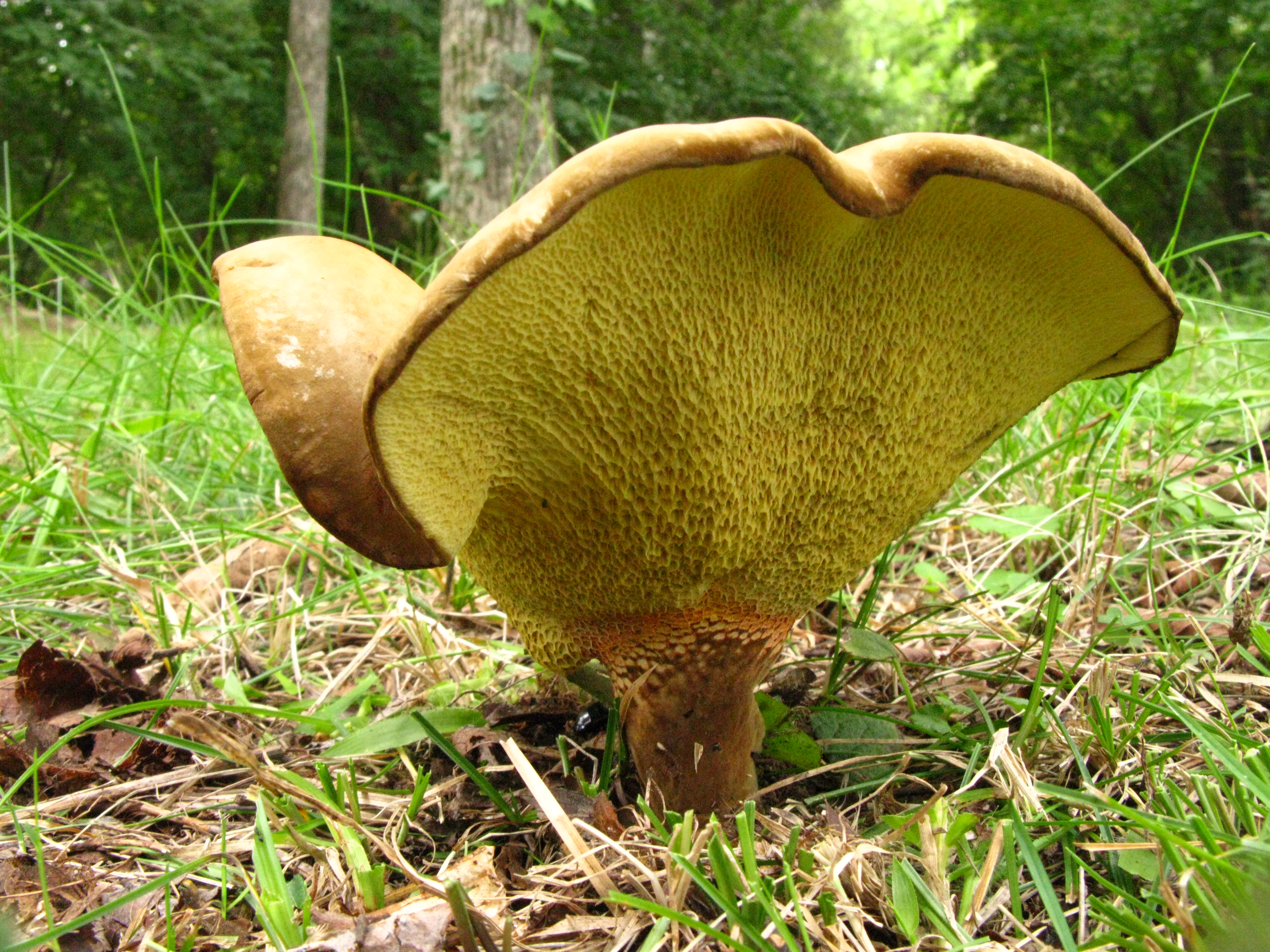

Scientific classification
- Domain: Eukaryota
- Kingdom: Fungi
- Division: Basidiomycota
- Class: Agaricomycetes
- Order: Boletales
- Family: Boletinellaceae
- Genus: Boletinellus
- Species: B. merulioides

Binomial name
- Boletinellus merulioides (Schwein.) Murrill (1909)

Synonyms
- Daedalea merulioides Schwein. (1832); Gyrodon merulioides (Schwein.) Singer (1938); Boletinus merulioides (Schwein.) Coker & Beers (1943); Boletus merulioides (Schwein.) Murrill (1948)

= Boletinellus merulioides =

Species of fungus

Boletinellus merulioides, commonly known as the ash-tree bolete, is a species of bolete fungus in the family Boletinellaceae. Described as new to science in 1832, it is found in Asia and eastern North America, where it grows on the ground near ash trees due to a mutualistic relationship with a species of aphid.

== Taxonomy ==
The species was first described as Daedalea merulioides by Lewis David de Schweinitz in 1832, from collections made in Salem. William Alphonso Murrill transferred the species to the genus Boletinellus in 1909. It is commonly known as the "ash-tree bolete". Rolf Singer classified it in the genus Gyrodon, but it is not closely related to that genus genetically.

== Description ==
The cap is initially convex before becoming flattened to convex in maturity, and attains a diameter of 3.5–12 cm (1 1/2–4 3/4 in). The cap surface is dry to slightly sticky, and smooth or covered with tiny fibrils. Its color ranges from yellow brown to reddish brown, and will bruise dull yellow-brown. The stem is up to 4 cm long, often curved, and tapers from the cap. The flesh is yellow and, when cut, will either have no color reaction or change slowly to blue-green. It has no distinctive odor. The pore surface is pale yellow to dull gold or olive, but will slowly turn blue and then reddish brown as a reaction to injury. The pores are boletinoid, meaning that they have a structure intermediate between gills and pores. They are about 1 mm wide, and the tube layer is 3–6 mm (1/8–1/4 in) deep. The spore print is olive-brown.

Unusual for boletes, it forms abundant sclerotia. These are spherical to roughly elliptical structures measuring 2–3 mm wide, which have a hard, black to dark brown rind and a hollow internal medulla. Occurring singly or in clumps of over 100, they are usually found between the mineral and organic layers of the soil. The sclerotia allow the fungus to survive harsh conditions such as low temperatures, and will rapidly colonize nearby soil when conditions are favorable.

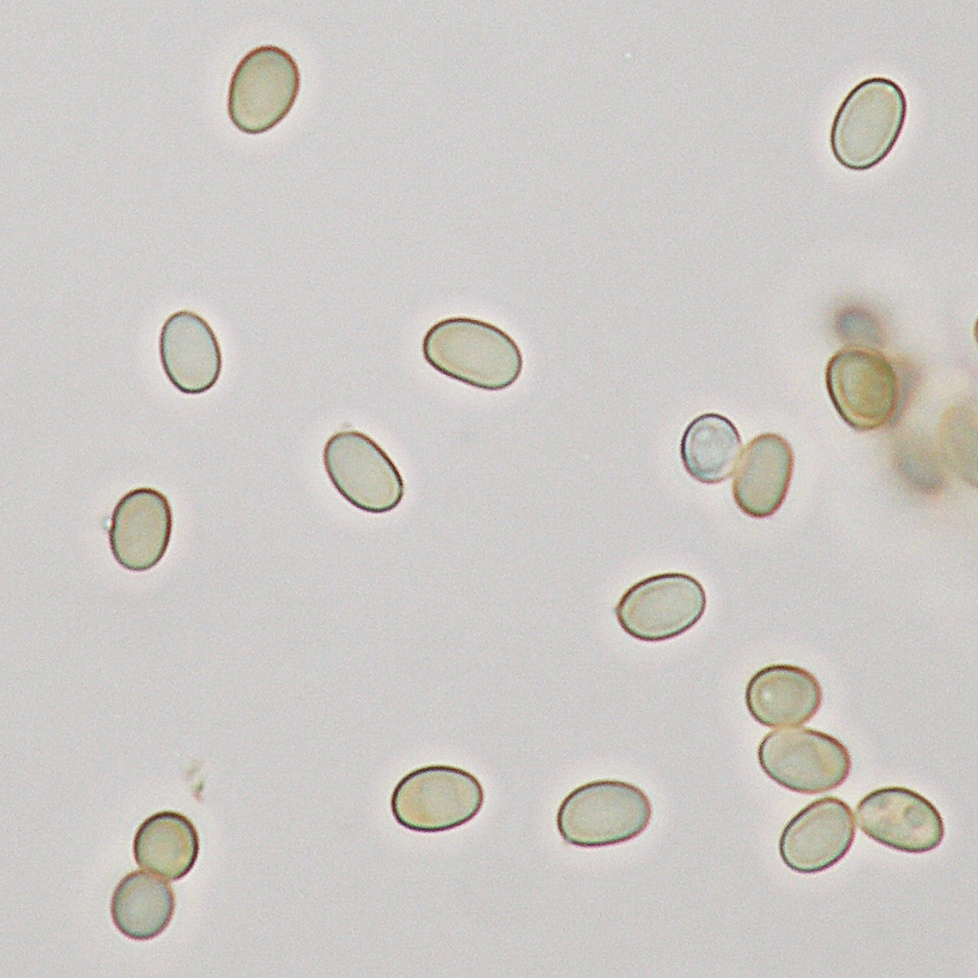
Basidiospores at 40x in bright-field microscopy

== Distribution and habitat ==
The fungus is found in eastern North America, from eastern Canada south to Alabama and west to Wisconsin. It is also found in Mexico. A common species, it fruits in summer and autumn. It has also been reported in Japan.

The fruit bodies grow on the ground scattered or in groups, almost always near ash (Fraxinus spp.), but rarely near maple and white pine.

== Ecology ==
The fungus has a mutualistic relationship with a parasitic aphid that occurs only on ash trees. The aphid feeds on the tree roots, and shelters inside hollow sclerotia formed by the fungus in the soil, or attached to the root system. The aphid secretes carbohydrates and other nutrients that benefit the fungus.

== Uses ==
The fruit bodies are edible but of low quality, with an acidic and unpleasant taste. The mushrooms can be used in mushroom dyeing to produce light brown or dark orangish brown colors, depending on the mordant used.

== See also ==
- List of North American boletes
