= Horakiella =

Scientific classification
- Kingdom: Fungi
- Division: Basidiomycota
- Class: Agaricomycetes
- Order: Boletales
- Family: Sclerodermataceae
- Genus: Horakiella; Castellano & Trappe

Type species
- Horakiella clelandii (Rodway) Castellano & Trappe

Genus of fungi

Horakiella is a genus of fungi within the Sclerodermataceae family that contains the two species H. clelandii and H. watarrkana.

The genus name of Horakiella is in honour of Egon Horak (born 1937), an Austrian mycologist.

The genus was circumscribed in 1992 by Michael A. Castellano and James Martin Trappe in Austral. Syst. Bot., vol.5, on page 641.
