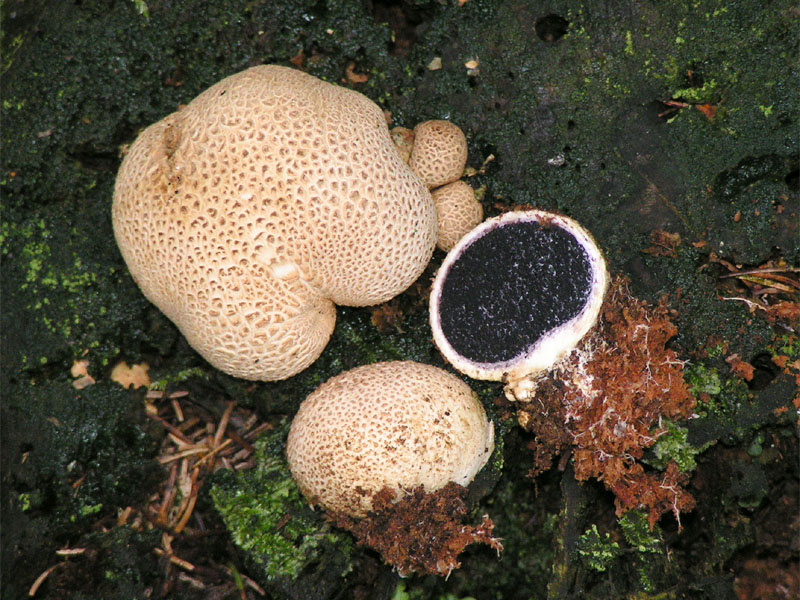

Scientific classification
- Kingdom: Fungi
- Division: Basidiomycota
- Class: Agaricomycetes
- Order: Boletales
- Family: Sclerodermataceae
- Genus: Scleroderma
- Species: S. citrinum

Binomial name
- Scleroderma citrinum Pers.

= Scleroderma citrinum =

Scleroderma citrinum
- Mycological characteristics
- Glebal hymenium
- No distinct cap
- Hymenium attachment is not applicable
- Lacks a stipe
- Spore print is purple-black
- Ecology is mycorrhizal
- Edibility is poisonous

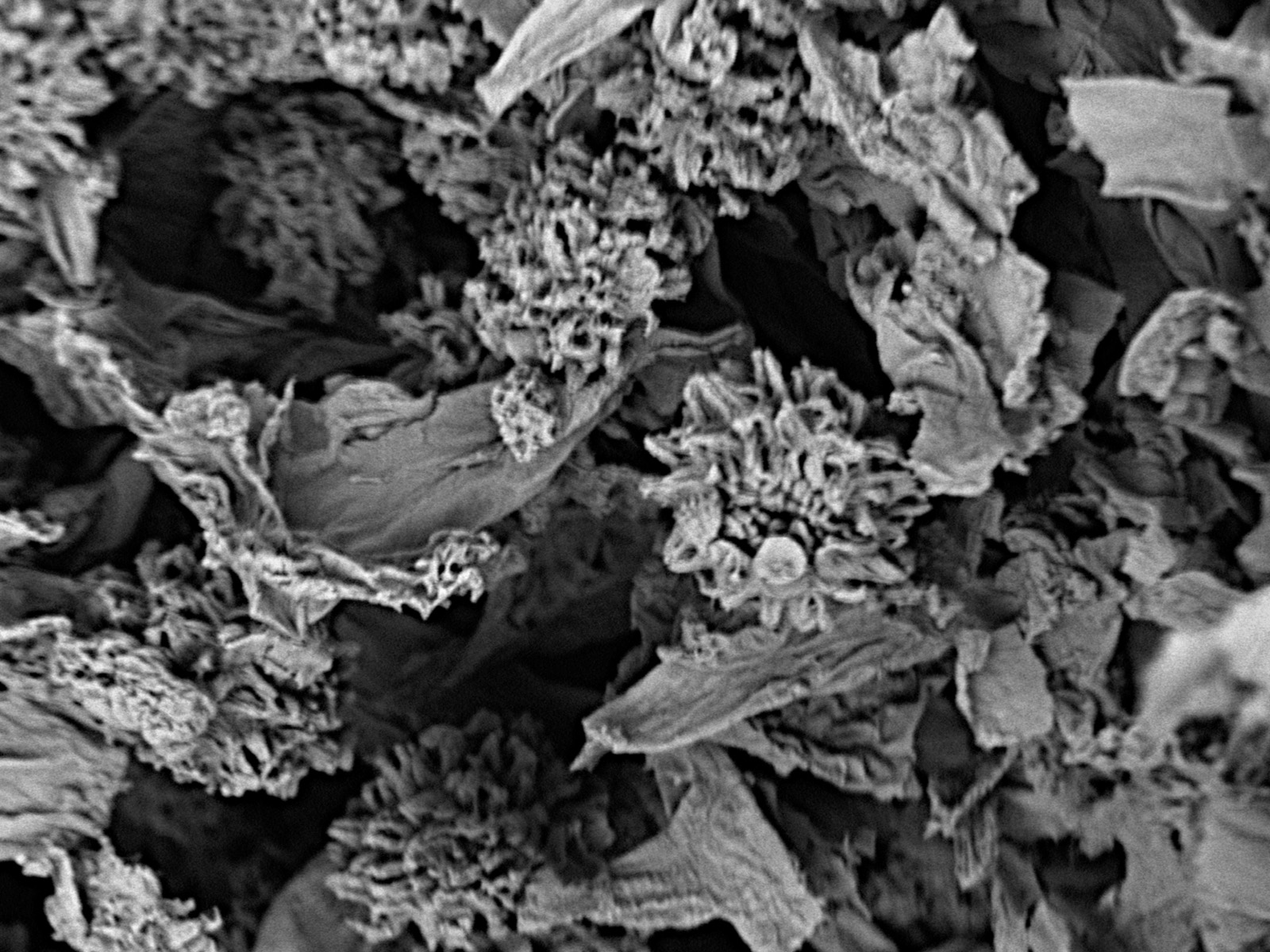
SEM image of a cross section of peridium, gleba region with small spiky spores

Scleroderma citrinum, commonly known as the common earthball, pigskin poison puffball, or common earth ball, is a species of earthball fungus.

== Description ==
The fruit bodies grow to 10 centimetres (4 in) broad and 6 cm high with a yellowish peridium, or outer skin.

Earthballs are superficially similar to, and considered look-alikes of, the edible puffball (particularly Apioperdon pyriforme), but whereas the puffball has a single opening on top through which the spores are dispersed, the earthball just breaks up to release the spores. Moreover, S. citrinum has much firmer flesh and a dark gleba (interior) much earlier in development than puffballs. Scleroderma citrinum has no stem but is attached to the soil by mycelial cords. The peridium is thick and firm, usually ochre yellow externally with irregular warts.

== Distribution and habitat ==
Found in Europe and in North America, it is the most common species of earthball fungus in the United Kingdom and occurs widely in woods, heathland and in short grass from autumn to winter. S. citrinum has two synonyms, S. aurantium (Vaill.) and Scleroderma vulgare Horn.

== Ecology ==
Scleroderma citrinum is an ectomycorrhizal fungus with a symbiotic relationship with tree species, and can influence the diversity of soil bacterial communities under some tree species.

The earthball may be parasitized by Pseudoboletus parasiticus.

== Toxicity ==
Scleroderma citrinum is poisonous and can be mistaken with truffles by inexperienced mushroom hunters. Ingestion of S. citrinum can cause gastrointestinal distress in humans and animals. Some individuals may experience lacrimation, rhinitis and rhinorrhea, and conjunctivitis from exposure to its spores.

Pigments found in the fruiting body of S. citrinum Pers. are sclerocitrin, norbadione A, xerocomic acid, and badione A.
