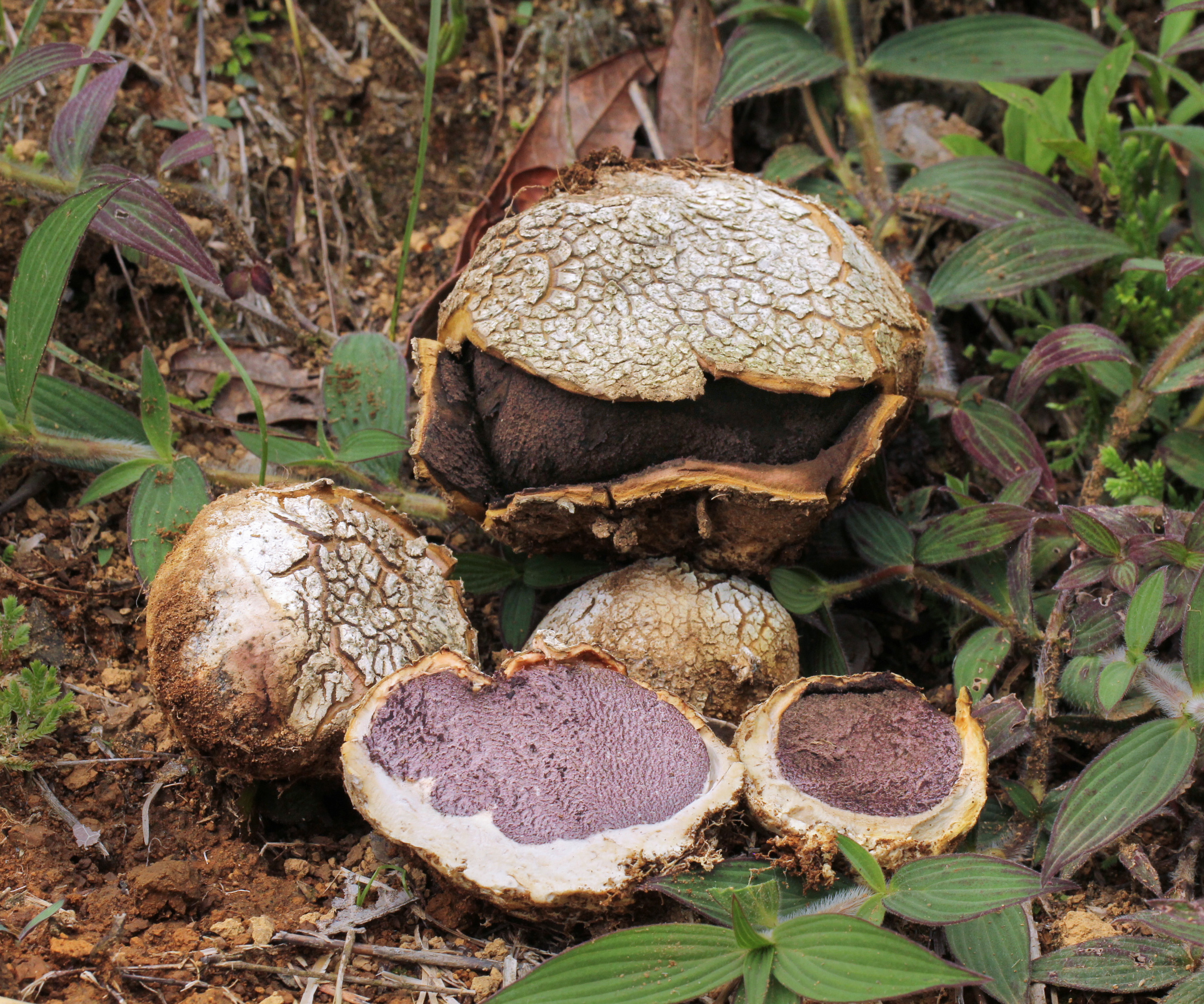
- Scleroderma texense

Scientific classification
- Kingdom: Fungi
- Division: Basidiomycota
- Class: Agaricomycetes
- Order: Boletales
- Family: Sclerodermataceae
- Genus: Scleroderma; Pers.

Type species
- Scleroderma verrucosum (Bull.) Pers. (1801)

= Scleroderma (fungus) =

Genus of fungi

Scleroderma is a genus of fungi, commonly known as earth balls, now known to belong to the Boletales order, in suborder Sclerodermatineae. The best known species are S. citrinum and S. verrucosum. They are found worldwide. Various members of this genus are used as inoculation symbionts to colonize and promote the growth of tree seedlings in nurseries. The majority of species are not edible.

The name comes from the Greek sclera meaning hard and derma meaning skin.

== Description ==
The peridium (outer wall), which may be smooth or warted, is very thick and tough. At maturity it splits irregularly over the upper part of the basidiocarp to reveal the dark gleba underneath. Spores are produced in small brownish-purple, pea-like bodies called peridioles that initially are outlined by wall-like aggregations of white hyphae. These peridioles disintegrate as the fruit body matures, and by the time the peridium splits open, only a powdery mass of dark spores is visible. Spores are roughly spherical in shape with warts or reticulate ornamentation, thick-walled, and brown. Species in Scleroderma are ectomycorrhizal with shrubs and trees, and have a worldwide distribution.

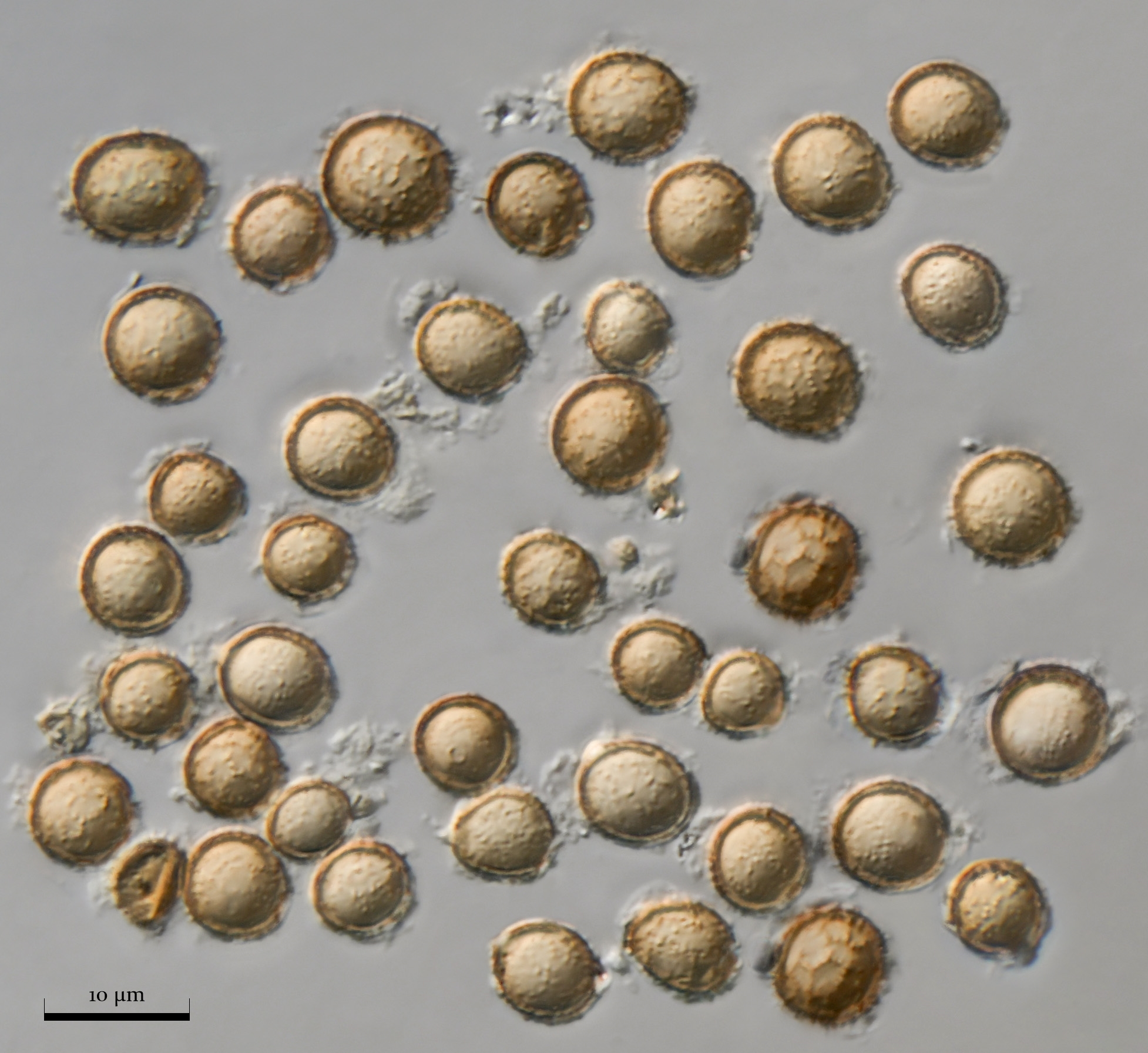
Scleroderma texense spores 1000x

== See also ==
- List of Scleroderma species
