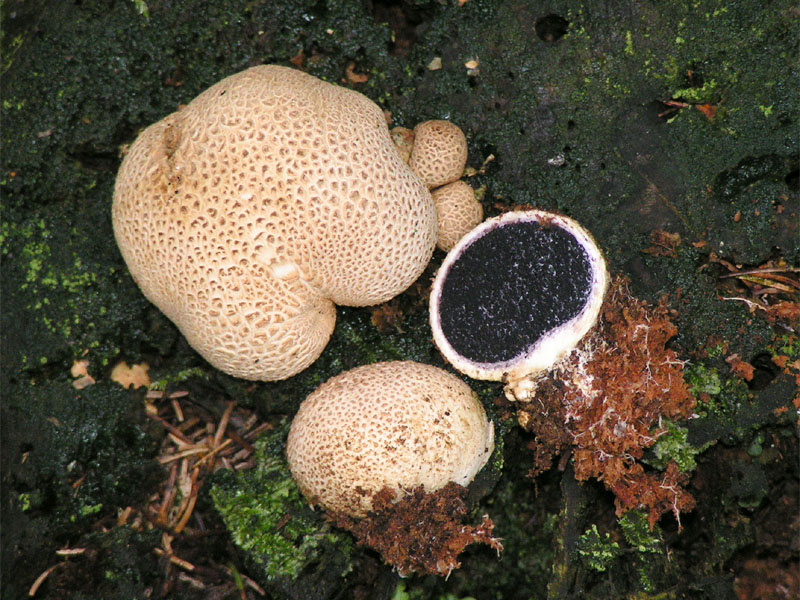
- Scleroderma citrinum

Scientific classification
- Kingdom: Fungi
- Division: Basidiomycota
- Class: Agaricomycetes
- Order: Boletales
- Suborder: Sclerodermatineae
- Family: Sclerodermataceae; Corda (1842)

= Sclerodermataceae =

Family of fungi

The Sclerodermataceae are a family of fungi in the order Boletales, containing several genera of unusual fungi that little resemble boletes. Taxa, which include species commonly known as the ‘hard-skinned puffballs’, ‘earthballs’, or 'earthstars', are widespread in both temperate and tropical regions. The best known members include the earthball Scleroderma citrinum, the dye fungus Pisolithus tinctorius and the 'prettymouths' of the genus Calostoma.

== Description ==
Fruit-bodies are mostly epigenous (above ground), rarely hypogeous (underground), more or less spherical in shape, without a stem or with an irregular root-like stem. The peridium (outer wall) is mostly simple, rarely 2-layered, firm, rarely thin, membranous, breaking open irregularly or in lobes or decaying, revealing the gleba. The gleba typically has sharply defined basidia-bearing sectors, which are partitioned from one another by sterile veins, and in which the basidia are regularly scattered through the tissue. The gleba, which is brown or white in young specimens, turns dark purple to brownish purple in age, and crumbles to a powder of spores and disintegrating tissues at maturity. The basidia are roughly clavate (club-shaped). Spores are brown, roughly spherical in shape, thick-walled, with spines or warts, or with a network-like appearance. Spores are spread by wind, by predators, or are washed into the soil by rainwater.

== Habitat ==
Taxa are found growing on the ground or associated with rotten wood, and are mostly ectomycorrhizal with woody plants.

== Genera ==
- Calostoma - "prettymouths"
- Chlorogaster
- Favillea
- Horakiella
- Pisolithus - including P. tinctorius (dyemaker's puffball)
- Scleroderma - "earthballs"

The genera Pisolithus, Scleroderma and Calostoma are known to be ectomycorrhizal.

== Taxonomy ==
Phylogenetic analysis places the Sclerodermataceae in the bolete clade. Older analysis suggests that the Sclerodermataceae (including the genera Scleroderma and Veligaster), the Pisolithaceae (Pisolithus), the Astraeaceae (Astraeus), Calostomataceae (Calostoma), and the new families Gyroporaceae (Gyroporus) and Boletinellaceae (Boletinellus and Phlebopus), should form a new suborder, the Sclerodermatineae.

== Gallery ==
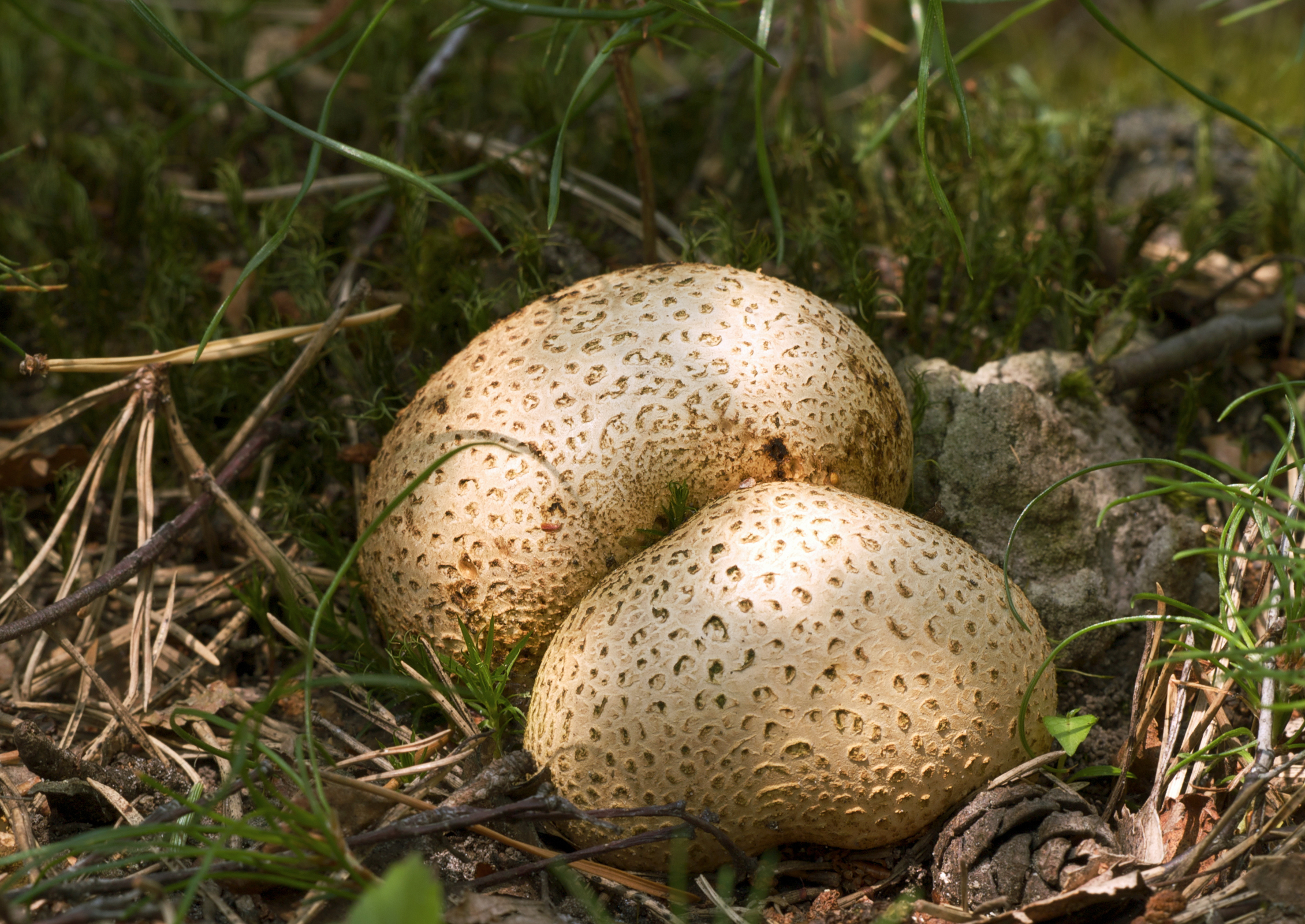
Scleroderma citrinum

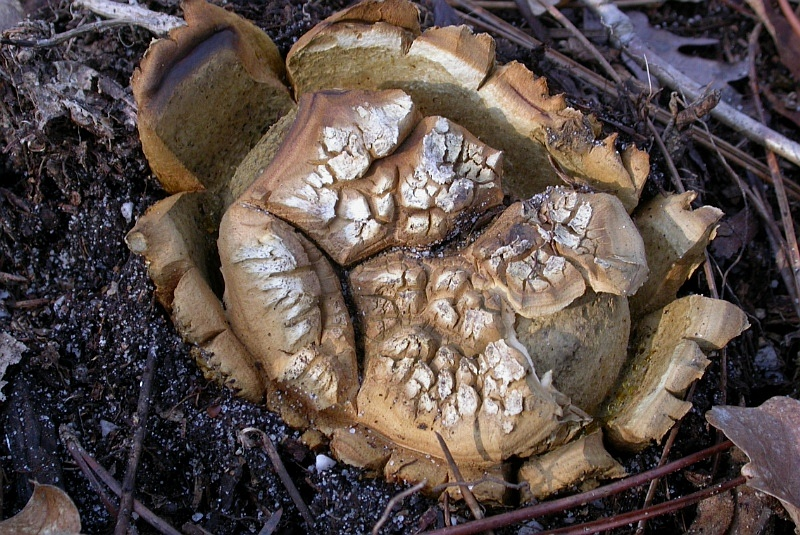
Scleroderma geaster

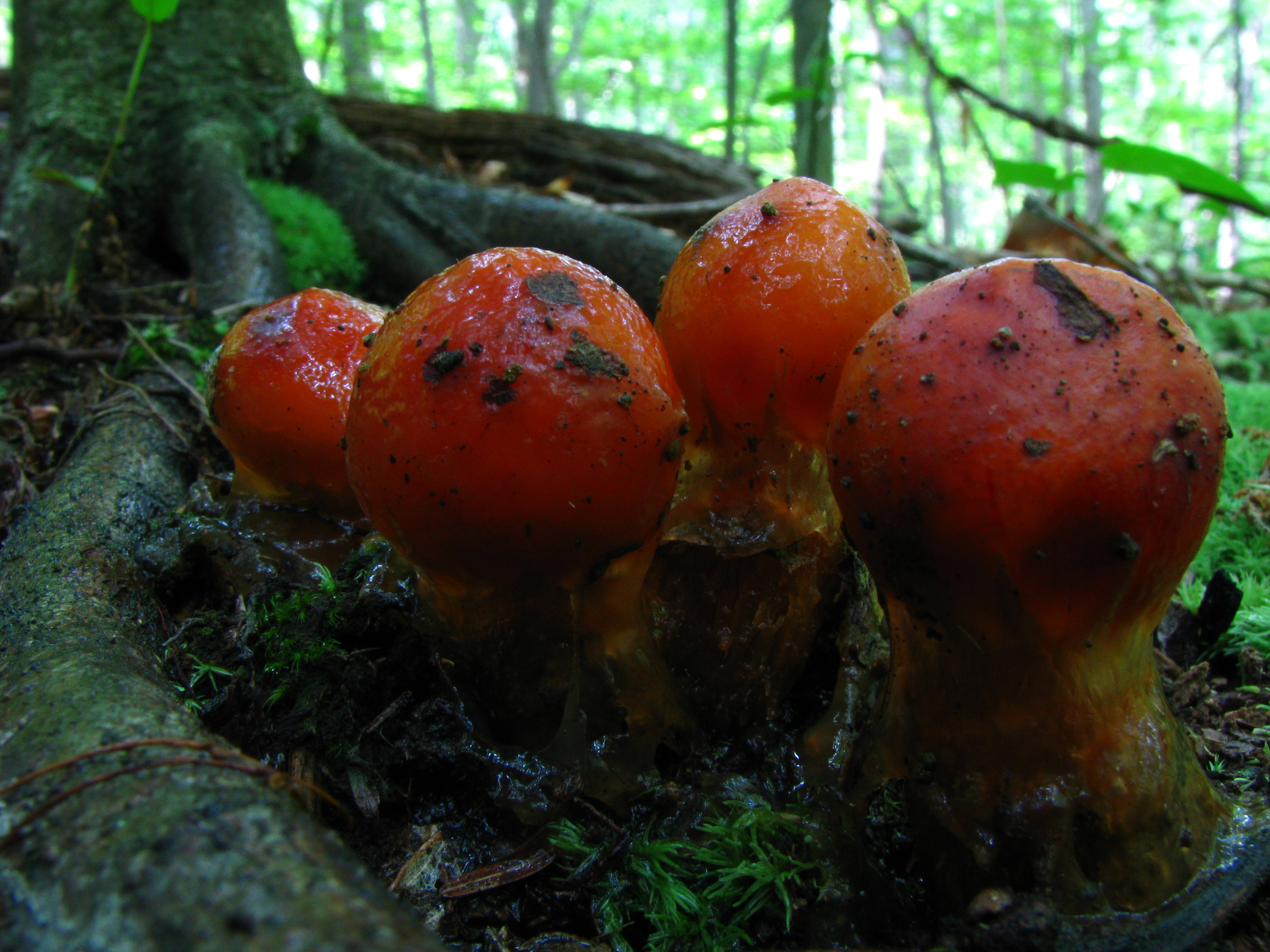
Calostoma cinnabarina

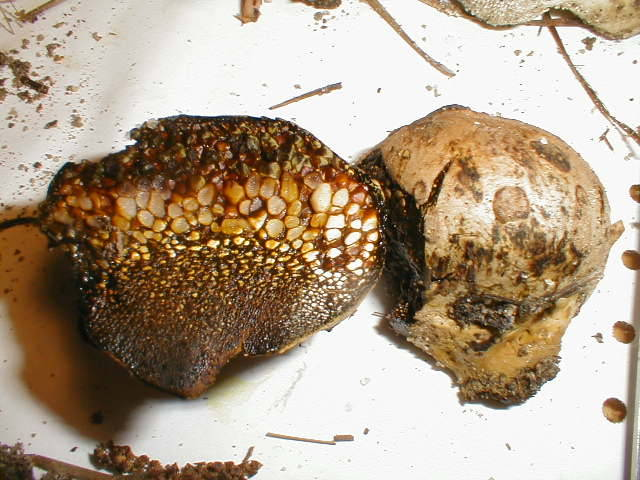
Pisolithus arhizus
