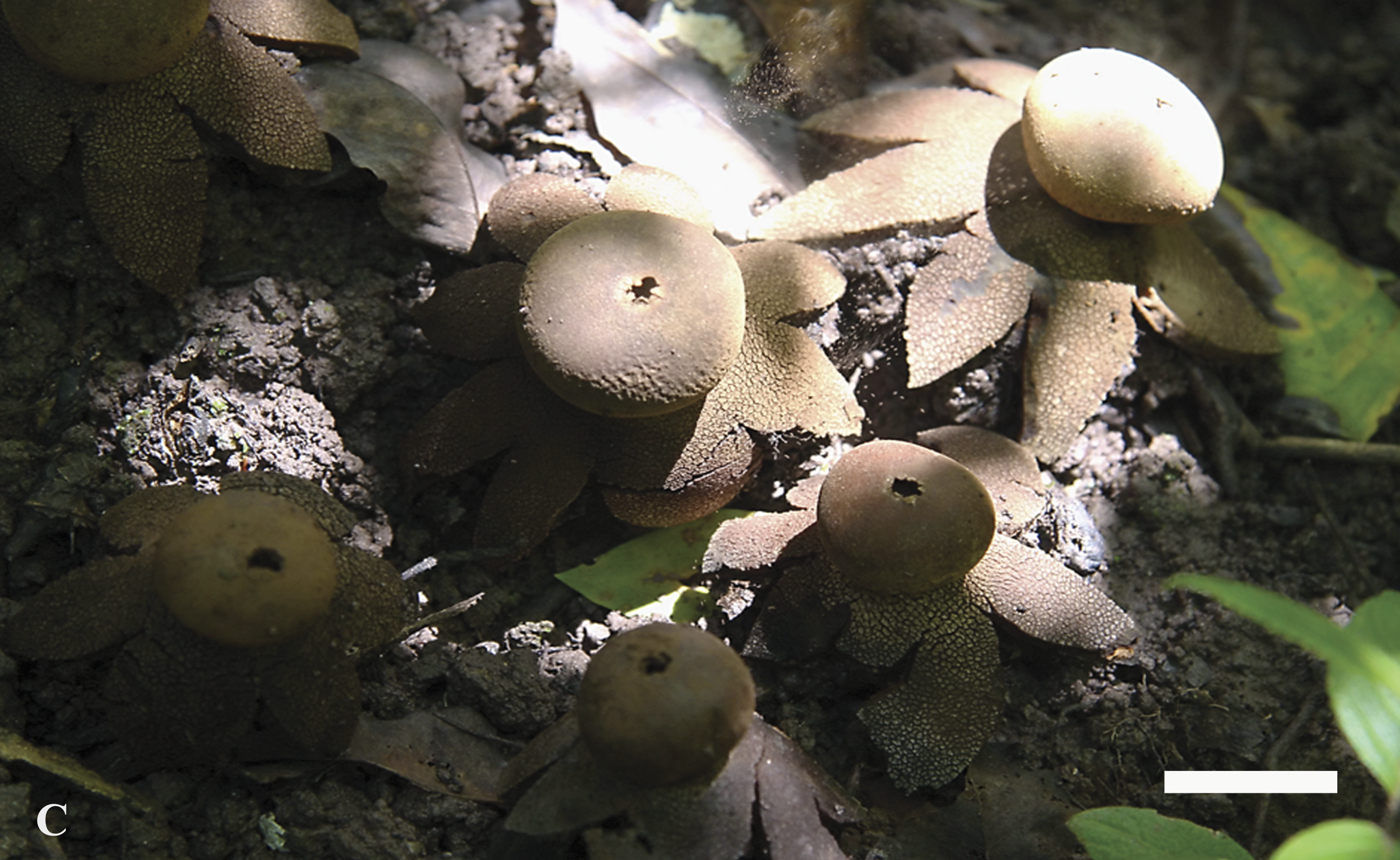
- Fruit bodies in the field; bar=2.5 cm

Scientific classification
- Kingdom: Fungi
- Division: Basidiomycota
- Class: Agaricomycetes
- Order: Boletales
- Family: Diplocystaceae
- Genus: Astraeus
- Species: A. sirindhorniae

Binomial name
- Astraeus sirindhorniae Watling, Phosri, Sihanonth, A.W.Wilson & M.P.Martín (2014)

= Astraeus sirindhorniae =

Species of fungus

Astraeus sirindhorniae Mycological characteristics
- Glebal hymenium
- No distinct cap
- Hymenium attachment is not applicable
- Lacks a stipe
- Spore print is brown
- Ecology is mycorrhizal

Astraeus sirindhorniae is a species of false earthstar in the family Diplocystaceae. A. sirindhorniae can be distinguished from close relatives A. odoratus, A. asiaticus and A. hygrometricus by differences in fruit body size, spore size, spore ornamentation, and peridium structure. The fungus was discovered in Phu Khieo Wildlife Sanctuary in northeastern Thailand, as part of a project to document the biodiversity of mycorrhizal fungi. The specific epithet sirindhorniae honors Princess Maha Chakri Sirindhorn on the occasion the 84th birthday of her father, King Bhumibol Adulyadej. Known only from north and northeastern Thailand, A. sirindhorniae is suspected to be ectomycorrhizal with members of the Dipterocarpaceae, although this has not yet been proven.
