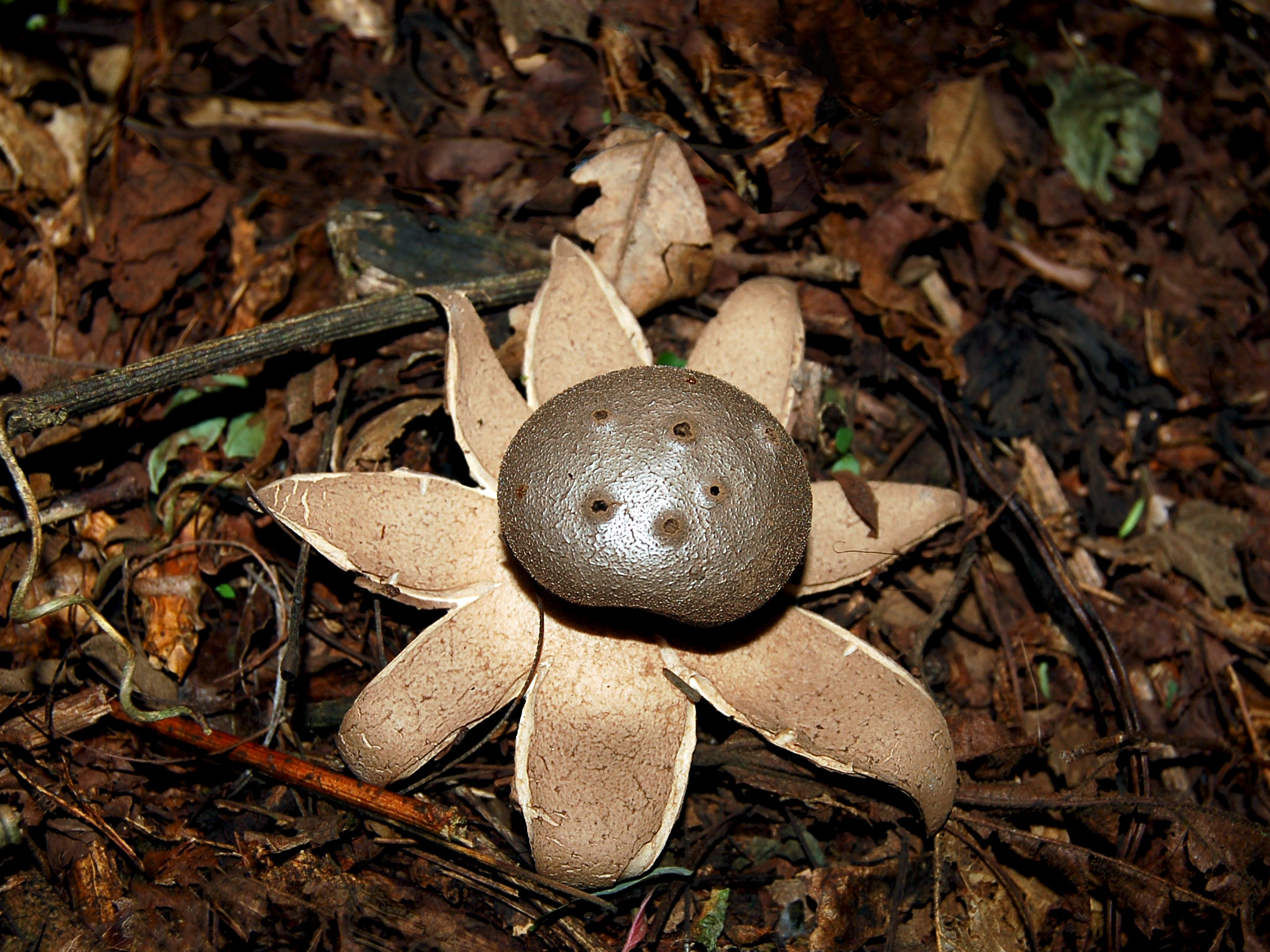
- Myriostoma calongei, Bolivia

Scientific classification
- Kingdom: Fungi
- Division: Basidiomycota
- Class: Agaricomycetes
- Order: Geastrales
- Family: Geastraceae
- Genus: Myriostoma; Desv. (1809)

Type species
- Myriostoma anglicum Desv. (1809)

Species
- Myriostoma areolatum; Myriostoma australianum; Myriostoma calongei; Myriostoma capillisporum; Myriostoma coliforme; Myriostoma herrerae

Synonyms
- Bovistoides Lloyd (1919); Polystoma Gray (1821)

= Myriostoma =

Genus of fungi

Myriostoma is a fungal genus in the family Geastraceae. Basidiocarps resemble earthstars, but the spore sac is supported by multiple columns (instead of a single column) and has multiple ostioles instead of a single, apical ostiole. Until 2017, the genus was thought to be monotypic with a single, widespread species, Myriostoma coliforme. Recent research has, however, shown that at least six species occur worldwide.

== Taxonomy and phylogeny ==
Nicaise Auguste Desvaux first defined and published the genus Myriostoma in 1809, with the single species Myriostoma anglicum (an illegitimate renaming of James Dickson's original Lycoperdon coliforme). In 1821 Samuel Frederick Gray described the superfluous genus Polystoma for it.

Myriostoma was classified in the family Geastraceae until 1973, when British mycologist Donald Dring placed it in the Astraeaceae (Note: Neither the family nor the order (Sclerodermatales) that Dring placed it in are recognized anymore: Astraeus is a member of Diplocystaceae and Sclerodermatales is a synonym of Boletales.) based on the presence of trabeculae (stout columns that extend from the peridium to the central core of the fruit body) in the gleba, and the absence of a true hymenium. In his 1989 monograph, Stellan Sunhede returned it to the Geastraceae. Molecular analysis of DNA sequences has confirmed the traditional belief that Myriostoma and Geastrum are closely related.

Recent molecular research, based on cladistic analysis of DNA sequences, has shown that the genus, previously thought to be monotypic, comprises at least six species worldwide.

== Etymology ==
The generic name is from the Greek words μυρίος, meaning "countless" and στόμα, meaning "mouth" (the source of the technical term stoma).

== Description ==
The fruit bodies start their development underground or buried in leaf debris, linked to a strand of mycelium at the base. As they mature, the exoperidium (the outer tissue layer of the peridium) splits open into 7 to 14 rays which curve backward; this pushes the fruit body above the substrate. Fully opened specimens can reach dimensions of 2–12 cm (0.8–4.7 in) from ray tip to tip. The rays are of unequal size, with tips that often roll back inward. They comprise three distinct layers of tissue. The inner pseudoparenchymatous layer (so named for the resemblance to the tightly packed cells of plant parenchyma) is fleshy and thick when fresh, and initially pale beige but darkening to yellow or brown as it matures, often cracking and peeling off in the process. The exterior mycelial layer, often matted with fine leaf debris or dirt, usually cracks to reveal a middle fibrous layer, which is made of densely packed hyphae. The base of the fruit body is concave to vaulted in shape, and often covered with adhering dirt. The roughly spherical spore sac (endoperidium) is supported by a cluster of short columns shaped like flattened spheres. It is grey-brown and often minutely roughened with small warts. There are several to many evenly dispersed mouths, the ostioles, mainly on the upper half of the endoperidium. They are roughly circular with fimbriate edges.

Like earthstars, Myriostoma species use the force of falling raindrops to help disperse the spores, which are ejected in little bursts when objects (such as rain) strike the outer wall of the spore sac. The gleba has a cotton-like texture that, when compressed, allows the endoperidium to flex quickly and create a puff of air that is forced out through the ostioles. This generates a cloud of spores that can then be carried by the wind. There are columellae (sterile structures that start at the base of the gleba and extend through it), which are usually not evident in the mature gleba, but apparent at the base of the spore sac. The columellae are not connected to the ostioles, but rather, terminate within the gleba at some distance from them. The capillitia (sterile strands within the gleba) are long, slender, free, tapering, and unbranched. The spores are spherical, nonamyloid, and are ornamented with irregularly shaped flaring protuberances. (Note: Scanning electron microscopy images of some Myriostoma spores can be viewed on page 256 of Suarez and Wright (1999).)

== Habitat and distribution ==
Myriostoma species are saprotrophic, deriving nutrients from decomposing organic matter. Fruit bodies grow grouped in well-drained or sandy soil, often in the partial shade of trees. Typical habitats include deciduous forests and mixed forests, gardens, along hedges and grassy road banks, and grazed grasslands.

Species have been described from Europe, Australia, Africa, South America, and Mexico; they are also known from North America and Asia.
