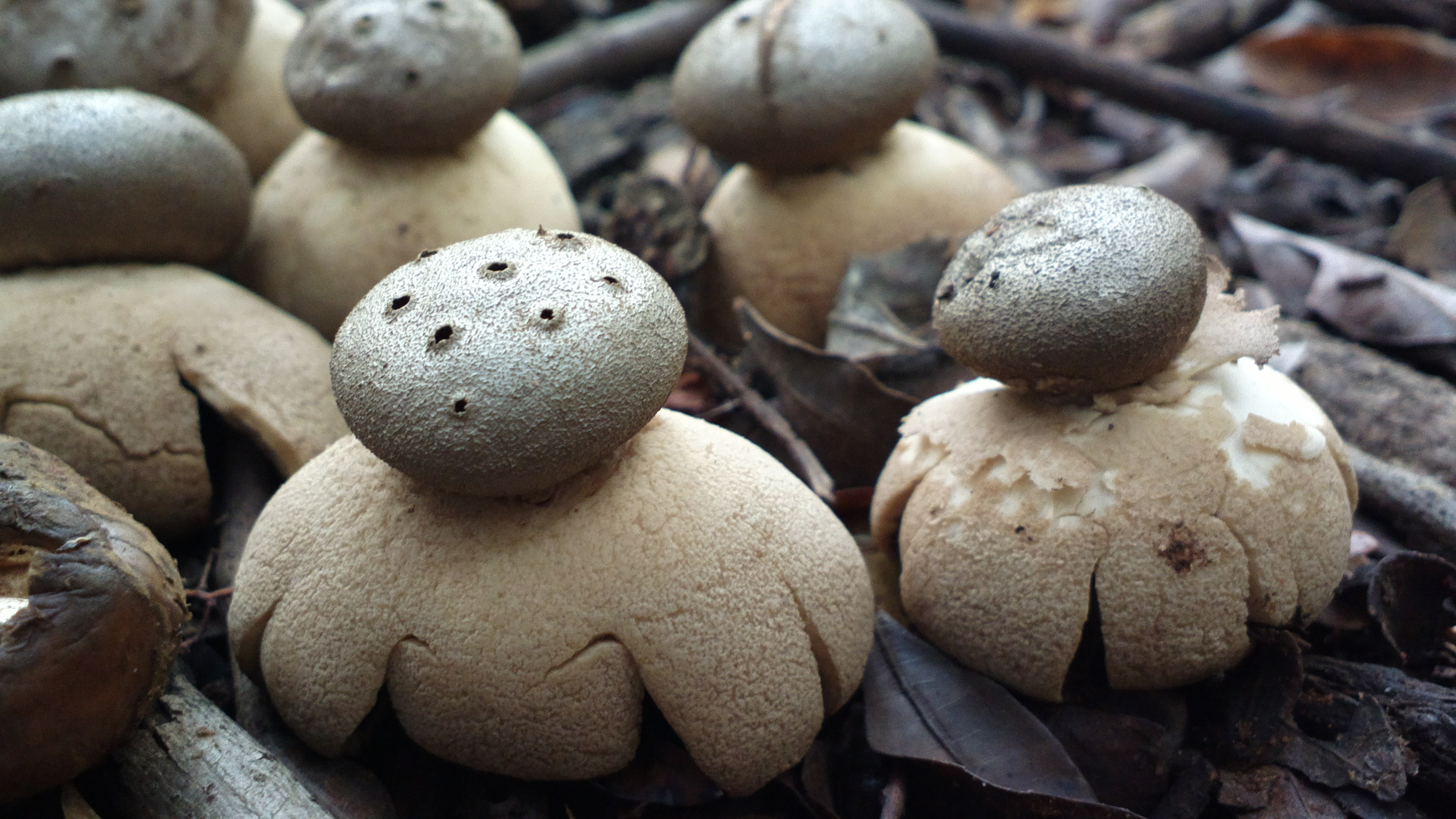
- Myriostoma capillisporum, Pretoria, South Africa

Scientific classification
- Kingdom: Fungi
- Division: Basidiomycota
- Class: Agaricomycetes
- Order: Geastrales
- Family: Geastraceae
- Genus: Myriostoma
- Species: M. capillisporum

Binomial name
- Myriostoma capillisporum (V.J. Staněk) Suz, A.M. Ainsw., Baseia & M.P. Martín (2017)

Synonyms
- Myriostoma coliforme var. capillisporum V.J. Staněk (1958)

= Myriostoma capillisporum =

Genus of fungus

Myriostoma capillisporum is a fungal species in the family Geastraceae. Basidiocarps resemble earthstars, but the spore sac is supported by multiple columns (instead of a single column) and has multiple ostioles instead of a single, apical ostiole. The fungus was originally described as a variety of Myriostoma coliforme, based on the distinctive and conspicuous ornamentation of its basidiospores. Recent molecular research, based on cladistic analysis of DNA sequences, has shown that it is a separate species, so far only known from South Africa.
