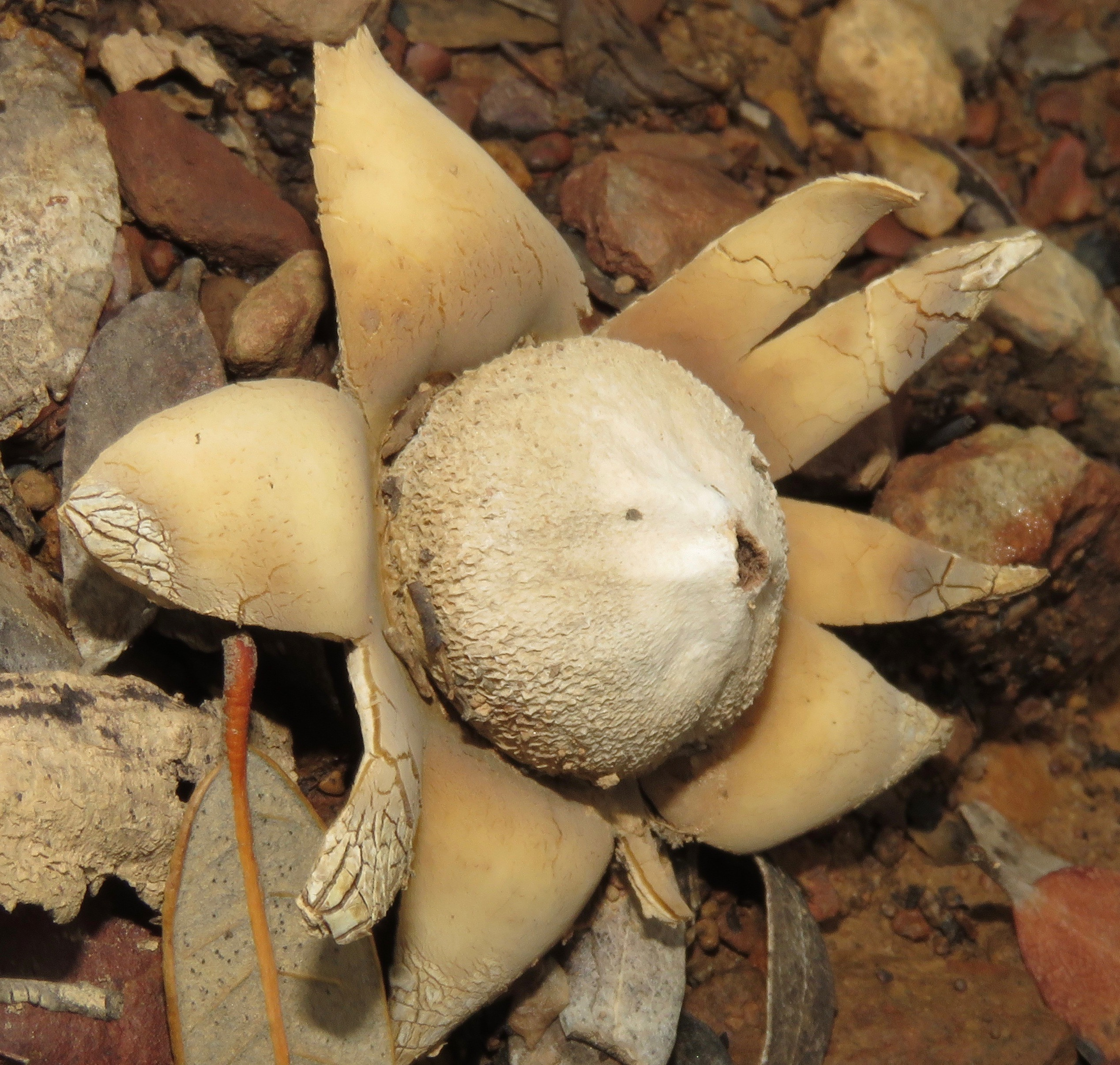

Scientific classification
- Domain: Eukaryota
- Kingdom: Fungi
- Division: Basidiomycota
- Class: Agaricomycetes
- Order: Boletales
- Family: Diplocystaceae
- Genus: Astraeus
- Species: A. morganii

Binomial name
- Astraeus morganii Phosri, Watling & M.P.Martín (2013)

= Astraeus morganii =

Species of fungus

Astraeus morganii is a species of false earthstar in the family Diplocystaceae. The fungus is found in the central to southern United States, extending southwards to Mexico. It is closely related to Astraeus pteridis, but has smaller fruit bodies and larger spores. The specific epithet honors American botanist Andrew Price Morgan.
