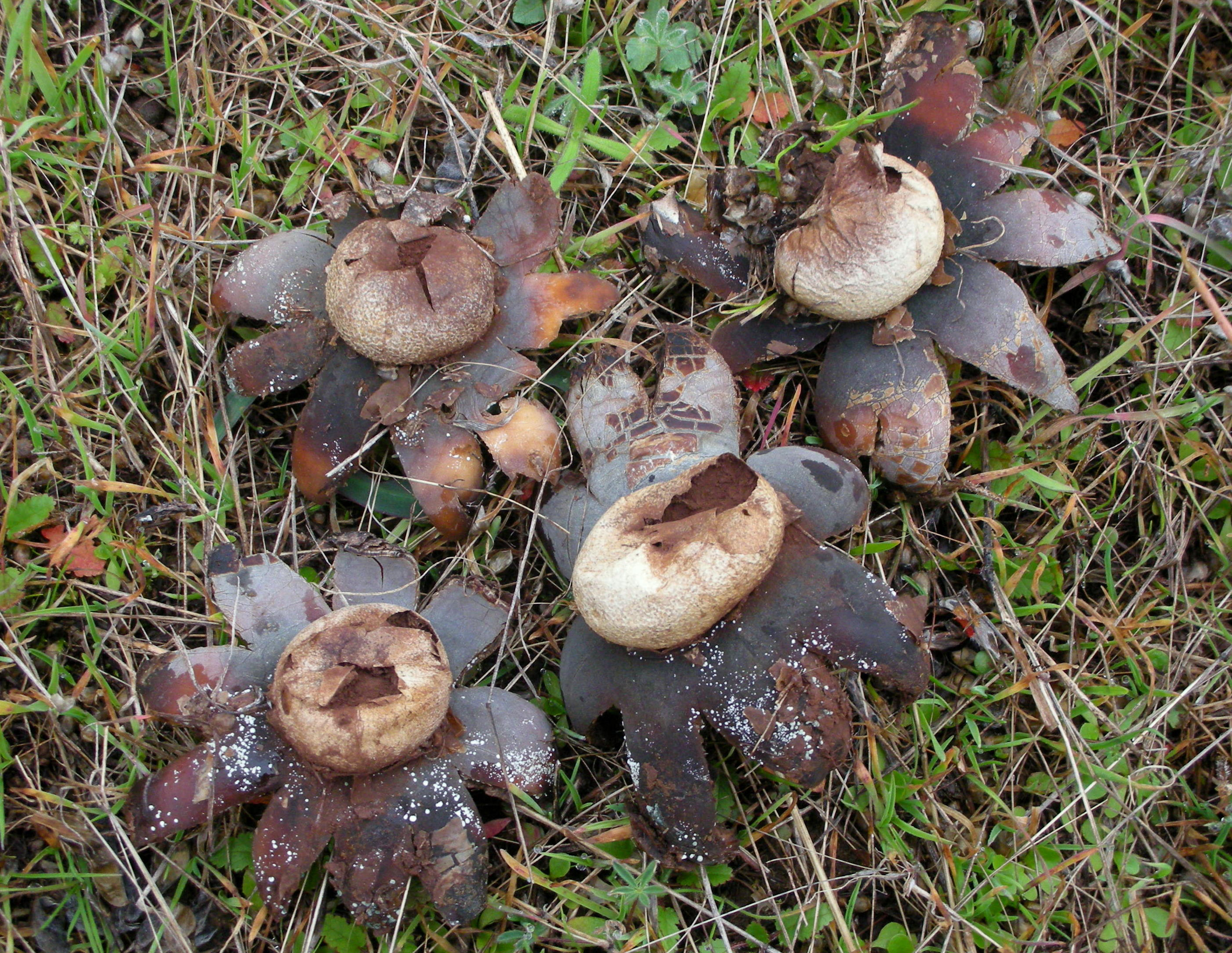

Scientific classification
- Domain: Eukaryota
- Kingdom: Fungi
- Division: Basidiomycota
- Class: Agaricomycetes
- Order: Boletales
- Family: Diplocystaceae
- Genus: Astraeus
- Species: A. pteridis

Binomial name
- Astraeus pteridis (Shear) Zeller (1948)

Synonyms
- Scleroderma pteridis Shear (1902)

= Astraeus pteridis =

Species of fungus

Astraeus pteridis Mycological characteristics
- Glebal hymenium
- No distinct cap
- Hymenium attachment is not applicable
- Lacks a stipe
- Spore print is brown
- Ecology is mycorrhizal
- Edibility is inedible

Astraeus pteridis, commonly known as the giant hygroscopic earthstar, is a species of false earthstar in the family Diplocystaceae. It is found in North America.

== Taxonomy ==
The species was described by American mycologist Cornelius Lott Shear in 1902 under the name Scleroderma pteridis. Sanford Myron Zeller transferred it to Astraeus in 1948.

== Description ==
A. pteridis reaches 5 to 15 centimetres (2 to 6 in) or more when expanded, and often has a more pronounced areolate pattern on the inner surface of the rays. Like other Astraeus species, it is hygroscopic, with rays expanding in humid conditions and closing in arid conditions. It is not typically considered edible.

It closely resembles the European A. hygrometricus, but is larger. Within Astraeus, A. pteridis is most closely related to A. morganii.

== Distribution ==
A molecular phylogenetic study from 2013 resulted in the application of the name A. pteridis to the larger Astraeus found in the Pacific Northwest region of North America. A. pteridis has also been found in the Canary Islands, Madeira, and Argentina, which share historical connections to Lusitania. It may be widely distributed or have been translocated.
