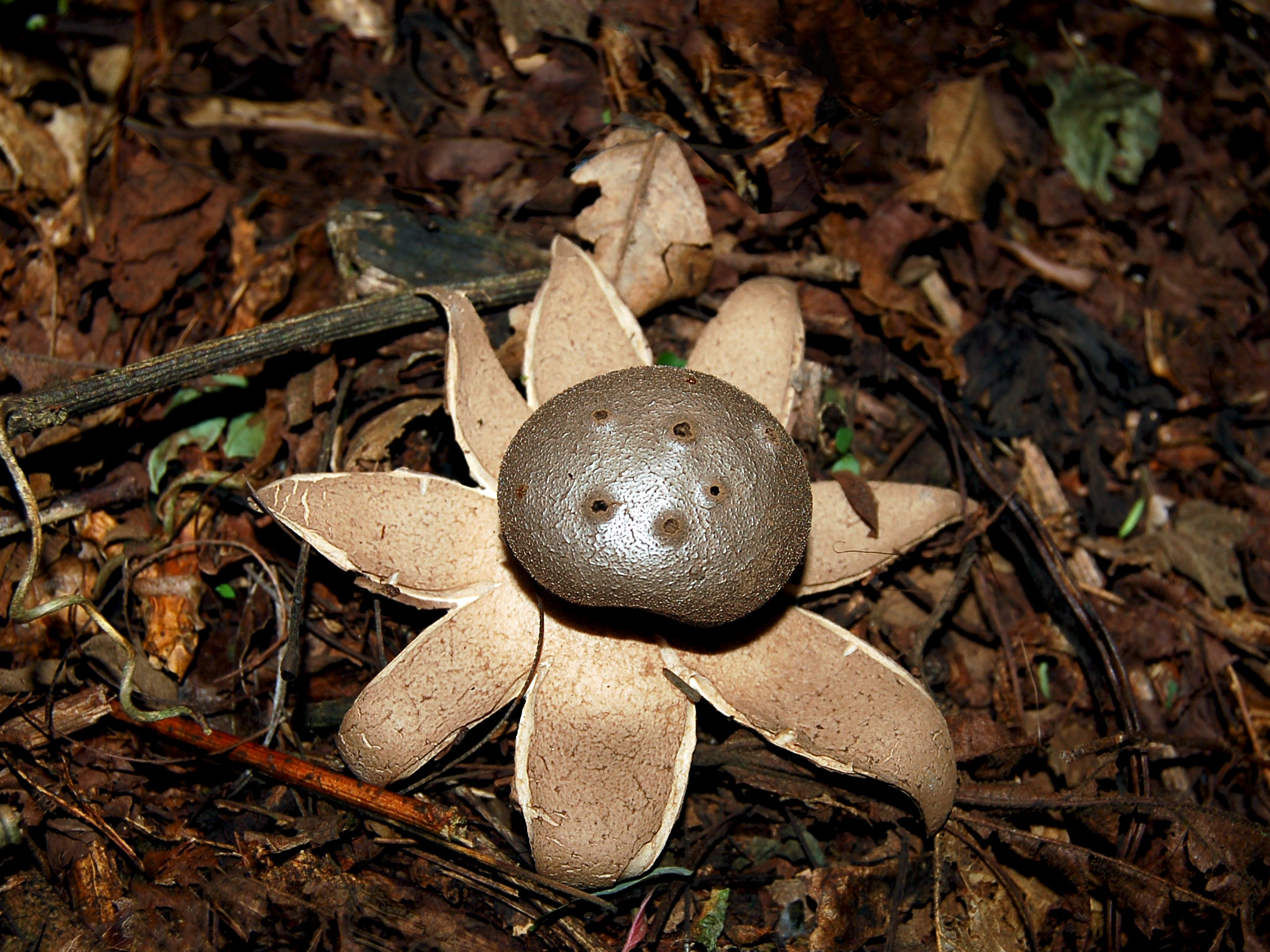
- Myriostoma calongei, Bolivia

Scientific classification
- Kingdom: Fungi
- Division: Basidiomycota
- Class: Agaricomycetes
- Order: Geastrales
- Family: Geastraceae
- Genus: Myriostoma
- Species: M. calongei

Binomial name
- Myriostoma calongei Baseia, J.O. Sousa & M.P. Martín (2017)

= Myriostoma calongei =

Genus of fungus

Myriostoma calongei is a fungal species in the family Geastraceae. Basidiocarps resemble earthstars, but the spore sac is supported by multiple columns (instead of a single column) and has multiple ostioles instead of a single, apical ostiole. The fungus was described from Brazil in 2017 as a result of molecular research, based on cladistic analysis of DNA sequences. Previously, it had been identified as Myriostoma coliforme, now known to be restricted to northern, temperate regions. Myriostoma calongei can be distinguished by the conspicuously verrucose (finely warted) endoperidium. The species has also been confirmed from Argentina, Mexico, and the United States (New Mexico).
