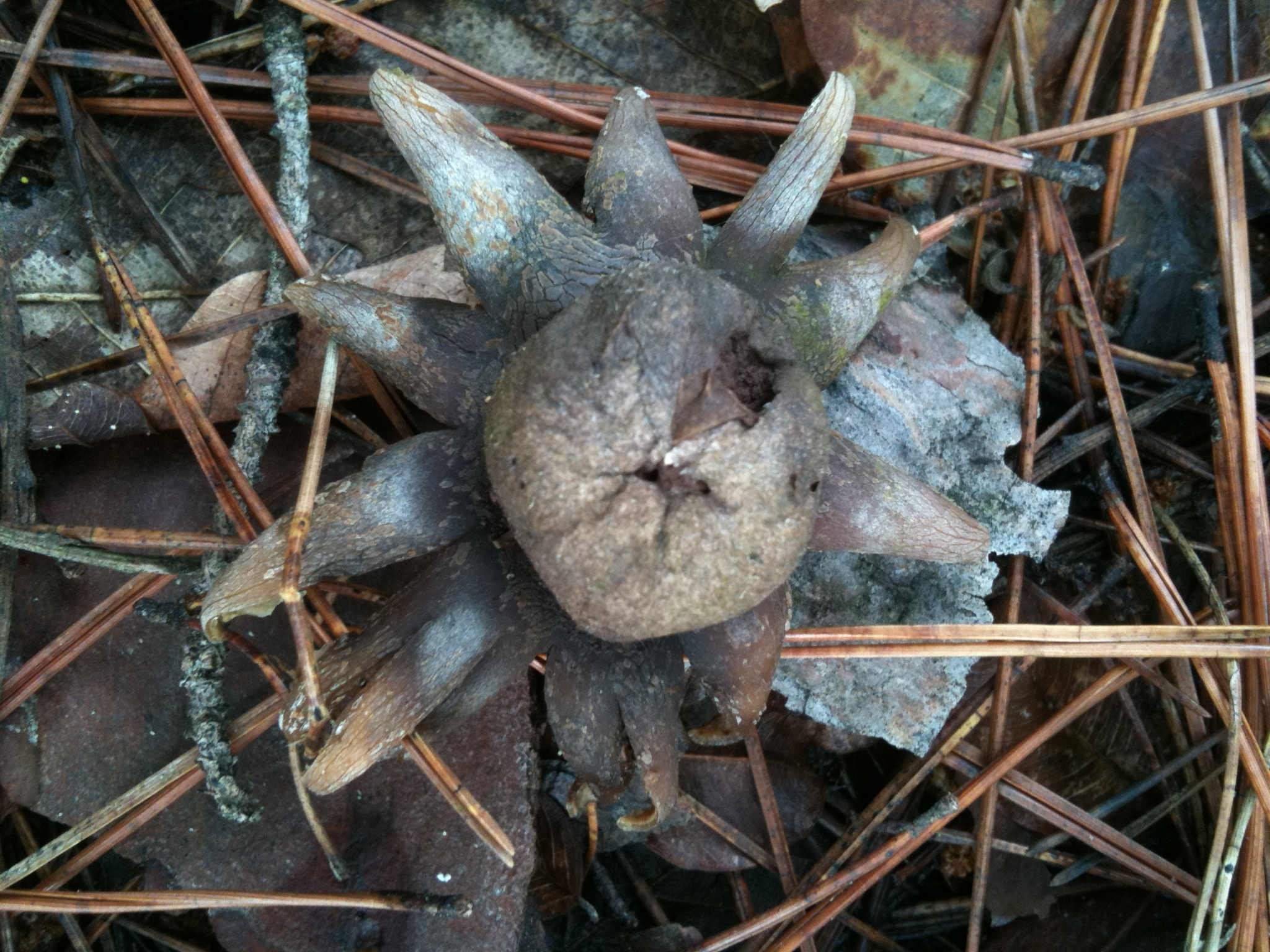

Scientific classification
- Domain: Eukaryota
- Kingdom: Fungi
- Division: Basidiomycota
- Class: Agaricomycetes
- Order: Boletales
- Family: Diplocystaceae
- Genus: Astraeus
- Species: A. koreanus

Binomial name
- Astraeus koreanus (V.J.Stanek) Kreisel (1976)

Synonyms
- Astraeus hygrometricus var. koreanus V.J.Stanek (1958)

= Astraeus koreanus =

Species of fungus

Astraeus koreanus Mycological characteristics
- Glebal hymenium
- No distinct cap
- Spore print is brown
- Ecology is mycorrhizal
- Edibility is inedible

Astraeus koreanus is a species of false earthstar in the family Diplocystaceae. Described as a new species in 1976, it is found in Korea. The species was originally named as a variety koreanus of Astraeus hygrometricus in 1958.
