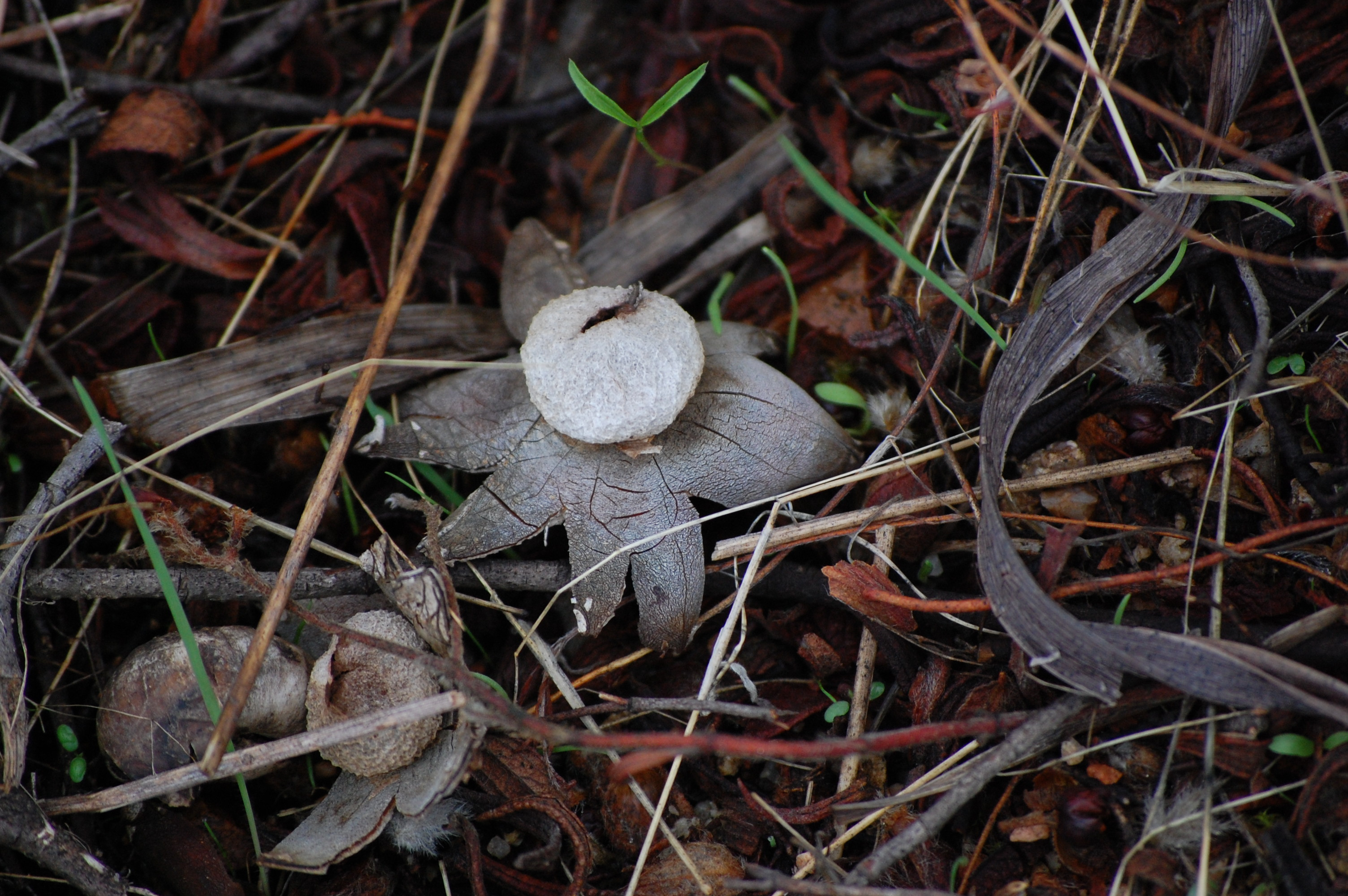

Scientific classification
- Kingdom: Fungi
- Division: Basidiomycota
- Class: Agaricomycetes
- Order: Boletales
- Family: Diplocystaceae
- Genus: Astraeus
- Species: A. telleriae

Binomial name
- Astraeus telleriae M.P.Martín, Phosri & Watling (2013)

= Astraeus telleriae =

Species of fungus

Astraeus telleriae is a species of false earthstar in the family Diplocystaceae. Described as new to science in 2013, it is found in the Mediterranean region in southwestern Europe, from southern Spain to Greece.

== Taxonomy ==
Astraeus telleriae is an earthstar fungus in the family Diplocystaceae (the "false earthstars"). It was described as a new species in 2013 by a team of mycologists led by María Martín, and named in honour of the Spanish mycologist María Teresa Tellería. This species was distinguished from the common barometer earthstar (Astraeus hygrometricus) by molecular phylogenetics analysis and subtle morphological traits. Astraeus telleriae has a very woolly inner surface on the spore sac and unique DNA barcode sequences that confirm it as a distinct species.

== Description ==
Similar in general appearance to other Astraeus earthstars, A. telleriae begins as a more or less spherical (globose) fruiting body 3–4 cm across that splits open into about a dozen pointed rays. The outer skin (exoperidium) is brown and splits into segments that curl back. The inner spore sac is pale buff to tan and covered with fine hairs, giving it a minutely woolly texture (a key diagnostic feature). When mature, the spore sac develops an irregular apical opening through which brownish spore dust is released. Microscopically, it produces globose warted spores about 7.5–12.5 μm in diameter. Like other earthstars, the rays of A. telleriae respond to humidity, curling closed when wet and re-opening as they dry.

== Habitat and distribution ==
Astraeus telleriae is a Mediterranean species of earthstar. It is ectomycorrhizal, associating with pine and oak trees in warm, lime-rich soils. The species is known from southwestern Europe, particularly the Iberian Peninsula and the western Mediterranean. It has been confirmed from Spain (Catalonia and Madrid regions) and Greece, and generally occurs in dry woodland margins from sea level up to about 1,000. Its epithet honours a Spanish scientist, and indeed A. telleriae was first identified from Spain (holotype from Greece, but additional collections from southern Spain). A. telleriae is now one of several earthstar species recognized in Europe. Its discovery demonstrates that what was once thought a cosmopolitan earthstar is actually a complex of regional species adapted to specific climates.
