= A. smithii =

A. smithii may refer to:

- Asteriscus smithii, species of flower
- Astraeus smithii, species of fungus
