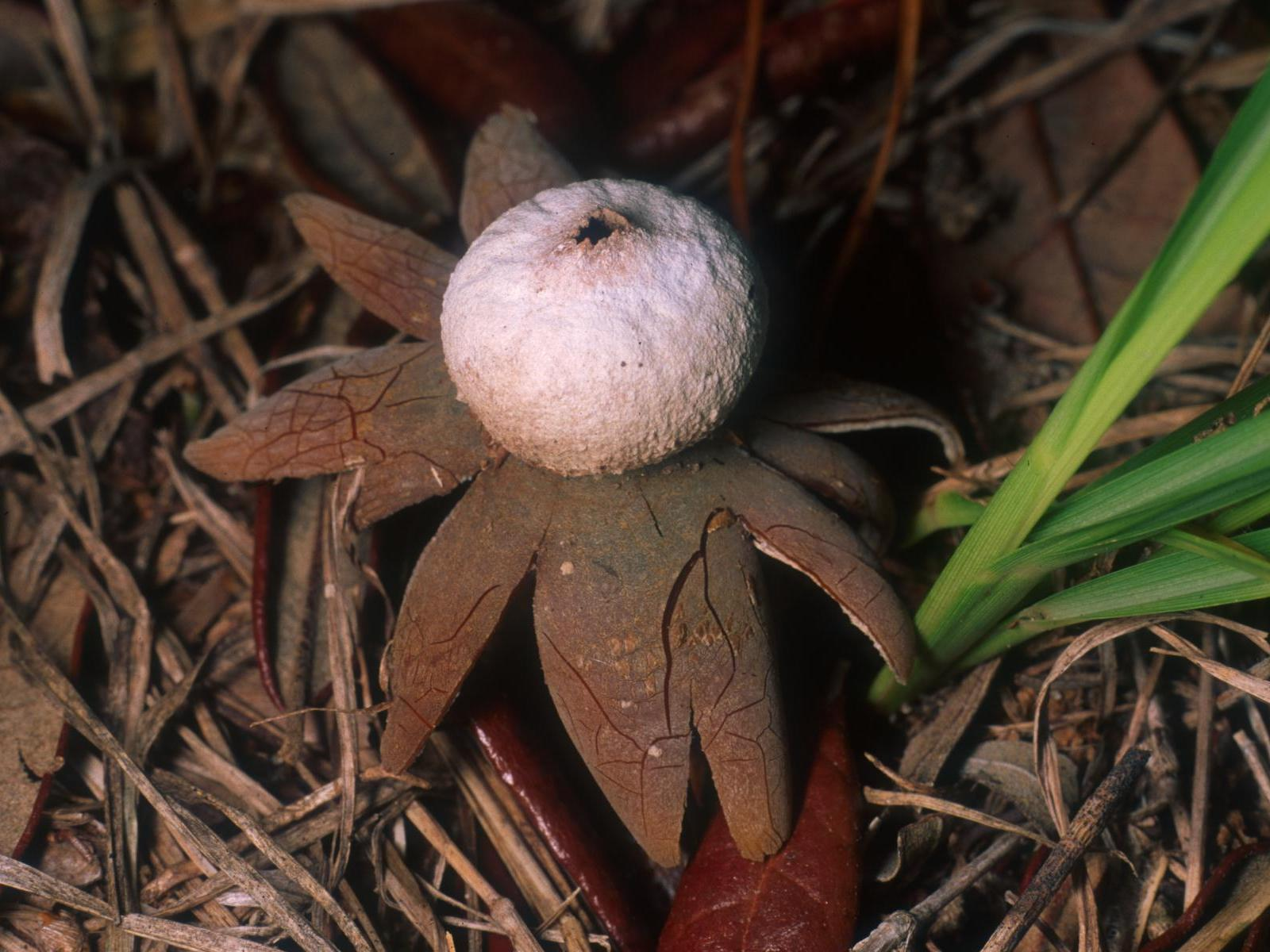
- Astraeus hygrometricus

Scientific classification
- Kingdom: Fungi
- Division: Basidiomycota
- Class: Agaricomycetes
- Order: Boletales
- Family: Diplocystaceae
- Genus: Astraeus; Morgan (1885)

Type species
- Astraeus hygrometricus (Pers.) Morgan (1889)

Species
- A. asiaticus A. hygrometricus A. koreanus A. morganii A. odoratus A. pteridis A. sirindhorniae A. smithii A. telleriae

= Astraeus (fungus) =

Genus of fungi

Astraeus is a genus of fungi in the family Diplocystaceae. The genus, which has a cosmopolitan distribution, contains nine species of earthstar mushroom. They are distinguished by the outer layer of flesh (exoperidium) that at maturity splits open in a star-shape manner to reveal a round spore sac. Additionally, they have a strongly hygroscopic character—the rays will open when moist, but when hot and dry will close to protect the spore sac. Species of Astraeus grow on the ground in ectomycorrhizal associations with trees and shrubs. Despite their similar appearance to the Geastrum earthstars, the species of Astraeus are not closely related.

== Description ==
The mycelium of immature specimens is fibrous, and originates from all parts of the surface. The peridium is roughly spherical, and made of two distinct tissue layers. The outer layer, the exoperidium, is thick, leathery, and initially inseparable from the inner layer (endoperidium). At maturity, the exoperidium bursts open into several pointed "rays". The inner layer of tissue, the endoperidium, is thin, like a membrane. The spore case enclosed by the endoperidium has no stalk (sessile), and is opened at the top by a tear or pore. Microscopically, sterile cells, long-threaded cells called capillitium originate from the inner surface of the peridium; they are highly branched and interwoven. The spores are large, spherical, minutely warted, and brown. Astraeus species are strongly hygroscopic, and absorb moisture from the environment, so that the rays are closed over the spore case when dry, but open up flat when moistened.

== History ==
The genus Astraeus was first described by the American mycologist and botanist Andrew Price Morgan in 1885. The outward resemblance of Astraeus species with those from genus Geaster (family Geastraceae) has led several authors to place them in that genus.

Phylogenetic analyses proved that the genus Astraeus together with the genera Boletinellus, Phlebopus, Pisolithus, Calostoma, Gyroporus, Scleroderma, and Veligaster, form a distinct phylogenetic lineage in the Boletales; these genera collectively form the suborder Sclerodermatineae. The similarity between Geastrum and Astraeus species is an example of convergent evolution. Astraeus is currently classified in the family Diplocystaceae.

== Species ==
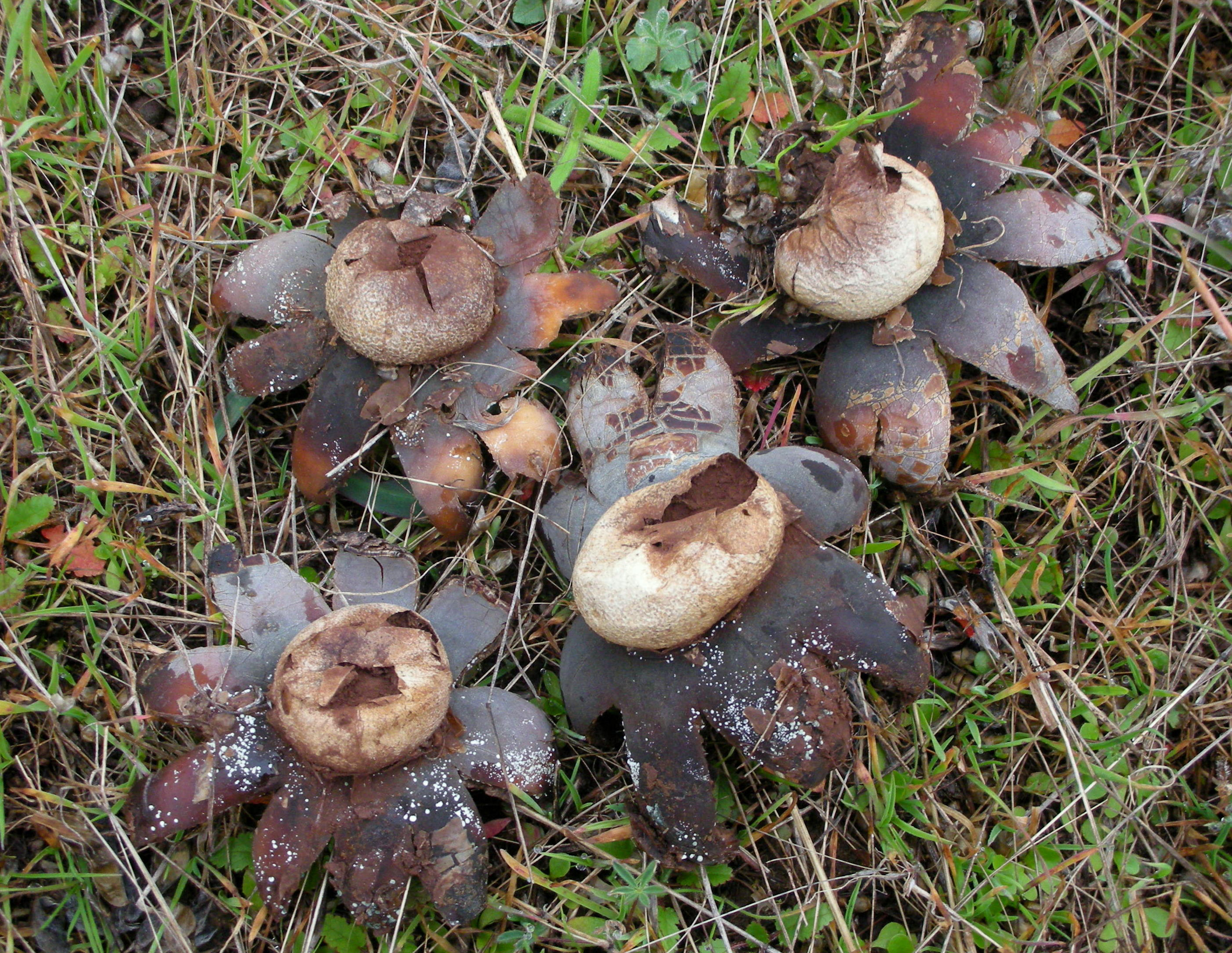
Astraeus pteridis is a North American species.

For a long time, the genus Astraeus was thought to contain at most two species. However, studies in the 2000s showed that species collected from around the world and labelled under the specific epithet hygrometricus were actually considerably variable in a number of macroscopic and microscopic characteristics. A molecular study of the DNA sequences of the ITS region of the ribosomal DNA from a number of Astraeus specimens from around the world has helped to establish the phylogenetic relationships within the genus. Currently, eight species are recognized:

- Astraeus asiaticus Phosri, M.P. Martín & Watling

This species, thought to be an Asian version of A. hygrometricus, is found in the northern areas of Thailand. Its gleba has a purplish-chestnut color when mature, and a granulate outer peridium. The range of its spore sizes are generally larger than A. hygrometricus (upper diameter of 15.2 μm).

- Astraeus hygrometricus (Pers.) Morgan
- Astraeus koreanus (V.J.Staněk) Kreisel
- Astraeus morganii Phosri, Watling & M.P.Martín
- Astraeus odoratus Phosri, Watling, M.P.Martín & Whalley

Discovered in Thailand, fresh species have a strong odor, and a smooth outer surface.

- Astraeus pteridis (Shear) Zeller
- Astraeus sirindhorniae Watling, Phosri, Sihanonth, A.W.Wilson & M.P.Martín
- Astraeus smithii Watling, M.P.Martín & Phosri
- Astraeus telleriae M.P.Martín, Phosri & Watling

== Bioactive compounds ==
In 2008, five lanostane-type triterpenes were isolated and identified from the fruit bodies of A. pteridis; two of these compounds had an inhibitory effect on the growth of the pathogen Mycobacterium tuberculosis.
