= Tremellogaster =

Scientific classification
- Domain: Eukaryota
- Kingdom: Fungi
- Division: Basidiomycota
- Class: Agaricomycetes
- Order: Boletales
- Family: Diplocystaceae
- Genus: Tremellogaster; E.Fisch. (1924)

Type species
- Tremellogaster surinamensis E.Fisch. (1924)

Genus of fungi

Tremellogaster is a fungal genus in the Diplocystaceae family. A monotypic genus, it contains the single species Tremellogaster surinamensis, known from Suriname and Guyana.
