= Endogonopsis =

Conservation status
- Data Deficient (IUCN 3.1)

Scientific classification
- Kingdom: Fungi
- Division: Basidiomycota
- Class: Agaricomycetes
- Order: Boletales
- Family: Diplocystaceae
- Genus: Endogonopsis; R.Heim, 1966
- Species: E. sacramentarium

Binomial name
- Endogonopsis sacramentarium R.Heim

Genus of fungi

Endogonopsis is a poorly known fungal genus, provisionally placed in the Diplocystaceae family. A monotypic genus, it contains the single species Endogonopsis sacramentarium, known from southern Asia. It was originally described by French mycologist Roger Heim in 1966.
