= Astraeus odoratus =

Scientific classification
- Domain: Eukaryota
- Kingdom: Fungi
- Division: Basidiomycota
- Class: Agaricomycetes
- Order: Boletales
- Family: Diplocystaceae
- Genus: Astraeus
- Species: A. odoratus

Binomial name
- Astraeus odoratus Phosri, Watling, M.P.Martín & Whalley (2004)

Synonyms
- Astraeus thailandicus Petcharat (2003)

Species of fungus

Astraeus odoratus Mycological characteristics
- Glebal hymenium
- No distinct cap
- Spore print is brown
- Ecology is mycorrhizal
- Edibility is not recommended

Astraeus odoratus (Thai: เห็ดเผาะหนัง; Het pho nang เห็ดเผาะหนัง, Het pho เห็ดเผาะ, or Het nang เห็ดหนัง, the latter meaning "skin mushroom") is a species of false earthstar in the family Diplocystaceae. Described as a new species in 2004, it was originally found in the Thai highlands growing in sandy or laterite-rich soil in dry lowland dipterocarp forests. The species is found in Southeast Asia.

== Description ==
Fruit bodies begin as brownish spheres or flattened spheres, partially submerged in the earth. The outer tissue layer, the exoperidium, splits open in a star-like fashion into 3–9 rays. The rays are hygroscopic, spreading out when moist and curling inward when dry. The fully expanded fruit body measures up to 65 millimetres (2.6 in) in diameter. Fresh fruit bodies have an odor similar to moist soil.

The spores are spherical, covered with spines, and measure 7.5–15.2 μm. The ornamentation of the spines on the surface is less dense than that of the similar Astraeus hygrometricus.

== Habitat and distribution ==
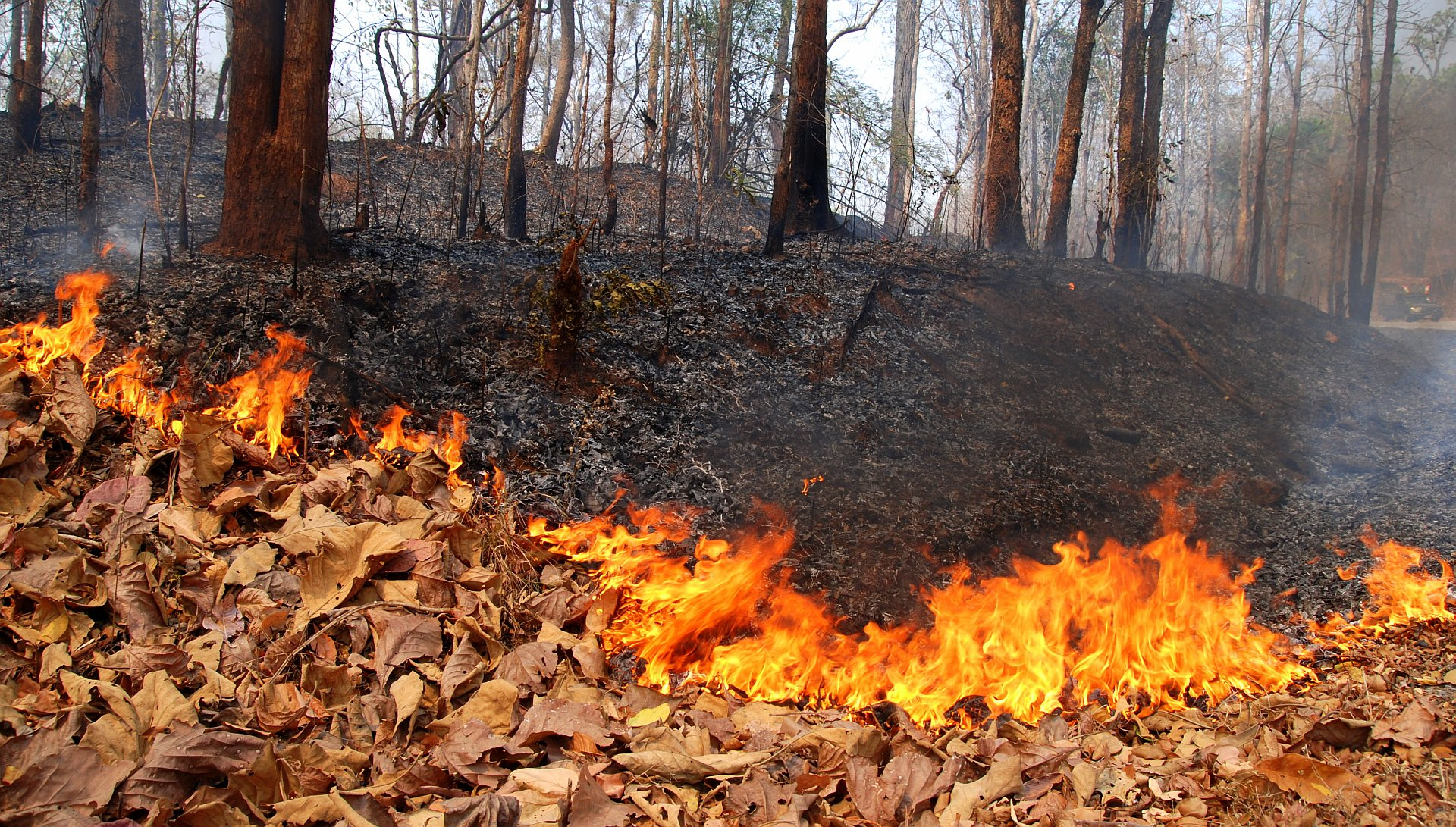
The mountain forests of Northern Thailand are set on fire by local farmers during the hot dry season from February to April in an attempt to increase the yield of the false earthstar.

Astraeus odoratus it is found in the dry lowland dipterocarp forests of Thailand. The fungus fruits during the rainy season in May and June, in sandy or laterite-rich soil. It is associated with Alder, Chestnut, Eucalyptus and Douglas-fir.

In Thailand, it is commonly believed that forest fires stimulate the growth of mushrooms, including A. odoratus, and fires are set intentionally to increase the yield of fruit bodies. Although the mushrooms may be easier to find and collect on the litter-free ground of burnt forest, there is no evidence that burning increases yield, while it does decrease the biodiversity and yield of other edible mushroom-producing fungi.

== Uses ==
Since they cannot be cultivated commercially, these mushrooms fetch a high price on the market.

Young fruit bodies are collected from the wild and sold in the markets of Thailand. Thai people eat the blanched mushroom with nam phrik (Thai chilli pastes) or nam chim (dipping sauces), or cooked in curry and also only boiled in water with fish sauce and palm sugar.

== See also ==
- Astraeus asiaticus
