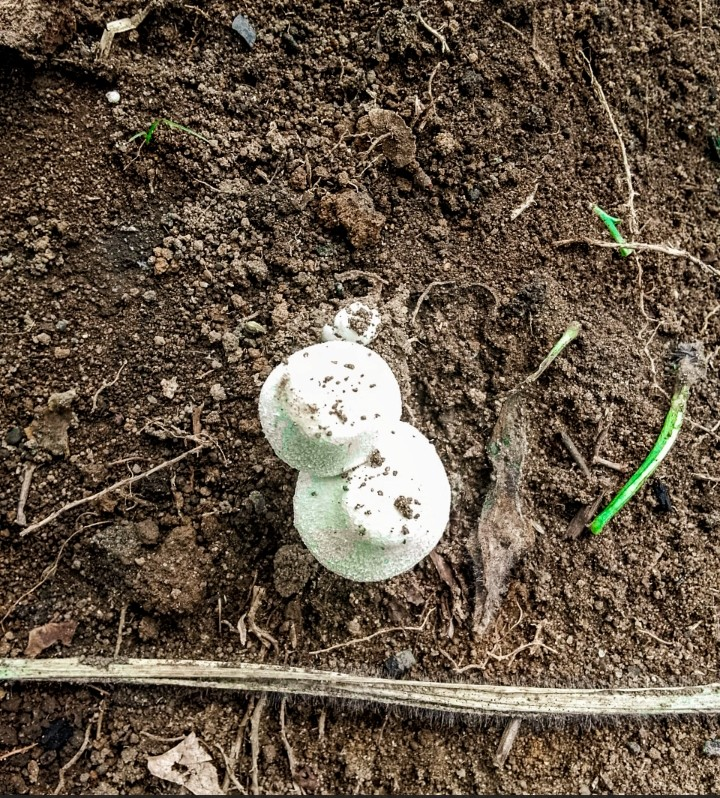
- Bovistella radicata

Scientific classification
- Kingdom: Fungi
- Division: Basidiomycota
- Class: Agaricomycetes
- Order: Agaricales
- Family: Agaricaceae
- Genus: Bovistella; Morgan (1892)

Type species
- Bovistella ohiensis (Ellis & Morgan) Morgan (1892)

Synonyms
- Lycoperdon subgen. Bovistella (Morgan) Jeppson & E.Larss. (2007); Calvatiella C.H.Cho (1936)

= Bovistella =

Genus of fungi

Bovistella is a genus of puffball fungi in the family Agaricaceae. The genus was circumscribed by mycologist Andrew Price Morgan in 1892.

== Species ==
As of January 2016, the nomenclatural authority Index Fungorum accepts 20 species in Bovistella:

- Bovistella alpina D.A.Reid 1969
- Bovistella ammophila (Lév.) Lloyd 1902
- Bovistella atrobrunnea Zeller 1948
- Bovistella australiana Lloyd 1905
- Bovistella conspurcata (Berk. & Broome) Petch 1919
- Bovistella davisii Lloyd 1906
- Bovistella dominicensis Lloyd 1906
- Bovistella floridensis Peck 1909
- Bovistella glabrescens Lloyd 1906
- Bovistella henningsii Lloyd 1906
- Bovistella humidicola Bowerman 1962
- Bovistella japonica Lloyd 1906
- Bovistella longipedicellata Teng 1932
- Bovistella melanospora Kreisel 1993
- Bovistella nigrica Lloyd 1922
- Bovistella poeltii Kreisel 1969
- Bovistella reticulata Sosin 1959
- Bovistella rosea Lloyd 1906
- Bovistella sinensis Lloyd 1923
- Bovistella verrucosa G.Cunn. 1925

== See also ==
- List of Agaricaceae genera
- List of Agaricales genera
