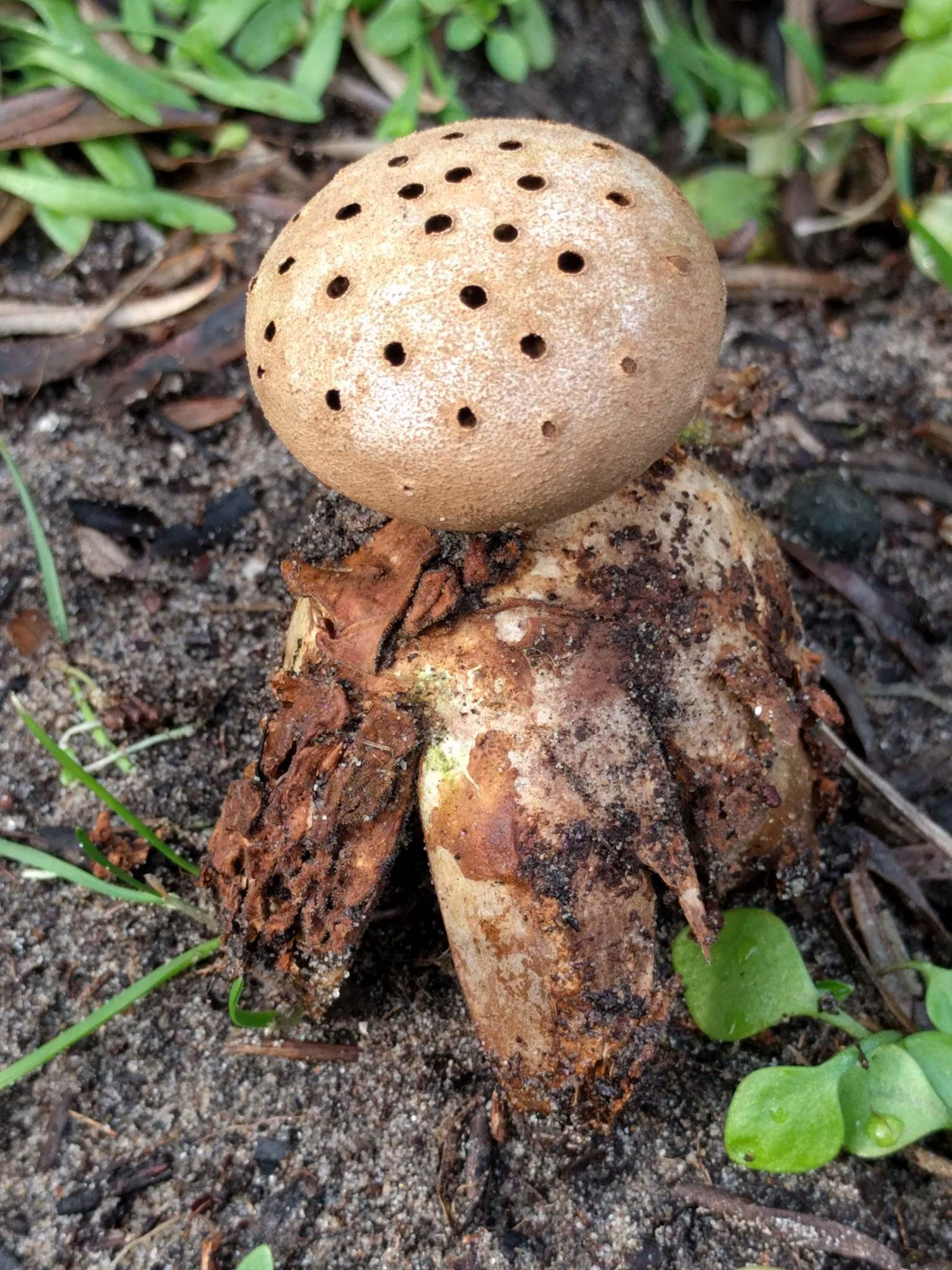
- Myriostoma coliforme in the Netherlands

Scientific classification
- Kingdom: Fungi
- Division: Basidiomycota
- Class: Agaricomycetes
- Order: Geastrales
- Family: Geastraceae
- Genus: Myriostoma
- Species: M. coliforme

Binomial name
- Myriostoma coliforme (Dicks.) Corda (1842)

Synonyms
- Lycoperdon coliforme Dicks. (1785); Geastrum coliforme (Dicks.) Pers. (1801); Myriostoma anglicum Desv. (1809); Polystoma coliforme (Dicks.) Gray (1821); Myriostoma coliforme (Dicks.) Corda (1842)

= Myriostoma coliforme =

Genus of fungus

Myriostoma coliforme
- Mycological characteristics
- Glebal hymenium
- No distinct cap
- Spore print is brown
- Edibility is inedible

Myriostoma coliforme, commonly known as the saltshaker earthstar or pepper pot, is a fungal species in the family Geastraceae. The basidiocarps resemble earthstars, but the spore sac is supported by multiple columns (instead of a single column) and has multiple ostioles instead of a single, apical ostiole. It has also been called "salt-shaker earthstar".

The fungus has a north temperate distribution, but was formerly thought to be more widespread due to confusion with related Myriostoma species. It is an uncommon species and appears on the Red Lists of 12 European countries. In 2004 it was one of 33 species proposed for protection under the Bern Convention by the European Council for Conservation of Fungi.

== Taxonomy ==
The species was first mentioned in the scientific literature by Samuel Doody in the second edition of John Ray's Synopsis methodica stirpium Britannicarum in 1696. Doody briefly described the fungus as: "fungus pulverulentus, coli instar perforatus, cum volva stellata" (a powdery fungus, perforated like a colander, with a star-shaped volva), and went on to explain that he found it in 1695 in Kent.

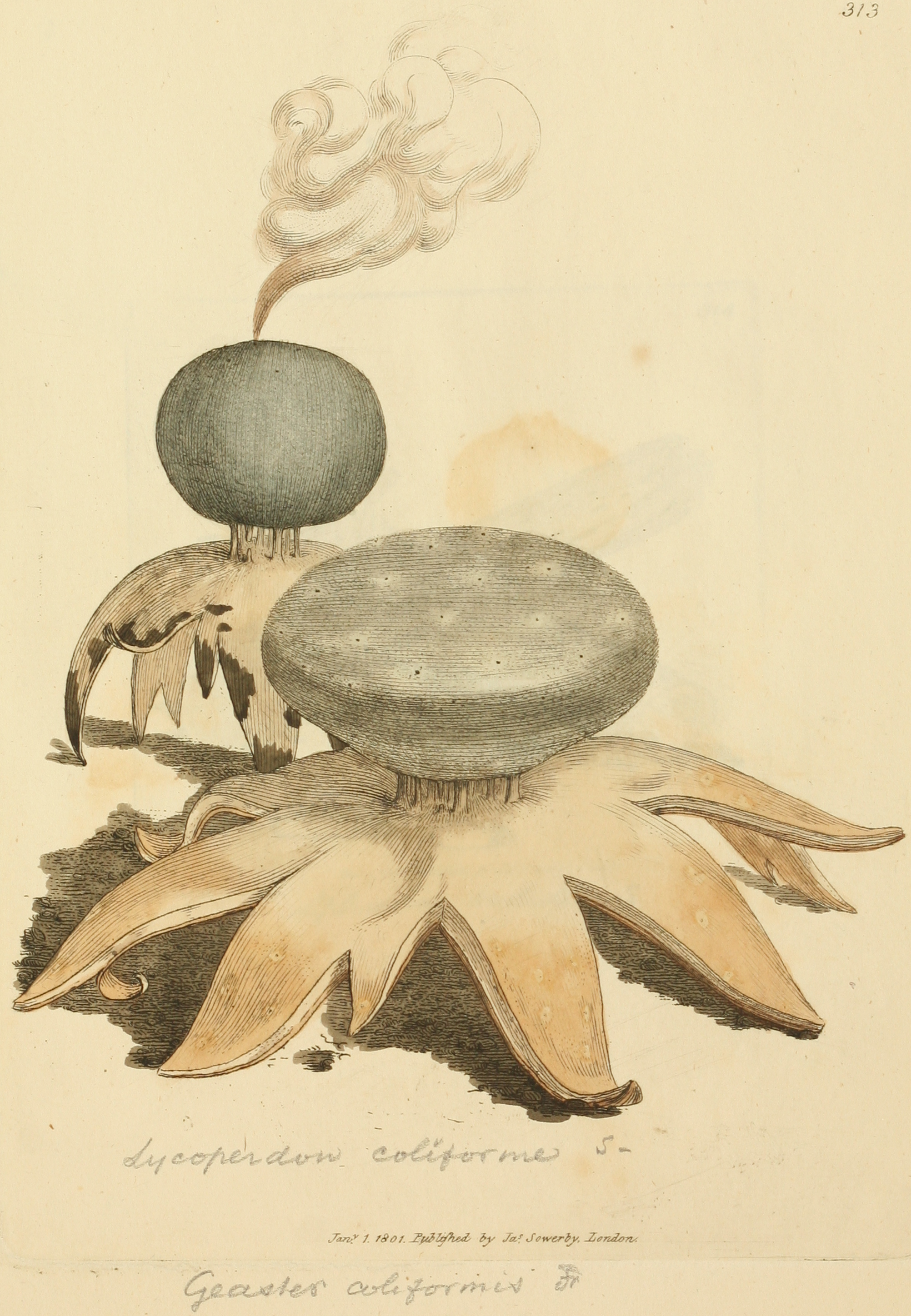
Illustration from James Sowerby's Coloured Figures of English Fungi or Mushrooms (1803)

It was first described scientifically as a new species in 1785 from collections made in England by James Dickson, who named it Lycoperdon coliforme. He found it growing in roadside banks and hedgerows among nettles in Suffolk and Norfolk. Nicaise Auguste Desvaux first defined and published the new genus Myriostoma in 1809, with the species renamed Myriostoma anglicum (an illegitimate renaming). Christian Hendrik Persoon had previously placed the species in Geastrum in 1801, while in 1821 Samuel Frederick Gray described the genus Polystoma for it. Myriostoma coliforme received its current and final name when August Carl Joseph Corda moved Dickson's name to Myriostoma in 1842, replacing Desvaux's illegitimate name.

== Etymology ==
The generic name Myriostoma is derived from the Ancient Greek "Myrios" (ten thousand – as in Myriad) and "stoma" (mouth) and means "thousands of mouths". The specific epithet is derived from the [Latin] words colum, meaning "strainer", and forma, meaning "shape". M.J. Berkeley gave it the English name "Cullenden puff-ball" which also refers to a colander. Samuel Frederick Gray called it the "sievelike pill-box".

== Description ==
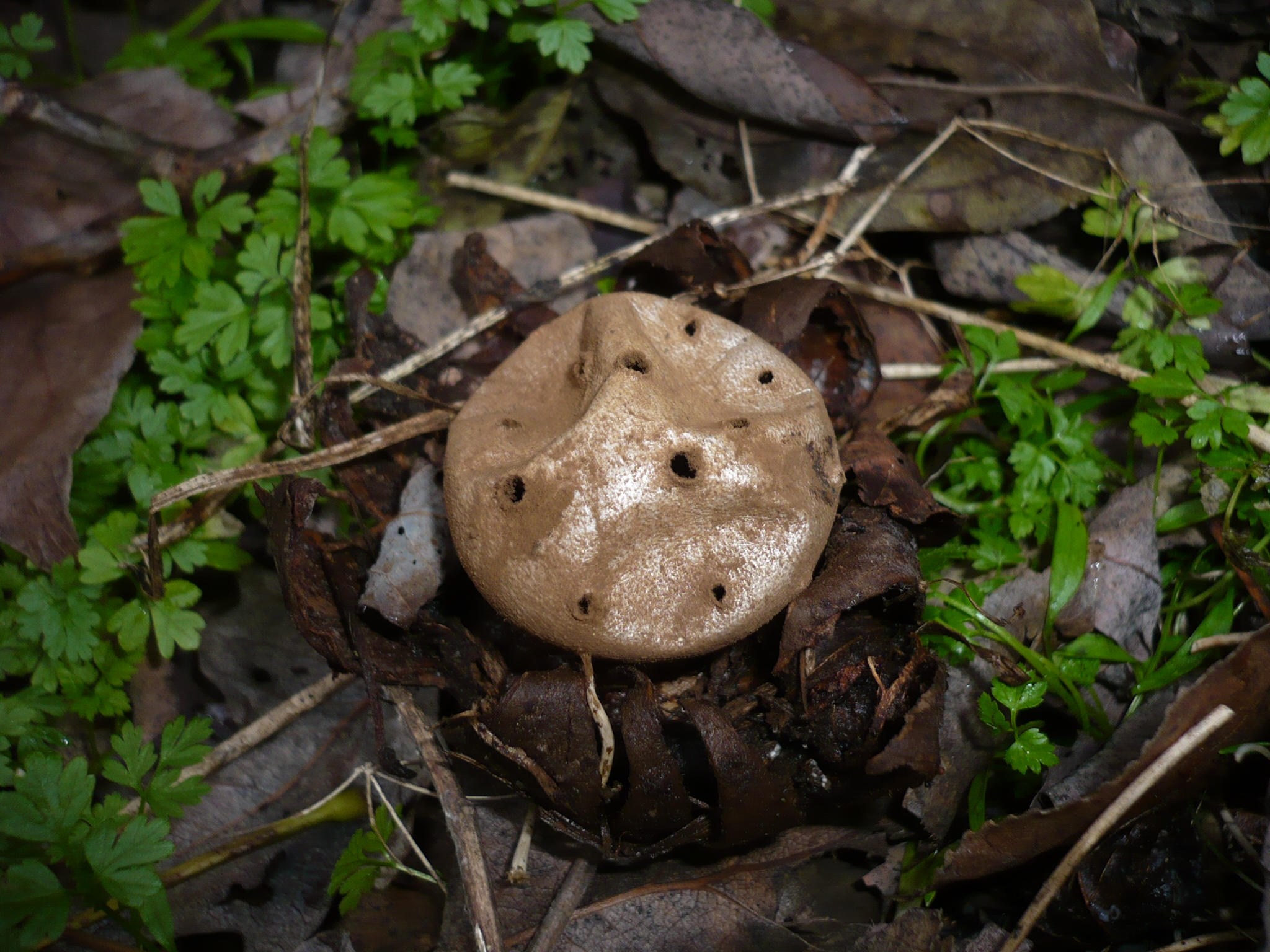
Brown spores can be seen on the surface of this fruit body.

The fruit bodies start their development underground or buried in leaf debris, linked to a strand of mycelium at the base. As they mature, the exoperidium (the outer tissue layer of the peridium) splits open into 7 to 14 rays which curve backward; this pushes the fruit body above the substrate. Fully opened specimens can reach dimensions of 2–12 cm (0.8–4.7 in) from ray tip to tip. The rays are of unequal size, with tips that often roll back inward. They comprise three distinct layers of tissue. The inner pseudoparenchymatous layer (so named for the resemblance to the tightly packed cells of plant parenchyma) is fleshy and thick when fresh, and initially pale beige but darkening to yellow or brown as it matures, often cracking and peeling off in the process. The exterior mycelial layer, often matted with fine leaf debris or dirt, usually cracks to reveal a middle fibrous layer, which is made of densely packed hyphae 1–2.5 μm wide. The base of the fruit body is concave to vaulted and often covered with adhering dirt. The roughly spherical spore sac (endoperidium) measures 1–5 cm (0.4–2.0 in) in diameter, and is supported by a cluster of short columns shaped like flattened spheres. It is grey-brown and minutely roughened with small (under 0.1 mm high), lightly interconnected warts. There are several to many evenly dispersed mouths, the ostioles, mainly on the upper half of the endoperidium. They are roughly circular with fimbriate edges. The inedible fruit bodies have no distinct taste, although dried specimens develop an odour resembling curry powder or bouillon cubes.

Like earthstars, the fungus uses the force of falling raindrops to help disperse the spores, which are ejected in little bursts when objects (such as rain) strike the outer wall of the spore sac. The gleba is brown to greyish-brown, with a cotton-like texture that, when compressed, allows the endoperidium to flex quickly and create a puff of air that is forced out through the ostioles. This generates a cloud of spores that can then be carried by the wind. There are columellae (sterile structures that start at the base of the gleba and extend through it), which are usually not evident in the mature gleba, but apparent at the base of the spore sac. The columellae are not connected to the ostioles, but rather, terminate within the gleba at some distance from them. The capillitia (sterile strands within the gleba) are long, slender, free, tapering, unbranched, and 3.3–4 μm thick, with thickened walls. The spores are spherical, nonamyloid, and are ornamented with irregularly shaped flaring protuberances up to 1.6 μm high. They measure 6.1–8.0 μm including the ornamentation.

=== Similar species ===
In Europe, M. coliforme is a distinctive species easily characterized by the multiple openings on its spore sac and the multiple stalks supporting the sac. Historically, it was thought that the holes might have been a result of insects. This was discussed and rejected by Thomas Jenkinson Woodward in 1797:

It has been doubted whether these mouths might not be accidental, and formed by insects after the expansion of the plant. But this (not to mention their regularity, and that each is furrowed by its border of cilia) is clearly disproved, from the marks of the projections formed by the mouths being seen on the expanded rays, when freshly opened ... I have likewise found an abortive plant, in which the seed did not ripen; but which had numerous projecting papillae on the head, where the mouths should have been formed.

In North America, a second species, M. calongei, is known from New Mexico. It can be distinguished by its more distinctly verrucose (finely warted) endoperidium, with warts more than 0.1 mm high.

== Habitat and distribution ==
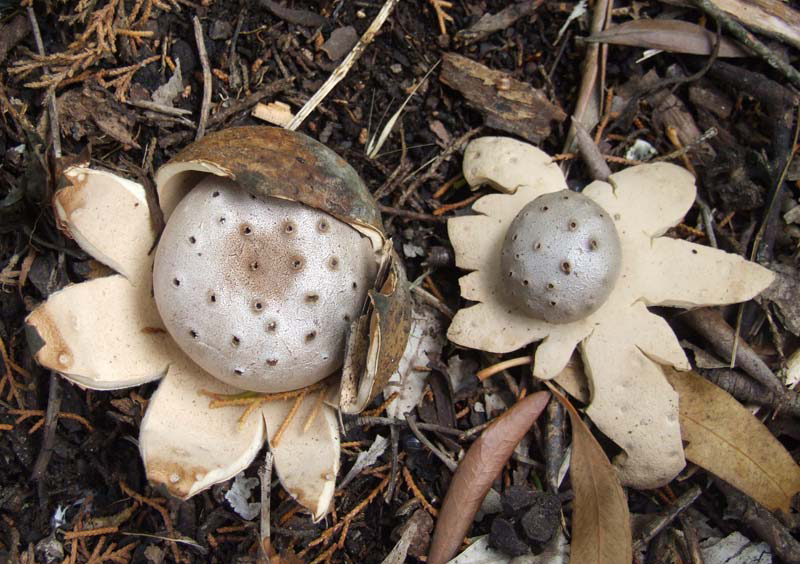
Myriostoma coliforme is a saprotrophic species.

Myriostoma coliforme is saprotrophic, deriving nutrients from decomposing organic matter. Fruit bodies grow grouped in well-drained or sandy soil, often in the partial shade of trees. The species occurs in deciduous forests and mixed forests, gardens, along hedges and grassy road banks, and grazed grasslands. It tends to grow on well-drained south-facing slopes. In Europe, its major habitat is riparian mixed forests dominated by Salix alba and Populus alba along the great rivers. In Hawaii, it has been collected at elevations above 2,000 m (6,600 ft) where it appears to favour the mamane (Sophora chrysophylla) forest.

The species is widespread in north temperate regions. (Note: European countries and territories in which M. coliforme has been recorded include Bulgaria, the Channel Islands, England, France, Germany, Italy, the Netherlands, Poland, Portugal, Slovakia, Spain, Turkey, and Ukraine. It has also been found in the Canary Islands and Morocco (in the Mamora forest). In North America the fungus was first reported from Colorado by Charles Horton Peck and later from Florida, collected by Lucien Underwood in 1891; both findings were reported by Andrew Price Morgan in April 1892. In 1897, Melville Thurston Cook also reported having collected it the year before from "Albino Beach". In the Middle East, it has been reported from Afghanistan, Israel, and Iran. It has also been reported from China and India.) It is rare in Europe, where it appears on the Regional Red Lists of 12 countries, and is one of 33 candidate species for listing in Appendix I of the Convention on the Conservation of European Wildlife and Natural Habitats (the "Bern Convention"). Although originally described from England, it was considered extinct in mainland Britain until it was found again in Suffolk in 2006 near Ipswich, one of its original localities; it had been last reported in the country in 1880. The fungus is considered extinct in Switzerland. Its most northerly location is southern Sweden, although it is generally rare in northern Europe. It is similarly widespread but rarely encountered in North America, although there may be isolated localities, like New Mexico, where it is more abundant.

Until 2017, M. coliforme was thought to be the only species in the genus Myriostoma, with a worldwide distribution. Since then molecular research, based on cladistic analysis of DNA sequences, has revealed at least five additional species in Central and South America, South Africa, and Australia. As a result the distribution of M. coliforme sensu stricto is uncertain, but it appears to be restricted to the Northern Hemisphere.
