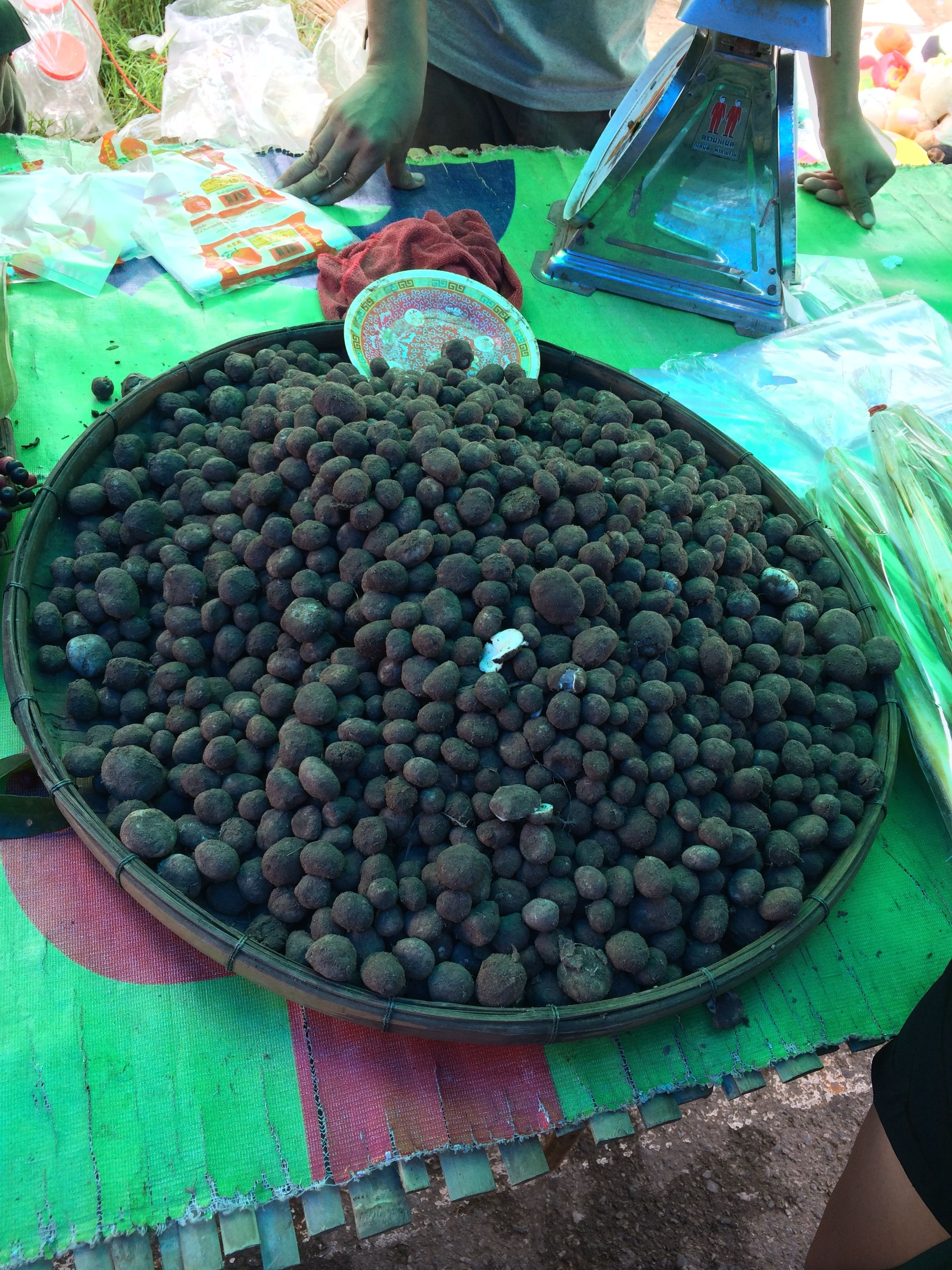
- Het pho เห็ดเผาะ Astraeus asiaticus in Sakon Nakhon, northeast of Thailand

Scientific classification
- Kingdom: Fungi
- Division: Basidiomycota
- Class: Agaricomycetes
- Order: Boletales
- Family: Diplocystaceae
- Genus: Astraeus
- Species: A. asiaticus

Binomial name
- Astraeus asiaticus Phosri, M.P.Martín & Watling (2007)

= Astraeus asiaticus =

Species of fungus

Astraeus asiaticus
- Mycological characteristics
- Glebal hymenium
- No distinct cap
- Hymenium attachment is not applicable
- Lacks a stipe
- Spore print is brown
- Ecology is mycorrhizal
- Edibility is inedible

Astraeus asiaticus is a species of false earthstar in the family Diplocystaceae. Described as a new species in 2007, it was originally found in north and northeastern areas of Thailand, where it grows in sandy or laterite-rich soil in dry lowland dipterocarp forests. The species has a wide distribution in Asia.

Anti-cancer Properties: This mushroom found in the forests of Bankura and Birbhum districts of West Bengal in India has been found to contain chemicals that fights against cancer. According to an article published in the science journal Nature, ‘kurkure chhatu’ (astraeus asiaticus), a wild edible mushroom commonly found in these regions, contains powerful bioactive compounds that can kill cancer cells while sparing the healthy ones.

Researchers at the cancer research unit at Post-Graduate Department of Ramakrishna Mission Vivekananda Centenary College, Kolkata have discovered potent anticancer and antioxidant properties in astraeus asiaticus. The extracts from the mushroom which is consumed by locals for its unique taste can significantly destroy cancer cells, particularly in cases of cervical, breast and lung cancers and prevent the growth of cancerous tumours leaving normal cells unharmed.

== See also ==
- Astraeus odoratus
