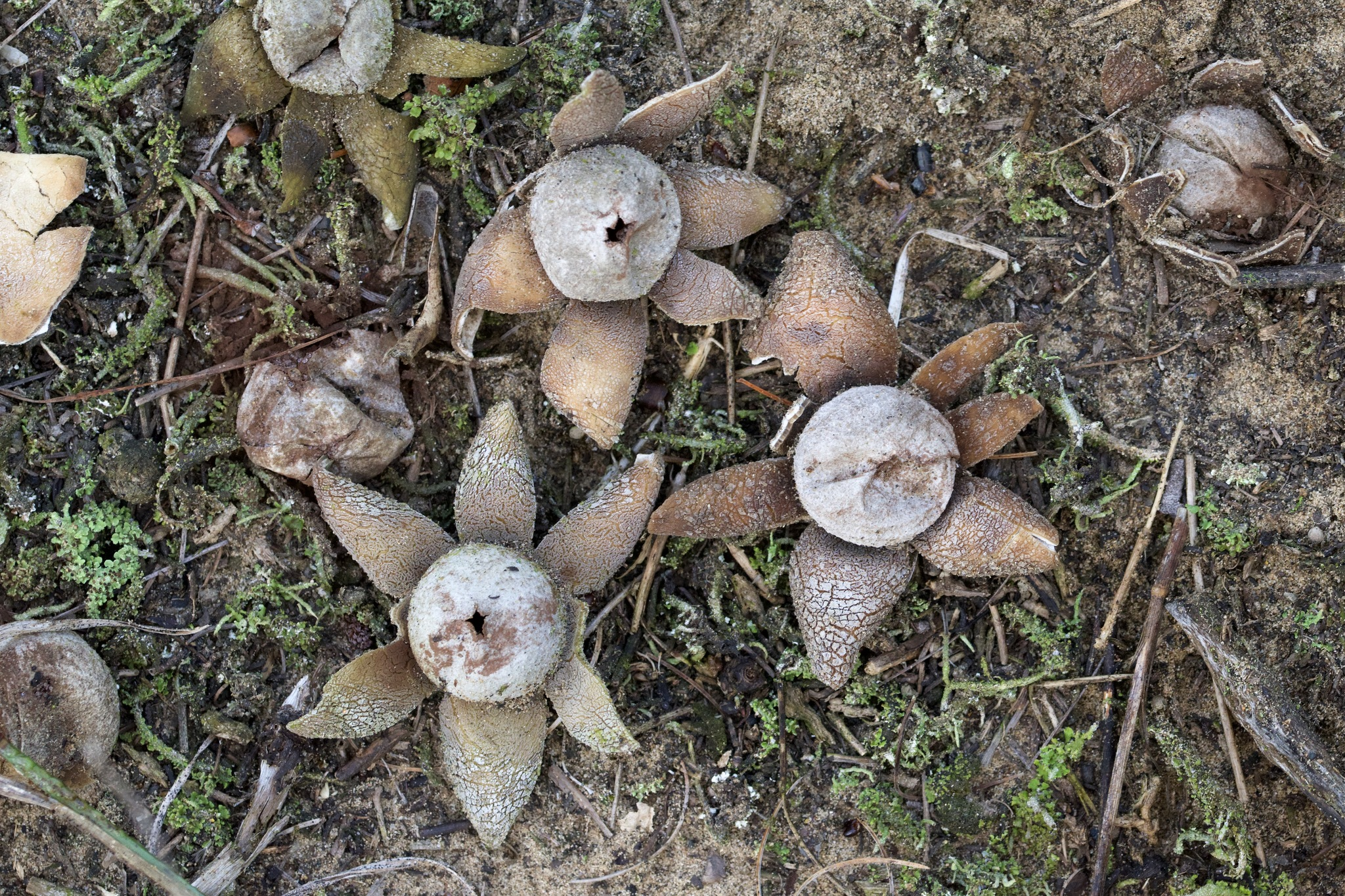
- Astraeus smithii

Scientific classification
- Domain: Eukaryota
- Kingdom: Fungi
- Division: Basidiomycota
- Class: Agaricomycetes
- Order: Boletales
- Family: Diplocystaceae
- Genus: Astraeus
- Species: A. smithii

Binomial name
- Astraeus smithii Watling, M.P.Martín & Phosri (2013)

= Astraeus smithii =

Species of fungus

Astraeus smithii is a species of false earthstar in the family Diplocystaceae. It was described as new to science in 2013. The specific epithet honors American mycologist Alexander H. Smith. The fungus is found in the central and northern United States, where it grows on the ground at forest edges and open areas.
