= Ostiole =

Small hole in algae, fungi or plants

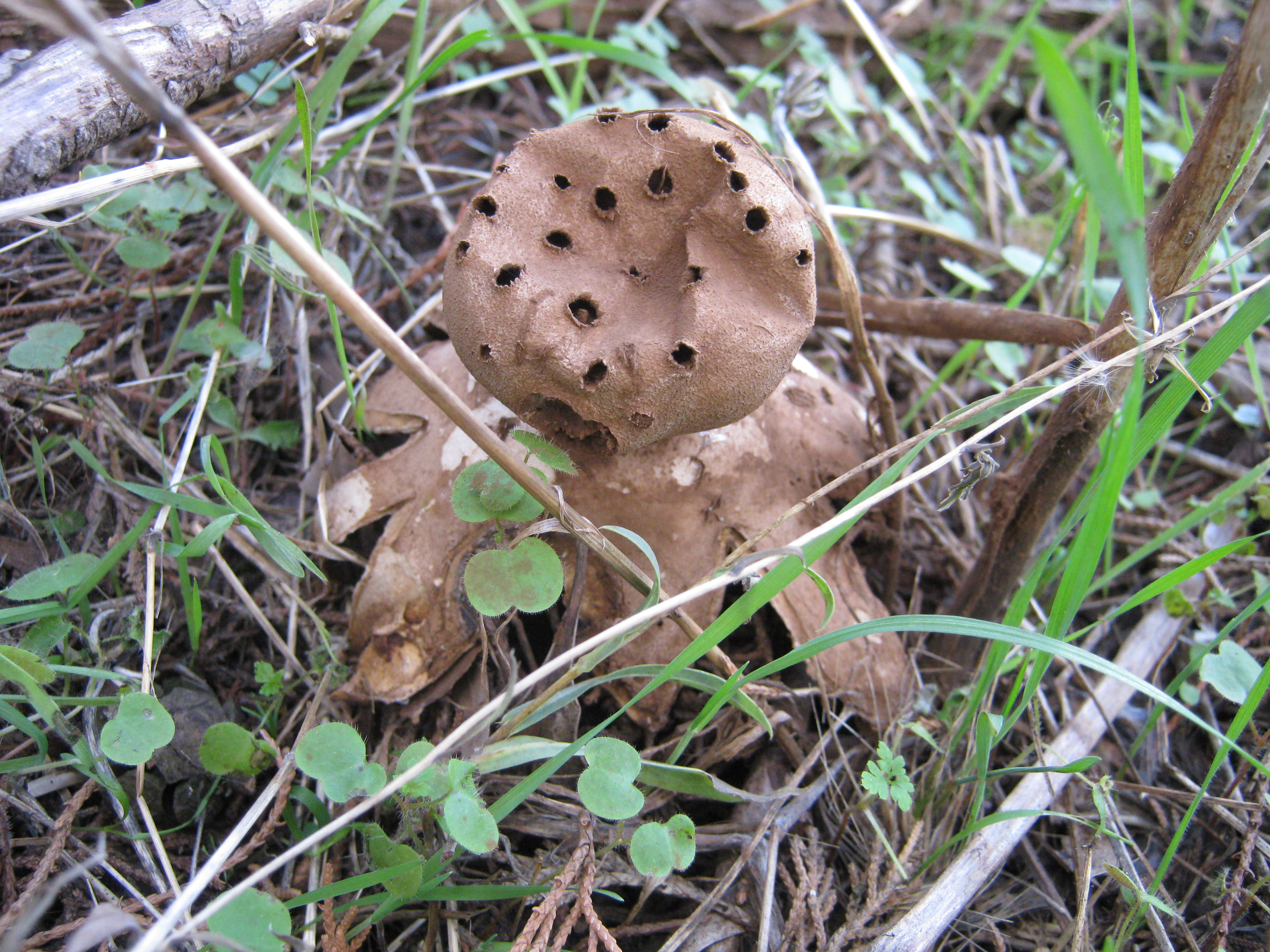
The earthstar fungus Myriostoma coliforme has multiple ostioles through which spores are released.

An ostiole is a small hole or opening through which algae or fungi release their mature spores.

The word is a diminutive of "ostium", "opening".

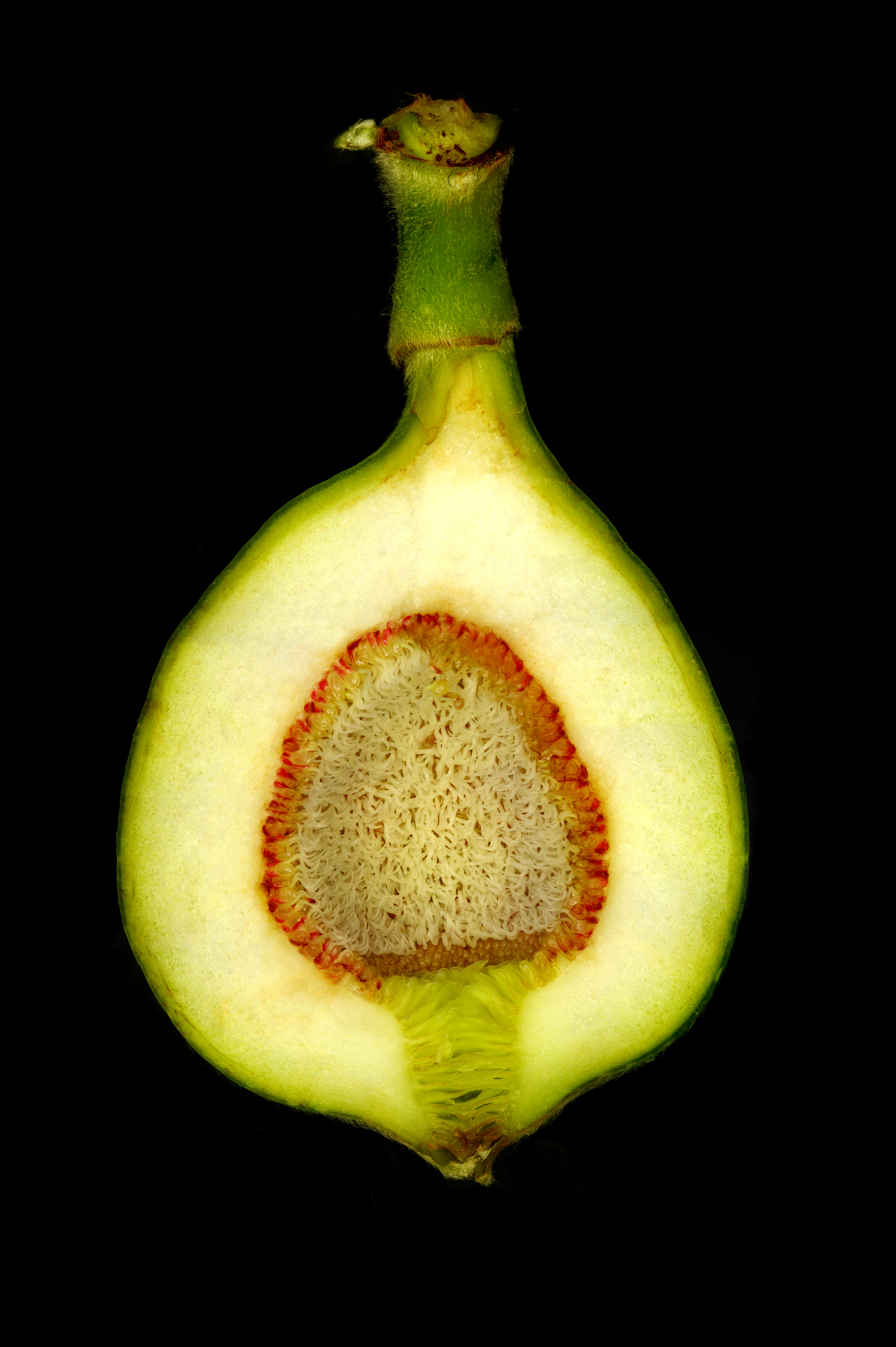
Cross-section of the syconium of a female creeping fig. The green, bract-lined ostiole at the bottom admits wasp pollinators.

The term is also used in higher plants, for example to denote the opening of the involuted syconium (fig inflorescence) through which fig wasps enter to pollinate and breed. The species pharamacosycea have an arrangement interlocking pattern but there is an exception because of insipdia because it is partly cover the ostiole. On the adaxial side of the bracts is made out of cubic cells, that has a staining reactions and contain phenolic compounds.

Sometimes a stomatal aperture is called an "ostiole".

== See also ==
- Ostium (disambiguation)
