= Andrew Price Morgan =

American botanist and mycologist (1836–1907)

- Born: October 27, 1836; Centerville, Ohio, USA
- Died: October 19, 1907 (aged 70); Preston, Ohio, USA
- Known for: Contributions to understanding the flora of Ohio
- Scientific career
- Fields: Botany, bryology, mycology
- Author abbrev. (botany): Morgan

Andrew Price Morgan (27 October 1836 – 19 October 1907) was an American botanist and mycologist. He investigated the flora of the Miami Valley in Ohio. While his interest included flowering plants, as noted by his Flora of the Miami Valley, Ohio, his special interest was in fungi. Morgan worked as a teacher in Dayton. He studied the botany of the Great Miami River, publishing in 1878 the Flora of the Miami River, Ohio; Morgan also showed particular interest in mycology and bryology. A.P. Morgan was a mentor to the prominent American mycologist Curtis Gates Lloyd. His correspondence with Lloyd is stored in the Lloyd Library and Museum in Cincinnati. Lloyd's portion of the correspondence is stored in the Ada Hayden Herbarium at Iowa state university. Morgan's collections of preserved fungi can also be found at the Ada Hayden Herbarium along with Laura Morgan's gouache illustrations of fungi that could not be preserved.

== Family ==
Morgan married scientific illustrator and collector Laura Matilda Vail in 1870.

== Taxa described ==
- Astraeus Morgan (1889)
- Bovistella Morgan (1892)
- Marasmius delectans Morgan (1905)
- Pyrenomyxa Morgan (1896)

== Eponymous taxa ==
Several fungal species have been named in Morgan's honor:

- Agaricus morganii Peck 1879
- Boletus morgani Peck 1883 (now Heimioporus betula)
- Cantharellus morgani Peck (now Hygrophoropsis morganii)
- Geastrum morganii Lloyd 1902
- Hypoxylon morganii Ellis & Everh. 1892
- Polyporus morgani Frost
- Lepiota morgani Peck 1887 (now Chlorophyllum molybdites)
- Marasmius morganianus Sumst. 1914
- Morganella Zeller 1948
- Peziza morganii Massee 1902
- Physospora morganii Sacc. & Traverso 1911
- Polyporus morganii Frost 1879 (now Polyporus radicatus)
- Russula morganii Sacc. 1887
- Stemonitis morganii Peck 1880
- Steccherinum morganii Banker 1906 (now Steccherinum reniforme)
- Trametes morganii Lloyd 1919
- Xylaria morganii Lloyd 1924

In honor of his wife, Morgan named Hygrophorus laurae.

== Publications ==
- Morgan, A.P. (1878). Flora of the Miami Valley, Ohio. The literary union.
- Morgan, A.P. (1884) "The North American Geasters" in American Naturalist 18:(10) 963–970
- Morgan, A.P. (1887) "North American Agarics. -- The sub-genus Amanita" in Journal of Mycology 3:(3) 25–33
- Morgan, A.P. (1889) "North American Fungi. The Gasteromycetes: 1." in Journal of the Cincinnati Society of Natural History 11: 141–149
- Morgan, A.P. (1890). North American fungi. Third paper. The Gastromycetes. Order II. Lycoperdaceae (continued). Journal of the Cincinnati Society of Natural History 12 (4): 8, 163–168.
- Morgan, A.P. (1892). Two new genera of hyphomycetes. Botanical Gazette 17: 190–192.
- Morgan, A.P. (1892). North American helicosporae. Journal of the Cincinnati Society of Natural History 15: 39–52.
- Morgan, A.P. (1892, publ. 1893). The myxomycetes of Miami Valley, Ohio. I. Journal of the Cincinnati Society of Natural History 15: 127–143.
- Morgan, A.P. (1894). The myxomycetes of Miami Valley, Ohio. III. Journal of the Cincinnati Society of Natural History 16: 127–156.
- Morgan, A.P. (1895). New North American fungi. Journal of the Cincinnati Society of Natural History 18: 36–45.
- Morgan, A.P. (1896). The myxomycetes of Miami Valley, Ohio. IV. Journal of the Cincinnati Society of Natural History 19: 1-44.
- Morgan, A.P. (1902). The discomycetes of the Miami Valley, Ohio. Journal of Mycology 8: 179–192.
- Morgan, A.P. (1906). North American species of Heliomyces. Journal of Mycology 12: 92–95.
- Morgan, A.P. (1906). North American species of Lepiota. Journal of Mycology 12: 154–159, 195–203, 242–248.
