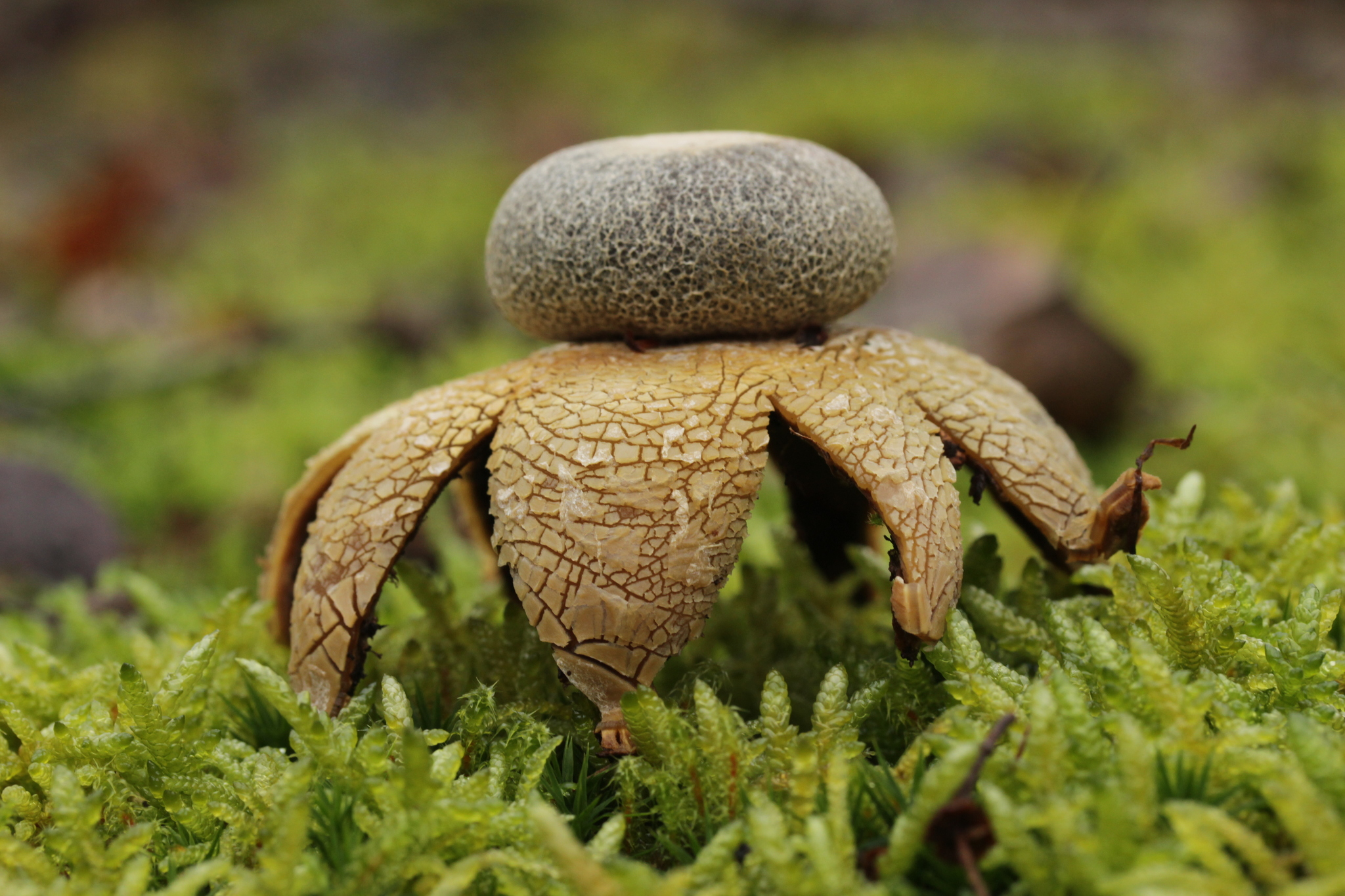
- Astraeus hygrometricus

Scientific classification
- Kingdom: Fungi
- Division: Basidiomycota
- Class: Agaricomycetes
- Order: Boletales
- Suborder: Sclerodermatineae
- Family: Diplocystaceae; Kreisel (1974)

Genera
- Astraeus; Diplocystis; Endogonopsis; Tremellogaster

Synonyms
- Astraeaceae Zeller ex Jülich (1982)

= Diplocystaceae =

Family of fungi

The Diplocystaceae (alternatively spelled Diplocystidaceae or Diplocystidiaceae) are a family of fungi in the Boletales order. The family was described by mycologist Hanns Kreisel in 1974.
