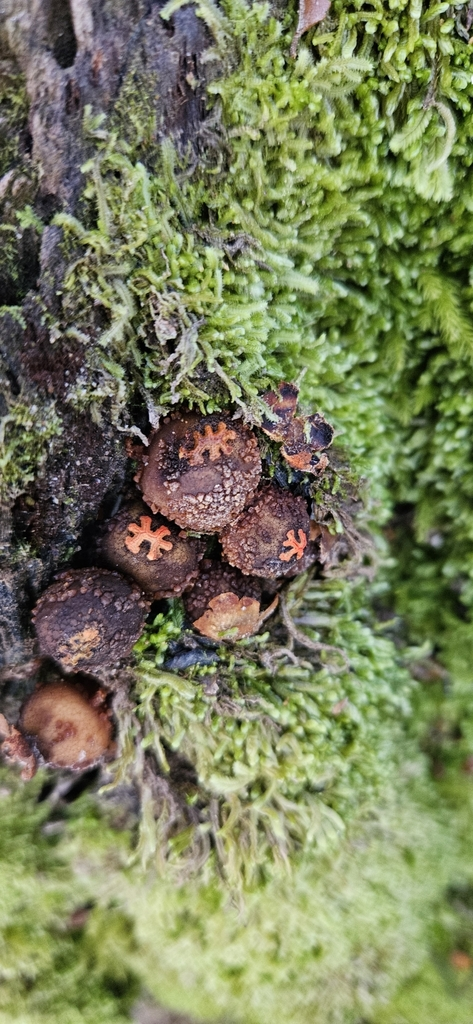

Scientific classification
- Kingdom: Fungi
- Division: Basidiomycota
- Class: Agaricomycetes
- Order: Boletales
- Family: Sclerodermataceae
- Genus: Calostoma
- Species: C. rodwayi

Binomial name
- Calostoma rodwayi (Lloyd) Lloyd

= Calostoma rodwayi =

Species of fungus

Calostoma rodwayi, or forest prettymouth, is a species of ectomycorrhizal fungus in the family Sclerodermataceae, order Boletales.

== Taxonomy ==
This species was first published by C. G. Lloyd in 1925 in his mycological notes, describing it from a specimen sent from New Zealand by Prof. L. Rodway. When Calostoma rodwayi was first described by Lloyd's, the genus Mitremyces was used for Calostoma fuscum and Calostoma junghuhnii and so Lloyd used Mitremyces. Those three species are now assigned to Calostoma.

== Description ==
Calostoma rodwayi is a truffle-like fungus with a black spore-bearing head (gasterocarp) with a rough scaly appearance. There is a gelatinous outer skin (peridium) on the head that dries and breaks to produce the scaly appearance and show the peristome. The peristome is star-shaped on the top of the head and is a bright red/orange with the appearance of "lips", that covers an opening that spores may come out from. The stalk is a darker orange colour that raises the head above the substrate.The biggest spores measure 16 microns and they are globose and perfectly smooth.

== Habitat and distribution ==
Calostoma rodwayi grows in Nothofagus forests on the soil around the beech trees. C. rodwayi can be found mostly throughout the west coast of South Island of New Zealand and bottom of North Island with scatterings elsewhere. C. rodwayi can also be found in the southeast of Australia and throughout Tasmania.

== Etymology ==
Lloyd named this species after the researcher who collected the sample, Prof. L. Rodway, Tasmania.
