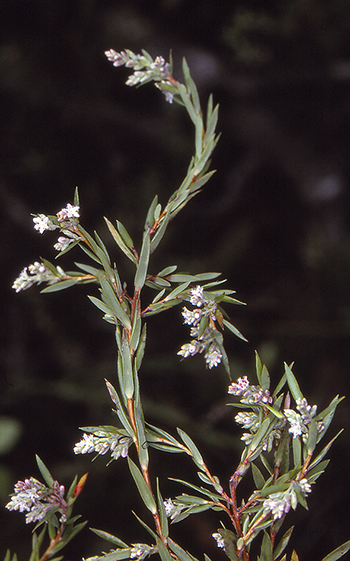
- In Booderee National Park

Scientific classification
- Kingdom: Plantae
- Clade: Tracheophytes
- Clade: Angiosperms
- Clade: Eudicots
- Clade: Asterids
- Order: Ericales
- Family: Ericaceae
- Genus: Leucopogon
- Species: L. rodwayi

Binomial name
- Leucopogon rodwayi Summerh.
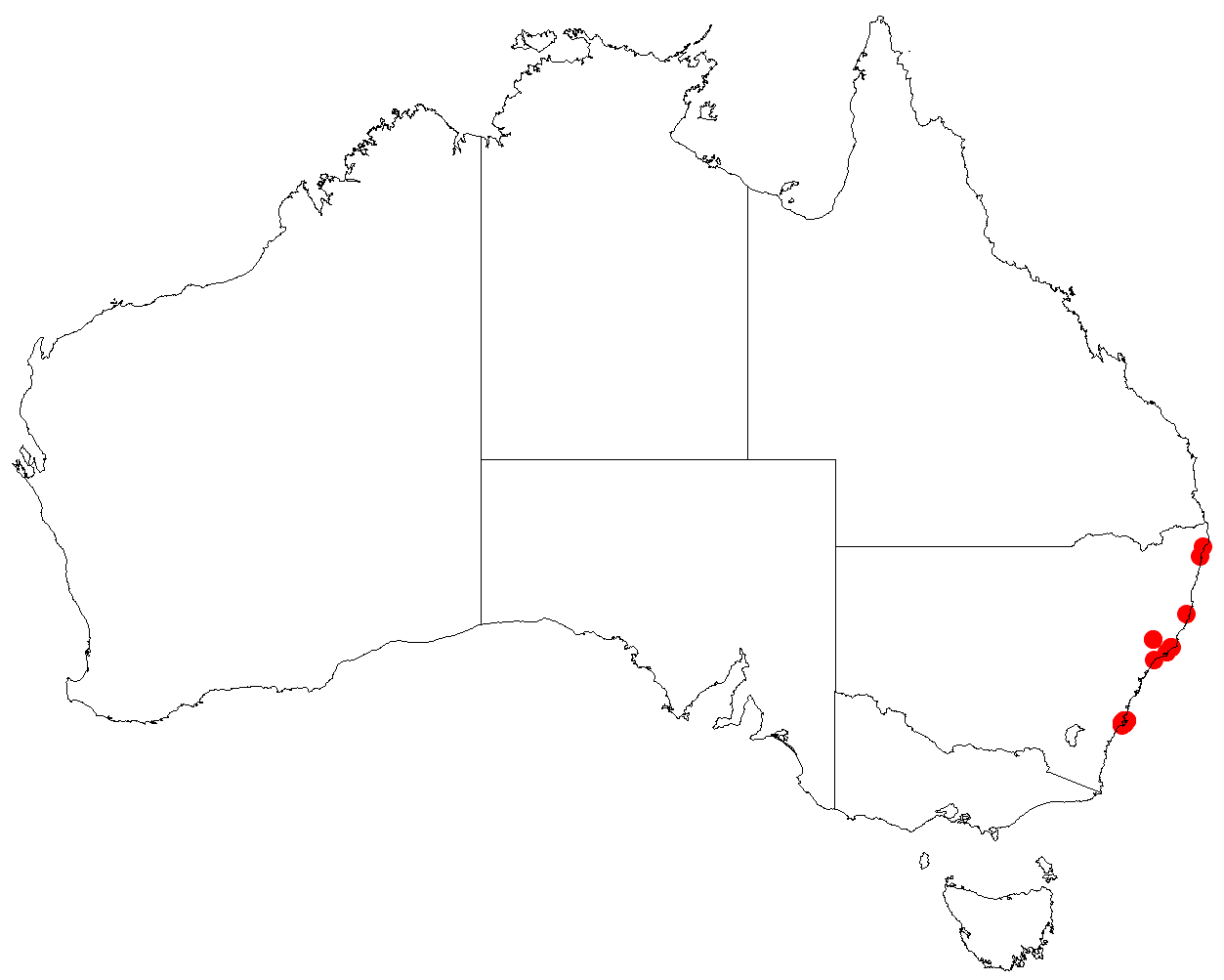
- Occurrence data from AVH

Synonyms
- Styphelia rodwayi (Summerh.) Sleumer

= Leucopogon rodwayi =

Species of plant

Leucopogon rodwayi is a species of flowering plant in the heath family Ericaceae and is endemic to coastal New South Wales. It is an erect to spreading shrub with narrowly egg-shaped to elliptic leaves, and pendent, white, tube-shaped flowers arranged in groups of 6 to 15 in leaf axils, forming a spike up to 8 mm (0.31 in) long.

== Description ==
Leucopogon rodwayi is an erect to spreading shrub that typically grows to a height of 25–80 cm (9.8–31.5 in), its young branchlets covered with a few soft hairs. The leaves are narrowly egg-shaped to elliptic, 3.8–10.5 mm (0.15–0.41 in) long and 0.9–1.9 mm (0.035–0.075 in) wide on a petiole up to 1 mm (0.039 in) long. Both sides of the leaves are glabrous, the edges are turned down, and there are a few small teeth on the edges. The flowers are borne in spikes of 6 to 15 up to 8 mm (0.31 in) long in leaf axils with bracteoles 0.8–1 mm (0.031–0.039 in) long at the base. The sepals are 1.0–1.35 mm (0.039–0.053 in) long, the petals white and joined at the base, forming a tube 0.6–0.8 mm (0.024–0.031 in) long, the lobes 0.6–0.9 mm (0.024–0.035 in) long. Flowering occurs from February to October, with a peak in August and September, and the fruit is about 2.3 mm (0.091 in) long and glabrous.

== Taxonomy ==
Leucopogon rodwayi was first formally described in 1926 by Victor Summerhayes in the Bulletin of Miscellaneous Information, Royal Gardens, Kew from specimens collected by Frederick Rodway near Jervis Bay in 1925.

== Distribution ==
Leucopogon rodwayi grows in sand in coastal heath on ridges and rock platforms from Broadwater to Myall Lakes and at Jervis Bay in eastern New South Wales.
