= Boletocrocin =

General structure. If R = OH (aspartic acid), boletocrocin A; R = NH_{2} (asparagine), boletocrocin B.

Boletocrocin is any one of a group of seven closely related organic compounds, individually named boletocrocin A through boletrocrocin G. These compounds are polyene dicarboxylic acids that include both lipophilic and polar amino acids. They were extracted from the brightly colored mushrooms Boletus laetissimus and B. rufoaureus. The boletocrocins' conjugated systems account for the intense color.

Related biological pigments are present in other fungi, such as calostomal (from Calostoma cinnabarinum), melanocrocin (from Melanogaster broomeianus), and mycenaaruin A (from Mycena aurantiomarginata).
