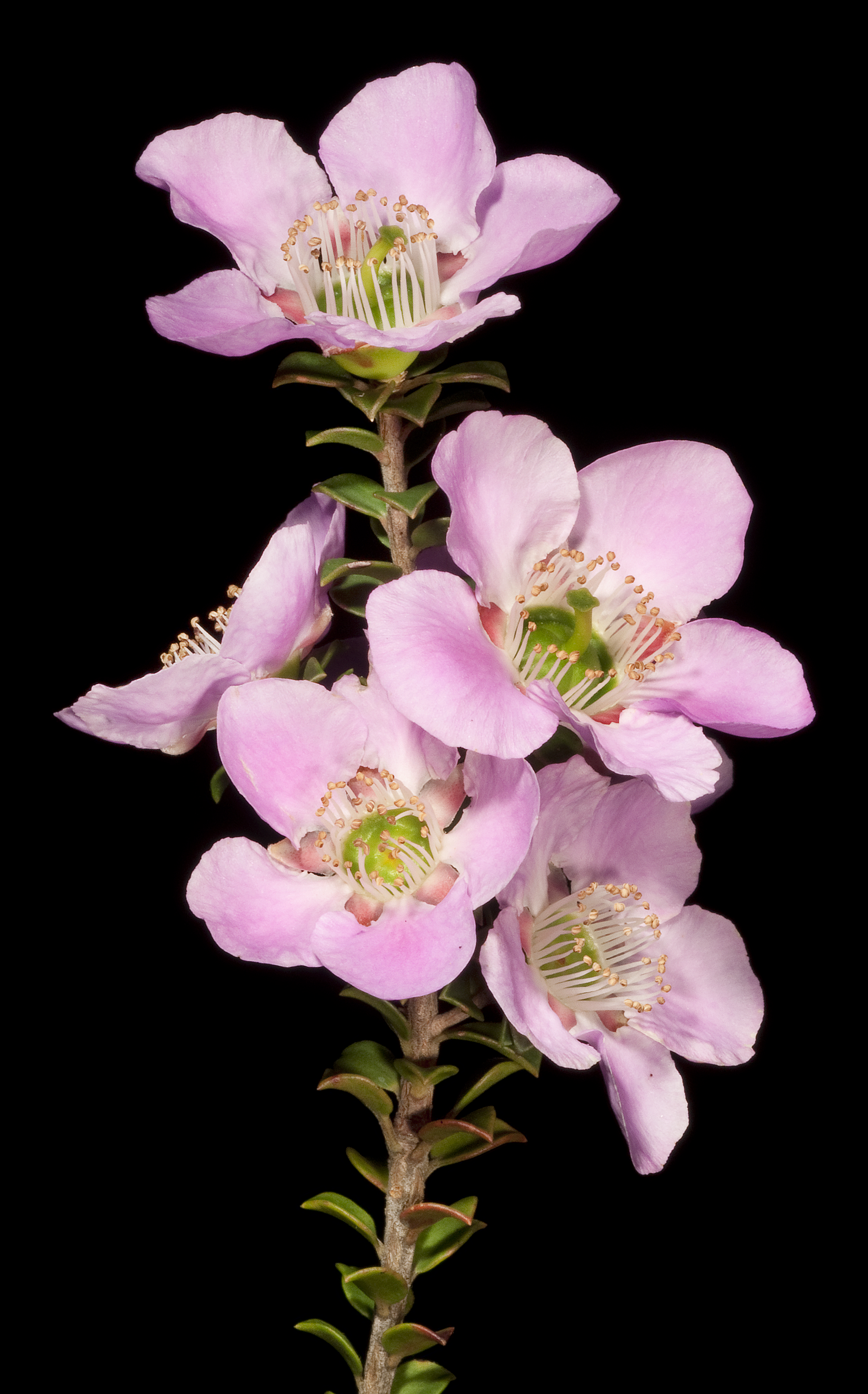
- Leptospermum rotundifolium

Scientific classification
- Kingdom: Plantae
- Clade: Tracheophytes
- Clade: Angiosperms
- Clade: Eudicots
- Clade: Rosids
- Order: Myrtales
- Family: Myrtaceae
- Genus: Leptospermum
- Species: L. rotundifolium

Binomial name
- Leptospermum rotundifolium (Maiden & Betche) F.A.Rodway

= Leptospermum rotundifolium =

Round leaf tea-tree

Species of tree

Leptospermum rotundifolium, commonly known as round-leaved tea tree, is a species of flowering plants in the family Myrtaceae and is endemic to New South Wales, naturalised in Victoria and Western Australia. It is an erect shrub with more or less circular leaves but with a small point on the tip, and relatively large pink or white flowers.

== Description ==
Leptospermum rotundifolium is an erect shrub that typically grows to a height of more than 2 m (6 ft 7 in). The bark on mature specimens is gnarled and slightly flaky. The leaves are thick, more or less circular with a small, blunt point on the tip, mostly 4–7 mm (0.16–0.28 in) long and wide on a petiole about 1 mm (0.039 in) long. They are smooth and slightly shiny and give off an aromatic perfume when bruised. The flowers are borne singly, 25–30 mm (0.98–1.18 in) in diameter and are sessile, the sepals 3–4 mm (0.12–0.16 in) long, the petals 8–12 mm (0.31–0.47 in) long and white or pink. Flowering occurs from October to December and the fruit are hemispherical and mostly 8–12 mm (0.31–0.47 in) in diameter.

== Taxonomy ==
This tea-tree was first formally described in 1900 by Joseph Maiden and Ernst Betche who gave it the name Leptospermum scoparium var. rotundifolium in the Proceedings of the Linnean Society of New South Wales from specimens collected south of the Shoalhaven River in 1900.

In 1919, Edwin Cheel published a paper in the Journal and Proceedings of the Royal Society of New South Wales crediting Frederick Arthur Rodway with raising the variety to species status as Leptospermum rotundifolium.

== Distribution and habitat ==
Leptospermum rotundifolium grows in rocky places in shrubby heath or forest from near Sydney to Nerriga in near-coastal areas of New South Wales. It has also been naturalised in a small area in the Shire of Manjimup in south-western Western Australia and was recorded once in eastern Victoria.
