= Calostoma fuhreri =

Scientific classification
- Domain: Eukaryota
- Kingdom: Fungi
- Division: Basidiomycota
- Class: Agaricomycetes
- Order: Boletales
- Family: Sclerodermataceae
- Genus: Calostoma
- Species: C. fuhreri

Binomial name
- Calostoma fuhreri Crichton & J.H.Willis (1986)

Species of fungus

Calostoma fuhreri is a species of gasteroid fungus in the family Sclerodermataceae. Found in Australia, the original specimens were collected by mycologist Bruce Fuhrer, for whom the species is named. Fruit bodies grow to 28 mm (1.1 in) tall, and comprise a pseudostipe that is 15–20 mm (0.6–0.8 in) long by 5–8 mm (0.2–0.3 in) thick and supports a roughly spherical peridium (spore sac). Atop the peridium is an irregular stoma (opening) that is red on the inside. Inside the peridium is a white gleba that consists of spores, basidia, and broken hyphae. The spores are oblong to elliptical, hyaline (translucent), and typically measure 20–26 by 9–11 μm.
