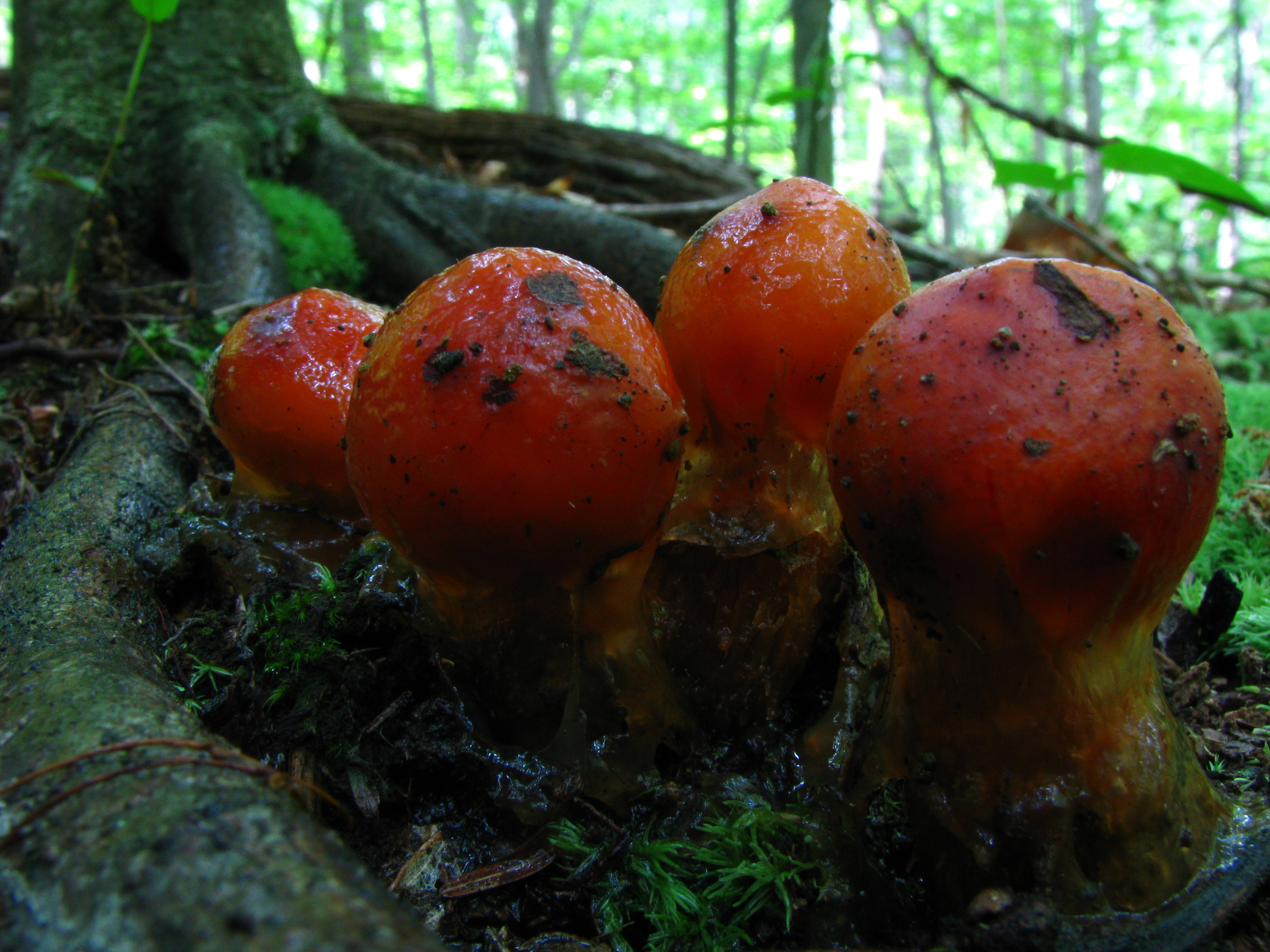
- Calostoma cinnabarinum

Scientific classification
- Kingdom: Fungi
- Division: Basidiomycota
- Class: Agaricomycetes
- Order: Boletales
- Family: Sclerodermataceae
- Genus: Calostoma; Desv. (1809)

Type species
- Calostoma cinnabarinum Corda (1809)

Synonyms
- Mitremyces Nees (1817); Gyropodium E.Hitchc. (1825); Husseia Berk. (1847)

= Calostoma =

Genus of fungi

Calostoma is a genus of 29 species of gasteroid fungi in the suborder Sclerodermatineae. Like other gasteroid fungi, Calostoma do not have the spore discharge mechanism associated with typical gilled fungi (ballistospory), and instead have enclosed spore-bearing structures. Resembling round puffballs with raised, brightly colored spore openings (ostioles), elevated on a thick, gelatinous stalks, species have been collected in regions of deciduous, temperate, tropical or subtropical forests. Their distribution includes eastern North America, Central America, Asia, and Australasia. The common name given to some species, "prettymouth", alludes to the brightly colored raised openings (ostioles) that may somewhat resemble lips. Other common names include "hotlips" and "puffball in aspic".

The unusual fruit body structure has historically led mycologists to suggest various classification schemes based on presumed relationships to other puffball or "stomach mushrooms". Phylogenetic analyses performed in the 2000s show the genus to be evolutionarily related to the Bolete mushrooms. Calostoma species are ectomycorrhizal, forming symbiotic associations with trees from various families. The type species, Calostoma cinnabarinum, is ectomycorrhizal with oak.

== Taxonomy ==
The original genus description, based on the type species Calostoma cinnabarinum (synonymous with cinnabarina), was published by French botanist Nicaise Auguste Desvaux in 1809. Before the advent of modern genetic analysis, the Calostoma was considered to be part of the Gasteromycetes, a grouping of fungi with enclosed spore-bearing structures. Specifically, it was classified in the order of stalked puffballs, although some mycologists have suggested that the genus Calostoma should be merged with Tulostoma (xerophilic stalked puffballs), Scleroderma (hard puffballs), Geastrum (earthstars), or Pseudocolus (stinkhorns). Some authors have placed Calostoma in its own family, the Calostomataceae.

In the 2000s, a phylogenetic analyses using nuclear and mitochondrial ribosomal gene sequences helped to clarify the phylogeny of Calostoma. Using the species C. cinnabarinum and C. ravenelli as representative examples, the research showed the genus to be evolutionarily part of the monophyletic Boletales clade, and separate from clades containing most of the gilled mushrooms, puffballs, stalked puffballs, earthstars, stinkhorns and non-bolete Gasteromycetes. Calostoma belongs to the suborder Sclerodermatineae within the Boletales. The suborder comprises the following genera: Boletinellus, Calostoma, Gyroporus, Phlebopus, Pisolithus, Scleroderma, and Veligaster. Calostoma is thought to have diverged evolutionarily from other Boletales taxa between 52 and 115 million years ago. The most recent age estimates suggest Calostoma diverged from the most recent common ancestor in the "Core Sclerodermatineae" at a median age of 66.02 million years ago (highest posterior density range 49.27-90.28 million years ago). The median age of the most recent common ancestor for extant Calostoma is 42.73 million years ago (highest posterior density range 28.76-57.15 million years ago).

The genus name Calostoma is derived from the Greek kallos or "beauty", and stoma (στóμα) or "mouth"; similarly, several species are referred to in the vernacular as "prettymouths". In Korea, it is called Yongi, or "red cheeks".

== Description ==
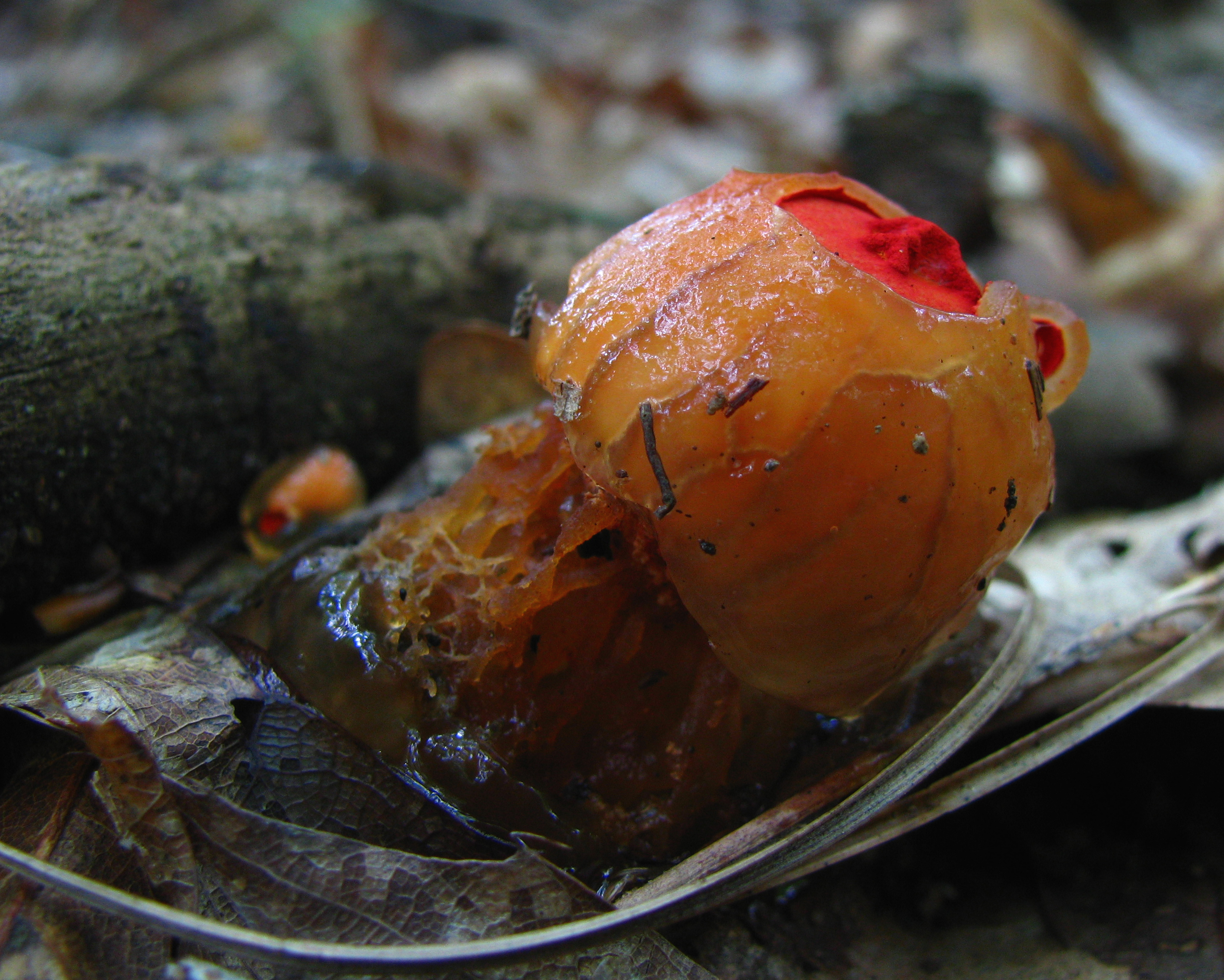
The outer tissue layer of Calostoma cinnabarinum (shown) is gelatinous.

Fruit bodies, technically known as gasterocarps, form spherical spore-bearing heads with a peridium (outer tissue layer) made of two to four clearly defined layers of tissue. The outermost peridial layer is a thick gelatinous or shiny cuticle, which during maturity peels away to reveal the brightly colored peristome that has a star-shaped pore through which spores may escape. The innermost layer of the peridium is papery and membranous, and remains attached to the outer layers only at the apex of the star-shaped apical pore or slit. The fruit bodies may either have no stalk (sessile), or be atop a stalk. The stalk, made of thick, intertwined and fused cords of hyphae, is hygroscopic, and will expand upon absorbing moisture. The spore mass in the head, the gleba, is pale, and initially has thick-walled skeletal hyphae called capillitia. Clamp connections are present in the fungal hyphae.

=== Spores ===
The spores are spherical to elliptical in shape, and typically have surfaces that are reticulate (with interconnected grooves resembling a net) or pitted. The variations in the elaborate pitted-spore reticulations have inspired investigation with techniques such as scanning electron microscopy and atomic force microscopy. The latter technique was used to distinguish subtle details (at the nanometer scale) and differences in the fine structure of the spores of various Calostoma species. The spore reticulations have purpose: they become entangled and interwoven with nurse cells and scaly hyphae, the net effect of which is to prevent the spores from being blown away simultaneously.

== Development ==
When grown in humid conditions, such as might typically be found in a temperate deciduous forest, Calostoma species develop a thicker, more gelatinous exoperidium (the outermost peridial layer). As the stalk expands, the exoperidium becomes sloughed off, exposing the endoperidium and a raised peristome—the ridge of tissue around the opening suggestive of the common name, "prettymouth". The exoperidium may help to protect the maturing gleba of late-fruiting species from harmful variations in temperature or humidity, or from insect predation.

== Habitat and distribution ==
The species in Calostoma have been collected in regions of deciduous, temperate, tropical or subtropical forests, containing tree species from the families Fagaceae, Nothofagaceae, Myrtaceae, and Dipterocarpaceae. The type species C. cinnabarinum was shown to form ectomycorrhizae with Quercus species, using isotopic labeling, molecular and morphological analyses. Southeast Asian Calostoma have also been described as ectomycorrhizal. Calostoma sarasinii forms ectomycorrhizae with species of Lithocarpus (Fagaceae) while Calostoma retisporum forms ectomycorrhizae with species from the Myrtaceae. The ectomycorrhizal mode of nutrition is predominant in the Sclerodermatineae suborder. Historically, it had been assumed to be saprobic, due to its taxonomic uncertainty, and presumed relatedness to other saprobic fungi like the stalked puffballs and the earthstars.

The distribution of the genus is limited to Australasia (Australia, New Zealand, Papua New Guinea), Southeast Asia, Asia, and North and Central America. Species have been described from Indonesia (Borneo, Java, Sumatra, New Guinea), Sri Lanka, Himalaya, Nepal, China, New Zealand, North America, and Latin America. Australian species include C. fuhreri, C. fuscum, C. insigne, C. rodwayi, and C. viride. David Arora mentions a preference for humid forests in eastern North America, particularly in the southern Appalachian Mountains.

== Uses ==
=== Edibility ===
In general, Calostoma species are not considered edible; because they typically begin their development underground, by the time fruit bodies appear they are too tough for consumption. However, a 2009 study reported that in the community of Tenango de Doria (Hidalgo state, Mexico), Calostoma cinnabarinum used to be collected by children and consumed "like a tidbit", although the tradition seems to have been abandoned in recent years. Locals called the young fruit bodies "yemitas"or “little yolks”.

=== Biochemistry ===
Calostoma cinnabarinum contains a pigment named calostomal that is responsible for its red color. The IUPAC name of this molecule is all-trans-16-oxohexadeca-2,4,6,8,10,12,14-heptaenoic acid.

== Species list ==
The following species list is compiled from Index Fungorum as well as species published in the literature, but missing in Fungorum, specifically C. formosanum, C. junghuhnii, and C. sarasinii. The name listed under the species binomial is the authority—the author of the original description of that species, followed by the year of publication.

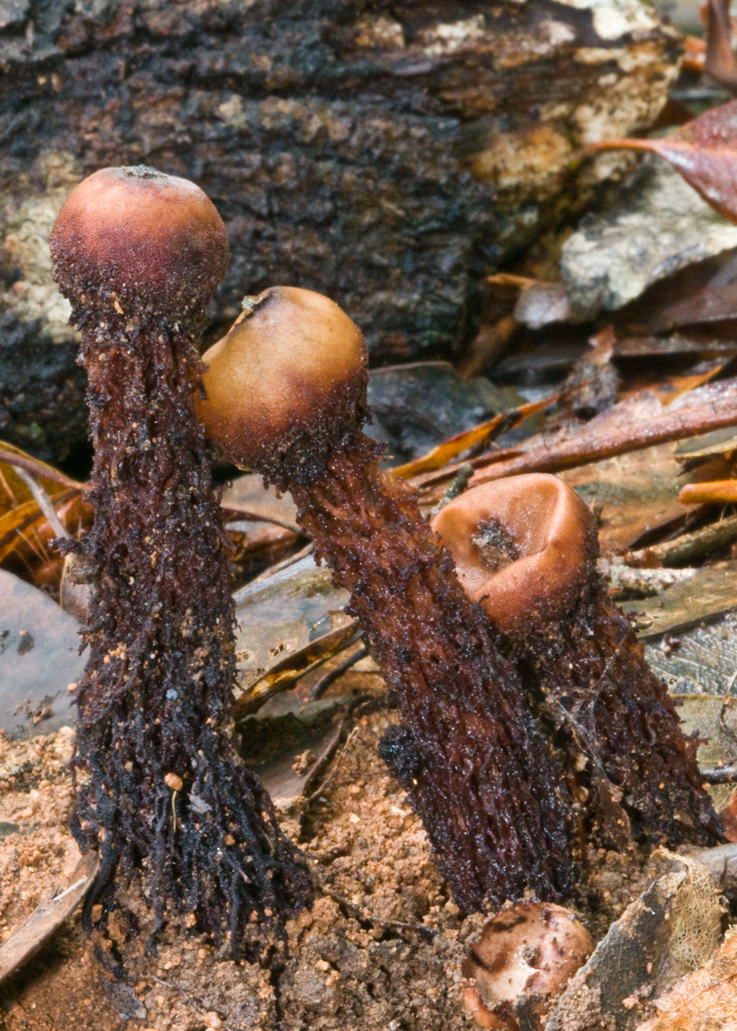
Calostoma fuscum

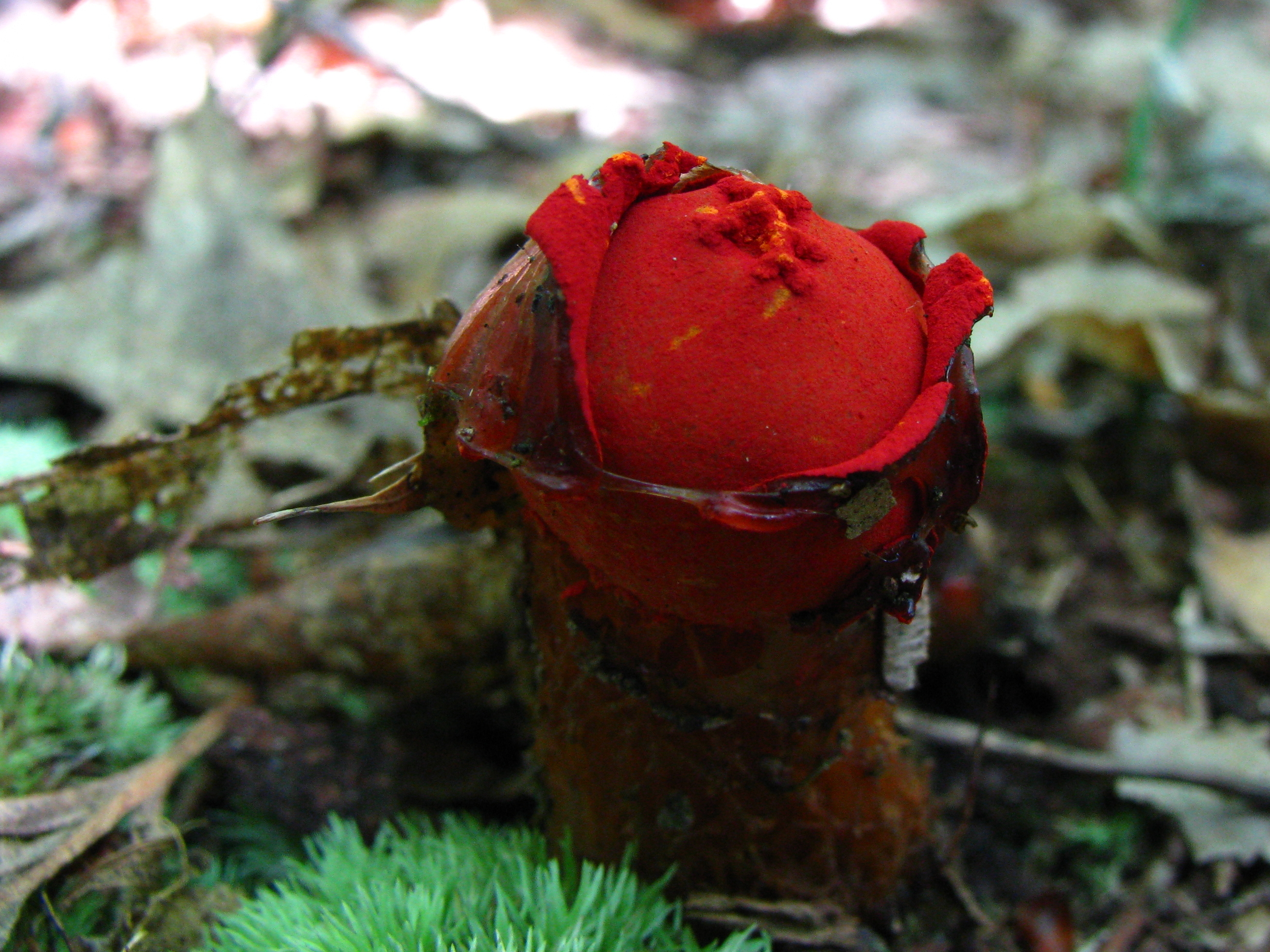
Calostoma cinnabarinum showing peristome and exposed gleba

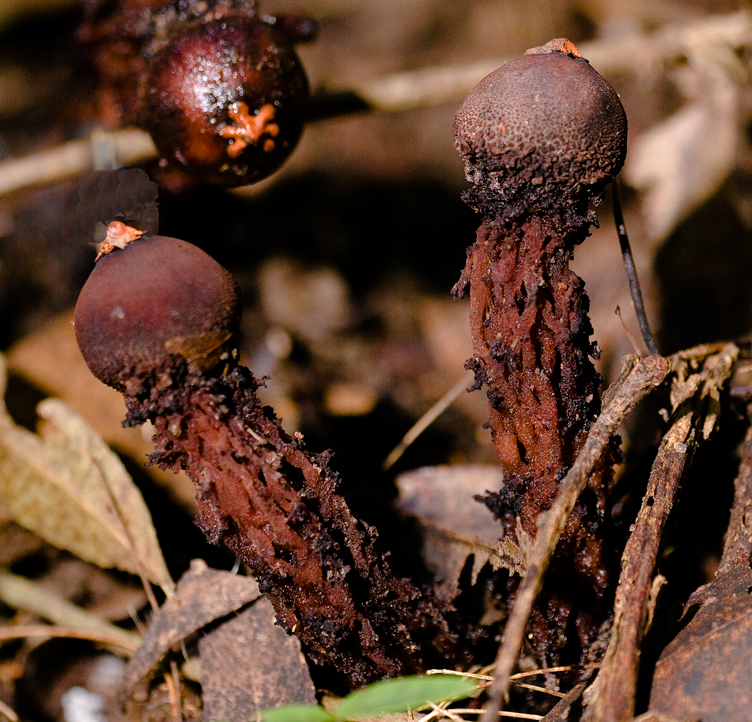
Calostoma species tentatively identified as C. rodwayi

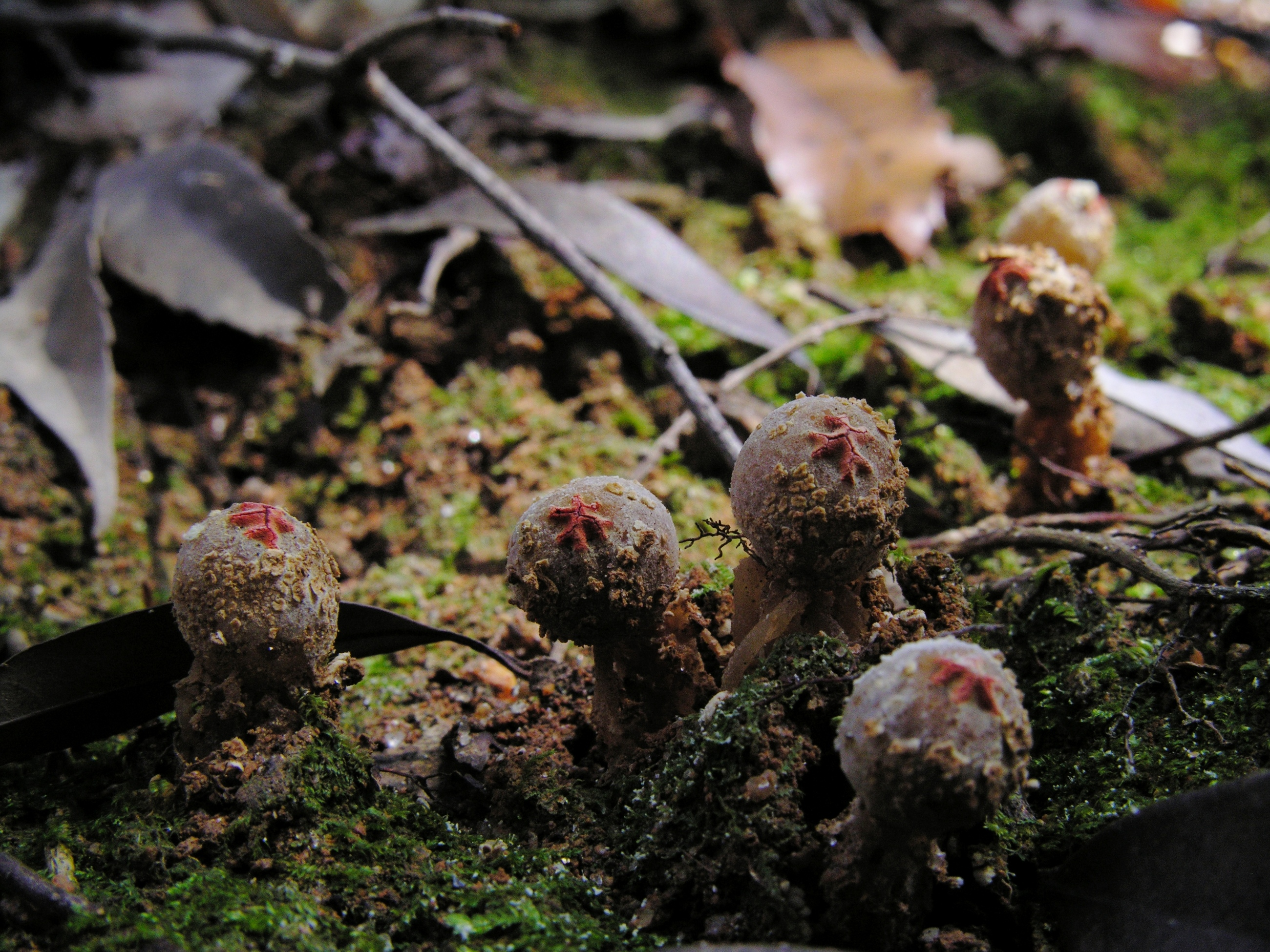
Calostoma japonica

Binomial Authority	Year	Distribution	Notes
C. aeruginosum Massee	1891		
C. berkeleyi Massee	1888	On the islands south of Sri Lanka	
C. brookei L. Fan & B. Liu	1995	In a Malaysian forest	
C. cinnabarinum Corda	1809	China, Colombia, Costa Rica, India, Mexico, Taiwan, and the United States	
C. formosanum Sawada	1931	Asia	This is a form of C. junghuhnii with a very short rooting stem.
C. fuhreri Crichton & J.H. Willis	1986	In damp depressions on sand ridges in Victoria, Australia	It has dark grey to brown fruit bodies made of a short gelatinous stalk, up to 2 cm (0.8 in) long, and a spherical head up to 0.8 cm (0.3 in) wide. The outer layer of the peridium does not fall off in one piece (as in C. fuscum) but persists as small black granules. The spores are elliptical, white, and smooth-walled, with dimensions of 22–25 by 10–11.5 μm.
C. fuscum (Berk.) Massee	1888	Tasmania and south Australia	
C. guizhouense B. Liu & S.Z. Jiang	1985	In a montane forest in Guizhou, China	
C. hunanense B. Liu & Y.B. Peng	1979	In the soil in the woods of Hunan, China	
C. insigne (Berk.) Massee	1888	Sri Lanka	
C. japonica Henn.	1902	Japan	
C. jiangii B. Liu & Yin H. Liu	1985	In a montane forest, in Guizhou, China	
C. junghuhnii (Schlect. & Müll.) Massee		Collected in the Himalayas, southeast Tibet and Bhutan, several times in Nepal, Japan, and Taiwan.	Originally described as Mitremyces junghuhnii by Schlechtendal and Müller in 1844, this species was discovered in 1842 on an expedition to collect biota in the forest of Batta-Lauder, near Tapoilang, Java. It has bright orange to red fruit bodies made of a stalk 1.5 to 2.5 cm (0.6 to 1.0 in) long and 1.5 to 2.0 cm (0.6 to 0.8 in) thick. The spores are spherical, covered with rounded to pyramid-shaped warts 1–2 μm long, with diameters of 12.5–15 μm; the spore surface ornamentation appears to be unique in the genus.
C. luridum (Berk.) Massee	1888	Near the Swan river in western Australia	
C. lutescens (Schw.) Burnap		North America	This species is commonly known as the "lattice puffball".
C. miniata M. Zang	1987	Growing with moss in Sichuan, China	
C. naaxtututsDeloya-Olvera, Virgen-Vasquez, Xoconostle-Cázares & J. Pérez-Moreno	2023	Southern Mexico	
C. oriruber Massee	1888	Larut, Perak, and the Malay Peninsula	
C. pengii B. Liu & Yin H. Liu	1984	In a forest in Hunan, China	
C. ravenelii (Berk.) Massee	1888	In the mountains of South Carolina, and Japan	
C. ravenelii var. microsporum (G.F. Atk.) Castro-Mend. & O.K. Mill. (1983)			This variant was first described by George Atkinson in 1903, who noticed a close resemblance to C. ravenelii, but believed that an often longer stalk and smaller, oblong spores (measuring 6–9 by 3.5–4.5 μm) were sufficient to warrant naming it a new species.
C. ravenelii var. ravenelii (Berk.) Massee	1988		
C. retisporum Boedijn	1938		
C. rodwayi Lloyd	1925		
C. sarasinii	1969	Singapore	
C. singaporense L. Fan & B. Liu	1995	Singapore	
C. tooteicDeloya-Olvera, Virgen-Vasquez, Xoconostle-Cázares & J. Pérez-Moreno	2023	Southern Mexico	
C. variispora B. Liu, Z.Y. Li & Du	1975	China	Characterized by its variable sized elliptical spores, which range from 9–18.9 by 5.7–8.6 μm.
C. viride (Berk.) Massee	1988	Tonglu and Sinchal, in the Sikkim Himalayas at an elevation of 7,000–9,000 feet (2,100–2,700 m)	
C. yunnanense L.J. Li & B. Liu	1984	Yunnan, China	
C. zanchianum (Rick) Baseia & Calonge	2006		First studied by Brazilian mycologist Johann Rick, the species was published posthumously, 15 years after his death in 1946. Initially named Myremyces zanchianus, only a single specimen is known. The species has an egg-shaped head, 1.3 cm (0.5 in) long by 1 cm (0.4 in) wide, atop a stalk. The "mouth" is star-shaped and made of 4 long slits that open at maturity. The spores are 30–35 by 15–20 μm, spindle-shaped to elliptical, smooth, and have a prominent longitudinal groove.
