= Mycena fuhreri =

Scientific classification
- Domain: Eukaryota
- Kingdom: Fungi
- Division: Basidiomycota
- Class: Agaricomycetes
- Order: Agaricales
- Family: Mycenaceae
- Genus: Mycena
- Species: M. fuhreri

Binomial name
- Mycena fuhreri Grgur. (2003)

Species of fungus

Mycena fuhreri is a species of agaric fungus in the family Mycenaceae. It is found in Tasmania, Australia, where it grows in leaf litter under Allocasuarina trees. Described in 2003 by mycologist Cheryl Grgurinovic, the specific epithet fuhreri honours mycologist Bruce A. Fuhrer.
