= Leonard Rodway =

English-born Australian dentist and botanist

Leonard Rodway CMG (5 October 1853 – 9 March 1936) was an English-born Australian dentist and botanist.

== Early life ==
Rodway was born in Torquay Devon, England, the thirteenth child of Henry Barron Rodway, a dentist and inventor of the Rodway life buoy, and his wife Elizabeth, née Allin.

== Career ==
Rodway emigrated to Australia and settled in Hobart, Tasmania. Rodway was registered under the first Tasmanian Dental Act 1884, but is mainly remembered for his interest in botany.

He was elected a trustee of the Tasmanian Museum, and Botanical Gardens, in 1911, and became director of the latter in 1928, when he pressed for a more scientific role for the Gardens, deprecating their use as solely for public recreation.

In 1930, Rodway assisted Harold Comber in his plant hunting expedition, during which 147 Tasmanian species were collected and dispatched to the UK.

== Works ==
From 1892 to 1928 Rodway presented scientific papers, principally to the Royal Society of Tasmania to which he was elected in 1884, and published The Tasmanian Flora (Hobart, 1903), a standard reference for forty years, Some Wild Flowers of Tasmania (Hobart, 1910) and Tasmanian Bryophyta (Hobart, 1914–16).

== Honours and awards ==
Rodway was made a Companion of the Order of St Michael and St George in the 1917 New Year Honours. He was awarded the Clarke Medal of the Royal Society of New South Wales in 1924, and the first Royal Society of Tasmania medal in 1928.

== Eponymy ==
Rodway has been honoured in the specific names of the fungi Calostoma rodwayi and Entoloma rodwayi, the fungi genus Rodwayella, as well the following plants:

- Carpha rodwayi
- Deyeuxia rodwayi
- Eucalyptus rodwayi
- Gahnia rodwayi
- Ozothamnus rodwayi
- Poa rodwayi
- Rodwaya thismiacea, (a synonym forThismia rodwayi)

A mountain range in Mount Field National Park, Tasmania, the Rodway Range, is also named in his honour.

== Personal life ==
Rodway married Louisa Susan Phillips, a dentist's daughter, in Brisbane on 19 May 1879. They had five sons and a daughter, Florence Rodway, who became a successful portrait painter. Louisa died in 1922, and the following year he married Olive Barnard, an amateur naturalist whose photographs had illustrated Some Wild Flowers of Tasmania.

Leonard Rodway was the father of the physician-botanist Frederick Arthur Rodway and the paternal grandfather of the botanist Gwenda Louise Davis (née Rodway).

== Death ==
Rodway died aged 82 on 9 March 1936 at Kingston. He was buried with Church of England rites at Cornelian Bay Cemetery.

Awards
Preceded by Edgeworth David	Clarke Medal; 1918	Succeeded by Joseph Edmund Carne
