= Bruce A. Fuhrer =

Australian mycologist

- Born: 31 December 1930
- Died: 31 March 2023 (aged 92)
- Awards: OAM among others (see text)
- Scientific career
- Fields: Mycology
- Workplaces: Monash University
- Author abbrev. (botany): Fuhrer

Bruce Alexander Fuhrer OAM (31 December 1930 – 31 March 2023) was an Australian botanist and photographer, specialising in cryptogams. His photographic collection of fungi numbers more than 3000 species.

== Early life ==
Born in Woollahra, Sydney, in 1930, Fuhrer developed his interest in nature as a boy, exploring the parks and forests of Sydney and the Blue Mountains with his father. At 17, Fuhrer moved to Portland, Victoria. Fuhrer met and was inspired by local naturalists Oswald Lightbody (Ossie) and Alexander Clifford Beauglehole (Cliff). It was during this period that he developed his interest in natural history and joined the Portland Field Naturalists' Club.

== Career ==
Fuhrer began his career as a photographer in Portland in 1955. In 1957 he formed the Portland Camera Club and was its president for six years. He was an inaugural member of the Mount Richmond National Park Management Committee, formed in 1960. He joined the Field Naturalists Club of Victoria (FNCV) and the Ringwood Field Naturalists Club in the sixties, and became Chairman of the Botany Group of the FNCV for three years. He also served on the FNCV Council between 1964 and 1968. In 1961 Fuhrer established the Ringwood Junior Field Naturalist Club and was president for sixteen years of its existence. He later established 'The Basin Junior Field Naturalist' Club (now the Wildlife Observers Club Inc.) Fuhrer contributed substantial photographs in the first comprehensive illustrative guide to Victorian Flora – Flowers And Plants Of Victoria And Tasmania published in 1968. Already acknowledged as a botanist and photographer, he was invited to judge at the 1970, 1974 and 1978 Victorian Photoflora Competitions.

Fuhrer's first publication was in 1978: A Field Guide to the Common Genera of Gilled Fungi in Australia. He subsequently wrote many books on Australian fungi, including A Field Guide to Australian Fungi. Fuhrer worked for 25 years in the School of Biology at Monash University. At this time, he co-authored species including Rozites armeniacovelatus (now Cortinarius armeniacovelatus). For this work at Monash University, he received an Honorary Master of Science degree in 1988. Fuhrer was a Senior Technical Officer, Departments of Ecology and Evolutionary Biology, at Monash University for the years 1972 to 1996. Fuhrer has discovered several previously undescribed fungal species and described many liverworts. There are four species of fungi and two liverworts named after Fuhrer. The fungi are Calostoma fuhreri (desert prettymouth), Hygrocybe fuhreri, Hypoxylon fuhreri and Mycena fuhreri; the liverworts are Fossombronia fuhreri and Bazzania fuhreri.

== Death ==
Fuhrer died on 31 March 2023, at the age of 92.

== Publications ==
Books authored by Fuhrer, or in collaboration with others:

- 2010 A Field Guide to Australian Fungi (Revised edition) ISBN 9781876473518
- 2009 (With M Corrick) Wildflowers of southern Western Australia. 3rd Edition ISBN 9781877058844
- 2003 Field Guide to the Mosses and Allied Plants of Southern Australia, David Meagher and Bruce Fuhrer (Flora of Australia Supplementary Series No. 20) ISBN 9780642568281
- 2002 Wildflowers of Southern Western Australia, Margaret G. Corrick and Bruce A. Fuhrer ISBN 9781877058844
- 2001 Australian Fungi: A Field Companion ISBN 9781876473402
- 2001 Wildflowers of Victoria, Margaret G. Corrick and Bruce A. Fuhrer ISBN 9781876473143
- 1992 Rainforest Fungi of Tasmania and South-East Australia, Bruce A. Fuhrer and Richard Robinson ISBN 9780643052413
- 1988 Seaweeds of Australia, text edited by Iona G. Christianson, Margaret N. Clayton and Bruce M. Allender ISBN 9780589502935
- 1985 A Field Companion To Australian Fungi ISBN 0867880635
- 1984 A Field Guide to The Common Genera Of Gilled Fungi in Australia (Mushrooms and Toadstools) Martina Cole, Bruce A. Fuhrer and Albert Holland, Revised edition ISBN 9780909605117
- 1980 Flowers And Plants Of Victoria And Tasmania, Gordon R. Cochrane, Bruce A. Fuhrer, Edward R. Rotherham, John Simmons, Marion Simmons, James Hamlyn Willis, Revised edition ISBN 9780589502560

== Awards ==
- 2011 Order of Australia Medal OAM
- 2009 Andrew Gibson Nature Medallion from the Australian Photographic Society Inc.
- 2005 Life member of Field Naturalists Club of Victoria (FNCV)
- 1995–1998 Honorary Associate, National Herbarium of Victoria, Royal Botanic Gardens Melbourne
- 1995 Honorary Research Associate, Departments of Ecology and Evolutionary Biology, Monash University
- 1989 Australian Natural History Medallion from the Field Naturalists Club of Victoria (FNCV)
- 1988 Honorary Master of Science degree, Monash University
- 1976 Life member of Ringwood Field Naturalists Club Inc.

== See also ==
- List of mycologists
- Fungi of Australia
