= Gwenda Louise Davis =

Australian botanist (1911–1993)

- Born: Dorothy Gwenda Louise Rodway; 1911; Chatswood, New South Wales
- Died: 22 September 1993 (aged 81–82); Port Macquarie, New South Wales
- Scientific career
- Fields: Botany
- Institutions: University of New England (Australia)
- Author abbrev. (botany): G.L.Davis

Gwenda Louise Davis (1911–1993) was an Australian botanist. She is known for her work on embryology, in particular, for work on the embryology of Australian Asteraceae and the genus Eucalyptus.

She started her career as a plant taxonomist in 1945 at the New England University College at Armidale (now the University of New England, and was largely responsible for the creation of the Department of Botany there. After a fire in 1958, which destroyed the building housing the Botany Department, she concentrated her research on plant embryology.

The standard author abbreviation G.L.Davis is used to indicate this person as the author when citing a botanical name.

== Names published ==
(incomplete list)

- Brachyscome ascendens G.L.Davis, Proc. Linn. Soc. New South Wales 73: 175 (1948).
- Brachyscome blackii G.L.Davis, Proc. Linn. Soc. New South Wales 73: 207 (1948).
- Calotis cuneata (F.Muell. ex Benth.) G.L.Davis, Proc. Linn. Soc. New South Wales 77: 175 (1952)
- Podolepis neglecta G.L.Davis, Proc. Linn. Soc. New South Wales 81:. 259 (1957)

(These may not be accepted names.)

== Publications ==
(incomplete)

- (1966) Systematic embryology of the angiosperms
- (1949) Revision of the genus Brachycome Cass. Part II, New Zealand species
- (1948–1954) Revision of the genus Brachycome Cass.
- (1950) Revision of the genus Solenogyne Cass.

== Personal ==
In 1936 she married Harrold Fosbery Consett Davis. He died in an aircraft accident in New Guinea in 1944, aged 31, leaving Davis to bring up their three children. Her father was the physician-botanist Frederick Arthur Rodway, and her paternal grandfather was the dentist-botanist Leonard Rodway.
