= Eucalyptus rodwayi =

Swamp peppermint

Scientific classification
- Kingdom: Plantae
- Clade: Tracheophytes
- Clade: Angiosperms
- Clade: Eudicots
- Clade: Rosids
- Order: Myrtales
- Family: Myrtaceae
- Genus: Eucalyptus
- Species: E. rodwayi

Binomial name
- Eucalyptus rodwayi R.T.Baker & H.G.Sm.

Species of eucalyptus

Eucalyptus rodwayi, commonly known as the swamp peppermint, is a species of small to medium-sized tree that is endemic to Tasmania. It has rough, fibrous to flaky bark on the trunk and branches, narrow lance-shaped adult leaves, flower buds in groups of between seven and eleven, white flowers and conical to hemispherical fruit.

== Description ==
Eucalyptus rodwayi is a tree that typically grows to a height of 20 m (66 ft) and forms a lignotuber. It has rough, greyish fibrous or flaky bark on the trunk and branches. Young plants and coppice regrowth have lance-shaped to elliptical leaves 25–78 mm (0.98–3.07 in) long and 7–20 mm (0.28–0.79 in) wide. Adult leaves are the same shade of glossy green on both sides, narrow lance-shaped or curved, 50–135 mm (2.0–5.3 in) long and 7–20 mm (0.28–0.79 in) wide, tapering to a petiole 5–15 mm (0.20–0.59 in) long. The flower buds are arranged in groups of seven, nine or eleven on a peduncle 4–8 mm (0.16–0.31 in) long, the individual flowers on pedicels 2–3 mm (0.079–0.118 in) long. Mature buds are oval to diamond-shaped, 4–6 mm (0.16–0.24 in) long and 2–3.5 mm (0.079–0.138 in) wide with a conical operculum about equal in length to the floral cup. Flowering occurs between December and March and the flowers are white. The fruit is a conical to hemispherical capsule 2–5 mm (0.079–0.197 in) long and 4–6 mm (0.16–0.24 in) wide with the valves near rim level.

== Taxonomy and naming ==
Eucalyptus rodwayi was first formally described in 1902 by Richard Thomas Baker and Henry George Smith in their book A research on the eucalypts of Tasmania and their essential oils. The specific epithet (rodwayi) honours Leonard Rodway for his contribution to botanical research in Tasmania.

== Distribution and habitat ==
Swamp peppermint grows in poorly-drained areas in valleys from the central plateau to the east coast of Tasmania.

== See also ==
- List of Eucalyptus species
