= Calostomal =

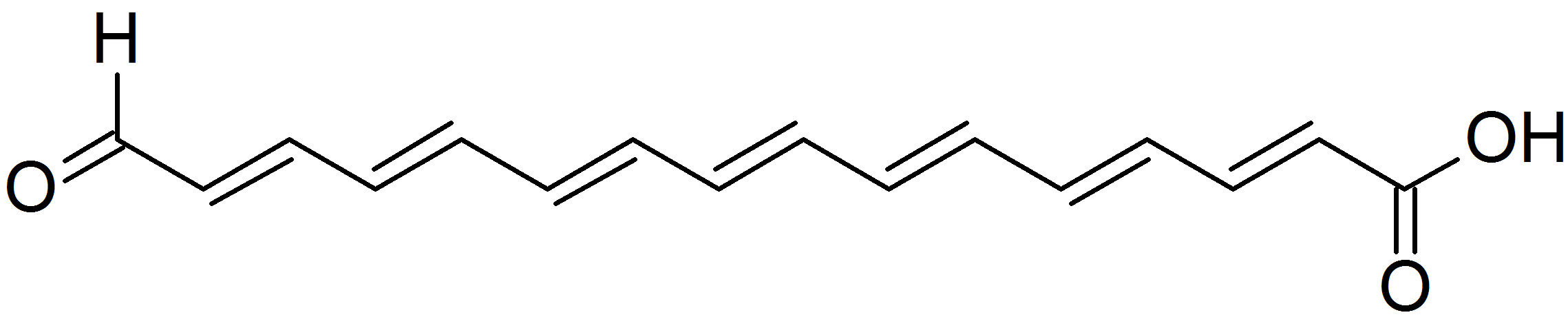

Names
- Preferred IUPAC name (2E,4E,6E,8E,10E,12E,14E)-16-Oxohexadeca-2,4,6,8,10,12,14-heptaenoic acid

Identifiers
CAS Number	935858-29-0
3D model (JSmol)	Interactive image
ChemSpider	28283879
PubChem CID	71308171
UNII	QD4HPW6LBB
CompTox Dashboard (EPA)	DTXSID00745429
- InChI: InChI=1S/C16H16O3/c17-15-13-11-9-7-5-3-1-2-4-6-8-10-12-14-16(18)19/h1-15H,(H,18,19)/b2-1+,5-3+,6-4+,9-7+,10-8+,13-11+,14-12+ Key: GIIWFUDWDOUFTE-JCSPMBIZSA-N; InChI=1/C16H16O3/c17-15-13-11-9-7-5-3-1-2-4-6-8-10-12-14-16(18)19/h1-15H,(H,18,19)/b2-1+,5-3+,6-4+,9-7+,10-8+,13-11+,14-12+ Key: GIIWFUDWDOUFTE-JCSPMBIZBZ
- SMILES: C(=C/C=C/C=C/C=C/C(=O)O)\C=C\C=C\C=C\C=O

Properties
Chemical formula	C_{16}H_{16}O_{3}
Molar mass	256.301 g·mol^{−1}
- Except where otherwise noted, data are given for materials in their standard state (at 25 °C [77 °F], 100 kPa). Infobox references

Calostomal is an organic compound that has a carboxylic acid and an aldehyde group. It is a red-orange solid that is extracted from the mushroom Calostoma cinnabarinum, hence the name. The structure of this compound was confirmed by NMR and mass spectrometry of the methyl ester derivative. This compound is a highly conjugated polyene somewhat similar to the lycopene found in tomatoes.

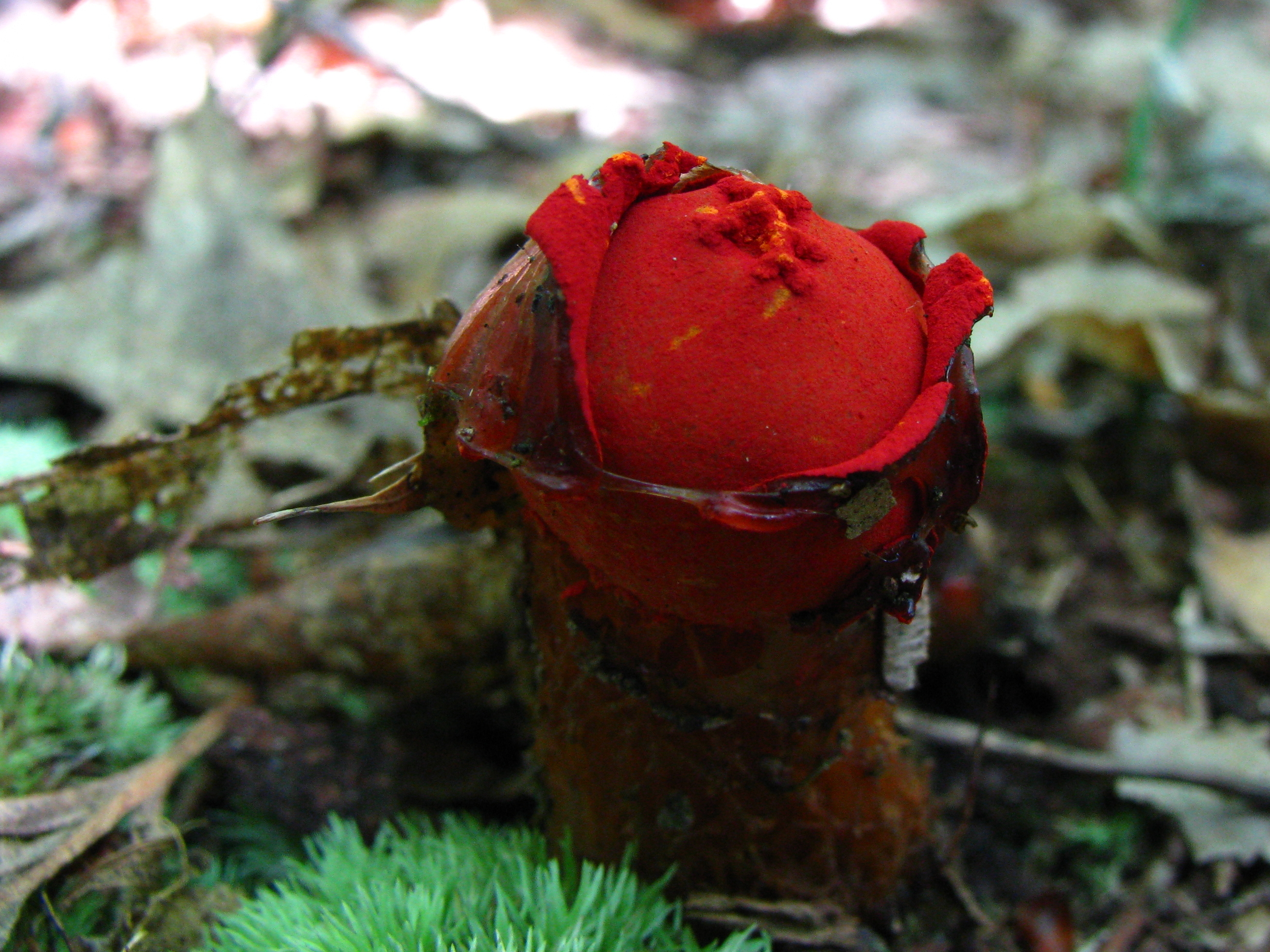
Calostoma cinnabarinum
