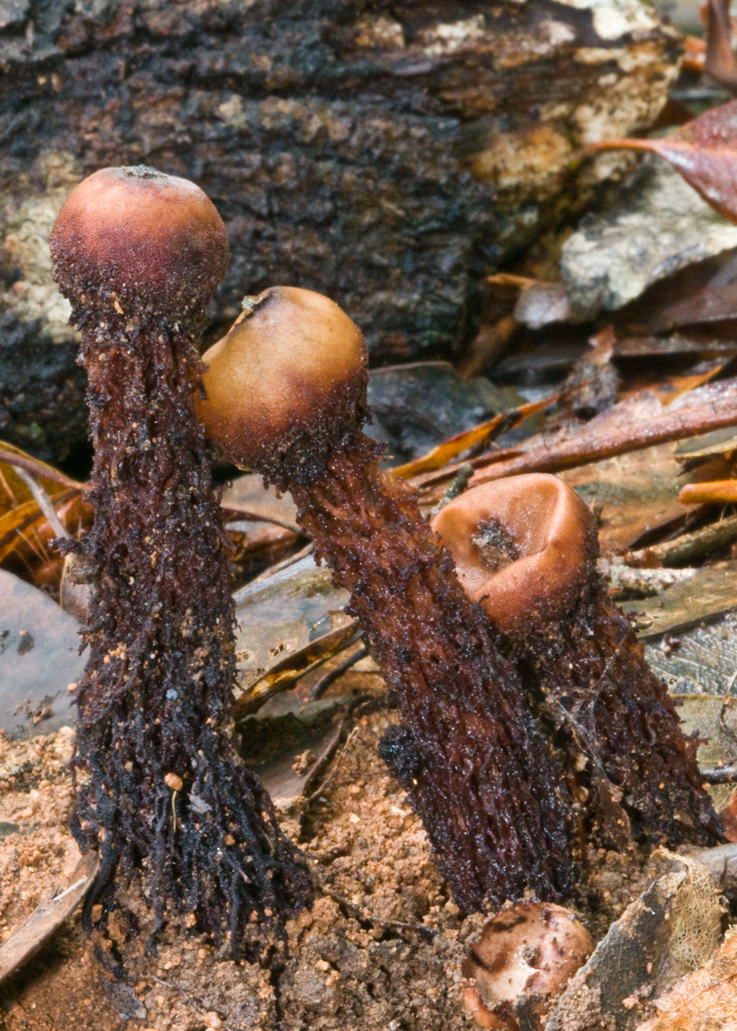

Scientific classification
- Domain: Eukaryota
- Kingdom: Fungi
- Division: Basidiomycota
- Class: Agaricomycetes
- Order: Boletales
- Family: Sclerodermataceae
- Genus: Calostoma
- Species: C. fuscum

Binomial name
- Calostoma fuscum (Berk.) Massee (1888)

Synonyms
- Mitremyces fuscus Berk. (1839)

= Calostoma fuscum =

Species of fungus

Calostoma fuscum is a species of gasteroid fungus in the family Sclerodermataceae. Found in Australia, where it grows mainly in Eucalyptus forests, it was originally described by Miles Joseph Berkeley in 1839 as Mitremyces fuscus. George Edward Massee transferred it to the genus Calostoma in 1888.
