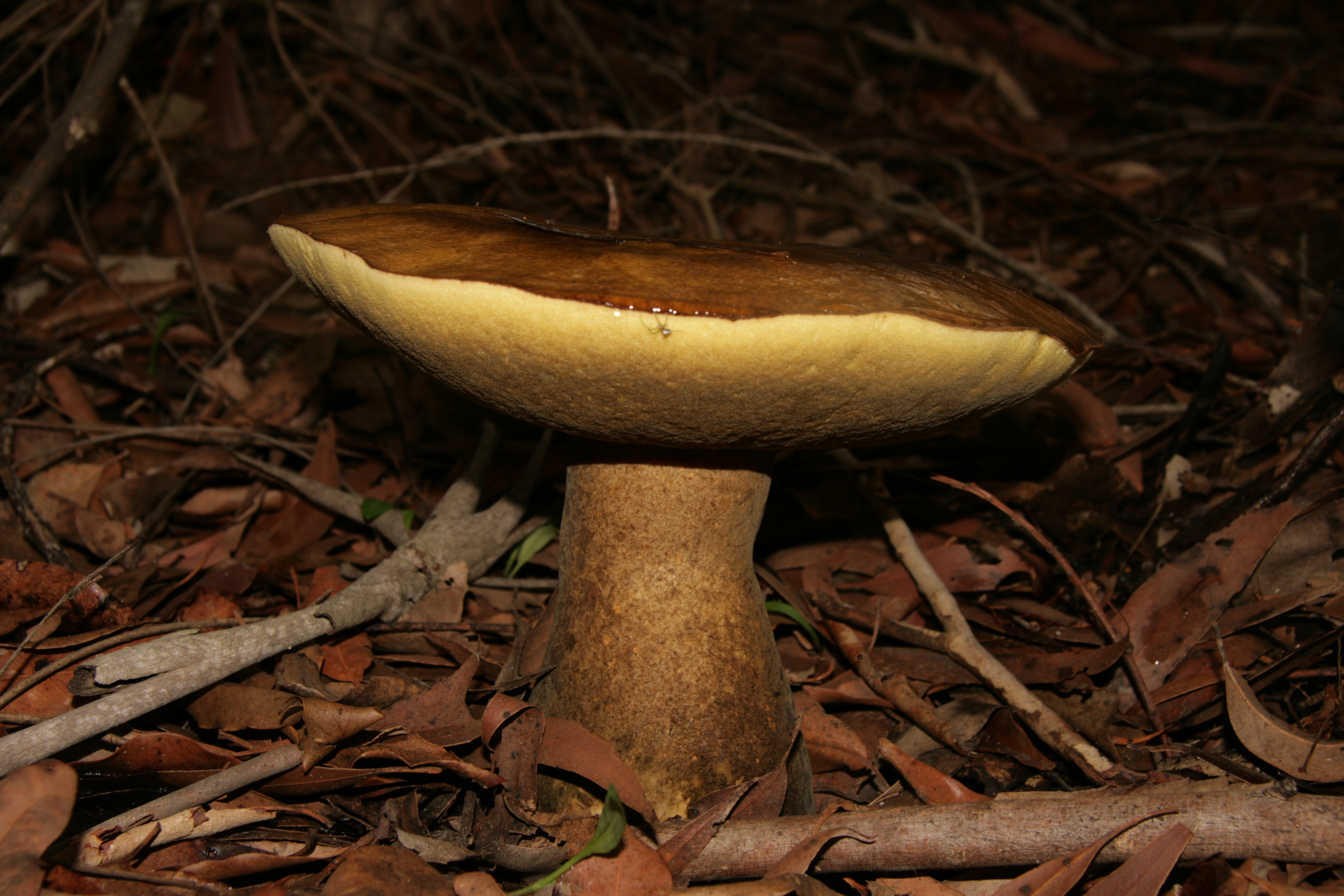
- In New South Wales, Australia

Scientific classification
- Kingdom: Fungi
- Division: Basidiomycota
- Class: Agaricomycetes
- Order: Boletales
- Family: Boletinellaceae
- Genus: Phlebopus
- Species: P. marginatus

Binomial name
- Phlebopus marginatus Watling & N.M.Greg. (1988)

Synonyms
- Boletus marginatus J.Drumm. (1845); Boletus portentosus Berk. & Broome (1873); Phlebopus portentosus (Berk. & Broome) Boedijn (1951); Phaeogyroporus portentosus (Berk. & Broome) McNabb (1968); Boletus brevitubus M.Zang (1991)

= Phlebopus marginatus =

Species of fungus

Phlebopus marginatus
- Mycological characteristics
- Pores on hymenium
- Cap is convex
- Hymenium is seceding
- Stipe is bare
- Spore print is brown
- Ecology is mycorrhizal
- Edibility is edible but not recommended

Phlebopus marginatus, commonly known as the salmon gum mushroom in Western Australia, is a member of the Boletales or pored fungi. An imposing sight in forests of south-eastern and south-western Australia, it is possibly Australia's largest terrestrial mushroom, with the weight of one specimen from Victoria recorded at 29 kg (64 lb). Initially described in 1845 as Boletus marginatus, and also previously known by scientific names such as Phaeogyroporus portentosus and Boletus portentosus, it is not as closely related to typical boletes as previously thought.

== Taxonomy ==
English naturalist Miles Joseph Berkeley initially described Boletus marginatus in 1845, from the writings and specimens of James Drummond, from the vicinity of the Swan River Colony in Western Australia. Berkeley and Broome described Boletus portentosus in a report published in 1873 of the fungi of Ceylon, from a specimen with a 25 cm (8 in) diameter cap collected on June 15, 1869. They held it to be related to Boletus aestivalis. Microscopic differences led to it being reclassified; Boedijn noted the shape of its spores, lack of cystidia and short tubes and allocated it to the genus Phlebopus in 1951. New Zealand botanist Robert McNabb followed Rolf Singer who had determined Phlebopus was a nomen dubium (though conceding Singer was likely in error), and coined the binomial Phaeogyroporus portentosus, by which it was known for some years. In his 1982 review of the genus, mycologist Paul Heinemann used this latter designation. The generic name is derived from the Greek Φλεψ/Φλεβο- "vein", and πους "foot".

Considering the two taxa to be the same, mycologist Roy Watling proposed the name Phlebopus marginatus over P. portentosus in 2001, pointing out that the former name predated the latter. He noted specimens across its range conform to the species description, although queried whether a single species occurs over so wide a range.

It is not as closely related to typical boletes as was previously thought. The genus Phlebopus is a member of the suborder Sclerodermatineae, which makes it more closely related to earth balls than to typical boletes. Within this suborder, Phlebopus makes up the family Boletinellaceae with Boletinellus. Boletus brevitubus, described from Cephalocitrus grandis and Delonix regia forests of Yunnan, China in 1991, was placed into synonymy with Phlebopus marginatus in 2009.

A common name in Western Australia is salmon gum mushroom. Common names in Asia include hed har and hed tub tao dum in Thailand, or tropical black bolete.

== Description ==
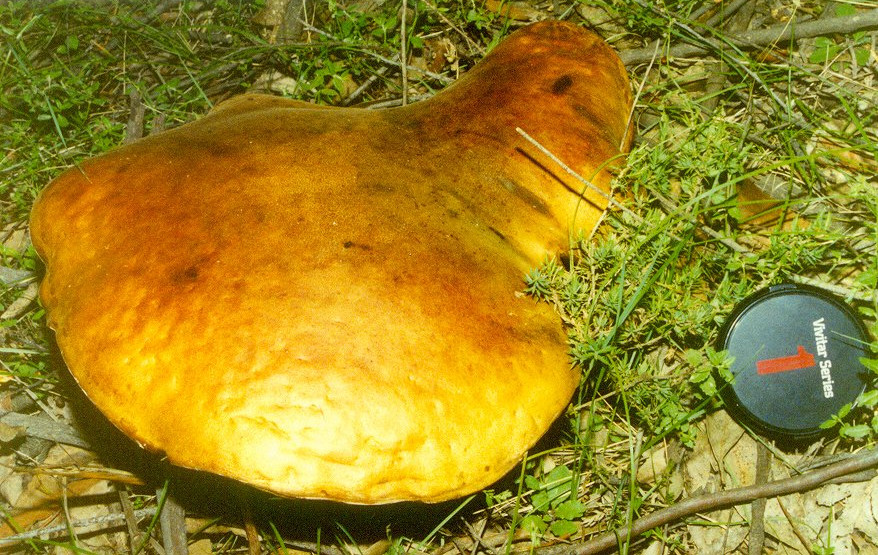
P. marginatus cap from above, East Gippsland, Victoria - January 1992

Possibly Australia's largest terrestrial mushroom, Phlebopus marginatus produces fruit bodies that can reach huge proportions. The weight of one specimen from western Victoria recorded at 30 kg (66 pounds). John Burton Cleland reported finding specimens with a cap diameter of 80 cm (31 in), weighing over 80 pounds (36 kg), but reports about specimens with caps over 150 cm (59 in) in diameter also exist. The cap is convex to flat, occasionally with a depressed centre. It is brown to olive and covered in fine hair. Records between countries vary as to the colour change on cutting or bruising of flesh, with those of Western Australia indicating no change, while New Zealand and Indonesian collections are reported to have some bluish discoloration on bruising at the top of the stem. The spores are yellow-brown. Mature specimens are very attractive to insects and often infested with them.

== Distribution and habitat ==
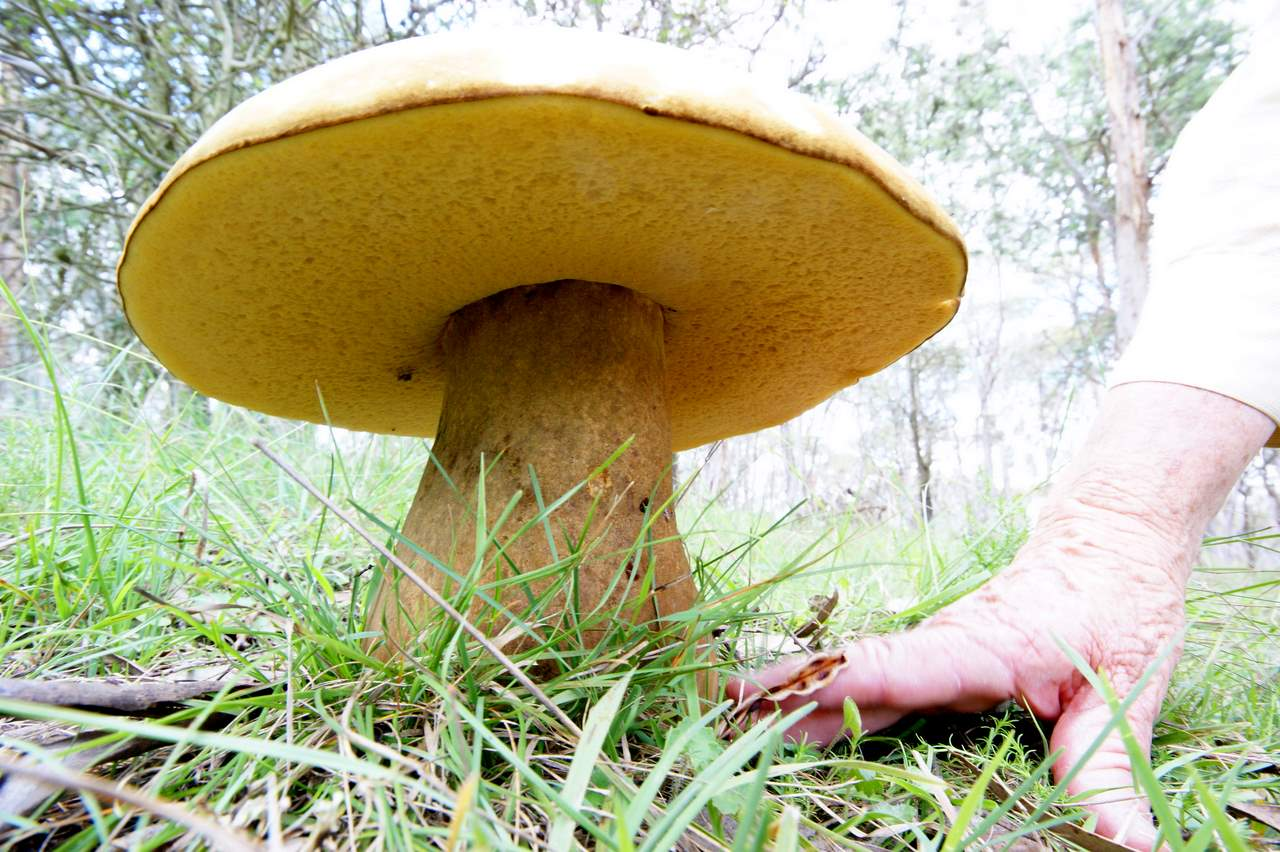
Phlebopus marginatus near Honeysuckle Creek, ACT

Phlebopus marginatus is an example of a Gondwanan fungus, being found in Indonesia, Malaysia and Sri Lanka as well as Australia and New Zealand, with related species found in South America. In fact, it is a pantropical species.

Within Australia it has been recorded from the southeast of South Australia to New South Wales. Within Australia it occurs in eucalypt forests and may be found any time after rain. Fruit bodies may be isolated or spring up in groups or even fairy rings. It occurs in rainforest in the Cooloola section of the Great Sandy National Park in Queensland.

In New Zealand it is possibly associated with Nothofagus truncata. McNabb was unsure of whether it was introduced or indigenous to New Zealand though suspected it was the latter due to it being found in dense native forest near Rotorua. Other collections were in the vicinity of Auckland.

It is common in Java and Sumatra.

In China it is found in Yunnan, Guangxi and Hainan provinces. In China, it grows in association with poinciana (Delonix regia), mango (Mangifera indica), coffee (Coffea arabica), pomelo (Citrus grandis), jackfruit (Artocarpus heterophyllus) and oak (Quercus) species.

== Edibility ==
As with many Australian mushrooms, Phlebopus marginatus is not widely eaten although recorded in several publications as edible and mild tasting or bland. Australian mushroom expert Bruce Fuhrer warns of its propensity to be maggot-ridden.

It is consumed in Laos, northern Thailand, Myanmar and southern China, namely the tropical areas of Yunnan province, where excessive picking for markets has depleted wild populations. Its large size and flavour make it a desired mushroom in markets in the Xishuangbanna region. It is also consumed on the island of Réunion. Since 2003, efforts have been made to try and cultivate it.
