= Frederick Arthur Rodway =

Australian physician, botanist and plant collector

Frederick Arthur Rodway (25 March 1880, Hobart, Tasmania – 1 April 1956, Nowra, New South Wales) was an Australian physician, botanist, and plant collector. He collected spermatophytes in New South Wales and Western Australia.

== Biography ==
F. A. Rodway was a physician based in Nowra, where he had a house and a surgery. He collected botanical specimens primarily in South Coast, New South Wales (NSW).

Edwin Cheel published a 1919 paper crediting Rodway with raising the variety Leptospermum scoparium var. rotundifolium (described in 1900 by Maiden and Betche) to species status as Leptospermum rotundifolium.

F. A. Rodway's daughter was the botanist Gwenda Louise Davis (née Rodway), and his father was the botanist-dentist Leonard Rodway. The NSW Rodway Nature Reserve is named in honour of the family.

== Eponyms ==
- Plinthanthesis rodwayi (Budawanga wallaby grass) (See Plinthanthesis.)
