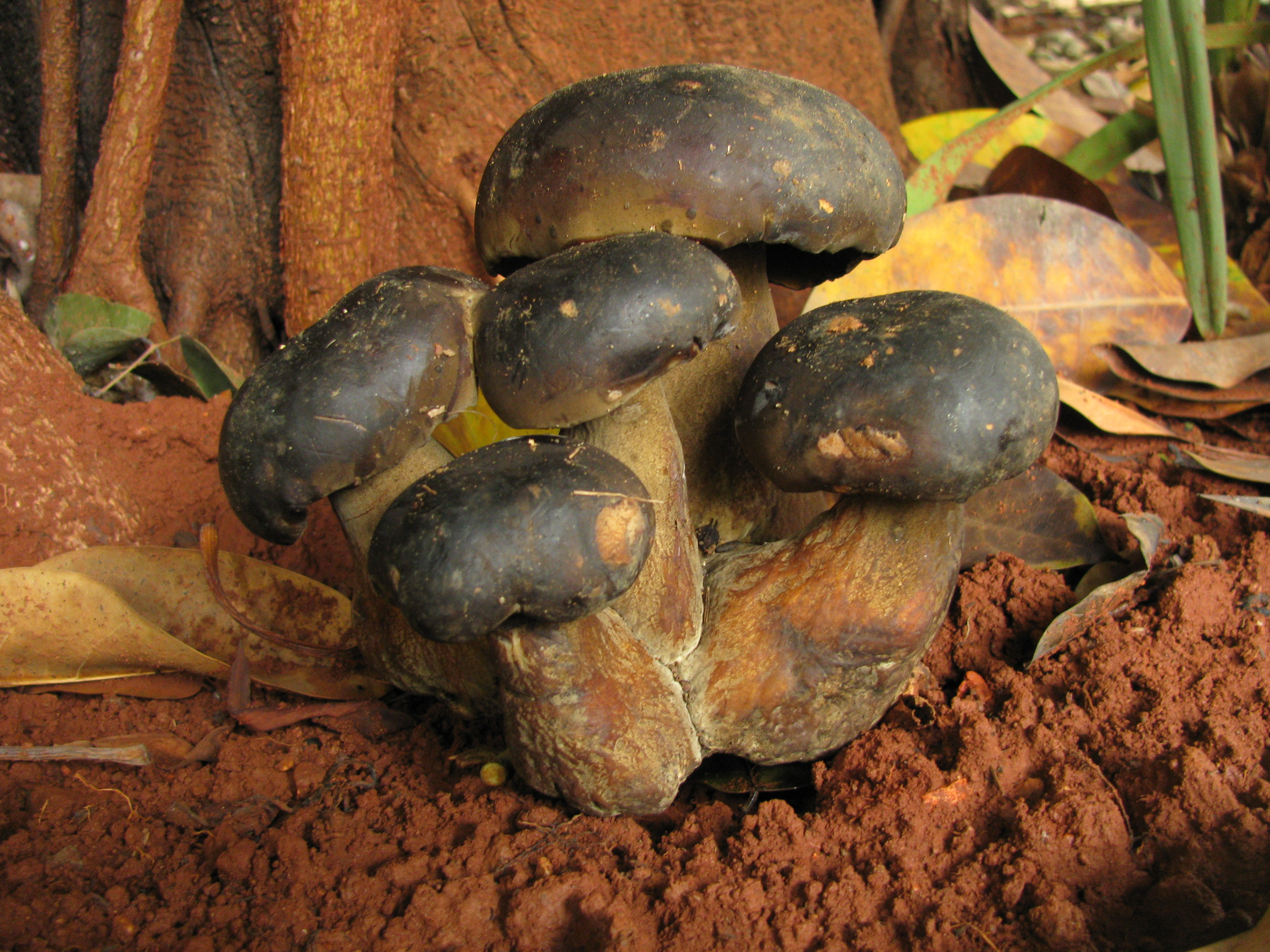
- Phlebopus portentosus

Scientific classification
- Kingdom: Fungi
- Division: Basidiomycota
- Class: Agaricomycetes
- Order: Boletales
- Family: Boletinellaceae
- Genus: Phlebopus (R.Heim) Singer (1936)

Type species
- Phlebopus colossus (R.Heim) Singer (1936)

Species
- 12, see text

Synonyms
- Boletus subgen. Phlebopus R.Heim (1936); Phaeogyroporus Singer (1944)

= Phlebopus =

Genus of fungi

Phlebopus is a genus of fungi in the family Boletinellaceae (suborder Sclerodermatineae of the Boletales order). The genus has a widespread distribution in subtropical and pantropical regions, and contains 12 species. The species are saprobic, with some possibly able to form mycorrhizae with exotic trees in certain conditions. It contains the gigantic Phlebopus marginatus, the cap of which can reach 1 m (3.3 ft) in diameter.

== Taxonomy ==
The genus was originally described as a subgenus of Boletus by Roger Heim in 1936, and raised to generic status by Rolf Singer that year. It was later redescribed with another type species (Phaeogyroporus braunii) under the name Phaeogyroporus by Rolf Singer in 1944. This name was used until 1981, when a specimen of Phlebopus colossus was collected and mycologist Paul Heinemann designated it as the lectotype.

The genus name is derived from the Greek Φλεβο- "vein" and πους "foot".

== Description ==
Phlebopus is similar in appearance to species in the genus Gyrodon, but distinguished by its olive-brown to brown spore print, its stem which is never hollow, and its smooth spores which are brownish when viewed with a light microscope.

== Importance ==
Phlebopus tropicus has been shown to form a crust of mycelium around the roots of species of Citrus in Brazil, covering colonies of the comstock mealybug Pseudococcus comstocki which attack the roots of these plants after they have been carried there by ants (Solenopsis saevissima var. moelleri); these mycelial crusts are called "criptas" by Brazilian writers. The Pseudococcus living in symbiosis with the fungus is believed to be the immediate reason for the subsequent death of the affected trees, but the action of an endotrophic mycorrhizal fungus weakens the plant before the attack of the Pseudococcus takes place.

Phlebopus portentosus and P. spongiosus are popular edible mushrooms in the cuisine of northern Thailand. They can produce fruiting bodies without a host plant, and can be therefore cultivated. P. bruchii is consumed as an edible mushroom in Argentina.

== Species ==
As of February 2023, Index Fungorum lists the following species in Phlebopus:

Image	Name	Taxon Author	Year
	Phlebopus beniensis	(Singer & Digilio) Heinem. & Rammeloo	1982
	Phlebopus brasiliensis	Singer	1983
	Phlebopus braunii	(Bres.) Heinem.	1951
	Phlebopus bruchii	(Speg.) Heinem. & Rammeloo	1982
	Phlebopus colossus	(R. Heim) Singer	1936
	Phlebopus cystidiosus	Heinem. & Rammeloo	1982
	Phlebopus harleyi	Heinem. & Rammeloo	1982
	Phlebopus latiporus	Heinem. & Rammeloo	1982
	Phlebopus marginatus	Watling & N.M. Greg.	1988
	Phlebopus mexicanus	Cifuentes, Cappello, T.J. Baroni & B. Ortiz	2015
	Phlebopus portentosus	(Berk. & Broome) Boedijn	1951
	Phlebopus silvaticus	Heinem.	1951
	Phlebopus spongiosus	Pham & Har. Takah.	2012
	Phlebopus sudanicus	(Har. & Pat.) Heinem.	1954
	Phlebopus tropicus	(Rick) Heinem. & Rammeloo	1982
	Phlebopus viperinus	Singer	1947
	Phlebopus xanthopus	T.H. Li & Watling	1999
