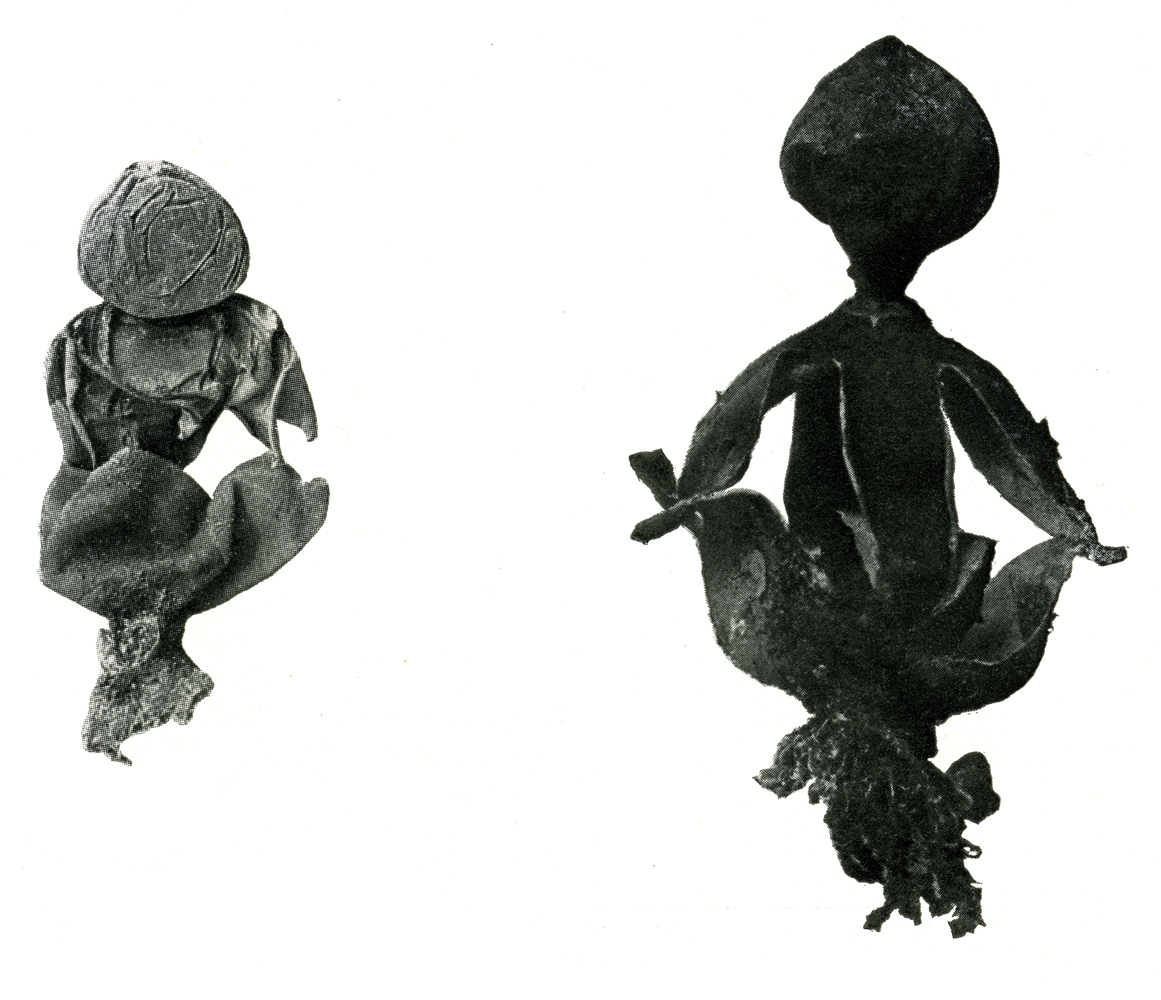
- Left: type specimen; right: specimen collected in Florida, and kept at the herbarium of the Department of Agriculture, Washington

Scientific classification
- Kingdom: Fungi
- Division: Basidiomycota
- Class: Agaricomycetes
- Order: Geastrales
- Family: Geastraceae
- Genus: Geastrum
- Species: G. welwitschii

Binomial name
- Geastrum welwitschii Mont. (1856)

Synonyms
- Geastrum javanicum var. welwitschii (Mont.) P. Ponce de León; Geastrum radicans Berk. & M.A. Curtis

= Geastrum welwitschii =

Species of fungus

Geastrum welwitschii
- Mycological characteristics
- Glebal hymenium
- No distinct cap
- Hymenium attachment is not applicable
- Lacks a stipe
- Spore print is brown
- Ecology is saprotrophic
- Edibility is inedible

Geastrum welwitschii is a species of fungus in the earthstar family. First collected from Portugal in the mid-19th century, the fungus is distributed in Europe, North America, and Bermuda.

When young and unopened, the fruit bodies resemble small spheres lying in the soil. As the mushroom matures, the thick leathery outer layer of tissue (the peridium) splits star-like to form a number of fleshy arms, which curve downward to reveal the inner spore sac that contains the fertile tissue known as the gleba. The spore sac has a narrow grooved opening at the top where the spores are released. Fully expanded, the fruit bodies are up to 35 mm (1 3/8 in) wide and 58 mm (2 1/4 in) tall.

== Taxonomy ==
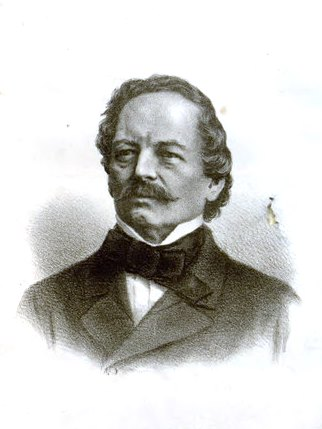
Friedrich Welwitsch

The fungus was first collected in Portugal by the Austrian explorer and botanist Friedrich Welwitsch. British mycologist Miles Joseph Berkeley obtained the specimens and thought them to be Geastrum fimbriatum. He sent a specimen to the French mycologist Camille Montagne in 1856, who named it Geaster Welwitschii (Geaster is an orthographical variant of Geastrum). Patricio Ponce de León in his 1968 world monograph of Geastrum, considered the species a fornicate variety of G. javanicum, and described it as Geastrum javanicum var. welwitschii; this is now a synonym.

According to Stanek's infrageneric (ranks below the level of genus) concept of the genus Geastrum, G. welwitschii is classified in the section Basimyceliata, which includes species in which the outer part of the mycelial layer do not incorporate sand and encrusting debris. It is further classified in the subsection Laevistomata because its peristome (an opening at the top of the spore sac) is even to fibrillose (with fibrils).

== Description ==
The mature fruit body of G. welwitschii is small to medium-sized, with a fornicate spore sac, meaning that the spore sac is raised into the air as the rays press down. Unlike some other earthstar fungi, the mycelial layer does not encrust debris as the fruit body develops. The peristome is even, and has an indistinct boundary. The young fruit bodies just prior to opening are found near the surface of the ground, and are rounded, with or without an umbo, and attached to the substrate with a basal mycelial tuft or cord. The expanded fruit body is small to medium-sized. The fornicate exoperidium (outer peridium) has the upper, arched part (fibrous and pseudoparenchymatous layers) split to about the half-way point or more into 4–7 rays. The mycelial cup is free (only attached at its base), with 4–7 more or less well-developed lobes corresponding to the 4–7 rays. The width of the fruit body is about 20–35 mm (3/4–1 3/8 in), and in height about 40–58 mm (1 5/8–2 1/4 in) (including the 15–20 mm high mycelial cup). The diameter of the exoperidium is about 39–72 mm (1 1/2–2 7/8 in).

The pseudoparenchymatous layer (a layer of thin-walled, usually angular, randomly arranged cells that are tightly packed) is initially beige, later brownish, in age dark brown, cracked and if moist reddish brown. The fibrous layer is beige-colored, with its outer side free from the mycelial layer except at the tips of the rays. The mycelial layer has a beige brown to somewhat yellowish-brown, felted to tufted outer surface, darkening to reddish-brown if moist. It is not encrusted with debris, but some debris and sand may adhere. The inner side is smooth, dull to somewhat glossy, and hazelnut brown.

The spore sac is stalked, and roughly spherical, with a diameter of about 8–20 mm (3/8–3/4 in). The stalk is short but distinct, up to 1.5 mm (1/16 in) high, light beige in color, and sometimes indistinctly developed. The endoperidium (inner peridium) is more or less smooth to the unaided eye, but densely protruding light to grayish-brown hyphal tips are present. The peristome is indistinctly delimited (without distinct boundaries), and the mouth area fibrillose. The columella is not well-developed, and broadly club-shaped to columnar; in cross-section it is whitish to pale beige. The mature gleba is brown and powdery.

The spores of Geastrum welwitschii are roughly spherical, sometimes contain an oil droplet, and measure 4.5–5.5 μm in diameter. Scanning electron microscopy has revealed that the spore surface is covered with column-like processes, up to 0.45 μm high, that may be more or less confluent.

=== Similar species ===
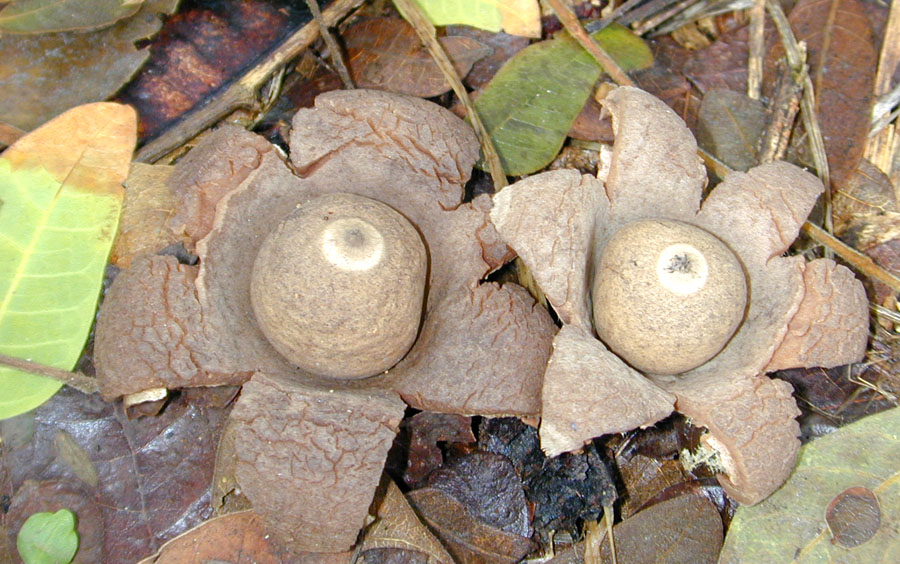
Geastrum aff. welwitschii is found in Hawaii.

Geastrum welwitschii is morphologically similar to G. fornicatum in having fornicate, mostly 3–6 rays, of exoperidia and a cup-shaped mycelial layer. Geastrum welwitschii is distinguished from G. fornicatum by its epigeal mycelial cup with a felted or tufted outer surface.

Geastrum welwitschii also has similar morphological characters to G. minimum in having small fruit bodies, whitish exoperidia, and fibrillose peristomes. However G. welwitschii is differentiated from G. minimum by its fornicate, mostly 3–6, rays of the exoperidia, and the mycelial layer that easily loosens from the fibrous layer to form a mycelial cup. G. welwitschii is distinguished from G. entomophilum, which has a dark and sessile endoperidium, and smaller spores (2.8–3.5 μm).

According to mycologists Hemmes and Desjardin, the most common earthstar in the coastal Casuarina forests of Hawaii is a species "closely allied" with G. welwitschii, which they name Geastrum aff. welwitschii. (Note: The term "aff." (for affinis) indicates that the specimen or group of specimens is closely related to the named species, but shows features that suggest it is a different species.) It differs from the main species in its much coarser pyramidal warts on the exoperidial surface, a sessile and sac-shaped endoperidial body, and smaller spores. They likened the roughened outer surface of the exoperidium to lychee fruit.

== Habitat and distribution ==
The fungus is saprobic, and grows on the ground, in leaf litter, or on decomposing wood. It has been collected in Portugal, South Carolina, Florida, Bermuda and the Netherlands.
