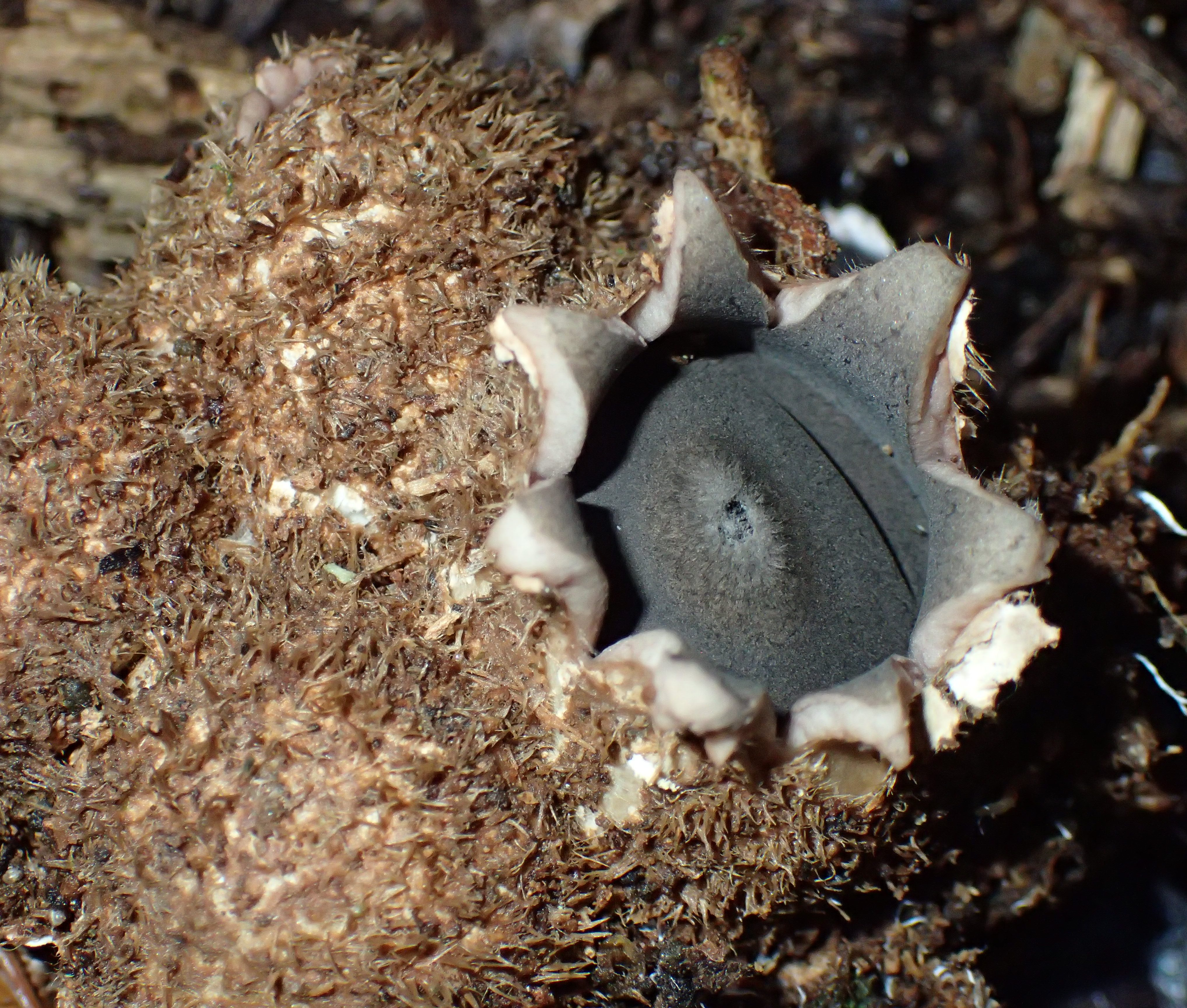

Scientific classification
- Kingdom: Fungi
- Division: Basidiomycota
- Class: Agaricomycetes
- Order: Geastrales
- Family: Geastraceae
- Genus: Geastrum
- Species: G. albonigrum

Binomial name
- Geastrum albonigrum Calogne & Mata (2004)

= Geastrum albonigrum =

Species of fungus

Geastrum albonigrum is an inedible species of mushroom belonging to the genus Geastrum, or earthstar genus. It is found in Costa Rica and Mexico. G. albonigrum can be distinguished from superficially similar species G. coronatum and G. lloydianum by the presence of a rhizomorph on its exoperidium.
