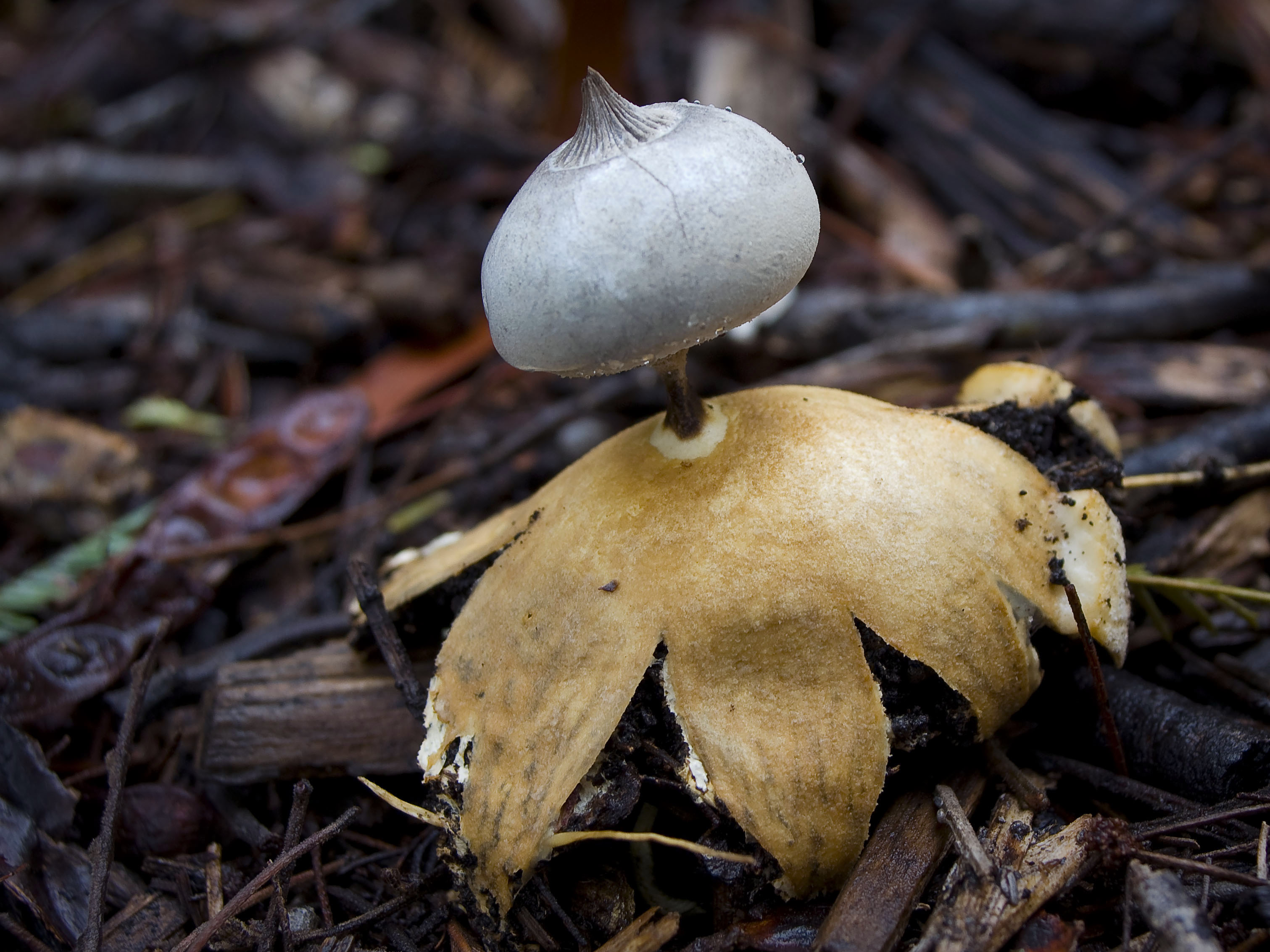

Scientific classification
- Kingdom: Fungi
- Division: Basidiomycota
- Class: Agaricomycetes
- Order: Geastrales
- Family: Geastraceae
- Genus: Geastrum
- Species: G. pectinatum

Binomial name
- Geastrum pectinatum Pers. (1801)

Synonyms
- G. plicatum Berk. (1839); G. tenuipes Berk. (1848); G. biplicatum Berk. & M.A.Curtis (1858); G. pectinatum var. tenuipes (Berk.) Cleland & Cheel (1915)

= Geastrum pectinatum =

Species of fungus

Geastrum pectinatum
- Mycological characteristics
- Glebal hymenium
- No distinct cap
- Hymenium attachment is not applicable
- Lacks a stipe
- Spore print is brown
- Ecology is saprotrophic
- Edibility is inedible

Geastrum pectinatum is a species of fungus in the earthstar family. It is commonly known as the beaked earthstar or the beret earthstar, in reference to the shape of the spore sac and its prominent, protruding peristome.

Although young specimens are spherical, fruit body development involves the outer layer of tissue splitting open like a star into 7 to 10 pointed rays that eventually bend back to point downward, revealing a small spore sac, 1 to 2.5 cm (1/2 to 1 in) broad. The spore sac is supported by a small radially wrinkled stalk. There is a distinct conical opening (peristome) at the top of the spore sac that is up to 8 mm (3/8 in) long. The mass of spores and surrounding cells within the sac, the gleba, is dark-brown, and becomes powdery in mature specimens. The spores are spherical, measuring 4 to 6 micrometers in diameter, with warts on their surfaces. Like several other earthstars, crystals of calcium oxalate are present, thought to be involved in fruit body maturation.

G. pectinatum grows on the ground in open woods. Although uncommon, it has a cosmopolitan distribution and has been collected in Eurasia, the Americas, Australia, and Africa. It is inedible.

== Taxonomy ==
Christian Hendrik Persoon published the first description of Geastrum pectinatum in 1801. In 1860, Miles Joseph Berkeley and Moses Ashley Curtis described the species Geastrum biplicatum (originally named Geaster biplicatus), based on specimens sent to them by Charles Wright that he obtained from the Bonin Islands during the North Pacific Exploring and Surveying Expedition. Japanese mycologist Sanshi Imai considered this identical with G. pectinatum in a 1936 publication. In 1959, mycologist J. T. Palmer reported comparing the original specimen collected by Persoon with fresh samples of what were then thought to be the distinct species G. plicatum and G. tenuipes (named by English naturalist Miles Joseph Berkeley in 1838 and 1848, respectively) and concluded the three specimens were synonymous; the original Persoon specimen was then designated as the neotype.

In Ponce de Leon's classification of Geastrum, he placed the species in the subgenus Geastrum, section Geastrum, as the type of the subsection Sulcostomata, group Pectinatum. Other species in this group—characterized by a determinate peristome surrounded by a groove—are G. xerophilum, and G. furfuraceum. In Stanek's (1958) infrageneric concept, G. pectinatum is placed in section Perimyceliata (encompassing species whereby the mycelial layer covers the entire endoperidium), in subsection Glabrostomata, which includes species with plicate peristomes.

The specific epithet is derived from the Latin pectinatum, "like a comb". Its common names include the "beaked earthstar" or the "beret earthstar". Samuel Frederick Gray called it the "comblike shell-puff" in his 1821 "A Natural Arrangement of British Plants".

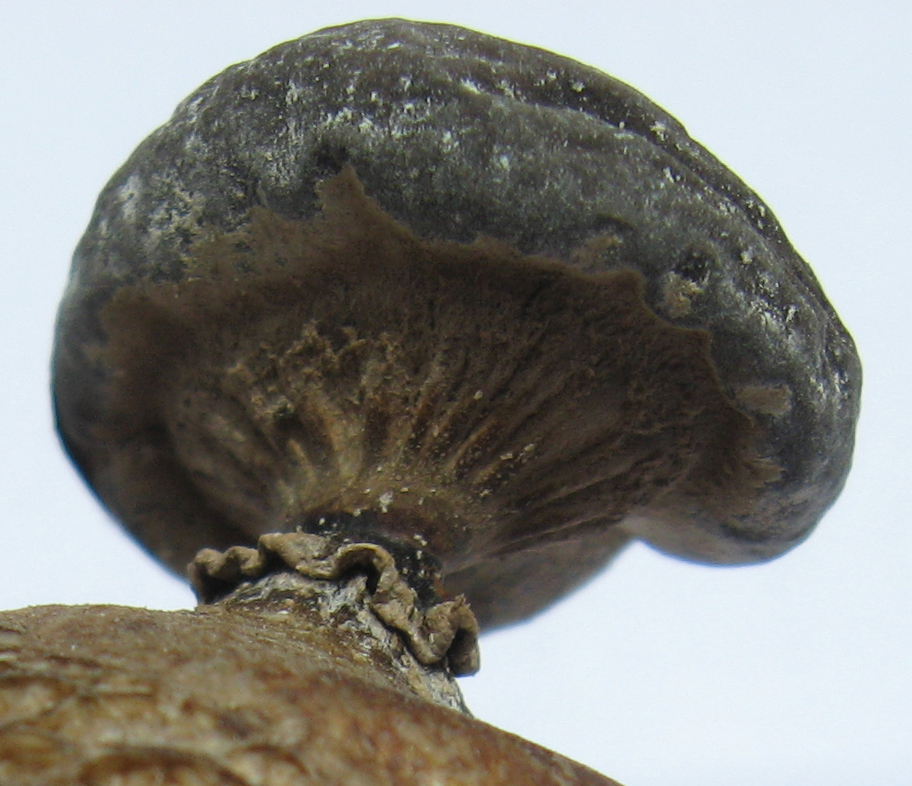
Close-up of pedicel and underside of spore sac

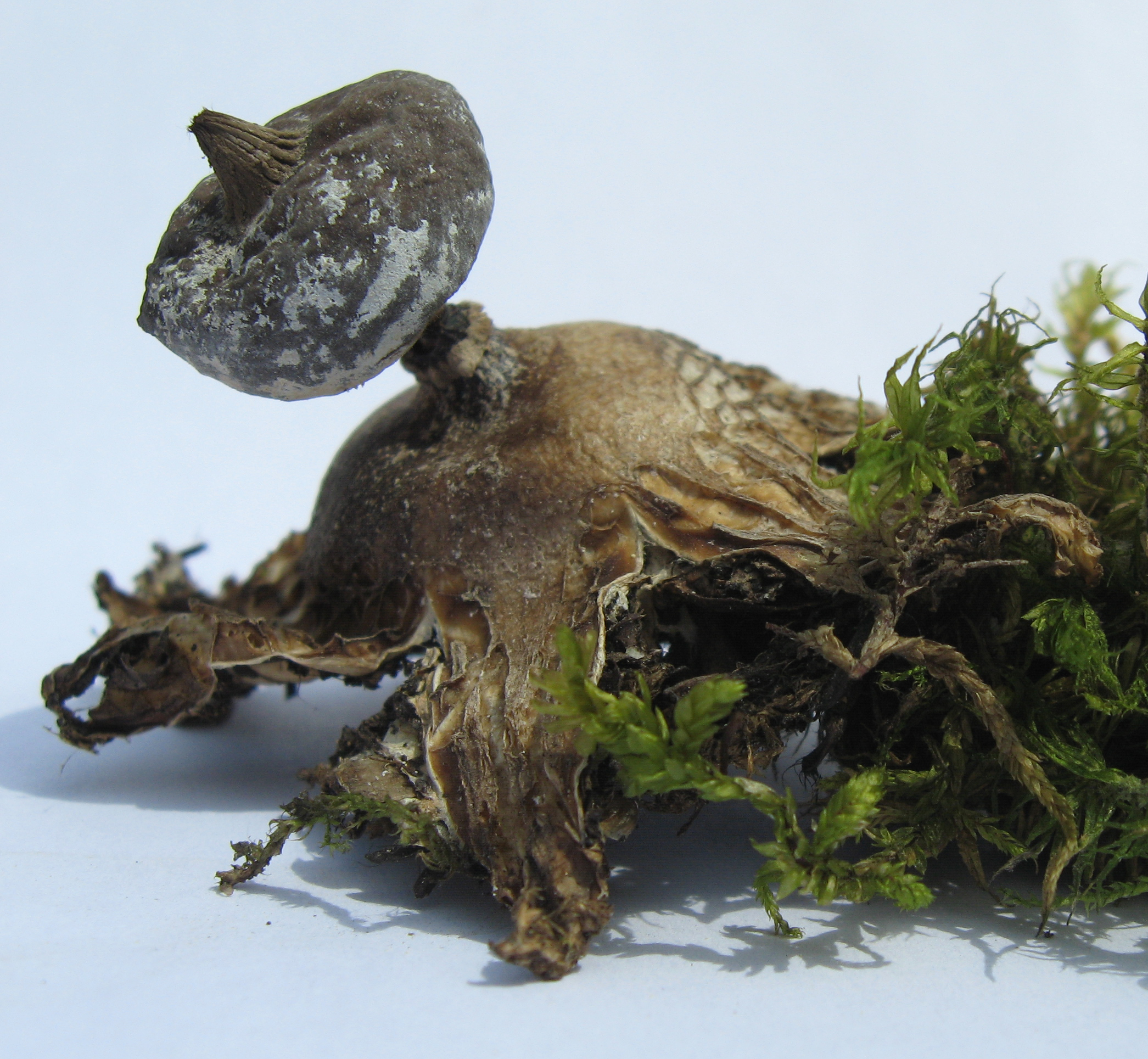
Herbarium specimen

== Description ==
Immature specimens are 1 to 2 cm (1/2 to 3/4 in) across and roughly spherical. They begin their development submerged in the ground, but gradually emerge with maturity. The young outer surface is covered with mycelia, which forms a soft, fluffy coat that holds soil and debris. The young fruit bodies often have a rounded knob or protuberance. Like other members of genus Geastrum, G. pectinatum has a fruit body wall that is multilayered. At maturity, the outer layer (the exoperidium) splits open from the top in a stellate (star-shaped) manner into 7–9 rays that support the spore sac contained within the inner wall (the endoperidium). The expanded specimens are up to 5 cm (2 in) broad and 6 cm (2 1/4 in) tall. The rays of the exoperidium bend back (reflex), simultaneously elevating the spore sac above the ground in what is known as the fornicate condition; this position exposes the spore sac to more air currents, aiding spore dispersal. The surface of the rays often crack to reveal lighter-colored areas, especially along the edges. Together with a well-developed layer of mycelium, the rays are typically bound to fragments of earth or forest duff.

The tough and membranous endoperidium comprising the spore sac, purple-brown in color and 0.5 to 1.5 cm (1/4 to 1/2 in) tall by 1 to 2.5 cm (1/2 to 1 in) wide, is supported by a small stalk—a pedicel—that is 3–4 mm (1/8–3/16 in) long by 7–10 mm (1/4–3/8 in) wide and which has a grooved (sulcate) apophysis, or swelling. This ring-shaped swelling is made of remnants from a tissue called the pseudoparenchymatous layer. When fresh, the pseudoparenchymatous layer is whitish in color, thick and fleshy; it dries to become brown to dark brown while shrinking and often splitting and peeling. The endoperidium may be pruinose—covered with fine, white, powder—although the presence of this characteristic has been noted as being somewhat variable. The spore sac is opened by a single apical pore atop a conical "beak", or peristome. The peristome is pectinate—made of tissue that resembles the teeth of a comb; the specific epithet is named after this characteristic. The peristome is 2 to 5 mm (0.08 to 0.20 in) long, and comprises 20–32 distinct ridges. The mass of spores and surrounding cells within the sac, the gleba, is dark-brown, and becomes powdery in mature specimens. Internally, the endoperidium contains a structure called the columella that is narrowly conical in shape, whitish or pale brown, and extends more than halfway into the gleba. G. pectinatum has no distinguishable odor or taste; like other earthstar mushrooms, it is inedible, and of "no alimentary interest".

=== Microscopic characteristics ===
The spores of G. pectinatum are brown and opaque. They have a roughly spherical shape and are ornamented with transparent (hyaline), truncate warts; the diameter is 4–4.5 μm, or 5.5–6.5 if the lengths of the warts is included. Spore-bearing cells, the basidia, are 2- or 4-spored, while cystidia (specialized sterile cells that occur at the hymenial surface in some mushrooms) are absent. The capillitia—a mass of thread-like sterile fibers dispersed among the spores—are light brown and 3–7 μm in diameter. They are tapered, thick-walled with a narrow interior, and either smooth or slightly encrusted.

Calcium oxalate is a common crystalline compound found in many fungi, including the earthstars. The presence of calcium oxalate crystals—apparent as a whitish powder on the surface of the spore sac—has been verified for G. pectinatum using scanning electron microscopy. The calcium oxalate crystals occur in the tetragonal form, known as weddellite. A study on the related species Geastrum saccatum has shown that these crystals are responsible for the characteristic opening (dehiscence) of the outer peridial layers. The formation of calcium oxalate crystals stretches the layers of the outer walls, pushing apart the inner and outer layers of the peridium.

=== Similar species ===
Geastrum pectinatum has been mistaken for the morphologically similar but smaller species G. schmidelii. The latter species lacks vertical striations on the basal portions of the endoperidium, and does not have a pseudoparenchymatous collar around the stem. Another similar species, G. berkeleyi, has a shorter stem and is missing the ridges at the base of the spore sac. Further, the color of its spore sac is usually brown, in contrast to the gray-blue of G. pectinatum. G. xerophilum also has a dusting of white powder on the surface of the spore sac, but unlike G. pectinatum, consistently lacks a ring at the base of the pedicel; furthermore, in contrast to G. pectinatum, the spores of G. xerophilum are yellow and contain oil drops that are readily observable with a microscope. G. striatum has smaller fruit bodies than G. pectinatum, and a distinct collar-like apophysis.

== Habitat and distribution ==
This species has been reported to grow solitary or in groups on sandy soil or rich composted soil in both mixed and coniferous forests, often beneath cedars. In Hawaii, it is usually found growing in duff under coastal Casuarina and groves of Cupressus. The species has been noted to occur in late summer and autumn (in Britain and Europe), but the fruit bodies may dry and persist for some time.

Geastrum pectinatum has a cosmopolitan distribution. It has been reported from Australia, and New Zealand, Africa (the Congo and South Africa) Central America (Costa Rica), Asia (Northeastern China and Japan), and South America (Brazil). In Europe, it has been reported from Belgium, Ireland, Germany, the Netherlands, Norway, and Sweden. In the Middle East, it has been recorded in Israel, and Turkey. In North America, it is known from the United States (including Hawaii), Canada, and Mexico. It is in the Red Data Book (documenting rare and endangered species) of Latvia, and is considered a threatened species in Poland. North American sources gives its frequency of appearance as "rare", but Stellan Sunhede, in his 1989 monograph on the Geastraceae, considers it one of the most common earthstar mushrooms of northern Europe.
