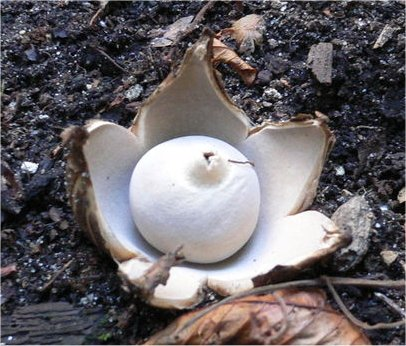

Scientific classification
- Kingdom: Fungi
- Division: Basidiomycota
- Class: Agaricomycetes
- Order: Geastrales
- Family: Geastraceae
- Genus: Geastrum
- Species: G. fimbriatum

Binomial name
- Geastrum fimbriatum Fr. (1829)

Synonyms
- Geastrum rufescens var. minor Pers. (1801); Geaster tunicatus Vittad. (1842); Geastrum tunicatum Vittad. (1842)

= Geastrum fimbriatum =

Geastrum fimbriatum
- Mycological characteristics
- Glebal hymenium
- No distinct cap
- Hymenium attachment is not applicable
- Lacks a stipe
- Spore print is brown
- Ecology is saprotrophic
- Edibility is inedible

Geastrum fimbriatum, commonly known as the fringed earthstar or the sessile earthstar, is an inedible species of mushroom belonging to the genus Geastrum, or earthstar fungi.

First described in 1829, it is distinguished from other earthstars by the delicate fibers that line the circular pore at the top of its spore sac. The species has a widespread distribution, being found in Eurasia and the Americas.

== Taxonomy ==
Elias Magnus Fries described Geastrum fimbriatum (as Geaster fimbriatus) in his 1829 Systema mycologicum.

It is commonly known as the fringed earthstar or the sessile earthstar. The specific epithet fimbriatum means "fringed", referring to the characteristic edge of the apical spore of the spore sac.

== Description ==
The fruit bodies of G. fimbriatum start out roughly spherical and hypogeous. As it matures, it pushed up through the soil and the other layer of the spore case (exoperidium) splits open to form between 5 and 8 rays that curve downward. The fully expanded fruit body has a diameter of up to 3 centimetres (1 1/4 in). Before expansion, the outer surface has a cottony surface with adherent soil particles; this ultimately peels off to reveal a smooth, grayish-brown surface. The inner spore sac is yellowish brown and features a small conical pore with fringed edges. Unlike other similar earthstar fungi, the edges of this pore are not sharply delimited from the rest of the spore sac, and do not have grooves. The fruit bodies have no distinctive taste or odor.

The spores are spherical, roughened by many small points or warts, and measure 2.4–4 μm. The capillitium is thick-walled, unbranched, and 4–7 μm thick.

=== Similar species ===
Similar species include G. saccatum, which is larger – up to 5 cm (2 in) across – and has a clearly delimited ring-like area around the pore opening. G. rufescens has reddish tones that are absent from G. fimbriatum.

== Habitat and distribution ==
Geastrum fimbriatum is a saprobic species, and it fruit bodies grow on the ground in groups or clusters, usually near the stumps of hardwood trees. It is found in Europe, Asia (India and Mongolia), eastern North America (including Mexico), Central America (Costa Rica), and South America (Brazil).

== Uses ==
Although typically listed by field guides as an inedible species, it is eaten by the tribal peoples of Madhya Pradesh.

== In culture ==
The species was depicted in a Nigerien postage stamp in 1985.
