= Geastrum leptospermum =

Scientific classification
- Domain: Eukaryota
- Kingdom: Fungi
- Division: Basidiomycota
- Class: Agaricomycetes
- Order: Geastrales
- Family: Geastraceae
- Genus: Geastrum
- Species: G. leptospermum

Binomial name
- Geastrum leptospermum G.F.Atk. & Coker (1903)

Synonyms
- Geaster leptospermus

Species of fungus

Geastrum leptospermum Mycological characteristics
- Glebal hymenium
- No distinct cap
- Spore print is brown
- Ecology is saprotrophic
- Edibility is inedible

Geastrum leptospermum is a species of fungus in the family Geastraceae. It was first described scientifically by American mycologist George F. Atkinson in 1903. The fungus produces small fruit bodies and grows in mosses on tree trunks.

== Description ==
The inner peridium, or spore sac, is nearly spherical, 2.5–5 millimetres (1/8–3/16 inch) thick, pale gray to pale tan in color, and dusted with fine whitish particles that also cover the inner surface of the freshly opened rays. The mouth on the apex of the peridium is very small, minutely fibrous, and surrounded by a conical, white disc which is distinctly outlined and radially fibrous (if not deeply grooved). As the fruit body matures, the fibrous layer of the outer peridium splits, star-like, into three to six rays about halfway down or more. The fungus is fornicate, meaning that the rays curve downward so that the base of the fruit body becomes arched up, which elevates the spore sac.

The delicate, fibrous mycelial layer is a distinct, membranous, white cup on the underside, with its margin also rayed by slits, the rays attached to the rays of the plant above. When freshly opened, the inner surface of the rays is covered with a fleshy, pale buff, layer of tissue. This layer, when dry, forms the thin, tan or light brown, smooth and nearly complete membrane over the fibrous layer. The underside of the rays is white and smooth. There is no obvious columella (sterile tissue in the base of the gleba that extends into the gleba).

The spores are spherical and measure 2–3 μm. Under high-power microscopy they appear as having a surface that is roughened by many small points or warts. The capillitium (coarse, thick-walled cells in the gleba) threads are unbranched, and measure about 3 μm thick. Both the spores and the capillitium are whitish to very pale yellow-brown.
