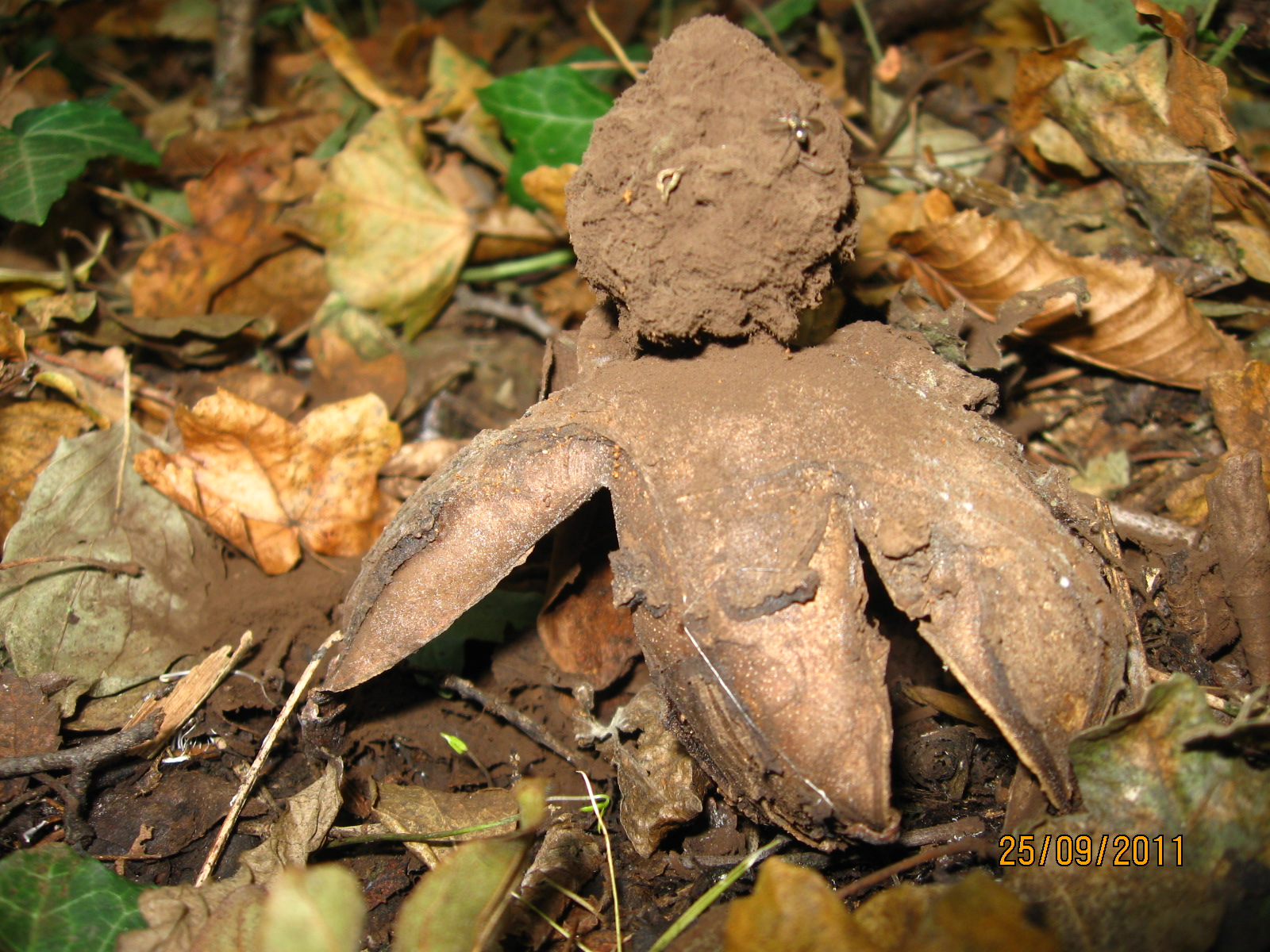

Scientific classification
- Kingdom: Fungi
- Division: Basidiomycota
- Class: Agaricomycetes
- Order: Geastrales
- Family: Geastraceae
- Genus: Geastrum
- Species: G. melanocephalum

Binomial name
- Geastrum melanocephalum (Czern.) V.J.Staněk (1956)

Synonyms
- Trichaster melanocephalus Czern. (1845); Geastrum melanocephalum f. pilatii V.J.Staněk (1958)

= Geastrum melanocephalum =

Species of fungus

Geastrum melanocephalum is a species of earthstar fungus belonging to the family Geastraceae. It has been put on the Red List of threatened macrofungi in Poland, where it is in danger of extinction.

== Taxonomy ==
Geastrum melanocephalum was originally described as Trichaster melanocephalus by the Russian botanist and mycologist Vassilii Czernajew in 1845, based on specimens collected in Ukraine. Czerniaiev established the genus Trichaster with this species as the type. The species epithet melanocephalum derives from the Ancient Greek words (μέλας "black" and κεφαλή "head"), referring to the dark gleba that becomes exposed when the endoperidium ruptures.

The taxonomic status of this fungus has been subject to debate for over a century. In 1913, the Hungarian mycologist László Hollós questioned Czerniaiev's classification, suggesting that Trichaster melanocephalus merely represented abnormal forms of Geastrum triplex with lost and torn inner spore sacs. Hollós noted morphological similarities between the species, particularly the distinctive "collar" that forms on the pseudoparenchymatous layer of the exoperidium.

In 1925, Heinrich Lohwag conducted a comparative study of Geastrum and Trichaster and demonstrated that T. melanocephalus was a distinct species, though he did not treat it as an independent genus. The current classification was established in 1956 when the Czech mycologist Václav Stančk recombined the species into the genus Geastrum, creating the new combination Geastrum melanocephalum. This classification has since been accepted by numerous mycologists. Molecular phylogenetics analyses have also confirmed this placement, demonstrating that G. melanocephalum is nested within the genus Geastrum and is most closely related to European and North American populations of G. triplex.

== Description ==
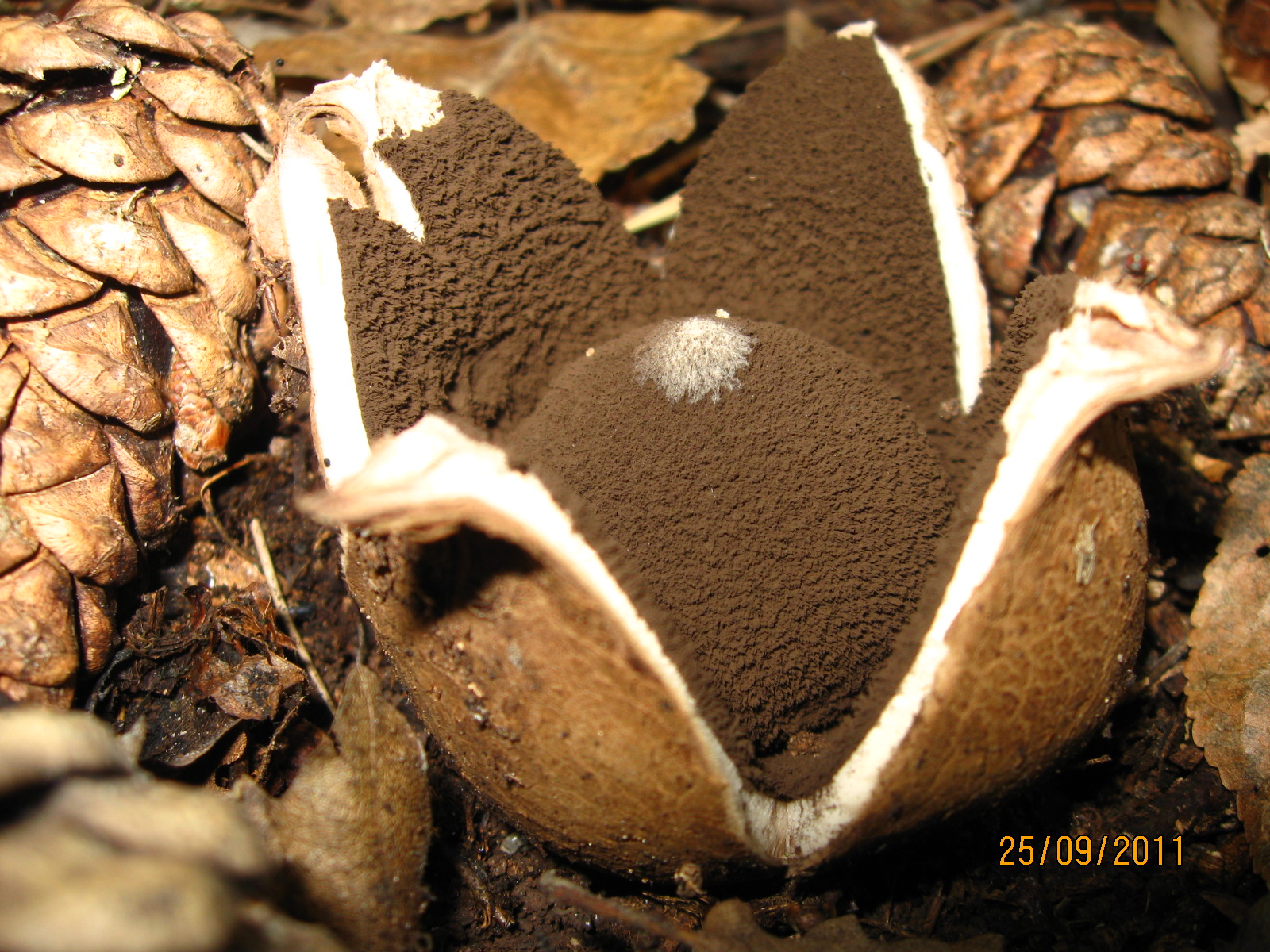
View of dark brown gleba

Geastrum melanocephalum produces medium to large basidiomata (fruiting bodies) that undergo dramatic morphological changes as they mature. When young, the fruiting bodies are epigeous (growing above ground), rounded, and often onion-shaped, measuring up to 12 cm in diameter. They typically feature a smooth, cracked, or scaly outer surface that is not encrusted with debris, and may have an umbo (raised knob) at the apex. A distinct characteristic is that the surface turns violet when damaged in fresh specimens.

As the fungus matures, the exoperidium (outer wall) splits into 4–8 rays (occasionally up to 13) that arch outward, often forming a characteristic "collar" similar to that seen in Geastrum triplex. The most distinctive feature of G. melanocephalum is its evanescent (quickly disappearing) endoperidium (inner spore sac), which bursts open during development. This results in the complete exposure of the naked gleba (spore mass) and reveals a prominent, stout columella (central column) with a short stalk beneath it.

The basidiospores are dark brown, globose to subglobose (nearly spherical), densely to coarsely verrucose (warty), and measure approximately 4–5.5 μm in diameter. The surface ornamentation consists of verrucae (warts) up to 1 μm high with flat or somewhat rounded tips.

== Habitat and distribution ==
Geastrum melanocephalum is primarily a Eurasian species with a distribution spanning across Europe and extending into Central and Eastern Asia. The fungus demonstrates specific habitat preferences, typically growing in well-drained, calcareous, sandy, and alkaline environments within dry to humid temperate zones. Collection sites have been documented across much of Europe, including Belgium, Czechoslovakia (now Czech Republic and Slovakia), Denmark, Germany, Hungary, Poland, Serbia, Spain, Sweden, and Ukraine (where it was first described). In Asia, specimens have been recorded from Kazakhstan and the desert regions of Western China.

Unlike many other fungi in its order, G. melanocephalum does not appear to form mycorrhizal relationships with trees or other plants. It grows as a saprotroph, obtaining nutrients by decomposing organic matter in the soil. This ecological strategy is consistent with most other members of the order Geastrales, which are predominantly saprotrophic. The fungus typically appears in open habitats rather than dense forest environments. Despite its saprotrophic nature (which often allows for widespread distribution due to less dependence on specific plant hosts), molecular studies suggest that the distribution and dispersal of Geastrum species, including G. melanocephalum, may be restricted by geographic and environmental conditions such as climate, soil properties, and vegetation types.

Phylogeographic evidence indicates that Swedish populations of G. melanocephalum likely originated in northern Europe, supporting the hypothesis that the species has a primarily Northern Hemisphere lineage.
