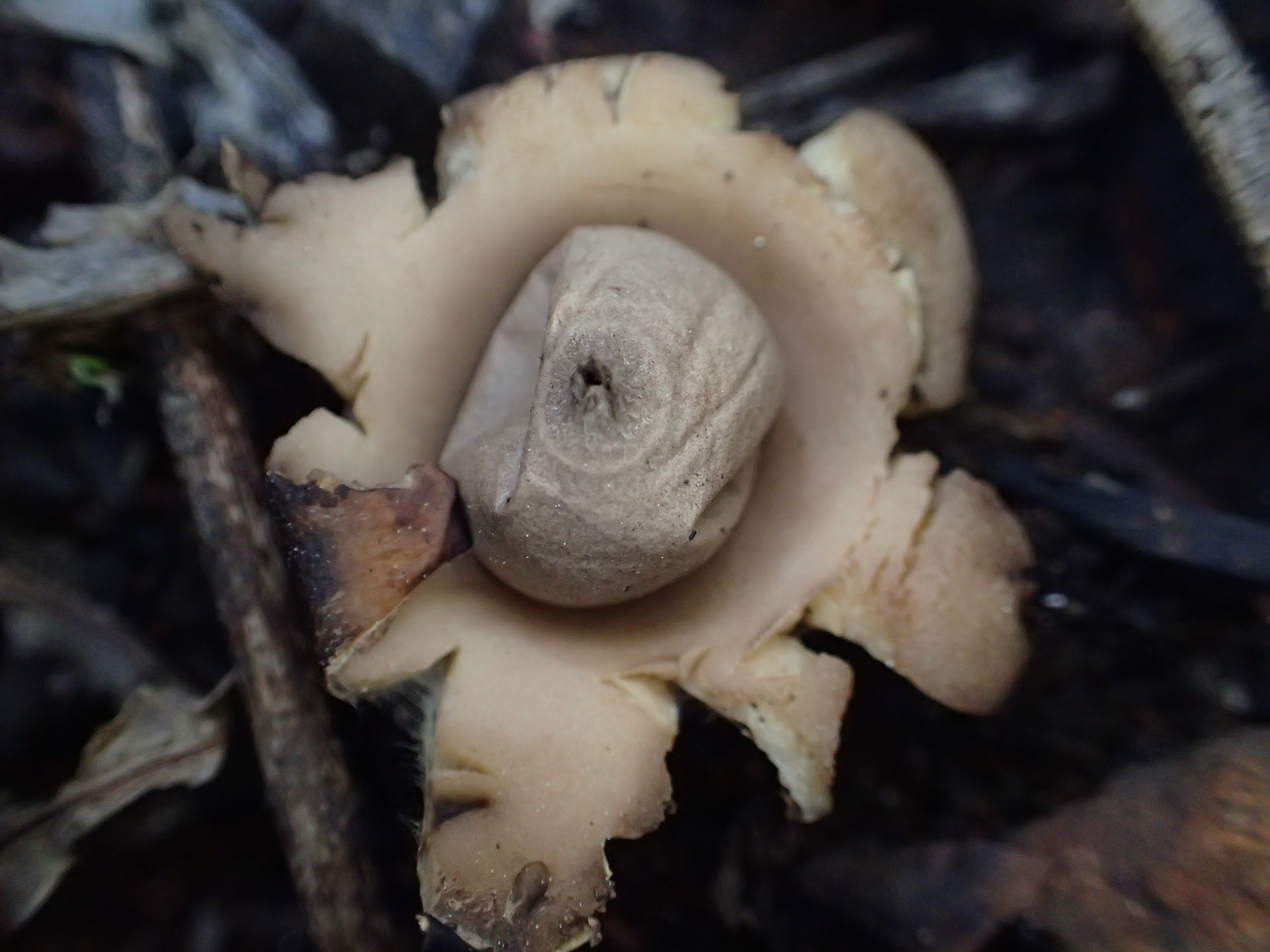

Scientific classification
- Domain: Eukaryota
- Kingdom: Fungi
- Division: Basidiomycota
- Class: Agaricomycetes
- Order: Geastrales
- Family: Geastraceae
- Genus: Geastrum
- Species: G. australe

Binomial name
- Geastrum australe Berk. (1859)

= Geastrum australe =

Geastrum australe Mycological characteristics
- Glebal hymenium
- No distinct cap
- Hymenium attachment is not applicable
- Lacks a stipe
- Spore print is brown
- Ecology is saprotrophic
- Edibility is inedible

Geastrum australe is an inedible species of mushroom belonging to the genus Geastrum, or earthstar fungi. It can be mistaken for G. saccatum or G. simulans, and is found in Melbourne.
