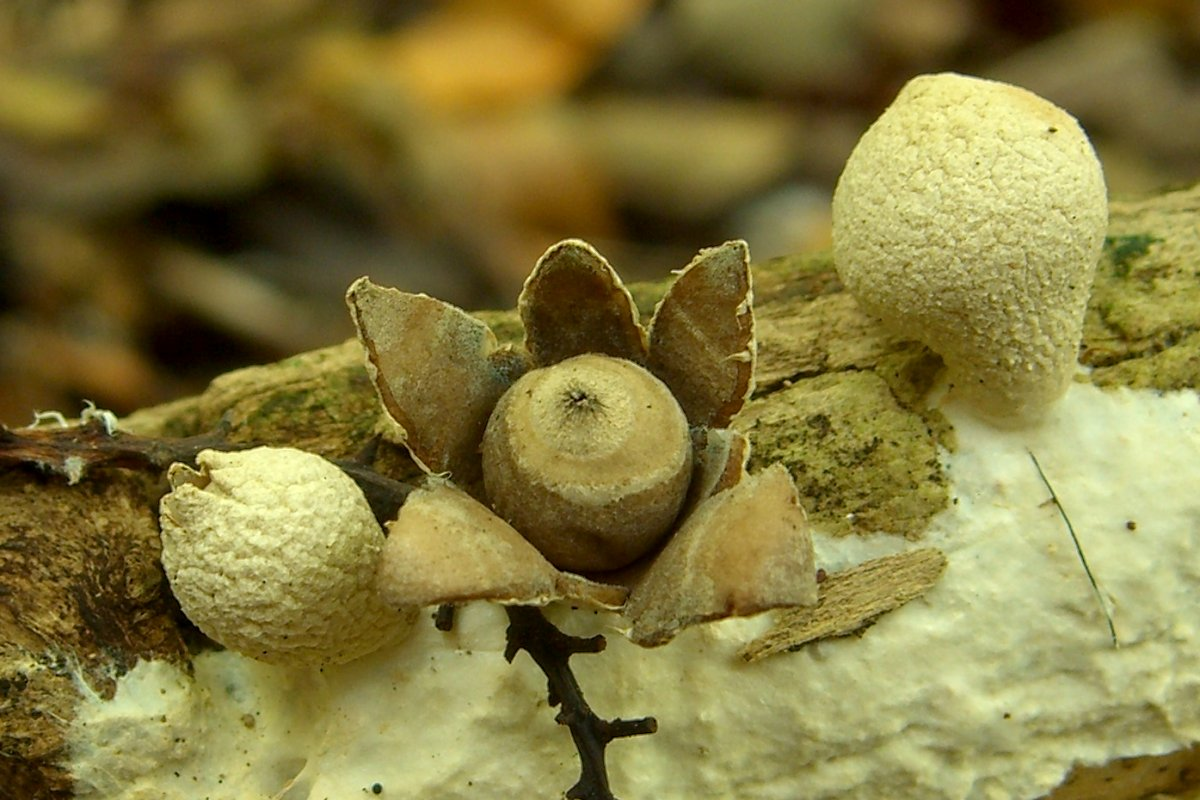

Scientific classification
- Domain: Eukaryota
- Kingdom: Fungi
- Division: Basidiomycota
- Class: Agaricomycetes
- Order: Geastrales
- Family: Geastraceae
- Genus: Geastrum
- Species: G. subiculosum

Binomial name
- Geastrum subiculosum Cooke & Massee (1887)

= Geastrum subiculosum =

Species of fungus

Geastrum subiculosum is an inedible species of fungus belonging to the genus Geastrum, or earthstar fungi. The fungus was first described scientifically by Cooke and Massee in 1887 (as Geaster subiculosus; Geaster is an older name for the genus Geastrum), based on material found near Trinity Bay, Australia. The fungus grows on decaying wood, and the fruit bodies are characterized by an extensive velvet-like subiculum (a crust-like growth of mycelium). The spores are roughly spherical and measure 3.6–4.2 μm. The species is found in Australia, Africa (South Africa and the Congo), North America, and South America.
