= Geastrum britannicum =

Scientific classification
- Kingdom: Fungi
- Division: Basidiomycota
- Class: Agaricomycetes
- Order: Geastrales
- Family: Geastraceae
- Genus: Geastrum
- Species: G. britannicum

Binomial name
- Geastrum britannicum J.C. Zamora (2015)

Genus of fungus

Geastrum britannicum is a fungal species in the family Geastraceae. Its recommended English name is vaulted earthstar. Like other earthstars, the basidiocarps (fruit bodies) are initially globose. Their thick outer skin splits open at maturity to expose the puffball-like spore sac surrounded by the split rays of the outer skin. In the vaulted earthstar, the rays split apart and form an arch, raising the spore sac upwards.

== Taxonomy ==
Geastrum britannicum was described in 2015 from England by Spanish mycologist Juan Carlos Zamora, based on a holotype found on a roadside verge in Cockley Cley under pine trees in 2000 by Jonathan Revett, with paratypes from New Milton and Surlingham. The species was already the subject of research at the Royal Botanic Gardens, Kew, where more than a dozen additional collections had been studied from England and Wales, the earliest dating back to 1994. The new species had previously been confused with G. quadrifidum and G. fornicatum, both of which have a similar vaulted or arched appearance. Geastrum britannicum was distinguished on the basis of morphology and DNA sequence analysis.

== Distribution ==
The fungus has proved to be very widespread in England and Wales. It was more recently found in the Czech Republic and Slovakia. Since the species is not known to have occurred in Europe before 1994, it may be a recent arrival.
