= Friedrich Welwitsch =

Austrian botanist and explorer (1806–1872)

Friedrich Martin Josef Welwitsch
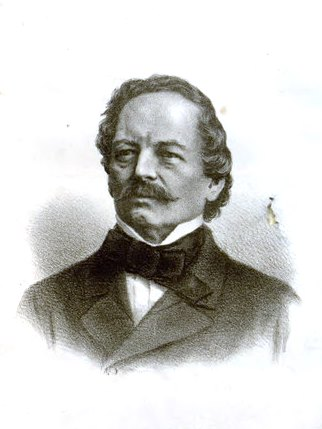
- Born: February 25, 1806; Maria Saal, Austrian Empire
- Died: October 20, 1872 (aged 66); London, United Kingdom
- Occupations: botanist, explorer
- Known for: discovery of Welwitschia
- Scientific career
- Author abbrev. (botany): Welw.

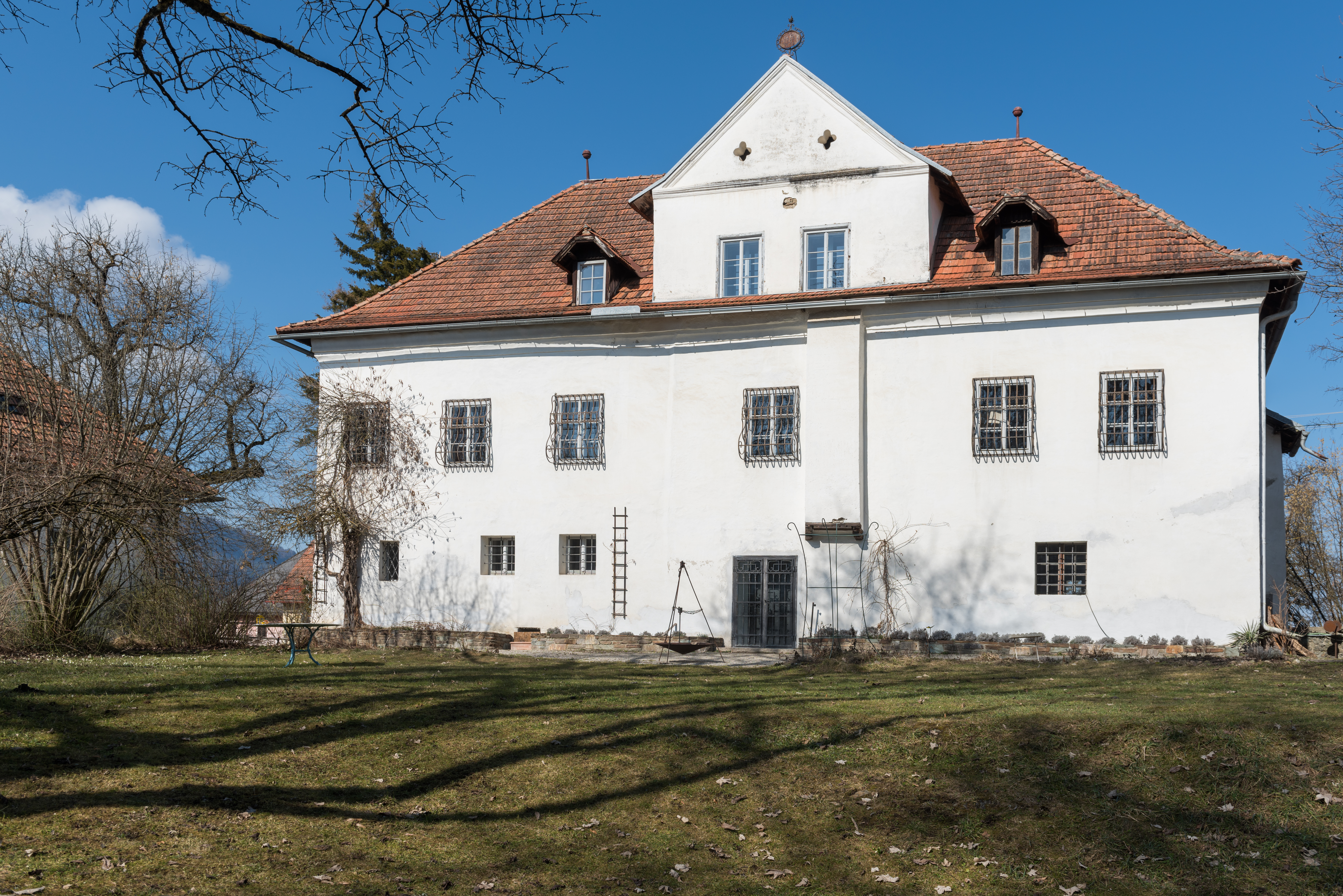
Tonhof in Maria Saal, the birthplace of Friedrich Welwitsch

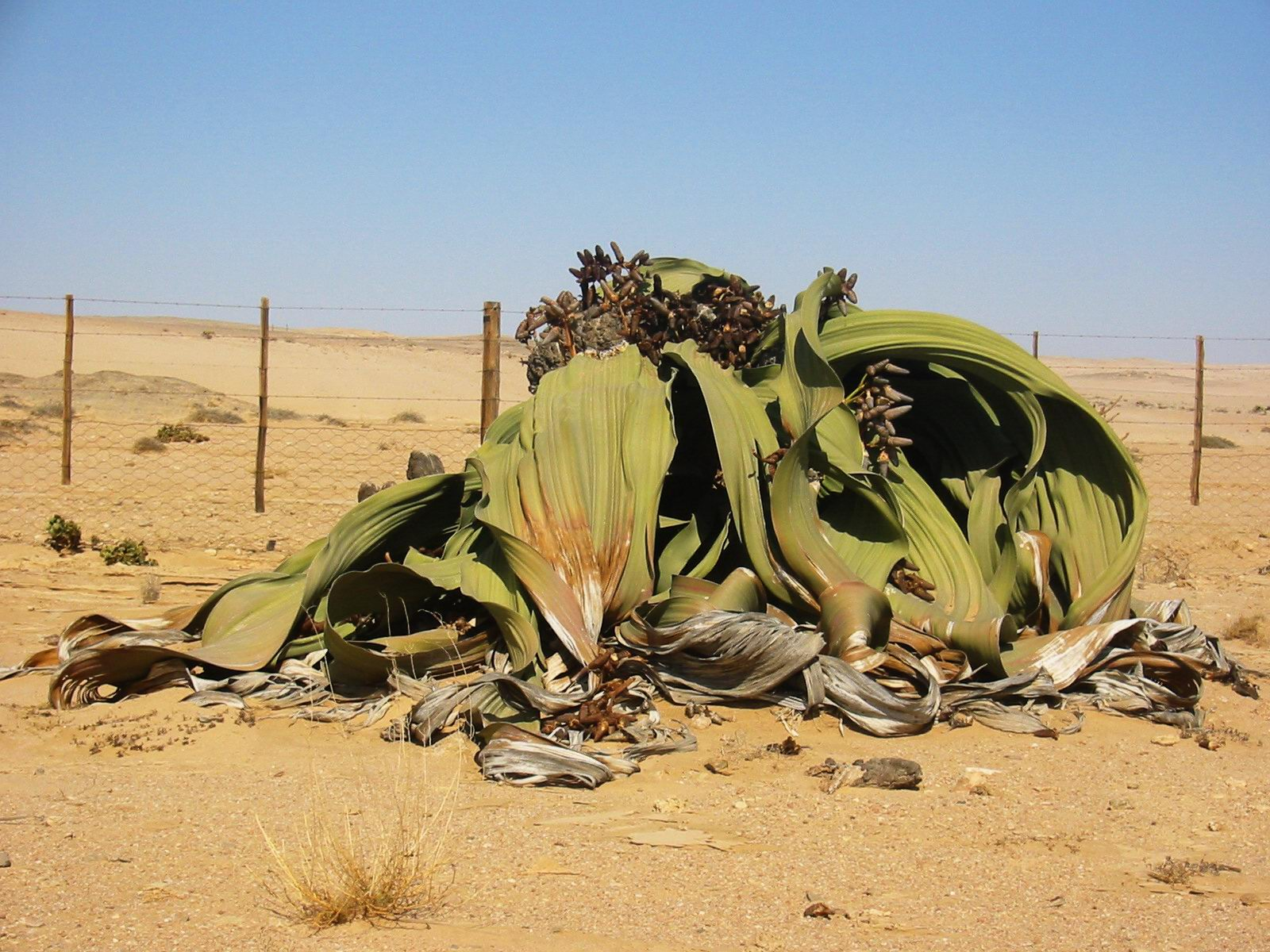
Welwitschia mirabilis was discovered and named after Friedrich Welwitsch

Friedrich Martin Josef Welwitsch (25 February 1806 – 20 October 1872) was an Austrian Empire explorer and botanist who in Angola was the first European to describe the plant Welwitschia mirabilis. His report received wide attention among the botanists and general public, comparable only to the discovery of two other plants in the 19th century, namely Victoria amazonica and Rafflesia arnoldii.

In Angola, Welwitsch also discovered Rhipsalis baccifera, the only cactus species naturally occurring outside the New World. It was found a few years later in Sri Lanka too, which reignited the now already one-and-a-half-century-old debate on the origin of cacti in Africa and Asia. At the time, the debate concluded with the conviction of numerous authors that they were introduced and spread by migratory birds.

Among the botanists, Welwitsch is also known after his descriptions of numerous other plants, for example Cyphostemma macropus (common name: Butter Tree), Tavaresia angolensis (common name: Devil's Trumpet), Dorstenia psilurus, Sarcocaulon mossamedense, Acanthosicyos horridus, Pachypodium namaquanum and Pachypodium lealii. The earthstar fungus Geastrum welwitschii, a species he collected in Portugal, is named in his honor. The standard author abbreviation Welw. is used to indicate this person as the author when citing a botanical name.

Botanical specimens collected by Welwitsch are now found in herbaria around the world, including the Natural History Museum, London, Kew Herbarium, the National Museum of Natural History and the National Herbarium of Victoria (MEL), Royal Botanic Gardens Victoria.

== Biography ==
Friedrich Welwitsch was born at Maria Saal (Slovene: Gospa Sveta), Duchy of Carinthia, Austrian Empire, to the wealthy family of Joseph Anton Welwich, a local judicial officer and town councillor of Salzburg, and Genovefa Mayr. The family name, which in today's Slovene spelling would be Velbič, points at Slovene ethnicity. It is known that Welwitsch's mother was a German, while his father's family was probably of Slovene origin. However, this has not been definitely proven. It is not known whether Welwitsch spoke Slovene, although he worked as a physician in a Slovene-speaking environment for two years. This was in Postojna, where he continued to develop his interest in cryptogamic flora.

Contrary to the wishes of his father, who wanted him to study law, Friedrich Welwitsch studied medicine and botany in Vienna and worked as a physician in the Austrian provinces of Carniola and Moravia, but his interest in the plant kingdom, where he discovered a number of plants hitherto unknown, was so great that in 1839 he abandoned the medical profession altogether.

With the financial aid of a Württemberg botanical association Welwitsch travelled to Portugal where he became the director of the botanical gardens. His first collections were distributed in 1841 by the Unio Itineraria as exsiccata-like series under the title Welwitschii iter Lusitanicum. Unio itineraria 1841. Later on he distributed two series with cryptogams from Portugal, i.e. Cryptotheca Lusitana and Phycotheca Lusitana. His claim to fame came when with the further support of the Portuguese agent of the Württemberg botanical society he did research on the Canary Islands, on Madeira, and, in the interest of the Portuguese government, from 1853 in Angola, then a Portuguese colony. There, in 1859, in the Namib Desert in the southern part of Angola he discovered Welwitschia mirabilis, a unique member of the Gnetophyta, also known as Tumboa, with a subterranean stem of 50 cm diameter that can grow up to 30 meters deep, and with only two leaves of up to 2 m long, the longest-lived leaves (1,500 to 2,000 years) in the plant kingdom. This plant, whose common name is Tree tumbo, a single species of dioecious perennial, is considered a gymnosperm, however, the relationship with other species in this group is still not clear.

After eight strenuous years of exploring and collecting, Welwitsch returned to Portugal in 1861. Because of better working conditions, he went to London in 1863. There, he worked at first at the Natural History Museum and later at the Kew Gardens, categorising and cataloguing its enormous collection. Only in the publication Sertum Angolense, he described 12 new categories and 48 new species. He left his precious collection to the London Natural History Museum. However, having financed his Angolan years, the Portuguese government claimed the estate. The case was settled only after a three-year suit: one series of his collection went to Lisbon, the second remained in London. Welwitsch was buried in the Kensal Green Cemetery where the slab over his grave reads: "Frederikus Welwitsch, M.D. – Florae angolensis investigatorum princeps – Nat. in Carinthia 5 Feb 1806 – Ob. Londini 20 Oct 1872". Specimens of the Welwitsch collections from Angola were distributed after his death and found with printed blue labels entitled Welwitsch, Iter Angolense in various herbaria.

Welwitsch is commemorated in the scientific name of a species of Angolan amphisbaenian, Dalophia welwitschii, and a species of African olive, Olea welwitschii.

== Publications ==
- Beiträge zur kryptogamischen Flora Unterösterreichs. In: Beiträge zur Landeskunde Österreichs, vol.4, 1834.
- Synopsis Nostochinearum Austriae inferioris. PhD Thesis, Vienna, 1836.
- Genera Phycearum Lusitanae. (=Actas da Academia das Ciências de Lisboa), Lisbon 1850.
- Apontamentos Fito-geograficos sobre a Flora da Província de Angola na Africa Equinocial. In: Anais do Conselho do Ultramarino de oct. 1858, Lisbon 1858.
- Sinopse explicativa das amostras de Madeiras e drogas medicinais (...) coligidos na provincia de Angola, e enviados a Exposição Internacional de Londres 1862. Lisbon, 1862.
- Sertum Angolense. In: Transactions of the Linnean Societyvol. XXII, London 1869.
- Notizen über die Bryologie von Portugal. In: Flora, 1872.

== See also ==
- for plant species named for Welwitsch

== Bibliography ==
- Helmut Dolezal, Friedrich Welwitsch. PhD Thesis, Vienna 1953.
- Helmut Dolezal, Friedrich Welwitsch. Leben und Werk. In: Portugaliae Acta Biologica (B), Vol VI (1959) 257-323 and Vol VII (1960–61) 49/324-276/551.
- William Philip Hiern et al., Catalogue of the African Plants Collected by Dr. Friedrich Welwitsch in 1853-61. 2 parts in 3 vols. Printed by order of the Trustees, British Museum (Natural History), London: Longmans, Paul Kegan, Trübner & Co., 1896–1901.
  Part-Reprint: Accra, Ghana: Buck Press 2007. ISBN 978-1-4067-8044-4
- Marianne Klemun, "Friedrich Welwitsch (1806-1872). (Pflanzengeograph in Kärnten, Begründer des Herbars in Portugal und Erschließer der Flora Angolas)". In: Carinthia II, 180/100 (1990), pp. 11–30.
- Gustav Adolf Zwanziger, "Dr. Friedrich Welwitsch. Seine Reisen in Angola und sein Leben". In: Carinthia (Zeitschrift für Vaterlandskunde, Belehrung und Unterhaltung.) No. 9/10 (1882), pp. 219–248
