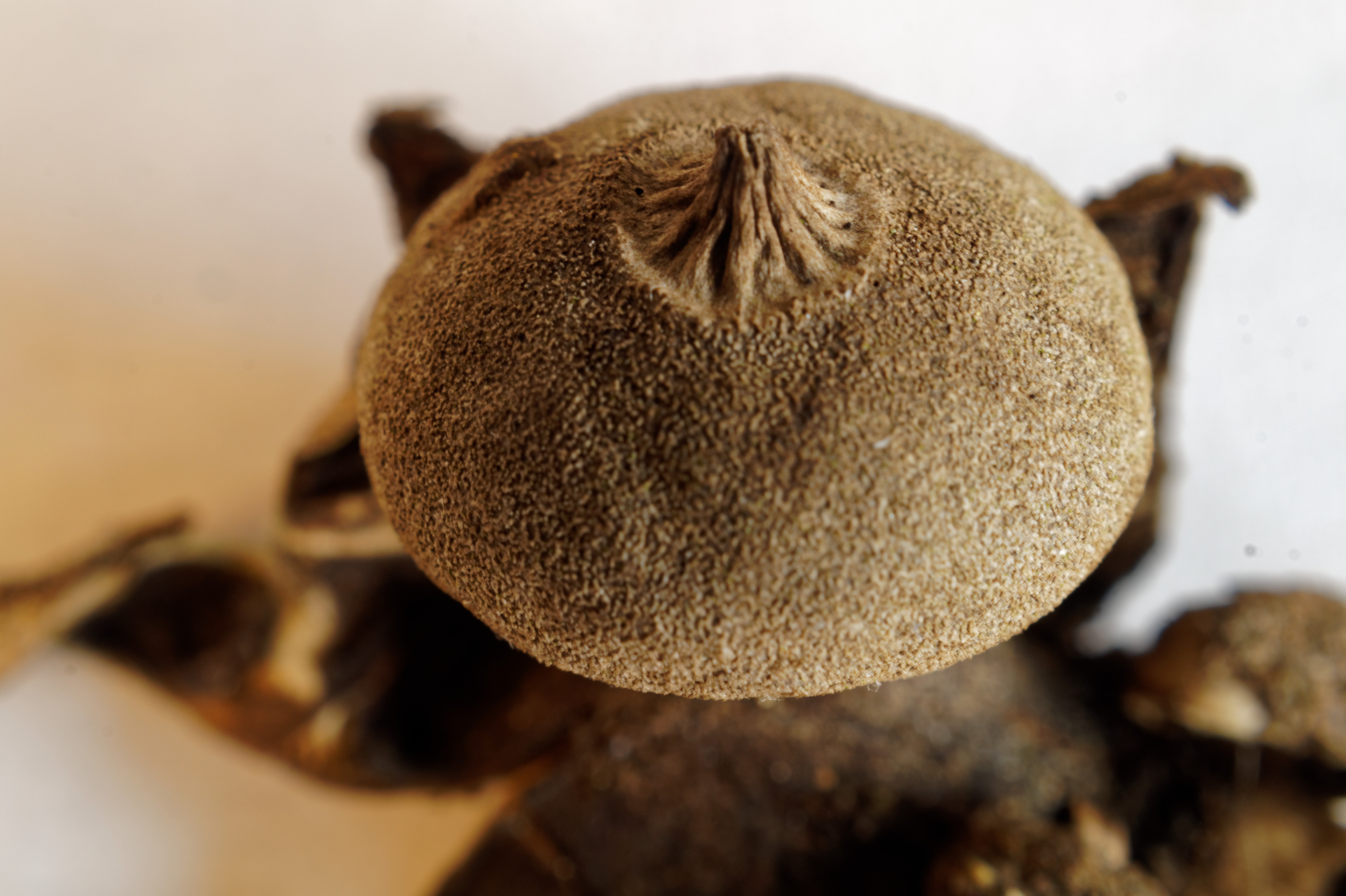

Scientific classification
- Domain: Eukaryota
- Kingdom: Fungi
- Division: Basidiomycota
- Class: Agaricomycetes
- Order: Geastrales
- Family: Geastraceae
- Genus: Geastrum
- Species: G. campestre

Binomial name
- Geastrum campestre Morgan (1887)

= Geastrum campestre =

Geastrum campestre Mycological characteristics
- Glebal hymenium
- No distinct cap
- Hymenium attachment is not applicable
- Lacks a stipe
- Spore print is brown
- Ecology is saprotrophic
- Edibility is inedible

Geastrum campestre is an inedible species of mushroom belonging to the genus Geastrum, or earthstar fungi.
