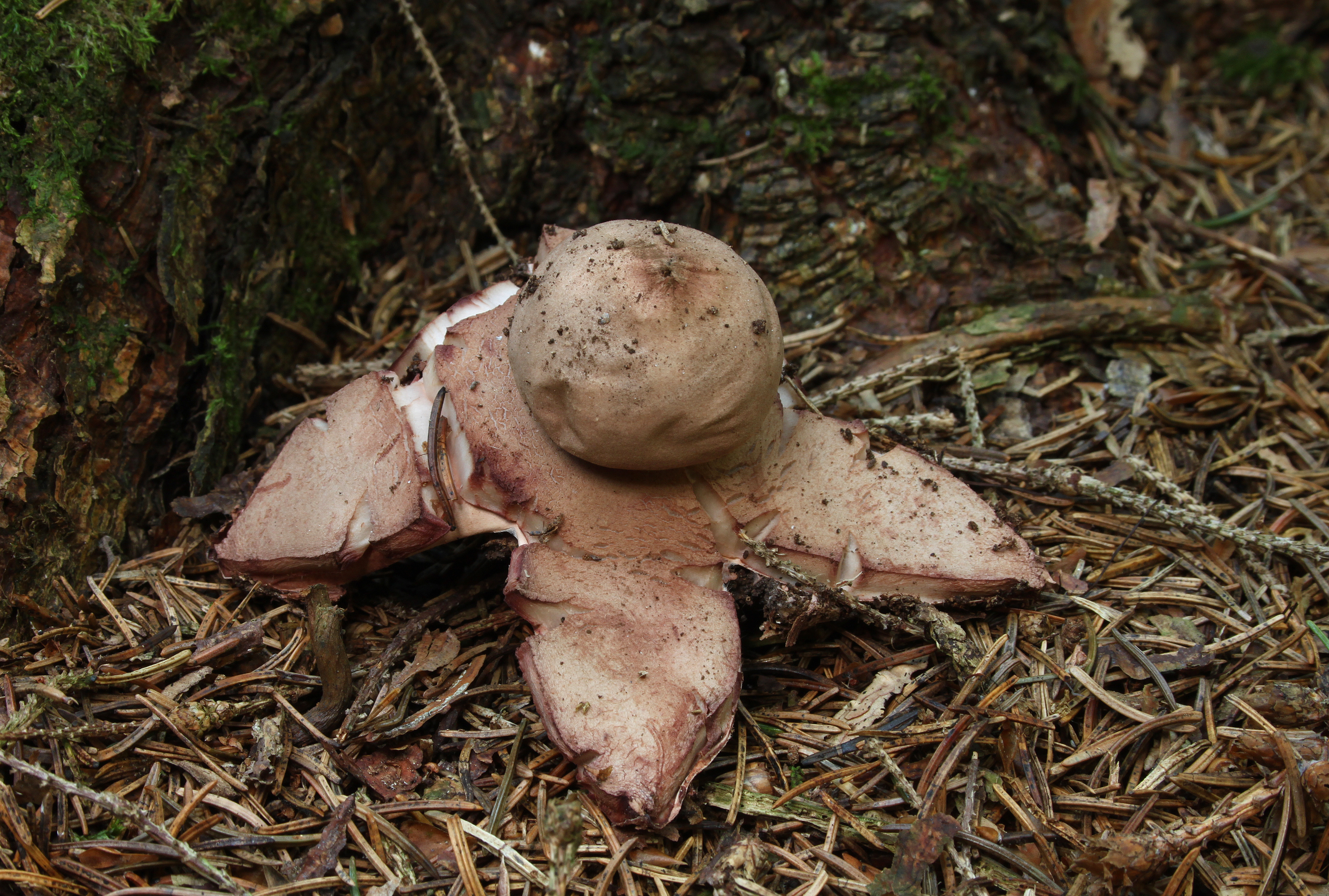

Scientific classification
- Domain: Eukaryota
- Kingdom: Fungi
- Division: Basidiomycota
- Class: Agaricomycetes
- Order: Geastrales
- Family: Geastraceae
- Genus: Geastrum
- Species: G. rufescens

Binomial name
- Geastrum rufescens Pers. (1801)

Synonyms
- Geastrum schaefferi Vittad. (1842); Geastrum vulgatum Vittad. (1842); Geastrum readeri Cooke & Massee (1888(); Geastrum rufescens var. readeri (Cooke & Massee) Cleland & Cheel (1915)

= Geastrum rufescens =

Species of fungus

Geastrum rufescens, commonly known as the rosy earthstar, is a species of fungus in the family Geastraceae. It was first described scientifically by Christian Hendrik Persoon in 1801. It has a pale pinkish-buff to pinkish exoperidium and rays. The earthstar is found in Europe, North America (including Mexico), and Japan, where it typically grows at the base of old oak stumps.
