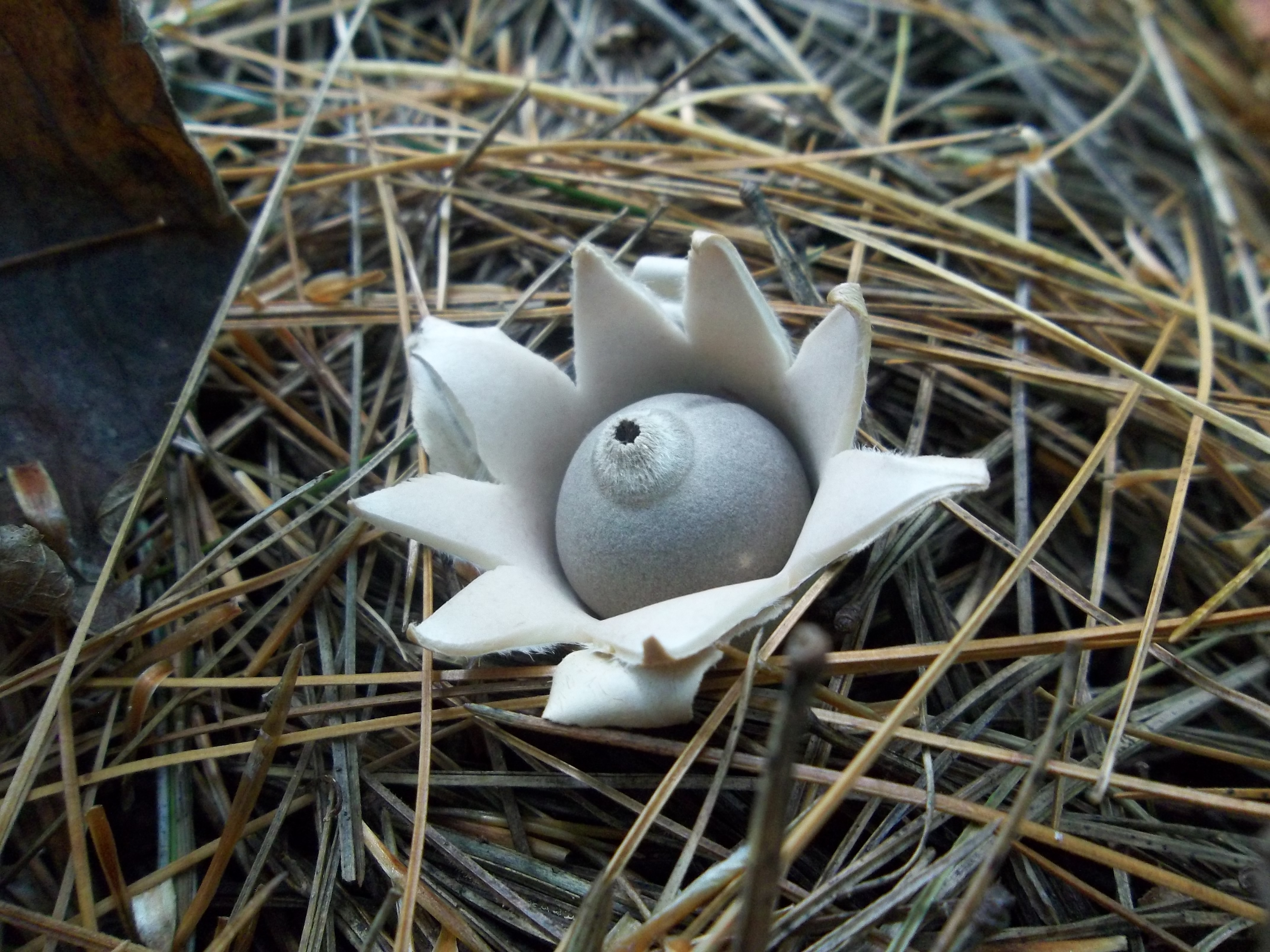

Scientific classification
- Domain: Eukaryota
- Kingdom: Fungi
- Division: Basidiomycota
- Class: Agaricomycetes
- Order: Geastrales
- Family: Geastraceae
- Genus: Geastrum
- Species: G. velutinum

Binomial name
- Geastrum velutinum Morgan (1895)

Synonyms
- Geastrum caespitosum (Lloyd) Lloyd (1920)

= Geastrum velutinum =

Species of fungus

Geastrum velutinum is a species of fungus in the family Geastraceae. Found in North America, it was first described scientifically by Andrew Price Morgan in 1895.
