= Geastrum aculeatum =

Scientific classification
- Kingdom: Fungi
- Division: Basidiomycota
- Class: Agaricomycetes
- Order: Geastrales
- Family: Geastraceae
- Genus: Geastrum
- Species: G. aculeatum

Binomial name
- Geastrum aculeatum da Silva, Cabral, Marinho, Ishikawa & Baseia, 2013

Species of fungus

Geastrum aculeatum is a species of mushroom belonging to the genus Geastrum, or earthstar fungi. It is found in eastern Brazil.
