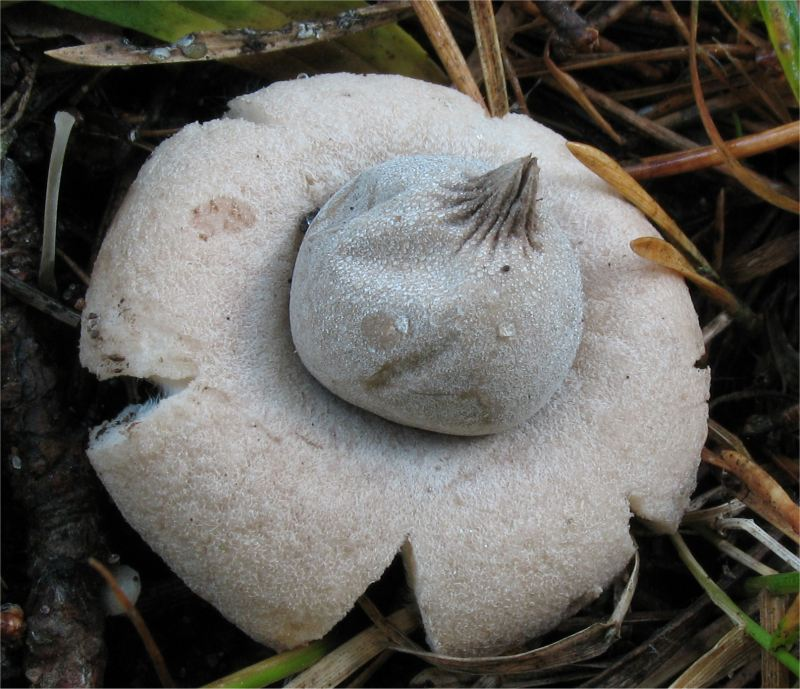

Scientific classification
- Domain: Eukaryota
- Kingdom: Fungi
- Division: Basidiomycota
- Class: Agaricomycetes
- Order: Geastrales
- Family: Geastraceae
- Genus: Geastrum
- Species: G. elegans

Binomial name
- Geastrum elegans Vittad. (1842)

Synonyms
- Geastrum badium Pers. (1809)

= Geastrum elegans =

Geastrum elegans Mycological characteristics
- Glebal hymenium
- No distinct cap
- Hymenium attachment is not applicable
- Lacks a stipe
- Spore print is brown
- Ecology is saprotrophic
- Edibility is inedible

Geastrum elegans is an inedible species of mushroom belonging to the genus Geastrum, or earthstar fungi.
