= Geastrum berkeleyi =

Scientific classification
- Kingdom: Fungi
- Division: Basidiomycota
- Class: Agaricomycetes
- Order: Geastrales
- Family: Geastraceae
- Genus: Geastrum
- Species: G. berkeleyi

Binomial name
- Geastrum berkeleyi Massee (1889)

Geastrum berkeleyi
- Mycological characteristics
- Glebal hymenium
- No distinct cap
- Spore print is brown
- Ecology is saprotrophic
- Edibility is inedible

Geastrum berkeleyi, or Berkeley's earthstar, is an inedible species of mushroom belonging to the genus Geastrum, or earthstar fungi. It can be distinguished from other Geastrum species by the flat bipyramidal shape of the calcium oxalate crystals found on its endoperidium.

Despite being a very uncommon mushroom, it has a wide geographical distribution, having been documented in Northern and Eastern Europe as well as Eastern Asia.

== Distribution ==
European countries it is found in include Austria, the Czech Republic, Denmark, Estonia, Finland, Great Britain, Hungary, the Netherlands, Poland, Slovakia, Spain, Sweden, and Turkey. In Asia, it can be found in China and Japan.

The species was thought extinct in Poland until it was discovered growing in a reserve near Chęciny.
