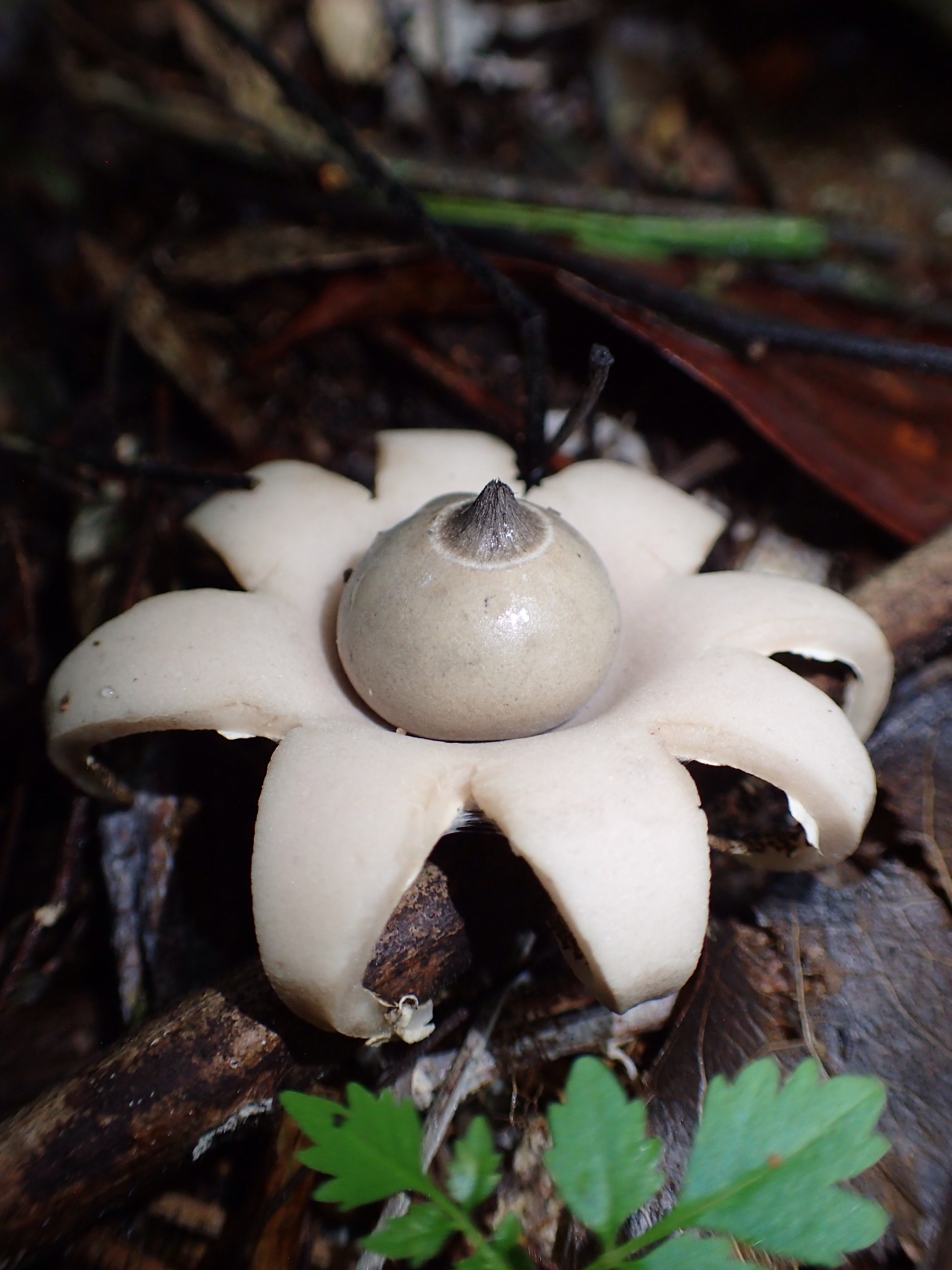

Scientific classification
- Domain: Eukaryota
- Kingdom: Fungi
- Division: Basidiomycota
- Class: Agaricomycetes
- Order: Geastrales
- Family: Geastraceae
- Genus: Geastrum
- Species: G. lageniforme

Binomial name
- Geastrum lageniforme Vittad. (1842)

Synonyms
- Geastrum lageniforme var. ahmadii V.J.Staněk (1958); Geastrum lageniforme var. koreanum V.J.Staněk (1958); Geastrum lageniforme var. umbrinum V.J.Staněk (1958)

= Geastrum lageniforme =

Species of fungus

Geastrum lageniforme is a species of fungus belonging to the genus Geastrum. It was described as new to science by Italian mycologist Carlo Vittadini. It is found in Africa, Europe, North America, and South America.
