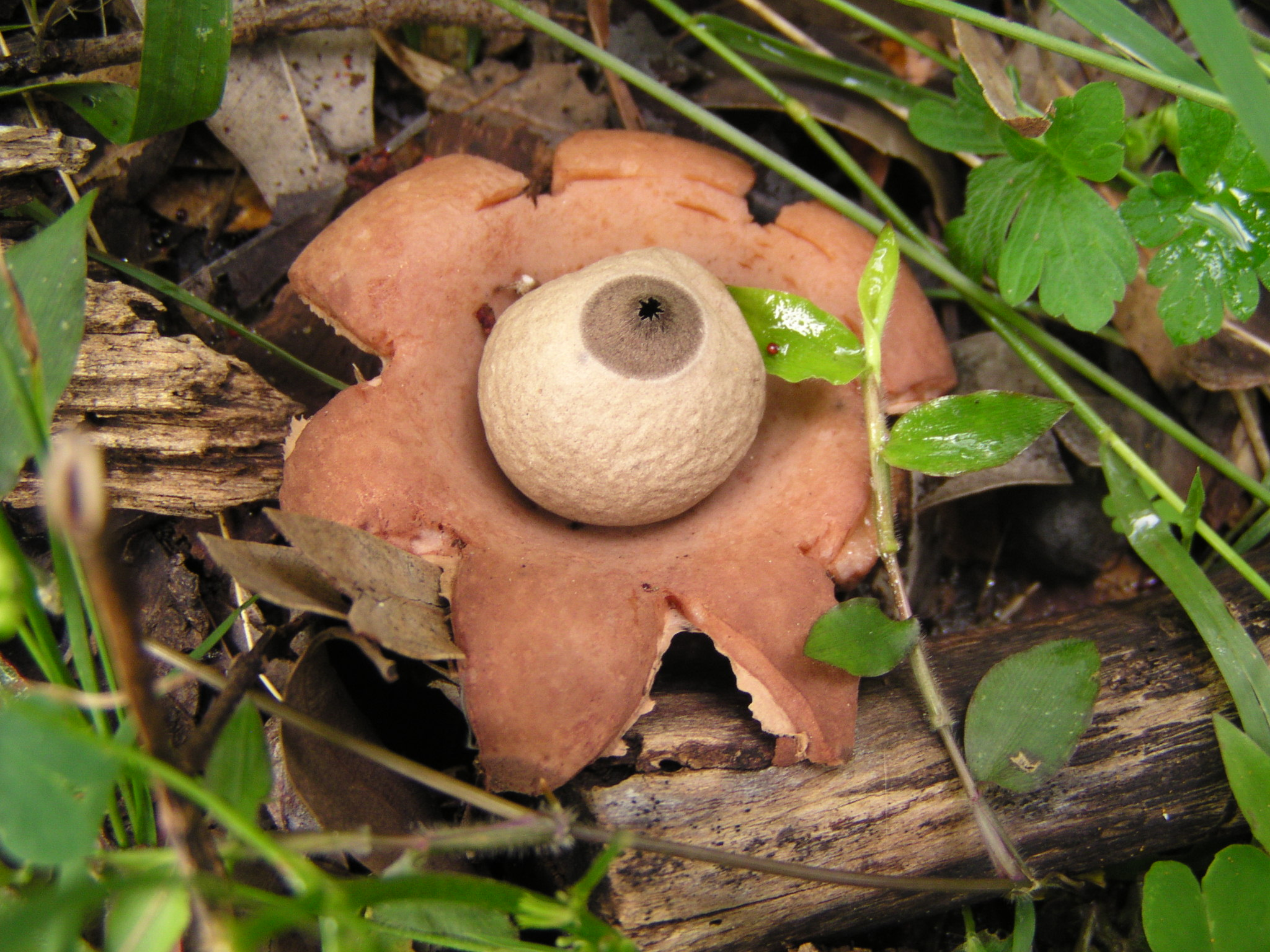

Scientific classification
- Kingdom: Fungi
- Division: Basidiomycota
- Class: Agaricomycetes
- Order: Geastrales
- Family: Geastraceae
- Genus: Geastrum
- Species: G. saccatum

Binomial name
- Geastrum saccatum Fr. (1829)

= Geastrum saccatum =

Species of mushroom

Geastrum saccatum
- Mycological characteristics
- Glebal hymenium
- No distinct cap
- Hymenium attachment is not applicable
- Lacks a stipe
- Spore print is brown
- Ecology is saprotrophic
- Edibility is inedible

Geastrum saccatum, commonly known as the sessile earthstar or rounded earthstar, or star of the land, is a species of mushroom belonging to the genus Geastrum. The opening of the outer layer of the fruiting body in the characteristic star shape is thought to be due to a buildup of calcium oxalate crystals immediately prior to dehiscence. G. saccatum is distinguished from other earthstars by the distinct circular ridge or depression surrounding the central pore.

The species has a worldwide distribution and is found growing on rotting wood. It is a common mushroom, but peaks in popularity during late summer. It is considered inedible but contains bioactive compounds.

== Description ==
The immature fruiting body is 0.6 to 2.5 centimetres (1/4 to 1 in) in diameter and 0.8 to 1.5 cm (3/8 to 5/8 in) tall. Initially, the fruiting body is egg-shaped—similar in appearance to puffballs—and has strands of mycelia (rhizomorphs) at the base that attach it to the growing surface. The 'skin,' or peridium, is composed of two separate layers: the outer layer (exoperidium), which is a golden tan to yellowish-brown color, separates away from the inner basidiocarp and splits into five to eight rays that curve backward (recurve) to the base.

The mushroom is 2 to 5 cm (3/4 to 2 in) in diameter after the rays have expanded. Unlike some other members of the genus Geastrum (like G. fornicatum), the arms do not push the basidiocarp off the ground; rather, it lies flat. The inner spore-bearing basidiocarp is 0.5 to 2 cm (1/4 to 3/4 in) broad, and has a central pore surrounded by a circular dull-brown apical disc; the disc is distinctly ridged or depressed. The inside of the interior sphere is white when young, but matures into a mass of brown, powdery spores mixed with thick-walled fibres known as capillitium. The flesh is bitter.

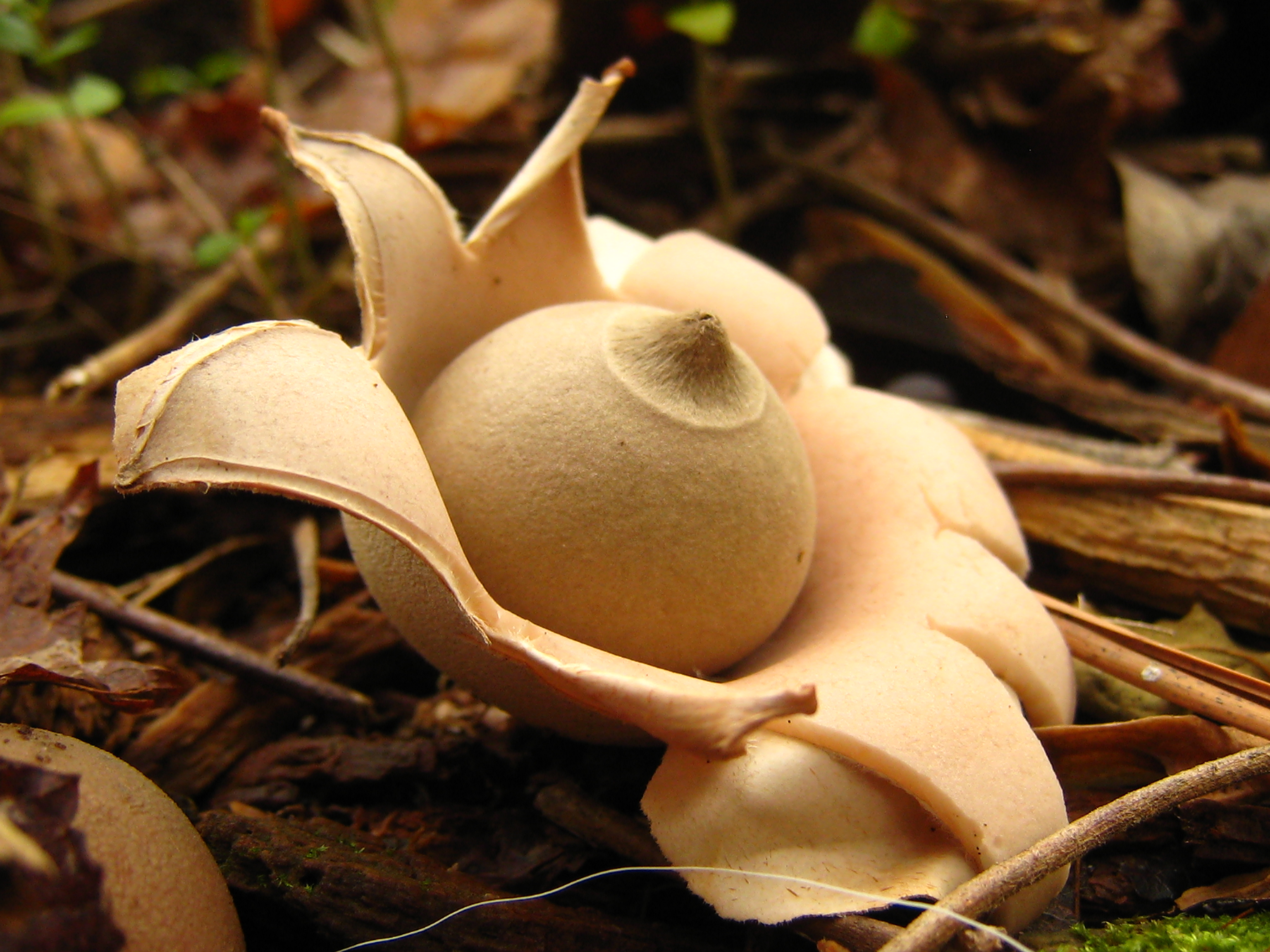
A fresh G. saccatum specimen

=== Spores ===
The spores are rounded, with warts, and have dimensions of 3.5–4.5 μm.

=== Mechanism of dehiscence ===
A study has shown that the formation of calcium oxalate crystals on the hyphae that form the endoperidial layer of the basidiocarp is responsible for the characteristic opening (dehiscence) of the outer peridial layers. Calcium oxalate is a common compound found in many fungi, including the earthstars. Curtis Gates Lloyd was the first to note the presence of these crystals on the endoperidium of G. calceus (now known as G. minimum). The formation of calcium oxalate crystals stretches the layers of the outer walls, pushing the inner and outer layers of the peridium apart.

=== Similar species ===
The related species G. fimbriatum does not have an apical disc, and its pores are slightly smaller. G. saccatum may be distinguished from G. indicum by the absence of loose tissue forming a collar around the base of the endoperidium. Other similar species include G. fornicatum and G. triplex. Astraeus earthstars usually have less orderly rays.

== Habitat and distribution ==
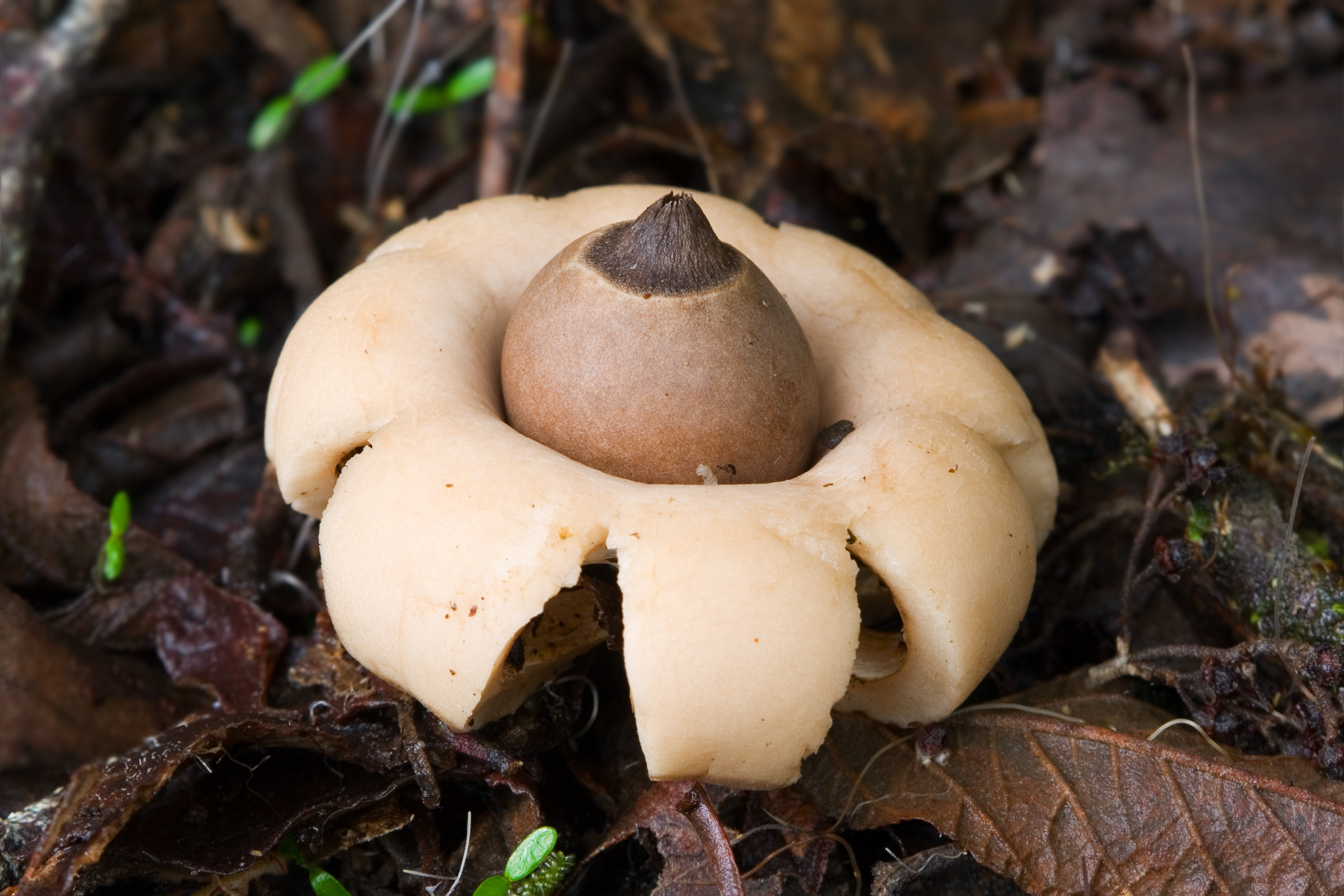
Specimen from Tasmania, Australia

Geastrum saccatum is saprobic, and grows scattered or clustered together in leaf litter of humus, usually in late summer and fall. It has a cosmopolitan distribution, and is well adapted to tropical regions. It is common in Hawaiian dry forests.

The species has been collected in North America (Canada, the United States and Mexico), Central America (the Congo and Panama), South America (Argentina, Uruguay, and Brazil), Cuba, Africa (Tanzania, West Africa, and South Africa), Asia (China and India), and Tobago and Toowoomba, QLD, Australia. In North America, it is found September–December on the west coast and July–October elsewhere.

== Potential uses ==
The species is inedible in its mature state, in which it is usually found.

=== Bioactive compounds ===
A β-glucan–protein complex extracted from G. saccatum was isolated and analysed and shown to have antiinflammatory, antioxidant, and cytotoxic activities. It is suggested that the mechanism for the antiinflammatory activity is due to inhibition of the enzymes nitric oxide synthase and cyclooxygenase.

== In culture ==
In Brazil, its common name translates to "star of the land".

== See also ==
- Medicinal uses of fungi
