= Geastrum entomophilum =

Scientific classification
- Domain: Eukaryota
- Kingdom: Fungi
- Division: Basidiomycota
- Class: Agaricomycetes
- Order: Geastrales
- Family: Geastraceae
- Genus: Geastrum
- Species: G. entomophilum

Binomial name
- Geastrum entomophilum Fazolino, Calonge & Baseia (2008)

Geastrum entomophilum Mycological characteristics
- Glebal hymenium
- No distinct cap
- Spore print is brown
- Ecology is saprotrophic
- Edibility is inedible

Geastrum entomophilum is an inedible species of mushroom belonging to the genus Geastrum, or earthstar fungi. Found in northeast Brazil in 2008, the species was found with beetles inhabiting the spore sac, likely contributing to spore dissemination.
