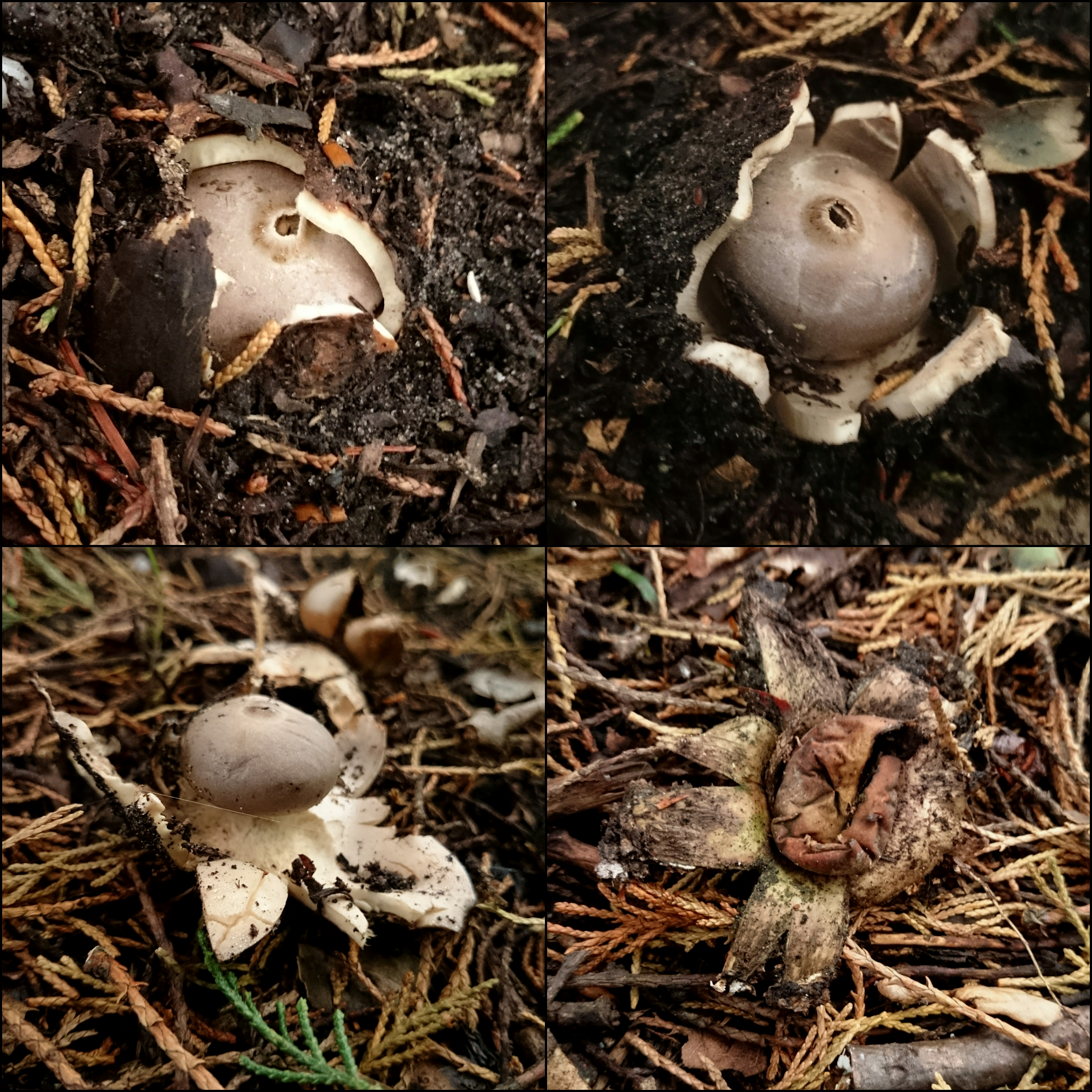
- Geastrum coronatum

Scientific classification
- Kingdom: Fungi
- Division: Basidiomycota
- Class: Agaricomycetes
- Order: Geastrales
- Family: Geastraceae
- Genus: Geastrum
- Species: G. coronatum

Binomial name
- Geastrum coronatum Pers. 1801

Synonyms
- G. limbatum Fr.

= Geastrum coronatum =

Geastrum coronatum Mycological characteristics
- Glebal hymenium
- No distinct cap
- Hymenium attachment is not applicable
- Lacks a stipe
- Spore print is brown
- Ecology is saprotrophic
- Edibility is inedible

Geastrum coronatum is an inedible species of mushroom belonging to the genus Geastrum, or earthstar fungi. Christian Hendrik Persoon published the first description of Geastrum coronatum in 1801.
