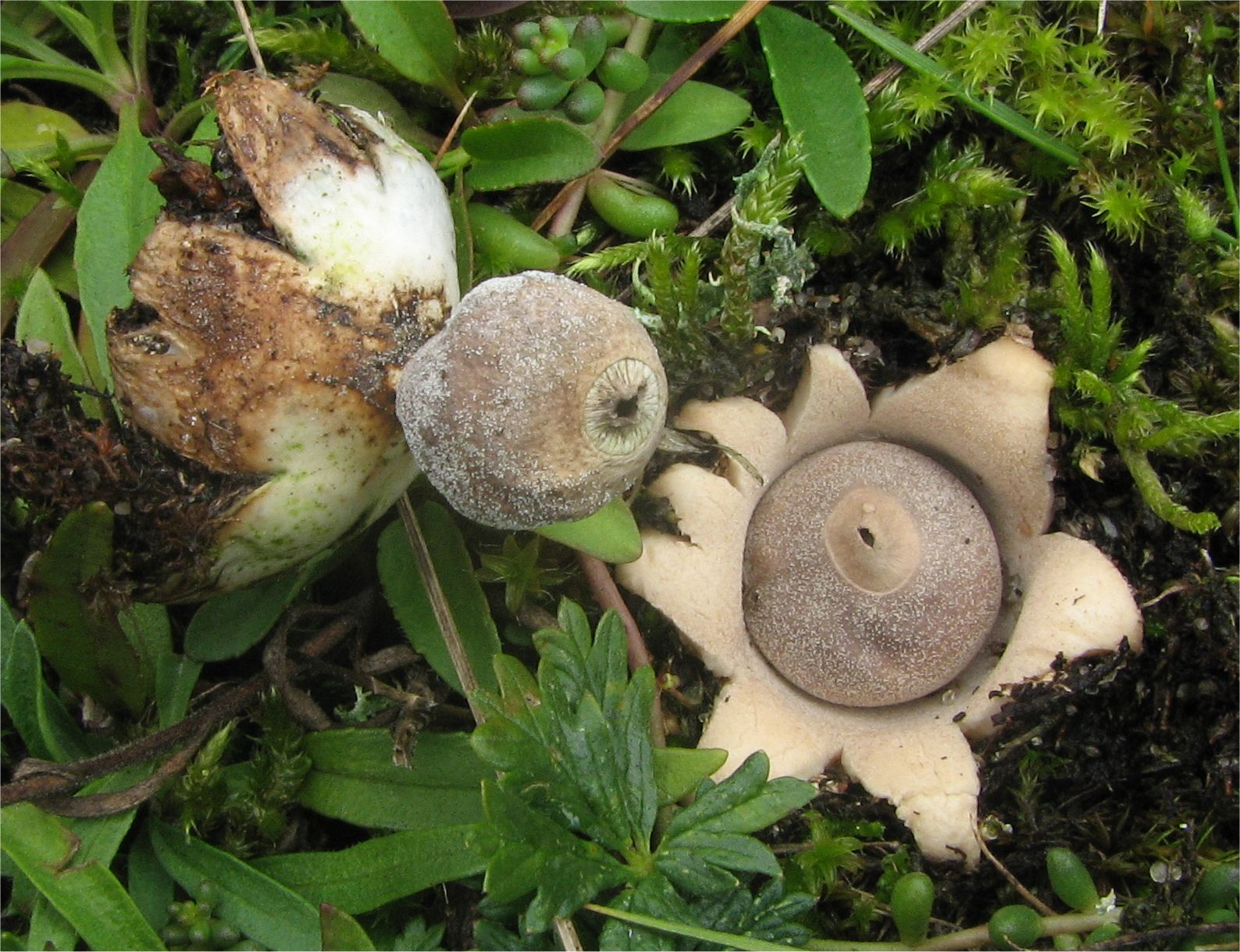

Scientific classification
- Domain: Eukaryota
- Kingdom: Fungi
- Division: Basidiomycota
- Class: Agaricomycetes
- Order: Geastrales
- Family: Geastraceae
- Genus: Geastrum
- Species: G. minimum

Binomial name
- Geastrum minimum Schwein. (1822)

Synonyms
- Geastrum cesatii Rabenh. (1851)

= Geastrum minimum =

Species of fungus

Geastrum minimum, the tiny earthstar, is an inedible species of mushroom belonging to the genus Geastrum. Although rare, it is widespread in Europe, where it occurs in a range of habitats. It is a priority species in the UK, where it has been found in the sand dunes at Holkham National Nature Reserve.

The species was first described by Lewis David de Schweinitz in 1822.

== Description ==
Fruit bodies are initially roughly spherical before the outer peridium splits to form a star with 6–11 "rays". When opened, the diameter of the fruit body is 1–3 centimetres (1/2–1 1/4 in). The inner spore sac is spherical or egg-shaped, and measures 0.5–1 cm (1/4–1/2 in). The more-or-less round spores measure 5–5.5–4–4.5 μm and have warts on their surface.
