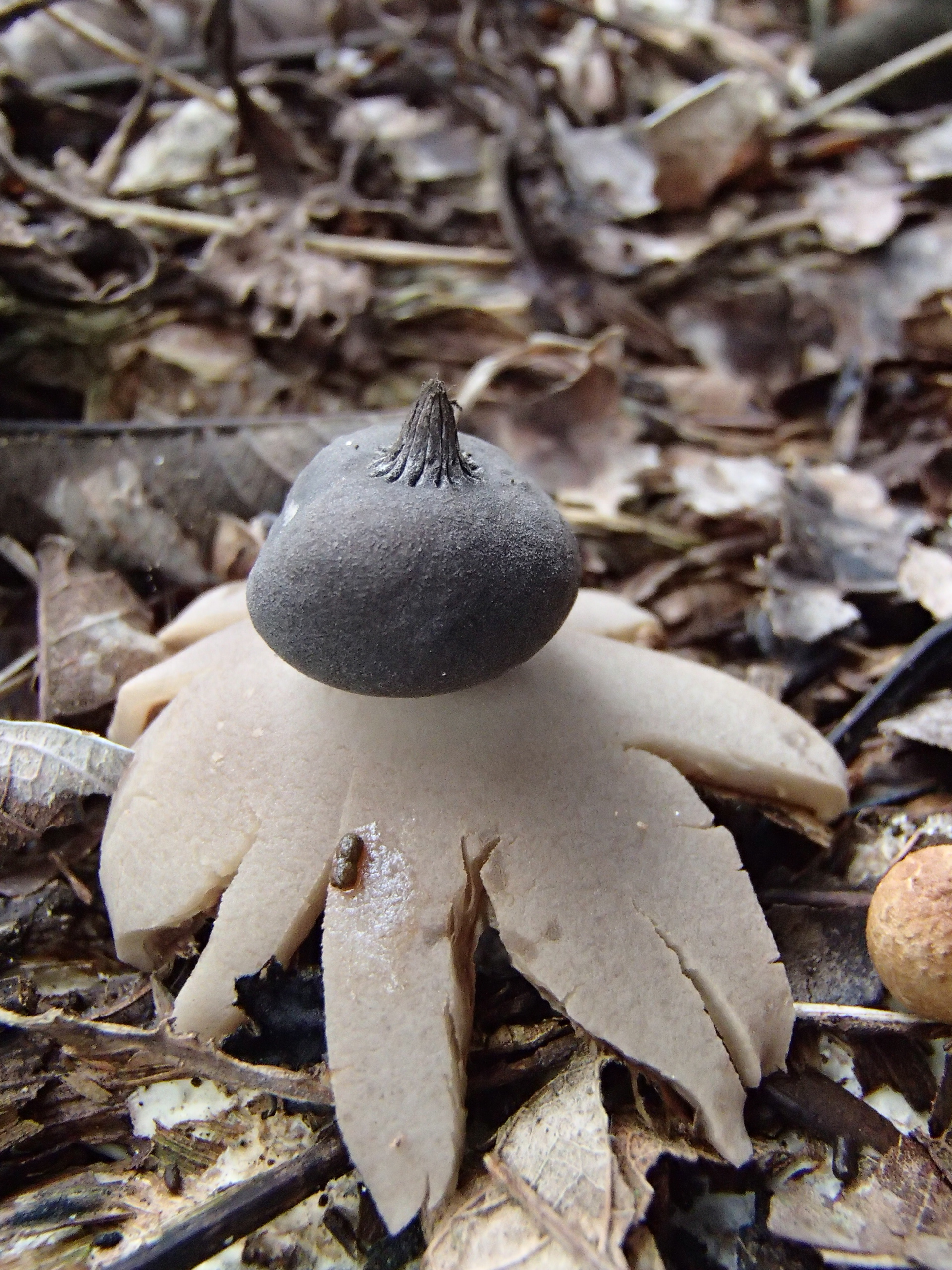

Scientific classification
- Domain: Eukaryota
- Kingdom: Fungi
- Division: Basidiomycota
- Class: Agaricomycetes
- Order: Geastrales
- Family: Geastraceae
- Genus: Geastrum
- Species: G. lloydianum

Binomial name
- Geastrum lloydianum Rick (1859)

Synonyms
- Geastrum saccatum var. lloydianum (Rick) Rick (1961)

= Geastrum lloydianum =

Species of fungus

Geastrum lloydianum is a species of fungus belonging to the genus Geastrum, or earthstar fungi. Described as new to science in 1906 by Johannes Rick, it is found in South America.
