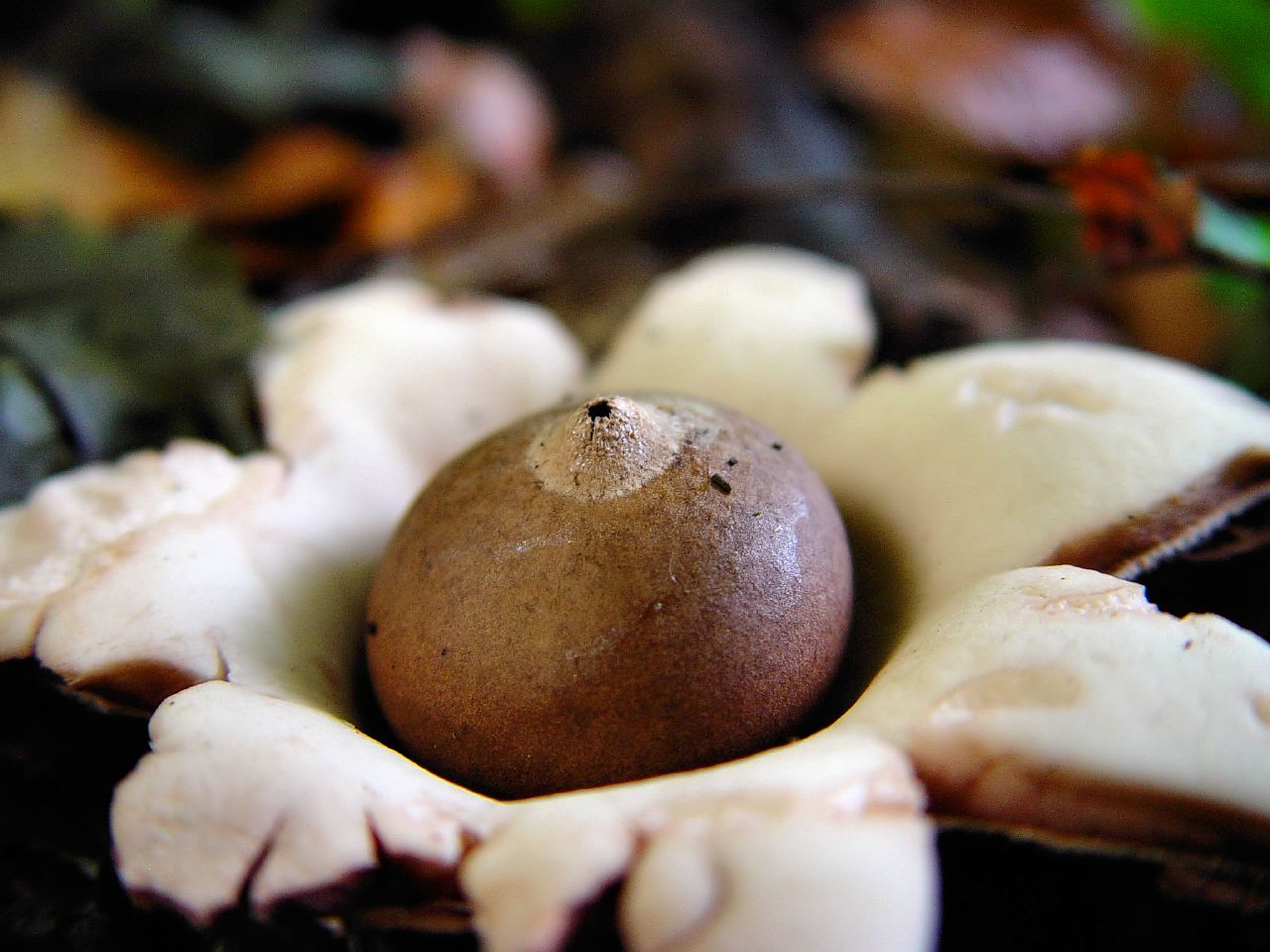
- Geastrum triplex
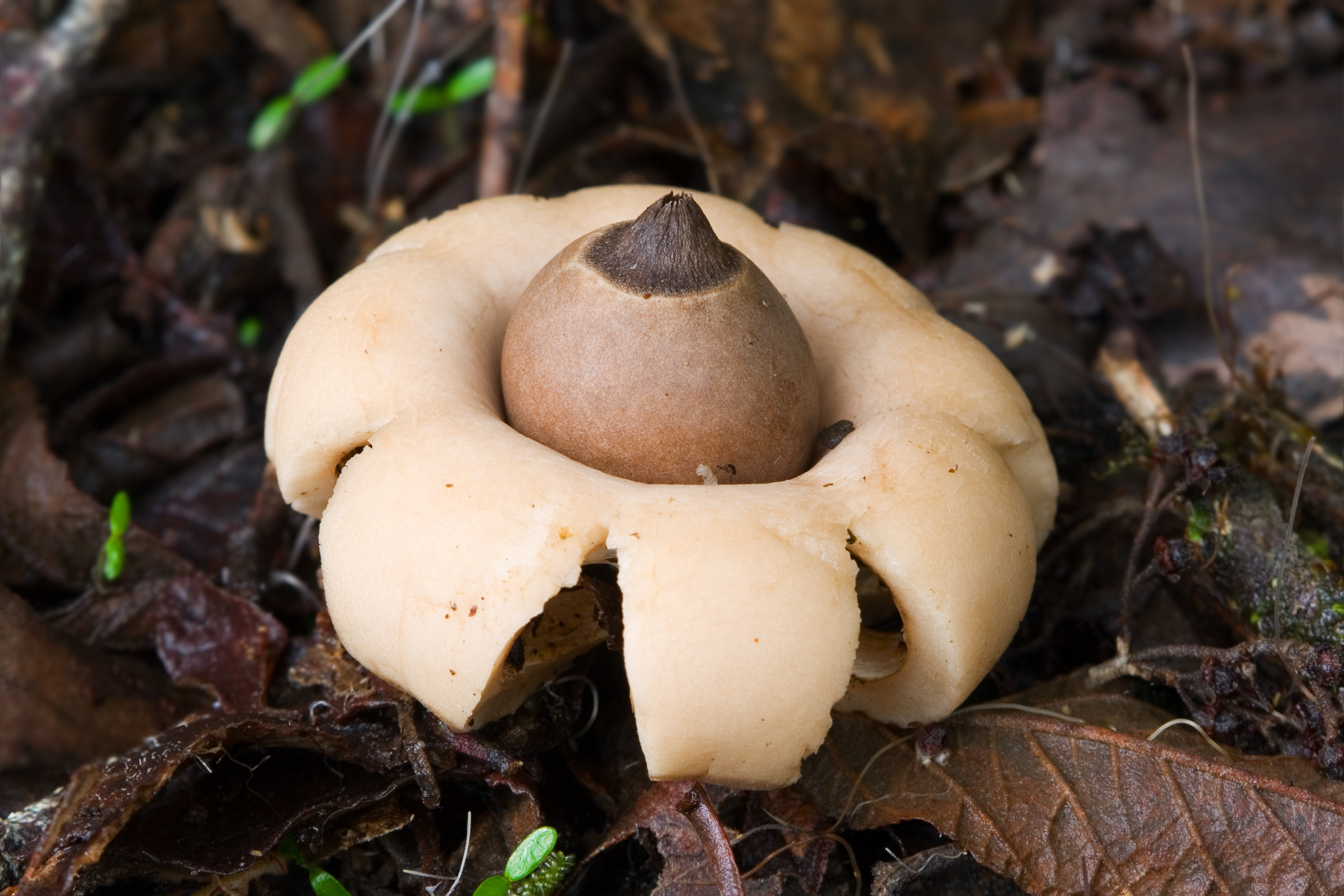
- Geastrum saccatum

Scientific classification
- Kingdom: Fungi
- Division: Basidiomycota
- Class: Agaricomycetes
- Order: Geastrales
- Family: Geastraceae
- Genus: Geastrum; Pers.

Type species
- Geastrum coronatum Pers.

Species
- About 50

= Geastrum =

Genus of fungi

Geastrum (orthographical variant Geaster) is a genus of puffball-like mushrooms in the family Geastraceae. Many species are commonly known as earthstars.

The name, which comes from geo meaning earth and aster meaning star, refers to the behavior of the outer peridium. At maturity, the outer layer of the fruiting body splits into segments which turn outward creating a star-like pattern on the ground. The inner peridium is called a spore sac. In some species, the outer peridium splits from a middle layer, causing the spore sac to arch off the ground. If the outer peridium opens when wet and closes when dry, it is described as hygroscopic.

In some species, the inner peridium is borne on a stalk or pedicel. The columella is a column-like clump of sterile tissue found inside the inner peridium. The network of fertile tissue inside the inner peridium, the capillitium, arises from the columella. This is where basidia and basidiospores are produced. The mouth in most species of "earth-stars" is quite prominent, often arising as a small cone at the apex of the inner peridium. It may be even or sulcate (grooved).

They are generally not toxic but considered non-edible due to their fibrous texture in the mature stage at which they are generally found.

== Species ==
Although the Dictionary of the Fungi (2008) estimated roughly 50 species in Geastrum, a more recent estimate (2014) suggests that there may be up to 120 species. Geastrum coronatum Pers. has been proposed as the conserved type for the genus. Some similar species that are otherwise difficult to differentiate using classical morphological features (such as G. triplex, G. saccatum, and G. lageniforme) can be identified using chemical spot tests that detect phenoloxidase enzymatic activity, a differences in the crystal structure of calcium oxalate deposits or DNA sequences. Species include:

- Geastrum aculeatum
- Geastrum albonigrum
- Geastrum andrewsii
- Geastrum argentatum
- Geastrum argentinum
- Geastrum australe
- Geastrum austrominimum
- Geastrum benitoi
- Geastrum britannicum
- Geastrum berkeleyi
- Geastrum bushnellii
- Geastrum campestre
- Geastrum clelandii
- Geastrum congolense
- Geastrum corollinum
- Geastrum coronatum
- Geastrum dissimile
- Geastrum drummondii
- Geastrum dubowskii
- Geastrum echinulatum
- Geastrum elegans
- Geastrum elliptice
- Geastrum entomophilum
- Geastrum episcopale
- Geastrum fimbriatum
- Geastrum flexuosum
- Geastrum floriforme
- Geastrum fornicatum
- Geastrum fuscogleba
- Geastrum hieronymi
- Geastrum hirsutum
- Geastrum huneckii
- Geastrum hungaricum
- Geastrum inpaense – Brazil
- Geastrum jurei
- Geastrum kotlabae
- Geastrum kuharii
- Geastrum lageniforme
- Geastrum leptospermum
- Geastrum lilloi
- Geastrum litchiforme
- Geastrum lloydianum
- Geastrum magnosporum
- Geastrum melanocephalum
- Geastrum meridionale
- Geastrum minimum
- Geastrum mirabile
- Geastrum morganii
- Geastrum ovalisporum
- Geastrum oxylobum
- Geastrum papinuttii
- Geastrum parvisporum
- Geastrum parvistriatum
- Geastrum pectinatum
- Geastrum pleosporus
- Geastrum pouzarii
- Geastrum pseudolimbatum
- Geastrum quadrifidum
- Geastrum reticulatum
- Geastrum rhizophorum
- Geastrum rufescens
- Geastrum rugulosum
- Geastrum rusticum – Brazil
- Geastrum saccatum
- Geastrum schmidelii
- Geastrum schweinitzii
- Geastrum senoretiae
- Geastrum setiferum
- Geastrum smardae
- Geastrum smithii
- Geastrum stiptatum
- Geastrum striatum
- Geastrum subiculosum
- Geastrum tichifer
- Geastrum triplex
- Geastrum velutinum
- Geastrum verrucoramulosum
- Geastrum welwitschii
- Geastrum xerophilum
- Geastrum xylogenum

== Sources ==
- New Zealand Species
- British Species
- Czech Species and Photos
- "Geastrum Pers". Atlas of Living Australia.
- "Geastraceae". Virtual Herbarium, Steere Herbarium. New York Botanical Garden.
- Ponce de Leon, Patricio, A Revision of the Family Geastraceae, Field Museum of Natural History 1968
- Bates, Scott T. (December 2004). Arizona members of the Geastraceae and Lycoperdaceae (Basidiomycota, Fungi) (Masters). Arizona State University.
- Sunhede, Stellan (1989). Geastraceae (Basidiomycotina): Morphology, Ecology and Systematics, with Special Emphasis on the North European Species. Fungiflora. ISBN 978-82-90724-05-9.
