= Peridium =

Protective layer enclosing a mass of spores in fungi

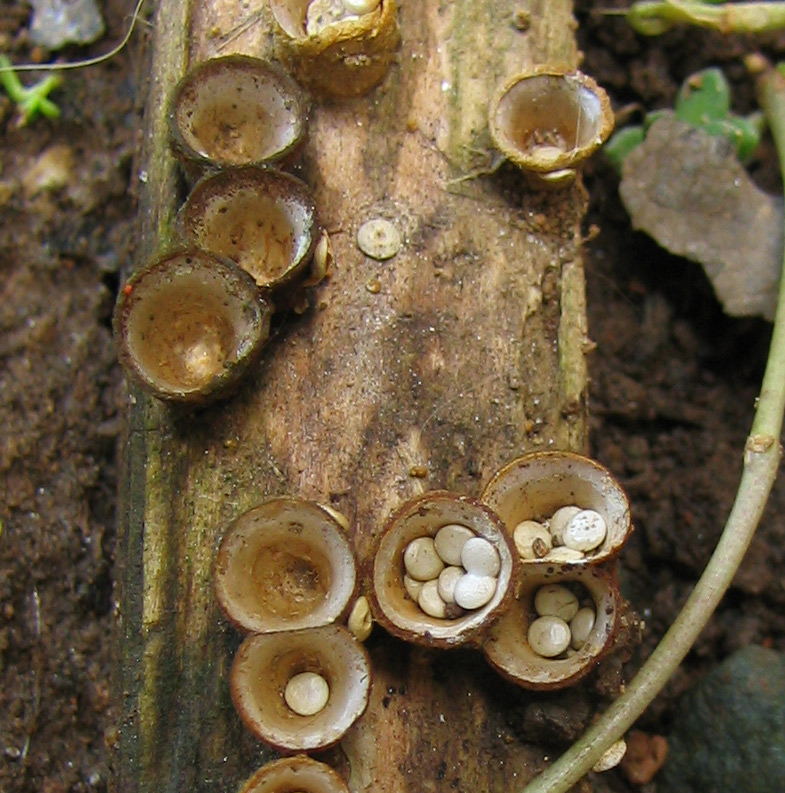
The outer layer of this bird's nest fungus (Crucibulum laeve) is the peridium.

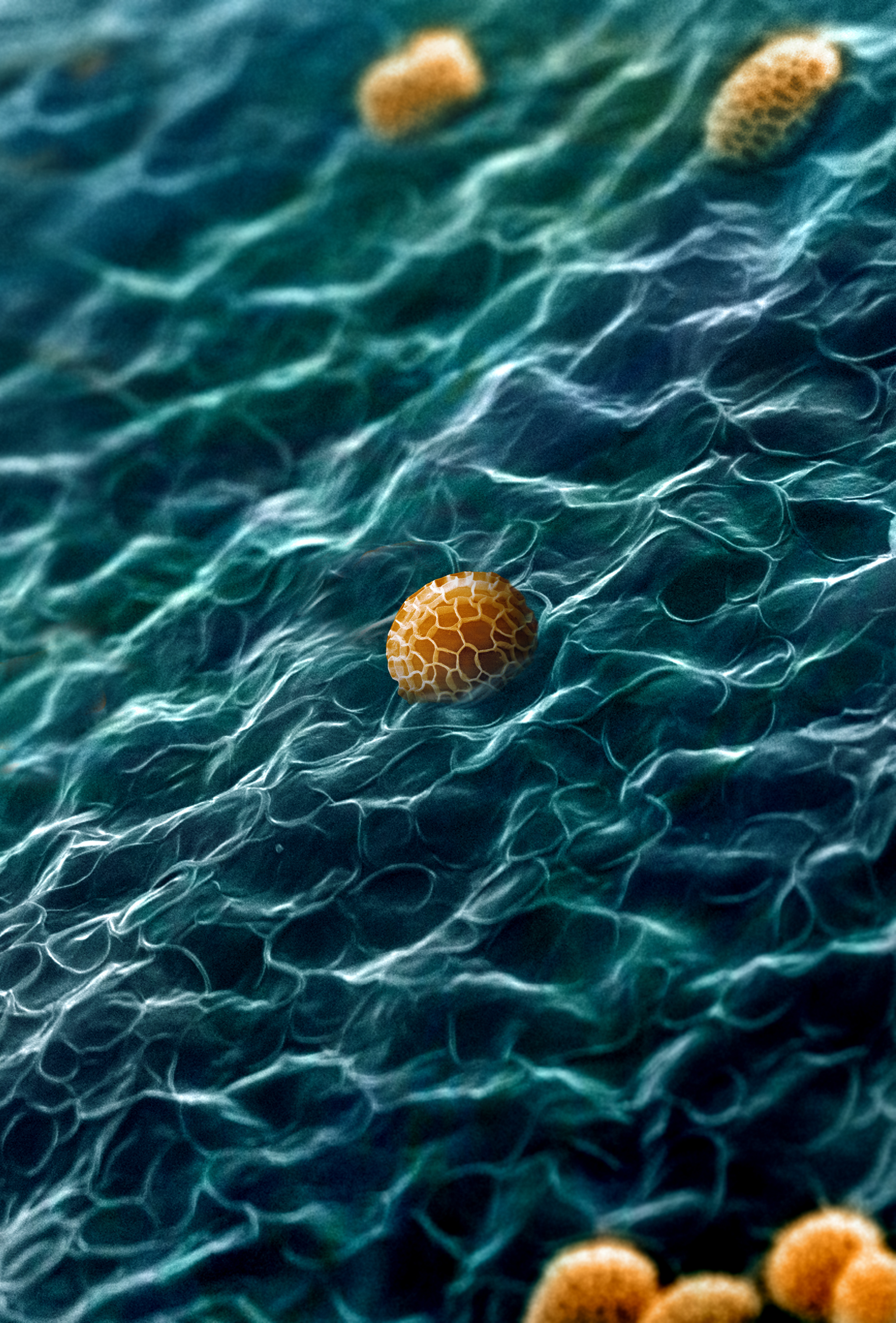
Internal surface of the peridium of the rare myxomycete Tubifera dudkae is covered with folds

The peridium is the protective layer that encloses a mass of spores in fungi. This outer covering is a distinctive feature of gasteroid fungi.

== Description ==
Depending on the species, the peridium may vary from being paper-thin to thick and rubbery or even hard. Typically, peridia consist of one to three layers. If there is only a single layer, it is called a peridium. If two layers are present, the outer layer is called the exoperidium and the inner layer the endoperidium. If three layers are present, they are the exoperidium, the mesoperidium and the endoperidium.

In the simplest subterranean forms, the peridium remains closed until the spores are mature, and even then shows no special arrangement for dehiscence or opening, but has to decay before the spores are liberated.

=== Puffballs ===
For most fungi, the peridium is ornamented with scales or spines. In species that become raised above ground during their development, generally known as the "puffballs", the peridium is usually differentiated into two or more layers, where the outer layer is usually resolved into warts or spines. In contrast, the inner layer remains continuous and smooth to preserve the spores. Sometimes, as in the case of Geaster, the number of layers is greater, and the exoperidium eventually splits from the apexes into a variable number of pointed portions. However, the inner layer remains intact by a definite aperture at the apex.

=== Earthballs ===
In contrast, earthball fungi generally have only one peridium, which is 3–9 cm across. This lone peridium is generally rigid and rindlike; it is white when sectioned but pink if fresh. The surface varies from yellow brown to dingy yellow, and is arranged into scales.

== Usage ==
The peridium is often given a specific name in particular species of fungi. For example, the peridium of mushrooms of the genus Amanita is called a volva. The peridium can also refer to the outer "nest" of a bird's-nest fungus.
