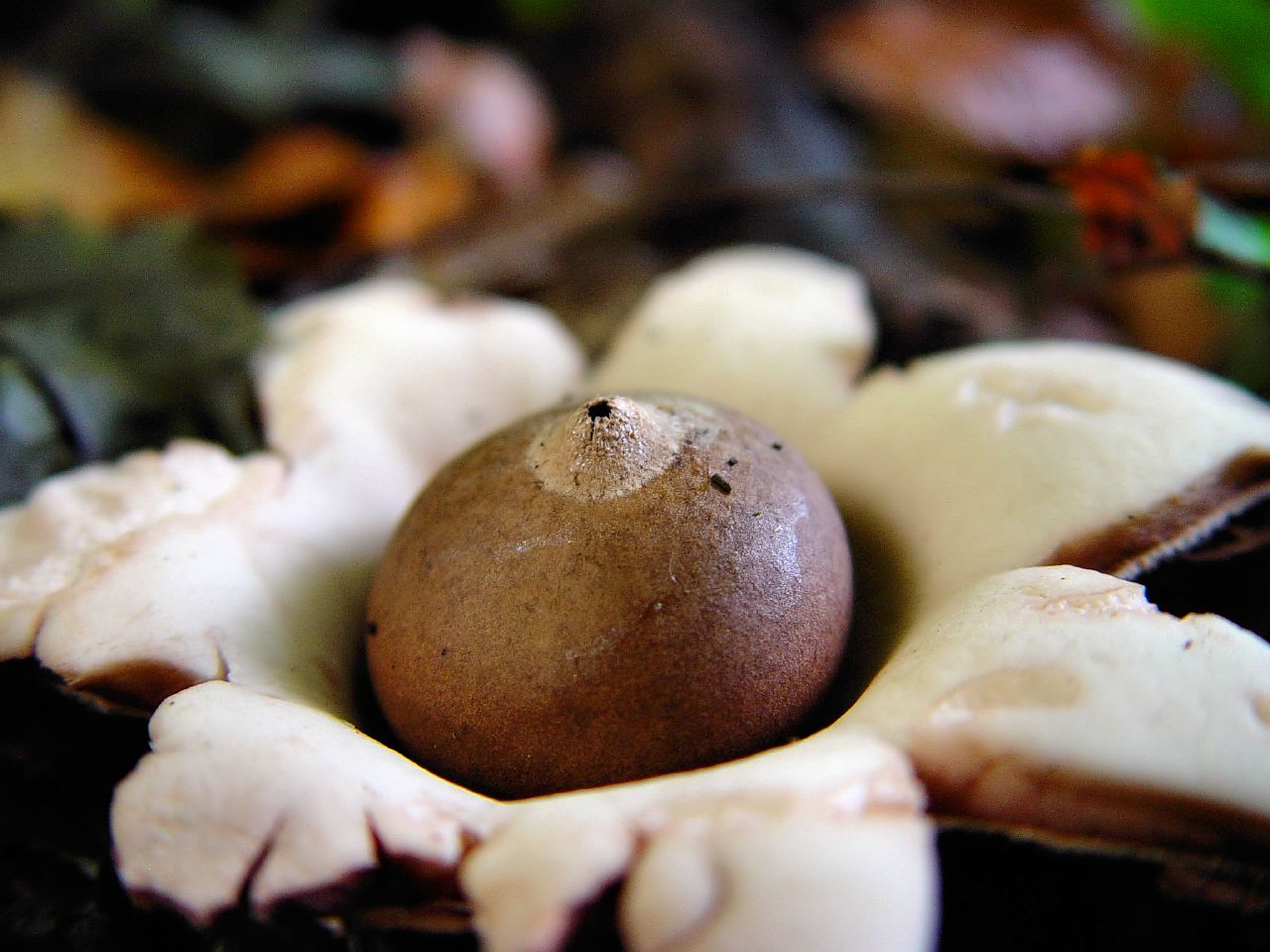
- Geastrum triplex

Scientific classification
- Kingdom: Fungi
- Division: Basidiomycota
- Class: Agaricomycetes
- Subclass: Phallomycetidae
- Order: Geastrales; K.Hosaka & Castellano (2007)
- Family: Geastraceae; Corda (1842)

Type genus
- Geastrum Pers. (1801)

Genera
- Boninogaster; Geasteroides; Geastrum; Myriostoma; Schenella; Sclerogaster; Sphaerobolus; Terrostella

= Geastrales =

Order of fungi

The Geastrales are an order of gasterocarpic basidiomycetes (fungi) that are related to the Gomphales. The order contains the families Geastraceae—which include the "earthstars" formerly placed in Lycoperdales or Phallales,—and also Schenellaceae, Sclerogastraceae and Sphaerobolaceae.

About 160 species are classified in this order, divided among seven or eight genera, including Geastrum, Myriostoma and Sphaerobolus. Sphaerobolus species are known as "shotgun fungus" or "cannonball fungus". They colonize wood-based mulches and may throw black, sticky, spore-containing globs onto nearby surfaces.

In Geastrum, once mature, the exoperidium splits into a variable number of rays, which give them their visible star shape. The exoperidial rays are there to protect the endoperidial body and orchestrate spore dispersal. The fruiting bodies of several earthstars are hygrometric: in dry weather the rays will dry and curl up around the soft spore sac, protecting it. In this state, often the whole fungus becomes detached from the ground and may roll around like a tumbleweed. In wetter weather, the rays moisten and uncurl; some even curl backward lifting the spore sac up. This allows rain or animals to hit the spore sac, emitting spores when enough moisture is present for them to germinate and establish.
