= List of fungi of South Africa – G =

This is an alphabetical list of fungal taxa as recorded from South Africa. Currently accepted names have been appended.

== Ga ==
Genus: Galera (Fr.) P. Kumm. 1871, a synonym of Galerina.

- Galera eatoni (Berk.) Sacc
- Galera hypnorum (Batsch) Quél. 1872
- Galera lateritia Quel. (sic) possibly (Fr.) P. Kumm. 1871
- Galera peroxydata (Berk.) Sacc. 1887, accepted as Conocybe peroxydata (Berk.) D.A. Reid, (1975)
- Galera pygmaeo-affinis (Fr.) Quél. 1872, accepted as Conocybe pygmaeoaffinis (Fr.) Kühner, (1935)
- Galera spartea Quel. (sic) possibly (Fr.) P. Kumm. 1871, accepted as Conocybe spartea (Fr.) Konrad & Maubl., (1949) [1948]
- Galera sphagnorum Karst. (sic) possibly (Pers.) Sacc. 1887, accepted as Galerina sphagnorum (Pers.) Kühner, (1935)
- Galera tenera Quel. (sic) possibly (Schaeff.) P. Kumm. 187,1 accepted as Conocybe tenera (Schaeff.) Kühner, (1935)
- Galera tenera var. siliginea Quel. (sic) possibly (Fr.) P. Kumm. 1871, accepted as Conocybe siliginea (Fr.) Kühner, (1935)

Genus: Ganoderma P. Karst. 1881

- Ganoderma africanum (Lloyd) Doidge 1950
- Ganoderma alluaudi Pat. & Har. 1906
- Ganoderma applanatum (Pers.) Pat. 1887
- Ganoderma applanatum var. laccatum (Sacc.) Rea 1922 accepted as Ganoderma pfeifferi Bres., (1889)
- Ganoderma australe (Fr.) Pat. 1889
- Ganoderma chilense (Fr.) Pat. 1889
- Ganoderma colossus Bres.(sic) [as colossum] possibly (Fr.) C.F. Baker 1920
- Ganoderma curtisii (Berk.) Murrill 1908
- Ganoderma emini Henn. 1893 accepted as Humphreya eminii (Henn.) Ryvarden, (1980)
- Ganoderma fulvellum Bres. 1889 accepted as Fomes fulvellus (Bres.) Sacc., (1891)
- Ganoderma lobatum Atk. (sic) possibly Bres. 1889, accepted as Fomes fulvellus (Bres.) Sacc., (1891)
- Ganoderma lucidum (Curtis) P. Karst. 1881
- Ganoderma mastoporum (Lév.) Pat. 1889 accepted as Ganoderma orbiforme (Fr.) Ryvarden [as orbiformum], (2000)
- Ganoderma mollicarnosum (Lloyd) Sacc. & Trotter 1925 accepted as Navisporus floccosus (Bres.) Ryvarden [as floccosa], (1980)
- Ganoderma obockense Pat. (1887) [as obockense]
- Ganoderma oerstedii Bres. (sic) possibly (Fr.) Torrend 1902
- Ganoderma oroflavum (Lloyd) C.J. Humphrey 1931 accepted as Ganoderma australe (Fr.) Pat., (1889)
- Ganoderma resinaceum Boud. 1889
- Ganoderma rugosum Bres. (sic) possibly (Blume & T. Nees) Pat. 1889, or Ganoderma rugosum var. nigrozonatum Bres. 1915, both accepted as Sanguinoderma rugosum (Blume & T. Nees) Y.F. Sun, D.H. Costa & B.K. Cui, (2020)

Genus: Gassicurtia Fée 1825

- Gassicurtia silacea Fée 1834 [as Gassicourtia silicea] accepted as Coniothecium silaceum (Fée) Keissl., (1930)

Family: Gasteromyceteae*

== Ge ==
Genus: Geaster P. Micheli 1729 accepted as Geastrum Pers., (1794)

- Geaster affinis Colenso. accepted as Geastrum affine Colenso (1884) [1883]
- Geaster calceus Lloyd. accepted as Geastrum calceum Lloyd (1907)
- Geaster capensis Thuem. accepted as Geastrum capense Thüm. (1877)
- Geaster coliformis Dicks. accepted as Geastrum coliforme (Dicks.) Pers. (1801)
- Geaster coriaceus Colenso. accepted as Geastrum coriaceum Colenso (1890) [1889]
- Geaster coronatus Schroet. accepted as Geastrum coronatum Schaeff. ex J. Schröt. (1889)
- Geaster drummondii Berk. accepted as Geastrum drummondii Berk. 1845
- Geaster fenestratum Fisch. (sic) probably accepted as Geastrum fenestratum (Batsch) Lloyd 1901
- Geaster granulosus Fuck. accepted as Geastrum granulosum Fuckel 1860
- Geaster macowani Kalchbr. accepted as Geastrum macowanii Kalchbr. 1882
- Geaster minimus Fisch.*
- Geaster plicatus Berk.*
- Geaster schmidelii Vit. accepted as Geastrum schmidelii Vittad. 1842
- Geaster schweinfurthii P.Henn. accepted as Geastrum schweinfurthii Henn. 1891
- Geaster striatulus Kalchbr. accepted as Geastrum striatulum Kalchbr. 1880

Genus: Geasteropsis Hollós 1903 accepted as Geastrum Pers., (1794)

- Geasteropsis conrathii Hollós 1903 [as conrathi] accepted as Geastrum conrathii (Hollós) P. Ponce de León, (1968)

Family: Geastreae

Genus: Geastrum Pers. 1794

- Geastrum ambiguum Mont. 1837
- Geastrum arenarium Lloyd 1907
- Geastrum bryantii Berk. 1860 accepted as Geastrum striatum DC. [as Geaster], (1805)
- Geastrum campestre Morgan 1887
- Geastrum conrathii (Hollós) P. Ponce de León, (1968) recorded as Geasteropsis conrathii Hollós 1903 [as conrathi]
- Geastrum corollinum (Batsch) Hollós, (1904) reported as Geastrum mammosum Chevall. 1826
- Geastrum dissimile Bottomley 1948.
- Geastrum fimbriatum Fr. 1829
- Geastrum floriforme Vittad. 1842
- Geastrum fornicatum Fr. (sic) possibly (Huds.) Hook. 1821
- Geastrum hieronymi Henn. 1897
- Geastrum hygrometricum Pers. 1801 accepted as Astraeus hygrometricus (Pers.) Morgan, (1889)
- Geastrum limbatum Fr. 1829
- Geastrum limbatum var. ellipsostoma N.J.G.*
- Geastrum macowani Kalchbr. 1882.
- Geastrum mammosum Chevall. 1826 accepted as Geastrum corollinum (Batsch) Hollós, (1904)
- Geastrum minimum Schwein. 1822
- Geastrum mirabile Mont. 1855
- Geastrum nanum Pers. 1809 accepted as Geastrum striatum DC. [as Geaster], (1805)
- Geastrum pazschkeanum Henn. 1900
- Geastrum pectinatum Pers. 1801
- Geastrum quadrifidum Pers. 1794
- Geastrum saccatum Fr. 1829
- Geastrum triplex Jungh. 1840
- Geastrum velutinum Morgan 1895

Family: Geoglossaceae Corda 1838

Genus: Geopyxis (Pers.) Sacc. 1889

- Geopyxis aluticolor (Berk.) Sacc. 1889
- Geopyxis ammophila Dur. & Mont. (sic) possibly Sacc. 1889, accepted as Peziza ammophila Durieu & Lév., (1848)
- Geopyxis cupularis (L.) Sacc. 1889 accepted as Tarzetta cupularis (L.) Lambotte, (1887)

Genus: Geotrichum Link 1809

- Geotrichum rugosum (Castell.) C.W. Dodge 1935
- Geotrichum sp.

== Gi ==
Genus: Gibellula Cavara 1894

- Gibellula aranearum P. Syd. 1922
- Gibellula haygarthii Van der Byl 1922

Genus: Gibbera Fr. 1825

- Gibbera engleriana (Henn.) Van der Byl 1928
- Gibbera tinctoria Massee 1911

Genus: Gibberella Sacc. 1877 accepted as Fusarium Link, (1809)

- Gibberella acuminata Wollenw. 1943 accepted as Fusarium acuminatum Ellis & Everh., (1895)
- Gibberella baccata (Wallr.) Sacc. 1878, accepted as Fusarium lateritium Nees, (1816)
- Gibberella fujikuroi Wollenw. (sic) possibly (Sawada) S. Ito 1919 accepted as Fusarium fujikuroi Nirenberg, (1976)
- Gibberella fujikuroi var. subglutinans E.T. Edwards 1933 accepted as Fusarium fujikuroi Nirenberg, (1976)
- Gibberella intricans Wollenw. 1930 accepted as Fusarium gibbosum Appel & Wollenw., (1910)
- Gibberella pulicaris (Kunze) Sacc. 1877 accepted as Fusarium roseum Link, (1809)
- Gibberella saubinetii (Mont.) Sacc. 1879 accepted as Fusarium graminearum Schwabe, (1839)

== Gl ==
Genus: Gliocladium Corda 1840, accepted as Sphaerostilbella (Henn.) Sacc. & D. Sacc., (1905)

- Gliocladium deliquescens Sopp 1912 accepted as Trichoderma deliquescens (Sopp) Jaklitsch, (2011)
- Gliocladium penicillioides Corda 1840 [as penicilloides] accepted as Sphaerostilbella penicillioides (Corda) Rossman, L. Lombard & Crous, (2015)
- Gliocladium roseum Bainier 1907 accepted as Clonostachys rosea (Link) Schroers, Samuels, Seifert & W. Gams, (1999)

Genus: Gloeodes Colby 1920

- Gloeodes pomigena (Schwein.) Colby 1920

Genus: Gloeoporus Mont. 1842

- Gloeoporus conchoides Mont. 1842 accepted as Gloeoporus thelephoroides (Hook.) G. Cunn., (1965)
- Gloeoporus dichrous (Fr.) Bres. 1912 accepted as Vitreoporus dichrous (Fr.) Zmitr., (2018)
- Gloeoporus thelephoroides (Hook.) G. Cunn., (1965) reported as Gloeoporus conchoides Mont. 1842

Genus: Gloeosoma Bres. 1920, accepted as Aleurodiscus Rabenh. ex J. Schröt., (1888)

- Gloeosoma capensis (Lloyd) Lloyd 1920, accepted as Aleurocystis capensis (Lloyd) Lloyd, (1920)

Genus: Gloeosporium Desm. & Mont. 1849, accepted as Diplocarpon F.A. Wolf, (1912)

- Gloeosporium affineSacc. 1878
- Gloeosporium ampelophagum de Bary (sic) possibly (Pass.) Sacc. 1878, accepted as Elsinoe ampelina Shear, (1929)
- Gloeosporium amygdalinum Brizi (sic) possibly (Pass.) Sacc. 1878, accepted as Elsinoe ampelina Shear, (1929)
- Gloeosporium cocophilum Wakef. 1913 accepted as Colletotrichum gloeosporioides (Penz.) Penz. & Sacc., (1884)
- Gloeosporium crocatum Sacc. 1891
- Gloeosporium epicarpi Thüm. 1877
- Gloeosporium fructigenum Berk. 1856 accepted as Colletotrichum gloeosporioides (Penz.) Penz. & Sacc., (1884)
- Gloeosporium cydoniae Mont. 1851
- Gloeosporium helichrysi G. Winter 1885 accepted as Colletotrichum helichrysi (G. Winter) Arx, (1957)
- Gloeosporium lagenaria (Pass.) Sacc. & Roum. [as lagenarium], (1880) accepted as Gloeosporium orbiculare (Berk.) Berk., (1876)
- Gloeosporium limetticola R.E. Clausen 1912, [as 'limetticolum'] accepted as Colletotrichum limetticola (R.E. Clausen) Damm, P.F. Cannon & Crous [as 'limetticolum'], (2012)
- Gloeosporium mangiferae Henn. 1898 accepted as Colletotrichum coccodes (Wallr.) S. Hughes, (1958)
- Gloeosporium musarum Cooke & Massee 1887
- Gloeosporium myricae Dippen. 1931
- Gloeosporium olivarum J.V. Almeida 1899 accepted as Colletotrichum coccodes (Wallr.) S. Hughes, (1958)
- Gloeosporium papayae Henn. 1895
- Gloeosporium passiflorae Speg. 1898 accepted as Colletotrichum coccodes (Wallr.) S. Hughes, (1958)
- Gloeosporium psidii Delacr. 1903 accepted as Colletotrichum coccodes (Wallr.) S. Hughes, (1958)
- Gloeosporium ptychospermatis Henn. 1902 accepted as Phlyctema ptychospermatis (Henn.) Arx, (1957)
- Gloeosporium sansevieriae Verwoerd & du Plessis 1931
- Gloeosporium sclerocaryae Pole Evans*
- Gloeosporium venetum Speg. 1879
- Gloeosporium violae Berk. & Br. (sic) possibly Pass. 1849, accepted as Marssonina violae (Pass.) Magnus, (1906)
- Gloeosporium sp.

Genus: Glomerella Spauld. & H. Schrenk 1903, accepted as Colletotrichum Corda, (1831)

- Glomerella cingulata (G.F. Atk.) Spauld. & H. Schrenk 1903 accepted as Colletotrichum gloeosporioides (Penz.) Penz. & Sacc., (1884)
- Glomerella glycines Lehman & F.A. Wolf 1926 accepted as Colletotrichum glycines Hori ex Hemmi, (1920)
- Glomerella gossypii Edgerton 1909 accepted as Colletotrichum gossypii Southw., (1891)
- Glomerella lindemuthiana Shear [as lindemuthianum], Bull. (1913) accepted as Colletotrichum lindemuthianum (Sacc. & Magnus) Briosi & Cavara 1889
- Glomerella phacidiomorpha (Ces.) Petr. 1927
- Glomerella psidii J. Sheld. 1905
- Glomerella rufomaculans (Berk.) Spauld. & H. Schrenk 1903 accepted as Colletotrichum gloeosporioides (Penz.) Penz. & Sacc., (1884)

Genus: Gloniella Sacc. 1883

- Gloniella multiseptata Doidge 1920 accepted as Gloniella natalensis Doidge, (1941)
- Gloniella natalensis Doidge, 1941

Genus: Glyphis Ach. 1814 (Lichens)

- Glyphis cicatricosa Ach. 1814
- Glyphis cicatricosa var. confluens (Zenker) Zahlbr. 1927 accepted as Glyphis cicatricosa Ach. 1814
- Glyphis cicatricosa var. simplicior (Vain.) Zahlbr. 1927
- Glyphis confluens Zenker 1827 accepted as Glyphis cicatricosa Ach. 1814

== Gn ==
Genus: Gnomonia Ces. & De Not. 1863

- Gnomonia leptostyla (Fr.) Ces. & De Not. 1863

Family: Gnomoniaceae G. Winter 1886

== Go ==
Genus: Gomphinaria Preuss 1851, accepted as Ramularia Unger, (1833)

- Gomphinaria pedrosoi (Brumpt) C.W. Dodge 1935 accepted as Fonsecaea pedrosoi (Brumpt) Negroni, (1936)

Genus: Gorgoniceps (P. Karst.) P. Karst. 1871

- Gorgoniceps kuitoensis Henn. 1903

== Gr ==
Genus: Grammothele Berk. & M.A. Curtis 1868

- Grammothele mappa Berk. & M.A. Curtis 1868 accepted as Grammothele lineata Berk. & M.A. Curtis, (1868)

Genus: Grandinia Fr. 1838 accepted as Hyphodontia J. Erikss., (1958)

- Grandinia bicolor P.H.B. Talbot 1948 accepted as Dendrodontia bicolor (P.H.B. Talbot) Hjortstam & Ryvarden, (1980)
- Grandinia rosea Henn. 1905 accepted as Roseograndinia rosea (Henn.) Hjortstam & Ryvarden, (2005)

Genus: Graphina Müll. Arg. 1880

- Graphina acharii (Fée) Müll. Arg. 1887 accepted as Allographa acharii (Fée) Lücking & Kalb, (2018)
- Graphina analoga (Nyl.) Zahlbr. 1927
- Graphina atrofusca Müll. Arg. 1887 accepted as Glyphis atrofusca (Müll. Arg.) Lücking, (2009)
- Graphina bylii (Vain.) Zahlbr. 1932
- Graphina bylii var. lividula (Vain.) Zahlbr. 1932
- Graphina obtrita (Fée) Müll. Arg. 1887
- Graphina pergracilis Zahlbr. 1932
- Graphina platycarpa (Eschw.) Zahlbr. 1902
- Graphina polycarpa Müll. Arg. 1887
- Graphina sophistica (Nyl.) Müll. Arg. 1880

Family: Graphiolaceae Clem. & Shear 1931

Genus: Graphiola Poit. 1824

- Graphiola phoenicis (Moug. ex Fr.) Poit. 1824

Family: Graphidaceae Dumort. 1822 (Lichens)

Genus: Graphis Adans. 1763 (Lichens)

- Graphis acharii Fée 1825 accepted as Allographa acharii (Fée) Lücking & Kalb, (2018)
- Graphis analoga Nyl. 1859
- Graphis analoga f. tetraspora Stizenb.*
- Graphis atrofusca (Müll. Arg.) Stizenb. 1891
- Graphis bylii Vain. 1926
- Graphis bylii var. lividula Vain. 1926
- Graphis caesiopruinosa (Fée) Kremp. 1875 accepted as Phaeographina caesiopruinosa (Fée) Müll. Arg., (1887)
- Graphis cicatricosa (Ach.) Vain. 1890 accepted as Glyphis cicatricosa Ach., (1814)
- Graphis cicatricosa var. confluens (Zenker) Vain. 1890 accepted as Glyphis cicatricosa Ach., (1814)
- Graphis cicatricosa var. simplicior Vain. 1890
- Graphis denudans Vain. 1926
- Graphis devestiens Nyl. 1891
- Graphis diaphoroides Müll. Arg. 1886
- Graphis intertexta Nyl. (sic) possibly Müll. Arg. 1895
- Graphis intricata Fée 1825
- Graphis inusta var. emergens Vain. ex Van der Byl 1931
- Graphis mesographa Nyl. 1863
- Graphis polycarpa (Müll. Arg.) Stizenb. 1891
- Graphis scripta (L.) Ach. 1809
- Graphis sophistica Nyl. 1863
- Graphis striatula (Ach.) Spreng. 1827 accepted as Allographa striatula (Ach.) Lücking & Kalb, (2018)
- Graphis subfarinacea Nyl. 1891
- Graphis subolivacea Zahlbr. 1926

== Gu ==
Genus: Guepinia Fr. 1825

- Guepinia agariciformis Lloyd 1923 accepted as Dacryopinax spathularia (Schwein.) G.W. Martin, (1948)
- Guepinia fissa Berk. 1843
- Guepinia flabellata Cooke 1884 accepted as Inflatostereum glabrum (Pat.) D.A. Reid, (1965)
- Guepinia palmiceps Berk. 1843
- Guepinia petaloides Kalchbr. 1882
- Guepinia sparassoides Kalchbr. 1882
- Guepinia spathularia (Schwein.) Fr. 1828 accepted as Dacryopinax spathularia (Schwein.) G.W. Martin, (1948)
- Guepinia spathularia f. lata Lloyd.*

Genus: Guignardia Viala & Ravaz 1892, accepted as Phyllosticta Pers., (1818)

- Guignardia bidwellii (Ellis) Viala & Ravaz 1892 accepted as Phyllosticta ampelicida (Engelm.) Aa, (1973)

== Gy ==
Genus: Gyalecta Ach. 1808

- Gyalecta thunbergiana Ach. 1810 accepted as Diploschistes thunbergianus (Ach.) Lumbsch & Vězda, (1993)

Family: Gyalectaceae Stizenb. 1862

Order: Gymnoascales G. Winter 1884

Family: Gymnoascaceae Imperfectae

Family: Gymnocarpeae

Genus: Gymnoglossum Massee 1891

- Gymnoglossum radiatum (Lloyd) Bottomley 1948 accepted as Aroramyces radiatus (Lloyd) Castellano, Verbeken & Walleyn, (2000)

Genus: Gyrodon Opat. 1836

- Gyrodon capensis Sacc. 1896

Family: Gyrophoraceae Zenker 1827

Genus: Gyrophragmium Mont. 1843

- Gyrophragmium delilei Mont. 1843
- Gyrophragmium inquinans (Berk.) Lloyd 1904

Genus: Gyrostomum Fr. 1825, accepted as Glyphis Ach., (1814) (Lichens)

- Gyrostomum scyphuliferum (Ach.) Nyl. 1862 accepted as Glyphis scyphulifera (Ach.) Staiger, (2002)

== See also ==
- List of bacteria of South Africa
- List of Oomycetes of South Africa
- List of slime moulds of South Africa
- List of fungi of South Africa
  - List of fungi of South Africa – A
  - List of fungi of South Africa – B
  - List of fungi of South Africa – C
  - List of fungi of South Africa – D
  - List of fungi of South Africa – E
  - List of fungi of South Africa – F
  - List of fungi of South Africa – G
  - List of fungi of South Africa – H
  - List of fungi of South Africa – I
  - List of fungi of South Africa – J
  - List of fungi of South Africa – K
  - List of fungi of South Africa – L
  - List of fungi of South Africa – M
  - List of fungi of South Africa – N
  - List of fungi of South Africa – O
  - List of fungi of South Africa – P
  - List of fungi of South Africa – Q
  - List of fungi of South Africa – R
  - List of fungi of South Africa – S
  - List of fungi of South Africa – T
  - List of fungi of South Africa – U
  - List of fungi of South Africa – V
  - List of fungi of South Africa – W
  - List of fungi of South Africa – X
  - List of fungi of South Africa – Y
  - List of fungi of South Africa – Z
