= Geastrum jurei =

Scientific classification
- Domain: Eukaryota
- Kingdom: Fungi
- Division: Basidiomycota
- Class: Agaricomycetes
- Order: Geastrales
- Family: Geastraceae
- Genus: Geastrum
- Species: G. jurei

Binomial name
- Geastrum jurei Lazo
- G. jurei is found in Algarrobo (circle), Valparaíso Province (red), in Chile

Geastrum jurei Mycological characteristics
- Glebal hymenium
- No distinct cap
- Spore print is brown
- Ecology is saprotrophic
- Edibility is inedible

Geastrum jurei is a species of fungus in the Geastrales, or earthstar fungi. It is known only from Algarrobo, in the Valparaíso province of Chile. It is a fornicate species of earthstar, meaning that the tips of the rays press down so as to raise the spherical spore sac into the air.

== Taxonomy ==
Based on the characteristics of the exoperidium (the outer tissue layer of the peridium), Geastrum jurei is classified in the section Perimyceliata Stanek. It is distinguished from other fornicate earthstars: Geastrum smardae and G. welwitschii belong to the section Basimyceliata, G. quadrifidium has a clearly defined peristome (an opening on top of the spore sac) and G. fornicatum has a peristome the same color as the endoperidium. Although the species G. dissimile appeared to be related, Lazo examined the type specimen, and proved it to be different not only by a more sulcate mouth (with deep narrow furrows or grooves) but also by other macroscopic and microscopic characters (e.g., smaller spores with acute spines).

Known from Chile, the species was described in 1972, based on specimens found in Algarrobo, Valparaíso, in 1966. The specific epithet is dedicated to professor Ricardo Jure M.

== Description ==
The exoperidium is 26 mm (1.0 in) wide, 15 mm (0.59 in) high, and split into five broadly acute rays. The outer surface is strongly encrusted with sand and debris; the fibrillose layer is hard, on the outside shining, pale ochraceous, on the inside chestnut. The pseudoparenchymatic layer is thin, dark brown with a violaceous tinge, cracked, especially on the rays, and hard like wood. The pedicel is 2 by 4 mm broad and 2 mm high, compressed, smooth, and cream-colored. The endoperidium (the inner tissue layer of the peridium) is round, 9 mm broad and 8 mm high, depressed, the same color as the pseudoparenchymatic layer, and smooth. The peristome is roughly conical, silky, slightly radially wrinkled (but not sulcate), and very pale grayish brown. The peristome is indefinite, but due to its color it is well-distinguished from the endoperidium.

The spores are 5–5.5 μm broad, reddish brown, spherical, with warts that are short and irregular. The capillitium is 5–8 μm in diameter, reddish brown, thin walled, nonseptate, without any branches.

== Habitat and distribution ==
The fruit bodies of Geastrum jurei grow on sandy soil close to the beach. They have only been reported from Chile.
