= Dentocorticium hyphopaxillosum =

Scientific classification
- Domain: Eukaryota
- Kingdom: Fungi
- Division: Basidiomycota
- Class: Agaricomycetes
- Order: Polyporales
- Family: Polyporaceae
- Genus: Dentocorticium
- Species: D. hyphopaxillosum

Binomial name
- Dentocorticium hyphopaxillosum (M.J.Li & H.S.Yuan) Nakasone & S.H.He (2018)

Synonyms
- Dendrodontia hyphopaxillosa M.J.Li & H.S.Yuan (2014)

Species of fungus

Dentocorticium hyphopaxillosum is a species of crust fungus in the family Polyporaceae. It is found in the Guangxi Autonomous Region of southern China, where it grows on fallen angiosperm branches. It was first described in 2014 as Dendrodontia hyphopaxillosa by mycologists Meng-Jie Li and Hai-Sheng Yuan, who thought it was related to other species of Dendrodontia based on morphological characteristics. It was transferred to the genus Dentocorticium in 2018 based on phylogenetic analysis; Dendrodontia was synonymized with Dentocorticium. Characteristics of D. hyphopaxillosum include its crust-like fruit bodies, cylindrical hyphal pegs, contorted dendrohyphidia that are frequently branched, and spores with an ellipsoid to somewhat cylindrical shape.
