= Dentocorticium irregulare =

Scientific classification
- Domain: Eukaryota
- Kingdom: Fungi
- Division: Basidiomycota
- Class: Agaricomycetes
- Order: Polyporales
- Family: Polyporaceae
- Genus: Dentocorticium
- Species: D. irregulare

Binomial name
- Dentocorticium irregulare Ryvarden (1978)

Species of fungus

Dentocorticium irregulare is a species of crust fungus in the family Polyporaceae. It was described as new to science in 1978 (as Dentocorticium irregularis) by Norwegian mycologist Leif Ryvarden. It was found growing on the bark of a deciduous tree in Akagera National Park, near Lake Ihema, in Rwanda. Fruitbodies are white, crust-like, and have a cheesy consistency. The spore-bearing (hymenial) surface features shallow and irregular pores, flattened "teeth", and ridges. The spores are cylindrical, hyaline (translucent), and measure 6.5–9–3–4.5 μm.
