= Glyphis frischiana =

Scientific classification
- Kingdom: Fungi
- Division: Ascomycota
- Class: Lecanoromycetes
- Order: Graphidales
- Family: Graphidaceae
- Genus: Glyphis
- Species: G. frischiana

Binomial name
- Glyphis frischiana Kalb (2020)

Species of lichen

Glyphis frischiana is a species of corticolous (bark-dwelling) script lichen in the family Graphidaceae. It is distinguished by its large ascospores, single-spored asci, and the presence of stictic acid as a major metabolite. Found on the trunk of Eucalyptus trees in Cameroon, it is similar in appearance to Glyphis atrofusca but can be distinguished by these key characteristics.

== Taxonomy ==
Glyphis frischiana was first formally described as a new species by German lichenologist Klaus Kalb in 2020. The type specimen was collected in Nkwentang Village, Ndu Subdivision (Donga-Mantung, Northwest Region). It was found on the trunk of a Eucalyptus tree in a small plantation, at 1,950 m (6,400 ft) above sea level. The specific epithet, frischiana, was chosen to honour Dr. Andreas Frisch, an expert in Ostropales and Arthoniales, who collected the type during his PhD studies.

Glyphis frischiana belongs to the subgenus Pallidoglyphis within the genus Glyphis, along with G. atrofusca and G. substriatula.

== Description ==
The thallus of Glyphis frischiana is corticolous, with a thin, smooth, and corticate surface. It appears dull and is partly verrucose, with the verrucae densely filled with clusters of crystals. The thallus is approximately 75 μm thick. Ascomata are erumpent to sessile, with a thick lateral margin and can be up to 4 mm long and 0.5 mm wide. They are straight, curved, or sinuous and may be simple, trifurcate, or irregularly branched. The proper exciple is black and distinctly visible from above, while the disc is open and brown to dark brown. The exciple is laterally carbonized and hyaline to brownish at the base.

The hymenium is 110–150 μm high and clear, with a granular, light to dark brownish epithecium. The hypothecium is hyaline, and the paraphyses are thin, surrounded by a thick jelly. Ascospores are hyaline, becoming very slightly brownish with age, densely muriform, measuring 55–110 by 28–35 μm, and iodine-positive brownish-blue or violet-blue.

Glyphis frischiana contains stictic acid as its major secondary metabolite, with constictic acid and menegazziaic acid present in minor amounts.

=== Similar species ===
Although it may easily be confused with a Graphis species, Glyphis frischiana can be distinguished by its brown, potassium hydroxide-negative epithecium and thick-walled paraphyses embedded in a jelly. When compared to Graphis streblocarpa, Glyphis frischiana differs in the absence of a brown pruina, convergent labia, and a non-visible disc.
