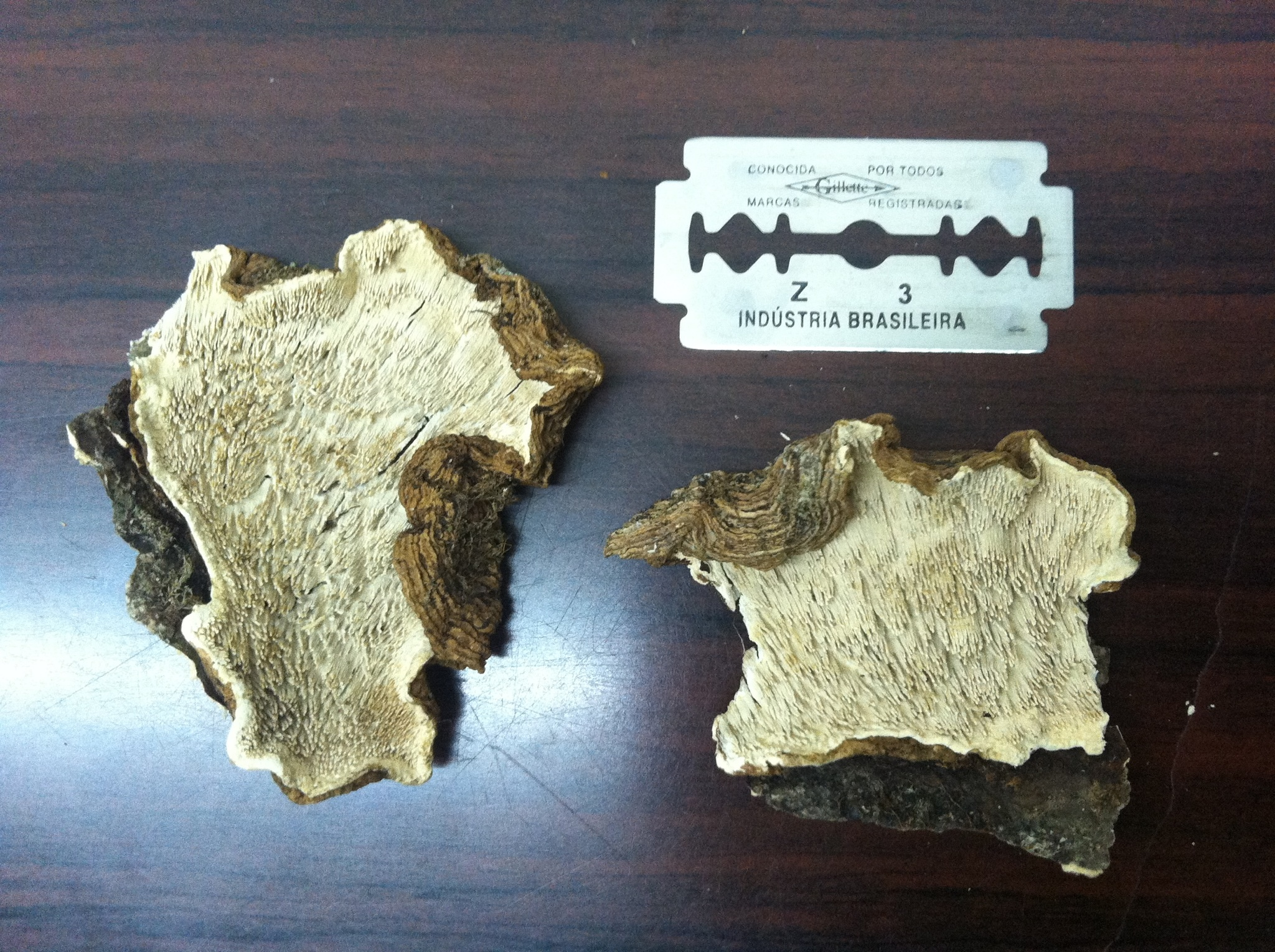
- Dentocorticium portoricense

Scientific classification
- Kingdom: Fungi
- Division: Basidiomycota
- Class: Agaricomycetes
- Order: Polyporales
- Family: Polyporaceae
- Genus: Dentocorticium (Parmasto) M.J.Larsen & Gilb. (1974)

Type species
- Dentocorticium ussuricum (Parmasto) M.J.Larsen & Gilb. (1974)

Species
- D. bicolor D. hyphopaxillosum D. irregulare D. portoricense D. sulphurellum D. taiwanianum D. ussuricum

Synonyms
- Laeticorticium sect. Dentocorticium Parmasto (1968); Dendrodontia Hjortstam & Ryvarden (1980); Fuscocerrena Ryvarden (1982)

= Dentocorticium =

Genus of fungi

Dentocorticium is a genus of six species of poroid fungi in the family Polyporaceae. The genus was revised in 2018, with several new species added and some older species transferred to other genera, based on phylogenetic analyses.

== Taxonomy ==
Erast Parmasto first described Dentocorticium in 1968 as a section of Laeticorticium, a defunct genus that was classified in the Corticiaceae. Dentocorticium was raised to generic status by M.J. Larsen and Robert Lee Gilbertson in 1974.

Dendrodontia and Fuscocerrena were shown to be synonyms of Dentocorticium in a 2018 phylogenetic analyses. Dendrodontia was circumscribed by Kurt Hjortstam and Leif Ryvarden in 1980 to contain Dendrodontia bicolor (formerly Grandinia bicolor). Fuscocerrena was created by Ryvarden in 1982 to house Fuscocerrena portoricensis.

== Description ==
The fruit bodies of Dentocorticium fungi are annual. They range from effused (crust-like), to effused-reflexed (crust-like with edges curling to form rudimentary caps) or cap-like, with a texture ranging from membranous, to leathery or soft corky. The spore-bearing surface are often tooth-like, bumpy with tubercles, or spiny. In some species the surface is poroid, daedaleoid (maze-like), and sometimes develops irregular ridges or hyphal pegs (bundles of hyphae that project from the hymenium).

Dentocorticium has a dimitic or trimitic hyphal system. The generative hyphae have clamp connections. There are brown skeletal hyphae present in the subiculum (a layer of loosely intertwined hyphae forming a mat covering the substrate and underlying the fruit body), spine trama, and hyphal pegs. Microbinding hyphae may be present in the subiculum or the substrate. Dendrohyphidia are present. Cylindrical to somewhat spindle shaped cystidia may be present. Basidia are club shaped and have four sterigmata. Spores are ellipsoid to cylindrical in shape, translucent with thin walls, and smooth. They do not react with Melzer's reagent, and acyanophilous (having cell walls that do not readily absorb cotton blue stain).

== Species ==
- Dentocorticium bicolor (P.H.B.Talbot) Nakasone & S.H.He (2018) – southern Africa; Australia; East Asia; North America; South America
- Dentocorticium hyphopaxillosum (M.J.Li & H.S.Yuan) Nakasone & S.H.He (2018) – China
- Dentocorticium irregulare Ryvarden (1978) – Africa
- Dentocorticium portoricense (Spreng. ex Fr.) Nakasone & S.H.He (2018) – North America; South America
- Dentocorticium sulphurellum (Peck) M.J.Larsen & Gilb. (1974) – North America
- Dentocorticium taiwanianum (H.C.Wang & Sheng H.Wu) Nakasone & S.H.He (2018) – China; Taiwan
- Dentocorticium ussuricum (Parmasto) M.J.Larsen & Gilb. (1974) – east Asia

Several species once placed in this genus were transferred elsewhere:

- Dentocorticium blastanos Boidin & Gilles (1998) = Neocampanella blastanos (Boidin & Gilles) Nakasone, Hibbett & Goranova (2009)
- Dentocorticium expallens (Bres.) Domański (1988) = Crustomyces expallens (Bres.) Hjortstam (1987)
- Dentocorticium pilatii (Parmasto) Duhem & H.Michel (2009) = Phlebiopsis pilatii (Parmasto) Spirin & Miettinen (2016)
- Dentocorticium sasae Boidin, Cand. & Gilles) Boidin, Lanq. & Duhem (1996) = Leptocorticium sasae (Boidin, Cand. & Gilles) Nakasone (2005)
- Dentocorticium utribasidiatum Boidin & Gilles (1998) = Leptocorticium utribasidiatum (Boidin & Gilles) Nakasone (2005)
