= Dentocorticium sulphurellum =

Scientific classification
- Domain: Eukaryota
- Kingdom: Fungi
- Division: Basidiomycota
- Class: Agaricomycetes
- Order: Polyporales
- Family: Polyporaceae
- Genus: Dentocorticium
- Species: D. sulphurellum

Binomial name
- Dentocorticium sulphurellum (Peck) M.J.Larsen & Gilb. (1974)

Synonyms
- Hydnum sulphurellum Peck (1879); Grandinia sulphurella (Peck) Burt (1879); Odontia sulphurella (Peck) Rick (1932); Laeticorticium sulphurellum (Peck) Gilb. (1963); Dendrodontia sulphurella (Peck) Boidin & Gilles (1998)

Species of fungus

Dentocorticium sulphurellum is a species of crust fungus in the family Polyporaceae. It is characterized by its toothed surface, its sulphur-yellow colour, and microscopically by the presence of dendrohyphidia in the hymenium. Charles Horton Peck originally described it in 1879 as Hydnum sulphurellum; it was transferred to Dentocorticium in 1974. It is found in North America and Japan.
