= Colletotrichum glycines =

Scientific classification
- Domain: Eukaryota
- Kingdom: Fungi
- Division: Ascomycota
- Class: Sordariomycetes
- Order: Glomerellales
- Family: Glomerellaceae
- Genus: Colletotrichum
- Species: C. glycines

Binomial name
- Colletotrichum glycines Hori ex Hemmi (1920)

Synonyms
- Colletotrichum caulivorum Heald & F.A.Wolf (1911); Colletotrichum glycines Hori ex Hemmi (1920); Glomerella glycines Lehman & F.A.Wolf (1925)

Species of fungus

Colletotrichum glycines is a species of fungus in the family Glomerellaceae. It is a plant pathogen, causing soybean and tomato anthracnose. It is the teleomorph form of Glomerella glycines.

== See also ==
- List of soybean diseases
