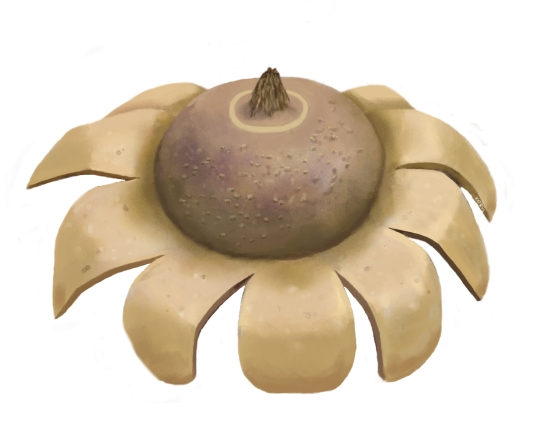

Scientific classification
- Domain: Eukaryota
- Kingdom: Fungi
- Division: Basidiomycota
- Class: Agaricomycetes
- Order: Geastrales
- Family: Geastraceae
- Genus: Geastrum
- Species: G. corollinum

Binomial name
- Geastrum corollinum (Batsch) Hollós (1904)

Synonyms
- Lycoperdon corollinum Batsch (1783); Lycoperdon recolligens With. (1792); Geastrum recolligens (With.) Desvaux (1809); Geastrum mammosum Chevall. (1826)

= Geastrum corollinum =

Geastrum corollinum Mycological characteristics
- Glebal hymenium
- No distinct cap
- Hymenium attachment is not applicable
- Lacks a stipe
- Spore print is brown
- Ecology is saprotrophic
- Edibility is inedible

Geastrum corollinum is an inedible species of mushroom belonging to the genus Geastrum, or earthstar fungi. First described scientifically by German naturalist August Johann Georg Karl Batsch in 1792 as Lycoperdon corollinum, it was transferred to the genus Geastrum by László Hollós in 1904.
