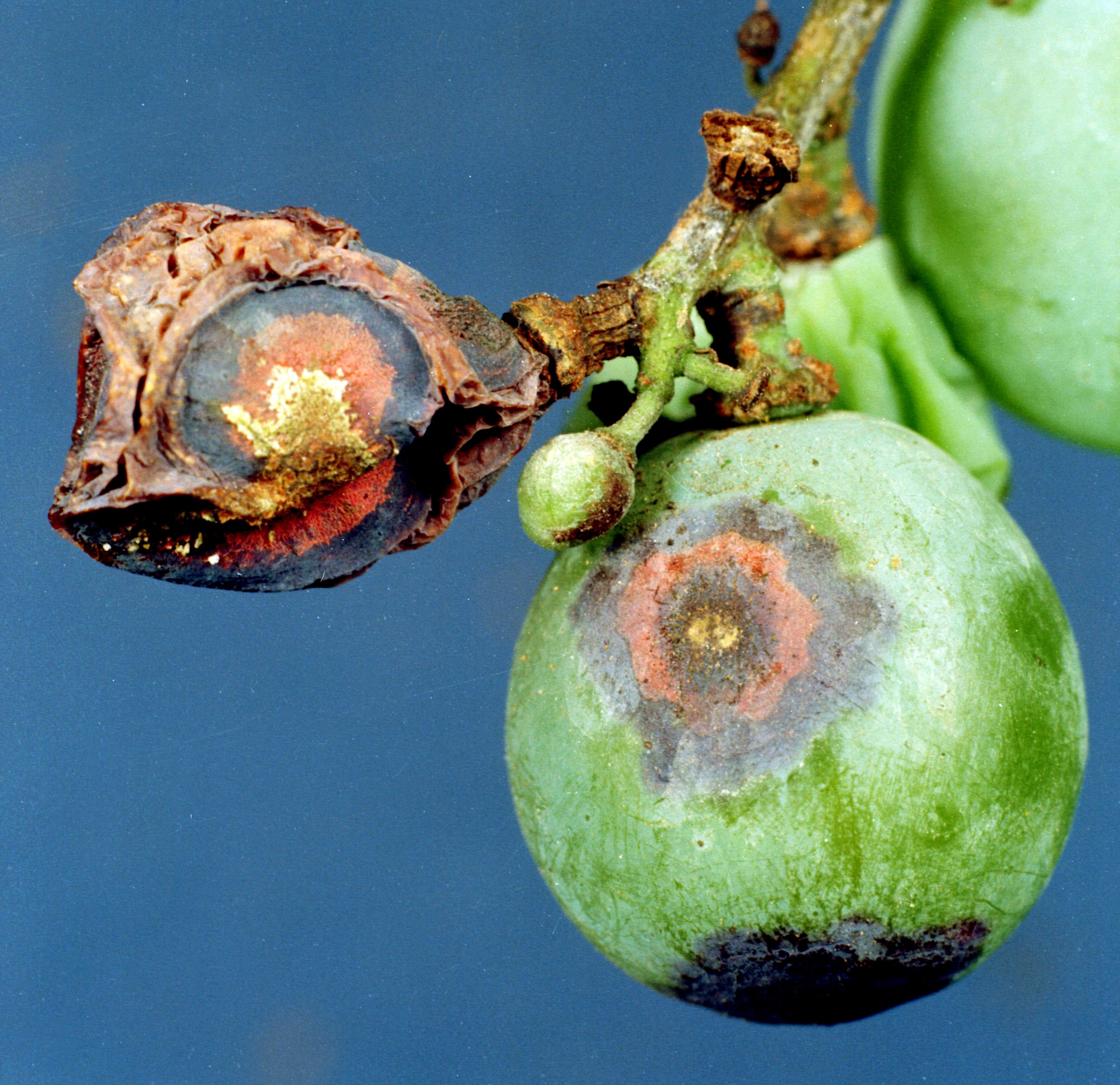

Scientific classification
- Kingdom: Fungi
- Division: Ascomycota
- Class: Dothideomycetes
- Order: Myriangiales
- Family: Elsinoaceae
- Genus: Elsinoë
- Species: E. ampelina

Binomial name
- Elsinoë ampelina Shear (1929)

Synonyms
- Gloeosporium ampelophagum (Pass.) Sacc., (1878); Ramularia ampelophaga Pass., (1876); Sphaceloma ampelinum de Bary, (1874)

= Elsinoë ampelina =

Species of fungus

Elsinoë ampelina is a plant pathogen, which is the causal agent of anthracnose on grape.

This type of anthracnose affects several plant varieties, including some brambles and wine grapes. Grape anthracnose can be identified by the "bird's eye" lesions on the berries and sunken black or greyish lesions on leaves and shoots. From these lesions, conidia are produced. This disease can be lethal to the plant, either through defoliation and removal of photosynthetic capacity, or through injury to the active regions of the vine. Grape anthracnose is particularly important to the wine industry, as it can decrease quality and quantity of berries produced as well as kill the vine outright, leading to large economic losses, in particular during the middle summer months.

== Hosts and symptoms ==
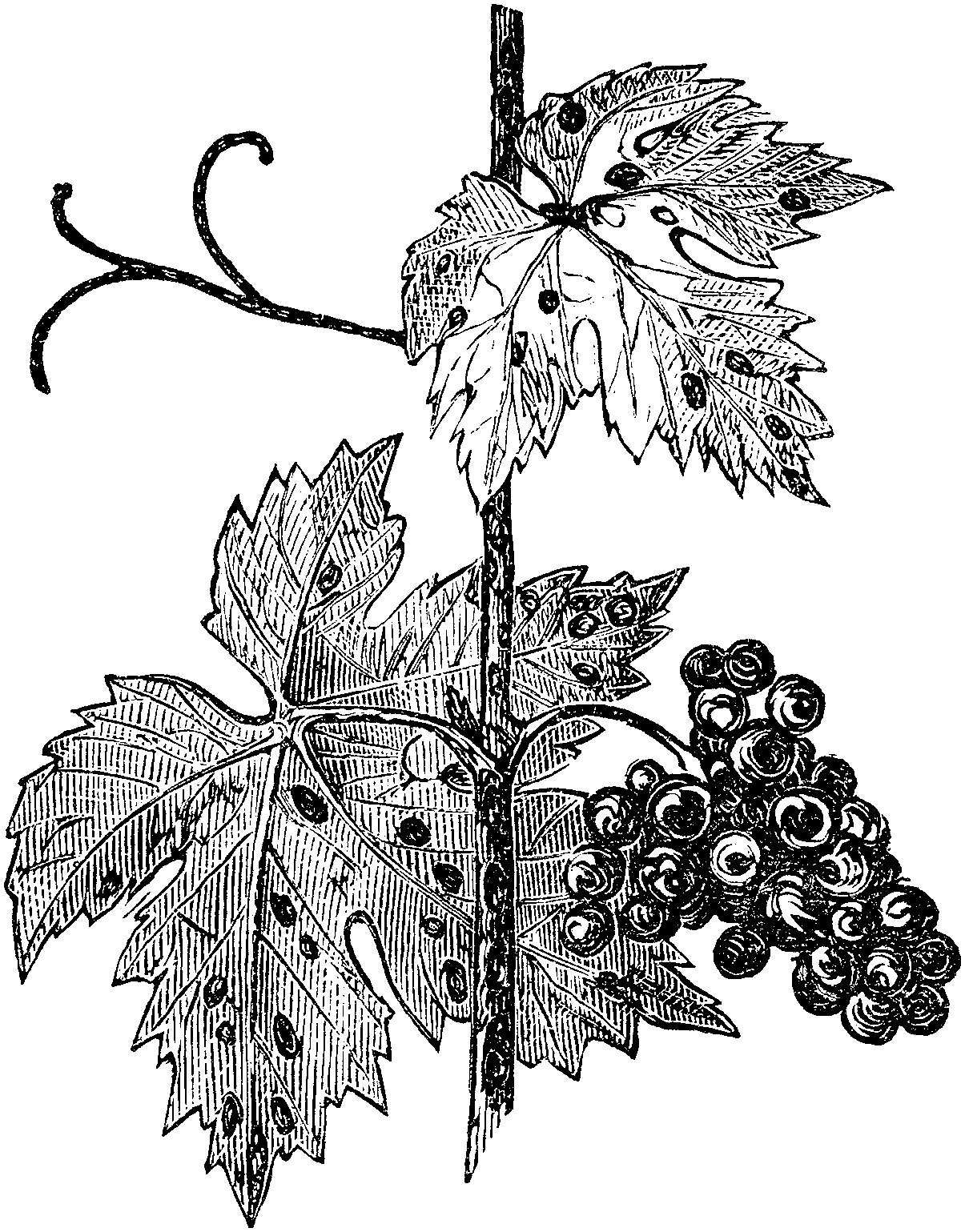
Illustration from 1892 depicting Grape Anthranose symptoms on grape shoots, leaves, and berries.

E. ampelina affects two species of Rubus and three species of Vitis. Specifically, E. ampelina affects blackberries, raspberries, mountain grapes, fox or concord grapes, and the European wine grape. Anthracnose diseases can cause disease on a variety of plants, but the primary host for E. ampelina, is grape.

Anthracnose on grape presents itself as lesions on shoots, leaves, and berries. Lesions will first appear on young shoots, showing up as small circular reddish spots that will later become larger and create grey lesions which appear sunken. The lesions will eventually develop margins that are a dark reddish-brown to violet-black color. If left untreated, lesions on shoots will become larger and eventually kill the shoot. While these lesions may be very apparent and easy to identify, they can sometimes be confused for hail damage. Hail damage typically appears on only one side of the plants. Also, anthracnose lesions will have darker and more raised edge.

Anthracnose lesions on leaves and petioles look very similar to those on shoots. However, on leaves, the lesions will have dry grey or white centers that will eventually fall off, leaving a hole. This response by the plant is called a shot-hole. Should the lesions spread and the infection make it into the vascular system of the leaf, the anthracnose will prevent the proper development of the leaf and will lead to malformation or to the drying of the leaf.

Grape vines are susceptible to anthracnose before flowering all the way through fruit soften and coloration. Essentially, the berries are susceptible to the pathogen throughout the growing season. Anthracnose presents itself on the berries as small reddish circles, around a quarter inch in diameter, that will become sunken with a narrow dark brown to black border. Eventually, the center of the lesion will change color from violet to white or grey and become velvety. These lesions often look like a shooting target or bullseye. Should the disease spread to and affect the pulp of the berry, it will cause cracking, which opens the berry to secondary infections.

== Disease cycle ==
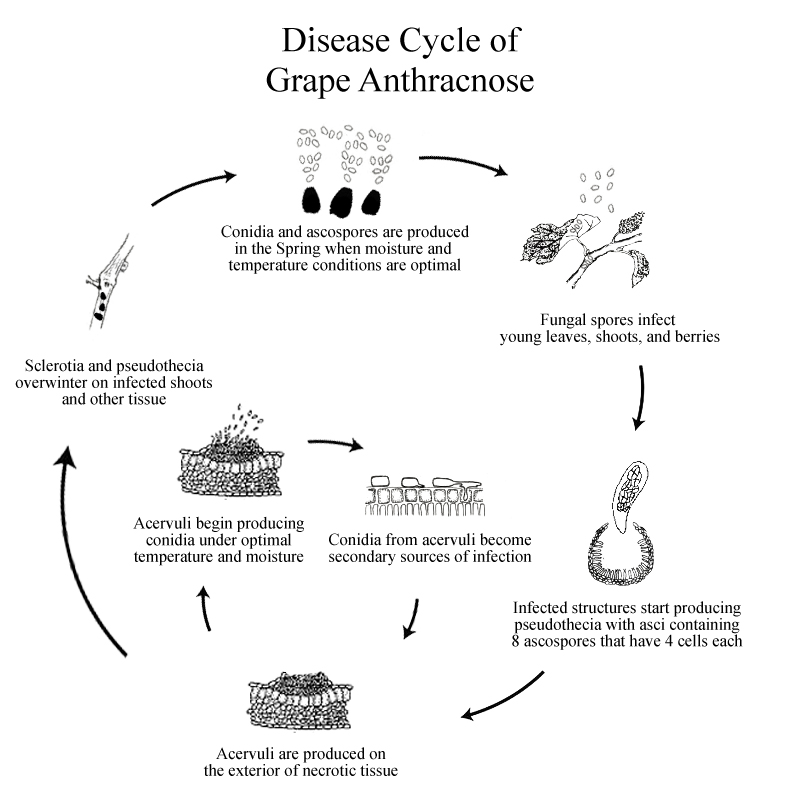
Disease cycle of Elsinoe ampelina, causal agent of Anthracnose in grapes.

Late in the season, the Grape Anthracnose fungus produces sclerotia, which are located primarily at the edge of the infected lesions on shoots. Unlike acervuli, sclerotia serves as the overwintering structures. Because the fungus over-winters in dormant and dead canes—one-year-old wood that starts to become lignified—disease control becomes very difficult.

Large numbers of conidia are disseminated from sclerotia in the spring when there are wet periods of 24 hours and temperature is above 36 °F (2 °C). The conidia infect the young leaves, shoots, and berries of the grape vine. Conidia will germinate, causing primary inoculum under the following circumstances: presence of free water in 12 hours and adequate temperature (36–90 °F (2–32 °C)). In fact, primary inoculum of Grape Anthracnose is possible even before bud break. The infection rate will escalate with increases in temperature. Development of disease symptom is also temperature-dependent: within 13 days at 36 °F, or within 4 days at 90 °F.

Simultaneously, ascospores are produced on the lesions of infected canes or berries left on the trellis system or on the vineyard floor to carry out the infection. These ascospores are formed in asci, which are in cavities within a stroma—the dense structural tissue that produces fruiting bodies in fungi—of pseudothecium. Pseudothecium of grape anthracnose, the sexual fruiting body of the fungus, has asci containing eight four-celled ascospores. The fungus also overwinters as pseudothecium, but the importance of ascospores in disease development is not clearly understood. The study done by Mirica (1998) validated that the ascospores do germinate and infect the tissue and produce the Sphaceloma phase which shows the existence of the perfect stage of Elsinoe ampelina. Overall, conidia and ascospores overwinter on the ground and on infected tissue and become the source of primary inoculum.

Throughout spring and summer, the fungus produces acervuli on the exterior of the necrotic areas at their mature stage. Under wet condition, these acervuli form conidia. The conidia from acervuli becomes the secondary sources of infection for the remainder of the growing seasons.

In summary, the disease cycle of Elsinoe Ampelina is as follows: 1) the fungus overwinters by forming both pseudothecium and sclerotia, 2) the spores from both structures cause primary inoculum and form mycelium on the infected lesions, 3) acervuli disseminate conidia which becomes the source of secondary inoculum.

As mentioned earlier, grape anthracnose is dependent upon moisture and temperature. It can be exacerbated during heavy rainfall and hail, or by overhead irrigation.

== Environment ==
Grape anthracnose can be found where ever grapes are grown, however it is more prevalent in certain areas. It thrives under warm and wet conditions. Both primary and secondary inoculum are spread by the splashing of rain on to new tissue. Moisture is required for the germination of conidia on tissue. New tissue is the most vulnerable to infection. Overgrown vines also promote infection as they take longer to dry out after dew or rain, often due to decreased air flow in the canopy. The disease can become even more severe in areas of poorly drained soil or during years of heavy rainfall or rain coupled with high temperatures.

== Management ==
Sanitation is a critical factor in controlling grape anthracnose. The removal of infected tissues is done during the dormant stage, often when it is cold and dry in the winter months. The infected tissue must be then be destroyed upon removal. This reduces the amount of primary inoculum available to be released in the spring.

Wild grape varieties in proximity to cultivated grapes should be removed. The wild species can host grape anthracnose and are a source of primary inoculum. Because the conidia are spread by water splashing, it is not crucial to eliminate all wild grapes, just the ones near the cultivated grapes.

Planting varieties with resistance or tolerance to grape anthracnose can aid in management of the disease. American varieties like 'Concord' and 'Niagara' have more resistance to the disease, while French hybrids and Vitis vinifera are more susceptible to infection. Specific susceptible hybrid grape cultivars include 'Vidal', 'Mars', 'Marquis', and 'Reliance'.

Canopy upkeep can be an important preventive measure when dealing with anthracnose. Proper pruning and training will increase air flow around the plant and thus reduce the drying time of external tissue surfaces. Appropriate care is especially crucial for target areas of new growth because they are most susceptible to the pathogen.

Fungicides are a control measure commonly used once grape anthracnose has become established in a vineyard. The most important fungicide application occurs in early spring during the dormant period before bud swell. A lime-sulfur solution is most commonly used. This is typically applied at a rate of ten gallons per acre. Commercially available Sulforix can also be used at a rate of one gallon per acre. Both fungicides target the sclerotia overwintering in the canes. This dormant fungicide application is then followed up throughout the season by foliar sprays—sprays that target the surface of foliage. These sprays help protect the new susceptible tissues. Foliar sprays are typically recommended at two-week intervals. Other commercial products often used include Mancozeb, Captan, Ziram, Sovran, Rally, Elite, Inspire Super, Adamant, Mettle, Revus Top, Vintage, and Pristine. The majority of these fungicides are sterol inhibitors and a few are EBDCs—non-systemic, surface-acting fungicides. It is important to use fungicides with different modes of action to avoid resistance development.

Another control method is ensuring the use of disease-free plantings, although phytosanitary regulations ban the movement of infected plants and propagules. The best way to ensure one is getting disease-free plantings is to buy them from a certified operation with disease-tested grape vines.

== Importance ==
Grape anthracnose can be found wherever grapes are grown. Lesions can kill leaves, shoots, the actively growing parts of vines, and cause the berries to be undesirable and unusable. Damage can be seen throughout the growing season, with severe damage in July through September, as the berries are ripening and undergoing veraison. In climates with strong winters, even if the disease does not outright kill the vine, it will reduce its photosynthetic capacity, leading to decreased amounts of carbohydrate reserves in the vine and eventual death in winter as those reserves dry up and the plant is unable to sustain itself. In addition, once the disease afflicts the berries, it will lead to a decrease in quality and quantity, which will have detrimental economic impact as wine makers will have lower volumes of lower quality berries to work with.
