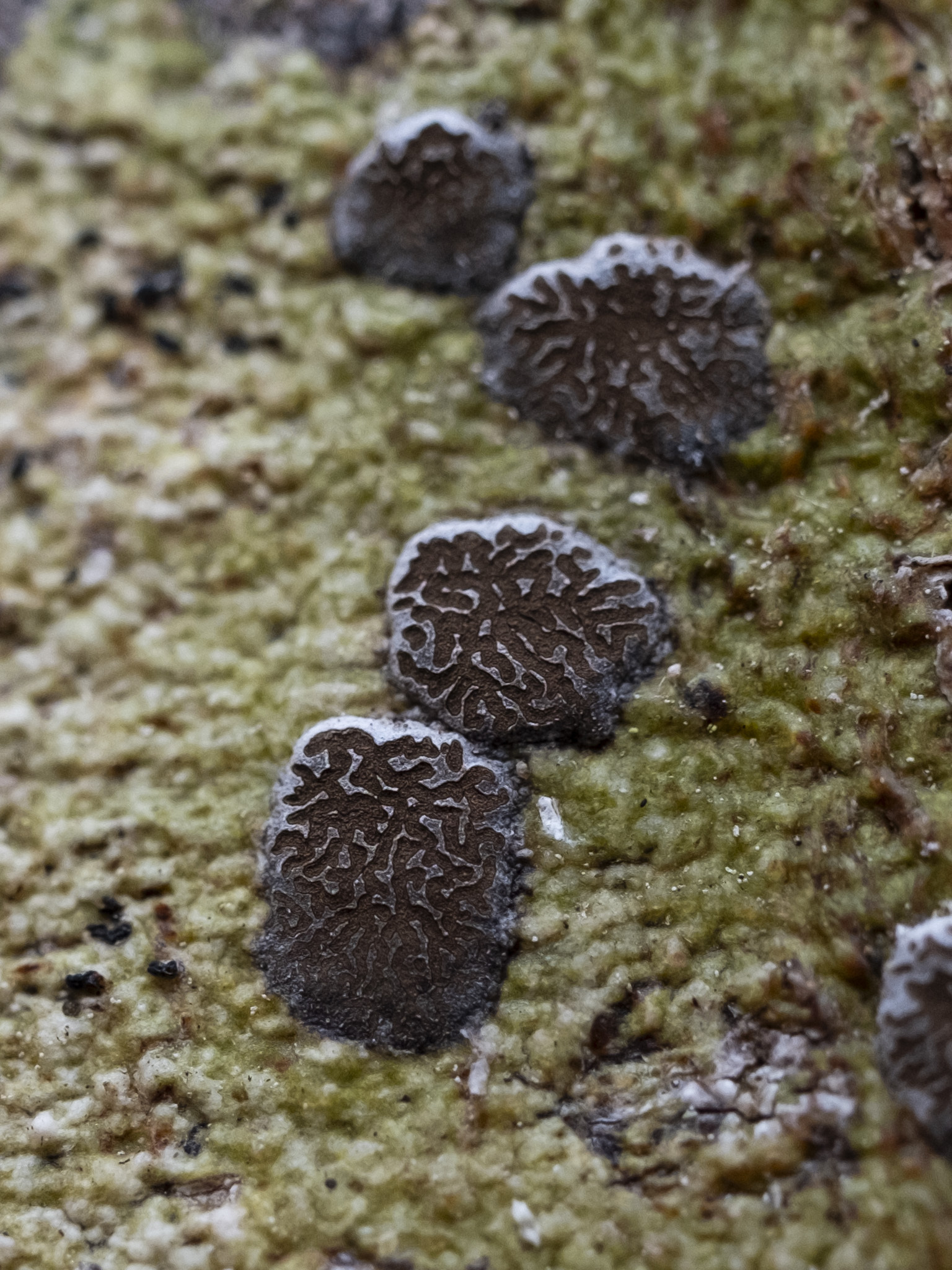
- Close-up of Glyphis cicatricosa

Conservation status
- Apparently Secure (NatureServe)

Scientific classification
- Kingdom: Fungi
- Division: Ascomycota
- Class: Lecanoromycetes
- Order: Graphidales
- Family: Graphidaceae
- Genus: Glyphis
- Species: G. cicatricosa

Binomial name
- Glyphis cicatricosa Ach. (1814)

= Glyphis cicatricosa =

Species of lichen-forming fungus

Glyphis cicatricosa is a crustose lichen in the family Graphidaceae. It has a pantropical distribution, being found in the US, Central and South America, South, South-East and East Asia, Australia, New Zealand and the Pacific. In Nepal, the lichen has been reported at 1,600 m elevation in a compilation of published records.

== In Japan ==
Glyphis cicatricosa has been of some interest in Japan because its distribution is increasing. The species was first identified on the bark of a Phellodendron amurense tree in Tsukuba, where it grow alongside the other lichens Graphis handelii, Lecanora pulverulenta and Pertusaria pertusa.

Some have speculated that the spread of Glyphis cicatricosa in Japan could be a result of climate change related temperature increase, the urban heat island effect, reduced air pollution or a combination of these factors.
