= Dentocorticium bicolor =

Scientific classification
- Domain: Eukaryota
- Kingdom: Fungi
- Division: Basidiomycota
- Class: Agaricomycetes
- Order: Polyporales
- Family: Polyporaceae
- Genus: Dentocorticium
- Species: D. bicolor

Binomial name
- Dentocorticium bicolor (P.H.B.Talbot) Nakasone & S.H.He (2018)

Synonyms
- Grandinia bicolor P.H.B.Talbot (1948)

Species of fungus

Dentocorticium bicolor is a species of fungus in the family Polyporaceae. It was originally described by Patric Henry Brabazon Talbot in 1948 as Grandinia bicolor. The type was collected in the Pietermaritzburg district of Natal Province in South Africa, where it was found growing on dead wood. It has also been found in Australia, East Asia, North America, and South America. The fungus was transferred to genus Dentocorticium in 2018 by Karen Nakasone and Shuang-Hui He based on phylogenetic evidence.
