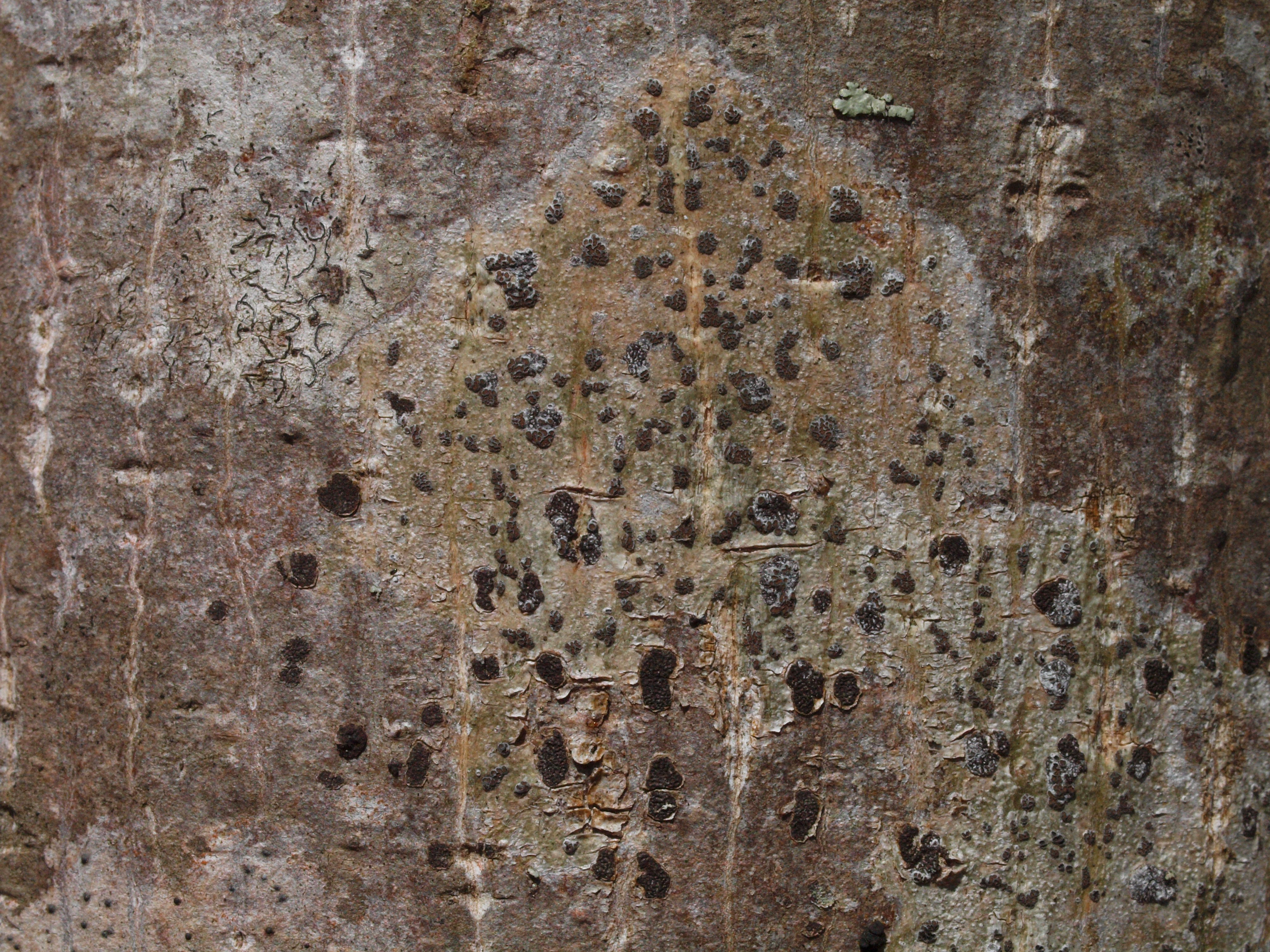
- Glyphis cicatricosa

Scientific classification
- Domain: Eukaryota
- Kingdom: Fungi
- Division: Ascomycota
- Class: Lecanoromycetes
- Order: Graphidales
- Family: Graphidaceae
- Genus: Glyphis; Ach. (1814)

Type species
- Glyphis cicatricosa Ach. (1814)

= Glyphis (lichen) =

Genus of lichens

Glyphis is a genus of lichen-forming fungi in the family Graphidaceae. These lichens form pale grey-green to buff crusts on tree bark and are characterized by elongate, often branched fruiting bodies that appear as black script-like slits against the surface due to their deeply darkened margins and walls. The genus has a pantropical to warm-temperate distribution, growing on the shaded trunks and large branches of mature trees in forests from the Amazon rainforest to Asian evergreen forests, where their durable black markings serve as indicators of long-standing tree substrates.

== Taxonomy ==
The genus was circumscribed by the Swedish lichenologist Erik Acharius in 1814. In his original description, Acharius characterized Glyphis by its crustaceous-cartilaginous receptacle that was flat-expanded and uniform, with a partial structure that was wart-like and formed from the lichen's own substance with proper colouration. He described the apothecia (fruiting bodies) as somewhat cartilaginous, oblong, elongated, and arranged either singly or in small groups, sunken into grooves with impressed margins and a homogeneous interior.

Acharius described four species in his original circumscription: G. labyrinthica (with a brownish-olive crust and black-rimmed elongated apothecia), G. tricosa (with a tawny-yellowish crust and flexuous groove-like apothecia), the type species G. cicatricosa (with an ashy-cinereous crust and black-margined apothecia), and G. favulosa (with an ashy-white crust and black-margined orbicular apothecia). The genus name reflects the characteristic groove-like or carved appearance of the fruiting bodies that distinguishes these lichens from other crustose forms.

== Description ==
Glyphis develops a pale grey-green to buff, sometimes slightly chalky crust (thallus) that lacks a true cortex and can crack into irregular patches on smooth bark. Its fruit bodies are elongate, often branched lirellae whose lips are thick and commonly striate; the margins and lower walls are deeply carbonised, so the script-like slits stand out black against the thallus. A narrow, dark excipulum lines each lirella, while the clear hymenium usually contains simple paraphyses and a dull brown epithecium free of inspersion. The thin-walled, Graphis-type asci hold eight hyaline ascospores that become muriform—divided by many transverse and a few longitudinal septa—measuring roughly 25–80 × 8–18 μm and remaining iodine-negative (I–). Most species are either chemically inert or produce depsidones such as stictic acid or protocetraric acid, rarely with trace amounts of norstictic acid that may tint the epithecium yellow-brown.

== Ecology ==
The genus is pantropical to warm-temperate, with records from lowland Amazon rainforest, West and Central African evergreen forests, South and Southeast Asia, northern Australia and the Gulf–Atlantic Coastal Plain of the United States. All known species are corticolous, colonising the shaded trunks and large branches of mature trees; the widespread G. cicatricosa tolerates modest disturbance and can persist in secondary woodlands and urban parks, whereas narrow endemics such as G. phaeospora and G. japonica are confined to humid, undisturbed interiors of primary forest. Because their black, strongly carbonised lirellae resist bleaching, Glyphis species often remain visible long after neighbouring lichens have weathered away, and their presence is therefore used by field workers as a convenient marker of long-standing arboreal substrates.

== Species ==
As of June 2025, Species Fungorum (in the Catalogue of Life) accept 10 species of Glyphis:

- Glyphis atrofusca (Müll.Arg.) Lücking (2009)
- Glyphis batuana Hardini, Kasiamdari & Purnomo (2018)
- Glyphis cicatricosa Ach. (1814)
- Glyphis cribrosa Fée (1841)
- Glyphis dictyospora Staiger (2002)
- Glyphis frischiana Kalb (2020)
- Glyphis lirellizans Lücking, N.Marín & B.Moncada (2023) – Colombia
- Glyphis montoensis (A.W.Archer) Staiger (2002)
- Glyphis scyphulifera (Ach.) Staiger (2002)
- Glyphis substriatula (Nyl.) Staiger (2002)
