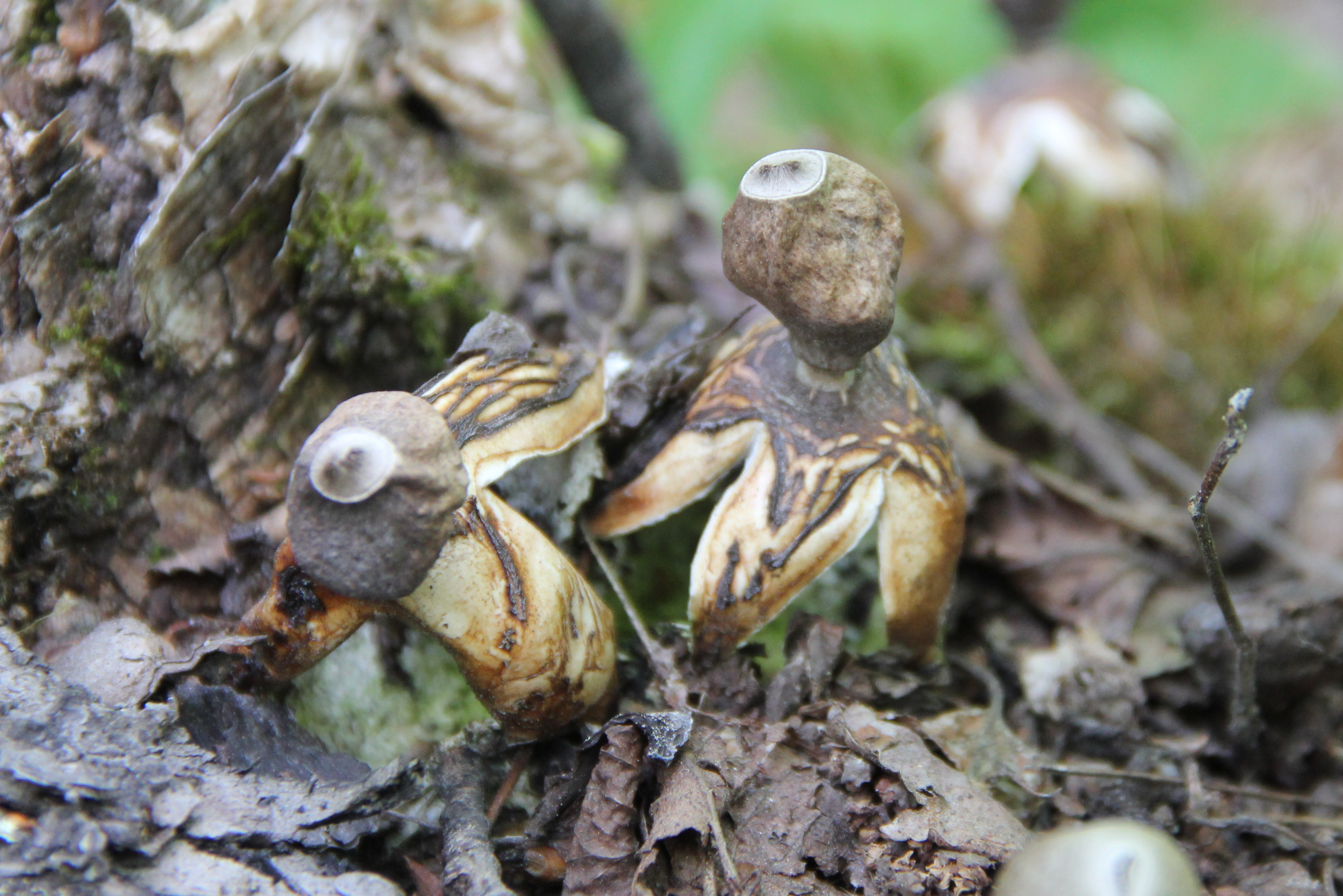

Scientific classification
- Kingdom: Fungi
- Division: Basidiomycota
- Class: Agaricomycetes
- Order: Geastrales
- Family: Geastraceae
- Genus: Geastrum
- Species: G. quadrifidum

Binomial name
- Geastrum quadrifidum Pers.:Pers.

Synonyms
- Lycoperdon coronatum Schaeff. Lycoperdon coronatum Scop. Geaster coronatus (Schaeff.) J. Schröt. Geastrum quadrifidum var. minus Pers. Geastrum minus (Pers.) G. Cunn. auct. non

= Geastrum quadrifidum =

Species of fungus in the family Geastraceaea

Geastrum quadrifidum Mycological characteristics
- Glebal hymenium
- No distinct cap
- Hymenium attachment is not applicable
- Lacks a stipe
- Spore print is brown
- Ecology is saprotrophic
- Edibility is inedible

Geastrum quadrifidum, commonly known as the rayed earthstar or four-footed earthstar, is an inedible species of mushroom belonging to the genus Geastrum, or earthstar fungi. First described scientifically by Christian Hendrik Persoon in 1794, G. quadrifidum is a cosmopolitan—but not common—species of Europe, the Americas, Africa, Asia, and Australasia. The fungus is a saprobe, feeding off decomposing organic matter present in the soil and litter of coniferous forests.

The small, tough, fruit bodies are grayish-brown balls that are initially enclosed by a skin, or peridium, made up of four distinct layers of tissue. The outer tissue layer splits to form star-like rays and expose a circular spore case. Inside the spore case is the gleba—fertile spore-producing tissue that is white and firm when young, but becomes brown and powdery in age. The grayish-brown spore case is set on a short, slender stalk, and has a well-defined narrow pore at the top where mature spores may escape. Fully expanded, the fruit body reaches dimensions up to 2–3 cm (3/4–1 1/4 in) wide and up to about 3 cm (1 1/4 in) tall. The outer skin is purplish-brown, with four or five cream or yellowish-brown colored rays that have their tips stuck in the substrate. There is a flat mat of interwoven mycelia between ray tips. The spores are spherical, warty, and have a diameter of up to 6 μm. Geastrum quadrifidum is one of a number of earthstars whose rays arch downward as they mature, lifting the spore sac upward, high enough to catch air currents that disseminate the spores into new habitats. The species is easily confused with G. fornicatum, a larger earthstar without a well-defined pore mouth.

== Taxonomy ==
The Dutch mycologist Christian Hendrik Persoon published the first official description of Geastrum quadrifidum in 1794, and later sanctioned this name in his 1801 Synopsis Methodica Fungorum (as Geastrum quadrifidum var. minus, a variety now considered synonymous with G. quadrifidum). Although the species had been previously described as Lycoperdon coronatum by Jacob Christian Schaeffer (1763) and Giovanni Antonio Scopoli (1772), then afterward as Geaster coronatus by Joseph Schröter (1889), (Note: This name is not to be confused with Geastrum coronatum, a valid and distinct species that is independent of G. quadrifidum.) the epithet coronatus is not to be used because of the existence of the sanctioned name.

In Japan, G. quadrifidum has occasionally been called "Geastrum minus" (Pers.) G. Cunn. (for example, as in Imai, 1936); within taxonomical terminology, this usage is an auctorum non—a misapplication or misinterpretation of the species name.

According to Stanek's classification of the genus Geastrum, (a classification later endorsed in Sunhede's 1989 monograph of European Geastrum species), G. quadrifidum belongs in the subsection Glabrostoma of the section Perimyceliata, a grouping of similar Geastrum species that incorporate and encrust debris in the mycelial layer, and have an even peristome (opening) that is fibrillose (made of more or less parallel thin thread-like filaments). Several common names for G. quadrifidum have been suggested, including "rayed earthstar", "four-pointed earthstar" and "four-footed earthstar". Samuel Frederick Gray called it the "four-cut shell-puff" in his 1821 The Natural Arrangement of British Plants, but the name was not adopted by subsequent authors. The specific epithet quadrifidum is derived from Latin, and means "four-forks".

== Description ==
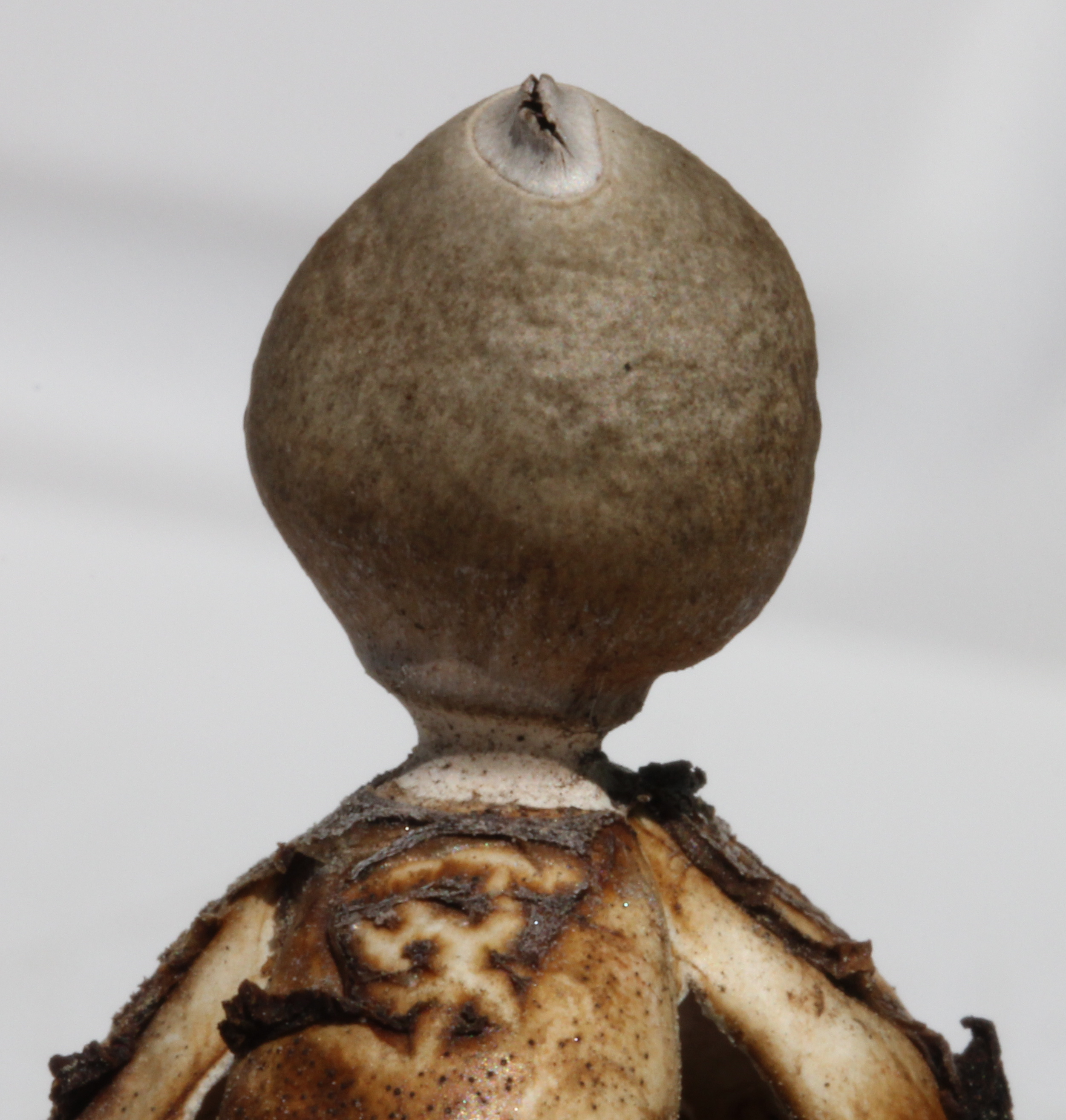
Closeup of spore sac showing detail of peristome (above) and supporting stalk (below)

As in all Geastrum fungi, the internal spore-producing gleba is enclosed in the peridium, a protective structure composed of four layers of tissue: an inner endoperidium, and outer exoperidium that may further be divided into an external mycelial, a tough and membranous middle fibrillose layer, and an internal fleshy layer (known as the pseudoparenchyma). The immature, unopened fruit body is roughly spherical to somewhat flattened or irregular in shape. It lies partly or wholly submerged, encrusted with debris. The expanded fruit body is usually taller than it is wide, about 10–40 mm (3/8–1 5/8 in) high, with mycelial cup included about 15–55 mm (5/8–2 1/8 in). The exoperidium (the outer tissue layer of the four-layered peridium) splits in the middle into three to six, but usually four or five rays. The exoperidium is typically fornicate—a structural feature that arises when the mesoperidium separates from the exoperidium, adhering only at the edge. In this way, the endoperidium (the internal tissue layer that encloses the spore sac) is lifted upwards with the downward movement of the rays. In this species, the tips of the rays remain attached to the mycelial layer, which remain attached to the substrate as a cup in the ground.

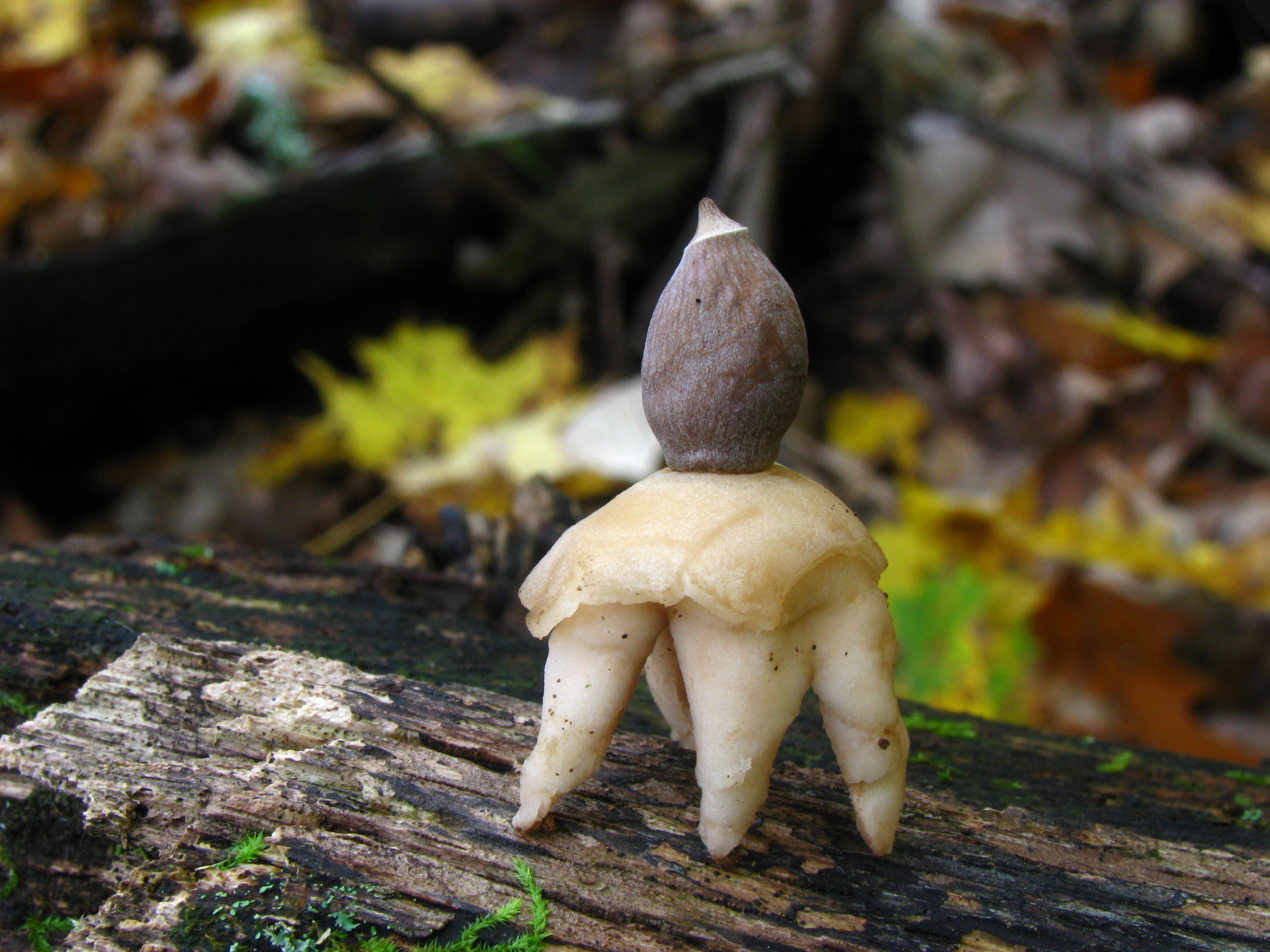
Fresh fruit bodies have a fleshy white to cream-colored exoperidium. This individual has a pseudoparenchymatous collar, the thickness of which hides the short stalk that supports the spore sac.

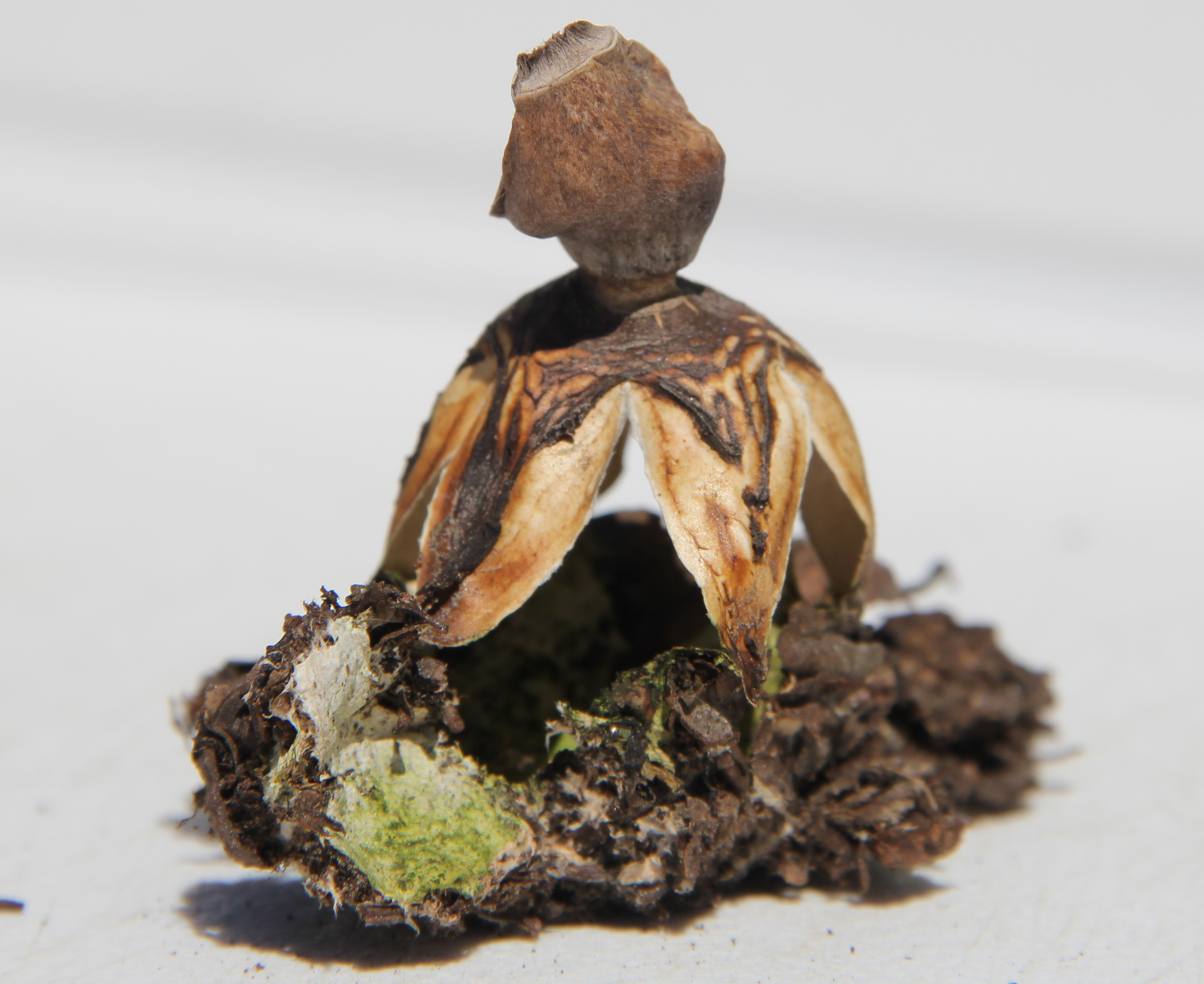
When the pseudoparenchymatous layer dries it shrinks and hardens, darkening to brown; the structure is maintained by the underlying stiff papery fibrous layer.

Unlike those of some other Geastrum species, the rays of G. quadrifidum are not hygroscopic: they do not open and close in response to changes in humidity. Generally, the rays are broad, but they may seem narrow as their edges are often rolled inwards. The width of the exoperidium (when still attached to the mycelial cup) is 8–25 mm (3/8–1 in), when fully expanded about 15–90 mm (5/8–3 1/2 in). The pseudoparenchymatous layer when fresh is about 1–2 mm thick, initially whitish, later turning beige to brownish (sometimes over reddish tints), and dark brown when old. In newly expanded specimens this layer is covered with a thin layer of crystals and hyphae, sometimes forming a pseudoparenchymatous cup or collar that often peels off in patches, when dry shrunken and hard. The fibrous layer is papery to leathery. The inner side, when free from pseudoparenchymatous remnants, is almost white, in age becoming dirty grayish-white and sometimes greenish due to algae; the outer side is initially whitish, somewhat glossy, but in age becomes grayish-white and dull. The mycelial layer has a whitish inner side and is strongly attached to the litter on its outer side. It persists for a long time (1–2-year-old fruit bodies with intact mycelial cups have been found).

The spore sac is variable in shape, ranging from roughly spherical to egg-shaped or irregular, but it is usually taller than it is wide. Its diameter ranges between 3.5 and 16 mm (1/8 and 5/8 in), although it is most commonly between 5 and 10 mm (3/16 and 3/8 in). An apophysis (a swelling on the underside of the spore sac) is often present. The stalk is visible when the pseudoparenchymatous layer has dried up, and is short but distinct, measuring 1–2.5 mm tall. The color is variable; in dry specimens it is whitish, light beige, beige gray, smoky gray or brownish-gray. The endoperidium in newly expanded fruit bodies is pruinose: covered with a light beige to whitish powder of hyphae and crystalline matter. This powder gradually disappears as the fruit body ages. Its color is highly variable, and both light and dark endoperidia are present. The peristome (a clearly demarcated region encircling the opening of the spore sac) is distinctly delimited, with a disc-like to more or less conical shape. It is lighter in color than the spore sac, and up to 2 mm high. In old specimens, the hyphae around the peristome sometimes stick together to develop radial grooves. The color is variable, but often of grayish or grayish-brown tints, often lighter than the endoperidium. The columella (sterile tissue, usually originating in the base of the gleba, extending into or through the gleba) is rather weak, more or less columnar to club-shaped, emerging from a more or less bulge-like continuation of the stalk and intruding to about the half or more into the mature gleba. The mature gleba is dark brown. G. quadrifidum is inedible.

=== Microscopic characteristics ===
The basidia of G. quadrifidum have a basal clamp connection, or they narrow into a hyphal part that ends at a clamp. When they are young, they are more or less ellipsoid to club-shaped, but in age they often become more or less bottle-shaped, ampullaceous or sometimes almost lecythiform, among other shapes; when mature they measure 14–21 x 4.5–7 μm (excluding the hyphal part). The hyphal part is less than 1–6 x 1–2 μm. The sterigmata (thin projections of the basidia that attach to the spore) are 4–6 μm long and mostly 1–1.5 μm thick. The hyphae located immediately underneath the basidia are thin-walled, 1–2 μm wide, provided with clamps and densely branched. The hyphae of the tramal plates are roughly parallel, thin-walled, 1–2 μm wide, and provided with clamps which may be dilated.

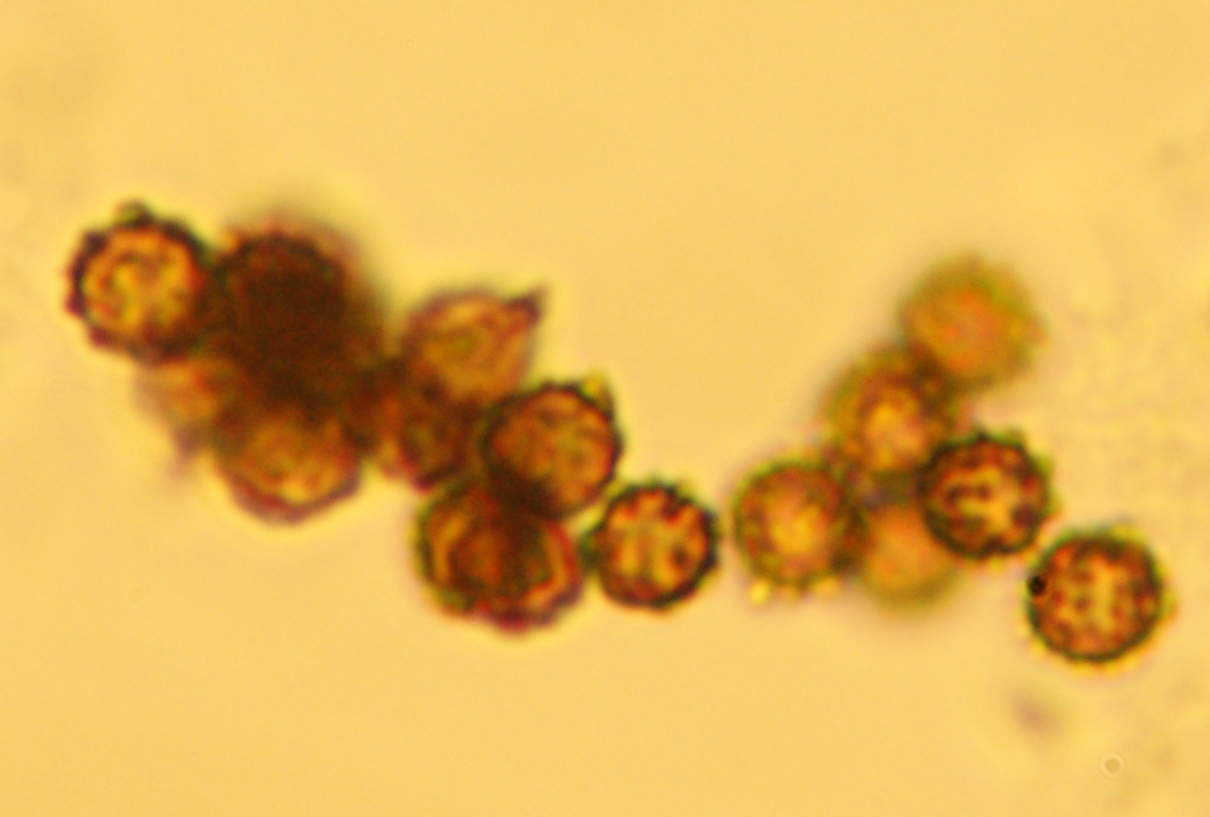
Spores are roughly spherical and have ornamentations on the surface.

The spores in mass are dark brown when mature. They are spherical, covered with "warts" or verrucae, and measure 5–6 μm in diameter (including ornamentation). (Note: Bates reports a slightly larger range—5.6 to 6.4 μm—with an average of 6.1 μm.) The spores often contain a drop of oil. Scanning electron microscopy reveals the verrucae to be up to 0.8 μm long, conical to columnar processes with rounded to almost flattened tips. The apiculus (the part of a spore which attaches to the sterigmata at the end of a basidium) is distinct with radiating ridge-like processes. The young spore is first broadly egg-shaped before becoming roughly spherical in maturity.

The capillitium refers to coarse, late-maturing, thick-walled cells in the gleba that develop pores or slits in their thick secondary walls. The capillitial hyphae are 1.5–9.5 μm wide, thick-walled, often with a narrow lumen, and with or without surface ornamentation. The columella hyphae are 1.5–14 μm wide (occasionally wider, up to 34 μm), thick-walled, often with narrow lumen. Single thin-walled, about 1.5 μm wide hyphae with clamps can be observed. The endoperidial hyphae are densely interwoven, thick-walled, and about 2–6 μm wide. The whitish powder on newly expanded specimens consists of crystalline matter and thin-walled, 1.5–4 μm wide, branched hyphae with clamps. The peristome hyphae are thick-walled, 2–11 μm wide. The pseudoparenchymatous layer is built up by bladder-like, thin-walled hyphae of varying size. On the surface of newly expanded specimens crystals and thin-walled hyphae of the same kind as on the endoperidium are present. The crystals are calcium oxalate dihydrate that have the crystalline structure of a pyramid, and are arranged singly or in loose aggregates, 11 to 30 μm in size. The fibrous layer has thick-walled hyphae 1.5–4 μm wide. The mycelial layer in the inner, very thin part (seen as a glossy lining on the fibrous layer of newly expanded fruit bodies) consists of a dense web of thin-walled, 1.5–4 μm wide, clamped hyphae. Thick-walled hyphae are also present, measuring 2–11 (sometimes up to 19) μm wide. The outer part (the mycelial cup) consists of thick-walled, branched and densely interwoven hyphae (often with a narrow lumen) that measure 1.5–4 μm wide.

=== Similar species ===
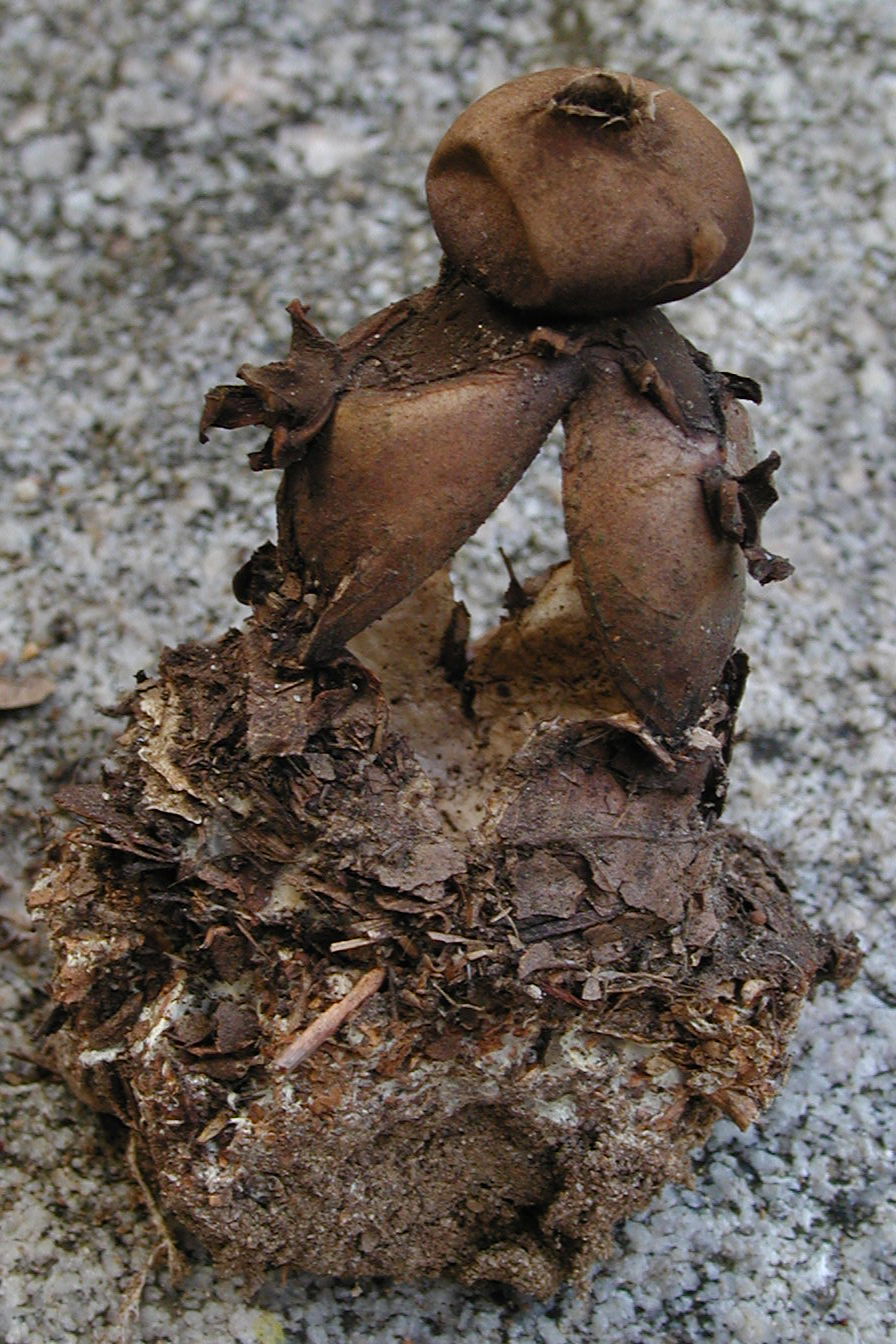
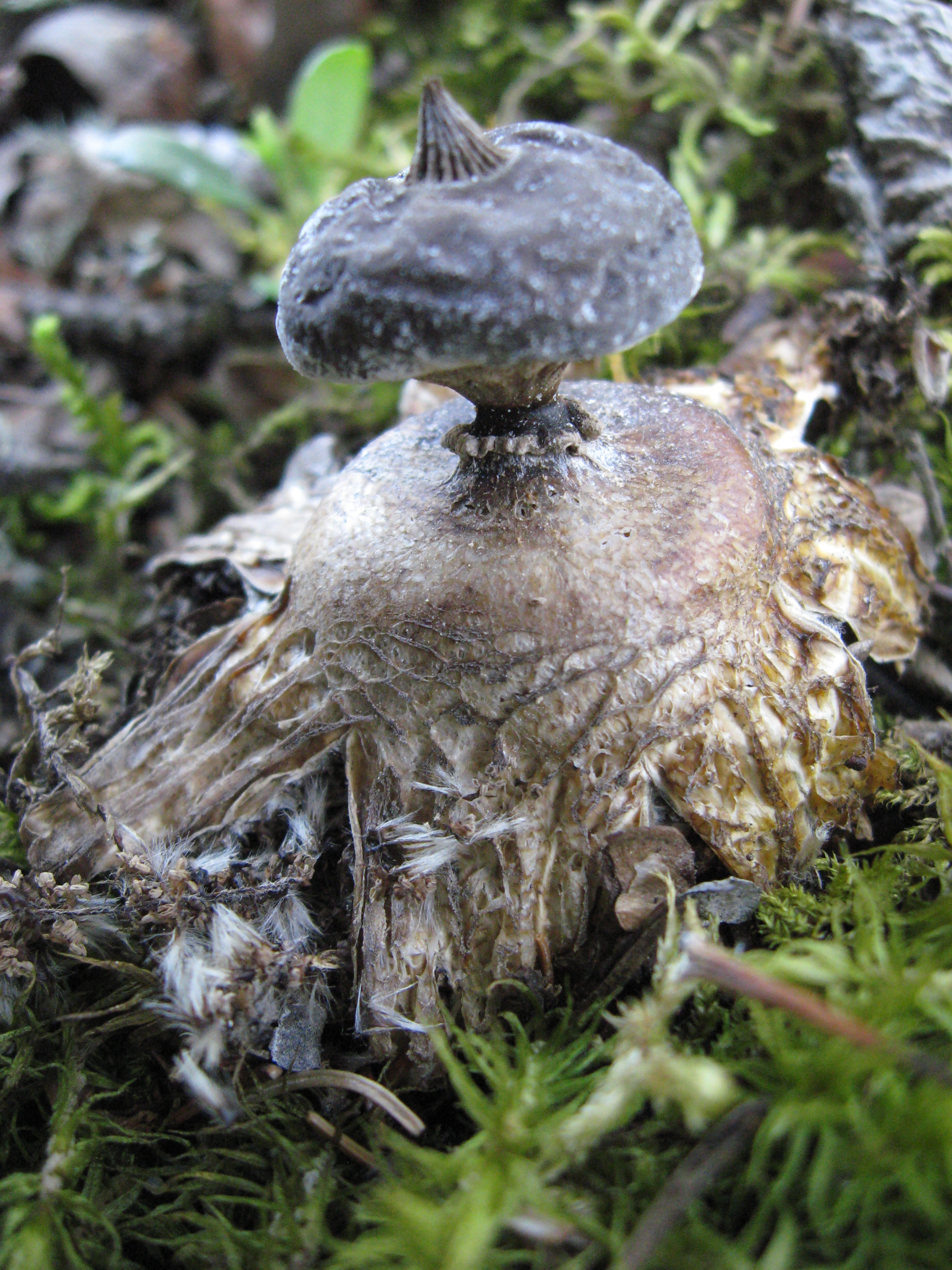
G. fornicatum (left) and G. pectinatum (right) are also fornicate earthstars.

Geastrum quadrifidum is readily confused with G. fornicatum, which is larger—up to 15 cm (6 in)—and has smaller spores (4–5 μm in diameter). Geastrum minimum, although small like G. quadrifidum, is distinguished by having more rays (usually more than seven), and it is not fornicate. Also, its mycelial layer is attached to the fibrous layer for a long time, without forming a mycelial cup like G. quadrifidum. The Chilean species G. jurei does not have a clearly demarcated peristome.

Geastrum quadrifidum is also similar to G. dissimile, G. leptospermum, and G. welwitschii in its fruit body morphology, especially the exoperidial rays, endoperidial body, and peristome. Geastrum dissimile differs from G. quadrifidum by its often sulcate or silky fimbriate, smooth peristome, and slightly smaller spores (4–5 μm in diameter). Geastrum leptospermum can be distinguished from G. quadrifidum by its smaller spores (2–3 μm in diameter), and by its preference for growing in mosses on tree trunks. G. welwitschii differs from G. quadrifidum by its epigeal mycelial cup with a felted or tufted outer surface, and indistinctly delimited peristome.

== Distribution, habitat and ecology ==
Although Geastrum quadrifidum has a wide distribution, it is not a common species. European countries from which the fungus has been reported include Belgium, Denmark, France, Germany, Montenegro, Norway, Poland, and Sweden. In Asia, it has been collected in China and Japan. The North American distribution extends from Canada south to Mexico, and includes Hawaii. It is also found in Australia and New Zealand, South Africa, and South America. Because of its rarity, it has been placed on the Regional Red Lists of several European countries, including Montenegro, Denmark, Norway, and Poland.

Like most earthstars, G. quadrifidum is a saprobic fungus, and spends most of its life cycle as thin strands of mycelium, deriving nutrients by decomposing leaf litter and similar detritus, converting it to humus and mineralizing organic matter in the soil. The fungal fruit bodies are generally found in coniferous woodland, where they appear in summer and autumn. In Mexico, it was found in tropical thorn forest and pine-oak forest in the summer. In Britain, all collections have been made in beech forest on calcareous soil.
