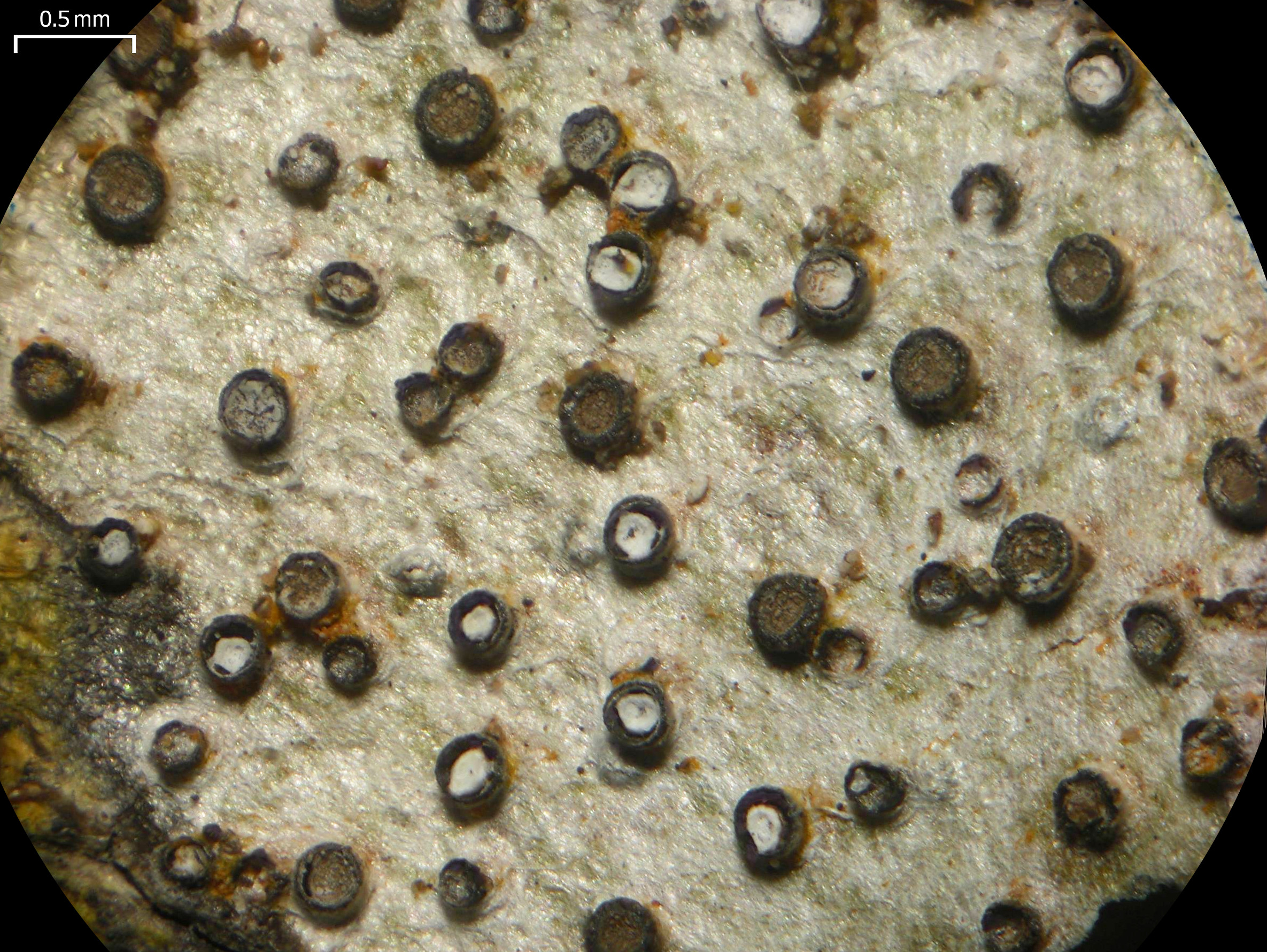

Scientific classification
- Domain: Eukaryota
- Kingdom: Fungi
- Division: Ascomycota
- Class: Lecanoromycetes
- Order: Graphidales
- Family: Graphidaceae
- Genus: Glyphis
- Species: G. scyphulifera

Binomial name
- Glyphis scyphulifera (Ach.) Staiger (2002)

Synonyms
- Lecidea scyphulifera Ach. (1814); Gyrostomum scyphuliferum (Ach.) Nyl. (1862); Thelotrema scyphuliferum (Ach.) Nyl. (1866)

= Glyphis scyphulifera =

Species of lichen

Glyphis scyphulifera is a species of corticolous (bark-dwelling), crustose lichen in the family Graphidaceae. It was first formally described as a new species in 1814 by the Swedish lichenologist Erik Acharius, who classified it in the genus Lecidea. William Nylander proposed to transfer the taxon to the genus Gyrostomum in 1862, and then later (1866) to Thelotrema. Bettina Staiger reclassified it in Glyphis in 2002, as part of a large-scale restructuring of the Graphidaceae.

Some species of lichenicolous (lichen-dwelling) fungi are known to use Glyphis scyphulifera as a host. These include Tremella wedinii and Lawreya glyphidiphila.
