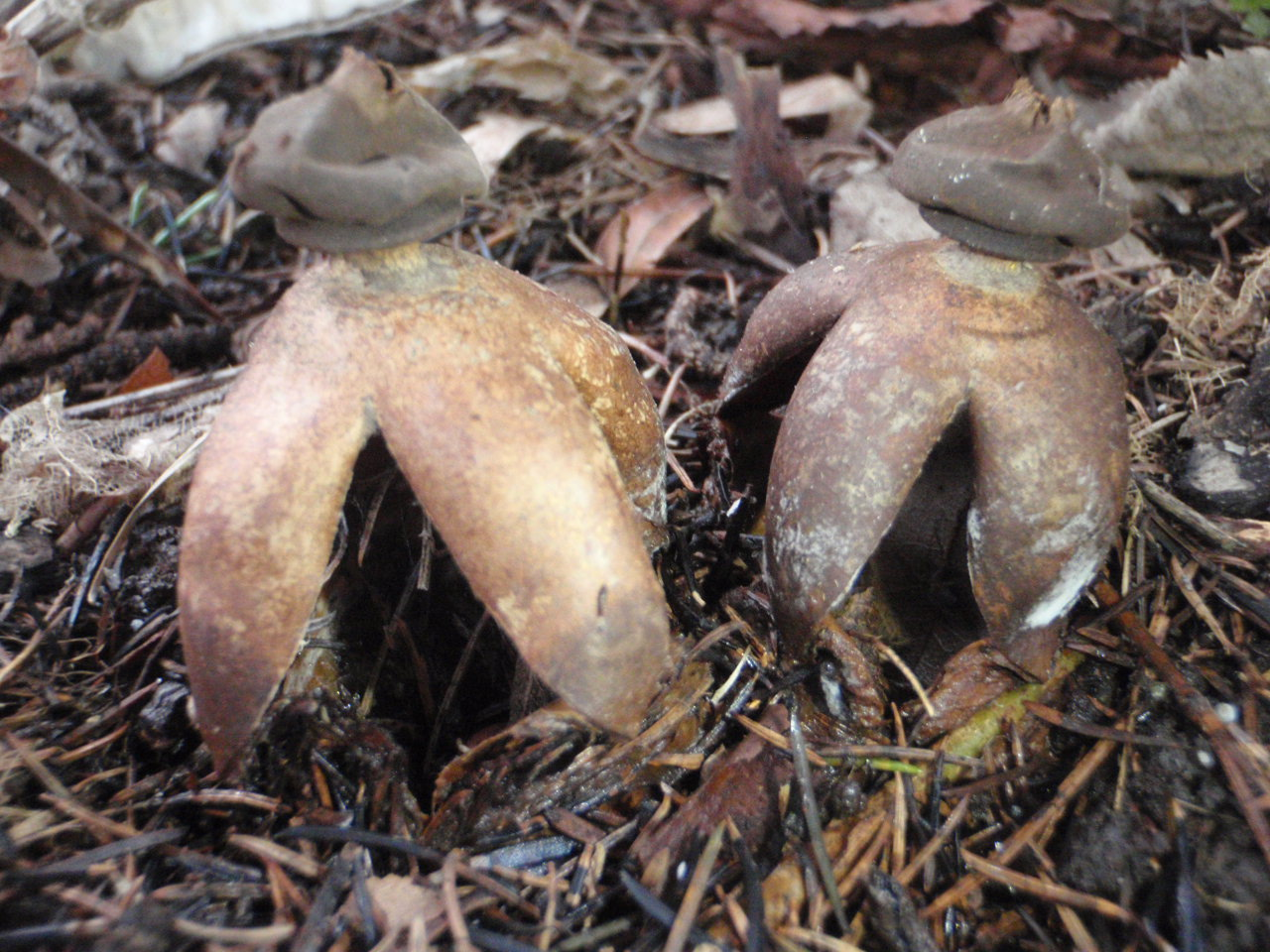

Scientific classification
- Kingdom: Fungi
- Division: Basidiomycota
- Class: Agaricomycetes
- Order: Geastrales
- Family: Geastraceae
- Genus: Geastrum
- Species: G. fornicatum

Binomial name
- Geastrum fornicatum (Huds.) Hook. (1821)

Synonyms
- Geastrum multifidum Pers. (1794); Lycoperdon fornicatum Huds. (1821); Geastrum fornicatum var. multifidum (Pers.) Fr. (1829); Plecostoma fornicatum (Huds.) Corda (1842)

= Geastrum fornicatum =

Geastrum fornicatum
- Mycological characteristics
- Glebal hymenium
- No distinct cap
- Hymenium attachment is not applicable
- Lacks a stipe
- Spore print is brown
- Ecology is saprotrophic
- Edibility is inedible

Geastrum fornicatum, commonly known as the acrobatic earthstar or the arched earthstar, is an inedible species of mushroom in the family Geastraceae. Like other earthstar mushrooms, the thick outer skin splits open at maturity, exposing the spore sac to the elements. It is found in the southwest United States.

== Taxonomy ==
When first described in the late 17th century, the species was called Fungus anthropomorphus due to its resemblance to the human figure. In 1799, English naturalist James Sowerby wrote:

So strange a vegetable has surprised many; and in the year 1695 it was published under the name of Fungus Anthropomorphus, and figured with human faces on the head. It is at first roundish; in ripening the head bursts through the two coats or wrappers; the inner wrapper, detaching itself from the outer, becomes inverted, connected only by the edges; the coats most constantly split into four parts.

The specific epithet fornicatum (Latin for 'arched' or 'vaulted') refers to the arched shape of the rays which extend downwards to rest on the mycelial sac and elevate the spore sac.

== Description ==
The immature fruit body is roughly spherical in shape, typically 1–4 centimetres (1/2–1 1/2 inches) in diameter, and dark brown in color. At maturity, the exoperidium (outer layer) splits into four to five rays which curve backwards so as to elevate the fruit body and raise the spore sac for optimal spore dispersal; the tips of the rays remain attached to a basal cup. The spore sac contains an ostiole, a small opening near the apex.

The mature fruiting body may be up to 6 cm (2 1/4 in) in diameter and 8 cm (3 1/4 in) tall. The exoperidium is attached to the soil by rhizomorphs. The spores are spherical, warted, thick-walled, nonamyloid and 5–6 μm; when young, they are white and firm, but produce a dark-brown color spore print in maturity.

=== Similar species ===
Similar species include Geastrum minimum and Geastrum quadrifidum.

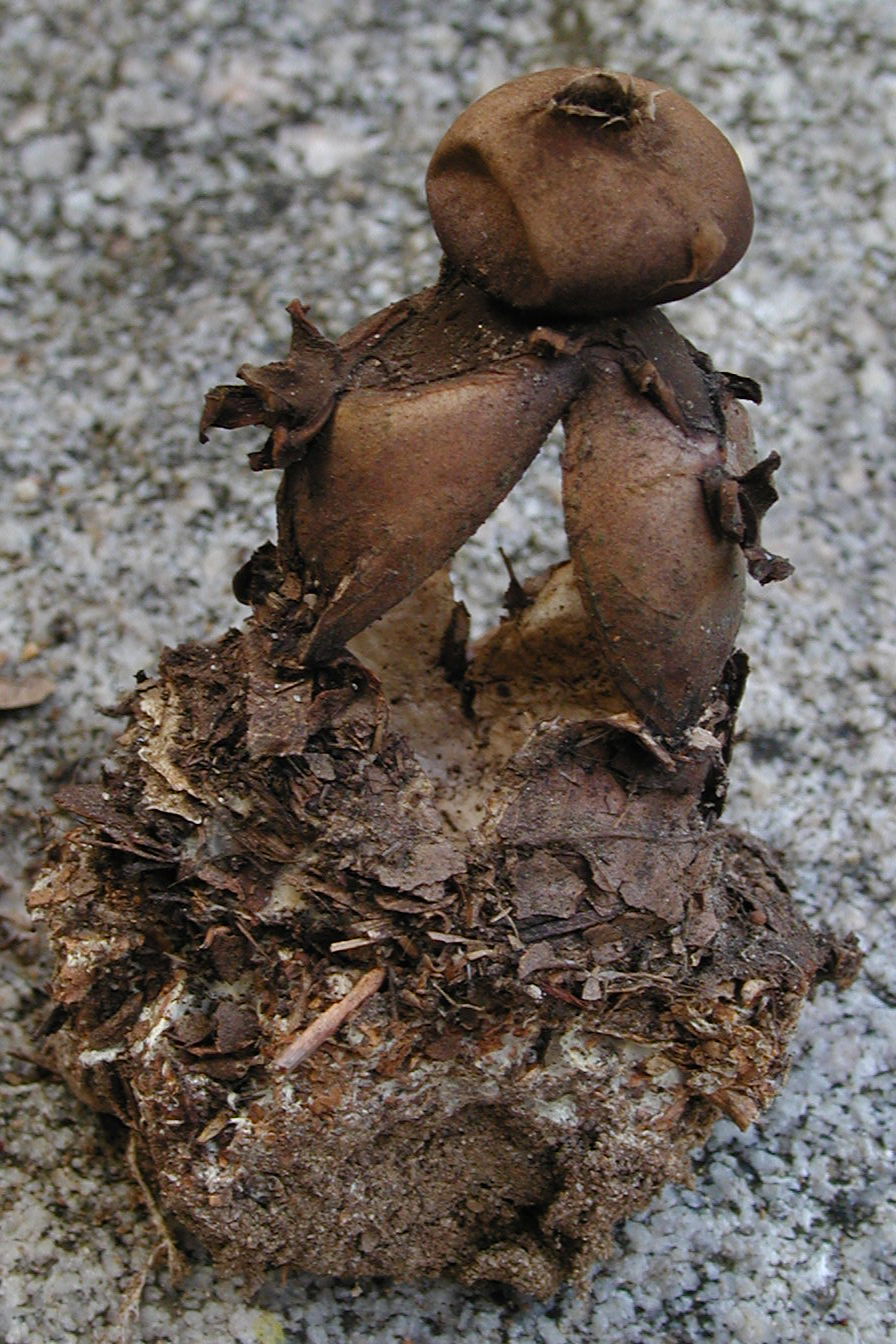
Growing under an oak in California

== Distribution and habitat ==
The uncommon fungus can be found singly or in small groups in the southwest United States between October and March. It usually grows under bushes and trees in deciduous woods, but not in too deeply wooded areas.

== Uses ==
Methanol extracts of G. fornicatum have been shown to have antimicrobial properties, inhibiting the growth of various bacteria that are pathogenic to humans, including Bacillus subtilis, Escherichia coli, Klebsiella pneumoniae, Pseudomonas aeruginosa, Salmonella typhimurium, and Streptococcus pyogenes, as well as the fungi Candida albicans, Rhodotorula rubra, and Kluyveromyces fragilis.

It is inedible.
